= List of companies of Saudi Arabia =

Location of Saudi Arabia

Saudi Arabia is a sovereign Arab state in Western Asia constituting the bulk of the Arabian Peninsula.

Public companies are listed on the Tadawul. For further information on the types of business entities in this country and their abbreviations, see "Business entities in Saudi Arabia".

== Largest firms ==
This list shows firms in the Fortune Global 500, which ranks firms by total revenues reported before 25 January 2025. Only the top five firms (if available) are included as a sample.

Rank	Image	Name	2024 Revenues (US$M)	Employees	Notes
4		Aramco	$494,890	73,311	The Aramco is a diversified oil and gas exploration & production state-owned company, headquartered in Riyadh.

== Notable firms ==
This list includes notable companies with primary headquarters located in the country. The industry and sector follow the Industry Classification Benchmark taxonomy. Organizations which have ceased operations are included and noted as defunct.

Notable companies Status: P=Private, S=State; A=Active, D=Defunct
Name	Industry	Sector	Headquarters	Founded	Notes	Status	
A. A. Turki Group	Conglomerates	-	Dammam	1950	Has 23 various divisions, joint ventures and standalone companies	P	A
Abdallah Al Faris Company for Heavy Industries	Industrials	Defense	Riyadh		Heavy military vehicles manufacturer	P	A
Abdullah Al-Othaim Markets	Consumer services	Food retailers & wholesalers	Riyadh	1980	Grocery	P	A
ACWA Power	Utilities	Electricity	Riyadh	2004	Electric generation and distribution	P	A
Advanced Electronics Company Limited	Industrials	Electronic components & equipment	Riyadh	1988	Electronics research and manufacturing, defense, security, digital services	S	A
Ahmad Hamad Al Gosaibi & Brothers	Conglomerates	-	Khobar	1940	Real estate, food & beverage, hospitality	P	A
Al Baik	Consumer services	Restaurants & bars	Jeddah	1974	Fast food restaurants	P	A
Al Bilad Bank	Financials	Banks	Riyadh	2004	Islamic bank	P	A
Al Faisaliah Group	Conglomerates	-	Riyadh	1970	Food & beverage, consumer goods, media, chemicals	P	A
Al Madina	Consumer services	Publishing	Jeddah	1937	Newspaper	P	A
Al Riyadh	Consumer services	Publishing	Riyadh	1965	Newspaper	P	A
Al Shoula Group	Conglomerates	-	Riyadh	1970	Insurance, real estate, defense	P	A
Al Tazaj	Consumer services	Restaurants & bars	Jeddah	1989	Fast-casual restaurants	P	A
Al Yaum	Consumer services	Publishing	Dammam	1965	Newspaper	P	A
Al-Bilad	Consumer services	Publishing	Jeddah	1932	Newspaper	P	A
Al-Muhaidib	Conglomerates	-	Dammam	1946	Food, retail, industrials, financials, energy	P	A
Al-Rajhi Bank	Financials	Banks	Riyadh	1957	Islamic bank	P	A
Alawwal Bank	Financials	Banks	Riyadh	1926	Bank, formerly Saudi Hollandi Bank	P	A
Aldrees Petroleum and Transport Services Company	Oil and gas	Exploration & production	Riyadh	1962	Petroleum marketing	P	A
Alinma Bank	Financials	Banks	Riyadh	2006	Bank	P	A
Almarai	Consumer goods	Food products	Riyadh	1977	Dairy products	P	A
Arab National Bank	Financials	Banks	Riyadh	1979	Bank	P	A
Arabian Machinery and Heavy Equipment Company	Industrials	Commercial vehicle-Equipment leasing	Khobar	2006	Construction & industrial vehicle rentals	P	A
Arabian Shield Cooperative Insurance Company	Financials	Full line insurance	Riyadh	2007	Insurance	P	A
Aramco	Oil and gas	Exploration & production	Dhahran	1933	State oil & gas	S	A
Arasco	Consumer goods	Food products	Riyadh	1983	Agriculture and food-processing	P	A
Bahri	Transportation	Marine transportation	Riyadh	1978	Shipping line	P	A
Banque Saudi Fransi	Financials	Banks	Riyadh	1977	Islamic bank	P	A
Bayanat	Telecommunications	Telecommunications service providers	Riyadh	2005	Telecommunications, ISP	P	A
BinDawood Holding	Consumer services	Retail	Jeddah	1984	Hypermarkets	P	A
Bin Quraya	Industrials	Commercial vehicle-Equipment leasing	Dhahran	1975	Construction & industrial vehicle rentals	P	A
Civil and Electrical Projects Contracting Company	Industrials	Heavy construction	Jeddah	1977	Construction	P	A
Dallah Al-Baraka	Conglomerates	-	Jeddah	1969	Financials, health care, industrials, logistics	P	A
Dar Al-Arkan Real Estate Development Company	Financials	Real estate holding & development	Riyadh	1994	Development	P	A
Dussur	Financials	Investment services	Riyadh	2014	Investment/Industrial development	S	A
E. A. Juffali and Brothers	Conglomerates	-	Jeddah	1946	Power, telecommunications, industrials	P	A
Elm	Industrials	Business support services	Riyadh	1988	Business solutions	P	A
Etihad Atheeb Telecom	Telecommunications	Telecommunications service providers	Riyadh	2008	Telecommunications, ISP	P	A
Flynas	Consumer services	Airlines	Riyadh	2007	Low-cost airline, formerly named Nas Air	P	A
Gandour	Consumer goods	Food products	Riyadh	1857	Food-processing	P	A
Haji Husein Alireza & Co. Ltd.	Conglomerates	-	Jeddah	1906	Food & beverage, construction, consumer goods	P	A
House of Alireza	Conglomerates	-	Khobar	1845	Construction, real estate, shipping	P	A
Integrated Telecom Company	Telecommunications	Telecommunications service providers	Riyadh	2005	Telecommunications, ISP, part of Mawarid Holding	P	A
Islamic Development Bank	Financials	Banks	Jeddah	1975	Financing	P	A
Jadwa Investment	Financials	Investment services	Riyadh	2006	Investment services	P	A
Jarir Bookstore	Consumer services	Specialty retailers	Riyadh	1979	Books	P	A
King Fahd Complex for the Printing of the Holy Quran	Consumer services	Publishing	Medina	1985	Publishing	P	A
Kingdom Holding Company	Conglomerates	-	Riyadh	1980	Financials, tourism, media, oil & gas, technology	P	A
Kudu	Consumer services	Restaurants & bars	Riyadh	1988	Fast food restaurants	P	A
Lucidya	Technology	Consumer digital services	Riyadh	2016	AI based customer experience services	P	A
Maaden	Basic materials	General mining	Riyadh	1997	State-owned mining	S	A
MBC Group	Consumer services	Broadcasting & entertainment	Riyadh	1991	Satellite media conglomerate	P	A
Mawarid Holding	Conglomerates	-	Riyadh	1968	Financials, telecommunications, media, industrials	P	A
Military Industries Corporation	Industrials	Defense	Riyadh	1953	Heavy military vehicles manufacturer, subsidiary of SAMI	S	A
Mobily	Telecommunications	Telecommunications service providers	Riyadh	2004	Telecommunications, ISP	P	A
Nadec	Consumer goods	Food products	Riyadh	1981	Agriculture and food-processing	P	A
Nama Chemicals	Basic materials	Specialty chemicals	Jubail	1992	Chemical products	P	A
Naseej	Technology	Consumer Digital Services	Riyadh	1989	Internet, IT services	P	A
National Commercial Bank	Financials	Banks	Jeddah	1953	Bank	P	A
Okaz	Consumer services	Publishing	Jeddah	1960	Newspaper	P	A
The Olayan Group	Conglomerates	-	Riyadh	1947	Construction, food & beverage, industrials	P	A
Omrania and Associates	Industrials	Business support services	Riyadh	1973	Architecture	P	A
Panda Retail Company	Consumer services	Food retailers & wholesalers	Riyadh	1978	Grocery, part of Savola Group	P	A
Petro Rabigh	Oil and gas	Exploration & production	Rabigh	2005	Refining and marketing	P	A
Petromin Corporation	Basic materials	Specialty chemicals	Jeddah	1968	Petrochemical products	P	A
Qaym	Consumer services	Broadcasting & entertainment	Riyadh	2006	Reviews	P	A
Rezayat	Conglomerates	-	Khobar	1949	Industrials, financials, technology, oil & gas	P	A
Riyad Bank	Financials	Banks	Riyadh	1957	Bank	P	A
SABIC	Basic materials	Specialty chemicals	Riyadh	1976	Chemicals and metals	P	A
SACO Hardware	Consumer services	Specialty retailers	Riyadh	1985	Home improvement products retailing and wholesaling	P	A
Samba Financial Group	Financials	Banks	Riyadh	1980	Bank	P	A
SAMI	Industrials	Aerospace & defense	Riyadh	1953	Aerospace, advanced defense systems	S	A
Sahara Net	Technology	Consumer Digital Services	Dammam	1989	Internet, cloud computing services	P	A
Saudi Advanced Industries Company	Financials	Investment services	Riyadh	1987	Technologies investment services	P	A
Saudi Arabia Railways		Railroad	Riyadh	2006		P	A
Saudi Binladin Group	Industrials	Heavy construction	Jeddah	1931	Construction conglomerate	P	A
Saudi Electricity Company	Utilities	Electricity	Riyadh	2000	Electric generation and distribution	S	A
Saudi National Bank	Financials	Banks	Riyadh	1953	Commercial bank	P	A
Saudi Oger	Industrials	Heavy construction	Riyadh	1978	Construction, defunct 2017	P	D
Saudi Railways Organization		Railroad		1966		P	D
Saudi Readymix Concrete Company	Industrials	Building materials & fixtures	Khobar	1978	Concrete	P	A
Saudi Telecom Company	Telecommunications	Telecommunications service providers	Riyadh	1998	Telecommunications, ISP	P	A
Saudi Water Authority	Utilities	Water	Riyadh	1974	Water management	S	A
Saudia	Consumer services	Airlines	Jeddah	1945	Also known as Saudi Arabian Airlines	P	A
Saudia Dairy and Foodstuff Co.	Consumer goods	Food products	Jeddah	1976	Dairy products	P	A
Savola Group	Consumer goods	Food products	Jeddah	1979	Food manufacturing, grocery and restaurants	P	A
Savvy Games Group	Technology	Software	Riyadh	2021	Video games developer group	P	A
Sawani	Consumer goods	Food products	Riyadh	2023	Dairy products	P	A
Sela	Consumer services	Recreational services	Jeddah	1997	Entertainment, hospitality	P	A
Shamiekh Holding Group	Conglomerates	-	Riyadh	1980	Consumer Discretionary	P	A
Shawarmer	Consumer services	Restaurants & bars	Riyadh	1999	Fast food restaurants	P	A
stc Group	Telecommunications	Telecommunications service providers	Riyadh	1998	Telecommunications, ISP	P	A
The Saudi British Bank	Financials	Banks	Riyadh	1978	Bank, associated with HSBC (UK)	P	A
Tasali Snack Foods	Consumer goods	Food products				P	A
Xenel	Conglomerates	-	Jeddah	1973	Energy, industrials, financials	P	A
Zain Saudi Arabia	Telecommunications	Telecommunications service providers	Riyadh	2008	Telecommunications, ISP	P	A
Zamil Steel Holding	Basic materials	Iron & steel	Dammam	1977	Steel and construction materials	P	A

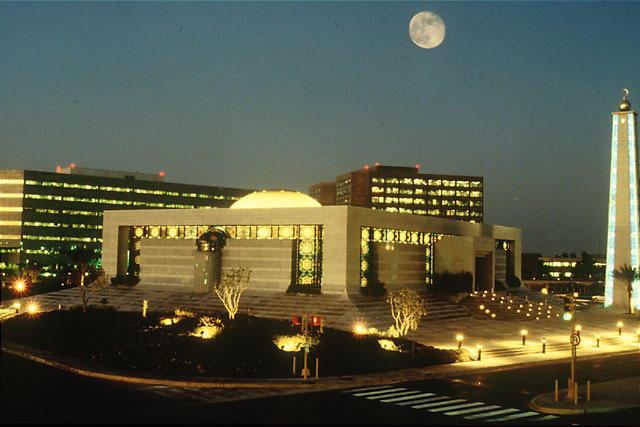
Saudi Aramco in Dhahran

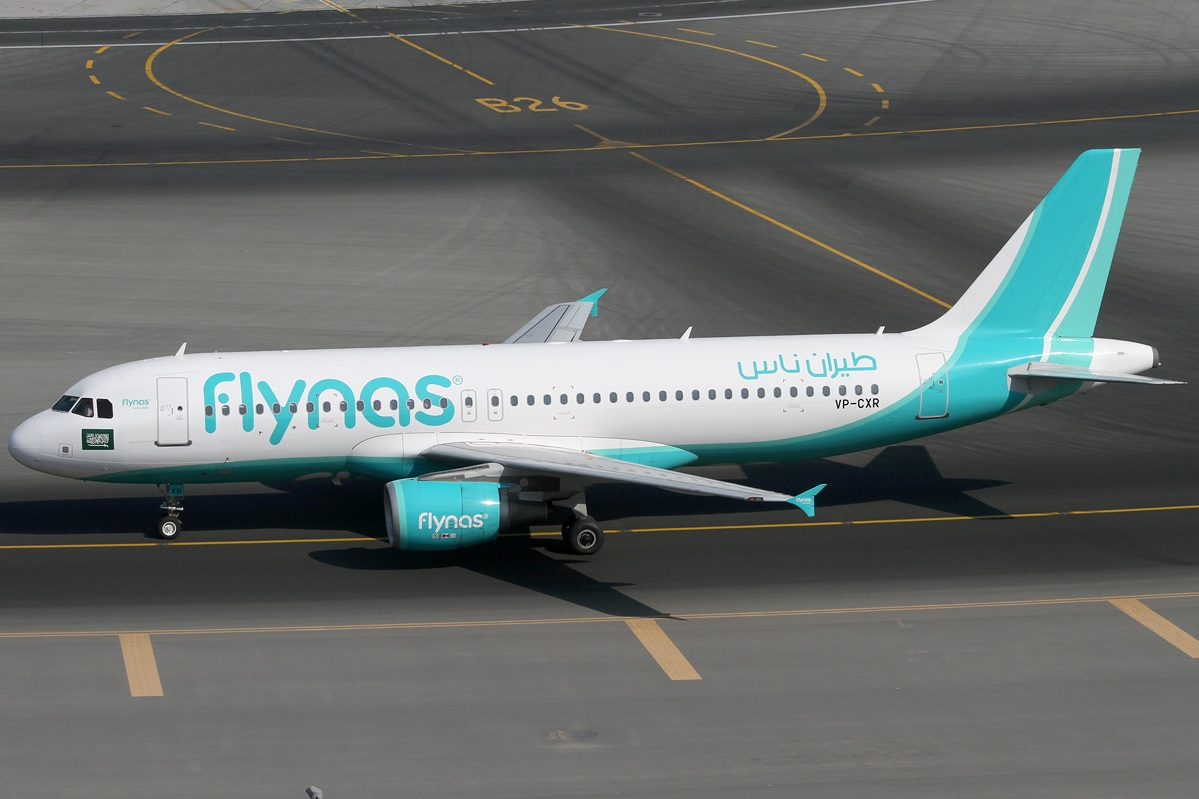
Flynas Airbus A320-214 at Dubai International Airport

== See also ==
- List of banks in Saudi Arabia
- List of newspapers in Saudi Arabia
- Media of Saudi Arabia
- List of largest companies in Saudi Arabia
