= Saudi Arabian Fertilizer Company =

Petrochemical company

SABIC Agri-Nutrients Co.(SABIC AN)
- Native name: سافکو
- ISIN: SA0007879139
- Industry: Chemicals
- Founded: September 11, 1965; 60 years ago
- Headquarters: Jubail, Saudi Arabia
- Key people: Abdulrahman Ahmed Shamsaddin (CEO), Fahad M. Al-Battar (COO)
- Products: urea, ammonia
- Revenue: $1 Billion (2019)
- Total assets: 9,662,542,000 Saudi riyal (2019)
- Website: safco.com.sa

Safco is the first petrochemical company in Saudi Arabia. It was established in 1965. SAFCO is one of the largest producers of chemicals in the world with an annual production capacity of over 4.9 million tons of fertilizers. SABIC owns 42.99% with 57.01% being held by the private sector and the public.

== Operations ==
SAFCO is one of the largest producers of urea in the world with an annual production capacity of over 2.6 million tons of urea while its ammonia annual production capacity is 2.3 million tons. Also SAFCO owns 3.87% share in the capital of Arabian Industrial Fibers Company (IBN RUSHD) and 1.69% in the capital of Yanbu National Petrochemical Company (YANSAB).

== See also ==
- List of companies of Saudi Arabia
- List of largest companies in Saudi Arabia
