= Mohamed Al-Mady =

- Mohammed Bin Hamad Al-Mady
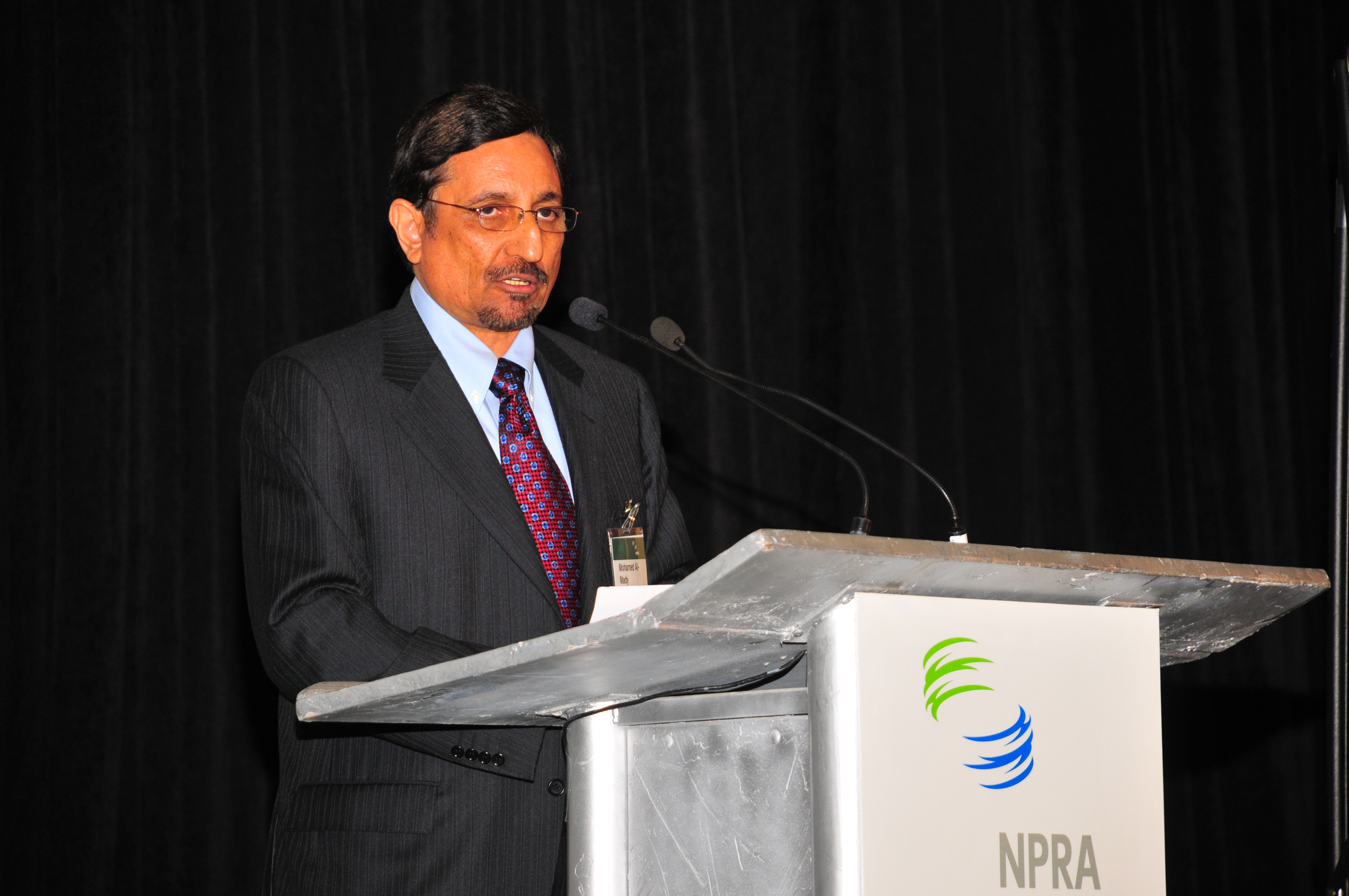
- Mohamed Al-Mady (2009)
- Citizenship: Saudi Arabia
- Known for: CEO of SABIC
- Awards: Petrochemical Heritage Award
- Scientific career
- Fields: Petrochemical Industry
- Institutions: Saudi Basic Industries Corporation (SABIC)

Mohamed Al-Mady (Arabic: محمد الماضي) was the Vice Chairman and Chief Executive Officer of Saudi Basic Industries Corporation (SABIC).

== Biography ==
He is a chemical engineer, who joined SABIC at its inception in 1976. He earned his BSc at the University of Colorado at Boulder in 1973, and his MSc in chemical engineering from the University of Wyoming in 1975.

Before his appointment as Vice Chairman and CEO in 1998, he served as SABIC's General Director of Projects.

Al-Mady stepped down from the CEO position in February 2015, the same month he became the head of the Military Industries Corporation.

Al-Mady is also the Chairman of the Saudi Arabian Fertilizer Company (SAFCO), as well as being a member of the SABIC Research and Technology Executive Committee and SABIC Europe BV's Executive Board. He sits on the board of Aluminium Bahrain (ALBA) and on the US-Saudi Business Council, and heads the Saudi side of the Saudi-Taiwanese Joint Committee for Economic and Technical Cooperation.

In July 2007, Al-Mady was recognized as an Honorary Fellow of the London Business School. The award was made at the School's annual Summer Congregation ceremony for graduates and award recipients in London, UK. In 2009, he was awarded the international Petrochemical Heritage Award.

He is #34 on the Arabian Business list, as of 2009, having previously been #12.
