= Huda Al-Ghoson =

Saudi businesswoman (born 1957)

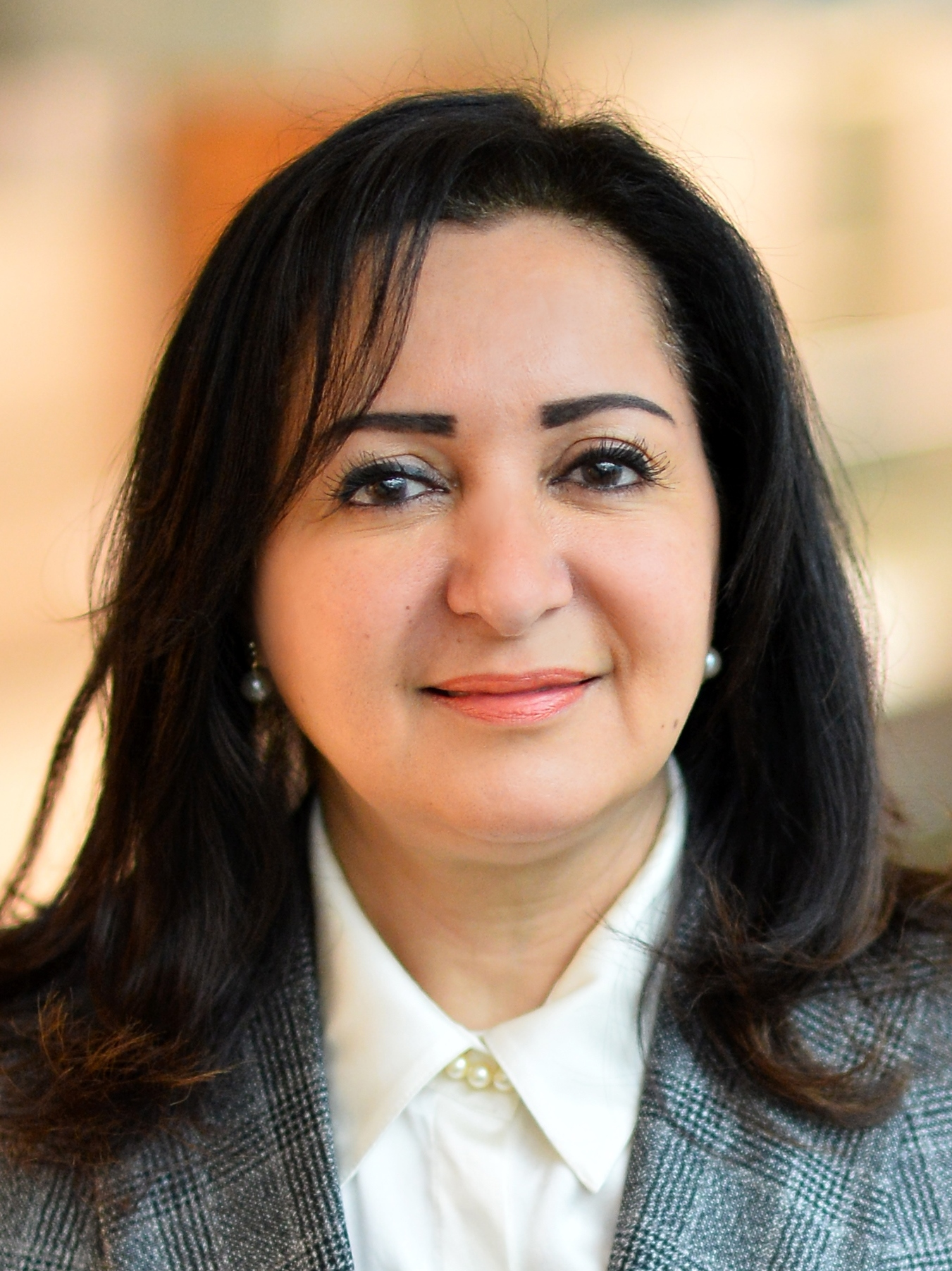
- Born: November 19, 1957
- Education: King Saud University; American University
- Occupation: Human resource executive
- Years active: 1981–2017
- Employer: Saudi Aramco

Huda Mohammed Al-Ghoson (born November 19, 1957) is a former Saudi corporate executive. Al-Ghoson was the Executive Director of Human Resources for Saudi Aramco, the national oil and gas company of Saudi Arabia. She has been named among the world's most powerful Arab businesswomen by Forbes Middle East and one of the world's most influential Arab women by Arabian Business. Her first book, Unbounded, was published in 2022.

== Education ==
Al-Ghoson earned her bachelor's degree in English literature from King Saud University, Riyadh in 1980. She received a Master of Business Administration from American University in Washington, D.C. in 1986.

== Career ==
Al-Ghoson joined Saudi Aramco in 1981. In 2006, she was promoted to director of Saudi Aramco's human resources policy and planning department, and in 2009, she was promoted to general manager of the Training and Development organization, becoming the first woman to handle such a position in the company's then-76-year history. She contributed to the advancement of women at Saudi Aramco by creating two initiatives: 'Women in Business', for women early in their careers, and 'Women in Leadership', for more senior female employees.

In 2012 she became the first woman to assume an executive position at Saudi Aramco when she was promoted to the position of Executive Director of Human Resources. She remained the head of HR in the company until her retirement on December 28, 2017.

In addition to her positions at Saudi Aramco, Al-Ghoson has served as a member of several boards including those of Vela International Marine Limited, the Yanbu Aramco Sinopec Refinery Company (YASREF), Johns Hopkins Aramco Healthcare, Bupa Arabia, and Credit Suisse Saudi Arabia. She has also been a member of the leadership advisor board of Saudi Electricity Company and the Arabian Society of Human Resources.

Currently, Al-Ghoson is a member of the Board of Directors of the Saudi National Bank (SNB) and The Chopra Foundation, and a member of the Nomination & Remuneration Committee of the Saudi Telecom Company (STC) and The Hevolution Foundation.

== Recognition ==
Al-Ghoson was ranked by Forbes Middle East fourth in its list of most powerful Arab women in the field of executive management. She also received the 2014 Arab Woman Award from the Arabian Business magazine naming her one of the most influential figures in the energy domain.

She received recognition and achievement awards for her educational outreach efforts and women's development programs from numerous bodies, including the Bilateral U.S.-Arab Chamber of Commerce (2016), the Middle East Excellence Awards Institute (2016), Arabian Business Achievements Awards (2015), and the Arab Women Award, KSA (2014).
