= Bin Quraya =

Heavy fleet company in Saudi Arabia

Coordinates: 26°19′29.56″N 50°04′22.86″E

Bin Quraya Holding Co.
- Company type: Privately held company, Limited
- Industry: Various
- Founded: 1975 (As ASCO)
- Headquarters: Dhahran
- Key people: President: Awad Bin Quraya; Chief Executive Officer: Hamad Bin Quraya; General Manager: C. Catropa
- Services: Equipment Rental, Construction & Trade
- Number of employees: 7000
- Website: www.BinQuraya.com

Bin Quraya Group is the leading Mobile Cranes and Heavy Equipment rental firm in Saudi Arabia, with one of the Middle East's largest heavy equipment fleets. The company is based in Dhahran, Saudi Arabia, with clients and projects across the country.

== History ==
In 1975 Mr. Awad Bin Quraya and Mr. Sadiq, a Bahrain national, formed a joint venture company known as "ASCO" with a paid up capital of SR. 100,000.00 to pursue small projects on sub-contract basis from the main contractors for Saudi Aramco projects. The hard work and dedication of "ASCO" was soon recognized by Saudi Aramco and it was included in the list of Short Form Contracts for Civil & Mechanical work. At that time the company employed 20-25 workers including the owners and the only equipment the company owned at the time was an old Crane, three Pick-ups trucks and a couple of compressors.

In 1982, Mr. Sadiq decided to quit the partnership and subsequently Bin Quraya Est. Technical Services & General Contracting, a sole proprietorship of Mr. Awad Bin Quraya was established.

In a short period of time the establishment was registered with Saudi Aramco as a Mechanical Contractor. The earliest projects were pipeline contracts and required a number of heavy equipment that had to be rented. Therefore, Mr. Awad decided to purchase various types of equipment needed for the projects, simultaneously hiring qualified personnel and using the profits earned from projects for equipment purchase. This resulted in obtaining bigger projects from Saudi Aramco.

The real upswing in business occurred in 1986 when Saudi Aramco's "East West Pipeline Reconditioning Project" at Abqaiq was tendered, and Bin Quraya Est. succeeded in winning Long Form Contracts in the project. Due to project requirements, Bin Quraya Est. procured a sizable inventory of Heavy Equipment especially construction cranes. Currently the Establishment employs 7000 employees and has a fleet of 800 cranes of various capacities and other construction equipment such as wheel loaders, bulldozers, graders, backhoes, pipe-layers (side boom), tractor heads & trailers, dump trucks and other plant equipment.

== Divisions ==
- BQ Rental: Mobile Cranes and Heavy equipment rental
- BQ Build: Construction
- BQ Power: Electric generators rental

== Heavy equipment fleet ==
Bin Quraya possesses one of the largest heavy equipment fleets in the middle east, with over 800 construction cranes.

Bin Qurayas fleet includes cranes from the following manufacturers:

- Liebherr
- Tadano
- Mercedes-Benz
- Volvo
- Toyota
- The Manitowoc Company (formerly Grove Cranes)
- Caterpillar Inc.

== Major clients ==
- Saudi Aramco
- Weatherford
- Shell
- Halliburton
- SABIC
- Total S.A.
- Schlumberger
- Saudi Electricity Company
- Bin Laden Group
- Petro Rabigh
- SATORP
- SINOPEC
- Marafiq
- Saipem
- Royal Commission for Jubail and Yanbu
- BAKER HUGHES SAUDI ARABIA CO.
- DRILLING PETROLEUM SERVICES
- RABIGH REFINING & PETROCHEMICAL
- SAUDI CEMENT COMPANY
- ZAMIL GROUP HOLDING COMPANY
