= A. A. Turki Group =

Saudi Arabian conglomerate company

A. A. Turki Group (ATCO) مجموعة عبد الرحمن علي التركي
- Type: Private
- Industry: Transport
- Founded: 1957; 69 years ago
- Founder: Abdulrahman Ali Al-Turki
- Headquarters: Dammam, Saudi Arabia
- Area served: Saudi Arabia
- Key people: Ziad Abdulrahman Al-Turki (Chairman); Fahad Abdulrahman Al Turki (Vice Chairman); Nawaf Abdulrahman Al Turki (Managing Director)
- Website: www.atco.com.sa

The A. A. Turki Group of Companies (ATCO) is a Saudi Arabian conglomerate company that operate in diverse industries. The group is made up of several stand alone units.

The group covers areas such as automation and control, commercial trading and services, port management and marine services, civil and electromechanical construction, retail services, waste management, chemical cleaning, industrial services, manufacturing, transportation and logistics management, oil and gas products and services, catering and food services, turnkey dewatering systems, and environmental services.

== History ==
It was founded in the mid-1950s and has been operating in Saudi Arabia's governmental, industrial, and consumer sectors. It was founded by Sheikh Abdul Rahman Al-Turki.

== Structure ==
The group is divided into several smaller companies. These include:

- ATCO Commercial: provides services in the energy sector. Its customers include Saudi Aramco, SABIC and Saudi Electricity Company.
- ATCO Construction Material: distribution operations for building materials for major construction companies, including the Saudi Binladin Group.
- East and West Factory: manufactures LV electrical panels for the engineering, chemical, petroleum and construction industries.
- East and West Express: a logistics company. Provides household removal, freight forwarding, packing and crating, logistics services and insurance. Its customers include Marafiq, Saudi Aramco, Saudi Electricity Company and SABIC.
- ATCO Port Management & Marine Services: provides offshore transportation services such as offshore support vessels, anchor handling tugs, docking tugs, etc.
- ATCO Food: provides catering services and restaurant management. Its customers include Saudi Aramco and the Saudi Arabian National Guard.
- East and West Factory Automation Systems: service provider in panel design, engineering, drafting and cabinet creation. Its customers include GE Oil & Gas, Honeywell, Schneider Electric, Alstom, etc.
