= List of largest companies in Saudi Arabia =

This article lists the largest companies of Saudi Arabia by revenue, net profit, and total assets, based on rankings published by the American business magazines Fortune and Forbes, as well as insights provided by Global Database, a UK-based B2B data provider.

== 2024 Global Database list ==
This list displays the Top 7 public companies in Saudi Arabia by assets in 2024. The companies are ranked according to their total assets, presented in millions of US dollars for the fiscal year 2024. Also listed are the headquarters location, net profit, number of employees worldwide, and industry sector of each company.

No.	Name	Industry	Revenue (USD millions)	Net Income (USD millions)	Headquarters	Total Assets (USD millions)
1	Saudi Aramco	Oil and gas	480,446	106,246	Dhahran	646,301
2	Saudi Electricity Company	Electric power	20,080 (SAR 75.33 billion)	2,732 (SAR 10.25 billion)	Riyadh	133,150 (SAR 500.8 billion)
3	SABIC	Chemicals	52,920	4,410	Riyadh	83,490
4	stc	Telecommunications	20,230 (SAR 75.893 million)	6,590 (SAR 24.689 million)	Riyadh	42,860 (SAR 160.638 million)
5	Saudi Arabian Mining Company	Mining			Riyadh	29,800
6	Petro Rabigh	Petrochemicals	10,200	N/A	Rabigh	16,140

== 2019 Fortune list ==
This list displays both of the two Saudi companies in the Fortune Global 500, which ranks the world's largest companies by annual revenue. The figures below are given in millions of US dollars and are for the fiscal year 2018. Also listed are the headquarters location, net profit, number of employees worldwide and industry sector of each company.

Fortune 500 ranking	Name	Industry	Revenue (USD millions)	Profits (USD millions)	Employees	Headquarters
8	Saudi Aramco	Oil and gas	355,905	110,974	76,418	Dhahran
252	Saudi Basic Industries	Chemicals	45,096	5,738	33,000	Riyadh

== 2020 Forbes list ==
This list is based on the Forbes Global 2000, which ranks the world's 2,000 largest publicly traded companies. The Forbes list takes into account a multitude of factors, including the revenue, net profit, total assets and market value of each company; each factor is given a weighted rank in terms of importance when considering the overall ranking. The table below also lists the headquarters location and industry sector of each company. The figures are in billions of US dollars and are for the year 2019.

Forbes 2000 ranking	Name	Headquarters	Revenue (billions US$)	Profit (billions US$)	Assets (billions US$)	Value (billions US$)	Industry
5	Saudi Aramco	Dhahran	329.8	88.2	398.3	1,900	Oil and gas
212	Saudi Basic Industries	Riyadh	37.3	1.5	83.4	59.8	Chemicals
315	Saudi Telecom Company	Riyadh	14.6	2.9	32.1	48.3	Telecommunications
396	Saudi National Bank	Riyadh	6.8	3.1	135.2	29.6	Banking
473	Al-Rajhi Bank	Riyadh	5.3	2.8	102.4	38.1	Banking
590	Saudi Electricity Company	Riyadh	17.3	0.4	127.9	18.9	Utilities
709	Riyad Bank	Riyadh	3.8	1.5	70.9	13.6	Banking
780	Samba Financial Group	Riyadh	2.8	1.1	68.1	12.4	Finance
814	Saudi British Bank	Riyadh	2.9	0.8	70.8	13.5	Banking
934	Banque Saudi Fransi	Riyadh	2.5	0.9	47.5	9.9	Banking
1013	Arab National Bank	Riyadh	2.3	0.8	48.9	8.2	Banking
1124	Alinma Bank	Riyadh	1.8	0.7	35.1	8.4	Banking
1508	Maaden	Riyadh	4.7	-0.2	26.0	12.2	Mining
1681	Almarai	Riyadh	3.9	0.5	8.7	13.1	Food processing

== See also ==
- List of companies of Saudi Arabia
- List of largest companies by revenue
