= Arabian Machinery and Heavy Equipment Company =

Heavy Machinery company based in Saudi Arabia

Arabian Machinery & Heavy Equipment Co.
- Native name: الشركة العربية للآلات والمعدات الثقيلة
- Company type: Private
- Industry: Heavy equipment
- Founded: 2006; 20 years ago
- Headquarters: Khobar, Saudi Arabia
- Key people: Abdullah Al-Suwaiket (CEO); Mohammad Al-Suwaiket (Chief Shared Services Officer)
- Products: Heavy lifting Crane and heavy equipment rental Transportation; Facility management Rig move services
- Website: amhec.com.sa

Arabian Machinery & Heavy Equipment Company (AMHEC; Arabic: الشركة العربية للآلات والمعدات الثقيلة) is a company based in Khobar, Saudi Arabia. AMHEC specializes in a wide range of services, including heavy equipment, transportation, facility management, and rig move services.

== Background ==
AMHEC was founded in the year 2006. In 2007, the company resumed its operation in the fields of crane rental, heavy equipment rental, transportation and heavy lifting services. In 2017, the company entered the fields of facility management and rig move services, working with contractors such as Saudi Aramco and SABIC.

AMHEC's total fleet consists of more than 500 heavy duty cranes, with a carrying capacity ranging from 50 to 500 tons.

As of early 2024, the company's fleet of cranes for rental consists of more the 300 cranes, around 200 of which are manufactured by Tadano.

In March 2024, AMHEC made a record order of 55 mobile cranes from Saudi Liebherr Company, ranging from a capacity of 100 to 800 tons. The order marks the largest which Saudi Liebherr received in its history. Upon completion, the order will take AMHEC's fleet to more than 500 cranes. In addition, it will increase its maximum carrying capacity from 500 to 800 tons.

== See also ==
- List of companies of Saudi Arabia
- Saudi Vision 2030
