= BQS =

BQS may refer to:

== Transport ==
- Basti Qutab railway station, Pakistan (BQS)
- Bunker quantity survey, a measure of fuel delivered to a ship
- Bus queue shelter
- Ignatyevo Airport, Russia (IATA:BQS)

== Other uses ==
- Bosmun language, spoken on New Guinea (ISO 639:bqs)
- 1,4-dihydrobenzoquinone-2-sulfonic acid (BQS) in flow batteries

== See also ==
- BOS (disambiguation)
- BQ (disambiguation)
