= Saudi Maritime and Logistics Congress =

Saudi Maritime and Logistics Congress المؤتمر السعودي البحري واللوجستي
- Genre: Maritime, Logistics & Supply Chain
- Frequency: Annual
- Venue: Jeddah Super Dome
- Locations: Dammam, Eastern Province
- Country: Saudi Arabia
- Inaugurated: 2014
- Next event: 21 – 22 October 2026
- Attendance: 14,000+ (2025)
- Patrons: Minister of Transport and Logistics Services of Saudi Arabia
- Organiser: Informa Markets, Seatrade Maritime, Tahaluf
- Website: saudimaritimecongress.com

The Saudi Maritime and Logistics Congress (Arabic: المؤتمر السعودي البحري واللوجستي; formerly the Saudi Maritime Congress, also referred to as SMLC), is an annual international maritime exhibition and conference held in Jeddah, Saudi Arabia, focusing on the maritime, shipping, ports, and logistics sectors.

Organised by Informa Markets through its Jeddah Super Dome brand and its Saudi Arabia joint venture Tahaluf.

Its Founding Strategic Partner is the National Shipping Company of Saudi Arabia (Bahri), with recurring partnerships from the Saudi Ports Authority (Mawani), the Transport General Authority (TGA), and Saudi Aramco.

== History ==
The Saudi Maritime Congress was first held in 2014 in Dammam. It was established as a forum for government entities and logistics specialists to discuss the development of Saudi Arabia's maritime sector.

The 2020 edition of the Saudi Maritime Congress was originally scheduled for March 22–23, 2020, but was cancelled because of international travel restrictions and the COVID-19 pandemic. In January 2020, International Maritime Industries (IMI) was announced as a strategic partner of the 2020 edition of the congress.

The congress took place on 28–29 September 2022 in Dammam. The programme focused on digitalisation and modern technology in the maritime sector, including autonomous applications, big data, and decarbonisation solutions aligned with targets set by the International Maritime Organization (IMO).

The 2023 edition was held on 20–21 September 2023 in Dammam. The 2023 edition focused on ship management, offshore energy transition, maritime education, Environmental, Social, and Governance (ESG) considerations, and smart port developments, and smart port developments.

The programme sessions covered the expansion of logistics hubs and railway connectivity, the digitisation of vessel operations, and developments, including the NEOM project and its Oxagon floating industrial island.

The fifth edition took place on 18–19 September 2024 at Dhahran Expo in Dammam. Partners for the 2024 edition were Bahri and Seatrade Maritime as founding partners, Mawani and TGA as main partners, and Saudi Aramco and IMI as strategic partners.

The sixth edition was held on 1 October 2025 at Dhahran Expo in Dammam. Speakers included Minister of Transport and Logistics Services Saleh bin Nasser Al-Jasser.

== Format ==
The congress runs over two days, combining a conference programme with an international trade exhibition. Sessions are hosted across a main plenary stage and a secondary stage, featuring keynote addresses, panel discussions, and specialist presentations. Attendees have included government ministers, shipping executives, maritime regulators, investors, and academics. The event is free to attend.

== See also ==
- Bahri (company)
- Saudi Ports Authority
