= Certificate of Financial Responsibility =

The Certificate of Financial Responsibility (COFR) program was created to ensure that tankers, barges, and other vessels used to transport oil and chemical-based products on U.S. should bear any ensuing cleanup costs from spills or leaks. This is based on the Oil Pollution Act of 1990 and other environmental statutes.

== Administration ==
The COFR program is administered by The U.S. Coast Guard’s National Pollution Funds Center (NPFC). The Vessel Certification Division of the NPFC ensures that responsible parties are identified and held responsible for the expenses incurred during a water pollution incident.

A COFR is issued to vessel operators once they have shown the can pay cleanup and damage costs up to the liability limits required by the Oil Pollution Act.

=== Aramco Financial Services Company ===
Aramco Financial Services Company (AFSC) is a wholly owned subsidiary of Saudi Refining, Inc., and ultimately of Aramco Services Company. AFSC serves as the financial guarantor for the Certificates of Financial Responsibility issued by the U.S. Coast Guard to the tanker fleet owned and operated by Vela International Marine, Ltd. This service guarantees the financial liability obligations of the Vela fleet under the Oil Pollution Act of 1990, and ensures the ability of Vela-owned tankers to deliver crude shipments to U.S. ports.

== Conditions of Compliance ==
With a few limited exceptions, vessels greater than 300 gross tons and vessels of any size that are transferring oil between vessels or shipping oil in the Exclusive Economic Zone (EEZ) are required to comply with the COFR regulations in order to operate in U.S. waters.

== Penalties ==
Operators who do not comply with the COFR requirements are subject to:

- Detainment
- Denial of entry into U.S. ports
- Civil penalties of up to $32,500 per day
- Seizure or forfeiture of the vessel

== See also ==
- Shoreline Managers
