= MV Sirius Star =

Saudi oil tanker

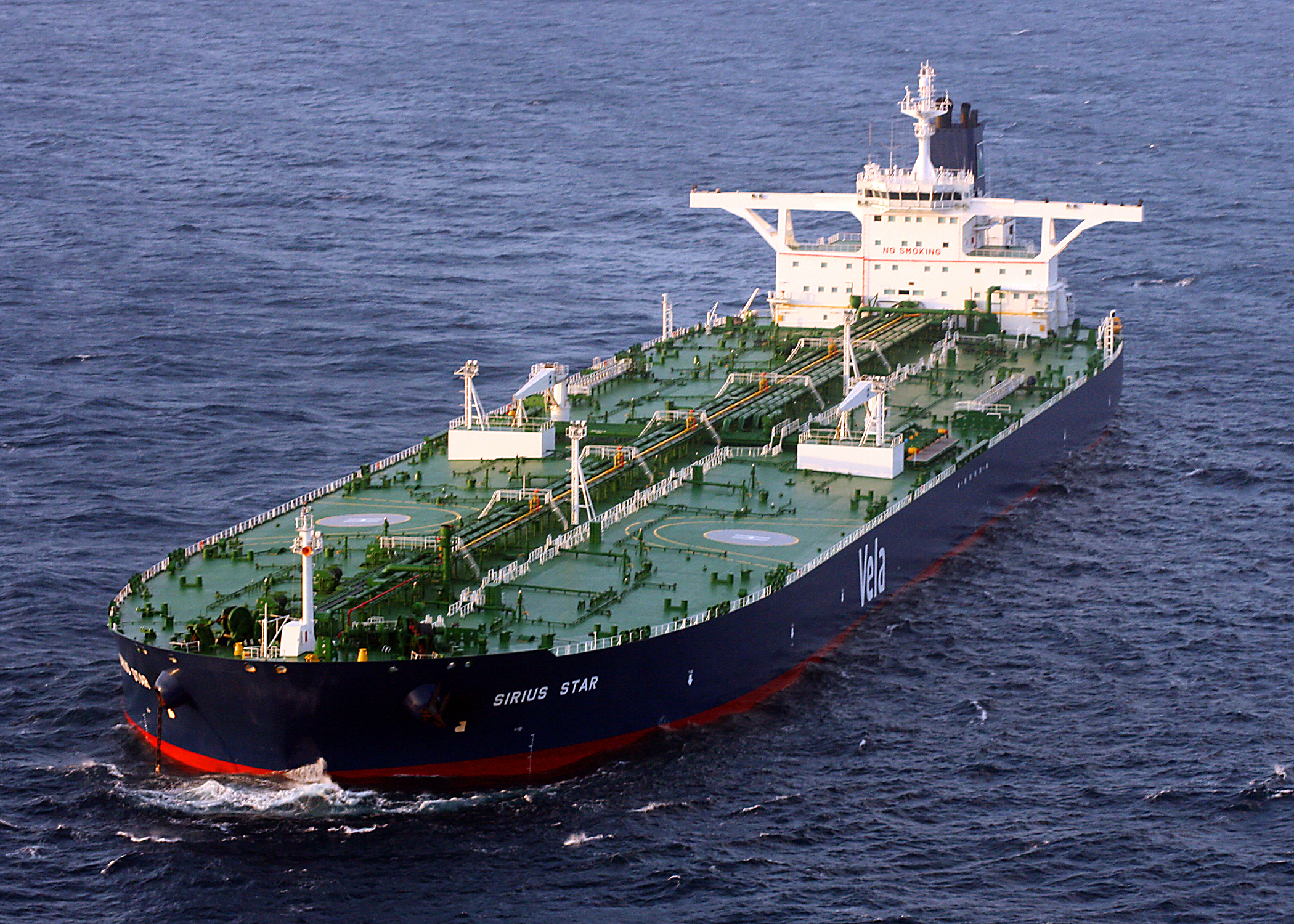
- The hijacked Sirius Star as photographed by the U.S. Navy.

History
- Name: Sapphire Shine
- Owner: Vela International Marine
- Operator: Vela International Marine
- Port of registry: Saudi Arabia
- Builder: Daewoo Shipbuilding & Marine Engineering
- Yard number: 5302
- Laid down: 29 October 2007
- Launched: 28 March 2008
- Identification: Call sign: A8NA7; DNV ID: 29210; IMO number: 9384198; MMSI number: 636013447
- Status: In service

General characteristics
- Type: VLCC Oil tanker
- Tonnage: 162,252 GT; 111,896 NT; 318,000 DWT
- Length: 332 m (1,089 ft 3 in)
- Beam: 60 m (196 ft 10 in)
- Draught: 22.5 m (73 ft 10 in)
- Propulsion: one propeller, diesel
- Crew: 26

MV Sapphire Shine (formerly MV Sirius Star) is an oil tanker formally owned and operated by Vela International Marine. With a length overall of 330 m (1,080 ft) and a capacity of 2.2 million barrels (350,000 m^{3}) of crude oil, she is classified as a very large crude carrier or VLCC. Vela is based in the United Arab Emirates and is a subsidiary of the Saudi Arabian state oil company Saudi Aramco. Sirius Star is one of Vela's 24 tankers, of which 19 are VLCCs. Since her launch, the ship has been registered in Monrovia under the Liberian flag of convenience. She has since been reflagged to Saudi Arabia.

Sirius Star was built by the South Korean company Daewoo Shipbuilding & Marine Engineering. Her construction began in October 2007 and she was launched by Huda Al-Ghoson in late March 2008.

She received international attention when she was hijacked by Somali pirates (allegedly under the orders of piracy kingpin Mohamed Abdi Hassan) on 15 November 2008, becoming the largest ship ever captured by pirates. She was en route from Saudi Arabia to the United States by way of the Cape of Good Hope. At the time of the attack, she was about 450 nautical miles (830 km) southeast of the coast of Kenya, carrying 25 crewmen and her tanks fully loaded with oil. She was estimated to be worth approximately US$150 million, with her cargo worth at least US$100 million.

Sirius Star was released on 9 January 2009 after payment of a US$3 million ransom. Three other VLCCs that have been ransomed by pirates are Samho Dream, Maran Centaurus and Irene SL.

== Design and construction ==
Sapphire Shine is a double-hulled oil tanker with a length overall of 332 metres (1,089 ft), a beam of 60 metres (200 ft), a hull depth of 31 metres (102 ft), and a draft of 22.5 metres (74 ft). She can carry 2.2 million barrels (350,000 m^{3}) of crude oil. She has a gross tonnage of 162,252 and a total cargo capacity of 318,000 tonnes deadweight (DWT). Vessels of this size are classified as very large crude carriers or VLCCs.

She was built by Daewoo Shipbuilding & Marine Engineering (DSME) in Okpo, Geoje, South Korea. Her keel was laid on 29 October 2007. Designated as hull number 5302, she was the 100th VLCC built by DSME.

Sirius Star was launched by Huda Al-Ghoson on 28 March 2008. The launch marked the first time a Saudi woman performed such a ceremony for Vela.

== Career ==
Sapphire Shine is one of 24 tankers owned and operated by Vela, of which 19 are VLCCs. Vela, based in the United Arab Emirates is a subsidiary of the Saudi Arabian state oil company Saudi Aramco. Since her launch, the ship has been registered under the Liberian flag and homeported in Monrovia. In 2014 she was reflagged to Saudi Arabia

== Incidents and accidents ==
=== Hijacking ===
According to the U.S. Navy, Sirius Star was attacked approximately 450 nautical miles (830 km) southeast of the Kenyan coast.

On 17 November 2008, the U.S. Navy announced Sirius Star was hijacked by Somali pirates. Lt. Nate Christensen, a spokesman for the U.S. Navy's 5th Fleet, said the pirates hijacked the very large crude carrier at about 10:00 a.m. on Saturday, 15 November, while she was southbound, about 450 nautical miles (830 km; 520 mi) southeast of the coast of Kenya at 04°41′S 48°43′E — the farthest out to sea Somali pirates have struck. The attack also made Sirius Star the largest vessel ever to be hijacked. It is estimated that for the pirates to reach Sirius Star, they must have voyaged south for three to four days.

At the time of the attack, the ship was carrying a full load of 2 million barrels (320,000 m^{3}) of crude oil — more than one-quarter of Saudi Arabia's daily oil production output, and worth at least US$100 million — and was bound for the United States via the Cape of Good Hope. According to officials from Puntland, the pirates anchored Sirius Star at the Somali port of Harardhere, contrary to early reports from the United States Navy that she was anchored near Eyl.

As a result of the full load of cargo, the height from the main deck to the waterline was relatively low; if the reported 22 m (72 ft) draft was correct, her freeboard was about 9 metres (30 ft). Ships in this low-freeboard condition are easier to climb aboard and thus easier targets for pirates.

The 26 member crew, consisting of 19 Filipinos, 2 Britons, 2 Poles, 2 Croat and 1 Saudi Arabian, were reported to be safe. On 18 November 2008, Polish media confirmed that the two Polish officers on board were the Captain Marek Niski and technical officer Leszek Adler. On 19 November 2008, Britain's Foreign and Commonwealth Office named two of the British officers aboard the vessel: Chief Engineer Peter French of County Durham and second officer James Grady of Strathclyde.

On 18 November 2008 the pirates opened negotiations with Vela. In a press release dated that day, Vela stated that all crewmembers were safe. In the same press release, the company said it was working towards a "safe and speedy return" of all crewmembers, leaving open the possibility of ransom payment.

=== Ransom demand and deadline ===
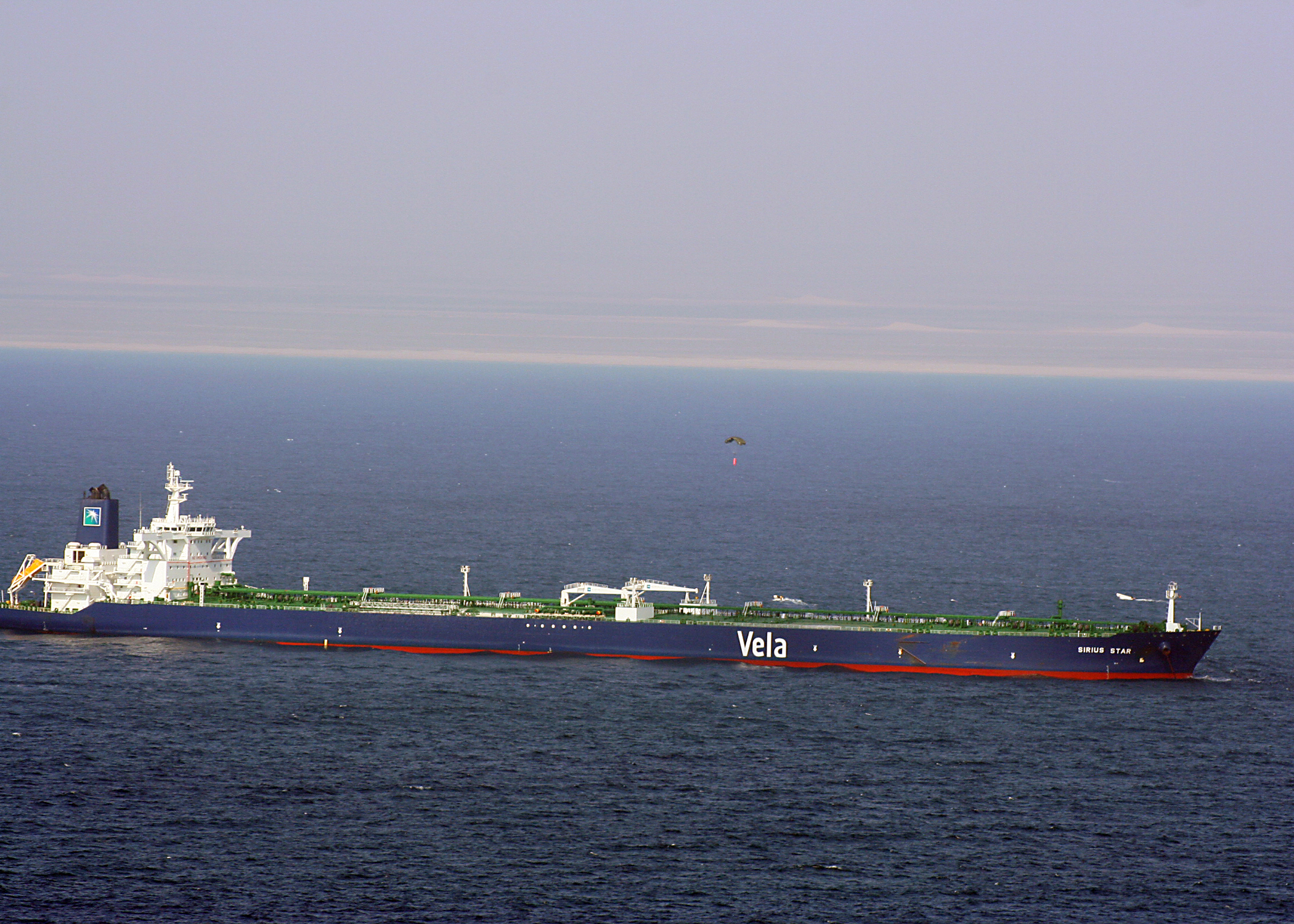
Ransom being dropped by parachute on 9 January 2009

Sirius Star was anchored near the Somali port town of Harardhere.

On 19 November, the alleged pirate, Farah Abd Jameh, provided information regarding the ransom by audio tape broadcast over Al-Jazeera television. The tape specified that an unspecified cash ransom was to be delivered to Sirius Star, where it would be counted using machines that were able to detect counterfeit bills.

On 20 November, the pirates demanded a US$25 million ransom having set a 10-day deadline. Mohamed Said stated: "We do not want long-term discussions to resolve the matter. The Saudis have 10 days to comply, otherwise we will take action that could be disastrous." The then Foreign Secretary David Miliband ruled out the UK paying any form of ransom, saying "There is a strong view of the British Government, and actually the international community, that payments for hostage-taking are only an encouragement to further hostage-taking." By 24 November, the pirates had reduced their ransom demand to US$15 million.

A small faction of Somali Islamic rebels planned to attack Sirius Star to liberate her from her hijackers. The faction's planned attack on the hijackers is seen in retaliation for them seizing a "Muslim" vessel. Locals in Harardhere have said the threats of attack from Islamic militants have forced the pirates to leave the port and remain approximately 54 nmi (100 km; 62 mi) offshore. A spokesman for the Islamic rebel group, Abdirahim Isse Adow, stated "We are against this act and we shall hunt the ship wherever she sails, and free it."

=== Ransom and release ===
Sirius Star was freed On 9 January 2009 after a US$3 million ransom payment. Five of the "dozens" of pirates drowned after their small boat capsized in a storm after leaving Sirius Star with their share of the ransom. The body of one of the pirates that drowned later washed ashore with US$153,000 in cash in a plastic bag.

After her release, Sirius Star sailed to the port of Fujairah in the UAE, and the crew was replaced.

=== Effects of the hijacking ===
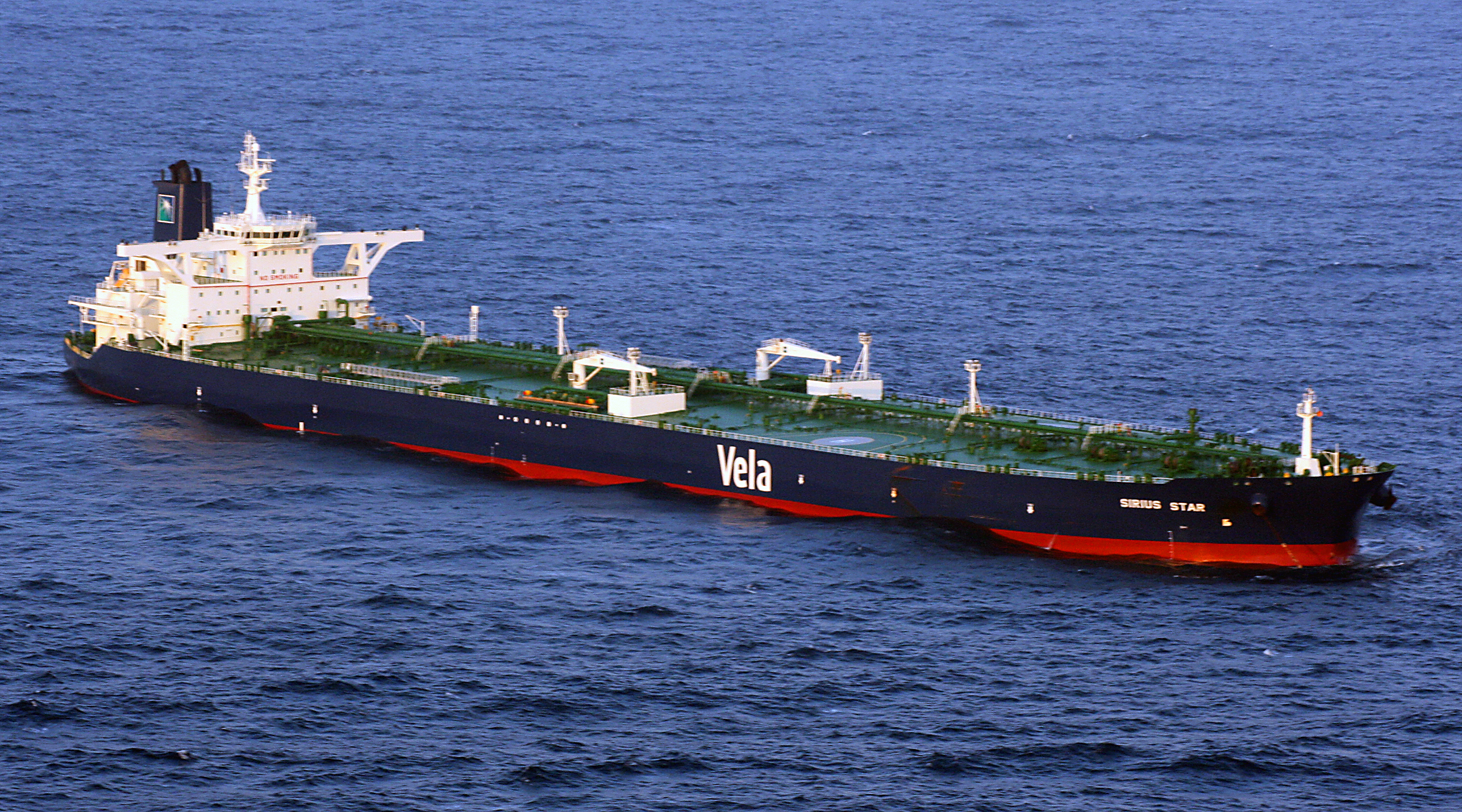
After hijack the vessel was anchored at Harardhere, Somalia

The attack came soon after naval forces from NATO, Russia, and India began to patrol the Horn of Africa region, in response to MV Faina hijacking seven weeks earlier and many other incidents. However, these patrols focus further north, especially near the Gulf of Aden, and the attack came as a surprise. A British intelligence expert commented that "there will never be enough warships" to secure so much of the Indian Ocean by patrol.

This attack has shown that the pirates are now operating in an area of over 2.8 million square kilometers (1.1 million square miles), which extends beyond the recently established international patrols closer to the Horn of Africa. News of the attack raised crude oil prices on global markets.

The hijacking was shocking because it highlighted the vulnerability of even very large ships and pointed to widening ambitions and capabilities among ransom-hungry pirates who have carried out a surge of attacks this year off Somalia. To attack so large a vessel and so far south of Somalia presents a nearly impossible security problem for the anti-piracy naval task force.

— Lieutenant Nate Christensen, spokesman for the US Navy's Fifth Fleet, CNN.com
