= BQ =

BQ, Bq, or bq may refer to:

== Places ==
- Navassa Island (FIPS PUB 10-4 territory code BQ)
- Caribbean Netherlands (ISO 3166-1 alpha-2 country code)
  - .bq, the country-code Top Level Domain for Caribbean Netherlands
- British Antarctic Territory (former ISO 3166-1 alpha-2 country code)

== Businesses and organizations ==
- Aeromar Líneas Aéreas Dominicanas (IATA airline designator BQ)
- Bin Quraya, leading heavy equipment rental firm in Saudi Arabia
- Birds Queensland, the ornithological society of Queensland, Australia
- Bloc Québécois, a political party of Canada
- BQ (company), a Spanish user electronics company
  - BQ Aquaris, the company's brand of devices

== Science and technology ==
- Becquerel (Bq), the SI derived unit of radioactivity
- Benzoquinone, a chemical compound
- BQ.1 and BQ.1.1 (Cerberus), SARS-CoV-2 Omicron variants
- BQ-788, a selective ETB antagonist
- BQ-123, a cyclic peptide
- Broadcast quality, a video quality standard for broadcast television

== Other uses ==
- Boston Qualifier, a qualifier in the Boston Marathon
- Band Queer, etymologically Band Qualified, a member of the Fightin' Texas Aggie Band
- Blood quantum laws, laws in the United States that define Native American status by fractions of Native American ancestry.

== See also ==
- BBQ, shorthand for barbecue
- BQS (disambiguation)
- B&Q, a British retailer
