= Shoreline Managers =

American marine insurance company

Shoreline Managers Ltd
- Industry: marine insurance
- Founded: December 28, 1994

Shoreline Managers Ltd is an American marine insurance company. It supplies guarantees to the US Coast Guard to enable a Certificate of Financial Responsibility to be issued to its members, and has been doing so since becoming operational in conjunction with the effective date of the legislation, December 28, 1994. Shoreline Mutual's sole activity is to act as a guarantor on behalf of its members, and is authorized by the US Coast Guard for the purpose of issuing guarantees up to the limits required by Oil Pollution Act 1990 legislation. It is managed by Shoreline Insurance Managers Limited, but there is a board of directors made up of representatives of Shoreline Mutual's members who provide executive oversight. These include Gregory McGrath who is CFO at Omega Navigation Enterprises, and Carolyn Webster who is Risk Manager at Disney Cruise Line. Edward Ross, who is the Insurance Coordinator at Zodiac Maritime Agencies Ltd, is the acting chairman of the Shoreline Board of Directors.

The Oil Pollution Act of 1990 was introduced in the wake of the Exxon Valdez oil spill of 1989. Under this legislation every ship entering United States waters has to prove evidence of its ability to pay for the consequences of oil pollution.

The US Coast Guard issues a Certificate of Financial Responsibility which proves that the potential polluter has both the means and ability to pay for the consequences of such a spill up to the limits specified under Oil Pollution Act 1990.
