= Civil and Electrical Projects Contracting Company =

Saudi Arabian construction company

Civil & Electrical Projects Contracting Company (CEPCO)
- Founded: 1977
- Headquarters: Jeddah, Saudi Arabia
- Key people: Tarek Alhusayni(CEO); Mohamed El Azem (Managing DIrector); Nour Al Hussayni (General Manager)
- Website: http://www.cepco-sa.com

The Civil and Electrical Projects Contracting Company (CEPCO) is a construction company with corporate headquarters in Jeddah, Saudi Arabia, with offices throughout Saudi Arabia and in the Middle East. CEPCO has been in business since 1977 and provides construction services in the fields of installations, maintenance, testing & commissioning, HDD, HV civil works, telecommunications and water testing.

CEPCO executes projects for civil and electrical projects in Saudi Arabia and GCC countries, especially in the field of 110 KV up to 380 KV Cable Systems, Delivery, Installation and Testing of Transformers and Substation Construction. In the early 1990s, CEPCO also provided similar services in both Syria and Lebanon. However, since the start of the 21st century, those services have been discontinued.

CEPCO is a qualified turn-key general contractor with Saudi Electricity Company – Western, Eastern, Southern and Central Regions.

CEPCO has executed a number of projects and had a turnover in excess of $150 million in 2007 and $500 million until the end of 2008.

In addition to construction services, CEPCO is an authorized agent for world-class manufacturers and provides related support and field services. As a privately owned company, CEPCO's current strategy is to enhance its growth by building the company's resources and perfection of services provided.

== Project fields ==
=== Civil and Infrastructure ===
Specialized for turn-key contracts for water distribution, rainwater evacuation schemes, large water reservoirs and pumping stations, underground tunneling (HDD Technology), sewage systems etc., starting from design, site preparation, interface, material supply, execution, installation and commissioning. The activities include all required electro-mechanical installation for buildings, industrial plants and underground cables and piping.

Volumes of projects executed and currently ongoing projects ranges from $10–200 million.

- Residential, Commercial and Industrial Buildings
- Roads and Bridges
- Water & Wastewater Treatment Plants and Transmission Networks

=== Electrical ===
The main activities are in the field of Low, Medium and High Voltage Power Engineering works in Saudi Arabia and GCC countries. These include installation, testing, commissioning and maintenance works for Substations, Transformers, Switchgears and High Voltage Underground XLPE and Oil-Filled cable systems for voltage between 69 KV up to 380 KV with the latest & state-of-the-art testing equipment.

- Overhead Transmission
- Underground Transmission
- Substations and Transformers
- Cable Laying and Splicing, Low Voltage, Medium Voltage, High Voltage & Fiber-Optic.
- Communications Infrastructure, Wireless and Wireline.

=== Electromechanical ===
CEPCO's electro-mechanical Division caters to large Saudi Arabian/Multinational Companies for their electro-mechanical requirements, including supply, installation and maintenance of Centralized Air Conditioning Systems, A/C Ducting, Chilled Water Piping Systems, Sewage and Water Piping Systems, etc.

- Power Plant Utilities
- Instrumentation & Control
- HVAC & Plumbing
- Building Management Systems
- Fire Protection Systems
- Pumping and Metering Stations
- MEP Engineering

=== Oil, Gas and Power ===
The Persian Gulf region is experiencing tremendous growth in the Engineering, Procurement & Contracting in the Oil, Gas and Petrochemical fields, creating a shortage of capable companies that can perform the projects. Based on CEPCO's dynamic growth and past achievements, the company is expanding its EP&C capabilities in the oil, gas and petrochemical fields. CEPCO's EP&C capabilities include:

- Project Management, Procurement and Construction

- Electrical and Instrumentation Services

- Onshore pipe fabrication and onsite works

- Onshore installation of pressure vessels, columns and module package equipment

CEPCO has performed work for Saudi Aramco, the world's largest oil company, in the upstream sector and the midstream sector.

- Power Plants
- Cement Plants
- Crude Oil Refining
- Oil & Gas Treatment & Processing Plants
- Oil & Gas Pipelines
- Retrofits, Upgrades and Shutdown projects

== Trade ==
Specialist in procurement and supply of different equipment and materials for Power Generation and Distribution to various companies and establishments throughout Saudi Arabia/Middle East.

CEPCO is an agent to over nine international companies, selling products in electrical testing, SF6 gas handling, high voltage cable accessories, transformer tap changers and others. We have been working with well-established European and Asian companies for over 25 years, selling their products and servicing them in the Kingdom.

CEPCO is the authorized Distributor and Service Agent for the following establishments:

=== Authorized agents ===
- Pfisterer Ixosil AG
- Highvolt Prueftechnik Dresden GmbH
- Baur Pruf Und Messtechnik
- MR
- Fuji Tecom Inc
- DILO
- Megger Ltd.
- Micafluid AG
- Metrel

=== Associates/Partners ===
- ILF Consulting Engineers
- Suedkabel
- Sumitomo Corporation
- Viscas (Fujikura)
- LG
- Taihan
- Nexans
- Siemens
- ABB
- Saudi Cable
- Riyadh Cables
- METS
