= SACO Hardware =

Saudi Arabian hardware retailing and wholesaling business

Saudi Company for Hardware SACO
- Trade name: SACO
- ISIN: SA13Q051UK14
- Industry: Retail
- Founded: November 19, 1984; 41 years ago
- Founder: Al Hamidi Family, Abdulrahman Sharbatly, Abrar
- Headquarters: Riyadh, Saudi Arabia
- Number of locations: 34 (as of August 2020)
- Key people: Abdulrahman Jawa (Chairman of the Board); Sameer Mohammed Abdulaziz Al Hamidi (Managing Director); Abdel-Salam Bdeir (CEO); Amer Omar (CFO)
- Revenue: 1,457,000,000 Saudi riyal (2019)
- Net income: ▼61,637 SAR (2019)
- Total assets: ▲1,763,385 SAR (2019)
- Number of employees: 2,435

SACO (Saudi Company for Hardware) is a provider of home improvement products in Saudi Arabia. Founded in 1984, SACO started out with one store in Riyadh. Over the next two decades, the company expanded its reach across the country and, to date, operates 34 stores in 18 cities, including five stores (known as SACO World), each occupying between 2,350 and 24,500 square meters.

== History ==
SACO was established in Riyadh in 1984 by a small group of entrepreneurs. Two decades later, in May 2004, the company set out to open SACO World in Riyadh, the largest, first-of-its-kind store in the Middle East. In June 2010, the company built its second SACO World in the Red Sea port city of Jeddah, and a year after that opened its largest superstore yet in the eastern province of Dhahran.

In 2015, it became a publicly listed company. In 2018, SACO opened its 31st store and, today, it has 34 stores across the country, with plans in the works to build more stores in the coming years.

SACO acquired Medscan Terminal, a Saudi-based logistics service provider, in 2016. Amongst its latest endeavours are the launch of its new website and an e-commerce app.

== Products and services ==
- SACO carries a wide range of products that fall under seven departments: Tools and Hardware, Outdoor and Garden, Home Essentials, Home Improvement, Automotive, Electronics, and Sports, Fitness, and Toys.

- SACO also offers three main areas of services: Delivery and Assembly, Installation, and Item Warranty and Maintenance.
