= Saudi Readymix Concrete Company =

Coordinates: 26°18′9.43″N 50°12′41.93″E

Saudi Readymix Concrete Company Ltd. (Saudi Readymix)
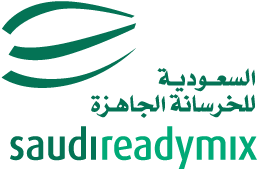
- Company type: Privately held company, Limited
- Industry: Construction, Manufacturing
- Founded: 1978
- Headquarters: Khobar, Saudi Arabia
- Key people: Rami K. Alturki Chairman and President
- Products: Ready-mixed concrete Construction aggregates Concrete blocks Interlocking concrete pavers
- Revenue: ▲SAR 1.4 Billion (2010)
- Net income: ▼SAR 95 Million (2010)
- Number of employees: 2,900+
- Website: www.saudireadymix.com.sa

Saudi Readymix Concrete Company Ltd. is a producer and supplier of ready-mix concrete and related products in Saudi Arabia. The company is based in Khobar, Saudi Arabia, operates 20 commercial and 10 on-site factories, and is involved in many projects all over the kingdom.

As of 2008, Saudi Readymix grew to a work force of over 2,500 employees (2,900+ as of June 18, 2011), reached production of over 5,000,000 m^{3} of concrete a year, and amassed a fleet of more than 400 mixer trucks, some of which are GPS equipped, 150 mobile and stationary pumps, and 3 aggregate quarries.

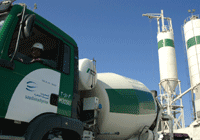
Saudi Readymix concrete mixer truck in front of their factory silos

== History ==
Saudi Readymix Concrete Company Ltd. was founded in 1978. Production began with the establishment of the company's first factory, located in Saihat, Saudi Arabia, and continued and expanded its operations with the establishment of two on-site factories, one in each of Abqaiq and Jubail, Saudi Arabia.

Over the next 20 years, Saudi Readymix continued to grow in size and production by opening a block plant in Jubail, a ready-mixed concrete factory in the 1st industrial City in Dammam, factories outside of the Eastern Province in each of Riyadh and Jeddah, and acquiring its first quarry in Abu Hadriyah (more than 134 km NW of Dammam).

In 1998, Saudi Readymix Concrete Company Ltd. merged with Inma Construction Materials Co. Ltd. and became a wholly owned subsidiary of Khalid Ali Alturki & Sons' group of companies (better known as Alturki).

== Professional affiliations ==
Saudi Readymix is affiliated with the following entities through accreditation by, cooperation with or, simply, by practicing the guidelines of:

- Occupational Safety and Health Administration (OSHA)
- American Society for Testing and Materials (ASTM)
- American Concrete Institute (ACI)
- British Standards Institution (BSI)
- German Standards Institute (DIN)
- US National Ready Mixed Concrete Association (NRMCA)
- Pennsylvania Concrete Association
- US Portland Cement Association
- UK Construction Industry Research and Information Association (CIRIA)
- UK Concrete Society
- Saudi Aramco Research Laboratory
- King Fahd University of Petroleum and Minerals Research Laboratory

== Achievements, records and awards ==
Saudi Readymix Concrete Company Ltd. has accomplished several achievements, broke local records and is accredited with several awards:

- Recognized as one of the best Saudi companies to work for.
- Two time recipient of Saudi fast growth.
- Listed and ranked as one of top 100 Saudi companies for six years in a row.
- One of the companies mentioned and ranked 33rd for first participation in 2011.
- Produces over 5,000,000 m^{3} of concrete a year.
- Paved the largest concrete pour in Saudi Arabia.
- Set up of biggest on-site concrete production facility in Saudi Arabia at KAUST.
