= Yanbu National Petrochemical Company =

Saudi Arabian company

Coordinates: 23°58′57″N 38°15′45″E

Yanbu National Petrochemical Company (Yansab) شركة ينبع الوطنية للبتروكيماويات
- Type: Joint stock
- ISIN: SA000A0HNF36
- Industry: Petrochemical
- Founded: February 11, 2006; 20 years ago
- Headquarters: , Yanbu, Saudi Arabia
- Key people: Faisal Al Suwailem (Chairman); Mohammed Bazaid (CEO)
- Products: Ethylene, Propylene, Mono Ethylene Glycol, Diethylene glycol, Ethylene glycol, Polypropylene, Linear low-density polyethylene, High-density polyethylene, 1-Butene, 2-Butene, MTBE, Benzene
- Revenue: 1,653,435,000 Saudi riyal (2019)
- Total assets: 18,070,407,000 Saudi riyal (2019)
- Website: http://www.yansab.com.sa

Yansab is a SABIC, affiliate company in Saudi Arabia, and is the largest SABIC petrochemical complex. It will has an annual capacity exceeding 4 million metric tons (MT) of petrochemical products including: 1.3 million MT (metric-tons) of ethylene; 400,000 MT of propylene; 900,000 MT of polyethylene; 400,000 MT of polypropylene; 700,000 MT of ethylene glycol; 250,000 MT of benzene, xylene and toluene, and 100,000 MT of butene-1 and butene-2.

Yansab is expected to employ 1,500 people in phase I and phase II.

SABIC owns 55% of YANSAB capital. SABIC affiliates Ibn Rushd and Tayef hold 10% of Yansab capital. 35% of Yansab is public stocks.

Fluor Arabia is the main U&O contractor on the Yansab project.
