= Bunker quantity survey =

A bunker quantity survey (BQS), also known as a bunker quantity audit or simply a bunker survey, is a quantitative examination and assessment of fuel oil (bunker fuel) transferred from one party to another.

In the maritime industry, a BQS is conducted when a supply vessel (typically a bunker barge or shore tank) delivers fuel oil to a recipient vessel (typically a commercial marine vessel) as an audit to the transaction between the buyer and the seller. Alternatively, in certain cases, a BQS may also be conducted when the buyer/seller roles are reversed, as seen with "debunkering" operations, for example.

A BQS is a commonly used loss control tool to track significant variances of cargo quantities between the supplier and receiver. Since bunker fuel is often the largest financial cost driver to the operation of a vessel, a BQS is considered a critical service to ensure correct quantities of fuel are delivered.

== Purpose ==
Due to the dynamic location of vessels, particularly those involved in maritime transport, the physical transfer of fuel (bunkering) often takes place thousands of miles from each party's contracting offices. As such, neither the buyer nor seller is usually present to witness the physical transfer and procedures involved, thus any quantity or procedural dispute is often futile and inconclusive. When such disputes arise, they can create unnecessary protests, legal fees, demurrage, loss of management time, and loss of good will for all stakeholders. A BQS performed by an impartial party can alleviate many of the stressors involved in the purchase and sale of bunker fuel, and ensure both parties are treated fairly from a financial standpoint.

== Methods ==
While the specific methods of measuring liquid hydrocarbons, and subsequently a BQS, can vary based on circumstances such as location, available equipment, and accessibility, the general principals converge to certain key procedures. While each BQS provider may vary within the methodology, the underlying procedures typically involve measuring the cargo volumes and temperatures on both the supplying and receiving vessels before and after the cargo transfer.

== Assessments ==
=== Quantitative ===
Quantitative assessments in bunker quantity surveys involve physical, measurable, and quantifiable variables of bunker fuel and delivery. These aspects revolve around temperature, density, volume, and their respective methods of calculation. The quantitative assessment of fuel quantity audits and surveys are typically what one would expect from a BQS, as such variables can be both physically measured and independently verified. Most BQS services focus primarily, and often exclusively, on the quantitative aspects, as they focus on the general principles of thermodynamics and follow international standardized methods, thus can often be referenced without protest by both parties.

=== Qualitative ===
As a relatively newer method in quantity based surveys, qualitative assessments in BQS focus more on the conditional and dependent aspects of each operation. Such methods focus on human error, local regulations and procedures, and financial cost drivers and ratios. These methods are often used in conjunction with the quantitative assessments mentioned earlier to provide a more holistic survey as opposed to a strict quantity inspection. Qualitative assessments are used primarily when the BQS is requested by one party only (as opposed to both), and focus on reducing operational costs for the client.

== Importance ==
While a BQS is not always a legal requirement when taking bunker fuel, the service plays an important role in managing the continuity of relationships between fuel suppliers and consumers. Depending on where the fuel transfer operation takes place, different global ports have varying concerns when pertaining to the quantity of fuel delivered. While out right pilferage may be a common practice in some ports, thus citing an essential need for a BQS, procedural concerns may also warrant a BQS in ports where pilferage is not as common. Regardless of specific operational needs, BQS services are typically held in high regard as the cost to perform the surveys are often a small and insignificant cost relative to the overall cost of the fuel.
