= Saudia Dairy and Foodstuff Co. =

- Traded as: Tadawul: 2270
- ISIN: SA000A0EAXM3
- Industry: Agriculture
- Genre: Dairy
- Founded: April 21, 1976; 50 years ago
- Key people: Patrick Stillhart (CEO)
- Products: UHT milk, tomato paste, ice cream, cheese, instant milk powder, breakfast cream, fruit nectars, butter, and French fries
- Revenue: 634,742,000 Saudi riyal (2019)
- Total assets: 1,915,742,000 Saudi riyal (2019)
- Website: sadafco.com

Saudia Dairy and Foodstuff Co. (SADAFCO) is a Saudi Arabia-based dairy company.

== History ==
Saudia Dairy and Foodstuff Company (SADAFCO) was established on 21 April 1976 and began production in 1977. In 1990, three dairy companies merged to officially form SADAFCO. The company launched an initial public offering (IPO) on 23 May 2005, leading to its listing on the Saudi Stock Exchange (Tadawul).

In 2018, SADAFCO acquired a 76% stake in Poland’s Mlekoma for SAR 120 million to strengthen its supply of milk-based products. In 2019, the company completed its Jeddah Central Warehouse, the largest in its network, with a capacity of 42,000 pallets and a total investment of SAR 145 million.

== Operations ==
SADAFCO operates manufacturing facilities in Jeddah, Dammam, and Riyadh, with distribution centers across Saudi Arabia. The company produces a wide range of dairy and food products, including milk, tomato paste, ice cream, and snacks under the Saudia brand. In 2016, SADAFCO introduced a solar panels project to supply its Riyadh regional center with renewable energy.

In 2023, SADAFCO was included in Fortune Arabia’s inaugural Fortune 500 Arabia list, ranking 183rd among the most successful Arab companies.

Saudia Dairy and Foodstuff Co. (SADAFCO) experienced significant operational transitions, financial resilience, and infrastructure expansion across the 2024–2026 period. After shifting its fiscal year-end from March to December, the company focused on expanding its domestic presence under the flagship "Saudia" brand while optimizing its regional footprint through a distributor-heavy model.
