= BinDawood Stores =

Supermarket and hypermarket chain in Saudi Arabia

- Type: Retailer
- Industry: Hypermarket
- Headquarters: Jeddah, Saudi Arabia
- Number of locations: 87 (2023)
- Key people: Abdulrazzaq BinDawood; Ahmad AR. BinDawood
- Products: Retail - Hypermarket
- Revenue: SAR 5.6 billion (2023)
- Owner: Bindawood Holding
- Website: bindawood.com

BinDawood Stores is a supermarket and hypermarket chain in Saudi Arabia. It is owned by BinDawood Holding. The first BinDawood store was opened in Mecca, Saudi Arabia in 1984. As of August 2020, BinDawood operates 27 hypermarkets and supermarkets in the Kingdom in major cities such as Mecca and Madinah. In 2018, BinDawood superstores released the findings from an international survey conducted by Nielsen on behalf of BinDawood that was designed and developed to promote health awareness for those undertaking their Hajj pilgrimage. The survey was conducted across six of the source markets for Hajj pilgrims, Saudi Arabia, Pakistan, Egypt, Bangladesh, India and Indonesia. In April 2019, the BinDawood App, a digital eCommerce platform was launched.

In July 2022, BinDawood Holding Co. received approval from its shareholders to acquire an 80.5 percent stake in Ykone, a subsidiary of French TF1 Group. The acquisition would be made through its newly established French subsidiary Future Retail for Information Technology Co, and it will assist Ykone in improving the technology platform to enable the company to expand into other industries and verticals and to gain deeper access to the Middle Eastern markets.

== Financial performance ==
For the years 2020 and 2021, BinDawood Holding Co. posted revenues of SR 5.1 billion and SR 4.3 billion, with profits of SR 447 million and SR 240 million, respectively.
