= Tadano =

Japan-based Crane manufacturer

TADANO Ltd.
- Native name: 株式会社タダノ
- Type: Public KK
- Traded as: TYO: 6395
- Industry: Machinery
- Founded: Takamatsu, Kagawa (August 24, 1948; 77 years ago)
- Founder: Masuo Tadano
- Headquarters: Takamatsu, Kagawa, 761-0185, Japan,
- Area served: Worldwide
- Key people: Koichi Tadano (Chairman); Toshiaki Ujiie (President and CEO)
- Products: Construction cranes; Truck loader cranes; Aerial work platforms
- Revenue: ▲JPY 181.7 billion (FY 2013) (US$ 1.7 billion) (FY 2013)
- Net income: ▲JPY 14.4 billion (FY 2013) (US$ 139.9 million) (FY 2013)
- Number of employees: 3,227 (consolidated, as of March 31, 2014)
- Website: Official website

Tadano Ltd. (株式会社タダノ, Kabushiki-gaisha Tadano) (commonly known as Tadano) is the main and largest Japan-based manufacturer of cranes and aerial work platforms, considered one of largest crane manufacturers in the world.

== History ==
Masuo Tadano, the founder of the company, started as a steel fabricator in 1919 at Fujitsuka-cho, Takamatsu, Japan. In 1948, he founded TADANO Ltd. and set up the first manufacturing plant of cargo handling equipment, in the following years the company expanded manufacturing to include various industrial equipment. In 1955, Tadano introduced the first hydraulic truck crane with the capacity of 2 tonnage for the Japanese market. In 1960, Tadano successfully manufactured an export model of hydraulic truck crane and exported it to Indonesia.

From then, they have expanded into the worldwide market and established a solid international position in the field of hydraulic mobile cranes. From mid-term plan 2008, they are aiming to become the No.1 manufacturer of LE domain (LE means Lifting Equipment, machinery and equipment reflecting the concept of mobile, gravity-defying equipment for aerial work). In 1972, Tadano listed company's shares on the first section of the Tokyo Stock Exchange.

They are also known by the project to restore the Ahu Tongariki Moai Statues on Easter Island between 1992 and 1994.

TADANO has been accelerating its business worldwide since the early 2000s. Starting with the establishment of a Middle East office in Dubai (2003), it has acquired US-based crawler crane manufacturer SpanDeck Inc. in 2008 (now Tadano Mantis Corp.), in addition to the launch of production base for truck loader cranes in Thailand (2013).

In May 2013, it has announced the launch of ATF-400G series, the all terrain cranes with 400 metric tons of lifting capacity, which had been developed with its main subsidiary Tadano Faun.

In August 2013, TADANO announced the new model of rough terrain crane with the largest lifting weight for its kind (145 metric tons), targeting markets in the Americas and the Middle East.

In 2014 the company acquired its UK product distributor. The distributor company, Cranes UK, changed its name to Tadano UK. In August 2019 Tadano Ltd. completed its $215 million acquisition of the Demag Mobile Cranes business from Terex. This acquisition expanded the Tadano product line offering for All-Terrain Cranes as well as added a line of Lattice Boom Crawler cranes.

In December 2023, Tadano acquired a Japanese aerial platform manufacturer, Nagano Industry, for an undisclosed amount.

== Gallery ==
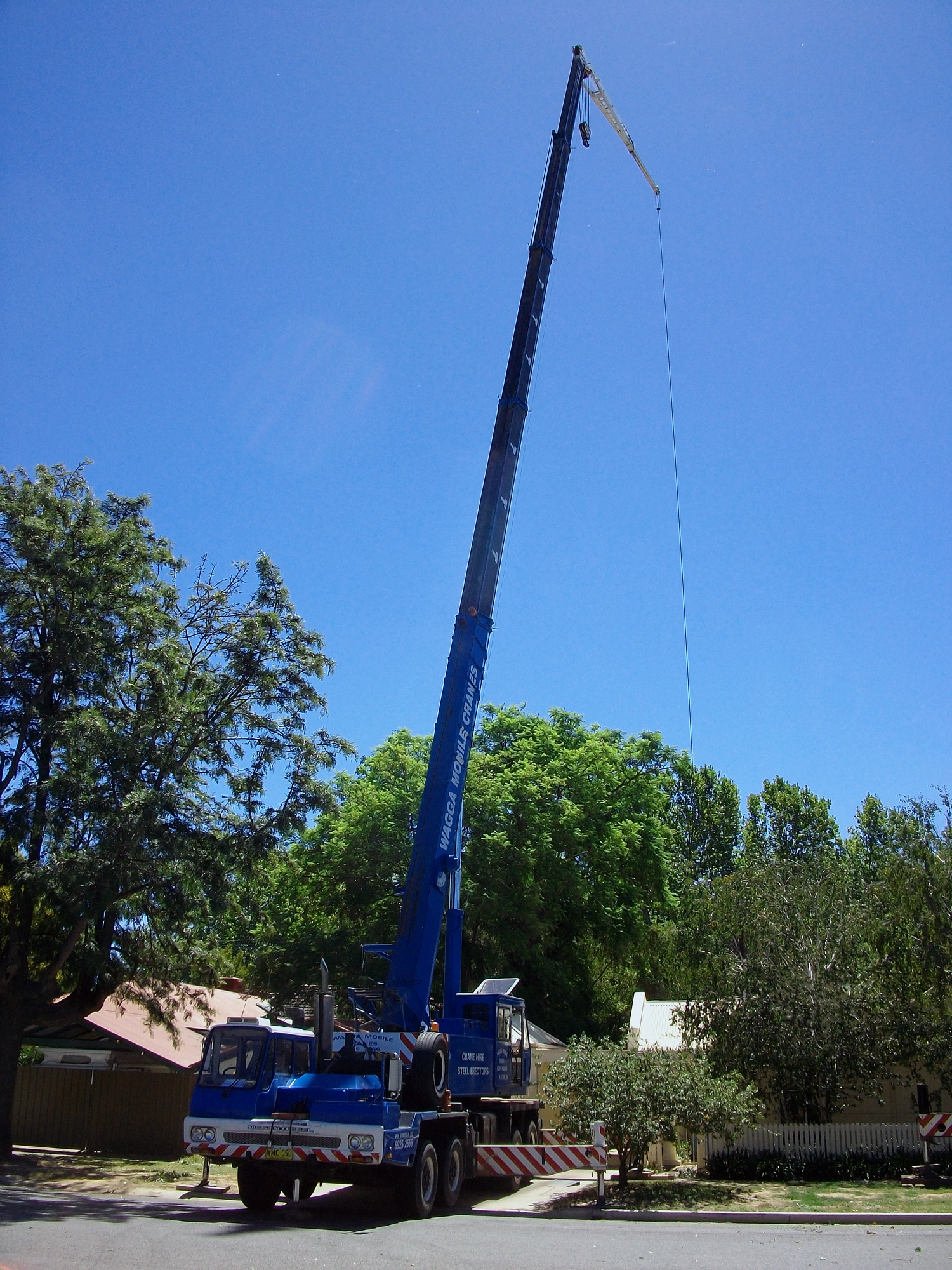
Nissan Diesel powered Tadano crane

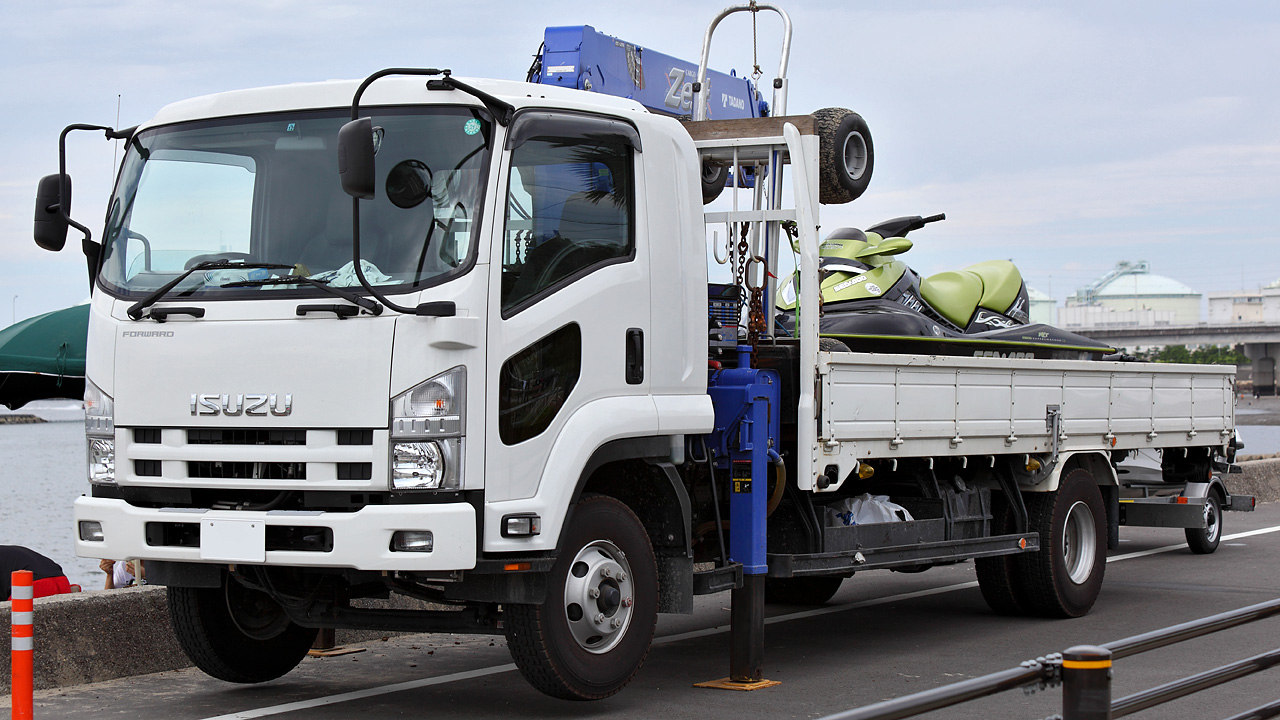
Tadano truck loader crane mounted on an Isuzu Forward

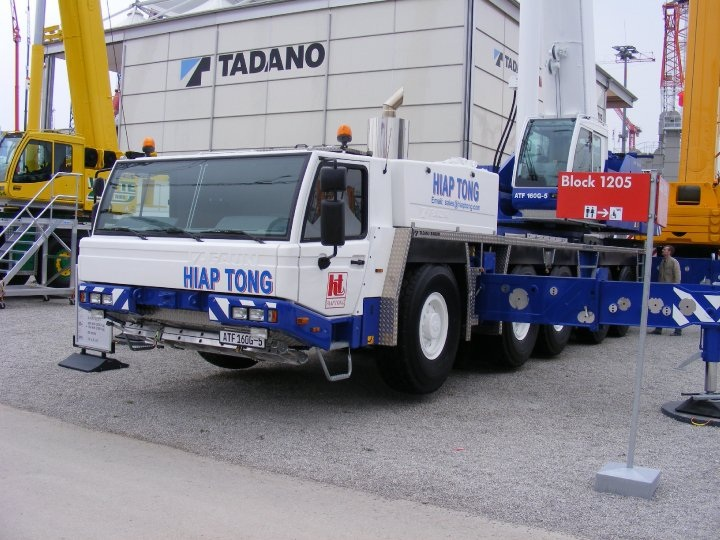
ATF series all terrain crane

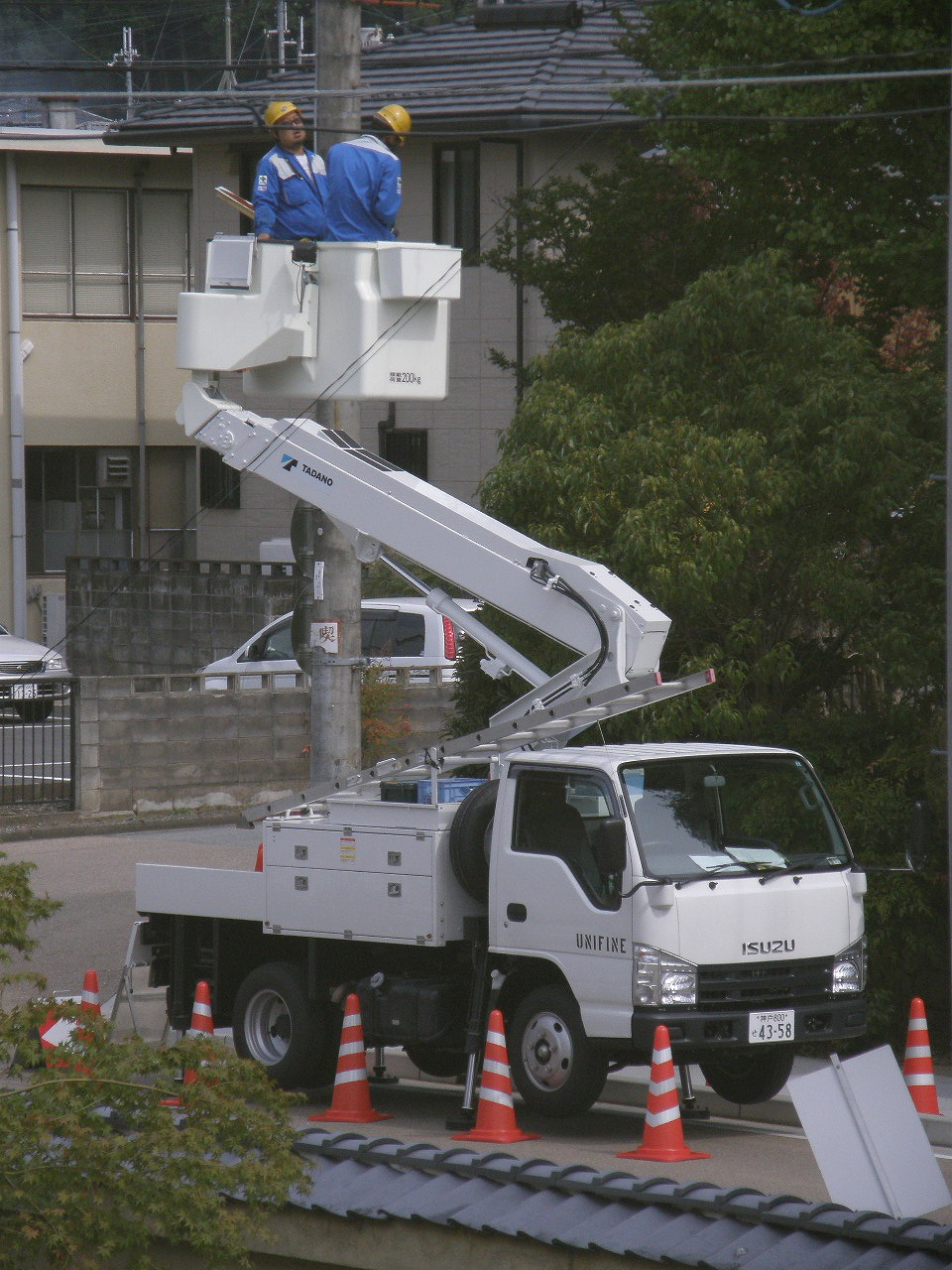
A Tadano aerial work platform

== See also ==
- Arabian Machinery and Heavy Equipment Company
