= Johns Hopkins Aramco Healthcare =

Johns Hopkins Aramco Healthcare JHAH

Geography
- Location: Dhahran, Eastern Province, Saudi Arabia

Organisation
- Care system: Epic System
- Type: Joint venture

Services
- Beds: 483

History
- Opened: 2013

Links
- Website: www.jhah.com

Johns Hopkins Aramco Healthcare is a joint project between Saudi Aramco, energy and integrated global petrochemicals company, and Johns Hopkins School of Medicine, the academic medical teaching and research arm of Johns Hopkins University. It is intended to provide healthcare for the employees of Saudi Aramco and their families. It is jointly owned by the company and the university.
