= Arasco =

Saudi Arabian food company

- An ARASCO facility
- Type: Joint stock company
- Industry: Food industry
- Founded: 1983; 43 years ago
- Headquarters: Riyadh, Saudi Arabia
- Area served: Saudi Arabia
- Products: Feed products, poultry products, food products, feed additives, raw materials, fertilizers, pesticides, veterinary medicines and vaccines, nutrition research, quality laboratories
- Number of employees: 3,000
- Website: www.arasco.com

Arabian Agricultural Services Company (ARASCO) is a large Saudi Arabian food company. It is one of the Gulf Cooperation Council’s (GCCs) most prominent national food companies, ranking among the 100 largest companies in Saudi Arabia.

It operates as a food security enterprise and the parent company of six strategic business units.

ARASCO is a private company working in the field of food supply, where it produces and enables others to produce food for humans and livestock, established in 1983 and owned by a group of Saudi shareholders and its main headquarter in the city of Riyadh and its factories and business sectors are distributed between the cities of Riyadh, Al-Kharj and Dammam.

== History ==
ARASCO began its business with a limited range of services and products to support the booming Saudi wheat sector at the time. In early 1987 the company made a strategic decision to expand its business and enter the feed sector and to raise the capital more than fourfold, in order to establish the first feed factory in the Kingdom in the region of Al Kharj with a production capacity of 30 tons per hour, and a storage capacity of 50 thousand tons, and then decided later to raise the production capacity of the plant by 80% to reach 54 tons per hour, then production was raised to 100 tons per hour. This was followed by the establishment of silos in The Port of King Abdulaziz Dammam with the aim of increasing the adequacy of the supply chain, and by the end of 1997, ARASCO became one of the largest producers of composite feed in the Middle East.

ARASCO later established and operated another feed factory with a production capacity of 150 tons/hour in Dammam city to support the output factory in order to contribute to cover the demand in the local market and nearby markets, making it the first of the complex feed manufacturers in Saudi Arabia and the region.

ARASCO has established more strategic business units serving its food supply chain to six units in the Kingdom. These units are (ARASCO Feed, ARASCO Food, Middle East Food Solutions Company (MEFSCO), Al-Emar International for Agrochemicals & Veterinary, IDAC Merieux and ARASCO Logistics).

The decision to acquire Al-Emar International for Agrochemicals & Veterinary Reconstruction Company in 1997 to provide services and advice to local farmers and provide agricultural and veterinary products and feed industry inputs to the poultry, dairy and livestock sectors was an important step in strengthening the company's capabilities and leading role in achieving food security support.

In the same year, the ARCHEM phosphate plant was established to serve the feed industry, which serves ARASCO and other companies in the region.

As well as ARASCO Food, which is one of the main producers of meaty chicken under the brand "entaj", which is marketed under the logo (Saudi chicken made right), where its production in 2020 reached about 250 thousand birds per day.

In 2014, ARASCO consolidated its position by concluding a strategic partnership agreement with Merieux NutriSciences, under which IDAC Merieux Laboratories was established, which serve many companies and factories in Saudi Arabia and the region.

ARASCO corn products, the only plant for corn products (starch, fructose and glucose) in Saudi Arabia and the Gulf region was in established in 2003, and then ARASCO signed a strategic alliance agreement with Cargill, which under this partnership restructured the corn products sector and in 2013 established the first joint venture of origin and derivatives from sweeteners in Saudi Arabia, under the name Middle East Food Solutions Company (MEFSCO).

ARASCO Logistics provides trucks or freight wagons on trains.

Since 2013, Bahri Bulk Cargo Transport Company (a joint venture between ARASCO and Al-Bahri) has operated five ships, while the maritime fleet is planned to increase the fleet within this partnership to 20 ships in the future.

== See also ==
- List of companies of Saudi Arabia
