= Sahara Net =

- Native name: صحارى نت
- Formerly: Sahara Net
- Company type: JSC
- Founders: Kais Al-Essa & Haitham Bu-Aisha
- Headquarters: Dammam, Saudi Arabia
- Key people: Haitham Bu-Aisha (CEO)
- Number of employees: 500+ (2023)
- Website: http://www.sahara.com

Sahara Net is an information and communications technology provider (ICT) serving the Saudi market, the company has rapidly grown since 1989 to offer various complementary services such as connectivity, internet, hosting, cloud, optimization, cyber security, and managed services.

== History ==
Sahara Net is a Saudi Joint Stock Company (JSC) and its history goes back to 1989 when Sahara Net established the 1st Saudi Bulletin Board Service (BBS) in the Kingdom. During this period, it operated as a hub for email exchange in the FidoNet network. And in 1994 Sahara Net started offering Internet connectivity and other related services like internet email, web design, web hosting, and Domain name registry services. These services made the first ISP in Saudi Arabia before the official licensing in 1998, when the Saudi Internet market was regulated and Sahara Net received Internet Service Provider (ISP) license and was appointed as the official Local Internet Registry (LIR) in the Kingdom of Saudi Arabia.

== Today ==
The company grew over these years to become one of the main ICTs in the Saudi Arabian market, extending network coverage to all major cities in Saudi Arabia, and offering various connectivity options to business as well as home users. In 2009, the company was partially acquired by Telindus (the ICT investment arm of Belgacom), the famous telecom operator in Belgium and Europe. Then, in 2014, the company was fully acquired by its original founders. Recently, Sahara Net was converted from an LLC to a JSC with over 1200 shareholders by a capital raise (original founders still control 70% of the shares).

== Official Website ==
- Official website
