= Vela International Marine =

Saudi Arabian oil tanker company

Vela International Marine Limited
- Native name: Arabic: فيلا
- Founded: 1984; 41 years ago
- Headquarters: Armada Towers, Dubai, United Arab Emirates
- Parent: Bahri

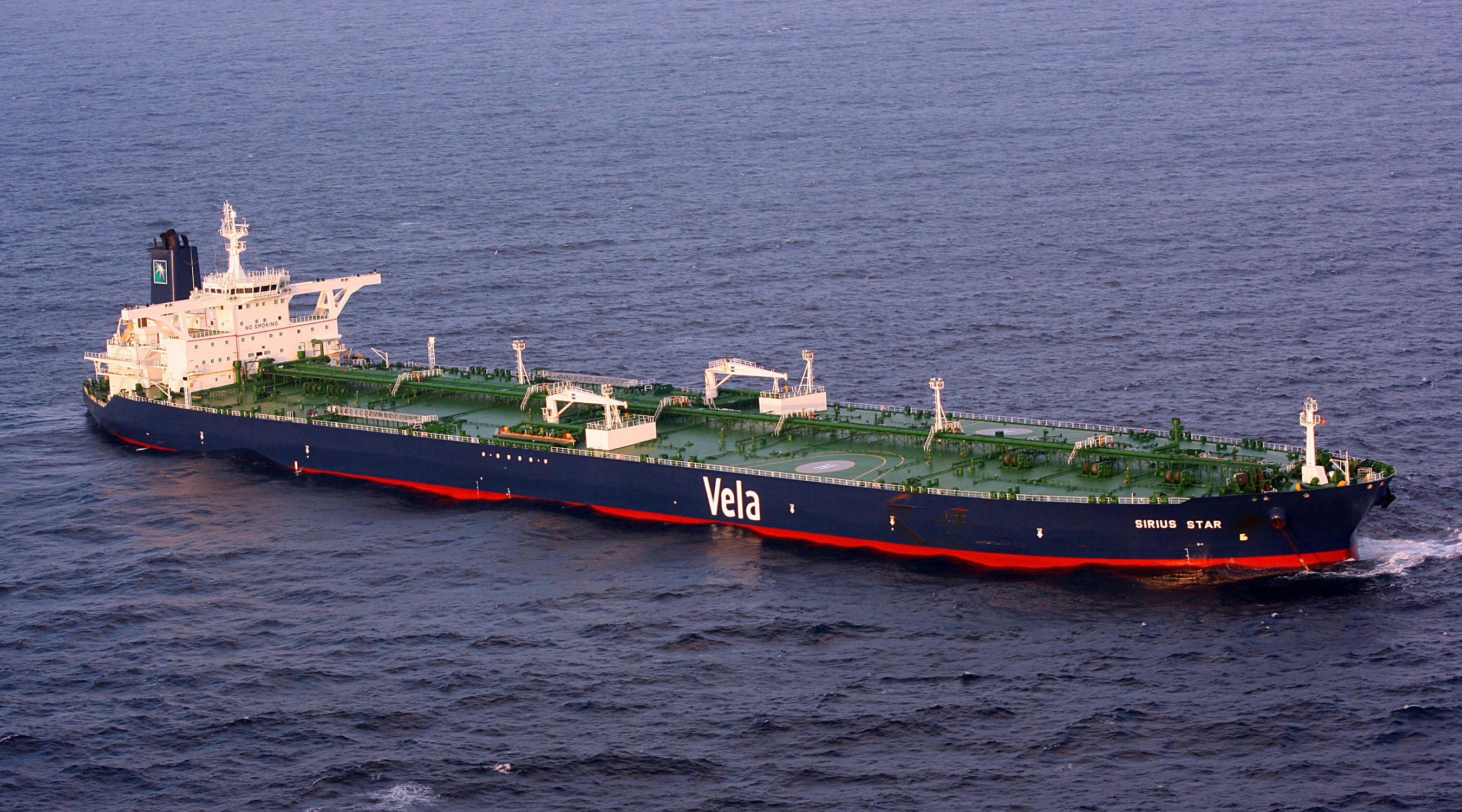
Sirius Star

Vela International Marine Limited (Arabic: فيلا) is a Bahri-owned company. Vela, established in 1984, currently owns 29 oil tankers most of which are very large crude carriers (VLCCs).

Vela International Marine's ship the MV Sirius Star was hijacked by Somali pirates on 15 November 2008 and released 9 January 2009 after a $3 million ransom was paid.

Vela was owned by Saudi Aramco but was sold to Bahri for $1.3 billion 2012.

== The Vela Fleet ==
The current fleet consists of:

- Albutain Star --319,500 DWT
- Aldebaran Star --97,000 DWT
- Almizan Star --319,500 DWT
- Alnasl Star --49,000 DWT
- Altair Star --49,000 DWT
- Alphard Star-- 301,800 DWT
- Altarf Star --49,000 DWT
- Antares Star --319,400 DWT
- Aries Star -- 317,000 DWT
- Capricorn Star -- 317,000 DWT
- Gemini Star-- 301,800 DWT
- Homan Star--
- Janah Star --319,500 DWT
- Leo Star -- 317,000 DWT
- Markab Star --301,500 DWT
- Mirfak Star-- 301,500 DWT
- Perkhad Star --301,500 DWT
- Phoenix Star--291,400 DWT
- Pisces Star -- 317,000 DWT
- Polaris Star --301,500 DWT
- Saiph Star --318,000 DWT
- Serius Star --319,500 DWT
- Shaula Star-- 301,500 DWT
- Manifa -- 318,000 DWT.
- Suhail Star-- 301,800 DWT
- Vega Star --319,500 DWT
- Virgo Star --
- Zaurak Star --49,000 DWT

Vela International Marine Limited is ranked the sixth largest VLCC owner in the world:

- 1,100 Employees Worldwide.
- 1,000 Voyages/Year.
- Own & Operate 26 Tankers.
- 22 VLCC Vessels: 2.1 MM BBL/Voyage.
- One Aframax Tanker: 0.6 MM BBL/Voyage.
- Four Medium Rang Tankers: 0.3 MM BBL/Voyage.
- Vela Transports 3 MM BBL/Day, 83% Internationally, 17% Domestically.
