= Qaym =

Arabic language review application

- Type: Private
- Industry: Business ratings and reviews
- Founded: Jan 2006
- Headquarters: Riyadh, Saudi Arabia
- Key people: Jihad Alammar, Founder/CEO, Ziyad Alghannam, Co-Founder
- Products: qaym.com
- Number of employees: 7+
- Website: www.qaym.com

Qaym is an Arabic-language review site specialized at user-based reviews on restaurants around the world. It started as a review site mainly for restaurants in the Arabian region. The website runs a social networking, user review, and local search using the second generation of web Web 2.0. The website is aimed to deliver good restaurant reviews and easy access contents for Arab readers.

== History ==
- 2007: Qaym started as beta version. The beta version was a basic prototype to test the system's performance by selected professional users and normal internet users.
- 2008: By early 2008 Qaym was officially released to the public.
- 2009: Qaym joined Badir-ICT, a technology incubator in Saudi Arabia.
- 2011: In March 2011, Qaym raised a round of funding from N2V, a top MENA Venture Capital firm.

=== API ===
- 2009: Qaym released a free application programming interface (API) V.1.0 in April 2009. The API provides access to business listing details, reviews, photos, and ratings to a website, widget, or mobile application. The API has been used to integrate business reviews into existing Google Maps applications.

== Applications ==
- Sep 02, 2011: Qaym launched its first Qaym iPhone official app on the Apple Apps-Store.
- July 28, 2011: Ahmad Salman, a web developer has created Qaym-API-Class Resources that employs PHP and API for web and mobile applications.
- Aug 26, 2011: Ahmad Salman, a web developer has launched QaymRoulette.
- Aug 17, 2010: A group of Android developers have launched an Restriod which is an Android Application.

== Publicity ==
- Qaym was mentioned on Saudi local newspapers such as Al Riyadh and Al Eqtisadiah in April 2009. Several remarks was mentioned about Qaym such as that it is one of its kind in Saudi Arabia.
- In 2010, Bloggers and editors compared Qaym to Yelp, Inc. as the "Yelp for the Arab word".

== April Fools ==
On April 1, 2009, Qaym has featured an April Fools prank on the site. The site was totally revamped as if its going to be Camels reviewing social network.
