= Nama Chemicals =

Saudi Arabian chemical company

Nama Chemicals نماء للكيماويات
- Company type: Private
- Industry: Petrochemical industry
- Founded: May 12, 1992; 34 years ago
- Headquarters: Jubail, Saudi Arabia
- Products: Epoxy, Caustic Soda, Epichlorohydrin, Calcium Chloride, Hydrochloric Acid and Sodium hypochlorite
- Website: http://www.nama.com.sa/

Nama Chemicals, also known as NAMA, is a Saudi Arabian joint stock Taduwal listed company established in 1992 with the objective of developing and establishing industrial projects particularly in the area of chemicals and petrochemicals.

== History ==
Nama Chemicals was established as a local chemicals company in Jubail, Saudi Arabia in 1992. The city lays along the Persian Gulf on the eastern coast of Saudi Arabia and since the establishment of the company, has grown to become a major industrial city.

NAMA was part of a consortium of private companies to bid for a development contract for which was to become Saudi Arabia's first privately owned refinery in 2011, but lost the bid to the state oil company Saudi Aramco.

In 2014, NAMA finished the expansion of its largest epoxy resins plant, raising the production capacity from 60,000 to 120,000 tons of epoxy per year. The construction contract, valued at around $116 million, had been awarded to Jacobs Engineering Group in 2011. Trial runs at the expanded plant were started in October 2013 with commercial operations fully commencing in April 2014.

== Corporate structure ==
=== Management ===
Saud Abdul Aziz Al Gosaibi, a Saudi businessman, is the chairman of the company. Fahad Al Otaibi is the company president. Other board members include Khalifa Al-Mulhem, Mohammed Al-Bahar, Khalid Al-Rawaf, and Sultan K. Al-Turki.

Kamal Mohammed Fatayerji is NAMA's CEO and Faisal Al Tutairi is the companies current Vice President of Administration and Industrial Services.

=== Affiliates ===
NAMA Europe, located in Bern, Switzerland, NAMA Germany, NAMA Industrial Investment, Arabian Alkali Company (SODA) and Jubail Chemical Industries Company (JANA) are affiliate companies of NAMA.

=== Shareholders and finance ===
From 2003 to 2008, NAMA's sales increased by 400% to $170 million.

In 2017, NAMA announced a recovery plan after having made losses in previous quarters. During the downturn of the ME stock market in the same year, NAMA was one of the two of 14 petrochemical companies to not loose points, but instead increased by 9.1%.

In 2006 Nama Chemicals was listed as one of the Saudi Arabia's top 100 companies.

=== Operations ===
The company manufactures and markets epoxy, epichlorohydrin, caustic soda, chlorine, hydrochloric acid, sodium hypochlorite and calcium chloride to the worldwide market.

Revenue from their sales of epoxy form the core of the company activities with a worldwide market share of 6%.
