= Lucidya =

Customer experience management platform

- Type: Private
- Industry: Customer experience management (CXM)
- Founded: August 18, 2016; 10 years ago
- Founders: Abdullah Asiri, Hatem Kameli, Mohamed Milyani, Zuhair Khayyat
- Headquarters: Riyadh, Saudi Arabia
- Number of locations: 2
- Area served: GCC region (11 countries)
- Key people: Abdullah Asiri (CEO)
- Website: lucidya.com

Lucidya is a unified customer experience management (CXM) platform that uses artificial intelligence to provide real-time insights and interactions for organizations. Founded on August 18, 2016, in Jeddah, Saudi Arabia, the company focuses on serving enterprises, governments, and SMEs in the Arab world.

== History ==
Lucidya was founded in 2016 by Abdullah Asiri, Hatem Kameli, Mohamed Milyani, and Zuhair Khayyat. In 2017, the company launched its first AI-powered product for Twitter listening. This was followed by the introduction of a social listening platform in 2018.

In 2019, Lucidya was listed among the Arab startups shaping the Fourth Industrial Revolution on the World Economic Forum. That same year, it became the first venture capital-backed AI company in the MENA region.

Lucidya secured $1.1 million in seed funding in January 2019 from investors such as VentureSouq, SEEDRA Ventures, and the Saudi Venture Capital Company. In January 2022, the company raised $6 million in a Series A funding round led by Rua Growth Fund, with participation from M.A.L Ventures and AlRashed Group.

In 2021, the company introduced the Lucidya CXM platform. The following year, Lucidya launched two new products: Profiles, an AI-powered customer data platform, and Survey, a feedback analysis tool.

In 2023, Lucidya unveiled Luci, an AI-powered virtual analyst designed to provide insights and recommendations based on customer interactions.

In 2024, the company introduced OmniServe, a platform for managing brand interactions.

In April 2025, Lucidya received a SAR 5 million (approximately US$1.3 million) grant from Saudi Arabia's National Technology Development Program.

In July 2025, Lucidya closed a US$30 million Series B funding round led by Impact46, with participation from Wa'ed Ventures (Aramco's venture arm), Takamol Ventures, SparkLabs Group, Rua Growth Fund, and ARG.

== Overview ==
Lucidya offers a unified CXM platform that integrates various tools for managing customer experiences. The platform uses artificial intelligence to provide real-time insights and engagement for organizations. Lucidya serves enterprises, governments, and SMEs in 11 countries in the Arab world, primarily focusing on customers in Saudi Arabia and the GCC region.

Features include Arabic language analysis (the platform provides sentiment analysis with 92% accuracy across 15 Arabic dialects), real-time engagement (tools for identifying, reaching, and engaging customers in real-time), AI-driven insights (deep analytics for optimizing customer experiences and reducing operational costs), and privacy compliance (adhering to global and regional data privacy regulations, including GDPR, SOC2, and Saudi Arabia's personal data protection law).

== Operations ==
Lucidya's headquarters are in Riyadh, Saudi Arabia, with an additional office in Jeddah. The company employs over 150 people. The company adopted a four-day workweek. Abdullah Asiri is founder and CEO of the company and Zuhair Khayyat is co-founder and CTO.

Lucidya has earned several accolades, including the Great Place to Work Certification (2023), LinkedIn's #1 Saudi Startup (2023), G2 High Performer (2021, 2022, 2023), G2 Leader (2023), Capterra's Best Ease of Use (2021), and Crozdesk Quality Choice, Trusted Vendor, and Happiest Users (2023).
