= Saudi Advanced Industries Company =

Saudi Advanced Industries Company (SAIC) الشركة السعودية للصناعات المتطورة
- Company type: Public
- ISIN: SA0007879246
- Founded: 1987
- Headquarters: Riyadh, Saudi Arabia
- Key people: Abdullah Muhammad Al-Humaidhi (Chairman); Abdullah Suleiman Al-Juraish (Managing Director); Abdulrahman Nasser Al-Obaid (Vice Chairman)
- Revenue: 44,456,000 Saudi riyal (2019)
- Total assets: 811,027,000 Saudi riyal (2019)
- Website: http://www.saic.com.sa

Saudi Advanced Industries Company is an industrial investment vehicle of the U.S. Peace Shield defense offset program. The company was formed in 1987, and invests in technology companies in Saudi Arabia. It also holds interests in AlSalam Aircraft Company and the Aircraft Accessories & Components Company, both in Saudi Arabia.

== Activity ==
Transfer of advanced technology to the Kingdom through participation in the Economic Balance Program and other industrial projects. The company is currently investing in the following projects: Al-Salam Aircraft Company Limited, Arab Industrial Fibers Company (Ibn Rushd), Manufacturing and Energy Services Company, National Petrochemical Company (Yansab), Obeikan Glass Company, and Deutsche Gulf Finance Company.
