= Bahri (company) =

National shipping carrier of Saudi Arabia

The National Shipping Company of Saudi Arabia (Bahri) الشركة الوطنية السعودية للنقل البحري
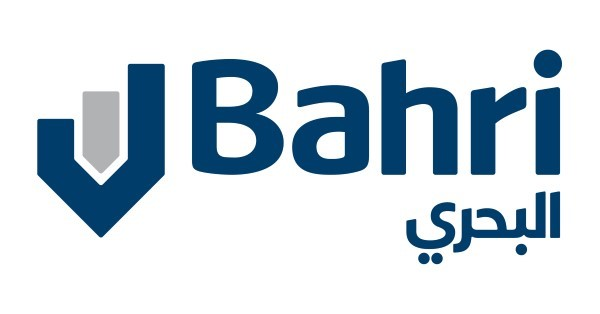

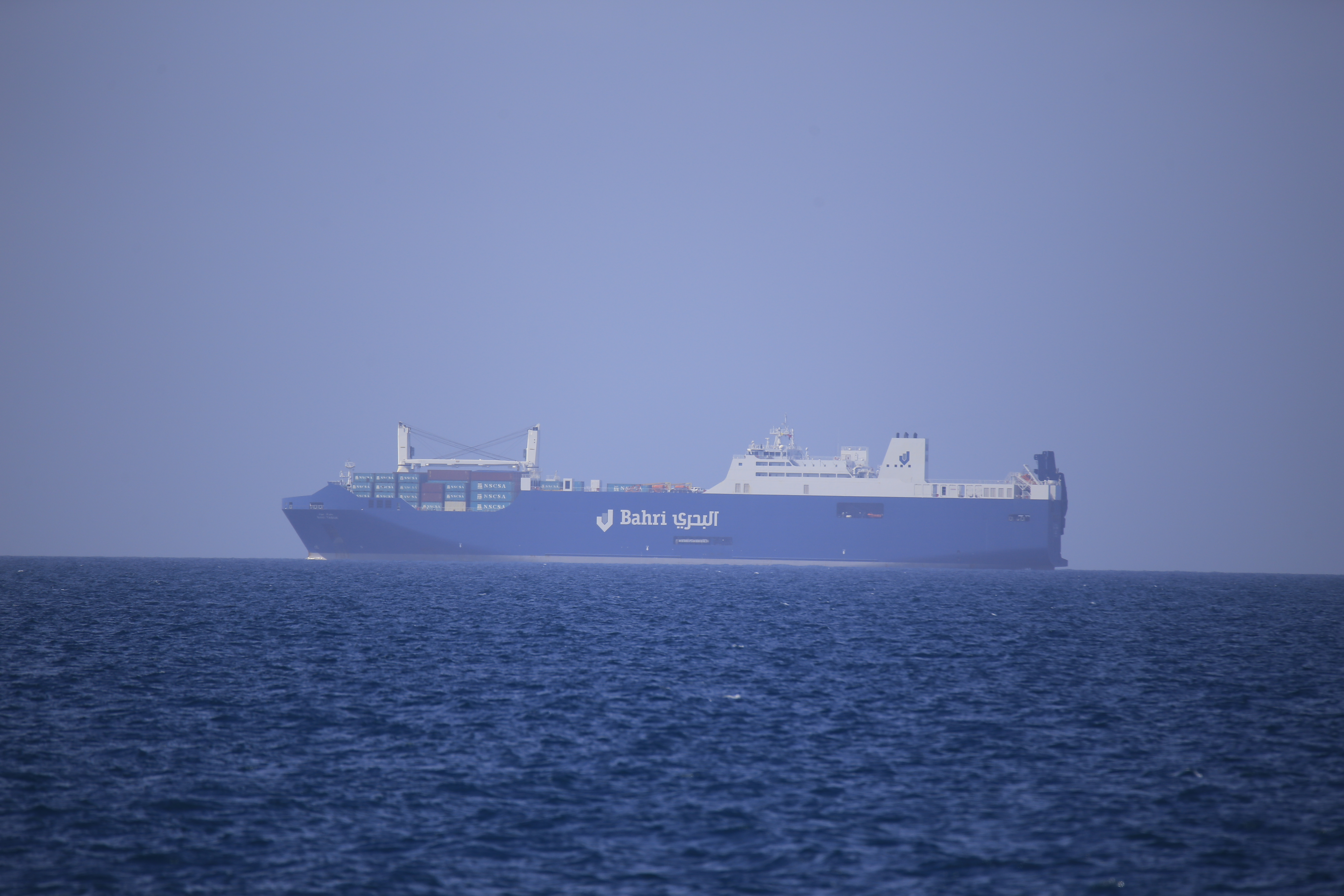
- Company type: Public
- ISIN: SA0007870054
- Founded: January 22, 1978; 48 years ago
- Founder: Royal Decree
- Headquarters: Riyadh, Saudi Arabia
- Key people: Mohammed AlSarhan; Fahad Al Saif; Ahmed Al-Subaey (CEO)
- Services: Transportation of Oil, Chemicals, dry-bulk, Multi Purpose Cargo, Ship Management and Bahri Marine
- Revenue: 9.48 billion Saudi riyal (2024)
- Total assets: 22,898,097 Saudi riyal (2022)
- Owner: Public Investment Fund (22.55%); Saudi Aramco Development Co. (20%)
- Number of employees: Approximately 4000
- Divisions: Oil, Chemicals, Logistics, Dry-bulk, and Ship Management and Bahri Marine
- Website: http://www.bahri.sa

Bahri, formerly known as the National Shipping Company of Saudi Arabia, is a transportation and logistics company, positioned as the national shipping carrier of Saudi Arabia.

== Overview ==
The company structures its operations around five business units that include Oil, Chemicals, Logistics, Dry Bulk, and Ship Management. Bahri's service offering includes transportation of crude oil, oil products, chemical, bulk cargo, Roll-on/roll-off as well as ship management and Bahri marine.

Today, Bahri one of the largest owner and operator of Very Large Crude Carriers (VLCCs) in the world, and one of the owner of chemical tanker ships in the Middle East.^{[1]} The company currently owns 97 vessels with more on order, including 50 VLCCs, 31 chemical/product tankers, 7 multipurpose vessels and 13 dry bulk carriers.^{[2]}

== History ==
The National Shipping Company of Saudi Arabia was created by a Royal Decree as a public company in 1978, with 22% ownership stake held by the Public Investment Fund (PIF) of the Saudi government, 20% by Saudi Aramco Development Company (SADCO), and the remaining shares listed on the Saudi stock exchange (Tadawul).

== Business Units ==
Bahri Oil - Bahri Oil was established in 1996 to serve the crude oil transportation needs of Saudi Arabia and other oil-producing countries in the region. Presently, Bahri Oil commercially manages a total of 47 VLCCs.

Bahri Chemicals - Bahri Chemicals is one of the chemical/product tanker owner and operator in the Middle East. Established in 1990, Bahri Chemicals’ fleet consists of 31 chemical/product tankers with a fleet capacity of 1.682 million DWT.

Bahri Logistics - Founded in 1979, Bahri Logistics was the first strategic business unit to be created within Bahri. Bringing a novel approach to its focus on optimal cargo mix, Bahri Logistics operates a total of 7 state-of-the-art multipurpose vessels on a regular liner schedule.

Bahri Dry Bulk - Bahri Dry Bulk was set up in 2010 as a joint venture (JV) between Bahri and Arabian Agricultural Services Company (ARASCO), with a mandate to acquire, own, charter and commercially operate a fleet of dry bulk vessels. The JV paved the way for Bahri's diversification into dry bulk transportation, which represents about 23% of the total cargo imported to Saudi Arabia.

Bahri Ship Management - Bahri Ship Management was established in the year 1996 jointly by Bahri and Acomarit, a ship management company based in Scotland, to provide ship management services to companies across the region. Based in Dubai, the company presently manages 97ships comprising VLCCs, chemical carriers, and dry bulk ships.

Bahri Roll-on/roll-off - Cars, machineries and mafi roll trailers sea carriage and shipping division.

Floating Water Desalination Barges - Bahri expands business with SWCC through a 20-year agreement, establishing three floating desalination barges. These barges process 150,000 cubic meters of seawater per day using treatment processes like reverse osmosis, remineralization, and integrated ultrafiltration.

== See also ==
- List of largest container shipping companies
- Nippon Yusen Kaisha
- American Roll-on Roll-off Carrier
- Toyofuji Shipping
- Messina Line
