= Petro Rabigh =

Petrochemical company of Saudi Arabia

Coordinates: 22°42′35″N 39°1′19″E

Petro Rabigh بترو رابغ
- Trade name: TADAWUL:2380
- Company type: Public
- Traded as: Saudi Exchange
- ISIN: SA120GAH5617
- Industry: Petrochemical
- Founded: 2005
- Founder: Saudi Aramco; Sumitomo Chemical
- Headquarters: , Rabigh, Saudi Arabia
- Key people: Othman A. Al-Ghamdi (President and CEO); Ibrahim Q. Al-Buainain (Chairman)
- Revenue: $10.2 billion USD (2024)
- Total assets: 16,140,000,000 United States dollar (2024)
- Website: http://www.petrorabigh.com

Rabigh Refining & Petrochemical Company (Petro Rabigh) is a Saudi Arabian– petrochemical company. Founded in 2005 as a joint venture between Saudi Aramco and Sumitomo Chemical, it produces and markets refined hydrocarbon and petrochemicals. It is considered the first producer of many petrochemical products and the only producer of propylene oxide in the Middle East.

Petro Rabigh products are used in plastics, detergents, lubricants, resins, coolants, anti-freeze, paint, carpets, rope, clothing, shampoo, auto interiors, epoxy glue, insulation, film, fibers, household appliances, packaging, candles, pipes and many other applications.

Petro Rabigh II is an expansion project valued at US$9 billion that reached full production by 4th Quarter 2017 and provided a wide range of new high value-added products, some of which are exclusive to the Kingdom of Saudi Arabia and the Middle East.

It is a site next to Petro Rabigh where downstream industries utilize Petro Rabigh products as feedstock to produce chemical compounds such as polyols, polymer stabilizers, xylenes and solvents. The Rabigh Plastic Technical Center (R-PTC), a facility run by Sumitomo Chemical, provides technical support and training in plastic processing technology.

In December 2020, the boards of directors appointed Othman Ali Al-Ghamdi as a board member and CEO, effective from Jan. 1, 2021, after the resignation of the CEO Nasser Damsheq Al-Mahasher.
