= SABIC =

Saudi chemicals company

- Trade name: SABIC
- Native name: الشركة السعودية للصناعات الأساسية (سابك)
- Type: Public
- Traded as: Tadawul: 2010
- ISIN: SA0007879121
- Industry: Chemicals
- Founded: September 1976; 50 years ago
- Headquarters: Riyadh, Saudi Arabia
- Key people: Khalid Hashim Al-Dabbagh (Chairman); Faisal Mohammed Alfaqeer (CEO)
- Products: Chemicals and intermediates, industrial polymers and fertilizers
- Revenue: ▲US$52.92 billion (2022)
- Operating income: ▼US$6.37 billion (2022)
- Net income: ▼US$4.41 billion (2022)
- Total assets: ▼US$83.49 billion (2022)
- Total equity: ▲US$49.61 billion (2022)
- Owner: Saudi Aramco (70%)
- Number of employees: 32,721 (2019)
- Website: www.sabic.com

Saudi Basic Industries Corporation (Arabic: الشركة السعودية للصناعات الأساسية), known as SABIC (Arabic: سابك (Note: The official logo displays an alternative calligraphy Arabic: سابكـ which is different from the standard Naskh calligraphy Arabic: سابك.)), is a Saudi chemical manufacturing company. 70% of SABIC's shares are owned by Saudi Aramco. It is active in petrochemicals, chemicals, industrial polymers and fertilizers. It is the second largest public company in the Middle East and Saudi Arabia as listed in Tadawul.

In 2017, SABIC was ranked fourth in the world among chemical companies by Fortune Global 500. By the end of 2018 SABIC was the world's 281st-largest corporation. In 2014, the company had sales revenues of $50.4 billion, profits of $6.7 billion and assets standing at $90.4 billion. It also has been recognized as the world's second most valuable brand in the chemicals industry by Brand Finance in 2021.

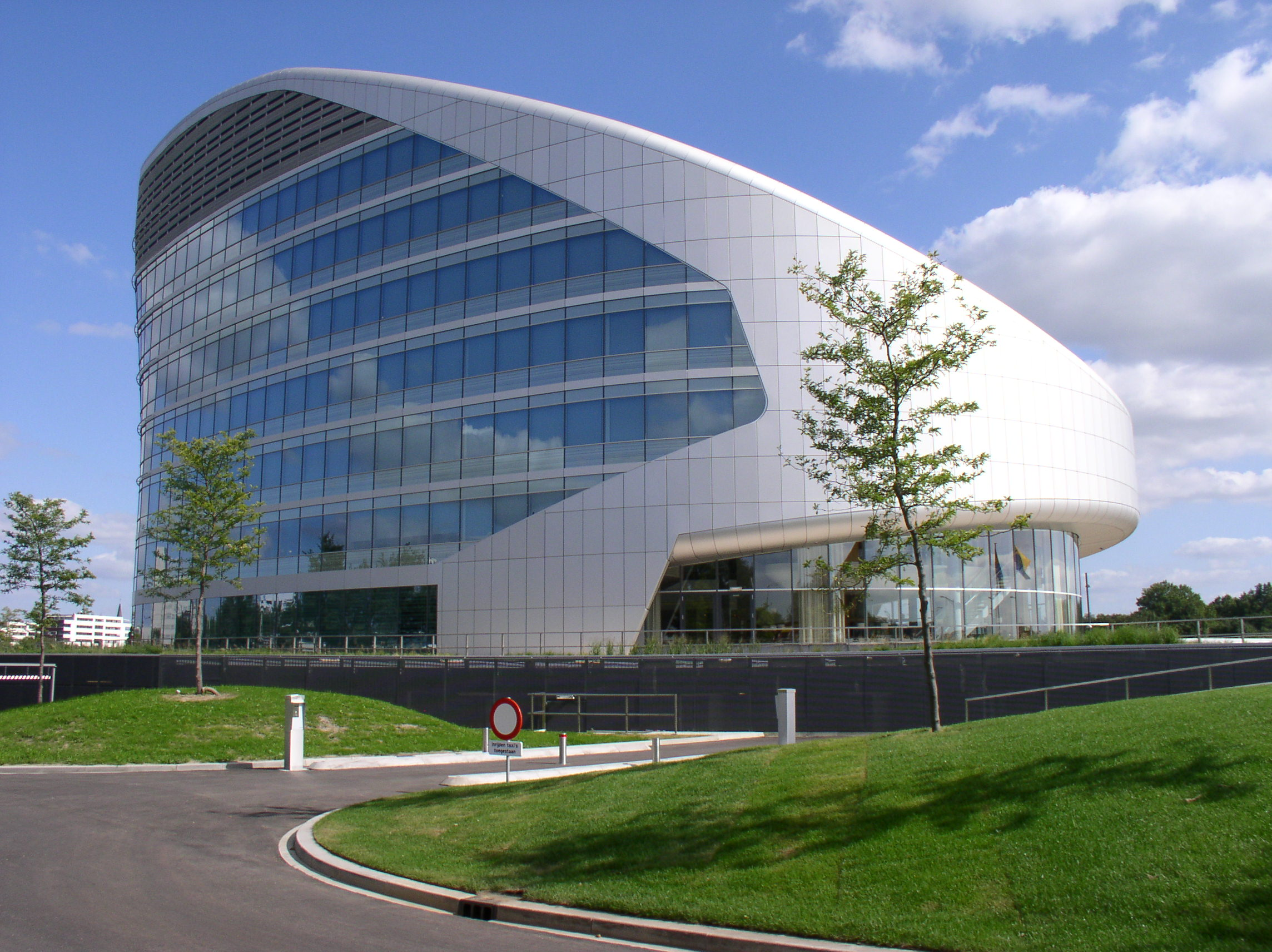
SABIC's former European Head Office in Sittard, the Netherlands

== History ==
SABIC was founded in 1976 by royal decree to convert oil by-products into useful chemicals, polymers, and fertilizers. The first chairman of the company was Ghazi Abdul Rahman Al Gosaibi, the Minister of Industry and Electricity, and the first CEO was Abdulaziz bin Abdullah Al Zamil.

SABIC's founding transformed the small fishing villages of Jubail on the Persian Gulf and Yanbu on the Red Sea into modern industrial cities. Production in 1985 was 6.5 million tonnes; five years later production rose to 13 million tonnes and by 2003 production had risen to 42 million tonnes and by 2012 to over 60 million tonnes. SABIC employs more than 40,000 people globally and has 60 manufacturing and compounding plants in over 40 countries.

SABIC's manufacturing network in Saudi Arabia consists of 18 affiliates. Most of these are based in the Al-Jubail Industrial City on the coast of the Persian Gulf. Two are located in Yanbu Industrial City on the Red Sea and one is in the eastern city of Dammam. SABIC also partners in three regional ventures based in Bahrain. SABIC is a market leader in key products such as ethylene, ethylene glycol, methanol, MTBE and polyethylene.

== Operations ==
SABIC underwent a business restructuring in October 2015, that saw the absorption of the commodity chemicals produced under the Innovative Plastics SBU into the Chemicals and Polymers SBUs. Along with this, the Specialties SBU was created to house the remainder of the Innovative Plastics products that did not fall under the commodity umbrella and the Innovative Plastics SBU would cease to exist by January 1, 2016. This change follows the reallocation of the Performance Chemicals portfolio into the Chemicals SBU.

In July 2002, SABIC commenced operations in Europe after the $2 billion acquisition of the petrochemicals business of Dutch group DSM. SABIC Europe, SABIC's European subsidiary, produces over 2 million tonnes of polymers and over 5 million tonnes of basic chemicals. It employs over 3,000 people and has two major manufacturing locations in Geleen in the Netherlands and Gelsenkirchen in Germany. After forming SABIC Europe, SABIC became the 11th-largest petrochemicals company in the world. The purchase of DSM signified SABIC's intent to expand and become a true global company.

In 2004, the value of SABIC shares, listed on the Saudi Stock Exchange (Tadawul), increased 170% while its net profits increased by 112% from 2003 to 2004.

In 2005, SABIC was the Middle East's largest (in terms of market capitalization) and most profitable publicly listed non-oil company, the world's 11th-largest petrochemical company, ranked 331 on the Fortune Global 500 for 2005, the second-largest producer of ethylene glycol and methanol in the world, the third-largest producer of polyethylene and overall the fourth-largest producer of polypropylene and polyolefin. Standard & Poor's and Fitch Ratings claimed SABIC to be the world's largest producer of polymers and the Persian Gulf region's largest steel producer for 2005; they assigned SABIC an "A" corporate credit rating. That same year, Bloomberg ranked SABIC as the 13th-largest company in the world in terms of market capitalization (at the beginning of 2005 it exceeded ر.س 375 billion, the equivalent of US$100 billion) and the second-largest by market value outside the US and UK.

In June 2006, SABIC established the "SABIC Sukuk Company" to issue Islamic bonds (Sukuk) that are estimated to range between ر.س 1 billion (US$266.67 million) and ر.س 3 billion (US$800 million).

In January 2007, SABIC Europe took over Huntsman Corporation plants in the UK. Headquartered in Sittard, Netherlands, SABIC Europe has a European wide network of sales offices and logistic hubs, as well as three petrochemical production sites in Europe: Geleen (Netherlands), Teesside (United Kingdom), and Gelsenkirchen (Germany).

In 2008, SABIC Europe produced 7.3 million metric tons of petrochemicals, mainly for the European market.

On May 21, 2007, SABIC acquired General Electric's Plastics division, in a US$11.6 billion cash deal, including US$8.7 billion of its liabilities, and launched SABIC Innovative Plastics. In that year, the company ranked 145 (previous rank: 301) in the Forbes Global 2000 list. As of 2014, SABIC Innovative Plastics is a multibillion-dollar company with operations in more than 25 countries and over 9,500 employees worldwide.

In July 2009, SABIC received approval from the Chinese government to build a US$3 billion petrochemical complex in China, in order to gain a foothold in the world's fastest-growing chemicals market.

In January 2018, SABIC announced that it had acquired a 24.99% stake in Clariant, the Swiss specialty chemical manufacturer. The stake was acquired from activist investor White Tale, and at Clariant's prevailing market-capitalisation would have been valued in the region of $2.4bn. The actual transaction price was undisclosed. SABIC CEO Yousef Al-Benyan had previously stated, in November 2017, that the company was looking to spend $3bn-$10bn on acquisitions over the next 10 years.

On March 27, 2019, SABIC announced that state-owned energy company Saudi Aramco signed a share purchase agreement to acquire a 70% majority stake in SABIC from the Public Investment Fund of Saudi Arabia in a private transaction worth $69.1 billion. The transaction was completed in June 2020.

SABIC moved its European headquarters from Sittard to Amsterdam in 2024.

== Production and major expansions ==
Expansion operations and investments supposedly amounted to US$20 billion in 2007 and US$70 billion until 2020. The overall total production in 1985 was 6.3 million metric tons; by the end of 2008 it had reached 56 million metric tons. SABIC supposedly can produce over 135 million metric tons per year.

== Financial performance ==
Net profits of SABIC in 2008 touched ر.س 22 billion (US$5.86 billion), while total assets stood at ر.س 272 billion (US$72.5 billion) at the end of 2008 and the value of current assets at the end of 2008 stood at ر.س 95 billion (US$25 billion). The Fortune 500 ranking set SABIC revenues as of $40.2 billion.

SABIC reported preliminary consolidated financial results for the period ended September 30, 2010. Net income for the third quarter of 2010 was ر.س 5.33 billion, compared to net income of ر.س 3.65 billion in the same period the previous year, representing an increase of 46% and compared to ر.س 5.02 billion for the previous quarter, a rise of 6%.

According to the 2019 Fortune Global 500 list, SABIC reported $45.1 billion in revenues and $5.7 billion in profits for the 2018-2019 FY, ranking it in fourth place among chemical companies and #252 in the list. It was ranked 14th on Forbes Middle East's Top 100 Listed Companies 2025 list.

== Subsidiaries ==
- Ibn Sina
- Saudi-European Petrochemical Company (Ibn Zahr)
- Saudi Carbon Fiber Company
- Saudi Petrochemical Company (Sadaf)
- National Industrial Gases Co (Gas)
- Petrokemya
- Kemya
- Saudi Methanol Co (Ar-Razi)
- Yanpet
- Jingga Bin Rasyid Oil Company
- Arabian Industrial Fibers Company (Ibn Rushd)
- Sharq
- SABIC Agri-Nutrients
- Jubail United Petrochemical Company (United)
- Yanbu National Petrochemical Company (Yansab)
- Sabtank
- Saudi Kayan
- Scientific Design
- Samac

== Products ==
- Polyurethanes - Polyether Polyols and Isocyanates-TDI, MDI
- Ethylene
- Propylene
- Butadiene
- Butene-1
- Hexene-1
- Octene-1
- Decene-1
- dodecene-1 (C12)
- Diodecene-1 (C14-18)
- Wax (C20+)
- CIE (crude industrial ethanol)
- MTBE (methyl tert-butyl ether)
- Styrene Monomer
- Benzene
- Paraxylene
- CBO (carbon black oil)
- Caustic soda
- EDC (ethylene dichloride)
- VCM (vinyl chloride monomer)
- Phenol
- Acetone
- Bisphenol A
- Fertilizers
- Methanol
- Lexan (A line of polycarbonate products)
- Noryl PPO
- Cycolac (acrylonitrile butadiene styrene)
- Cycoloy (polycarbonate / acrylonitrile butadiene styrene blend)
- Ultem (polyetherimide)
- Extem (polyimide)
- Geloy (acrylonitrile styrene acrylate / acrylonitrile butadiene styrene blend)
- Valox (polybutylene terephthalate)
- Verton (long fiberglass-reinforced polymers)
- Xenoy (polycarbonate / polybutylene terephthalate blend)
- Xylex (polyester / polycarbonate blend)
- EO/EG (ethylene oxide / ethylene glycol)
- Carbon black
- EPDM rubber
- HaloButyl
- Polybutadiene rubber
- acrylonitrile butadiene styrene
- Polyethylene
- Polycarbonate
- Polypropylene
- Detergent Alcohols (Fatty Alcohol)
- Fatty Alcohol Ethoxylates
- Polyethylene Glycol (PEGs)

== See also ==
- List of largest companies in Saudi Arabia
- List of companies of Saudi Arabia
- Saudi Aramco
