= Saudi Energy =

Saudi Arabian electricity company

Saudi Energy السعودية للطاقة
- Type: Public
- Traded as: Tadawul: 5110
- ISIN: SA0007879550
- Industry: Electric utility
- Founded: 3 May 2000; 26 years ago
- Headquarters: Riyadh, Saudi Arabia
- Key people: Najem Abduallah Alzaid (Chairman); Khalid bin Salem Al-Ghamdi (CEO)
- Revenue: ▲SAR 102.218 billion (2025)
- Operating income: ▲SAR 19.081 billion (2025)
- Net income: ▲SAR 12.975 billion (2025)
- Total assets: ▲SAR 635.823 billion (2025)
- Total equity: ▲SAR 257.684 billion (2025)
- Subsidiaries: Saudi Energy Production Company; National Grid SA Company; Dawiyat Integrated Telecommunications & Information Technology Company; Saudi Electricity Project Development Company (PDC)
- Website: www.se.com.sa/en

Saudi Energy (SE) (Arabic: السعودية للطاقة), formerly the Saudi Electricity Company (SEC), is an electric utility company and the Kingdom's primary power utility, operating across the generation, transmission and distribution of electric power in Saudi Arabia. In 2019, SE was ranked by Forbes as the 5th largest company in the Kingdom, and the 578th worldwide, with total annual sales of $17.1 billion. It was ranked 16th on Forbes Middle East's Top 100 Listed Companies 2025 list.

== History ==
The company was formed in 2000 by Order of the Council of Ministers through a merger of existing regional electricity companies in the Central, Eastern, Western and Southern regions into a single joint stock company.

In 2009, the Electricity and Co-generation Regulatory Authority (ECRA) announced its intention to split the company into four generation companies and separate transmission and distribution companies to encourage competition in the domestic utilities sector. A transmission company – National Grid SA – was established in 2012 to operate the National Grid SA.

In 2014, ECRA was said to have hired advisors on the break-up of the company. ECRA also confirmed the new generation companies will be open to foreign investment.

The company is 81.24% owned by the government, both directly (74.31%) and through Saudi Aramco (6.93%).

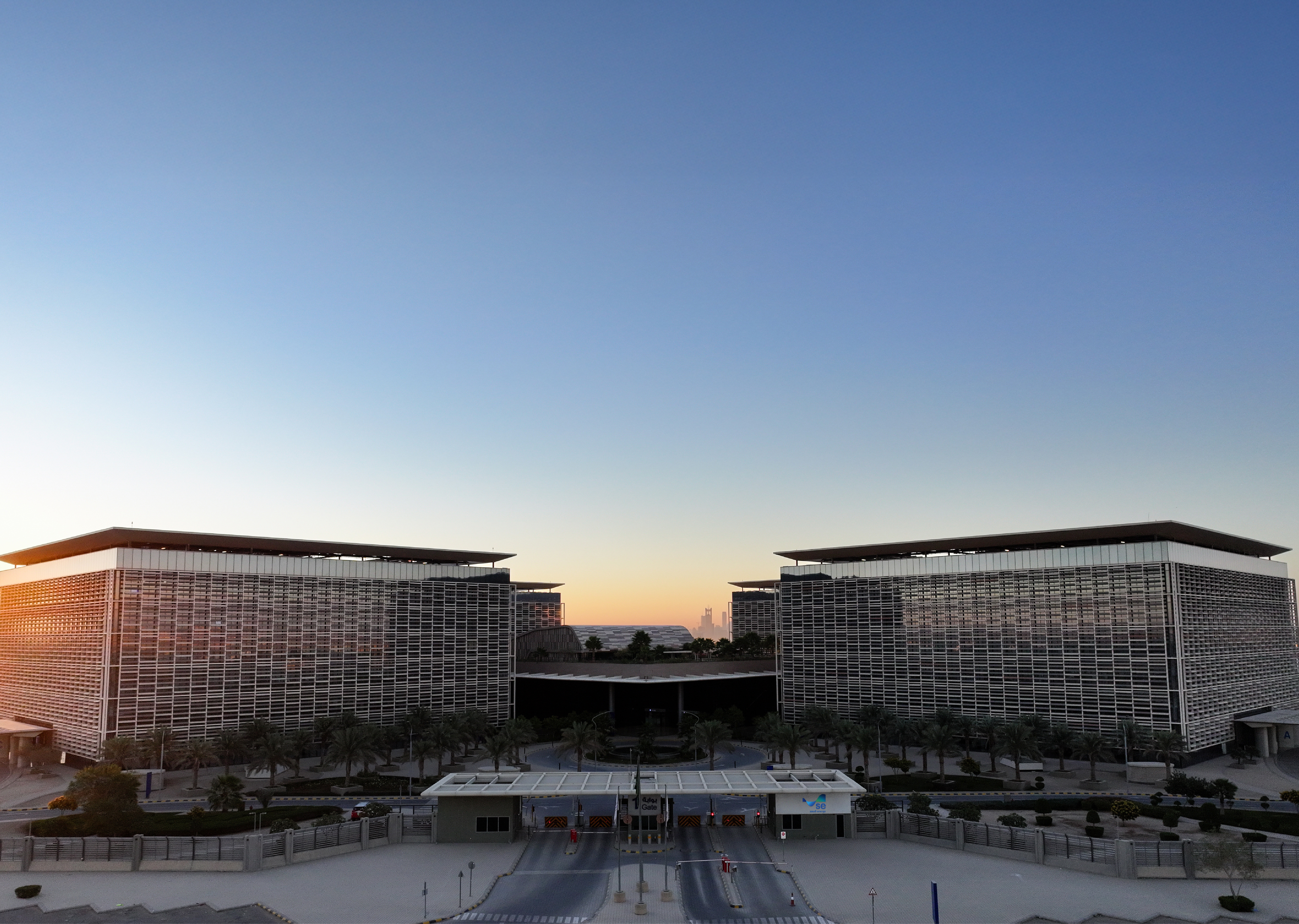
Headquarters of Saudi Energy in Riyadh, Saudi Arabia

In 2015, SEC, Taqnia Energy and King Abdulaziz City for Science and Technology (KACST) agreed to collaborate to build and operate the first standalone solar power station in the country.

For the first six months of 2022, net profit fell 6.6% to SAR7 million, while total comprehensive income slipped 0.14% to SAR7.7 million.

logo used before the rebrand

In February 2026, the Saudi Electricity Company officially rebranded as Saudi Energy (SE), a change intended to reflect the company’s growing role within the Kingdom’s broader energy sector.

== See also ==
- Saudi Electricity
- Energy in Saudi Arabia
