= Saudi Payments Network =

Payment system in Saudi Arabia

Saudi Payments Network (mada)
- Native name: الشبكة السعودية للمدفوعات (مدى)
- Formerly: SPAN
- Type: Government
- Industry: Finance
- Founded: 1990; 36 years ago
- Founder: Saudi Central Bank (SAMA)
- Headquarters: Riyadh Province, Riyadh, Saudi Arabia
- Products: Financial services
- Owner: Saudi Central Bank
- Website: mada.com.sa

The Saudi Payments Network (Arabic: الشبكة السعودية للمدفوعات), commonly known as Mada (Arabic: مدى, literally "range" or "extent"; formerly SPAN), is the primary payment system in Saudi Arabia. Established by the Saudi Central Bank (SAMA), the network connects all automated teller machines (ATMs) and point-of-sale (POS) terminals across the Kingdom to a central payment switch that routes transactions to the appropriate card issuer.

== Overview ==
All banks operating in Saudi Arabia are mandated by SAMA to issue ATM cards that are fully compatible with the network. Customers benefit from free service regardless of the ATM used, its operator, or the card issuer. Mada operates through a vast infrastructure comprising more than 17,000 ATMs and over 225,000 POS terminals within the country. In partnership with global payment systems such as Visa, MasterCard, and Maestro, the network also enables access to millions of ATMs and POS terminals worldwide.

Mada was originally launched as SPAN and later upgraded to SPAN2. This newer version complies with EMV standards and incorporates a higher-capacity infrastructure that reduces transaction processing times—particularly at POS terminals—thereby addressing limitations of the first-generation system.

== Network Statistics ==
As of the latest available data, Mada has achieved significant milestones:

- 1.7 million POS devices in operation across Saudi Arabia.
- 8.9 billion transactions processed through the network.
- 613.9 billion SAR in transaction value.
- 8.6 billion NFC transactions, demonstrating a strong shift towards contactless payments.
- 575.6 billion SAR in NFC transaction value.
- 47.7 million Mada cards issued to customer

== Services and Features ==
Mada supports electronic payments through multiple channels:

- Point-of-Sale (POS) Terminals: Facilitates face-to-face transactions.
- Soft POS: Allows payment acceptance via mobile devices.
- Automated Teller Machines (ATMs): Enables cash withdrawals and other banking functions.
- E-commerce Platforms: Supports online transactions.

The Mada network exclusively issues only debit and prepaid cards, which are always co-branded [Mandatory] with GCC NET and either Visa or MasterCard to ensure international acceptance.

Mada offers two primary payment services:

- Atheer: An NFC (near-field communication) payment service that enables contactless transactions using Mada cards.
- Naqd: A service that permits cardholders to withdraw cash directly from merchants, eliminating the need to visit an ATM or bank branch.

Additionally, Mada has introduced an NFC mobile payment application—Mada Pay—available only on Android devices. This application supports the addition of Mada, MasterCard, and Visa cards issued by banks or digital wallets in Saudi Arabia.

== Partnerships and Acceptance ==
Mada has established partnerships with a range of global payment networks to facilitate its use on POS devices, ATMs, and online gateways. The following networks are accepted, subject to merchant discretion (with mandatory acceptance of Mada network):

- VISA: Accepted on POS terminals, ATMs, and online.
- VISA Electron: Primarily available on ATMs.
- VISA Plus: Primarily available on ATMs.
- MasterCard: Accepted on POS terminals, ATMs, and online.
- Maestro: Primarily available on ATMs.
- Cirrus: Primarily available on ATMs.
- GCC Net: Accepted on POS terminals, ATMs through MADA
- Discover: Accepted on POS terminals, ATMs, and online.
- Diners Club: Accepted on POS terminals, ATMs, and online.
- American Express: Accepted on POS terminals, ATMs, and online.
- UnionPay: Accepted on POS terminals, ATMs, and online.
- JCB: Accepted on POS terminals, ATMs, and online.
- Alipay+: Officially Coming in 2026
- Samsung Pay: Accepted on POS terminals and online.
- Apple Pay: Accepted on POS terminals and online.
- Google Pay: Accepted on POS terminals and online.

All these payment networks are approved by SAMA and integrated through Mada; however, acceptance by individual merchants may vary.

== Member banks and E-wallets in the MADA network ==
Local Banks in Saudi Arabia
No.	Bank Name (English)	Bank Name (Arabic)
1	Alinma Bank	الإنماء
2	Al-Rajhi Bank	مصرف الراجحي
3	Arab National Bank (ANB)	البنك العربي الوطني
4	Bank AlBilad	بنك البلاد
5	Aljazira Bank (ajb)	بنك الجزيرة
6	Banque Saudi Fransi (BSF)	البنك السعودي الفرنسي
7	Meem, Gulf International Bank	بنك الخليج الدولي، ميم
8	Riyad Bank	بنك الرياض
9	Saudi Awwal Bank (SAB)	البنك الأول (ساب)
10	Saudi National Bank (SNB)	البنك الأهلي
11	The Saudi Investment Bank (SAIB)	البنك السعودي للاستثمار

Digital E-Wallets
No.	E-Wallet Name	Issues Mada Cards	Mada Pay Support
1	Urpay by Rajhi Bank	Yes	Yes
2	Barq	Yes	Yes
3	Alinma Pay by Alinma Bank	Yes	Yes
4	Tiqmo	Coming soon	Yes
5	Mobily Pay	No	Yes
6	Tweeq	Yes	Yes
7	Enjaz by Bank Al Bilad	Yes	Yes
8	Hala	Yes	Yes
9	Sifi	Coming soon	Yes
10	DarbPay	No	Yes
11	Loop	No	No

Local Digital Banks in Saudi Arabia
No.	Bank Name	Arabic
1	D360 Bank	دي 360 بنك
2	STC Bank	بنك إس تي سي
3	Vision Bank	فيزيون بنك

Digital Banking Experience by Local Banks
No.	Experience/App Name	In Arabic
1	NEO by SNB Bank	نيو من البنك الأهلي السعودي
2	Bouki by Riyad Bank	بُوكي من بنك الرياض
3	Iz by Alinma Bank	عِز من مصرف الإنماء

Foreign Licensed Banks in Saudi Arabia
No.	Country	Bank	Logo
1	United Arab Emirates	Emirates NBD KSA	
2	United Arab Emirates	First Abu Dhabi Bank (FAB)	

== History ==
- In 1952, the Saudi Central Bank was established.
- In 1990, Saudi Payment Network (SPAN) services for ATMs were launched, along with Visa and Mastercard acceptance.
- In 1993, Point of Sale (POS) service was introduced.
- In 1994, SPAN transactions were accepted in Gulf Cooperation Council (GCC) countries through the Gulf payments network. GCC payments network was also accepted in Saudi Arabia, and AMEX Cards were now accepted.
- In 2008, international security standards were implemented for all bankcards issued in Saudi Arabia. The international system for smart payment card standards was also implemented.
- In 2012, compliance with the international payment card security standard (PCI) was achieved.
- In 2015, the new identity of the Saudi Payment Network, Mada, was launched.
- In 2016, Union Pay Cards were accepted.
- In 2017, two new payment services, Mada Atheer and Mada Naqd, were launched.
- In 2018, Mada e-Commerce service and Apple Pay were introduced. Mada Pay was launched.
- In 2020, JCB Cards were accepted (Limited Support)
- In 2021, the Soft Point of Sale (Soft POS) system was introduced. New features for Mada e-Commerce, including Preauthorization and Card on File, were developed.
- In 2022, Discover Diner Club transactions were accepted in Saudi Arabia.
- In 2023, Mada Transit was launched.
- In 2024, Samsung Pay was introduced and accepted.
- In 2025, JCB Cards were integrated with the MADA system and widely accepted
- In 2025, Google Pay was introduced and accepted
- In 2025, SAMA Announced that Alipay+ will be accepted by 2026 Through MADA

== Images and Logo ==
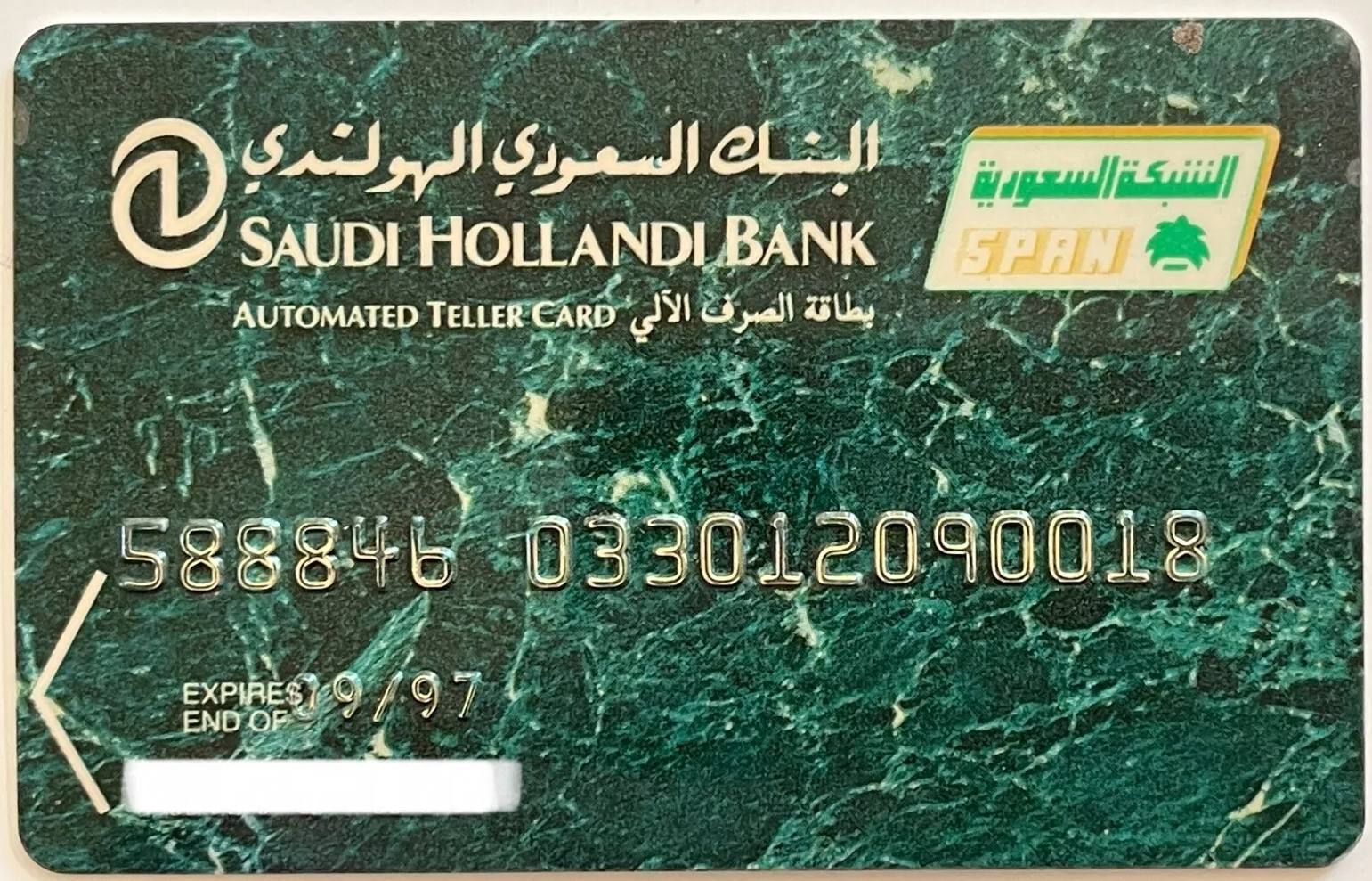
One of the earliest SPAN ATM cards in Saudi Arabia, issued by the Kingdom’s first bank

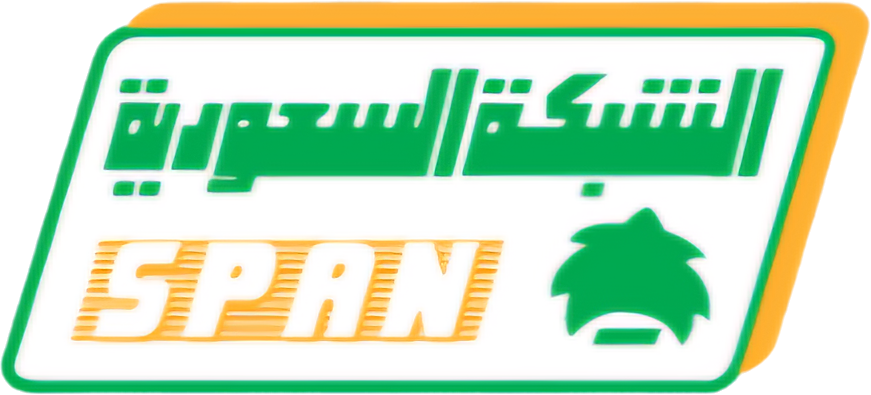
SPAN logo

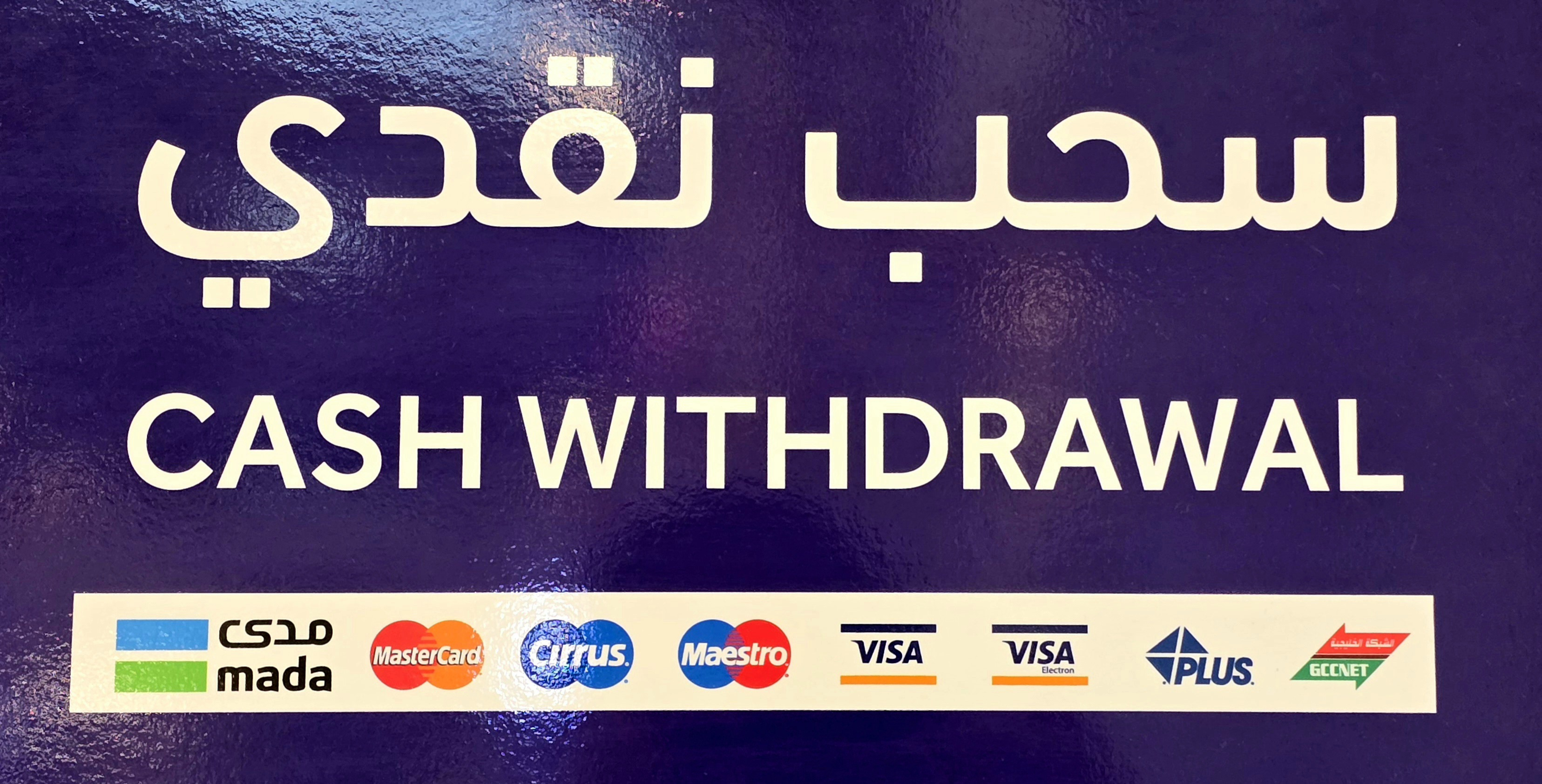
MADA and multiple networks supported by an ATM

ALL NETWORKS WHICH ARE APPROVED BY SAMA SUPPORTED — HORIZONTAL, WHITE BACKGROUND

MADA ONLY ACCEPTED — HORIZONTAL, WHITE BACKGROUND

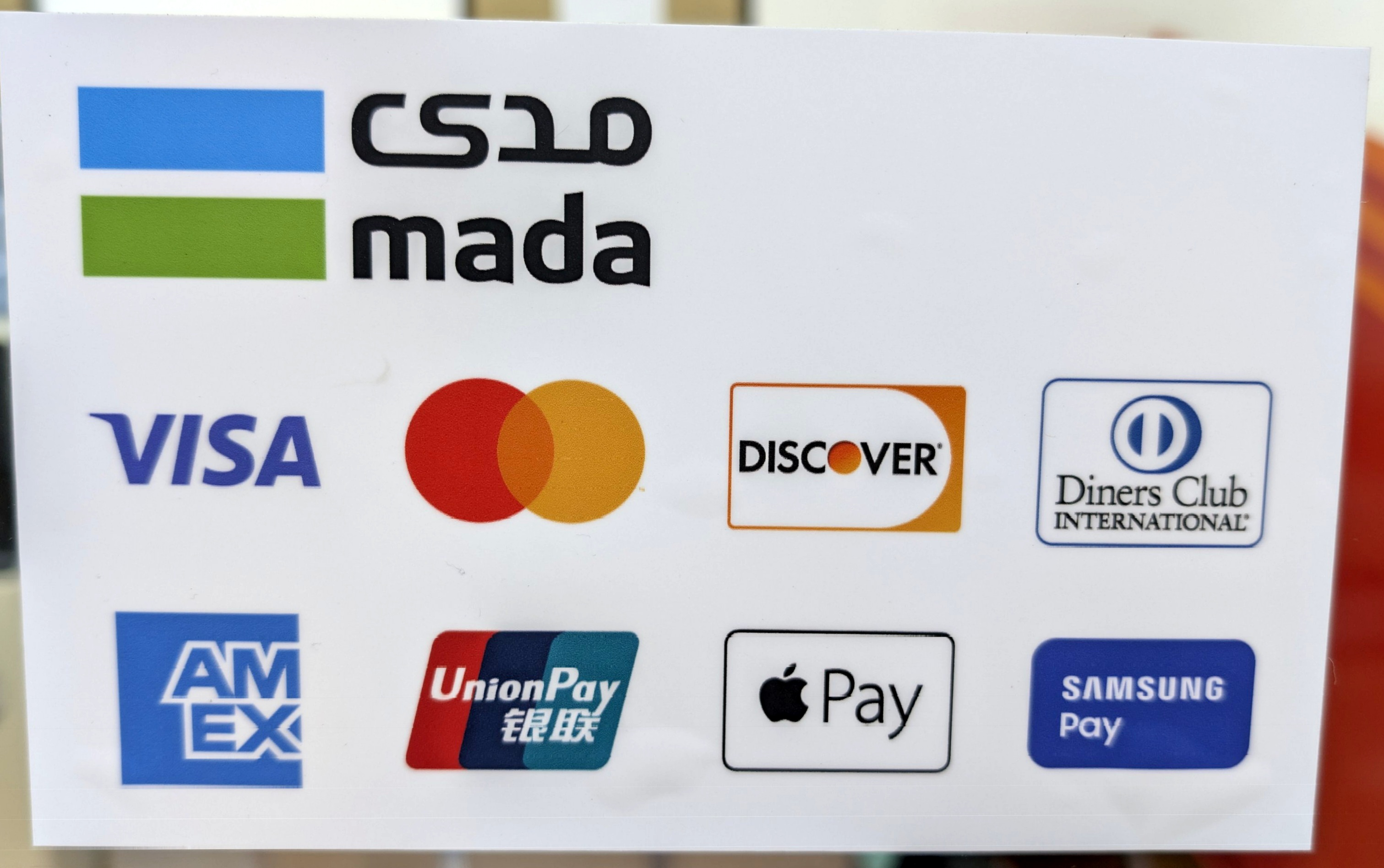
MADA and multiple networks supported by a merchant — HORIZONTAL, WHITE BACKGROUND

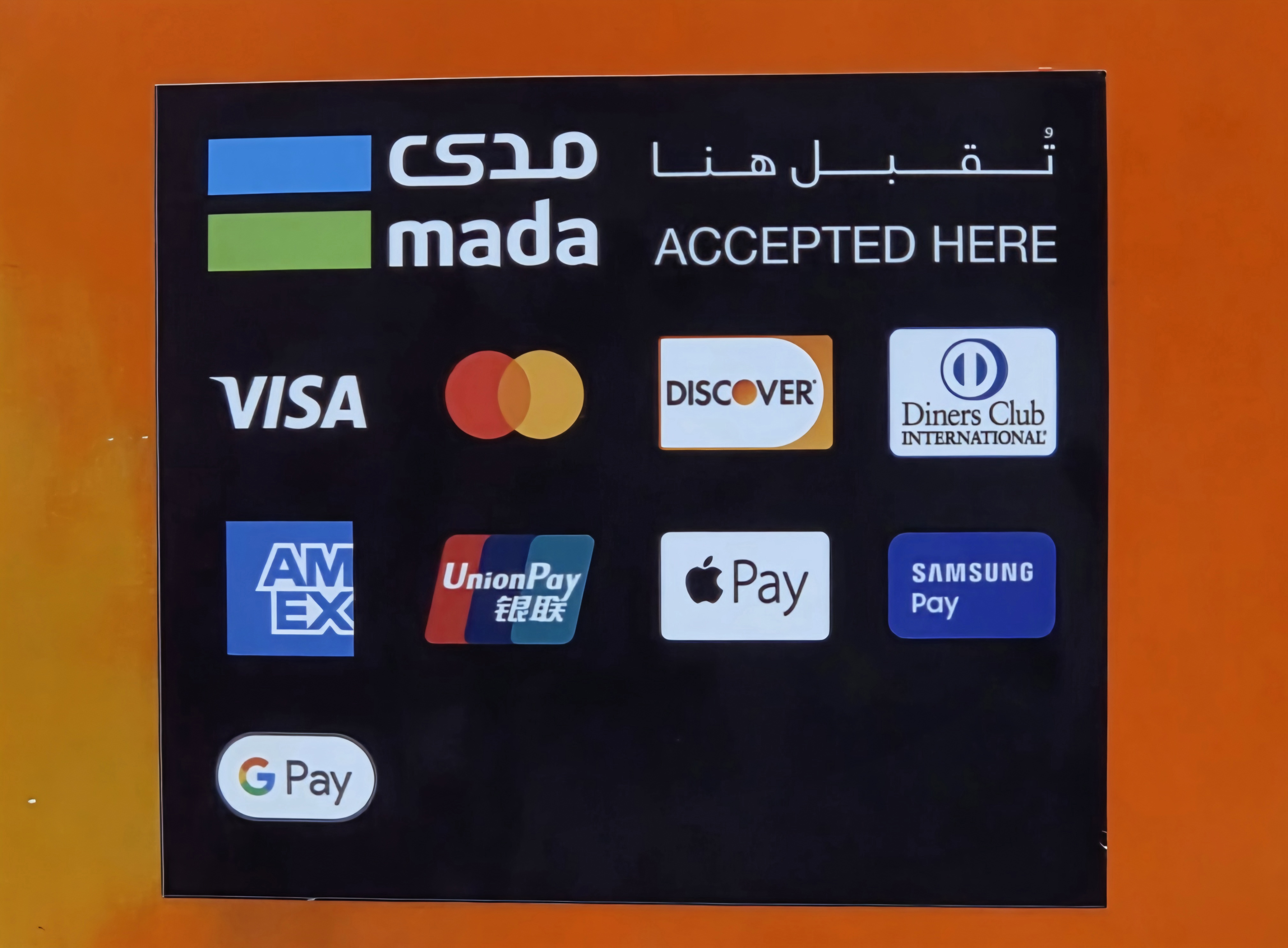
MADA and multiple networks supported by a merchant — HORIZONTAL, BLACK BACKGROUND

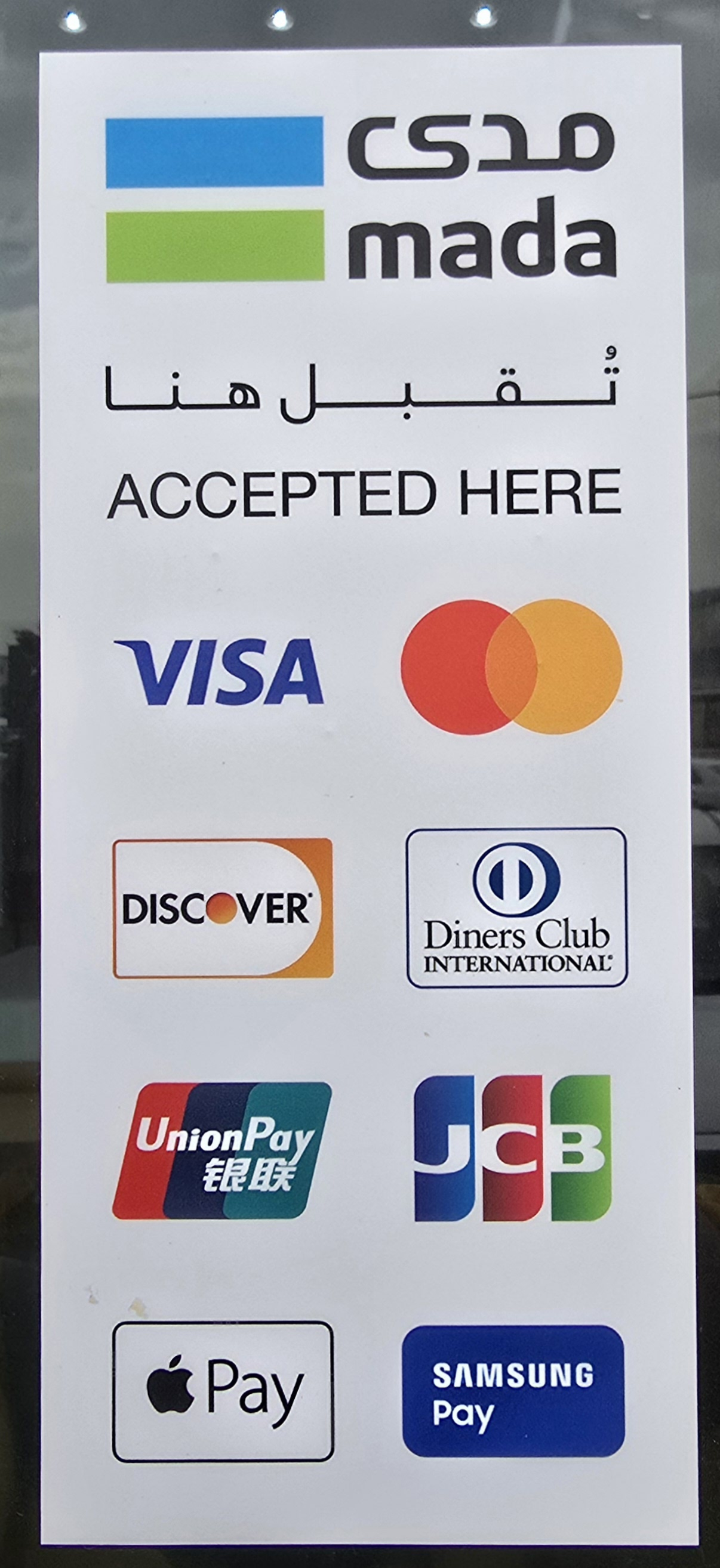
MADA and multiple networks supported by a merchant — VERTICAL, WHITE BACKGROUND

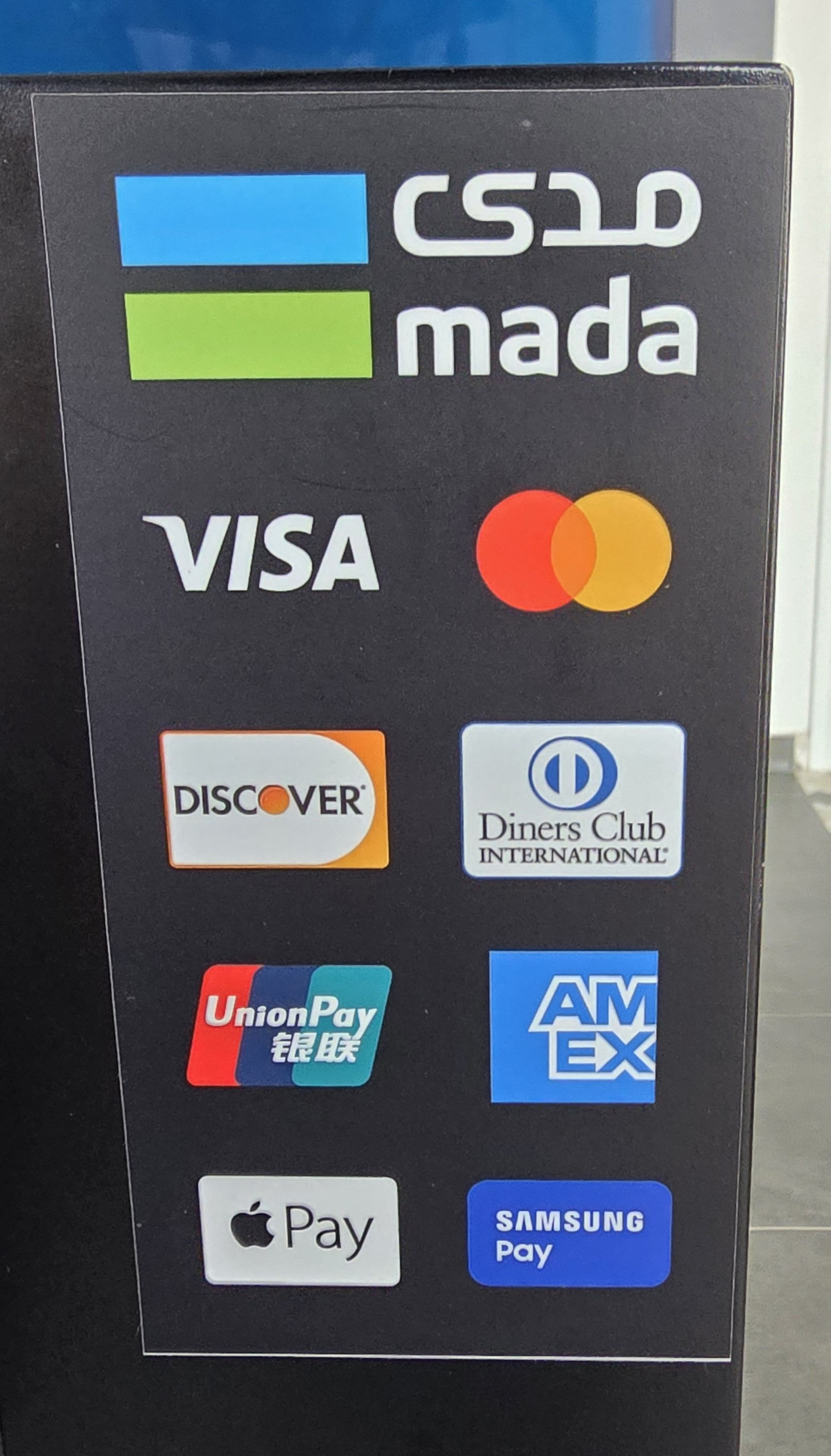
MADA and multiple networks supported by a merchant — VERTICAL, BLACK BACKGROUND

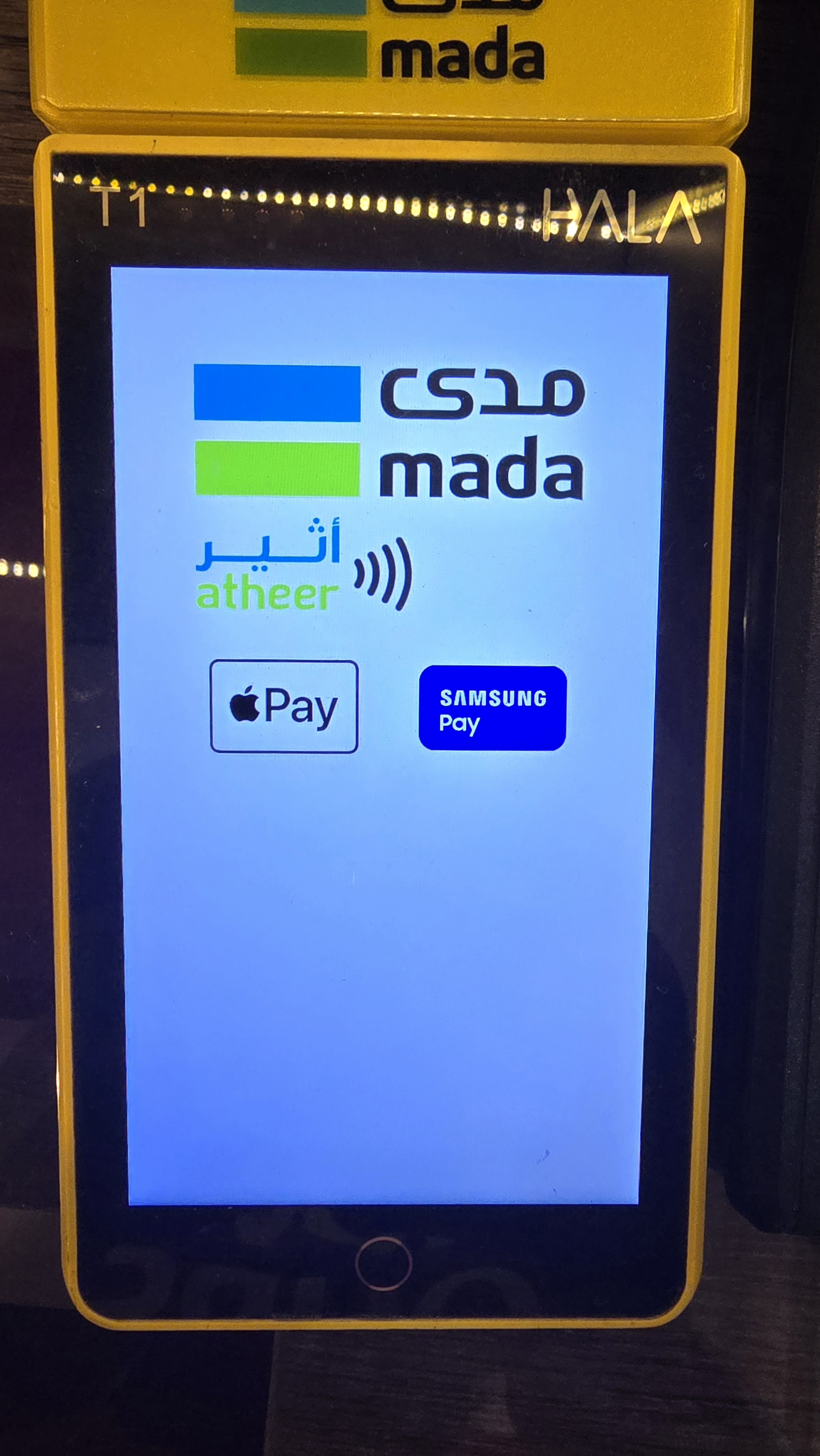
T1, HALA, MADA POS — Only MADA network supported

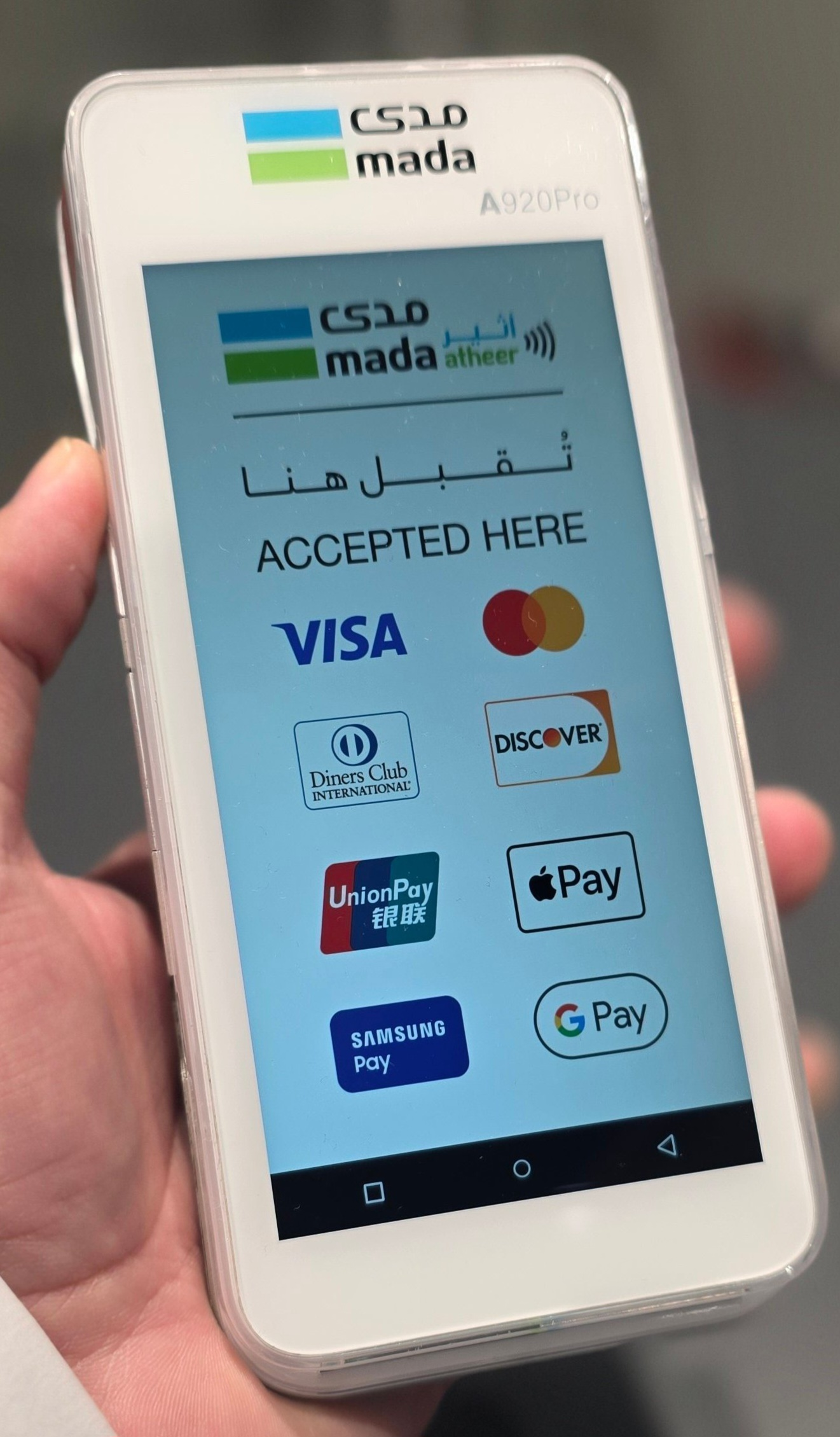
PAX A920, GEIDEA, MADA POS — Multiple networks supported

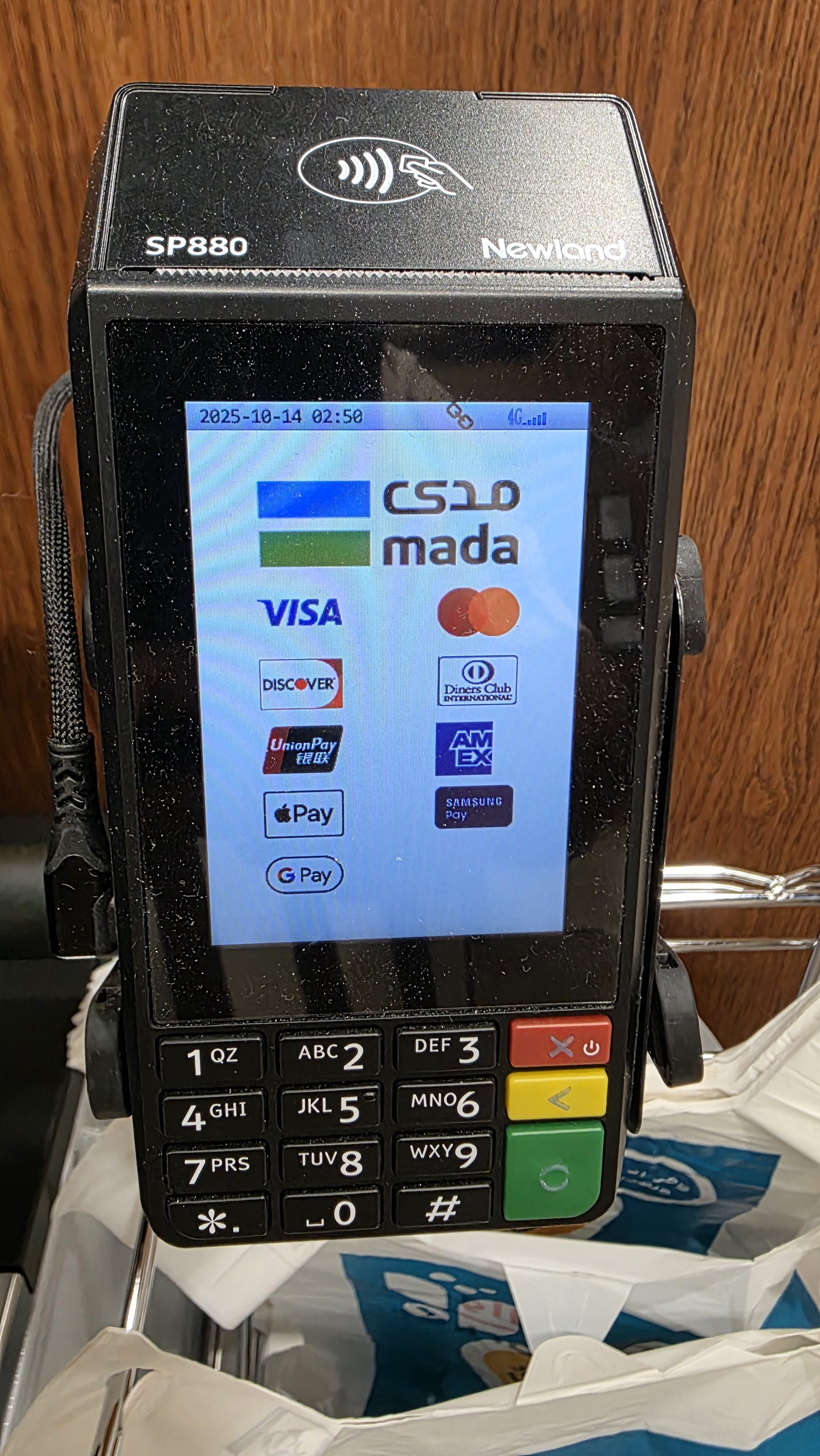
Newland SP880, MADA POS — Multiple networks supported

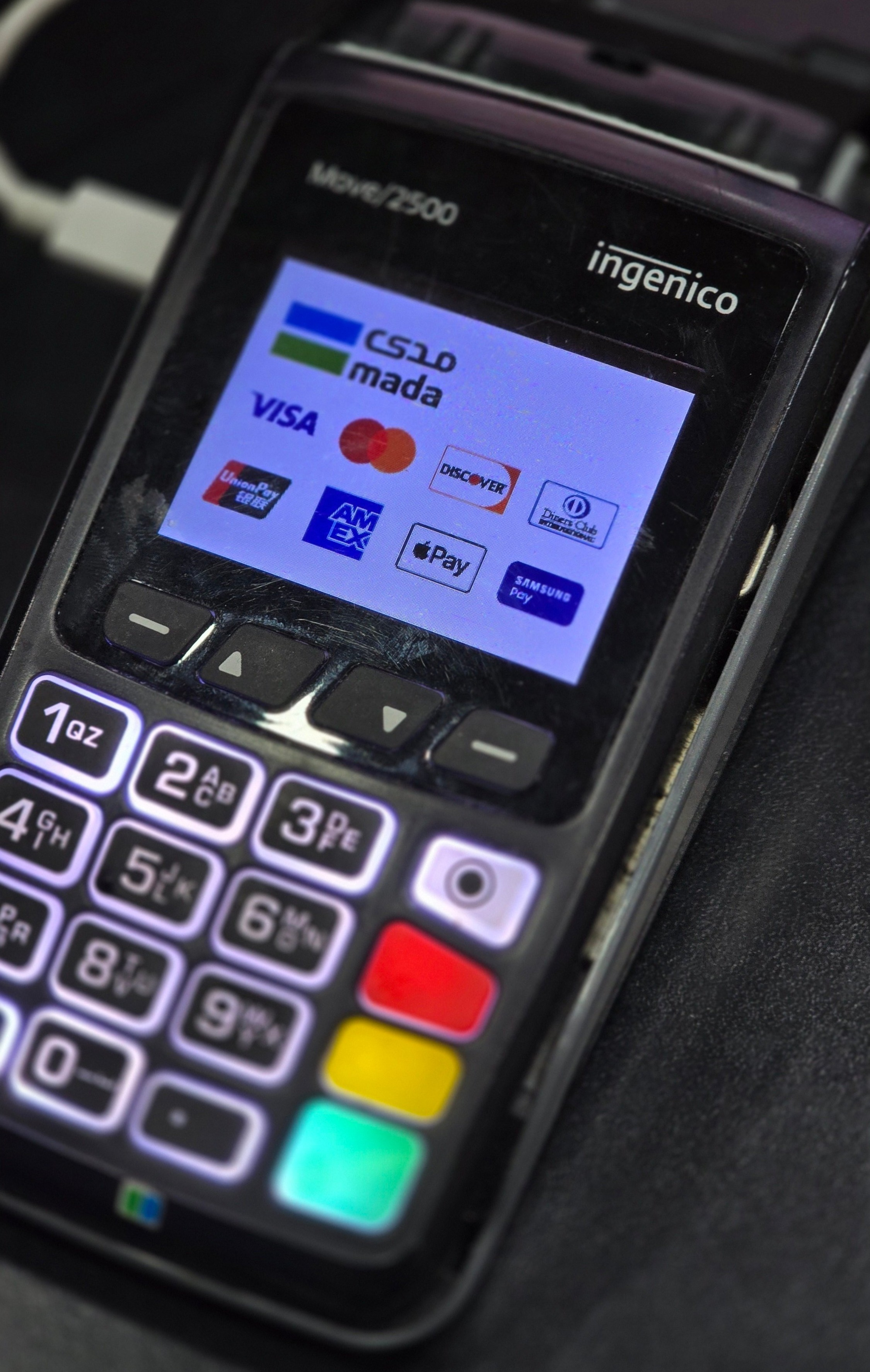
Ingenico Move/2500, MADA POS — Multiple networks supported

== See also ==
- Smart card
- Visa Inc.
- American Express
- MasterCard
