= SADAD =

National electronic payment service of Saudi Arabia

The SADAD payment system was established by the Saudi Central Bank (SAMA) to be the national electronic bill presentment and payment (EBPP) service provider for the Kingdom of Saudi Arabia (KSA). The core mandate for SADAD is to facilitate and streamline bill payment transactions of end consumers through all channels of the KSA (Kingdom of Saudi Arabia) Banks. SADAD was launched on June 7, 2007.

== History and background ==
SAMA mandated that all banks accept bill payments from anyone at their branches. The payer does not have to be a customer of the bank. Pre-SADAD economics of bill payment placed an unduly significant burden on banks; it needed to be more efficient and faster. Banks recovered a small portion of the cost by keeping the collected money for 7–30 days after the bill was paid.

Approximately 60-70% of bills were paid in cash at bank branches. The high number of invoices generated in the Kingdom increases bank costs in the front office, payment processing, IT integration and reconciliation. In addition, consumers queue for a long time at banks’ front office desks before paying their bills. Bill presentment and collection are primarily manual and paper-based, creating significant inefficiencies and overheads for billers and banks.

Large billers formed bilateral agreements with banks to enhance bill payment collection. This enabled consumers to use their bank channels to view and pay bills (without any bill consolidation). It required every biller to connect to the twelve banks operating in KSA and from banks to connect separately to every biller under contract.

SAMA chose to integrate these connections through SADAD, a single platform that links different billers and banks to enable consumers to use the electronic channels of any bank. SADAD is now facilitating the payment of high-volume periodic bills (such as utility and phone bills) and customer-initiated payments, such as traffic fines.

== How SADAD works ==
1. Billers send summary bills information to SADAD at a pre-determined schedule
2. SADAD validates data received and uploads it into its database
3. SADAD notifies billers of any discrepancies
4. Customer requests bill information through bank channels
5. The bank forwards the request received to SADAD
6. SADAD retrieves bill information from its database and forwards it to the bank channel
7. Customer selects the bills to be paid and the respective amounts
8. The bank debits the customer account and confirms the transaction
9. SADAD updates its database based on the bank’s confirmation
10. SADAD notifies relevant billers accordingly
11. At the end of the day, billers receive reconciliation reports from SADAD showing a breakdown of all transactions processed by SADAD
12. At the end of the day, SADAD initiates settlement instructions through SARIE
13. SADAD updates bills status to 'settled'

== Connected billers ==
Billers connected to SADAD
Biller	Code
Educational services (9)
King Abdulaziz University	9
Al Yamamah University	72
King Saud University	80
Arab Open University (AOU)	17
King Abdulaziz City for Science and Technology (KACST)	105
Taibah University	106
King Faisal University	118
King Fahd University of Petroleum and Minerals	117
Umm al-Qura University	132
Saudi Electronic University	137
Financial and insurance services (20)
SHB Credit Cards	31
NCCI	3
Samba Financial Group (credit card)	12
NCB (credit card and personal finance)	16
American Express	18
SABB PS	29
Awan For Market Data	39
Mubasher	34
Falcon Credit Card from NCB	56
Bank Al-Jazira Credit Card and Financing Services	78
Arab National Bank	82
Al-Rajhi Bank	54
Riyad Bank	67
Saudi Credit Bureau (SIMAH)	36
Banque Saudi Fransi	71
Emirates NBD	125
Nayifat Installment Company	124
Al Rajhi Takaful	110
Bupa Arabia for Cooperative Insurance	130
Arabian Shield Cooperative Insurance Company	136
Government services (65)
Madina Municipality	6
Ministry of Water and Electricity	15
Riyadh Municipality	10
The Department of Zakat and Income Tax	20
Holy Makkah Municipality	27
Jeddah Municipality	28
Communications and Information Technology Commission	42
Eastern Province Municipality	25
Jeddah Chamber of Commerce and Industry	19
The Saudi Arabian Agricultural Bank	45
Saudi Arabian Standards Organization	49
Saudi Customs	30
Ministry of Commerce and Industry	13
General Commission for Tourism and Antiquities	57
Saudi Credit and Saving Bank	58
Tabouk Province Municipality	62
Hail Province Municipality	61
Jazan Province Municipality	64
Ministry of Transport	75
Qiyas	8
Ministry of Culture and Information	51
Ministry of Labor	50
Riyadh Chamber of Commerce and Industry	73
AlQassim Province Municipality	70
Real Estate Development Fund	40
The Saudi Industrial Property Authority (Modon)	68
The General Organization for Social Insurance (GOSI)	60
Aseer Province Municipality	84
Ministry of Finance	88
MOI-Alien Control	90
MOI-Driving License	91
MOI-Saudi Passport	92
MOI-Traffic Violation	93
MOI-Motor Vehicle	94
MOI-Labour Importation	95
MOI-Civil Registration	96
Najran Province Municipality	87
AlJouf Provence Municipality	103
Saudi Ports Authority	89
Ministry of Islamic Affairs (MOIA)	77
Ministry of Social Affairs (Global Goodness)	66
Municipality of Northern Borders	102
Saudi Food And Drugs Authority	109
General Authority of Civil Aviation	98
Baha Province Municipality	104
AlAhsa Municipality	112
Royal Commission in Yanbu (RCY)	46
Taif Municipality	113
Saudi Arabian General Investment Authority (SAGIA)	108
Deputy Ministry for Mineral Resources (DMMR)	116
ABHA Chamber of Commerce and Industry	114
MOI Deportation Sentences	126
MOI Deportation Control	127
Ministry of Health	128
Saudi Council of Engineers	123
Government E-Procurement Project	141
Industrial Cities Development and Operating Co.	145
Saudi Heart Association	133
Ejar	153
Economic Cities Authority	154
Royal Commission for Jubail	146
Saudi Industrial Development Fund	143
ASHARQIA Chamber	139
Ministry of Foreign Affairs	101
Ministry of Justice	160
Ministry of Municipal and Rural Affairs	177
Ministry of Justice Execution Agency (Judicial Execution )	169
Other services (18)
Maestro Pizza	1041
Alyusr Instalment Co.	24
AlYamamah Press Establishment	47
Al-Jazirah Newspaper	53
Arab Media Company	76
Aljomaih Automotive Company	52
Al Amthal Financing and Leasing Co. Ltd.	79
Dar Alyoum Pressing, Printing and Publishing	74
Tajeer Company	63
Aljabr Trading Company	86
United Instalment Sales Company	65
Al-Hamrani Company for Investment in Trade	23
United Electronics Company (Extra)	134
Saudi Commission for Health Specialties	129
Arabian Tasheelat Establishment (Tasheel)	131
Saudi Home Loans	147
AQSAT International Trading Company	69
Dar Al-Hayat for Distribution	121
Mawarid	157
Rosom	901
Technology and media (10)
SaudiNet	38
Cyberia	59
Showtime	32
Sahara Net	48
AwalNet	41
Saudi Business Machines	83
Integrated Telecom Company	55
Al-Elm Information Security	85
Ola Almajd Trading Co. (Al Majd TV)	81
Thiqah Business Services	144
Telecommunications and utilities (19)
Saudi Telecom Company	1
Saudi Electricity Company	2
Mobily	5
Marafiq	4
The Saudi Home PC Initiative	7
Bravo	14
Saudi Post	21
Cadre Economic Cities	35
Zain Telecommunication Company	44
Go Telecom (Etihad Atheeb Telecom)	33
Saudi Project for Utilization of Hajj Meat	43
Perfect Presentation Telecommunication & IT (2P)	107
International Water Distribution Company Ltd.	122
King Abdulaziz City for Science and Technology	105
National Water Company	138
Saudi e-Tabadul Company	135
National Gas and Industrialization Company	148
Virgin Mobile	151
Saudi Telecom Company (SAWA)	149
Transportation services (4)
Nas Air	26
Saudi Arabian Airlines	22
Saudi Railways Organization (SRO)	120
SAPTCO	150

== See also ==
- Electronic billing
- E-commerce payment systems
- Saudi Payments Network (SPAN)
