= Abdulaziz Al-Onaizan =

Saudi Arabian businessman

- عبدالعزيز العنيزان
- Born: 16 October 1966 (age 59); Ar-Rass, Saudi Arabia
- Education: Ar-Rass Secondary School (high school); King Saud University (college)
- Occupation: CEO of Bank Albilad

Abdulaziz bin Mohammed Al-Onaizan (born 16 October 1966) is a Saudi Arabian businessman who is chief executive officer (CEO) of Bank Albilad. Al-Onaizan joined Bank Albilad in 2014, where he was a chief business officer. In 2016, he was appointed as the bank's CEO.

== Early life ==
Al-Onaizan was born in Saudi Arabia and raised in Ar-Rass. He attended Ar-Rass Secondary School for high school. He then moved to Riyadh for college and attended King Saud University. In 1987, he obtained his bachelor's degree on quantitative methods.

== Career ==
In 1991, Al-Onaizan joined Samba Financial Group as the head of treasury. He then moved to Arab National Bank in 2004 and Alinma Bank in 2008 serving as the deputy chief executive officer of treasury and the head of treasury respectively. In 2014, Al-Onaizan joined Bank Albilad as the chief business officer (CBO). In 2016, he was appointed as the chief executive officer (CEO).

Al-Onaizan additionally serves as the vice-chairman of the board of directors and as a member of the executive committee, both respectively a part of the Albilad Investing Company. He is also a board member in five other joint stock companies: Enjaz, Buna, the Human Resources Development Fund (HRDF), the Real Estate Development Fund (REDF) and the Zakat, Tax and Customs Authority (ZATCA). He simultaneously holds the position of chairman of the board of directors for Enjaz, chairman of the executive committee for the HRDF as well as chairman of governance and cybersecurity for the REDF.

== Personal life ==
Al-Onaizan resides in Riyadh. He is a Sunni-Muslim, and speaks Arabic and English.
