= Sarah Al-Suhaimi =

Chair of the Saudi Arabian stock exchange

- Education: King Saud University
- Occupations: Chair Bahri, Chair Lazard MENA * previously Chairperson of Tadawul 2017-2026: previously CEO of NCB Capital

Sarah Al-Suhaimi (Arabic: سارة جمازالسحيمي) is a Saudi businesswoman who is the first woman chair of the Saudi Arabian stock exchange (Tadawul), the largest stock market in the Middle East. She chairs today Saudi National Shipping Company Bahri as well Lazard MENA. She was also the CEO and a board director of NCB Capital, the investment arm of the National Commercial Bank, the largest bank in Saudi Arabia. During her years leading NCB Capital, assets under management more than quadrupled, and market share grew in brokerage and corporate finance.

== Career ==
Al-Suhaimi was the chief investment officer at Jadwa Investment, an independent asset management boutique, which she joined in 2007 as head of portfolio management. She began her investing career in the asset management division of Samba, where she advanced to become a Senior Portfolio Manager, co-managing US$12 billion in local equities.

In 2017, Ms. Al-Suhaimi was named one of "50 people to watch" by Bloomberg Businessweek.

Her father was Jammaz Al-Suhaimi, a former president of the Capital Markets Authority of Saudi Arabia between 2004 and 2006 and former president of the Gulf Bank.

Ms. Al-Suhaimi graduated with highest honors from the accounting program at King Saud University, and completed the General Management Program at Harvard Business School in 2015.

She is a board member of Saudia airlines, STC, General Authority of Statistics and the Culture Development Fund in KSA.

She was a trustee of the IFRS Foundation.
