= Money20/20 =

Global fintech conference series

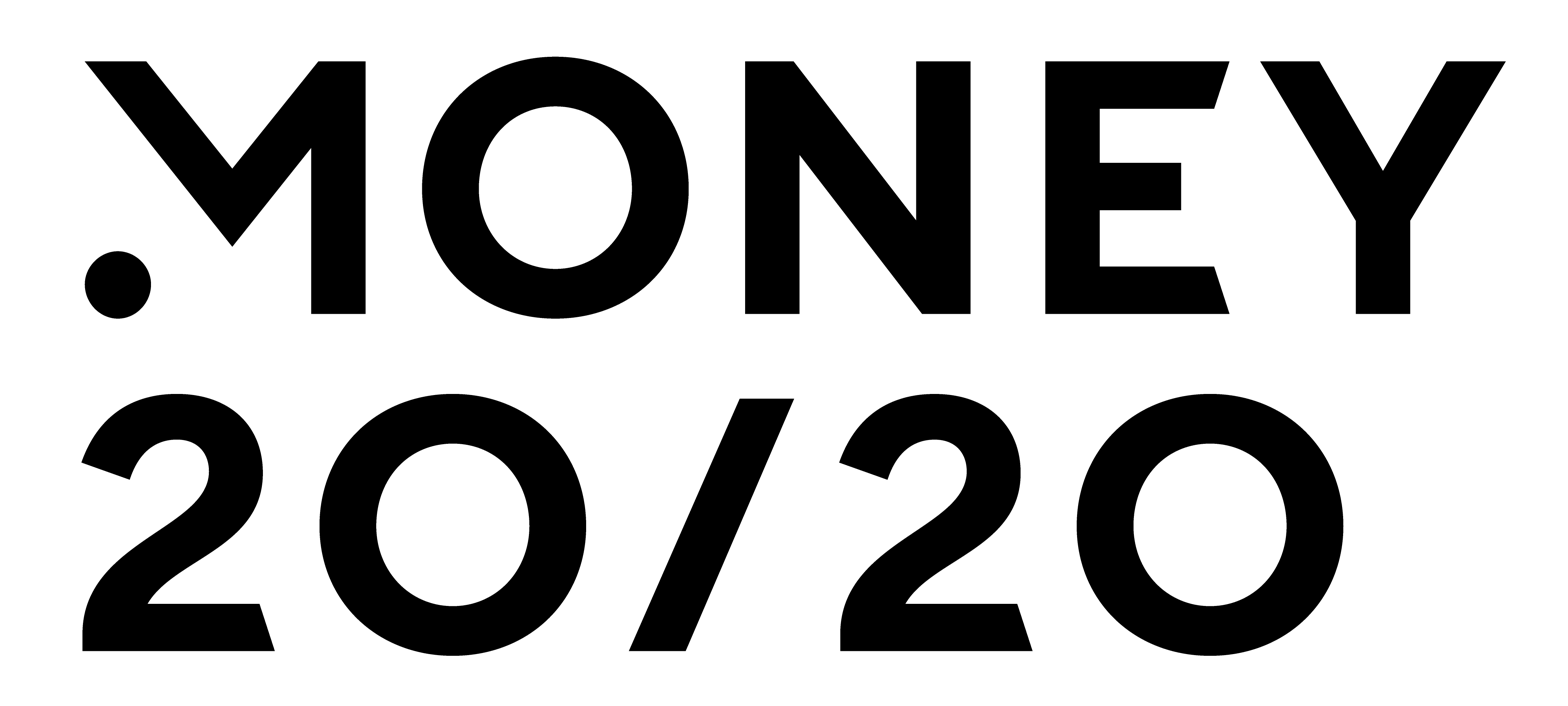

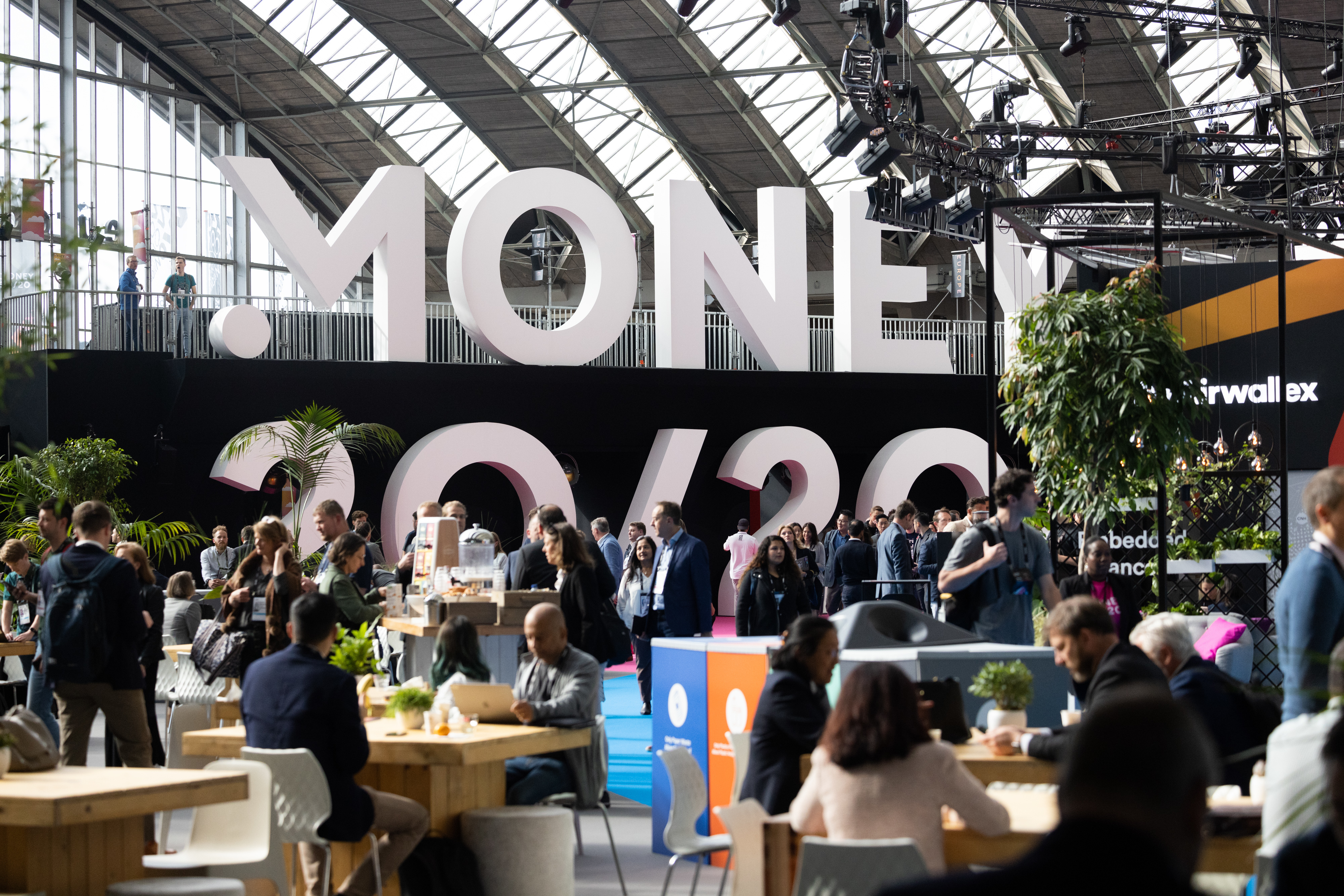
- Attendees at Money20/20 Amsterdam in 2023
- Status: Active
- Genre: Fintech; Financial services; Payments; Banking
- Frequency: Annual (per regional edition)
- Venue: The Venetian Las Vegas (USA); RAI Amsterdam Convention Centre, Bella Center (Europe); Queen Sirikit National Convention Center (Asia)
- Locations: Las Vegas, U.S.; Amsterdam, Netherlands; Bangkok, Thailand; Riyadh, Saudi Arabia; Miami, U.S.
- Country: United States, Netherlands, Denmark, Thailand, Saudi Arabia
- Inaugurated: October 22, 2012; 14 years ago
- Founder: Anil D. Aggarwal and Jonathan Weiner
- Organizer: Informa Festivals
- Website: money2020.com

Money20/20 is a series of business conferences and trade shows focused on payments and financial technology. Established by entrepreneurs Anil D. Aggarwal and Jonathan Weiner in 2011, the inaugural event was held in Las Vegas in October 2012 and attracted about 2,300 delegates.

Since then the brand has expanded to Europe, Asia and the Middle East and is widely described by trade press as one of the largest global gatherings of the fintech sector.

Money20/20 was acquired by the British events company i2i Events Group in 2014. Through a series of corporate changes, i2i's parent Top Right Group rebranded to Ascential in December 2015 and, following Ascential's sale to the exhibitions group Informa in October 2024, Money20/20 now sits within the Informa Festivals division.

== History ==
=== Founding and first edition (2011–2013) ===
Aggarwal and Weiner created Money20/20 to provide a meeting point for the digital-payers.

The first conference ran from 22 to 24 October 2012 at The Venetian, Las Vegas, drawing roughly 2,300 professionals from across the payments value chain.

Early growth was rapid: by 2015 the U.S. edition reported more than 10,400 attendees, a year-on-year increase of around 37%.

=== Acquisition by i2i Events Group (2014) ===
In October 2014 Money20/20 was acquired by i2i Events Group, then a subsidiary of Top Right Group, for an undisclosed sum. The founders, Aggarwal and Weiner, remained in leadership under a long-term partnership arrangement, and the deal was explicitly framed around international expansion, beginning with a planned European edition. Top Right Group rebranded to Ascential in December 2015 and listed on the London Stock Exchange in February 2016, carrying Money20/20 with it.

=== Global expansion (2016–2023) ===
Europe – The first European edition took place 5–7 April 2016 at the Bella Center in Copenhagen, having been announced in October 2014. In 2018 the event moved to the RAI Amsterdam to accommodate larger crowds.

Asia – Money20/20 Asia debuted 13–15 March 2018 at Marina Bay Sands, Singapore. The Asia show was paused during the COVID-19 pandemic, and on its relaunch in 2024 the event moved its base to Bangkok, Thailand, with the Queen Sirikit National Convention Center secured as host venue.

China – A standalone China show was held 14–16 November 2018 at the Hangzhou International Expo Center, supported by municipal authorities.

By 2023 the flagship U.S. show in Las Vegas expected over 11,500 attendees, while the European edition in Amsterdam recorded more than 7,500 participants.

=== Sale to Informa and beyond (2024–present) ===
In October 2024 Informa plc completed its acquisition of Ascential, valued at approximately £1.2 billion, bringing Money20/20 under the newly created Informa Festivals umbrella, which began operating from 1 January 2025.

In 2026 Fintech Americas, a Miami-based conference focused on financial innovation across Latin America, was brought under the Money20/20 brand, returning to Miami as part of the portfolio.

=== Middle-East ===
A Middle-East edition, Money20/20 Middle East, was held in Riyadh, Saudi Arabia, on 15–17 September 2025. Organised by Tahaluf in partnership with Fintech Saudi, it evolved from the 24Fintech conference first staged in Riyadh in 2024, and reported more than 38,500 attendees at its inaugural edition. It is now intended as an annual financial technology conference held in Riyadh, Saudi Arabia.

It evolved from 24Fintech, a fintech-focused conference introduced in Riyadh in 2024 and co-organised by Fintech Saudi and Tahaluf. Following its first edition, 24Fintech was merged into the global Money20/20 portfolio following Informa's acquisition of Ascential, the owner of Money20/20.

The first edition under the Money20/20 name was held from 15 to 17 September 2025 at the Riyadh Exhibition & Convention Center in Malham. It hosted 38,500 attendees, 450 speakers, 451 exhibiting brands, 1,050 investors and 150 start-ups. The event was supported by major Saudi regulatory bodies, including the Financial Sector Development Program, the Saudi Central Bank, the Capital Market Authority and the Insurance Authority. The event brought together financial institutions, regulators, investors, technology companies, founders and policy leaders to discuss developments in payments, digital banking, financial regulation, artificial intelligence and financial innovation.

The 2025 edition introduced the Venturescape programme, an invite-only pre-show forum facilitating more than 500 investor and founder meetings. The event also launched the MoneySurge 20/20 Pitch Competition, offering US$400,000 in equity-free funding to four winners.

Money20/20 Middle East 2025 reported $4.6 billion in deal announcements, including a $2.4 billion facility raised by Tamara, a $1.75 billion investment initiative announced by Fasanara Capital and the Ministry of Investment, and $157 million raised by HALA in Series B funding.

The 2025 edition featured 450 speakers from 41 countries, representing financial services, regulatory authorities, investment firms and technology companies. Notable participants included Caroline D. Pham, (Acting Chairman, U.S. Commodity Futures Trading Commission) Mohammed Rahim Group (CDO at Standard Chartered), Brett King (Founder and Host, Breaking Banks), Lori Schwartz (Global Head of Treasury Services at J.P. Morgan) Veronique Steiner (MD at J.P. Morgan Payments), Bassam Suliman Al Ediy (CEO at Enjaz).

Money20/20 Middle East is supported by major financial institutions, government bodies and technology companies. Founding partners for the 2025 edition, included Riyad Bank, Al Rajhi Bank, STC Bank, Saudi National Bank (SNB), Vision Bank,Visa, Tamara, Banque Saudi Fransi (BSF), Arab National Bank (ANB), Bank Al Jazira, SME Bank, Gulf International Bank (GIB), SAB, Alinma Bank, Social Development Bank, Enjaz (Albilad Bank), Abu Dhabi Islamic Bank (ADIB) and Economic Impact.

=== Recent editions ===
The 2025 U.S. edition, held in late October at The Venetian in Las Vegas, drew more than 11,000 attendees from 85 countries and featured over 630 speakers across more than 300 sessions, with programming centred on artificial intelligence, stablecoins, real-time payments and open finance; trade observers characterised it as a turning point at which the fintech industry shifted "from exploration to execution".

Money20/20 Europe 2025 ran 3–5 June at the RAI Amsterdam, gathering roughly 7,500 to 8,000 attendees from more than 2,200 companies around the theme "create the future". In its review, S&P Global Market Intelligence described the edition as one that "showcased the financial services industry balancing bold experiments with stubborn realities", with agentic AI, stablecoins and open banking dominating the agenda.

The 2026 Asia edition, held 21–23 April at the Queen Sirikit National Convention Center in Bangkok, set attendance records in its third year, with more than 4,500 attendees from around 90 countries — an increase of roughly 40% year on year — alongside over 360 speakers and a policy programme attended by more than 80 regulators. Reporting on the show, Thai newspaper The Nation said it had confirmed Bangkok as a centre of global financial innovation.

== Format and programme ==
Each Money20/20 event combines multi-track conference sessions, an exhibition floor and networking functions that emphasise deal-making. Themes typically cover payments infrastructure, banking innovation, regulation, cybersecurity, crypto-assets and artificial intelligence. The organiser reports that a substantial share of delegates hold C-suite roles, and that thousands of companies are represented at the U.S. show.

== Diversity and inclusion ==
Money20/20 launched the RiseUp accelerator in 2018 to address gender imbalance in fintech leadership, providing participants with mentorship, networking opportunities and visibility at its events.

The organiser has stated that it programmes a substantial proportion of women and people of colour among its speakers as part of this initiative. The approach received some criticism from commentators who argued that formal quotas risk tokenism, although event leadership has maintained that qualified speakers are plentiful.

== Reception ==
Industry media have generally characterised Money20/20 as a "must-attend" fintech gathering, praising its scale and networking value.

Critics have most often focused on the cost of attending and exhibiting. Full-access passes run to several thousand dollars, and trade coverage of the 2026 European edition observed that high ticket pricing had shifted the attendee mix heavily toward established enterprise platforms and well-capitalised firms, rather than the smaller startups present in earlier years. The show's scale and its influence on sector deal-flow nonetheless remain widely acknowledged.

== See also ==
- Money20/20 Middle East
- Singapore FinTech Festival
- Sibos
- Cannes Lions International Festival of Creativity
