= Jammaz Al-Suhaimi =

Jammaz bin Abdullah Al-Suhaimi
- جماز عبدالله السحيمي
- Born: Jammaz bin Abdullah Al-Suhaimi; 1945; Al-Quway'iyah, Riyadh, Saudi Arabia
- Died: 28 November 2017 (aged 71–72); Riyadh, Saudi Arabia
- Children: Sarah Al-Suhaimi

Jammaz bin Abdullah Al-Suhaimi (1945 - 28 November 2017) was a Saudi businessman and former chairman of the Capital Markets Authority of Saudi Arabia. His obituary in Euromoney described him as "a hugely influential and visionary figure in the development of the Saudi financial markets".

== Early life and education ==
Born in 1945 in Al-Quway'iyah, Riyadh. Jammaz Al-Suhaimi attended the King Saud University, where he earned a bachelor's degree in electrical engineering. He also received a bachelor's degree in electrical engineering from the University of Washington in Seattle.

== Career ==
Al-Suhaimi joined the Saudi Arabian Monetary Authority (SAMA) in 1984 as director-general for banking control, to become deputy governor of SAMA from 1989 to 2004.

In July 2004 he was appointed as the first secretary general of the Capital Markets Authority of Saudi Arabia (CMA). He served in the position until May 13, 2006, when he was replaced by Abdulrahman al-Tuwaijri.

Al-Suhaimi was the chairman of the Gulf International Bank from May 2008 until his death in November 2017. He was on the boards of directors of several organizations, such as the General Petroleum and Minerals Organization and the Saudi Arabian General Investment Authority.

Sarah Al-Suhaimi, his daughter, is the first Saudi woman to chair the Saudi Arabian stock exchange (Tadawul).
