= Steady =

Steady may refer to:

== Mathematics and science ==
- Steady state, a concept used in math and sciences where variables are time-constant
- Steady flow, a condition of flow that does not change with time

== People with the name ==
- Steady B (1969–present; stage name), an American hip hop emcee
- Steady Bongo (1966–2024; stage name), a Sierra Leonean musician and record producer
- "Steady" Ed Headrick (1924–2002; nickname), the father of the modern-day frisbee, creator of disc golf, and inventor of the metal cage disc golf targets
- Steady Eddie (1929–2004; nickname), an Australian professional snooker and billiards player
- Steady Eddy (1968–present; stage name), an Australian stand-up comedian and actor
- Steady Nelson (1913—1988; stage name), an American Jazz and Swing musician
- Brenda Steady, American politician

== Music ==
- Steady, a 2006 album by Jim Bianco
- Steady (album), a 2022 album by Sloan
- Steady (EP), a 2024 EP by NCT Wish
- "Steady", a 2018 song by Bebe Rexha featuring Tory Lanez from the album Expectations

== Other uses ==
- Steady, a European online payments company
- Steady web and mobile app
- Steady rest, a bearing used on a lathe
- HMS Steady, five ships with the name
- USS Steady (AM-118) (1942–1967), an Auk-class minesweeper reclassified to MSF-118 in 1955.

== See also ==
- Steady state (disambiguation)
- Unsteady (disambiguation)
