= Visor (disambiguation) =

A visor is a surface that protects the eyes.

Visor may also refer to:

- Visor (armor)
- VISOR, a fictional device in Star Trek media
- Violent and Sex Offender Register (ViSOR), a UK government database
- Bow visor, a feature of some ships, particularly ferries
- Visor, a PDA series made by Handspring
- The Visor, a rock ledge on the top of Half Dome in Yosemite National Park

== See also ==
- Advisor
- Vizor, Irish software company
