= Fahad Almubarak =

Saudi Arabian politician

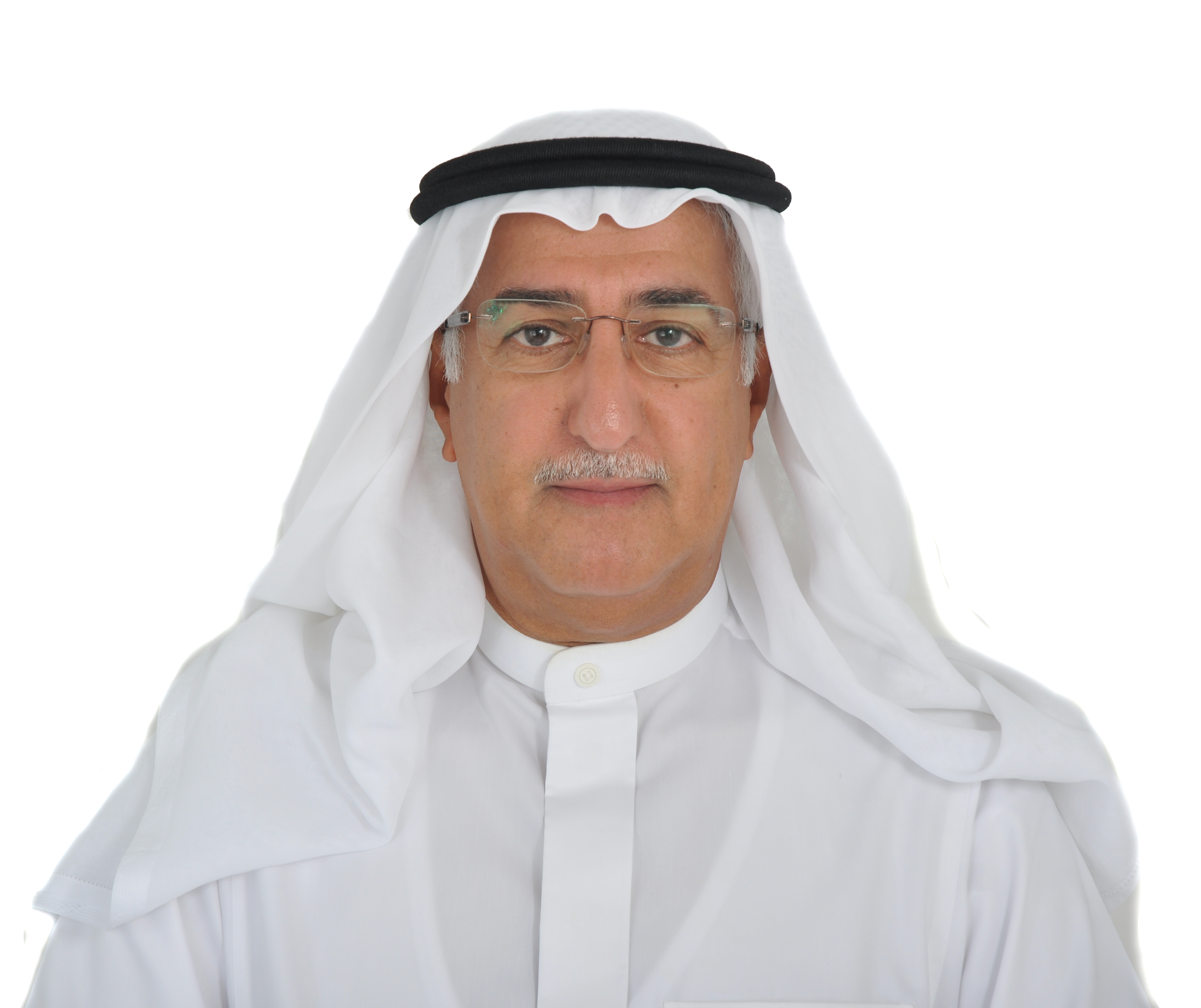

Chairman of the Saudi Central Bank
- Incumbent
- Assumed office 2021
- Preceded by: Ahmed Abdulkarim Alkholifey

Personal details
- Born: Fahad bin Abdullah bin Abdullatif Almubarak; 1955 (age 70–71) Saudi Arabia
- Education: Southern Methodist University (BS, MS); University of Houston (MS, MBA, PhD)

Fahad Almubarak is a Minister of State and Member of the Saudi Arabian Council of Ministers and the Saudi Arabia's G20 Sherpa since 2018. He has also been a Royal Court Advisor since 2015 and the Secretary-General of G20 Saudi Secretariat as well as Member of the SABIC Board of Directors' Investment Committee since 2017.

He is a prominent Saudi Arabian businessman who served as the governor of the Saudi Central Bank, the central bank of the Kingdom of Saudi Arabia, from December 2011 to May 2016. Prior to his role with the central bank, Almubarak was an entrepreneur, a businessman and an investment banker. In his capacity as the governor of the central bank, he oversaw the country's foreign reserves of around US$500 billion, regulated the banking and insurance sector, and strengthened the stability of the financial sector. During his term, Saudi Arabia maintained an investment-grade S&P credit rating of AA− with a stable outlook.

== Career ==
Almubarak founded The Capital Group (TCG), Saudi Arabia's first licensed investment bank and led it to become one of the country's leading investment banking firms advising on several IPOs, restructurings and mergers and acquisitions. The Capital Group was later acquired by Morgan Stanley and continued operating under Almubarak's leadership as Morgan Stanley Saudi Arabia. Almubarak was also a founding partner and board member at Amwal Al Khaleej, one of the Middle East's leading private equity firms. In 2013, Almubarak was named the 11th most powerful personality in the Arab world.

Additionally, he was a member of the negotiating team with international oil and gas companies towards the partial privatization of the natural gas industry in Saudi Arabia. Almubarak was also one of the key members of the committee responsible for the corporatization and had played a leading role in the privatization of Saudi Telecom Company and assisted in preparing privatization studies on the Saudi Postal Services.

He was also a founder and an executive partner at Malaz Group, a diversified investment firm based in Riyadh. He has 24 years of work experience and has worked in executive management positions providing investment and corporate finance advisory services.

From 1992 to 1999, Almubarak served as the CEO of Rana Investment Company where he launched and managed several private equity and alternative investment funds. During his incumbency, Almubarak steered Rana Investment Company from a local company to an internationally recognized investment company within a short span of time. He has also worked extensively on various regional projects in the Middle East.

Almubarak had also served for eight years on the Shoura Council, the country's consultative body during which he served as the vice chairman of its economic and energy committee. He is also a member of numerous national and regional economic and charitable committees.

== Memberships and boards ==
Fahad Almubarak served on a number boards of directors, including:

- Chairman of the Board of the Saudi Arabian Monetary Agency, Saudi Arabia's central bank
- Chairman of the Board of Tadawul, the Saudi stock exchange
- Member of the Board of Saudi Hollandi Bank
- Chairman of the Board of Morgan Stanley Saudi Arabia
- Chairman of the Anti-Money Laundering Permanent Committee in Saudi Arabia
- Member of the Board of Saudi Telecom Company
- Member of the Board of Etihad Etisalat (Mobily)
- Member of the Board of Amwal Al Khaleej
- Member of the Board of Majid Al Futtaim Group
- Member of the Board of Malaz Group
- Member of the Endowment's Board at King Fahd University of Petroleum and Minerals
- Member of the Board of Carrefour (Saudi Hypermarkets)
- Member of the Board of National Industrialization Company

== Education ==
Almubarak holds several academic degrees, including:

- Bachelor of Science Degree in Civil Engineering from Southern Methodist University
- Master's degree in Engineering Management from Southern Methodist University
- Master's degree in Business Administration (MBA) from the University of Houston
- Master's degree in Accountancy and Taxation from the University of Houston
- PhD degree in Business Administration from the University of Houston

== Personal life ==
Almubarak is married and has five children. He currently resides in Riyadh, Saudi Arabia.
