= Sadad =

Sadad may refer to:

- Sadad, Bahrain
- Sadad, Syria
- The SADAD payment system in Saudi Arabia
