= Rania Nashar =

Saudi businesswoman

- رانيا نشار
- Born: United States
- Education: King Saud University; University of Virginia Darden School of Business
- Years active: 1997–present
- Employers: Samba (1997–2020); Public Investment Fund (2020–present)

Rania Mahmoud Nashar (Arabic: رانيا محمود نشار) is a Saudi businesswoman. Born in the United States, she moved to Riyadh at an early age and studied at both King Saud University and University of Virginia Darden School of Business. She started working at Samba in 1997, eventually becoming its CEO, and the first female CEO of a Saudi commercial bank. She was subsequently included in the Forbes list of the World's 100 Most Powerful Women in 2019. In 2020, she resigned from her position at Samba to work at the Public Investment Fund.

== Early life and education ==
Rania Mahmoud Nashar was born in the United States, and moved to Riyadh, Saudi Arabia, shortly afterwards. Nashar graduated from King Saud University in 1997, majoring in computer science and information technology.

== Career ==
Nashar joined Samba in 1997 as a banker, while simultaneously studying at the University of Virginia Darden School of Business. She was in the company's board of directors in the bank's Pakistan and global branches. In February 2017, Nashar became the CEO of Samba, the first female Saudi CEO of a commercial bank. Her promotion came with country reforms to reduce gender inequality in the workforce. The following year, she was one of six Saudi women in the Forbes Middle East's Most Influential Women list and one of two Arab women in 2019 Forbes list of the World's 100 Most Powerful Women.

She was also a board member of the Institute of International Finance, and part of the Capital Market Authority's advisory committee. While in Samba, she helped its merge with United Saudi Bank, and worked on its transition to a fully Saudi corporation. She resigned from her position in December 2020, being succeeded by Mohammed bin Abdullah Al Sheikh, and later in the month, was appointed to the Public Investment Fund as an advisor to Yasir Al-Rumayyan.
