= Anwar Ali (banker) =

Pakistani origin economist (1913–1974)

Governor of the Saudi Arabian Monetary Agency
- In office 11 October 1958 – 5 November 1974
- Succeeded by: Abdulaziz Al Quraishi

Personal details
- Born: 1913
- Died: 5 November 1974 (aged 60–61) Washington D.C.
- Resting place: Medina, Saudi Arabia

Anwar Ali (1913–5 November 1974) was a Pakistani economist who was the third governor of the Saudi Arabian Monetary Agency. He headed the agency from 1958 to his death in 1974. Ali also held several positions at the ministry of finance in India and Pakistan and at the International Monetary Fund.

== Biography ==
Ali was born in 1913 in Dhaunkal Gujranwala into a Jovindah Muslim family.He received a master's degree in Lahore. He served as the undersecretary in the Ministry of Finance in India, deputy undersecretary in the Ministry of Finance in Pakistan and director of the National Bank in Pakistan.

Then Ali settled in the United States. He joined the International Monetary Fund (IMF) in 1954. Immediately after his employment he was named as the director of the Middle East department of the IMF. In this capacity he involved in the preparation of the budget of the Saudi government.

Ali left the IMF in 1958 and was appointed by Crown Prince and Prime Minister Faisal as the governor of the Saudi Arabian Monetary Agency on 11 October that year. Ali developed annual report systems and established the investment department of the agency. One of his deputies at the agency was Mohammed bin Faisal, a son of Crown Prince Faisal, from the late 1950s to August 1965. Ali was appointed a member of the Supreme Council on Petroleum in March 1973 when it was established by King Faisal. During the oil crisis the same year Ali reported that some senior Saudi princes did not support the oil embargo due to its potential harmful effects on Saudi Arabia.

Ali was married and the father of two, a daughter and a son. He had a heart attack in 1972. He died at age 61 during an official visit on 5 November 1974 in Washington D.C. following a heart attack in late October. There he met with the officials of the World Bank and the International Monetary Fund. Ali was buried in Medina, Saudi Arabia.

Ali's successor as governor of the Saudi Arabian Monetary Agency was Abdulaziz Al Quraishi, the first Saudi to head the agency.
