= Unsteady =

Unsteady may refer to:

- Unsteady flow, a condition of fluid mechanics that changes with time
- "Unsteady" (song), X Ambassadors 2015 song
- ”Unsteady”, a song by Gracie Abrams from the album Good Riddance (deluxe edition)

== See also ==
- Steady (disambiguation)
- Unstable (disambiguation)
