= Bank Albilad =

Financial institution in the Kingdom of Saudi Arabia

Bank Albilad بنك البلاد

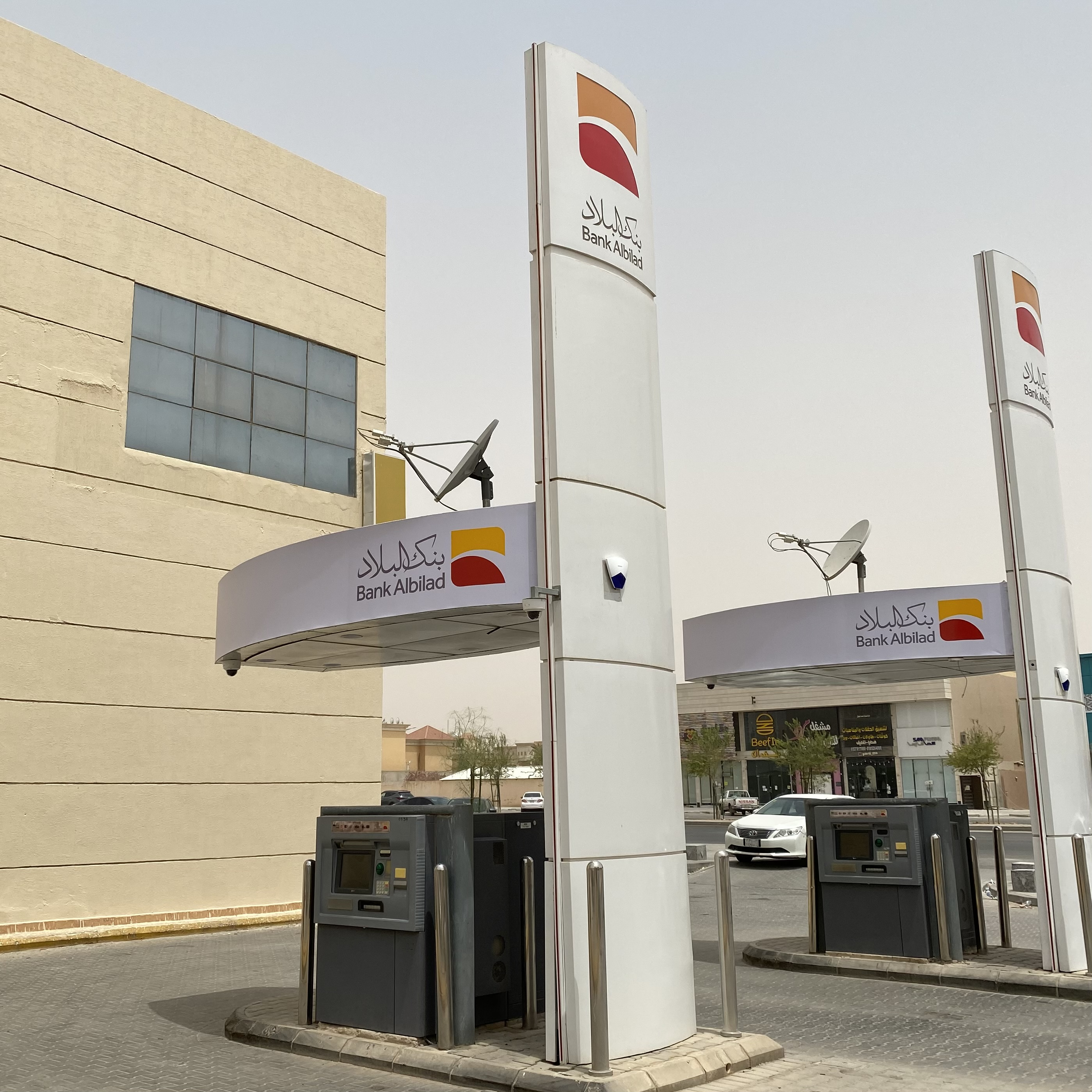
- Type: Public
- Traded as: Tadawul: 1140
- ISIN: SA000A0D9HK3
- Industry: Finance
- Founded: 4 November 2004; 21 years ago
- Headquarters: Riyadh, Saudi Arabia
- Key people: Nasser Mohammed Al-Subeaei (Chairman), Abdulaziz bin Mohammed Al-Onaizan (CEO)
- Products: Financial services
- Total assets: 86,075,431,000 Saudi riyal (2019)
- Number of employees: 2,300+
- Website: www.bankalbilad.com/en/

Bank Albilad (Arabic: بنك البلاد) is an Islamic Saudi bank established in 2004.

== History ==
The bank was established in 2004. The brothers Mohammed and Abdullah Ibrahim Al Subeaei are significant stakeholders.

In 2009, the bank renewed its entire inventory of ATM machines.

Bank Albilad is a Saudi joint stock company, headquartered in Riyadh. In May 2022 its shareholders approved an increase in capitalization to 10 billion Saudi Riyals through a 1-for-3 issue of shares.

Enjaz Banking Services, which was founded by Dr. Yousif Nimatallah, is the remittance department of Bank Albilad.

In February 2021, Nasser Mohammed Al-Subeaei was appointed chairman of the board of directors and Fahd Abdullah Bindekhayel as Vice Chairman.

Bank Albilad was ranked 16th on Forbes Middle East's 30 Most Valuable Banks 2025 list. It also ranked 38th on Forbes Middle East's Top 100 Listed Companies list.

== Services ==
Bank Albilad offers products and services complaint with sharia (Islamic) law. The bank provides retail banking products, business products, investment products through the bank investment arm “Albilad Capital ”, international remittance services through the bank Remittance Arm “Enjaz ”, founded by Dr. Yousif Nimatallah.

== Board of directors ==
- Nasser bin Mohammed Al-Subeaei. (Chairman of the Board of Directors)
- Adeeb Mohammed Abanumai. (Vice Chairman of the Board)
- Zeyad Othman Alhekail. (member)
- Abdulaziz Mohammed AlOnaizan. (member)
- Khalid Abdul Rahman AlRajhi. (member)
- Haitham Sulaiman AlSuhaimi. (member)
- Nasser Sulaiman Abdullah AlNasser (member)
- Mohammed Abdulrahman Abdulaziz AL Rajhi (member)
- Haitham Mohammad Abdulrhman Alfayez (member)
- Muadh Abdulrahman Hasan Alhusaini (member)

== Sharia Committee Members ==
- Sheikh Abdullah Al-Ammar
- Sheikh Mohammed Al-Osaimi
- Sheikh Yousef Al-Shubaily

== Objective ==
The stated objective of Bank Albilad is to provide all Islamic Sharia compliant banking services. The bank has, as part of its organizational structure, a Sharia Department to be in charge of the follow-up and monitoring of the implementation of the Sharia decisions issued by the Sharia Committee. The bank has worked on launching a number of projects to serve people with disabilities. The bank has rehabilitated a branch equipped with all the necessary capabilities to serve people with special needs, which enables people with motor, hearing, and visual disabilities to carry out all banking operations with complete ease. Dictionary of Bank Transactions in Sign Language In cooperation with specialists, the Bank has adopted a dictionary that contains terms of banking transactions in sign language to enable people with hearing disabilities to complete their transactions with confidence and ease. Adapting a number of the bank's automated teller machines around the Kingdom for the use of the blind, through the development of special software and guiding ground paths.

== See also ==
- List of banks in Saudi Arabia
