= Riyad Bank =

Financial institution in the Kingdom of Saudi Arabia

- Native name: بنك الرياض
- Type: Public (Tadawul: 1010)
- ISIN: SA0007879048
- Industry: Finance
- Founded: November 23, 1957; 68 years ago
- Headquarters: Riyadh, Saudi Arabia
- Key people: Abdullah Mohammed Al-Issa Chairman; Nadir S Al-Koraya CEO
- Products: Financial services
- Total assets: 265,788,878,000 Saudi riyal (2019)
- Number of employees: 5,973
- Website: www.riyadbank.com

Riyad Bank (Arabic: بنك الرياض) is one of the largest financial institutions in Saudi Arabia, ranked fourth in assets.

== History ==
It was established in 1957. The Saudi government owns 51% of the shares of the firm. In 2019 the Public Investment Fund owned about 22% of the bank.

Like other Saudi commercial banks, Riyad Bank is supervised by the Saudi Central Bank.

In June 2010, the homepage of the bank's website was hacked by hackers demanding the dismissal of the mayor of the province of Medina.

In July 2013, Riyad Bank chose Calypso for the management of its global cash flows.

In March 2018, Riyad Bank launched contactless payment wristbands, using the Gemalto digital security solution.

In December 2018, Riyad Bank went into preliminary discussions with National Commercial Bank (NCB), the country's biggest lender by assets, to study a merger plan. After three weeks Riyad Bank hired Goldman Sachs to advise on the merger that would create the largest bank in the kingdom with $182 billion in combined assets. In December 2019 the boards of both banks agreed to end the merger talks.

Nadir Al-Koraya succeeded Tareq Al-Sadhan as chief executive on 1 February 2024.

Riyad Bank was ranked ninth on Forbes Middle East's 30 Most Valuable Banks 2025 list. It was also ranked 16th on Forbes Middle East's Top 100 Listed Companies 2025 list.

In 2025 the bank reported a net profit of SAR 10.41 billion. Its total assets at the end of the year were SAR 519.48 billion.

== See also ==
- List of banks in Saudi Arabia
