= Saudi Parallel Market (Nomu) =

The Saudi Parallel Market (Nomu) (Arabic: السوق الموازية - نمو) is a parallel equity market in Saudi Arabia launched the Saudi Stock Exchange (Tadawul) on 26 February 2017 with lighter listing requirements. Nomu serves as an alternative platform for companies to be publicly listed. The aim of Nomu is to provide additional sources of funding for issuers as well as improving the capital market.

== Requirements ==
Listing in the Parallel Market requires a minimum market cap of SAR 10 million ($2.6 million), and at least 20% of the shares are owned by the public. Moreover, listing requires that at least 50 public shareholders are required at the time of listing.
