= Unstable (disambiguation) =

Unstable refers to a state of instability.

Unstable may also refer to:

- Unstable (Tetrarch album), 2021 album by Tetrarch
- Unstable (Adema album), 2003 album by Adema, or its title track
- "Unstable" (Justin Bieber song), a 2021 song by Justin Bieber featuring the Kid Laroi
- Unstable (Debian), the development distribution of the Debian operating system
- Unstable (Magic: The Gathering), a parody expansion of the Magic trading card game
- Unstable (TV series), a TV series starring Rob Lowe

== See also ==
- Unsteady (disambiguation)
- Stable (disambiguation)
