= Samba (bank) =

Financial group, formerly The Saudi American Bank

Samba Financial Group SJSC
- Trade name: SAMBA
- Formerly: The Saudi American Bank Samba Bank
- Type: Public
- Traded as: Tadawul: 1090
- ISIN: SA0007879097
- Industry: Financial services
- Founded: 12 February 1980; 46 years ago
- Defunct: 1 April 2021
- Fate: Merged with Saudi National Bank
- Headquarters: Riyadh, Saudi Arabia
- Number of locations: 72 Branch; 534 ATMs
- Key people: Ammar Abdulwahed Alkhudairy (Chairman); Rania Nashar (Managing Director and CEO)
- Operating income: 2,195,238 SAR (30 September 2019)
- Total assets: 237,341,834 SAR (30 September 2019)
- Total equity: 44,576,646 SAR (30 September 2019)
- Website: https://www.samba.com/en/personal-banking/index.aspx (defunct)

Samba Financial Group SJSC, formerly known as The Saudi American Bank, was a multinational banking firm based in Saudi Arabia. The combined institution had 66 branches in the Kingdom.

Samba merged with NCB to form Saudi National Bank on 1 April 2021.

== History ==
Samba was established on 12 February 1980 with the takeover of Citibank branches in Jeddah and Riyadh under a Saudi requirement that forced all foreign banks to be at least 60% owned by Saudi nationals. Citigroup entered a Technical Management Agreement under which it agreed to manage the new bank. The former Prime Minister of Pakistan, Shaukat Aziz, was the Managing Director of the bank in the 1990s.

Citibank opened its Jeddah branch in 1955, and its Riyadh branch in 1966. Citibank created Samba, in which it took a 40% share, to take over its branches in Saudi Arabia, under a Royal Decree on 12 February 1980. In 1985 Samba opened a branch in Istanbul that it closed after 1994, and at one point maintained a subsidiary in Geneva and a Representative office in Beirut. In the late 1980s, Samba opened a branch in London.

In July 1999, Samba merged with United Saudi Bank to form one of the largest banks in the Middle East. Before the merger, Citibank owned 30 percent of Samba, having sold a 10 percent tranche to two public agencies in 1991. After the merger, Citibank was still the largest shareholder with 23 percent of the shares. Kingdom Holding Company (owned by Prince Al-Waleed bin Talal) also had a large share ownership, deriving from his ownership in United Saudi Bank.

In 2003, the bank's name was officially changed to Samba Financial Group, and all references to Saudi American Bank were removed. This name change followed Citibank's decision to pull out of Saudi Arabia and sell its then 20% stake. Officially, this was done due to the anticipated relaxation of laws governing foreign banks' operations in the Kingdom. Some speculate that this was due to rising anti-American sentiment in Saudi Arabia. Nevertheless, SABB is still an HSBC partnership and they have changed their artwork and colors from green and white to the HSBC logo.

Samba Financial group was the first in the banking sector to simplify the process of transferring money overseas within hours. This was led by general manager Akhtar Aalam.

In 2004, Citibank sold its remaining stake in the company.

In March 2007, Samba Financial Group acquired 68% of Crescent Commercial Bank Limited (CCBL) in Pakistan. CCBL, established in 2002, was formerly known as Mashreq Bank Pakistan Limited, which in turn was the result of the merger in 2003 of Crescent Investment Bank Limited and the Pakistan branches of Mashreq Bank psc. CCBL is now named Samba Bank Pakistan. It currently operates 37 branches across Pakistan; the bank hopes to expand its network of branches in 2018.

In June 2008, Samba opened the first integrated branch in Dubai, UAE.

In 2010, Samba opened the first branch in Doha, Qatar.

In August 2011, Samba made the list of top ten safest banks 2011 in the Middle East ranked at number four.

In 2017, Rania Nashar was named CEO. This makes Samba the first listed Saudi commercial bank to have a female CEO.

In 2022, Samba merged into the National Commercial Bank, which established the largest bank in the Kingdom.

=== International operations ===
Its International Operations consist of a branch each in London, Doha, and Dubai, as well as a subsidiary that has 40 branches across major cities in Pakistan. The company dates back to 1955. After a partial nationalization program by the Saudi government, Citibank owned a 40% stake in the company in 1980 but sold its remaining interest in 2004.

== NCB Samba Deal ==
Samba and NCB carried out a mega-merger worth 15.3 billion dollars. The Merger resulted in the creation of Arabian Gulf's third largest bank after Qatar National Bank and First Abu Dhabi Bank. The new Saudi National Bank (SNB) company was formed in April 2021.

The previous Samba name and branding continue to be used outside of Saudi Arabia. Within Saudi Arabia, all Samba and NCB branding was switched to the new SNB branding.

== See also ==
- List of banks in Saudi Arabia
- List of banks in the Arab world
