= Steady (app) =

Online employment platform

- Release: 2018
- Operating system: iOS, Android, Web
- Website: steadyapp.com

Steady Platform, Inc.
- Type: Privately held company
- Founded: September 2017
- Founder: Adam Roseman, Michael Loeb, Eric Aroesty
- Headquarters: Atlanta, US
- Area served: United States
- Products: Online employment platform

Steady is a web and mobile application that lets users access a platform listing part-time, hourly and on-demand work opportunities. Listings are customized according to a user's geographical location and skills.

Steady Platform, Inc. was founded in 2017 in Atlanta. CEO Adam Roseman says he came up with the idea for the platform with co-founder Michael Loeb after analyzing statistics on the transition of full-time employees to part-time work. The Steady platform aims to help independent workers find new income streams and manage their earnings so they do not have to rely on high-interest credit, according to Roseman.

The company released its application in 2018. The application is available online, as well as on Apple's iOS and Google's Android platforms. Currently, Steady's platform only lists employers in the United States.

== Service ==
Steady can be accessed via the company's website or application. Web users are asked for their five-digit ZIP code and to fill out a brief survey. They are then connected to an online platform where they can view and sign up for various work opportunities. Companies listed on Steady's platform include Uber, Target and Instacart.

Steady includes an income tracker to help users monitor their different income streams and total monthly earnings. The application also offers discounts for registered application users at partnering pharmacies and retailers.

== History ==
Steady Platform Inc. was founded in June 2017 by Adam Roseman, Michael Loeb and Eric Aroesty. In a September 2018 interview with the Ready. Set. Work podcast, Roseman said the idea came after he and Loeb reviewed reports on the changing labor market and the millions of Americans with consumer debt. He said the company is “focused on helping individuals who either currently have more than one source of income or those who are requiring a second source of income for one reason or another.” Another inspiration, according to Roseman, was his 71-year-old father's efforts to keep living costs low and search for additional retirement income.

In September 2017, Steady received support from non-profit startup accelerator Fintech71. In October 2017, it won a competition the Startup Pitch at the Money20/20 conference in 2017 in Las Vegas receiving an award of $40,000.

In an interview with Money20/20, Roseman said the company's “focus is on delivering to what’s going to be more than half of the workers in the U.S., and the ability to create steady income for themselves.”

A beta version of the app was launched in April 2018 and the application has been downloaded by over 200,000 users.

== Investors ==
The company received seed funding from Michael Loeb in July 2017. Most recently, the company raised $9 million in Series A round funding in August 2018. Series A investors in the company include 25Madison, Abstract Ventures, Commerce Ventures, Propel Venture Partners, Clocktower Technology Ventures and Omidyar Network, an investment firm headed by billionaire and eBay founder Pierre Omidyar.

In August 2018, former basketball player Shaquille O’Neal also invested in Steady. O’Neal serves as an advisor and advocate for the company. At the 2018 Money 20/20 conference in Las Vegas, O’Neal discussed his investment with Steady. “Everybody wants to work,” he said. “And it shouldn’t be hard to do that.”
