= Electronic Securities Information System =

The Electronic Securities Information System (ESIS) was Saudi Arabia's stock exchange until it was replaced by Tadawul in 2001. ESIS was introduced in 1990 and administered by the Saudi Arabian Monetary Agency (SAMA).

== History ==
The electronic trading system is considered the second largest event in the history of the securities trading industry in the Kingdom after the decision to regulate trading in the market in 1984 and then bore the name (Electronic System for Stock Information), the implementation of the automated Saudi stock information system (ESIS) began gradually at the beginning of the second half of In 1990 AD, one of its most important effects on the market was that it abolished the market segmentation, and enabled the execution of dealers’ orders under clear and fair rules. It also provided accurate information about the prevailing offers and requests and the prices of previous deals, which contributed to improving the deal settlement mechanism. The system has been updated in Successive periods, the most recent of which was version No. (9), which entered into force in 1999, after that this system was replaced by the Tadawul system, which is still in operation.

== See also ==
- Tadawul
