= List of banks in Saudi Arabia =

In Saudi Arabia, a total of 39 banks are currently licensed by the Saudi Central Bank (SAMA): 11 local banks, 24 branches of foreign banks, and 4 digital banks.

== Local and Digital banks ==
According to the Saudi Central Bank (SAMA), the following are the licensed local and digital banks in Saudi Arabia:

#	Bank name (English)	Bank name (Arabic)	Headquarters	Founded	Stock code	Category
1	Saudi National Bank (SNB)	البنك الأهلي السعودي	Riyadh	1953	1180	Local Bank
2	Al Rajhi Bank	مصرف الراجحي	Riyadh	1957	1120	Local Bank
3	Riyad Bank	بنك الرياض	Riyadh	1957	1010	Local Bank
4	Saudi Awwal Bank (SAB)	البنك السعودي الأول	Riyadh	1978	1060	Local Bank
5	Arab National Bank (ANB)	البنك العربي الوطني	Riyadh	1979	1080	Local Bank
6	Alinma Bank	مصرف الإنماء	Riyadh	2006	1150	Local Bank
7	Banque Saudi Fransi (BSF)	البنك السعودي الفرنسي	Riyadh	1977	1050	Local Bank
8	The Saudi Investment Bank (SAIB)	البنك السعودي للاستثمار	Riyadh	1976	1030	Local Bank
9	Bank Albilad	بنك البلاد	Riyadh	2004	1140	Local Bank
10	Bank Aljazira	بنك الجزيرة	Jeddah	1975	1020	Local Bank
11	Gulf International Bank Saudi Arabia (GIB-SA)	بنك الخليج الدولي	Khobar	2017	—	Local Bank
12	D360 Bank	بنك دال ثلاثمائة وستون	Riyadh	2024	—	Digital Bank
13	STC Bank	بنك إس تي سي	Riyadh	2025	—	Digital Bank
14	Vision Bank	بنك فيجن	Riyadh	2025	—	Digital Bank
15	EZ Bank	آيزي بنك	—	—	—	Digital Bank (Not yet operational)

== Foreign banks ==
There are 24 foreign licensed banks in Saudi Arabia as of March 2026, which are:

Country	Bank
Bahrain	National Bank of Bahrain (NBB)
China	Bank of China Limited
China	Industrial and Commercial Bank of China (ICBC)
Egypt	Banque Misr
Egypt	National Bank of Egypt
France	BNP Paribas
Germany	Deutsche Bank
Indonesia	Bank Syariah Indonesia
Iraq	National Bank of Iraq
Iraq	Trade Bank of Iraq
Japan	MUFG Bank, Ltd.
Jordan	Bank of Jordan
Kuwait	National Bank of Kuwait (NBK)
Oman	Bank Muscat
Oman	Sohar International Bank
Pakistan	National Bank of Pakistan (NBP)
Qatar	Qatar National Bank (QNB)
Switzerland	UBS AG Bank (Previously Credit Suisse)
Turkey	Ziraat Bankası
United Arab Emirates	Abu Dhabi Commercial Bank (ADCB)
United Arab Emirates	Emirates NBD
United Arab Emirates	First Abu Dhabi Bank (FAB)
United Kingdom	Standard Chartered Bank
United States	J.P. Morgan Chase

== Digital banks ==
There are 4 licensed digital banks in Saudi Arabia as of November 2025, which are:

- D360 Bank commenced operations in December 2024.
- STC Bank commenced operations in January 2025.
- Vision Bank commenced operations in September 2025.
- EZ Bank received its license in September 2025 but, as of November 2025, has not yet commenced operations.

== See also ==
- List of companies of Saudi Arabia
- Public Investment Fund
