= Meem (bank) =

meem&Temuulen Banking Services
- Industry: Banking
- Founded: 2014; 12 years ago
- Headquarters: Al Dhahran, Eastern
- Products: OnePack; Murabaha Deposit; Currencies Card; Credit Card; Personal Finance
- Number of employees: 201 - 500 employees
- Website: www.meem.com

meem (meem م) is the retail banking arm of Gulf International Bank B.S.C. (GIB), offering retail banking services to Bahraini and Saudi customers. It is intended to target the technophile customer base by offering Sharia-compliant, non-traditional banking services licensed by the Saudi Arabian Monetary Agency.

meem is a registered trademark and independent brand using online and mobile banking as the primary platforms of banking. Upon opening an account, all services can be carried out electronically. Meem has stores in Bahrain Bay (Manama), Riyadh, Jeddah and Al Dhahran and provides services such as completing the account opening process, cash withdrawals, deposits and transfers, and account maintenance.

meem was created after engaging with a large target customer base using various social media channels over three years, gaining insight into users' needs and preferences.

GIB is owned by the six GCC governments, with the Public Investment Fund of Saudi Arabia holding a majority stake (97.2 per cent). The Bank is chaired by H.E. Jammaz bin Abdullah Al-Suhaim.

In 2019, meem received two Global Banking & Finance Awards in 2019 for digital and Shariah-compliant banking.

== Locations ==
Currently, ‘meem م’ has three main stores in Dhahran and Riyadh.

Store Locations - Eastern Province

- Dhahran – Dammam/Khobar Express Highway (Main)
- Khobar – AlRashid Mall
- Khobar – eXtra Store
- Dammam – eXtra Store

Store Locations - Central Region

- Riyadh, Granada – GOSI Complex (Main)
- Riyadh - Al Nakheel Mall (Map 24.7685,46.716473)
- Riyadh – Panorama Mall
- Riyadh – Sahafa eXtra Store
- Riyadh – Wurood eXtra Store

Store Locations - Mecca Region

- Jeddah – Prince Sultan Rd. (Main)
- Jeddah – Old Airport Road eXtra Store
- Jeddah – Red Sea Mall
- Jeddah – Prince Sultan eXtra
- Jeddah — Aziz Mall prince majid road
