= D360 Bank =

Saudi digital Islamic bank

- Native name: D360 Bank
- Type: Private joint-stock company
- Industry: Digital banking services
- Founded: 15 February 2022
- Founder: Investment consortium led by Derayah Financial Company, Public Investment Fund and other strategic investors
- Headquarters: Riyadh, Saudi Arabia
- Area served: Saudi Arabia
- Key people: Eze Szafir (Chief Executive Officer)
- Products: Digital bank accounts, personal financing, domestic and international money transfers, savings accounts, and banking services for individuals and Banking as a Service
- Owner: Public Investment Fund, Derayah Financial Company, and other investors
- Website: https://d360.com

D360 Bank is a Saudi digital bank that provides Sharia compliant digital banking services. It is considered the first digital bank in Saudi Arabia to officially commence full banking operations. Founded with a paid up capital of SAR 1.65 billion, the bank later increased its capital to SAR 2.1 billion to support its expansion and growth plans. The Bank is owned by an investment consortium led by Derayah Financial Company, with the participation of the Public Investment Fund and several strategic investors.

== History ==
On 15 February 2022, the Saudi Council of Ministers, chaired by King Salman bin Abdulaziz Al Saud, approved authorizing the Minister of Finance to issue the necessary license for Bank D360, in accordance with Article Three of the Banking Control Law issued by Royal Decree No. (M/5) dated 22/2/1386 AH. In December 2024, the Saudi Central Bank (SAMA) announced that it had granted D360 Bank a no-objection to commence its banking operations in the Kingdom, making it the first digital bank to begin actual operations in Saudi Arabia.

== Establishment and licensing ==
The bank was initially established with a capital of SAR 1.65 billion through an investment consortium led by Derayah Financial Company, the Public Investment Fund, and several strategic investors. The capital was later increased to SAR 2.1 billion to support growth and expansion plans. In 2025, the number of D360 Bank customers surpassed two million, reflecting the bank's continued growth as one of the leading digital banks in Saudi Arabia.

== Regulation and supervision ==
D360 Bank operates under the supervision and regulation of the SAMA and is subject to the banking laws and regulations in force in Saudi Arabia. The bank is structured as a closed joint-stock company, focusing on expanding digital financial services and strengthening its digital banking capabilities. Its services aim to support individuals, entrepreneurs, and small and medium sized enterprises in achieving their financial objectives. The bank’s activities align with the objectives of Saudi Vision 2030 and the Financial Sector Development Program by promoting digital innovation and enhancing financial inclusion.

== Ownership ==
The bank’s ownership structure consists of an investment consortium that includes the Public Investment Fund, Derayah Financial Company, and a number of local individual and corporate investors.
