= Zakat, Tax and Customs Authority =

Government Agency in Saudi Arabia

The General Authority of Zakat, Tax, and Customs (ZATCA)
- هيئة الزكاة والضريبة والجمارك

Agency overview
- Formed: June 14, 1951; 75 years ago
- Jurisdiction: Government of Saudi Arabia
- Agency executive: Suhail Abnami, Governor
- Parent department: Ministry of Finance
- Website: zatca.gov.sa/en/

The General Authority of Zakat, Tax, and Customs (ZATCA; Arabic: هيئة الزكاة والضريبة والجمارك) is a government agency under the Ministry of Finance in Saudi Arabia that is responsible for the assessment and collection of taxes and zakat, a form of obligatory almsgiving in Islam. ZATCA was established on 14 June 1951 as department under the Ministry of Finance.

ZATCA is headquartered in Riyadh and consists of the Taxpayer Department and 19 branches distributed over the main cities in the country.
