= Steady state (disambiguation) =

Steady state may refer to:

- Steady state (systems) an operating condition in thermodynamic and other systems or processes when variables stay constant as time passes.
  - Steady-state economy, an economy made up of a constant population size and a constant stock of physical wealth (capital).
  - Steady-state equilibrium (monetary theory), an economic situation where neutrality of money coincides with zero population growth.
  - Steady-state rate of growth (neoclassical growth theory), an economy featuring an equi-proportionate increase in capital and labour
  - Steady state (electronics), a state existing in a circuit or network when all transients have died away.
  - Steady state (chemistry), a term in chemical kinetics meaning the situation in which all state variables of an open system are constant in time.
  - Steady state (biochemistry), a situation in which certain parameters of cells or organs, usually concentrations of molecules, are constant in time
  - Steady state (physiology), also known as homeostasis, a system in which a particular variable is not changing but energy must be continuously added to maintain this variable constant.
- Dynamic equilibrium commonly observed in dynamical systems.

The Steady State advocacy group active in U.S. politics made up of former senior national security officials.

It may also refer to:

- Steady-state model, a non-standard cosmological view developed in 1949 by Fred Hoyle and others as an alternative to the Big Bang theory.
- Steady state engine test stand, a type of application for engine testing.
- Microsoft Windows SteadyState, an imaging program for Microsoft operating systems.
