= Banque Saudi Fransi =

Saudi Arabian bank

BSF البنك السعودي الفرنسي
- Trade name: Banque Saudi Fransi, BSFR
- Native name: البنك السعودي الفرنسي
- Formerly: Banque Saudi Fransi
- Company type: Public
- Traded as: Tadawul: 1050
- ISIN: SA0007879782
- Industry: Finance services
- Founded: June 4, 1977; 49 years ago
- Headquarters: Riyadh, Saudi Arabia
- Key people: Mazin Abdulrazzak AlRomaih (Chairman); Bader Hamad Al Sallom (CEO) (2022)
- Net income: ▲SARSAR 4.2 billion (2023)
- Total assets: 253,382,849 (2023)
- Number of employees: 3,081 (2024)
- Subsidiaries: BSF JANA BSF Capital JB
- Website: bsf.sa

Banque Saudi Fransi (BSF; Arabic: البنك السعودي الفرنسي) is a Saudi Arabian bank established by Royal Decree No. M/23 dated June 1977.

BSF has a banking network of about 83 Full-Fledged branches, 4 ladies section, 563 ATM's and 45031 POS across the Saudi Kingdom and employs over 3,000 staff. The bank's head office is located in Riyadh and the company has three Regional Head offices in Jeddah, Dammam, Abha.

As of 2023 financial report, Banque Saudi Fransi had total assets of 253 Billion SAR and total liabilities of 212 Billion SAR

On May 2, 2024 Banque Saudi Fransi Launched its new identity with a new logo, name initialised from Banque Saudi Fransi to BSF, color changed, new website, and new app.

== Services ==
Banque Saudi Fransi offers financial services in private banking, corporate baking and personal banking, including Islamic banking in accordance with the Islamic Sharia principles (Arabic: مبادىء الشريعة الإسلامية). The bank also provides investment services such as asset management and investment funds, in addition to providing brokerage services through subsidiary BSF Capital. The bank also provides car leasing services and several other Shariah-compliant financing solutions for private individuals and businesses in the kingdom through JB (Arabic:جيبي ). In addition, the bank Also Provides Insurance Services to Individuals. The bank also has special ladies banking services with their own Branches around the kingdom and for individuals they provide services through Branches, FransiPlus, FransiMobile, BSF Phone (Telephone Banking), BSF ATM, BSF Send (Instant Transfer Via Western Union), BSF self-service machines, and branches Where you can print documents, issue and replace cards, transfer money, pay bills, update information and more. BSF also has a loyalty rewards program known as BSF Jana where you can earn points for using credit card, bill payments, loans or digital banking services BSF issues MADA, Visa and Mastercard debit and credit Cards They also have Different Types of cards including miles credit card in partnership with Saudia Airlines, which allows the user to earn Al Fursan miles on every purchase. Their cards work with Mada Pay and Apple Pay. BSF has 4 banking programs for individuals classic banking, advance banking, privilege banking, and elite banking.

== History ==
Banque Saudi Fransi was established in accordance with the Royal Decree No. m. 32 dd 17 Jumada II 1397H 4 June 1977. Following the transfer of Banque de l'Indochine et de Suez operations in Saudi Arabia, Banque Saudi Fransi officially commenced its operations on 5 September 1989, under CR No. 1010073368 issued on 5 September 1989.

In 2012 they launched The Saudi Fransi Lease Finance Company - a subsidiary of Banque Saudi Fransi that provides digital financial solutions.

In June 2012 Fitch Ratings has affirmed Banque Saudi Fransi's (BSF) long-term issuer default rating (IDR) at 'A' with a stable outlook and short-term IDR at 'F1'.

The bank was affiliated with Crédit Agricole Corporate and Investment Bank (2015).

In January 2017 They launched their loyalty rewards program known as Jana (Arabic: جنى ) and later in May they Launched the App for IOS and Android.

In May 2017 BSF launched a dedicated ladies banking services with its own identity and branding known as Antee (Arabic: أنتِ).

In 2020 Crédit Agricole ended its affiliation with BSF and announced the disposal of its remaining 4.0% stake in Banque Saudi Fransi.

In March 2022 BSF and Saudi Arabian Airlines signed a memorandum of understanding and later launched Saudia-branded miles credit card.

In December 2023 BSF launched a new identity for The Saudi Fransi Lease Finance Company known as JB (Arabic:جيبي ).

In May 2024 Banque Saudi Fransi launched it new identity and brand.

BSF was ranked 19th on Forbes Middle East's 30 Most Valuable Banks 2025 list. It also ranked 28th on Forbes Middle East's Top 100 Listed Companies 2025 list.

== See also ==
- Crédit Agricole Corporate and Investment Bank
- List of companies of Saudi Arabia
- List of banks in Saudi Arabia
