= Vizor =

- Industry: Regulatory software
- Founded: 2000
- Founders: Ross Kelly; Conor Crowley
- Headquarters: Dublin; Ottawa; Dubai
- Website: www.vizorsoftware.com

Vizor is an Irish software company that creates regulatory software for central banks, tax authorities, pension and insurance regulators, and other regulatory authorities.

== History ==
Vizor was founded in 2000 by Ross Kelly and Conor Crowley in Sandyford, Dublin. The founders served as co-chief executives of the company, and Crowley became sole CEO in 2018. As of 2015 Vizor had developed regulatory software for more than twenty countries, and had offices in Dublin, Dubai, and Ottawa.

In 2021, BearingPoint RegTech acquired Vizor.

== Software ==
Vizor develops regulatory software that is used by national regulatory bodies and facilitates cross-border information exchange for tax authorities. Vizor's work includes developing the regulatory software used by central banks including the Bank of Canada, the Bank of England, the Monetary Authority of Brunei Darussalam, and the Saudi Arabian Monetary Authority. They have also developed regulatory software for the administration of national pension schemes, and in 2018 devised the software for the tax authority of The Bahamas. In 2019 Vizor began developing regulatory software for the Australian Prudential Regulation Authority, which will be introduced for use in 2020.
