= Bank Aljazira =

Saudi Arabian financial group

Aljazira Bank
- Native name: بنك الجزيرة
- Company type: Public (Tadawul: 1020)
- ISIN: SA0007879055
- Industry: Finance
- Founded: June 21, 1975; 50 years ago
- Headquarters: Jeddah, Saudi Arabia
- Products: Financial services
- Total assets: 86,544,344,000 Saudi riyal (2019)
- Website: www.aljazirabank.com.sa

Aljazira Bank (Arabic: بنك الجزيرة) is a Saudi Arabian financial group and a joint-stock company founded in 1975 headquartered in Jeddah.

== Overview ==
Aljazira Bank was established as a Saudi joint-stock company registered under Royal Decree No. 46/M issued on June 21, 1975. The bank began its operations on October 9, 1976, after it acquired the branches of the National Bank of Pakistan in the Kingdom of Saudi Arabia. In 2010, the foundations were laid for future growth and diversification of the bank's products and services, which contributed to the diversification of income sources away from the risks of relying on one or two sources of income.

Bank AlJazira was ranked 24th on Forbes Middle East's 30 Most Valuable Banks 2025 list.

== See also ==
- List of banks in Saudi Arabia
- List of companies of Saudi Arabia
