= Saudi Central Bank =

Central bank of the Kingdom of Saudi Arabia

Saudi Central Bank البنك المركزي السعودي
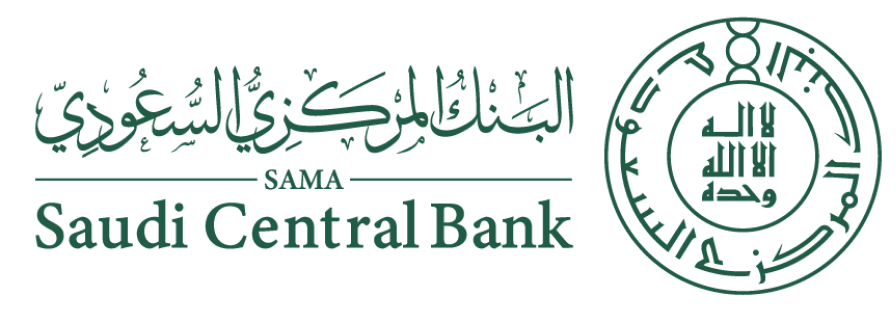

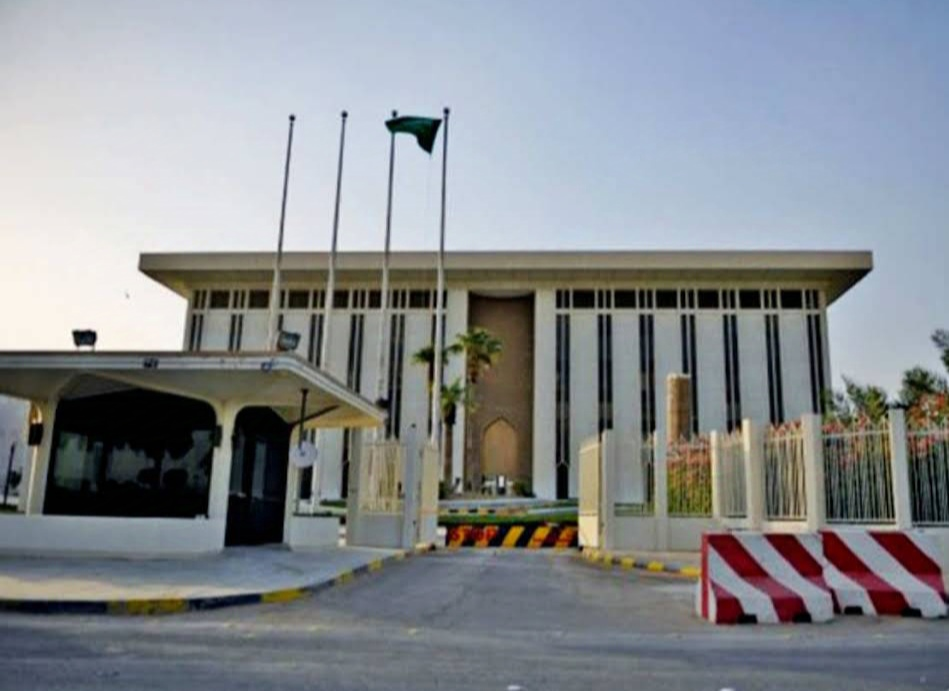
- Central bank of: Saudi Arabia
- Headquarters: Riyadh, Saudi Arabia
- Coordinates: 24.6643°N 46.6871°E
- Established: 4 October 1952; 74 years ago
- Ownership: 100% state ownership
- Governor: Ayman Al-Sayari
- Currency: Saudi riyal SAR (ISO 4217)
- Reserves: $603.9 billion
- Preceded by: Saudi Arabian Monetary Authority
- Website: sama.gov.sa

The Saudi Central Bank (Arabic: البنك المركزي السعودي) is the central bank of the Kingdom of Saudi Arabia. It was established in 1952 and known as the Saudi Arabian Monetary Authority (SAMA) until 2020. Despite the 2020 name change, it has continued to use the same acronym SAMA.

== History ==
Prior to the establishment of the Saudi Central Bank, the Saudi Hollandi Bank, a branch of the Netherlands Trading Society from 1926 acted as a de facto central bank. It kept the Kingdom's gold reserves and received oil revenues on behalf of the Saudi Arabian government. In 1928 it assisted in the establishment of a new Saudi silver coin, commissioned by King Abdulaziz which became the Kingdom's first independent currency. The Saudi Hollandia Bank handed over its responsibilities to the SAMA when it was established in 1952 and became a model for other foreign banks in the kingdom.

SAMA relocated in 1984 from Jeddah to Riyadh. The institution's new head office building was designed by American architect Minoru Yamasaki and completed in 1985.

The modern central bank operates through regulatory infrastructure developed by Irish firm Vizor. In March 2020 and April 2020, SAMA moved 150 billion Saudi riyals (US$40 billion) to the Public Investment Fund (PIF). US$25 billion was transferred in April and US$15 billion in May.

== Functions ==
SAMA is the Central Bank of Saudi Arabia, the functions of the SAMA include issuing the national currency, the Saudi Riyal, supervising commercial banks, managing foreign exchange reserves, promoting price and exchange rate stability, and ensuring the growth and soundness of the financial system, operating a number of cross-bank electronic financial systems such as MADA (previously SPAN), SARIE, and SADAD.

== List of governors ==
| Name | Tenure |
|---|---|
| Ayman Mohammed Alsayari | Since 2023 |
| Fahad Almubarak | 2021–2023 |
| Ahmed Abdulkarim Alkholifey | 2016-2021 |
| Fahad Almubarak | 2011–2016 |
| Muhammad Al Jasser | 2009–2011 |
| Hamad Ibn Saud Al Sayari | 1983–2009 |
| Abdul Aziz Al Quraishi | 1974–1983 |
| Anwar Ali | 1958–1974 |
| Ralph Standish | 1954–1958 |
| George A. Blowers | 1952–1954 |

== Leadership and structure ==
A board of directors oversees the operations of SAMA. This comprises the governor, vice-governor and three other nominated members from the private sector. The terms of appointment are 4 years for the governor and vice-governor, extendable by Royal decree, and 5 years for the other members, also extendable by Royal decree. Members of the board cannot be removed except by Royal decree.

The SAMA senior management comprises the governor, the vice-governor and five deputy governors.

=== Board of directors ===
| Name | Position |
|---|---|
| Governor, Dr. Ahmed Abdulkarim Alkholifey | Chairman |
| Vice Governor, Abdulaziz Salih Alfuraih | Vice Chairman |
| Hamad S. Al Sayari | |
| Muhammad Obaid bin Sa’eed bin Zagar | |
| Abdulaziz bin Muhammad Al Athel | |

=== Senior Management ===
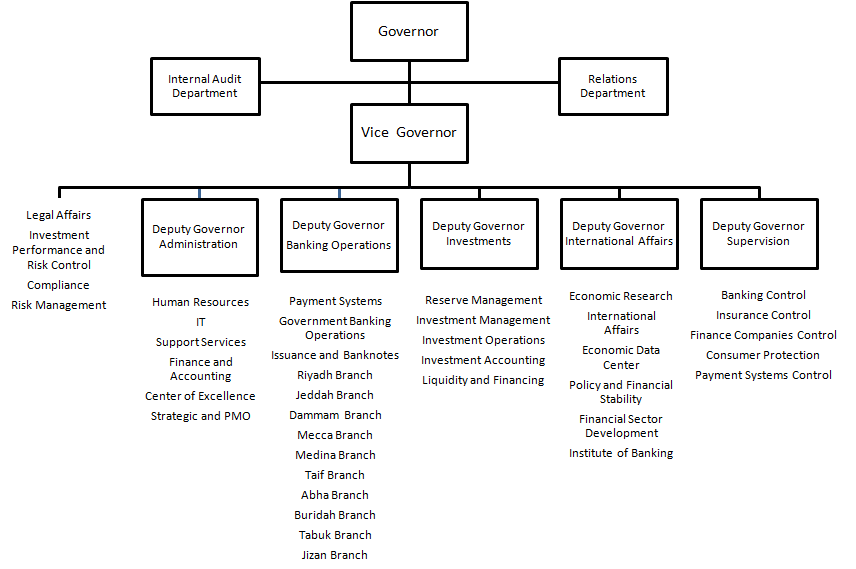
Organisational structure of SAMA as at May 2013.

| Name | Position | Date of appointment |
|---|---|---|
| Ayman Mohammed Alsayari | Governor | 4 February 2023 |
| Khaled Walid-Dhaher | Vice Governor for Supervision & Technology | 4 July 2022 |
| Ziad Bander Alyousef | Deputy Governor for Development & Technology | N/A |
| Yazeed Ahmed AlSheikh | Deputy Governor for Supervision | N/A |
| Dr. Fahad Ibrahim Alshathri | Deputy Governor for Research And International Affairs | N/A |
| Talal Fouad Alhumoud | Deputy Governor for Investment | N/A |

== Balance sheet ==
The SAMA balance sheet is denominated in Saudi Riyals, which is pegged at an official rate of 3.75 against the US dollar. All currency notes issued by SAMA are fully backed by equivalent gold deposits.

(Millions of Saudi Riyals)

| | 2007 | 2008 | 2009 | 2010 | 2011 | 2012* |
|---|---|---|---|---|---|---|
Liabilities
| Notes Issued | | | | | | |
| Government Deposits | 514,123 | | 933,912 | 1,008,251 | 1,203,477 | 1,299,676 |
| Commercial Banks' Deposits | 36,277 | 44,698 | 50,715 | 54,976 | 63,511 | 68,011 |
| Foreign entities' Riyal Deposits | 14,939 | 12,488 | 10,300 | 10,310 | 3,774 | 3,750 |
| Other liabilities | 525,424 | 479,406 | 452,599 | 495,823 | 618,069 | 617,698 |
| Total | 1,196,816 | 1,709,995 | 1,570,653 | 1,705,389 | 2,057,864 | 2,154,065 |
Assets
| Currency cover (gold) | 106,054 | 121,066 | 123,127 | 136,029 | 169,033 | 164,930 |
| Cash in vault | 23,842 | 27,053 | 23,876 | 25,060 | 29,187 | 24,171 |
| Deposits with banks abroad | 246,792 | 379,487 | 335,673 | 343,887 | 414,007 | 495,246 |
| Investments in foreign securities | 790,559 | 1,154,247 | 1,071,542 | 1,181,916 | 1,427,820 | 1,446,610 |
| Other assets | 29,569 | 28,142 | 16,435 | 18,497 | 17,817 | 23,108 |
| Total | 1,196,816 | 1,709,995 | 1,570,653 | 1,705,389 | 2,057,864 | 2,154,065 |

2012 figures are at end of 1st quarter.

== SAMA Foreign Holdings ==
In addition to its functions, the Saudi Central Bank controls SAMA Foreign Holdings, the sovereign wealth fund of Saudi Arabia. The fund is the third largest sovereign wealth fund in the world, with assets of over $700 billion.

In October 2015, Governor Fahad Abdullah Al-Mubarak of the Saudi Central Bank was ranked #2 on the Public Investor 100.

== See also ==
- Capital Market Authority (Saudi Arabia)
- Electronic Securities Information System
- List of banks in Saudi Arabia
- SADAD
- Saudi Payments Network (SPAN)
- Saudi riyal
- Tadawul
- List of central banks
- List of financial supervisory authorities by country
