= Alinma Bank =

Saudi Arabian private bank

Alinma Bank مصرف الإنماء
- Type: Private
- Traded as: Tadawul: 1150
- ISIN: SA122050HV19
- Industry: Finance
- Founded: March 23, 2006; 20 years ago
- Headquarters: Riyadh, Saudi Arabia
- Key people: Abdulmalek bin Abdullah bin Hamad Al-Hogail, Chairman
- Products: Islamic financial services
- Total assets: 131,839,441,000 Saudi riyal (2019)
- Owner: Public Investment Fund-10%, General Organization for Social Insurance-10%, Public Pension Agency-10%, public shares-70%
- Number of employees: 2,658 (2018)
- Website: www.alinma.com/en/

Alinma Bank (Arabic: مصرف الإنماء) is a Saudi joint stock company formed in accordance with Royal Decree No. M/15 dated 28 March 2006 and Ministerial Resolution No. 42 dated 27 March 2007. The bank was established with share capital of SAR 20 billion, consisting of 1.5 billion shares with a nominal value of SAR 10 per share. The company has more than 2,658 employees. The name translates to "growth" or "development" in Arabic.

Alinma Bank was ranked 10th on Forbes Middle East's 30 Most Valuable Banks 2025 list. It also ranked 25th on Forbes Middle East's Top 100 Listed Companies 2025 list.

== Ownership structure ==
Alinma Bank’s founding shareholders are as follows: The Saudi Arabian Public Investment Fund (PIF), the Saudi Arabian Public Pension Agency (PPA) and the Saudi Arabian General Organization for Social Insurance (GOSI). Together they represent 30% of the bank’s share capital, all with equal shares. The remaining 70% of the bank’s shares were offered for public subscription in April 2008.

== Bank activities ==
Alinma provides a comprehensive range of Shariah-compliant retail and corporate banking and investment services. The bank serves its clients through a nationwide network of branches and ATMs, as well as through its alternative channels, Alinma Internet, Alinma Phone, Alinma Mobile and the Alinma App for smart devices.

== Location ==
The Alinma head office is located in Al-Anoud Tower on King Fahad Highway in the Saudi capital, Riyadh.

== See also ==
- List of banks in Saudi Arabia
