= Saudi National Bank =

Saudi Arabian Bank

Saudi National Bank البنك الأهلي السعودي
- Type: Public
- Traded as: Tadawul: 1180
- ISIN: SA13L050IE10
- Industry: Finance
- Founded: 26 December 1953; 72 years ago (as The National Commercial Bank); 1 April 2021; 5 years ago (via the merger of National Commercial Bank & Samba Financial Group)
- Headquarters: Riyadh, Saudi Arabia
- Number of locations: 502 Branches (2021); 3,770 ATM's (2019)
- Key people: Saeed Mohammed Al-Ghamdi (Chairman); Tareq Abdulrahman Al Sadhan (Chief Executive Officer)
- Products: Financial services
- Total assets: US$273.9 billion (2022)
- Number of employees: 13,058 (2021)
- Website: SNB Website

Saudi National Bank (SNB; Arabic: البنك الأهلي السعودي), also known as SNB AlAhli, formerly known as National Commercial Bank, is the largest commercial bank in Saudi Arabia.

In April 2021, National Commercial Bank merged with Samba Financial Group under the name of Saudi National Bank.

On 27 March 2023, Ammar Abdul Wahed Al Khudairy resigned as the bank's chairman citing personal reasons, two weeks after Al Khudairy stated that SNB would not be acquiring more shares in troubled Swiss bank Credit Suisse due to regulatory constraints, which caused more panic among investors.

SNB was ranked third on Forbes Middle East's Top 100 Lists Companies 2025 list. It was also ranked second on Forbes Middle East's 30 Most Valuable Banks 2025 list.

== SNB Group ==
The Saudi National Bank “SNB Group” “Arabic: البنك الأهلي السعودي” is a Saudi bank headquartered in Riyadh, the capital city of Saudi Arabia. The bank was founded in December 1953 under the name of the National Commercial Bank “NCB”. In 2021, SNB has emerged as a banking champion after completing one of the largest mergers in the region between the National Commercial Bank and Samba Financial Group. Currently, SNB has subsidiaries and affiliates operating in 8 countries around the world.

The Saudi National Bank is mainly owned by the Saudi Government represented by the Public Investment Fund and the General Organization for Social Insurance (GOSI).

Being the largest financial group in Saudi Arabia and one of the largest powerhouses in the region, SNB plays a vital role in supporting economic transformation in Saudi Arabia by transforming the local banking sector and catalyzing the delivery of Saudi Arabia’s Vision 2030. SNB strategy is closely aligned with the Saudi Vision programs, levering on its position as the largest institutional and specialized financier in the Kingdom to support the Kingdom’s landmark deals and mega projects.

SNB balance sheet, business model, and liquidity position help the Bank’s local and regional capabilities, and to facilitate trade and capital flows between the Kingdom and regional and global markets.

== Ownership and legal constitution ==
The bank was constituted as a general partnership from its founding in 1953 until 1 July 1997, when it was reconstituted as a joint stock company.

In 1999, the Government of Saudi Arabia acquired a majority holding in the bank through the Ministry of Finance's Public Investment Fund (PIF).

In an extraordinary general assembly meeting held on 21 March 2014, the shareholders approved to offer 25% of the bank's share capital (after capital increase) to the public under the initial public offering (IPO) and to a minority shareholder of the bank. The IPO was made for 15% of the bank's share capital, and an additional 10% was allocated to the Public Pension Agency. The shares offered were part of the shareholding of a majority shareholder of the bank. The IPO was approved by the regulatory authorities and the subscription for the IPO took place between 19 October 2014 and 2 November 2014, and the Bank's shares have been trading on Saudi Stock Exchange (Tadawul) since 12 November 2014.

== SNB Management ==
Chairman: Saeed Mohammed Al-Ghamdi
CEO: Tareq Abdulrahman Al Sadhan
CEO, SNB Capital: Rashed I. Sharif
Group CFO: Ahmad Ali Al Dhabi

== NCB Samba Deal ==
Samba Financial Group and NCB planned a mega-merger worth US$15.3 billion. The merger would result in the creation of Arabian Gulf's third-largest bank after Qatar National Bank and First Abu Dhabi Bank.

== Investments ==
Saudi National Bank previously held a 9.8% stake in the Credit Suisse Group. Later statements indicate this had been increased to the maximum authorised amount of 9.9% and a statement issued on this matter, at the time “material weaknesses” were identified by auditors in Credit Suisse accounts, contributed to climate which resulted in CS being bought at a steep discount by its rival UBS and despite receiving a massive credit line by the Swiss National Bank. This will have resulted (subject to any hedging) in a large loss write down in value of investments owned by the Saudi National Bank. They will have gained a much smaller participation in the new post-merger UBS bank.

== See also ==
- List of banks in Saudi Arabia
