= Saudi Exchange =

Stock market index located in Saudi Arabia

- Tadāwul
- Type: Stock exchange
- Location: Riyadh, Saudi Arabia
- Coordinates: 24°41′12.89″N 46°41′7.70″E
- Founded: 19 March 2007
- Owner: Saudi Tadawul Group (Tadawul: 1111)
- Key people: Khalid Abdullah Al-Hussan (Chairman); Mohammed Sulaiman Al-Rumaih (CEO)
- Currency: SAR
- No. of listings: 233 (Feb 2024)
- Market cap: SAR 11 trillion (US$ 2.9 trillion) (Feb 2024)
- Volume: SAR 380.89 billion (US$ 102.84 billion) (1 July 2020)
- Indices: Tadawul All Share (TASI)
- Website: saudiexchange.sa

Saudi Exchange (Arabic: تداول السعودية) or Tadāwul (Arabic: تداول) is a stock exchange in Saudi Arabia. Tadāwul was formed in 2007 as a joint stock company and the sole entity authorized to act as a securities exchange in Saudi Arabia. However, trading began in 1954 through an informal financial market. In the 1970s, there were only 14 listed companies. The market acquired a more formal status as the Saudi Company for Share Registration in 1980. Tadāwul is regulated by the Capital Market Authority but has become partially self-regulating since 2018. It lists 239 publicly traded companies on the main market (as of 10 October 2024). It is among the world's largest stock exchanges, with a market capitalization exceeding US$3 trillion in July 2024.

As of 31 December 2020, its trading hours are 10:00 AM to 3:10 PM, Sunday to Thursday.

On 26 February 2017, the Saudi Parallel Market (Nomu) was launched as a parallel equity market with lighter listing requirements to provide companies an alternative platform for the public listing.

Tadāwul is completely owned by the Saudi Public Investment Fund.

== History ==
The Tadawul All-Share Index (TASI) reached its highest point at 20,634.86 on 25 February 2006.

Tadawul is an affiliate member of the International Organization of Securities Commissions (IOSCO), the World Federation of Exchanges (WFE), the Arab Federation of Exchanges (AFE), and is also a member of the United Nations' Sustainable Stock Exchanges (SSE) initiative. The share capital of Tadawul is SAR 1.2 Bn divided into 120 million shares of equal value of SAR 10.

=== 2006 stock market crash ===
Also known as the "Black February", the Saudi stock market collapsed in 2006, and the number of listed companies was 76, causing a loss of one trillion Saudi riyals, which led to the bankruptcy of many middle-income traders. Some of them sold their cars or invested their life savings on the market.

The second day of the crash on Sunday 26 February 2006 witnessed a wave of collective selling in the first minute of trading, which caused an increase in panic and contact with more than 60 companies with the lowest rate, and the closure of all market companies on a sharp decline, as the sale of 1.5 million shares was executed in the first minute of trading, especially after the Kingdom's Capital Market Authority (CMA) decided to reduce the volatility to 5% and implement it with the start of trading on Saturday, 25 February of the year 2006. The general index lost on the second day of the collapse nearly 980 points, equivalent to 4.75% of the total market, and the shares lost approximately 144.5 billion riyals out of its market value, the doors of hope for the return or stability of the market at reasonable levels of correction are closed.

National economic catastrophe that affected citizens, revealed the low level of economic management that did not succeed in reading the market crisis before it occurred, and was not given enough importance, then it was unable to manage and deal with it in an optimal manner, which helped in the occurrence of the major economic disaster in the country's history. Some attributed the cause of the collapse to many things, including stopping a number of speculators and the fear of others of similar sanctions, and to the decision to determine the percentage of fluctuation and the abolition of fractures, and prevent the return of speculators 'commissions, which seem weak compared to the main collapse of the price inflation that the regulatory authorities contributed to.

This necessitated King Abdullah's personal intervention to resolve the crisis, where he ordered the division of shares and the permitting of non-Saudi residents to invest directly in the stock market and not limiting it to investment funds and reducing the nominal value of the share, which were issued by decisions of the CMA and was applied.

=== 2019 Saudi Aramco trading ===
On 11 December 2019, Saudi Aramco's shares commenced trading on the Tadawul. The shares rose to 35.2 Saudi riyals, giving it a market capitalisation of about US$1.88 trillion, and surpassed the US$2 trillion mark on the second day of trading.

== Trading times ==
There are five trading days – Sunday, Monday, Tuesday, Wednesday and Thursday, with one trading session per trading day. No trading happens on official Saudi holidays, which are Saudi National Day, Eid al-Adha and Eid al-Fitr.

Times are UTC+3:

Market	Start time	End time
Trading in equities	10:00 AM	3:20 PM
Trading in ETFs	10:00 AM	3:20 PM
Trading in sukuk & bonds	10:00 AM	3:00 PM

== Annual returns ==
The following table shows the annual development of the Tadawul All-Share Index since 2001.

Year	Closing level	Change in index in points	Change in index in %
2001	2,430.11		
2002	2,518.08	87.97	3.62
2003	4,437.58	1,919.50	76.23
2004	8,206.23	3,768.65	84.93
2005	16,712.64	8,506.41	103.66
2006	7,933.29	−8,779.35	−52.53
2007	11,175.96	3,242.67	40.87
2008	4,802.99	−6,372.97	−57.02
2009	6,121.76	1,318.77	27.46
2010	6,620.75	498.99	8.15
2011	6,418.13	−202.62	−3.06
2012	6,801.22	383.09	5.97
2013	8,536.60	1,734.38	25.50
2014	8,333.30	−202.30	−2.37
2015	6,911.76	−1,421.54	−17.06
2016	7,210.43	298.67	4.32
2017	7,226.32	15.89	0.22
2018	7,826.73	600.41	8.31
2019	8,389.23	562.50	7.19
2020	8,689.53	300.30	3.58
2021	11,281.71	2,592.18	29.83
2022	10,478.46	−803.25	−7.12
2023	11,967.39	1488.93	14.21

== See also ==
- Economy of Saudi Arabia
- Electronic Securities Information System
- List of Asian stock exchanges
- List of companies of Saudi Arabia
- List of stock exchanges
