= Zamil Steel =

Saudi manufacturing company

Zamil Steel (Zamil Steel Holding Company Ltd.)
- Type: Holding
- Industry: Construction, Manufacturing
- Founded: 1977
- Headquarters: Dammam, Eastern Province, Saudi Arabia
- Key people: Nawaf M. Al Zamil; President
- Products: Pre-Engineered Buildings, Sandwich panel, MaxSEAM Panel, Insulated Panels, Structural, Pressure Vessel, Transmission Tower, Lattice Steel Tower, Galvanization
- Number of employees: 3,500
- Website: www.zamilsteel.com

Zamil Steel (Zamil Steel Holding Company) is a manufacturing and fabrication group that provides products, engineering systems and services for the construction industry. The company's headquarters is in Saudi Arabia. The company expanded its operations with the establishment of new factories in Egypt, India, United Arab Emirates and Vietnam.

== History ==
Founded in 1930 by Abdullah Al Hamad Al Zamil, presently known as Zamil Group Holding, established a joint venture with Soule Steel of USA, begins production and becomes the first company to manufacture PEB (Pre-engineered building) in Saudi Arabia.

Zamil Steel Holding is owned by Zamil Industrial Investment Co. (Zamil Industrial), a Saudi Joint Stock company formed in 1998, and is listed in Tadawul (Saudi Stock Exchange).

== Achievements and awards ==
- 2012 – Environmental Performance Certificate.
- 2003 – Golden Dragon Prize

== See also ==
- Nomenclature of PEB (Pre-engineered building).
- List of companies of Saudi Arabia
- Metal Building Manufacturers Association
