= Abdulaziz bin Abdullah Al Zamil =

Saudi Arabian businessman

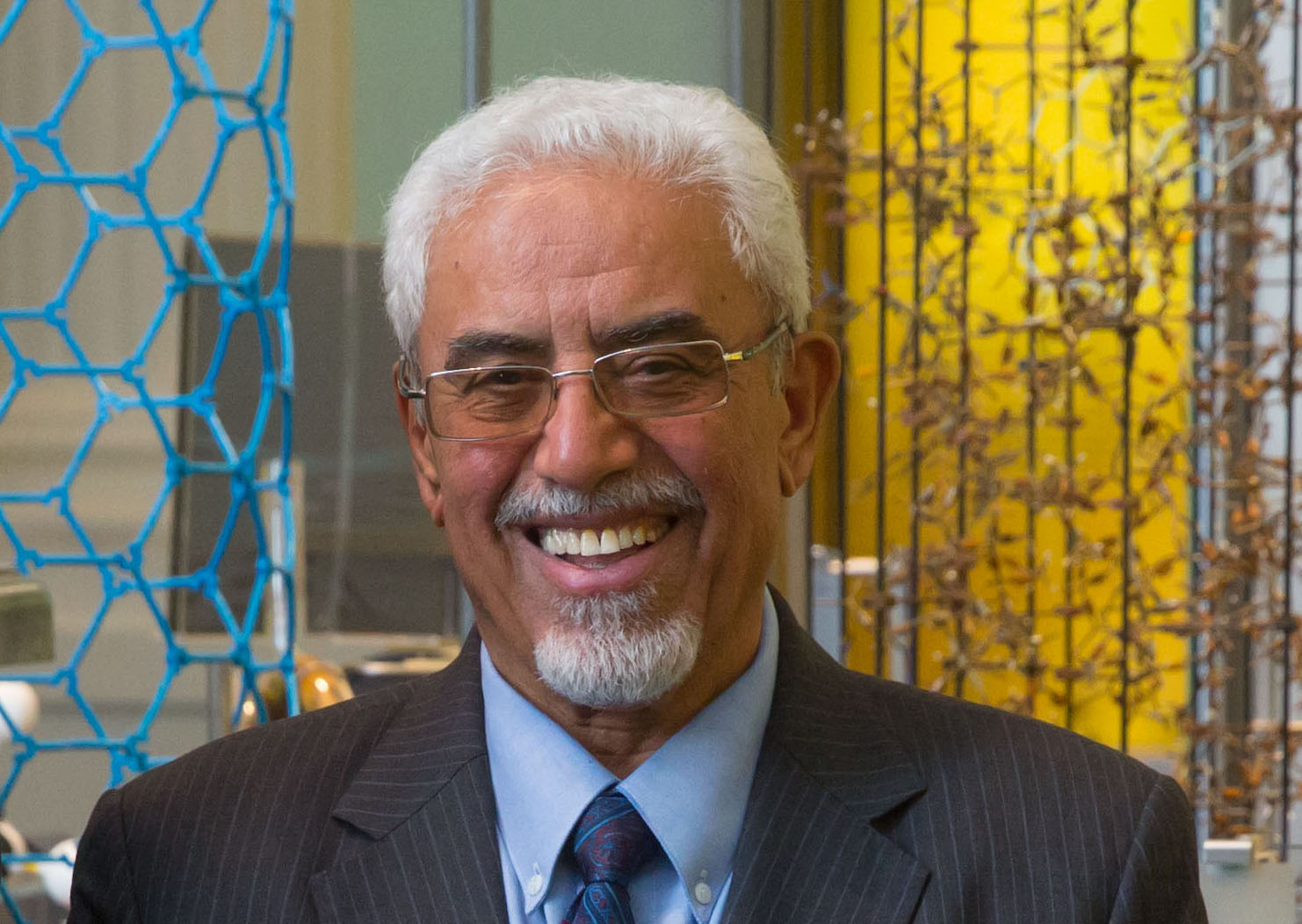
- Al Zamil in 2018
- Born: 1942; Bahrain
- Died: October 6, 2019 (aged 76–77)
- Education: University of Southern California
- Organization(s): Zamil Group Holding Company, Saudi Basic Industries Corporation, Saudi International Petrochemical Company
- Parent: Abdullah Al-Hamad Al Zamil
- Relatives: Abdulrahman Abdullah Al Zamil (brother)
- Awards: King Abdul Aziz Medal, 1984; Richard J. Bolte Sr. Award for supporting industries, 2015

Abdulaziz bin Abdullah Al Zamil (1942 – October 6, 2019) was an industrial engineer, whose work in industry and government was important to the industrial development of Saudi Arabia. As the original chief executive of Saudi Basic Industries Corporation (SABIC), as Minister of Industry and Electricity, and through his family's Zamil Group Holding Company, he was instrumental in creating a nationally based, profitable, high-tech industrial enterprise in Saudi Arabia. Al Zamil encouraged careful expansion with strong partners on a basis of sound technology in a wide variety of areas. Zamil Group, which now employs more than 12,000 people in 60 countries, is involved in diverse sectors including general construction, paints, plastics, petrochemicals, shipbuilding, and port management. He was awarded the King Abdul Aziz Medal, 1984 and the Richard J. Bolte Sr. Award for supporting industries in 2015.

== Early life and education ==
Abdul Aziz Bin Abdullah Al Zamil was born in 1942 in Bahrain. He was the fourth of twelve sons of Abdullah Al-Hamad Al Zamil, originally from Onaiza, Central Arabia. Abdullah Al-Hamad Al Zamil established a food and textile trading entity in Bahrain in the 1930s, later expanding into real estate investment. Upon his death in 1961, the family chose to continue operation of his business as a group, under the leadership of the eldest son, Mohammed.

Abdul Aziz Al Zamil attended primary school in Bahrain, where he also began his secondary school education. However, he completed his final year of high school in 1959 in Kuwait, together with his brother Abdulrahman Abdullah Al Zamil. After briefly studying business at Cairo University in Egypt, Al-Zamil decided to pursue studies in Great Britain. He attended a technical college in Salisbury and then enrolled in Concord College, where he studied math, biology, zoology, physics, and chemistry, and where he also strengthened his English language skills. In 1963 he received a scholarship from the government of Saudi Arabia to study at the University of Southern California (USC) in the United States. Because of the strong English language skills he had developed in Great Britain, he was able to complete his bachelor's and master's degrees within five years, receiving his bachelor's in industrial engineering in 1967, and his master's in 1968 from the University of Southern California.

== Career ==
Returning to Saudi Arabia in 1968, Abdul Aziz Bin Abdullah Al Zamil worked for some years at the Saudi Consulting House, a joint venture of the Ministry of Trade and Industry of the Saudi government and the United Nations Industrial Development Organization. Under a United Nations fellowship, he traveled internationally to study industrial development in countries such as India, the Netherlands, Ireland and the United Kingdom. Upon his return he was promoted to Deputy Director General.

In 1975 he was asked by Ghazi Abdul Rahman Al Gosaibi, then Minister of Industry and Electricity, to take charge of an effort to form a state-owned joint-stock company that would serve as a catalyst for the industrialization of Saudi Arabia. That company, Saudi Basic Industries Corporation (SABIC), was formally established by royal decree in 1976. Together with a group of young university-trained Saudis whom he recruited, Al-Zamil reviewed a large number of joint-venture proposals and identified those that were most promising. He then helped negotiated a series of joint-venture agreements with leading foreign chemical companies. Central to each of these agreements were provisions for the training of Saudi SABIC employees by the joint-venture partner. By this means there was an enormous transfer of business, technical, and marketing know-how to Saudi Arabia. He served as Vice Chairman and Chief Executive of SABIC from 1976 to 1983. In 1983 he was appointed Minister of Industry and Electricity for the Kingdom of Saudi Arabia and became Chairman of SABIC. He remained in these positions until 1995. During his tenure SABIC's first generation and second generation of manufacturing operations came on line and then expanded, producing such products as polyethylene, propylene, ethylene glycol, ethylene dichloride, methyl tertiary butyl ether, vinyl chloride monomer, polyvinyl chloride, polyester, ammonia, and urea. At the same time, Al-Zamil also encouraged the development of Saudi Arabia's private industrial sector and worked to expand and improve access to electricity throughout Saudi Arabia. During this time he traveled extensively, supporting the training and recruiting of young Saudis in technical and professional fields, as well as promoting economic and industrial development. In 1984, he received the King Abdul Aziz Medal from King Fahd.

"In my opinion, building people was as important as building factories... As a result, training became the core of the Saudi development programme, which has seen the kingdom enter into sophisticated industrial sectors through joint venture initiatives."

— Abdul Aziz Bin Abdullah Al Zamil, "Knight of Industrial Development HE Eng Abdul Aziz Bin Abdullah Al Zamil". Arabian Knight. 14 (4). 2012.

Retiring from his government position in August 1995, Al Zamil jointed the family business, Zamil Group Holding Company, and supported its expansion into the newly accessible area of petrochemicals. He established the Saudi International Petrochemical Company (Sipchem) with his brother Abdulrahman, and became Chairman. In 2004, the Zamil Group helped to establish Sahara Petrochemicals Company. Again, Al Zamil became Chairman. He served as Director; Chairman of the board; and President, Chief Operating Officer and Director of the Zamil Group Holding Company.

Eng. Abdulaziz Bin Abdullah Al Zamil was also the chairman of the board of directors of the Alinma Bank, as well as other institutions. He was awarded the Richard J. Bolte Sr. Award for supporting industries for 2015 by the Chemical Heritage Foundation (today Science History Institute).
