= Peter Young =

Peter or Pete Young may refer to:

== Sports ==
- Peter Dalton Young (1927–2002), English rugby union player
- Peter Young (cricketer, born 1961), Australian cricketer
- Pete Young (born 1968), American baseball player
- Peter Young (rugby league) (fl. 1970s), Australian rugby league player
- Peter Young (skier) (fl. 1984–1994), British paralympic skier
- Peter Young (cricketer, born 1986), English cricketer

== Others ==
- Peter Young (tutor) (1544–1628), Scottish diplomat, tutor to James VI of Scotland
- Peter Young (British Army officer) (1912–1976), British general
- Peter Young (historian) (1915–1988), British World War II soldier
- Peter Young (priest) (1916–1987), British Anglican clergyman, Archdeacon of Cornwall
- Peter Young (artist) (born 1940), American artist
- Peter Young (judge) (born 1940), Australian judge
- Peter C. Young (born 1940), British-born ichthyologist and parasitologist
- Peter J. Young (1954–1981), British cosmologist
- Peter Young (set decorator) (died 2025), British Academy Award-winning set director
- Peter Young (banker) (fl. 1980s–present), American banker
- Peter Young (activist) (fl. 1990s–present), American animal rights activist
- Peter J. Young (1954–1981), British astrophysicist
- Peter Young (sportscaster) Canadian sports announcer known for his decades of work in Winnipeg MB.

== Other uses ==
- Peter Young Stakes, Australian horse race

== See also ==
- Peter the Younger (1547–1568), Prince of Wallachia
