= Sipchem =

Saudi joint stock company

Saudi International Petrochemical Company (Sipchem) الشركة السعودية العالمية للبتروكيماويات
- Company type: Joint-stock company
- ISIN: SA000A0KFKK0
- Founded: 1999; 27 years ago
- Headquarters: Khobar, Saudi Arabia
- Key people: Abdul Aziz Al Zamil (Chairman); Abdullah Al Saadoon (CEO)
- Revenue: 1,694,849,000 Saudi riyal (2019)
- Total assets: 23,991,272,000 Saudi riyal (2019)
- Website: http://www.sipchem.com

Saudi International Petrochemical Company (Sipchem) is a Saudi joint stock company owned jointly by private sector investors of Saudi Arabia and GCC countries. It is also known as Sahara International Petrochemical Company. The company is the subsidiary of Zamil Group Holding. It was incorporated on 22 December 1999 with a paid-in capital of SR 500 million. The share capital was initially increased in 2003 by issuing 3 million shares, thereby raising the capital to SR 650 million. Subsequently, in April 2005 the share capital was further raised for the second time by SR 850 million, resulting in a total share capital of SR 1,500 billion.

Sipchem has chosen Jubail Industrial City to build its industrial complex for producing various chemicals because this city is considered one of the leading industrial areas in the world, having all necessary infrastructure for such large projects. The availability of raw materials in the Eastern province, the presence of Saudi Aramco that supplies required feedstocks at very competitive prices and in large quantities, the ease of export from the city via KFIP and its relative proximity to South Eastern Asian countries to which most petrochemicals are exported, are other reasons for this choice.

== History ==
In 2013 SIPCHEM and a member of the South Korean Hanwha Group formed Wahaj as a joint venture. The shares are split in a 3:1 ratio.

== See also ==
- List of companies of Saudi Arabia
