= Moore Equipment Company =

Shipyard in Stockton, California, United States

Coordinates: 37.9550582°N 121.29923°W

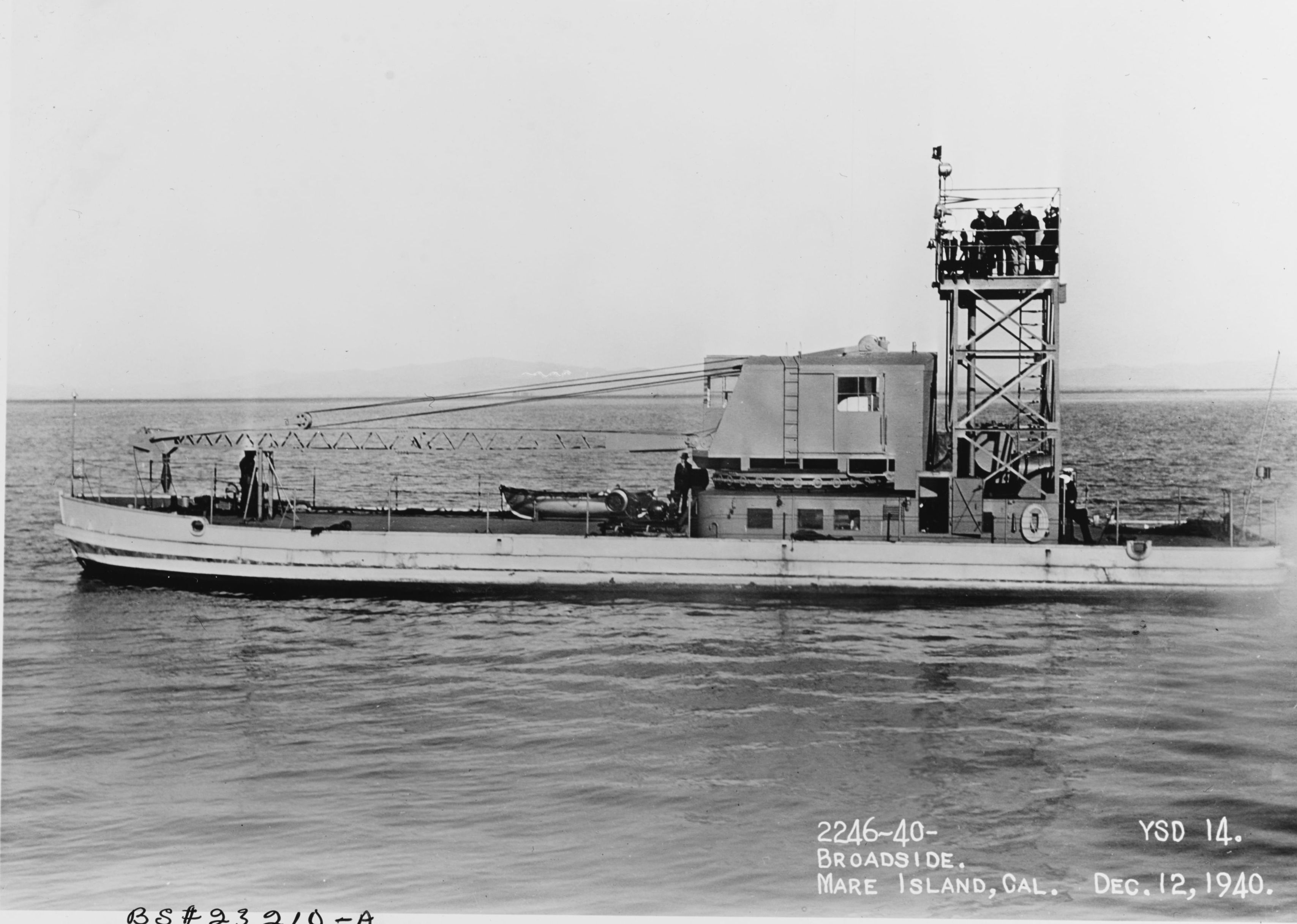
Seaplane Wrecking Derrick YSD-14

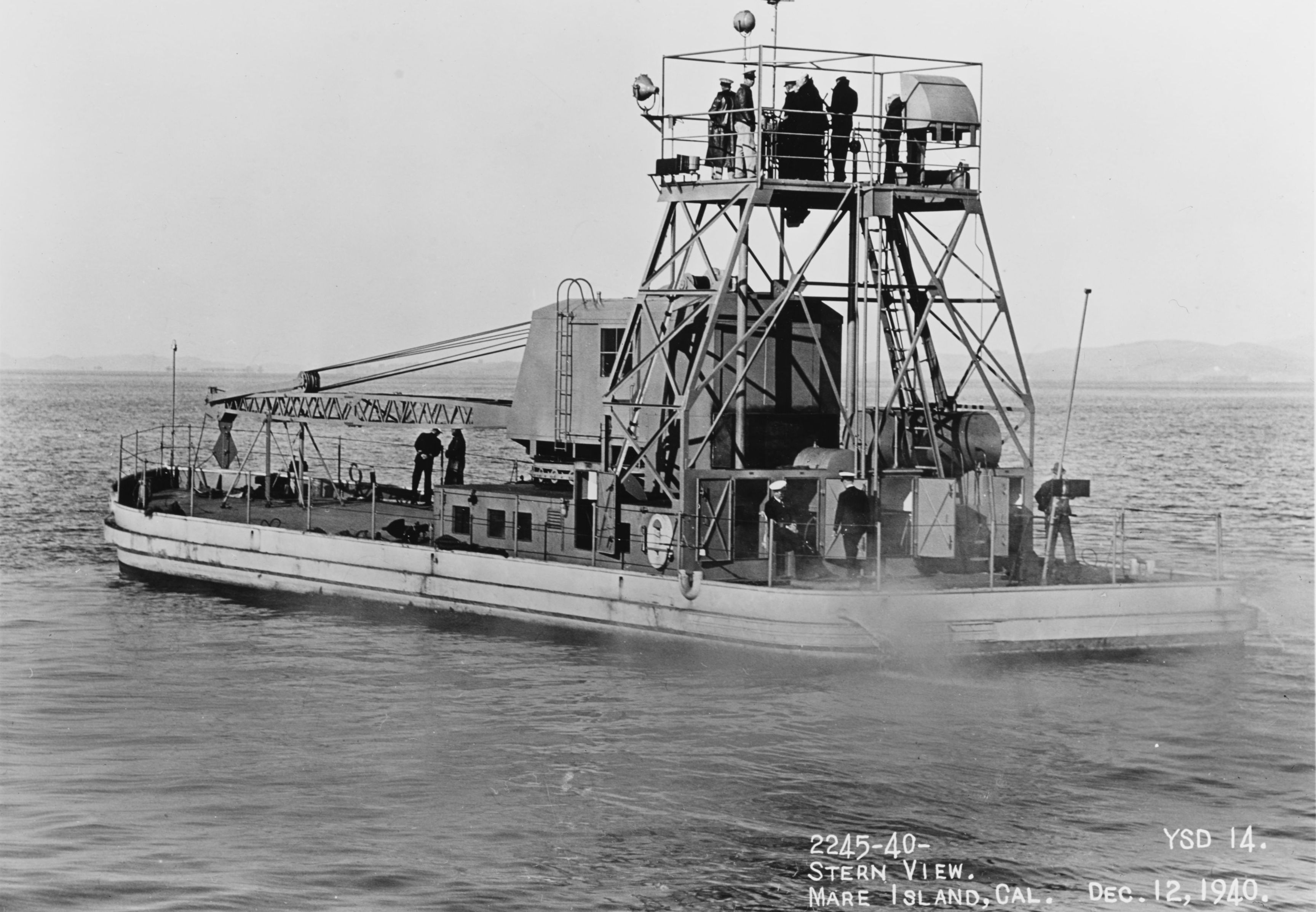
Seaplane Wrecking Derrick YSD-14

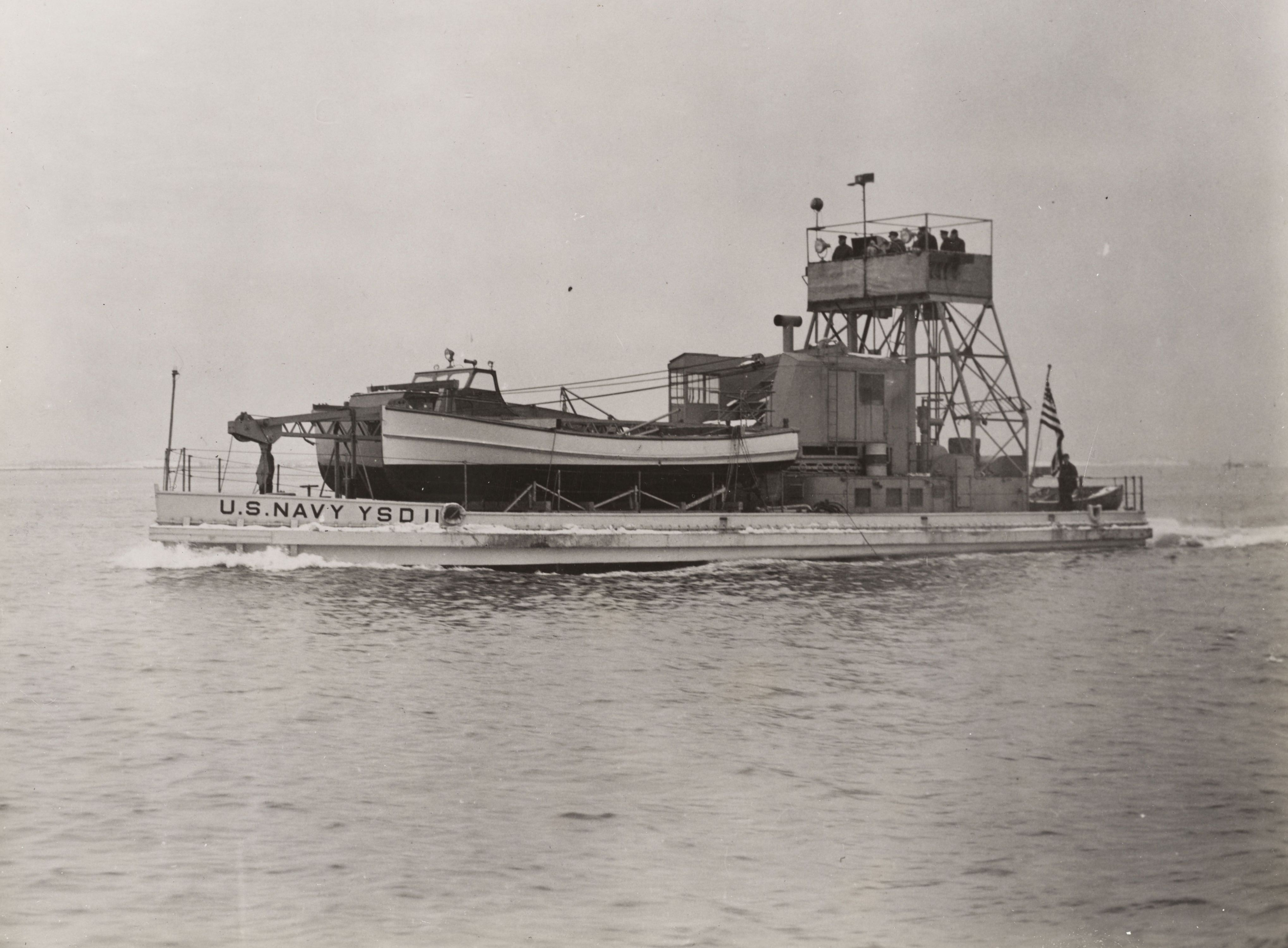
Seaplane Wrecking Derrick YSD-11, in 1940

Moore Equipment Company was founded in 1929 by Stanley S. Moore and his father in Stockton, California. Moore Equipment Company a repair and manufacture company of farm machines, road machines and tools. To support the World War 2 demand for ships Moore Equipment Company built a shipyard and switched over to military construction and built: US Navy YSD-11 Class Seaplane Wrecking Derricks, landing craft and barges. Moore Equipment Company also did work for the US Army repairing and rebuilding jeeps by way of the Ford Motor in Richmond. The shipyard also did Navy ship repair. Moore Equipment Company's main work before the war was on tractors, cranes, trucks, bulldozers, power winches, road scrapers and tools. The Moore Equipment Company office was at 1250 South Wilson Way, Stockton, now the Fairgrounds Industrial Park. Equipment Company sold the factory on February 15, 1944, to International Harvester Company. The shipyard closed after the war.

== Moore Equipment Company ==
Moore Equipment Company in Stockton, California built YSD-11 Class Seaplane Wrecking Derrick:

Name	Built	Notes
YSD 35	1943	Worked 17th Naval District, accidentally lost, 16 May 1946
YSD 36	1943	Lost on 9 August 1946 off Okinawa
YSD 37	1943	Lost off Eniwetok 10 December 1946
YSD 42	1943	lost off Guam May 1976
YSD 43	1943	Lost Lost off Eniwetok October 1946
YSD 44	1943	
YSD 45	1943	
YSD 46	1943	To National Defense Reserve Fleet (NDRF) in 1974
YSD 47	1943	
YSD 48	1943	Typhoon Louise at Okinawa, 9 October 1945, Lost
YSD 49	1943	
YSD 50	1943	

== Landing craft ==
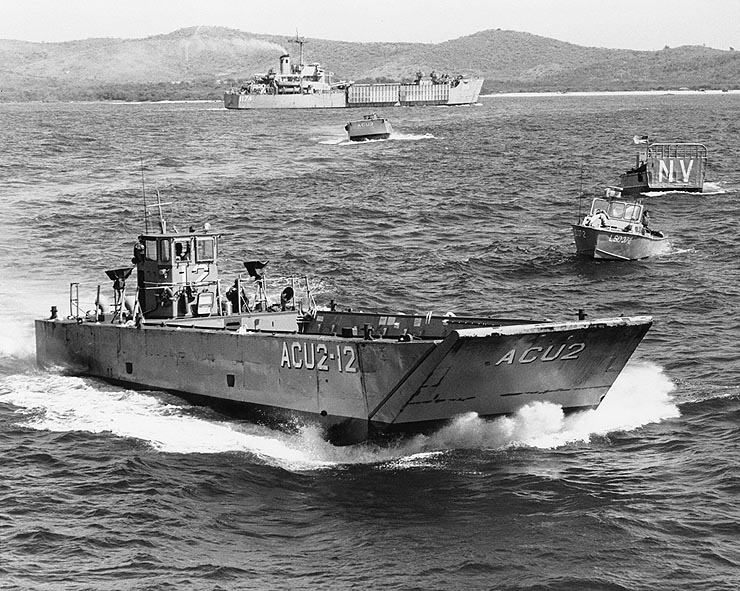
LCM Landing Craft Mechanized

Moore Equipment Company built Landing Craft Mechanized (LCM) Mark 6. Landing Craft Mechanized Mark 6 had:

- Power plant:
  - 2 Detroit 6-71 diesel engines; 348 hp (260 kW) sustained; twin shaft; or
  - 2 Detroit 8V-71 diesel engines; 460 hp (340 kW) sustained; twin shaft
- Length: 56.2 feet (17.1 m)
- Beam: 14 feet (4.3 m)
- Displacement: 64 tons (65 metric tons) full load
- Speed: 9 knots (10 mph; 17 km/h)
- Range: 130 miles (210 km) at 9 knots (17 km/h)
- Military lift: 34 tons (34.6 metric tons) or 80 troops
- Crew: 5

== Barges ==
Built in 1945 four YC barges:

- YC-1089, barge a Type B ship, delivered 11 September 1945, remove from Navy 13 March 2001. Displacement 120 t.(lite) 590 t.(full); Length 110 feet; Beam 35 feet and Draft 8 feet.
- YC-1090
- YC-1091
- YC-1092

== See also ==
- California during World War II
- Maritime history of California
- Wooden boats of World War 2
