= Richard J. Bolte Sr. Award =

- Awarded for: A leader who contributes to the growth and development of the chemical and molecular sciences community.
- Date: 2006
- Presented by: Science History Institute

The Richard J. Bolte Sr. Award recognizes "outstanding contributions by a leader who provides products or services vital to the continuing growth and development of the chemical and molecular sciences community". The medal is presented annually under the sponsorship of the Science History Institute (formerly the Chemical Heritage Foundation) at its annual Heritage Day. The inaugural award was presented to Richard J. Bolte, Sr., founder and chairman of BDP International, in 2006, as the Award for Supporting Industries. It was renamed the Richard J. Bolte Sr. Award for Supporting Industries in 2007.

== Recipients ==
The award is given yearly and was first presented in 2006.

- Steven Holland, 2020
- Frederick Frank, 2019
- W. Graham Richards, 2018
- Peter Young, 2017
- Roy T. Eddleman, 2016
- Abdul Aziz Bin Abdullah Al Zamil, 2015
- Atsushi Horiba, 2014
- Alan Walton, 2013
- G. Steven Burrill, 2012
- Lawrence B. Evans, 2011
- C. Berdon Lawrence, 2010
- David and Alice Schwartz, 2009
- Jerry M. Sudarsky, 2008
- Eugene Garfield, 2007
- Richard J. Bolte, Sr., 2006

=== Photo Gallery ===
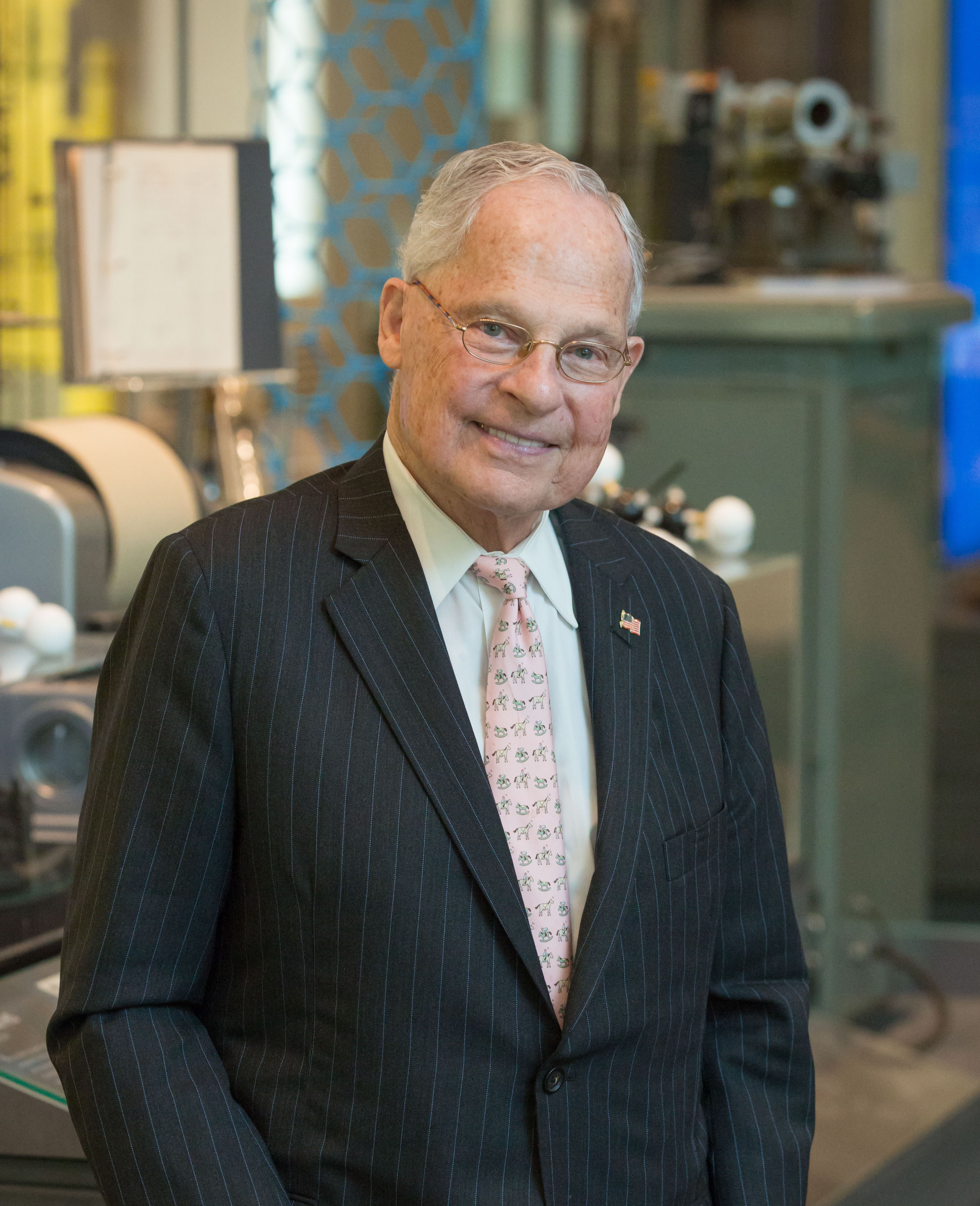
Frederick Frank, 2019

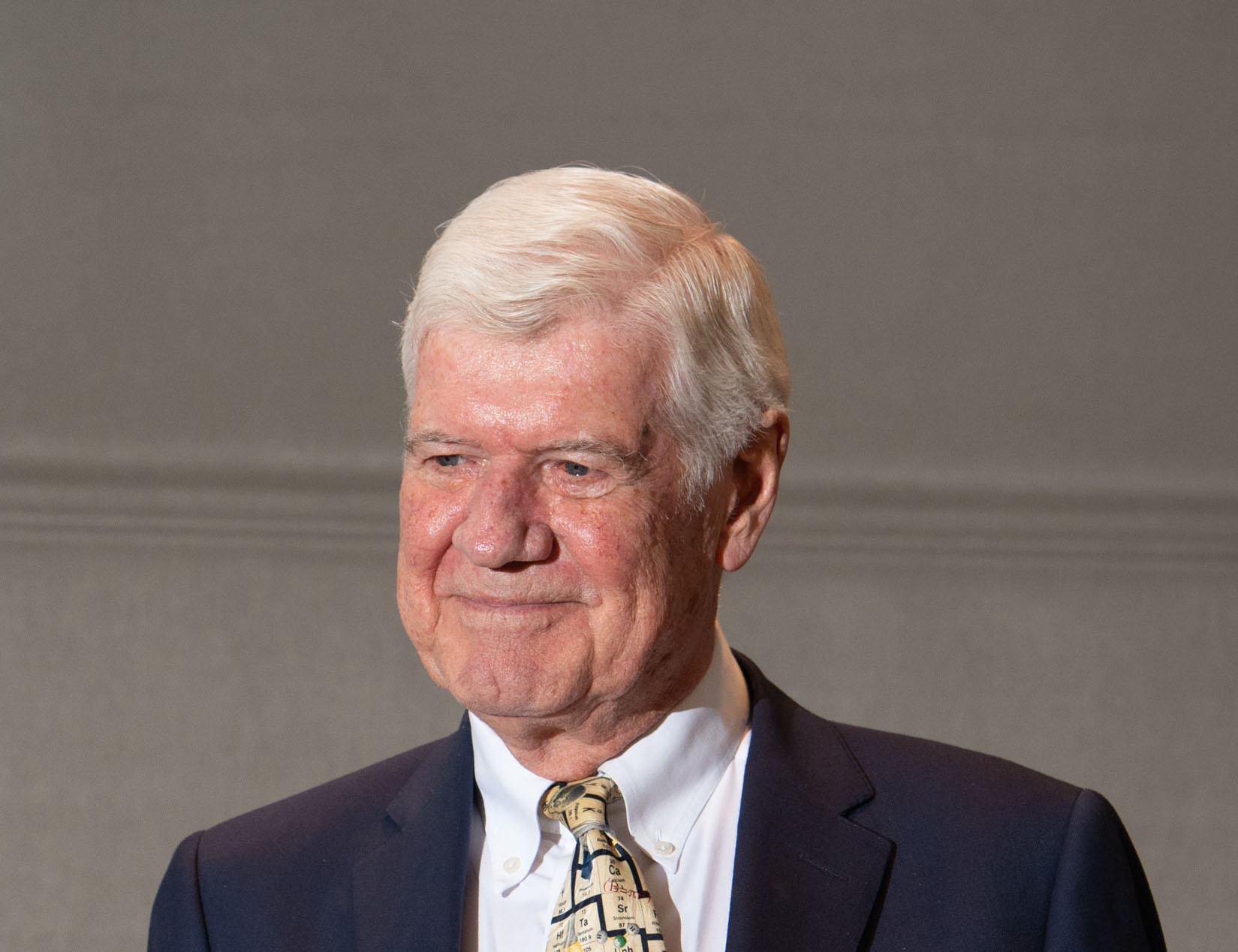
W. Graham Richards, 2018

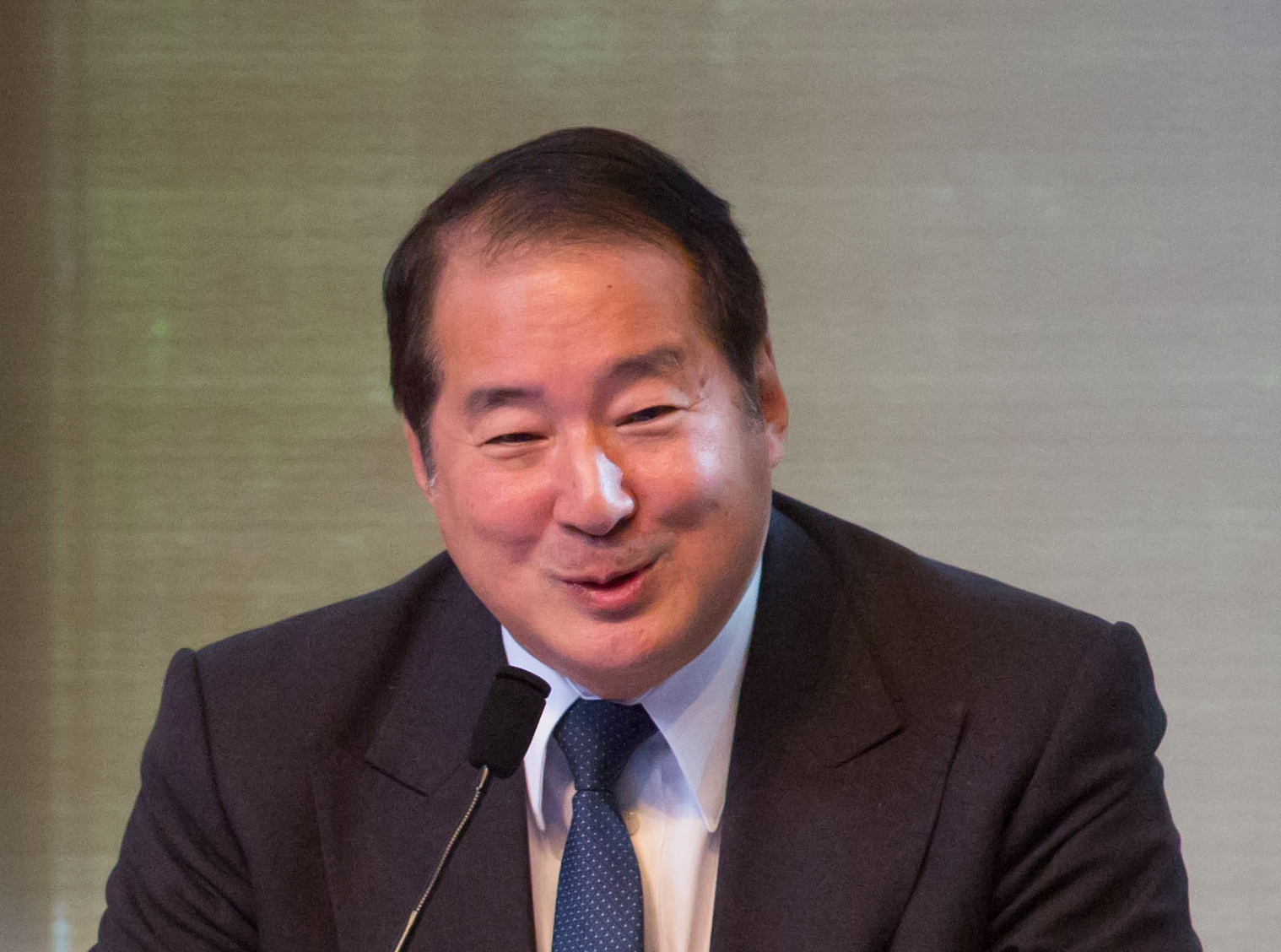
Peter Young, 2017

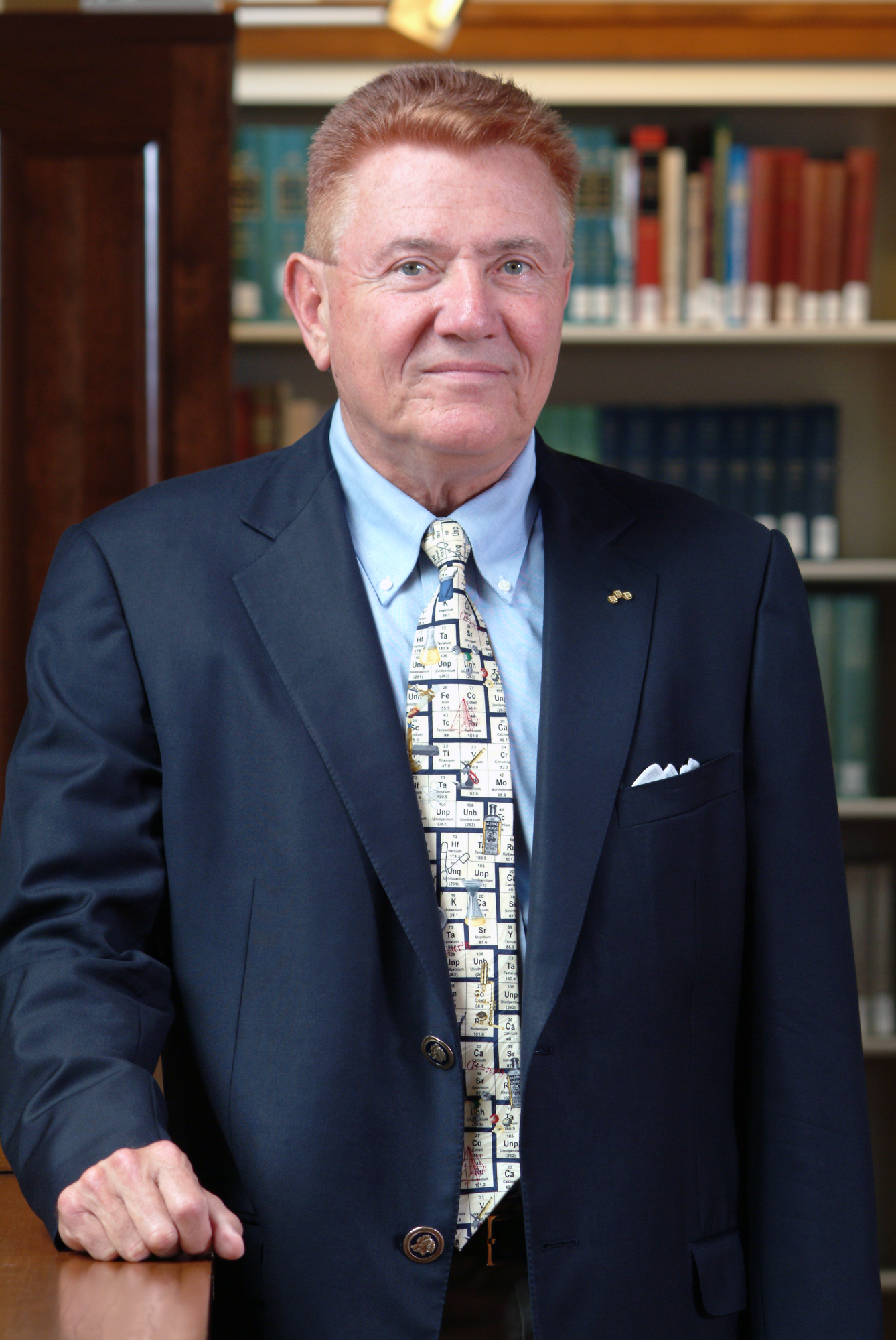
Roy T. Eddleman, 2016 (photo, 2005)

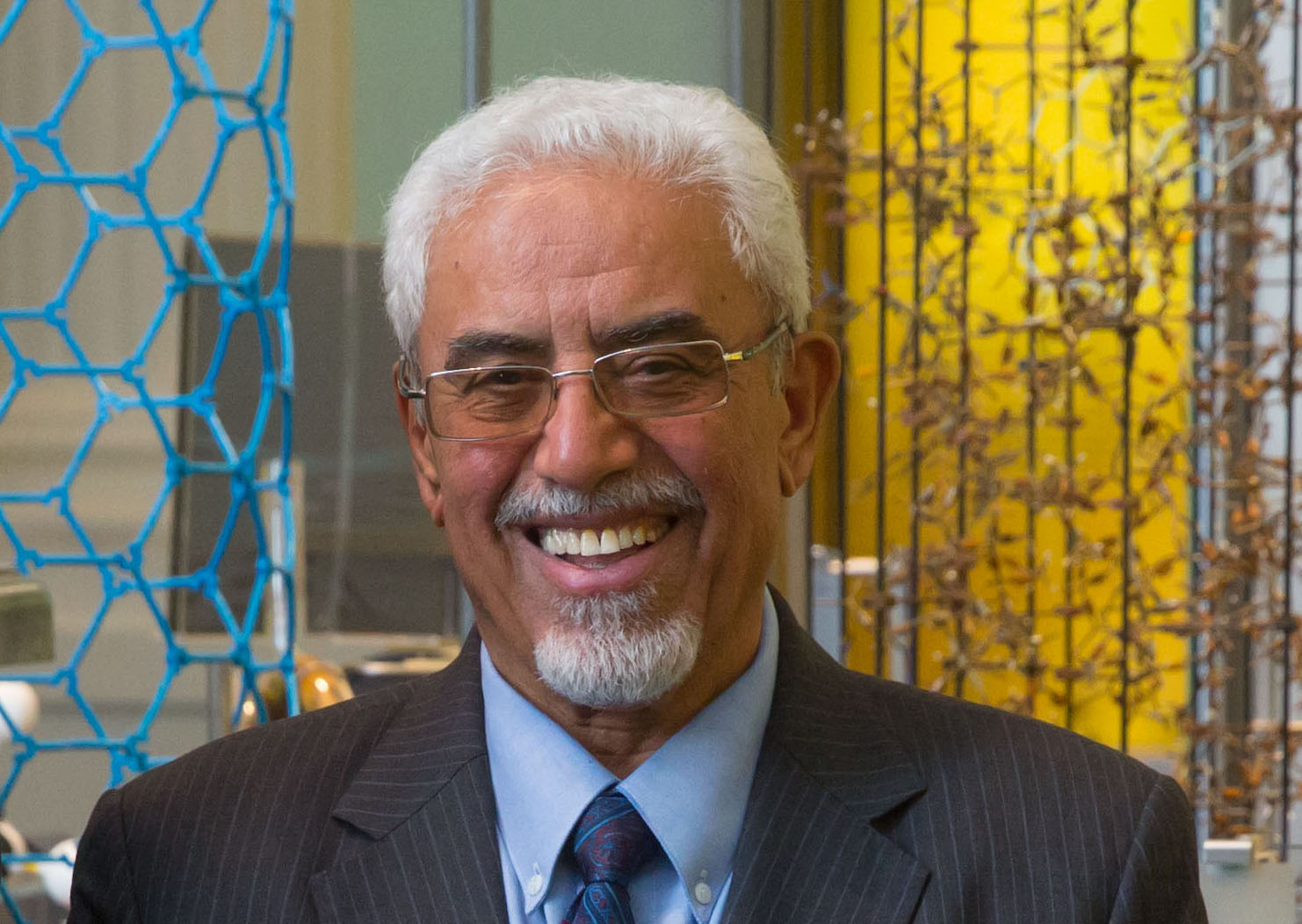
His Excellency Abdulaziz Al-Zamil, 2015

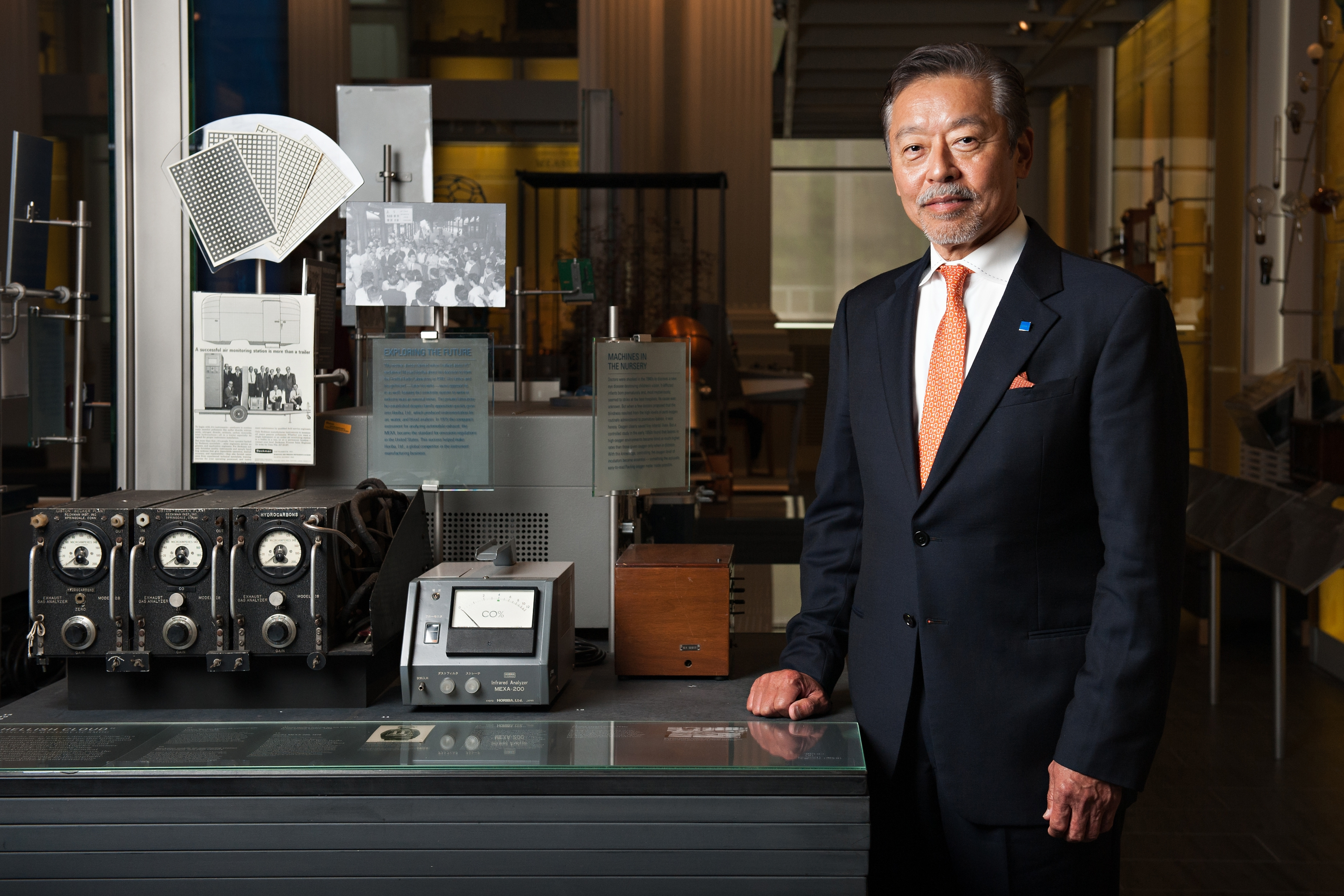
Atsushi Horiba, 2014

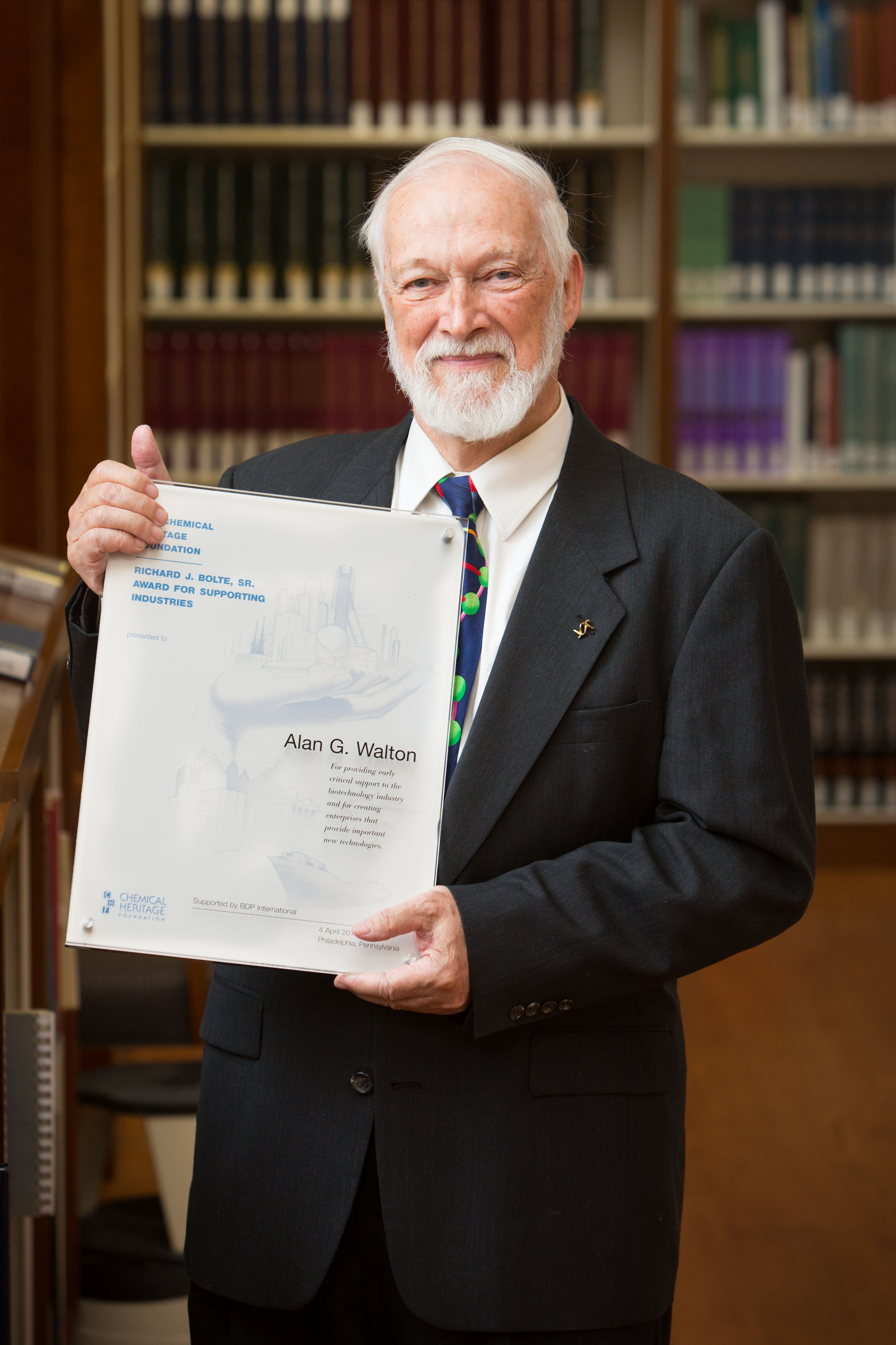
Alan Walton, 2013

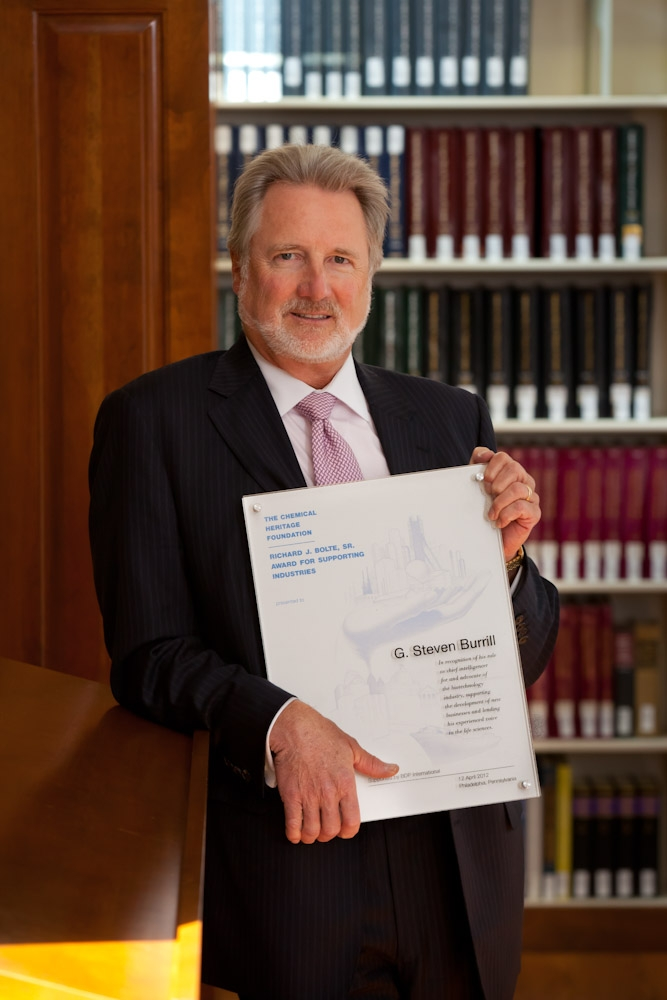
G. Steven Burrill, 2012

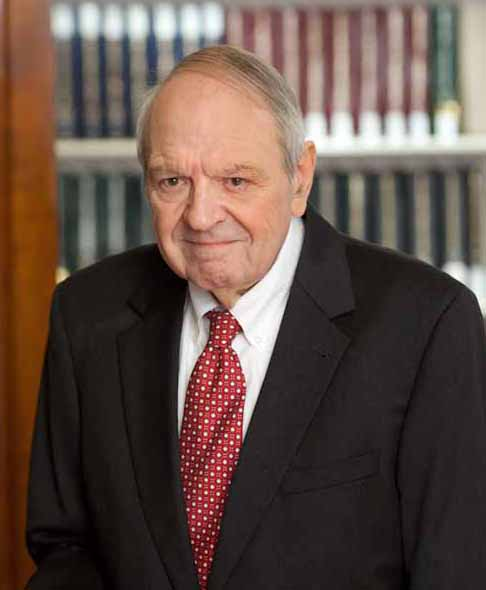
Lawrence B. Evans, 2011

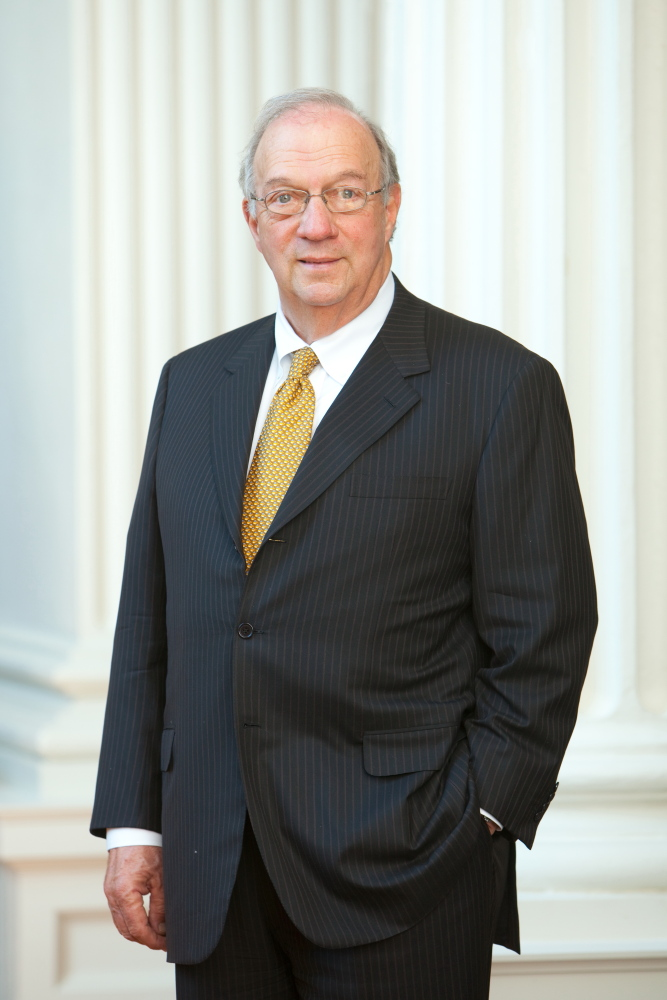
C. Berdon Lawrence, 2010

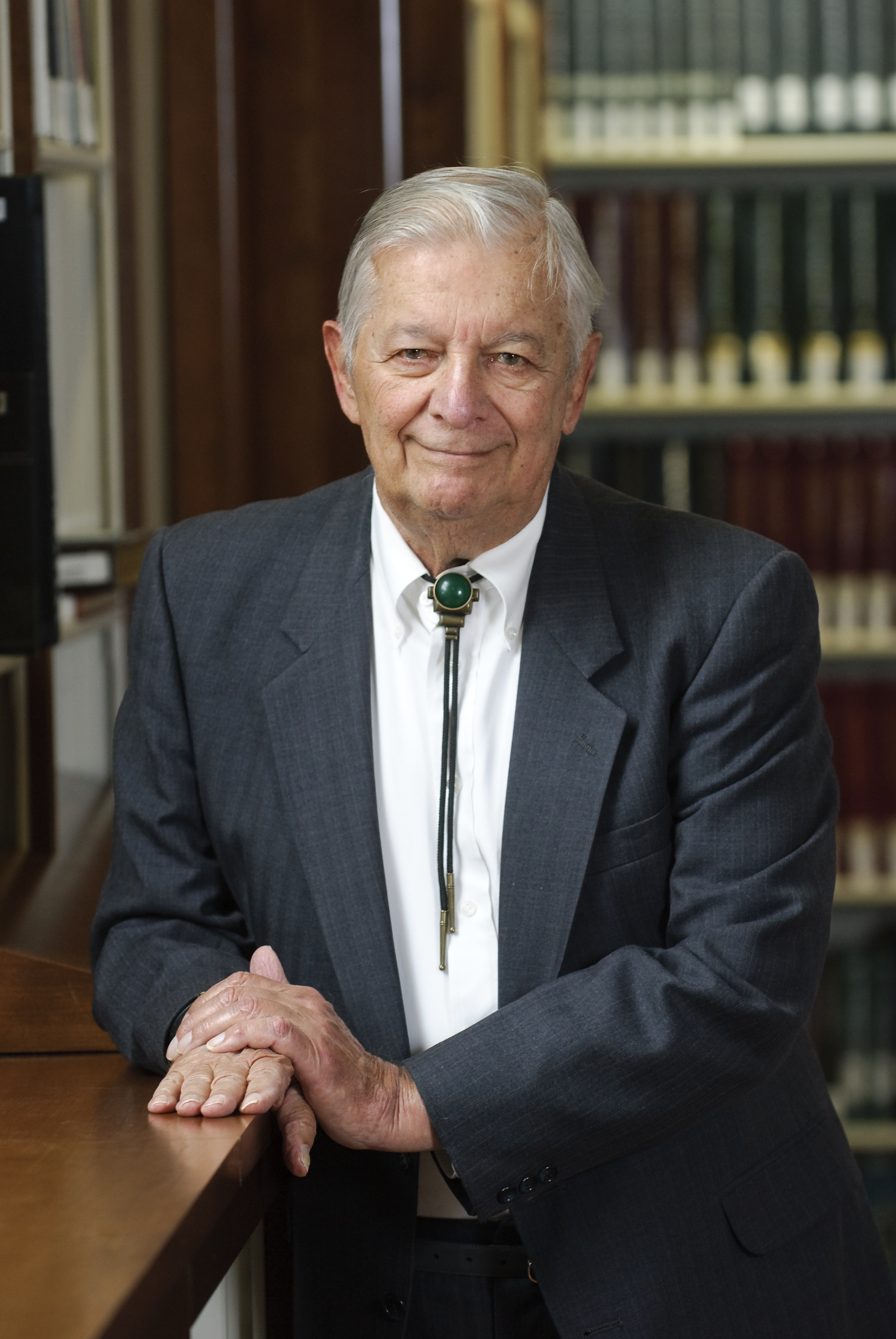
David Schwartz, 2009

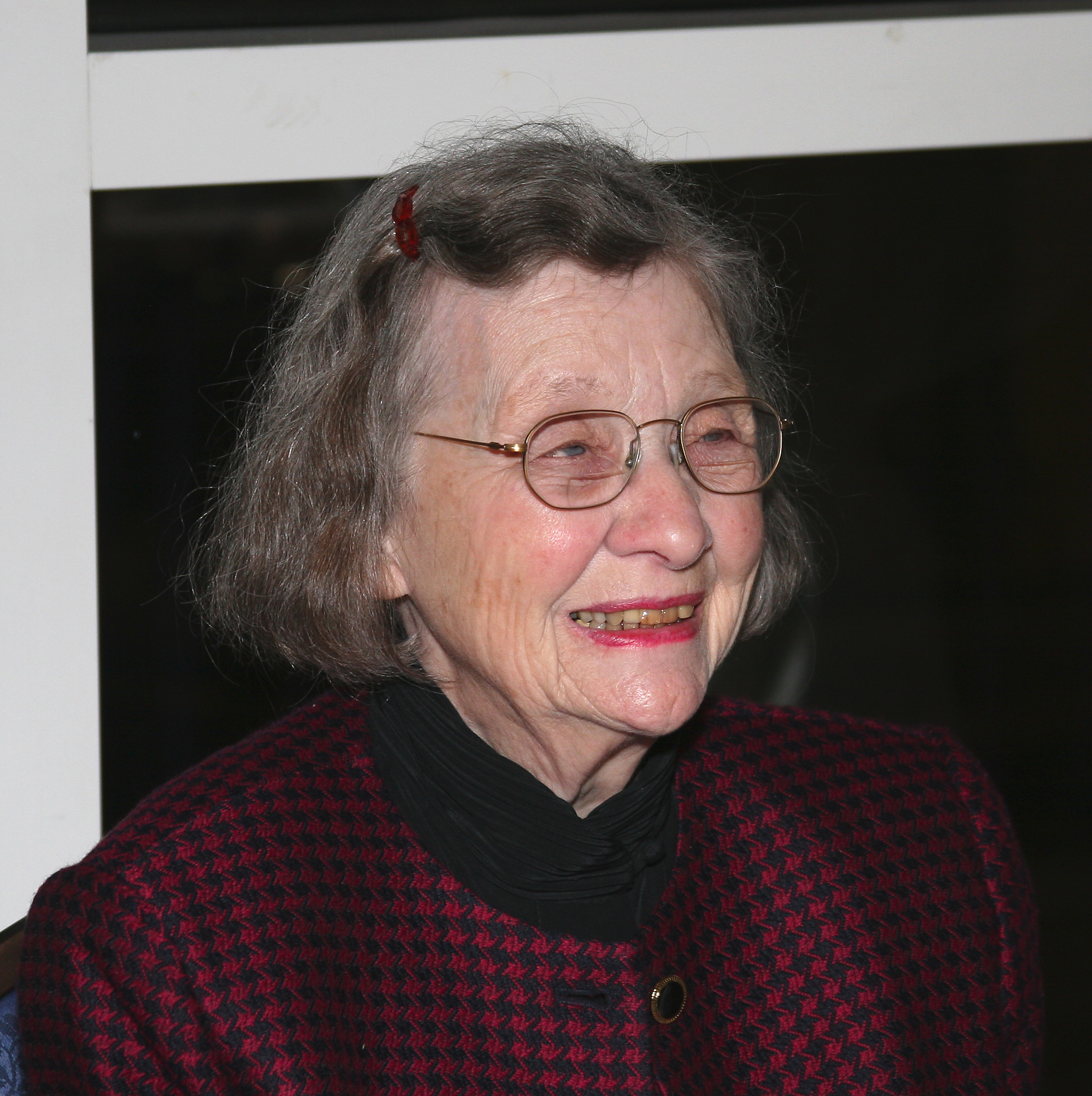
Alice Schwartz, 2009 (photo, 2007)

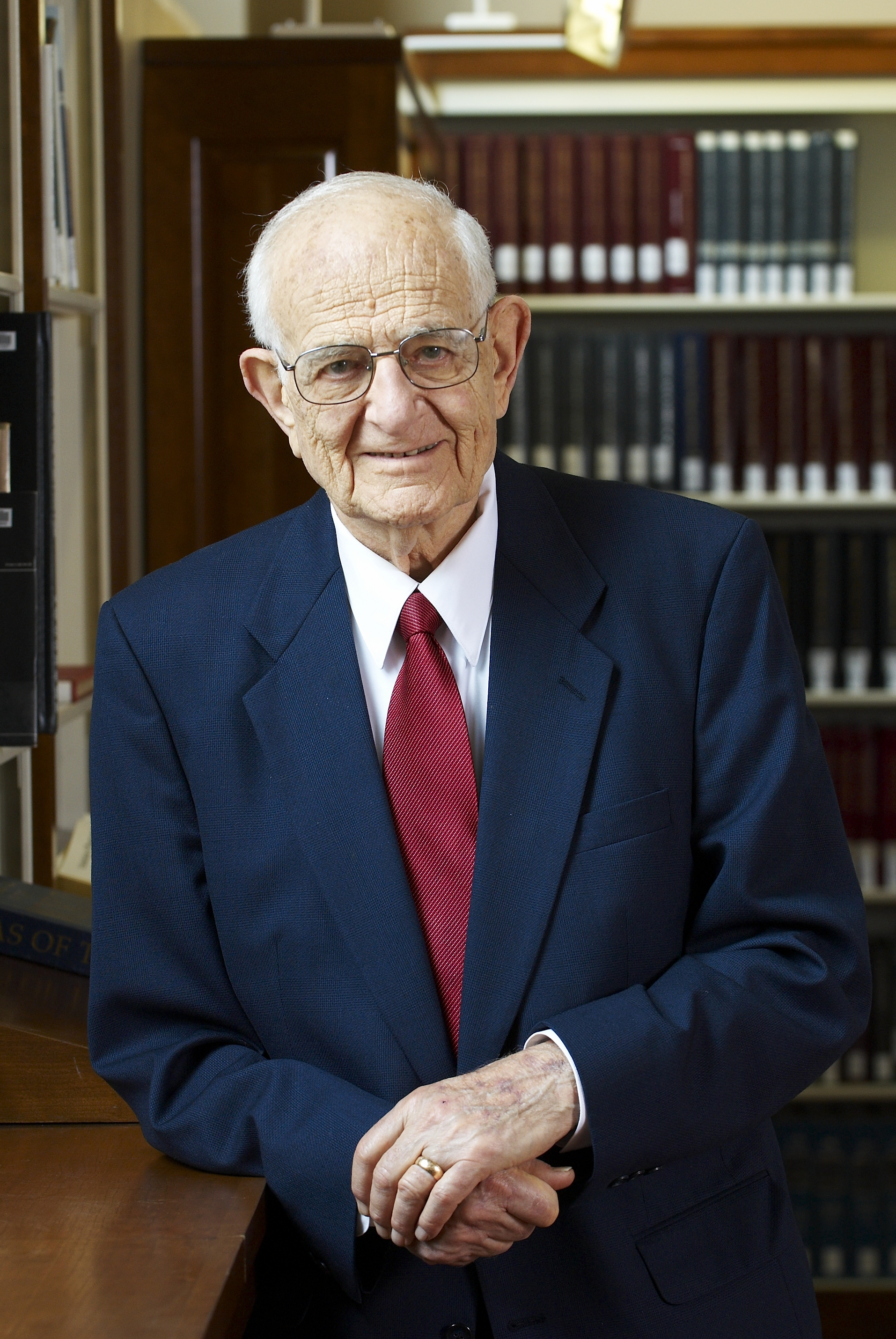
Jerry M. Sudarsky, 2008

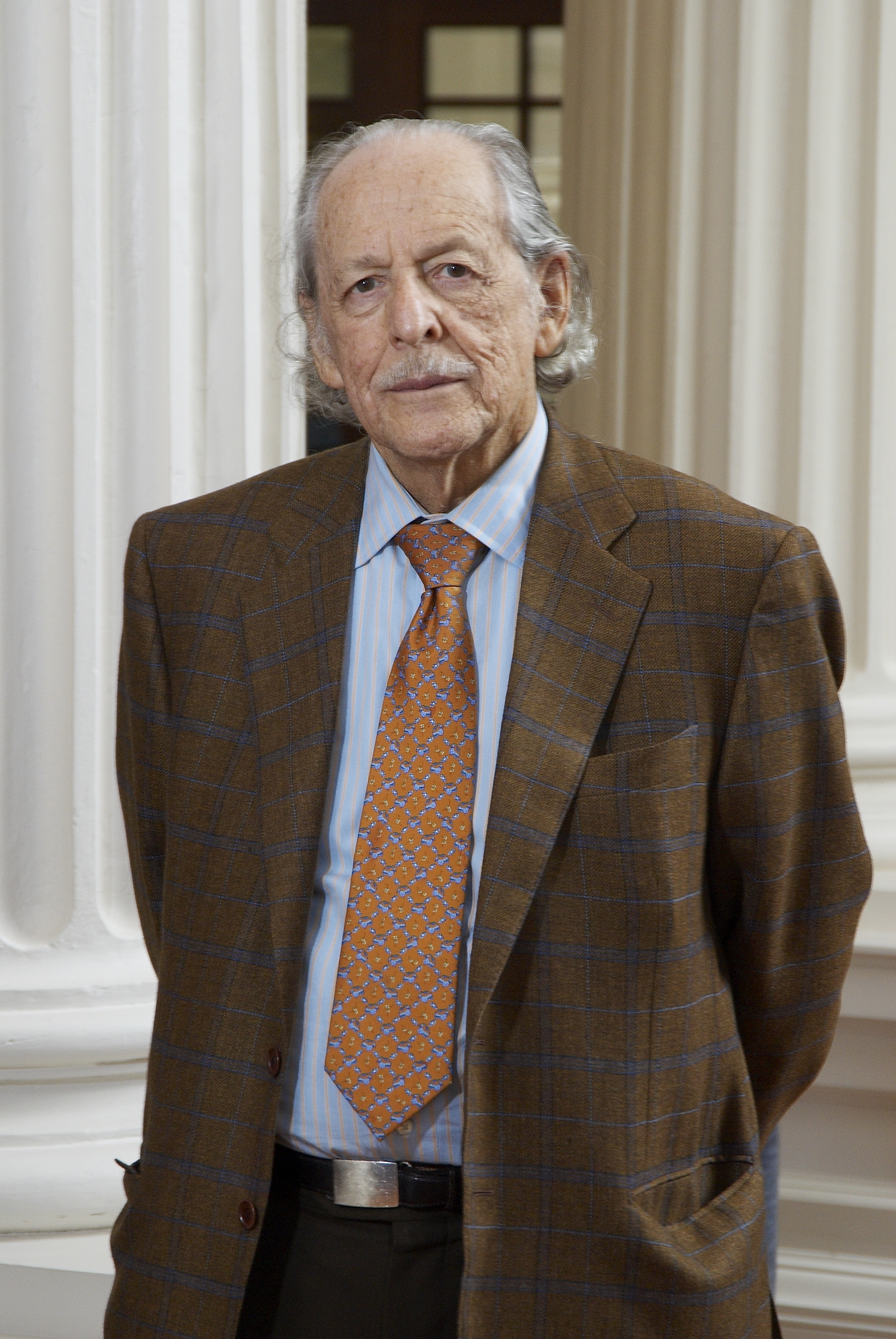
Eugene Garfield, 2007

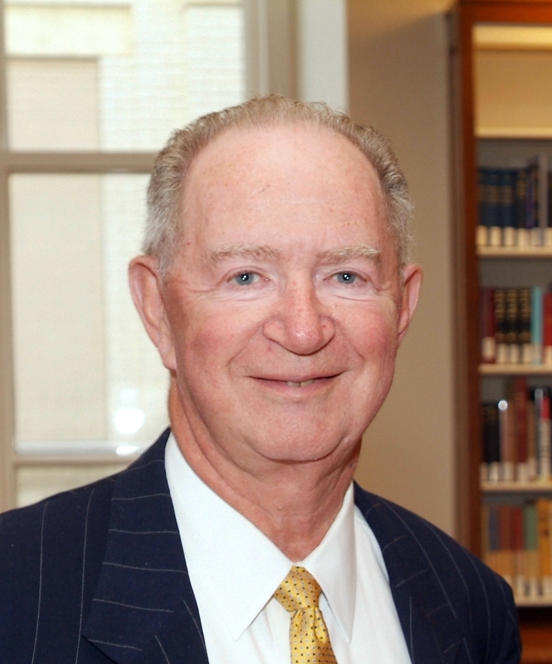
Richard J. Bolte, Sr., 2006 (photo, 2005)

== See also ==
- List of chemistry awards
