= Graham Richards =

English theoretical chemist (1939–2025)

Graham Richards CBE FRS FLSW CChem HonFRSC
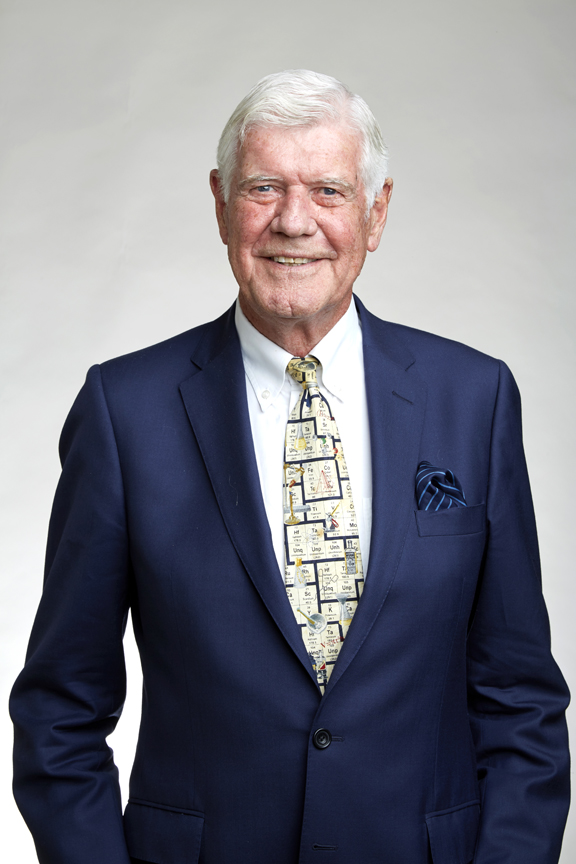
- Richards in 2018
- Born: William Graham Richards; 1 October 1939; Hoylake, Cheshire, England
- Died: 11 February 2025 (aged 85)
- Education: Birkenhead School; University of Oxford (BA, MA, DPhil)
- Awards: Richard J. Bolte Sr. Award (2018); Mullard Award (1998)
- Scientific career
- Fields: Quantum mechanics Theoretical chemistry
- Workplaces: Physical and Theoretical Chemistry Laboratory, Oxford.
- Thesis: Electronic spectra of simple molecules (1964)
- Doctoral advisor: Richard F. Barrow
- Website: www.chem.ox.ac.uk/people/graham-richards

William Graham Richards (1 October 1939 – 11 February 2025) was an English chemist and Fellow of Brasenose College, Oxford. He served as head of the department of chemistry at the University of Oxford from 1997 to 2006.

Richards was a pioneer in the field of computer-aided molecular design, in particular its application to the pharmaceuticals industry. He was the founding scientist of Oxford Molecular Ltd., and introduced a novel model for the funding of research at Oxford University, which has been copied elsewhere. Richards was one of the scientific co-founders of Oxford Molecular Limited (OMG). The company developed software for modelling of small molecules and proteins, and drug design. Benefiting from the economic and legal changes, the company was floated on the London Stock Exchange in 1992, making the university £10 million. The company was worth £450 million at its peak but was eventually sold for £70 million. Richards published more than 300 scientific papers, including 15 books.

== Education ==
Graham Richards was born on 1 October 1939 in Hoylake, England, to Percy Richards and Gwendoline Julia Richards (née Evans). Both parents were of Welsh extraction. Richards was educated at Birkenhead School. He won a scholarship to Brasenose College, Oxford, starting his studies there in 1958.

He received his bachelor's degree in Chemistry with first class honours from the University of Oxford in 1961. He then studied the electronic spectroscopy of diatomic molecules with Richard F. Barrow, earning his Master of Arts and Doctor of Philosophy degrees from the University of Oxford in 1964.

== Career and research ==
After his DPhil, Richards continued his spectroscopic work with fellowships in Oxford (ICI Research Fellowship, Junior Research Fellowship at Balliol College) and Paris, France (Centre de Mécanique Ondulatoire Appliquée).

He soon returned to Oxford as a research fellow at Balliol College, Oxford (1964–1966), before being elected to a Fellowship in Chemistry at Brasenose College (1966–2007), his alma mater. He was promoted to a lecturer at Oxford University (1966–1994), to reader (1994–1996), and to professor (1996–2007). He served as chairman of the chemistry department from 1997 to 2006. Richards celebrated his formal retirement from the University of Oxford on 18 May 2007.

=== Industry involvement ===
In the fourth year of his degree course Richards' research project led him to using Oxford's Ferranti Mercury computer to solve integrals. During a fellowship year in France at Centre de Mécanique Ondulatoire Appliquée, he was able to use more powerful computers. Returning to Oxford, he worked on ab initio computations and applied computational techniques to solving quantum mechanical problems in theoretical chemistry, in particular studying spin-orbit coupling.

His influential paper Third age of quantum chemistry (1979) marked the development of computational techniques for theoretical analysis whose precision equaled or surpassed experimental results.

"The work represents perhaps a near perfect instance of theory being in harmony with experiment, each aspect vital to the other and the combination much more than the sum of the separate parts." – Graham Richards

Richards saw the potential to apply computer techniques for examining the structure and properties of compounds in the area of pharmaceutical applications. He became a pioneer in the field of computer-aided molecular design. He was the first to produce coloured images modelling molecular structure graphically, and introduced many of the techniques now widely used in academia and industry.

In 1982, Richards became a founding member of the Molecular Graphics Society (now the Molecular Graphics and Modelling Society, MGMS). The society started the Journal of Molecular Graphics in 1983. He served as the editor-in-chief of the journal from 1984 to 1996. The journal's name changed to Journal of Molecular Graphics and Modelling in 1997.

In 1989, Richards was the scientific co-founder (with Tony Marchington, David Ricketts, James Hiddleston, and Anthony Rees) of Oxford Molecular Limited. The company developed software for modelling of small molecules and proteins, and drug design.

The company was possible in part because of economic and legal changes under the government of Margaret Thatcher that enabled British universities to become involved with venture capital and technology transfer. As Oxford Molecular Group, Ltd. (OMG) the company was floated on the London Stock Exchange in 1992, making the university £10 million. The company was worth £450 million at its peak but was eventually sold for £70 million. It was one of several companies that combined to form Accelrys in 2001.

Richards was instrumental in raising £64 million to fund a new laboratory for Oxford University through an innovative funding approach. £20 million worth of funding began with an "unusual collaboration" between Richards and David Norwood. Norwood then arranged for Beeson-Gregory to provide £20 million in exchange for half the University's equity share of any spin-out companies emanating from the Chemistry Department for 15 years. In 2003, Beeson-Gregory and Evolution Group merged, later creating a subsidiary, IP2IPO ("Intellectual property to initial public offering"). Richards became a non-executive director of IP2IPO in 2001, and non-executive chairman of IP2IPO in 2004.

Through this arrangement the Chemistry Department has contributed over £100 million to the University of Oxford.

Richards served as a director of ISIS Innovation Ltd., the University of Oxford's technology transfer company. It became Oxford University Innovation as of June 2016. It has brought around 60 spin-out companies into existence.

The Financial Times has described the approach as "the way universities should be financed in the future".

Richards also introduced the use of distributed computing in pharmaceutical design. Started in 2000, his Screensaver Lifesaver project exploited idle time on more than 3.5 million personal computers in over 200 countries, whose owners agreed to be involved and downloaded the project's screensaver. Using idle time from these computers, the project's software created a virtual supercomputer that screened billions of compounds against protein targets, searching for possible drug treatments for cancer, anthrax and smallpox. The project involved collaboration between Intel, United Devices, and the Centre for Computational Drug Discovery at the University of Oxford, headed by Richards and funded by the National Foundation for Cancer Research (NFCR).

Richards formed the spin-out company InhibOx Ltd. in 2001. InhibOx applied cloud computing techniques to computational chemistry and drug discovery, and developed a searchable database of small-molecules called Scopius. In 2002, Richards donated his shares, twenty-five per cent of the company, to the National Foundation for Cancer Research. In 2017, InhibOx relaunched as Oxford Drug Design Ltd., with a new focus on antibiotic discovery.

As of 2011 Richards joined the Science Advisory Panel of Oxford Medical Diagnostics. He was a non-executive director of IP Group plc, having also served as its chairman.

== Personal life and death ==
Richards married his first wife, Jessamy Kershaw, on 12 December 1970. She died of cancer in November 1988. On 5 October 1996, Richards married Mary Elizabeth Phillips, director of research planning at University College London. He had two sons and three stepchildren. Richards died on 11 February 2025, at the age of 85.

=== Selected books ===
- Richards, W. G. (1976). "Quantum pharmacology". Endeavour. 8 (4) (1st ed.). London; Boston: Butterworths: 172–8. doi:10.1016/0160-9327(84)90081-4. ISBN 978-0-408-70950-7. PMID 6210194.
- Richards, W. Graham (1986). The problems of chemistry. Oxford: Oxford University Press. ISBN 978-0-19-219191-5.
- Richards, W. Graham, ed. (1989). Computer-aided molecular design. London: IBC Technical Services. ISBN 978-0-89573-738-0.
- Grant, Guy H.; Richards, W. Graham (1995). Computational chemistry (1st ed.). Oxford [England]: Oxford University Press. ISBN 978-0-19-855740-1.
- Richards, W. Graham (2008). Spin-outs : creating businesses from university intellectual property (PDF). Petersfield, Hampshire: Harriman House. ISBN 978-1-905641-98-7.
- Richards, Graham (2011). 50 years at Oxford. Bloomington, IN: AuthorHouse. ISBN 978-1-4567-7861-3.

=== Awards and honours ===
Richards was a council member of the Royal Society of Chemistry and of the Royal Institution, and a Fellow of the Royal Society, and was appointed Commander of the Order of the British Empire (CBE) in the 2001 Birthday Honours for services to Chemistry. The Times Higher Education Supplement (2006) considered Richards to be one of twelve academic "super-earners" in the United Kingdom. Times magazine's first Eureka issue (2010) included Richards in its list of the top 100 British scientists. Richards' work has been acknowledged through a number of more formal awards and honours, including:

- 2018, Fellow of the Royal Society (FRS)
- 2018, Richard J. Bolte Sr. Award by the Science History Institute
- 2017, Honorary Fellow of the Royal Society of Chemistry (HonFRSC)
- 2011, Fellow of the Learned Society of Wales
- 2010, Co-Vice-President of the Royal Society of Chemistry
- 2004, Award of the American Chemical Society for Computers in Chemical and Pharmaceutical Research
- 2001, Commander of the Order of the British Empire, Queen's Birthday Honours
- 1996, The Lord Lloyd of Kilgerran Award, Foundation for Science and Technology
- 1998, Mullard Award, Royal Society
- 1972, Marlow Medal, Royal Society of Chemistry
