= Wahaj =

Wahaj is an arms manufacturing company in Saudi Arabia. Wahaj has premises in Riyadh's Second Industrial City. Wahaj is also known as Saudi Advanced Technologies Company.

== History ==
Wahaj was established in 2013 as a joint venture between Saudi International Petrochemical Company (SIPCHEM) and a member of the South Korean Hanwha Group. The shares are split in a 3:1 ratio.

In 2017 Wahaj built 18 jigs for the BAE Systems Hawk jet. The jigs were the first collaboration of Wahaj and the Saudi subsidiary of BAE Systems.

On 1 March 2018 Wahaj partnered with Lockheed Martin to build Paveway II Plus laser-guided bombs. The bombs would be used on Saudi Arabia’s F-15s, F-16s and Panavia Tornados. When the plant is operational 70% of the bombs were to be locally-built.

In 2019 Wahaj and the Rafaut Group signed a contract to build aviation manufacturing facilities in Saudi Arabia.

In 2021 Wahaj partnered with Honeywell Aviation to manufacture aerospace parts for civilian aircraft.

In October 2023 Wahaj chose to partner with the IFS AB subsidiary so as to secure its IT needs.

In February 2024 Milrem Robotics demonstrated their THeMIS UGV which was equipped with a Wahaj SCORPION remote-control dual gun system.

In February 2024 Nexter signed an agreement with Wahaj that they would together develop a guided shell for use with the 156 CAESAR artillery delivery systems that were on order by the Saudi government, which had established more stringent precision standards than normal. The state-of-the-art ordnance systems used GPS and IMU; the newly-specified "Sabir" system would add a (drone-mounted) laser pointer feature and have a range of 60 km. In addition, the Saudis prize the ITAR-free status of their new shells.

As of February 2024, Wahaj was able to brag about 100% Saudi-made defense systems.
