= YSD-11-class crane ship =

Type of United States World War II ship

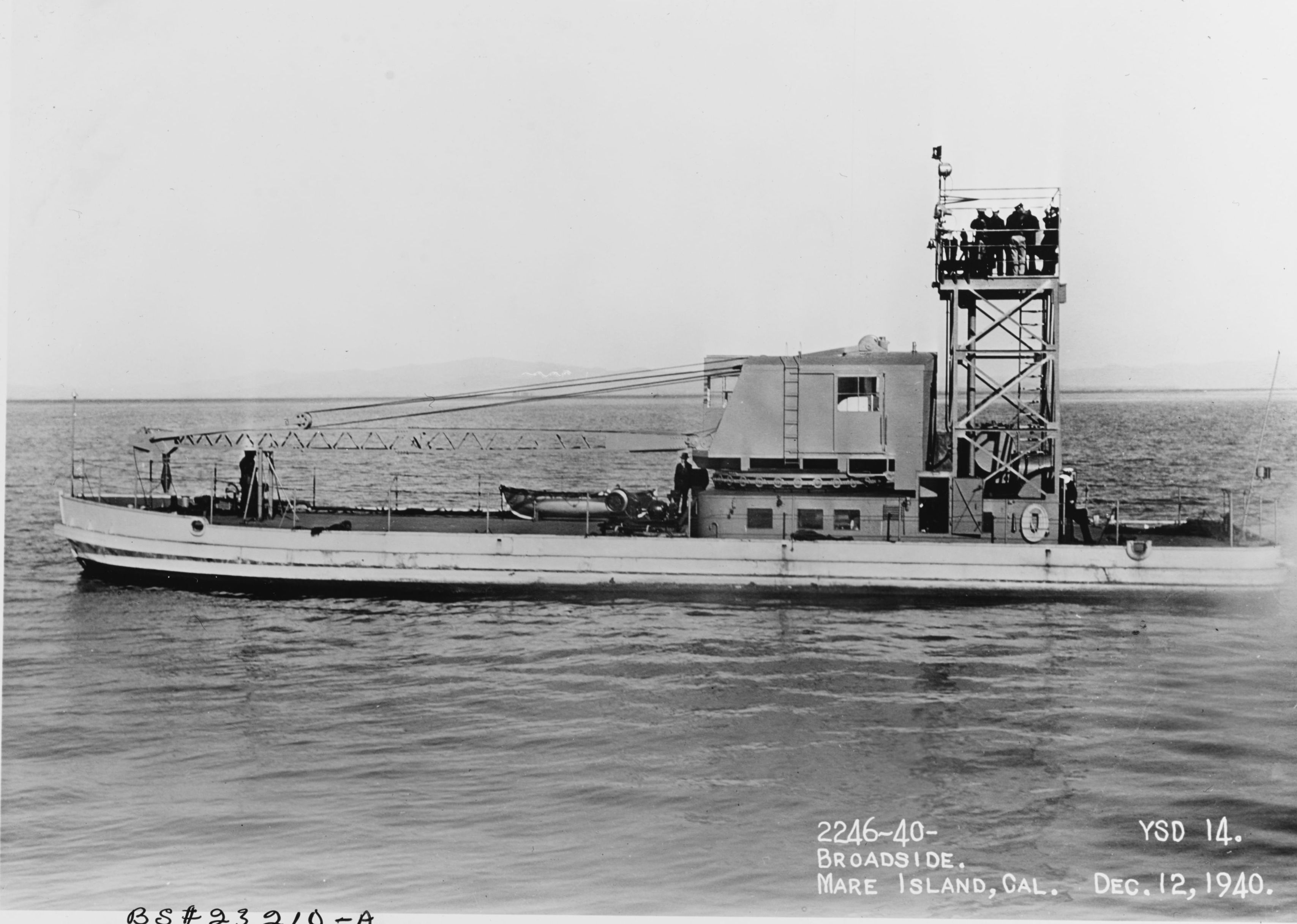
Seaplane Wrecking Derrick YSD-14

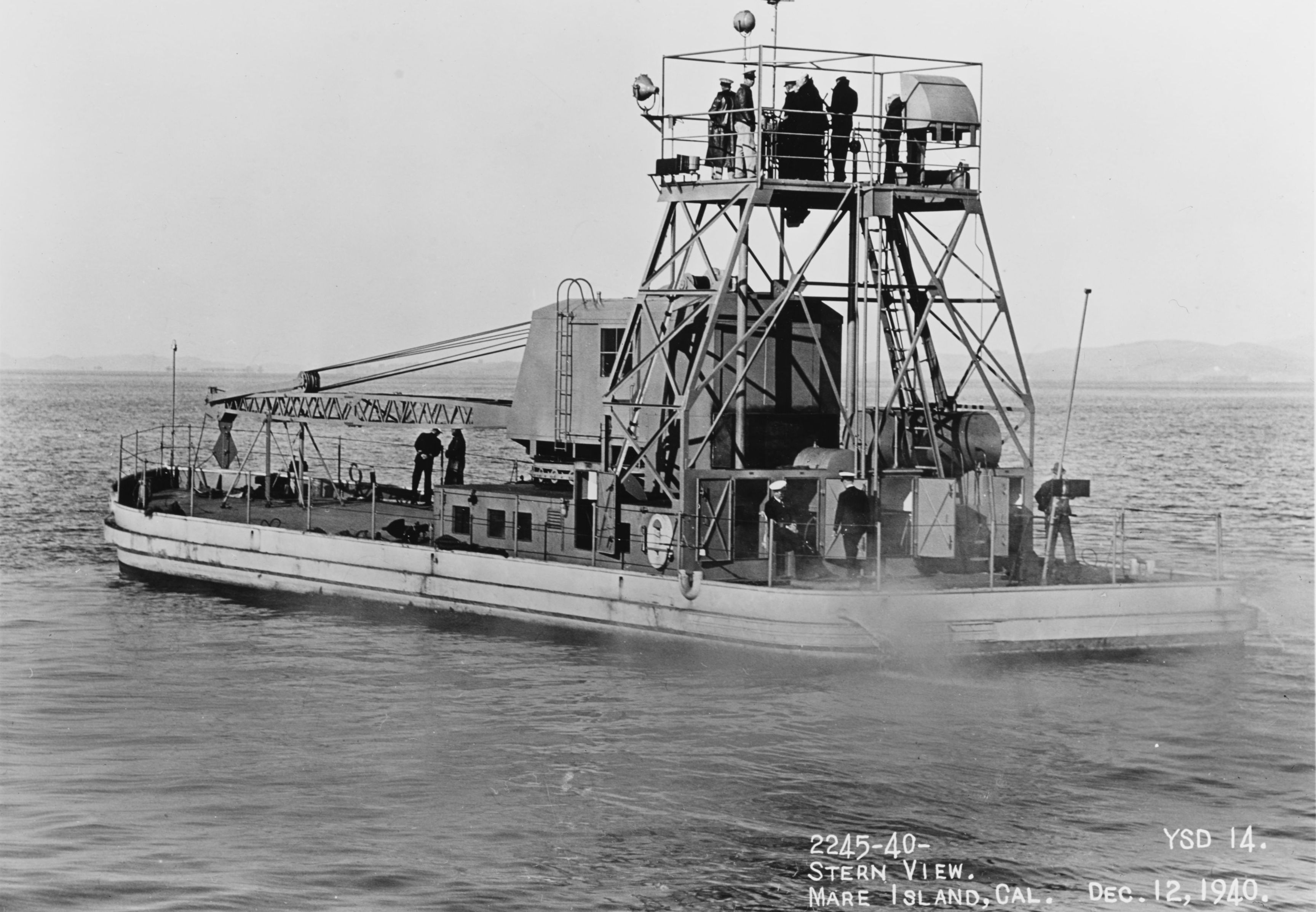
Seaplane Wrecking Derrick YSD-14

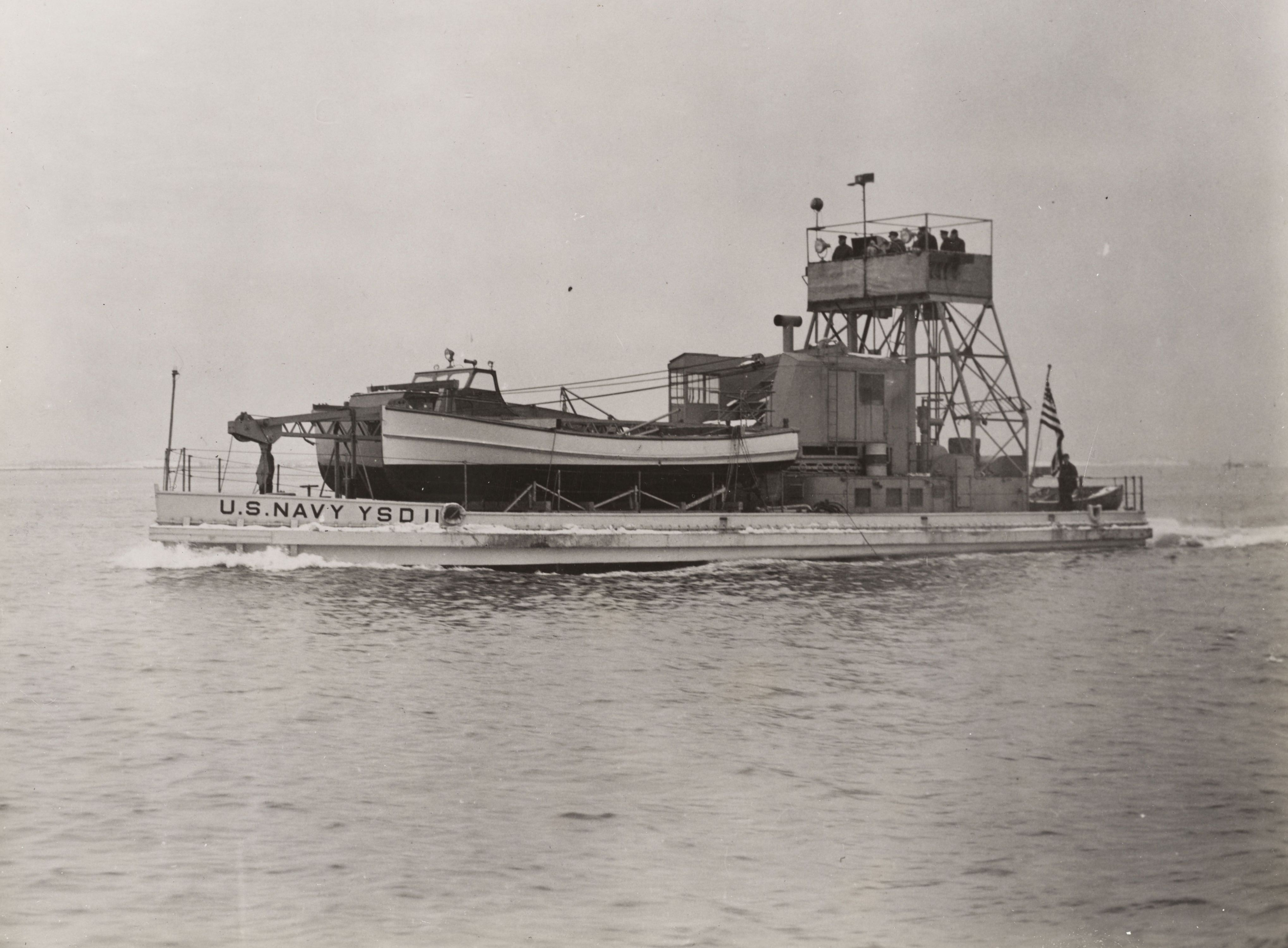
Seaplane Wrecking Derrick YSD-11, in 1940

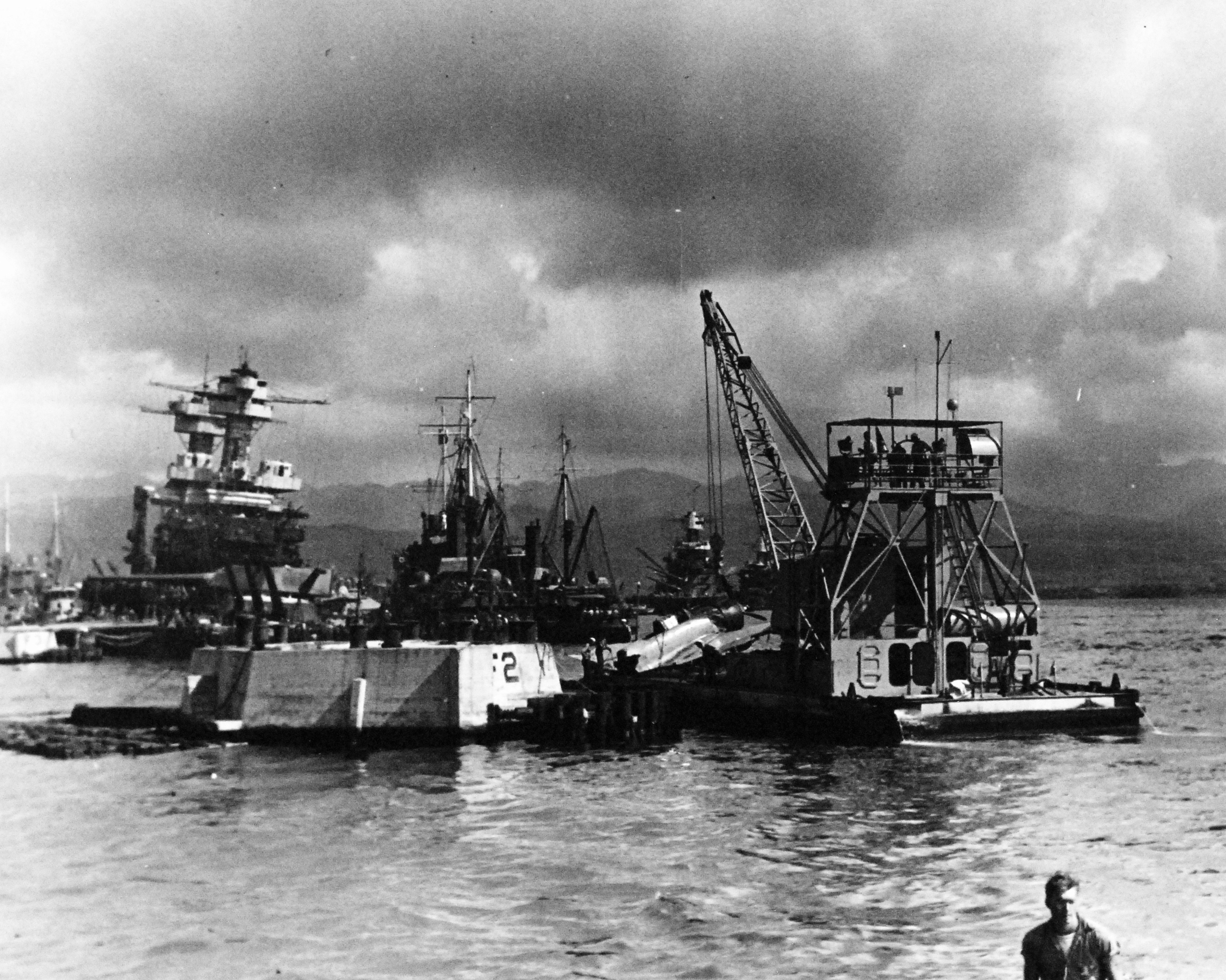
YSD-19 a Mary Ann recovering the wreckage of Japanese Aichi D3A Val dive bomber that crashed in the water at Ford Island Berth F-2 during Pearl Harbor attack, Dec. 1941.

YSD-11 Class Seaplane Wrecking Derrick is a class of US Navy derrick crane ship. While listed to service seaplanes the crane was able to lift small boats and large engines also. Hull classification symbol YSD is for Yard Seaplane Dirrick, Yard as in ship repair yard. YSD-11s were used to remove broken seaplanes from the water for repair or regular maintenance. The US had 2,661 Consolidated PBY Catalina built for the war, Canada built 620. Other seaplanes built in mass production were the 1,366 Martin PBM Mariner, 749 Short Sunderland and 345 Grumman G-21 Goose. The YSD-11 Class Derrick was built to support naval operations during World War II, having a displacement of 220 tons no load and 270 tons loaded. The YSD-11 Class had a length of 104 feet; a beam of 31 feet and 2 inches; a draft of 4 feet. They had a top speed 10 knots, built with a steel hull. The ship had one American Hoist & Derrick model 685 rotating crane. The crane had a boom of 54 feet with a lifting capacity of 10 tons. The crane was powered by a 6-cylinder Cummins Diesel engine. The ship housed a crew of one Officer and 15 Enlisted men. The ships had a diving gear locker for the crew salvage work. For service power, the ship had two generators: one 30 kW Diesel engine to electric generator and one 20 kW Diesel Generator. Ship power was from two Superior model MRDB-8 200 HP Diesel engines with two propellers, 640shp. The YSD-11 Class Derricks were built by a number of United States shipyards, including Moore Equipment Company, Puget Sound Navy Yard, Charleston Navy Yard, Mare Island Naval Shipyard, Soule Steel Company, Pearl Harbor Navy Yard and Boston Navy Yard.

== Moore Equipment Company ==
Moore Equipment Company in Stockton, California built YSD-11 Class Seaplane, Wrecking Derrick:

Name	Built	Notes
YSD 35	1943	Worked 17th Naval District, accidentally lost, 16 May 1946
YSD 36	1943	Lost on 9 August 1946 off Okinawa
YSD 37	1943	Lost off Eniwetok 10 December 1946
YSD 42	1943	lost off Guam May 1976
YSD 43	1943	Lost off Eniwetok October 1946
YSD 44	1943	
YSD 45	1943	
YSD 46	1943	To National Defense Reserve Fleet (NDRF) in 1974
YSD 47	1943	
YSD 48	1943	Typhoon Louise at Okinawa, 9 October 1945, Lost
YSD 49	1943	
YSD 50	1943	

== Boston Navy Yard ==
Built by Boston Navy Yard in Boston, Massachusetts:

Name	Built	Notes
YSD 11	15-Nov-40	scrapped in the 1980s
YSD 20	6-Mar-41	Foundered in Gulf of Mexico on 3 August 1963
YSD 22	14-Feb-41	To Army Corps of Engineers in 1972 renamed Fry, Sold in 2013
YSD 23	15-Feb-41	Sold to Schultz Contracting Corp. of Miami, FL renamed Mary King (ON 284675) in 1961

== Charleston Naval Shipyard ==
Charleston Naval Shipyard in Charleston, South Carolina built:

Name	Built	Notes
YSD 10	1933	Sold to Dravo Corp. in Pittsburgh, PA, renamed Dravo 45 (ON 286374) in 1961, sold to Trinity Marine, Baton Rouge, LA renamed PA 45
YSD 12	1933	To Army Corps of Engineers as Toro in 1947 at Mobile, AL, sold to American Commercial Lines, Jeffersonville, IN, as Toro (ON 561176) in 1974. Foundered in off New Orleans on 20 March 1999.
YSD 13	1933	To Army Corps of Engineers as Belmont in 1960, scrapped by Navy on 8 July 1994
YSD 16	1933	Worked 10th Naval District, in NOB Trinidad during WW2, sold in 1966 to Miss Agnes Corp., Miami, FL as Miss Agnes (ON 512147), sold to Fred B. Carlisle, Miami, FL as Miss Agnes in 1975.
YSD 21	1941	Worked 10th Naval District in WW2, after war transferred to other Government agency and sold in 1975
YSD 33	1943	worked 8th Naval District for WW2, struck from Navy 1 June 1974, sold 1 December 1974 to Production Aggregate & Gravel, Orange, TX, (ON 587827) in 1977
YSD 34	1943	Worked 1st Naval District for WW2, struck from the Navy on 15 April 1974, sold for scrapping 1979
YSD 59	1943	Worked Sixth Naval District for WW2, transferred to Army renamed Merritt on 18 August 1960, converted to dredge in 1964
YSD 70	1943	
YSD 71	1943	
YSD 72	1943	
YSD 73	1943	

== Puget Sound Naval Shipyard ==
Puget Sound Naval Shipyard in Bremerton, Washington built:

Name	Built	Notes
YSD 15	1933	worked in Seattle for Navy, 10 April 1984 moved to work at NDRF Olympia, WA, as service craft, to NDRF Suisun Bay as FS 6 struck in 1984.
YSD 18	1933	Navy sold to Madjic & Sons, Kodiak, AK as Barb M. II (ON 598253) in 1977, renamed Maxine M. in 2009, renamed Mary B. in 2013, working in Kodiak, AK.
YSD 24	1941	Navy sold in 1960 to Harvey Aluminum Inc., Torrance, CA, later renamed Seahorse working in Pacific Northwest.
YSD 25	1941	Navy sold in 1974, to International Marine Constructors, Santa Barbara (ON 564392) in 1975, Sold to Ocean Systems, Inc., Santa Barbara as D/B Samson in 1977, scrapped in 2007. Scrapped 1974
YSD 26	1941	To US Army as Coyote in 1975, Sold in the 2000s.

== Mare Island Naval Shipyard ==
Mare Island Naval Shipyard in Vallejo, California built:

Name	Built	Notes
YSD 29	1941	Worked 11th Naval District for WW2, Struck from Navy 1 November 1970, sold at Long Beach, CA on 30 June 1971
YSD 30	1941	Worked 14th Naval District for WW2, towed to Pearl Harbor by Sirius (AK-15) from 21 July to 3 August 1942, worked NAS Palmyra Island from 1942 to 1946. Foundered under tow from Palmyra on 8 December 1946.
YSD 31	1941	worked 13th Naval District at NAS Astoria and 17th Naval District at NOB Adak for WW2, struck 29 September 1947, To War Shipping Administration for sale 10 March 1948, Sold to Manson Construction & Engineering Co., Seattle, WA, as Manson Derrick 4 (ON 267655) in 1954. Sold to Vulcan, Juneau, AK renamed Vulcan in 1978

== Pearl Harbor Naval Shipyard ==
Pearl Harbor Naval Shipyard, in Honolulu, Hawaii built:

Name	Built	Notes
YSD 17	1933	Worked the 14th Naval District at Pearl Harbor for WW2, renamed FS 62 in 1956 worked in NDRF Suisun Bay 1956- to 1975. Sold to William H. Weber DBA Omni Mechanical Services, Long Beach, CA, renamed Geronimo (ON 585061) in 1977. Abandoned on Terminal Island, CA in 2008, wreckage removed in 2017
YSD 19	1933	Worked the 14th Naval District for WW2 in Pearl Harbor and Midway. Sold as MPE 19 (ON 504318) in 1966. Sold to Mexico port in 1974. YSD-19 earned one battle star for WW2.
YSD 27	1941	Worked Fourteenth Naval District in WW2, in repair of battleships at Pearl Harbor. then to Johnston Island, then Eniwetok in 1944, then to Tenth Naval District at Roosevelt Roads in 1946. Struck from Navy 1 August 1971, sold 24 August 1972 to White Star Management, Miami, FL, as El Tuto (ON 580093)
YSD 32	1942	Reclassified YSR-8 before completion, to help with the salvage of ships after Pearl Harbor attack, worked with 14th Naval District, Struck Navy 1 May 1967. YSD a Class of Sludge Removal Barge.
YSD 55	1943	Worked 14th Naval District on battleships at Pearl Harbor 1942 - 1945, became Ferryboat YFB-84 in 1964. Struck Navy 1 August 1969, sold in 1971, scrapped in 1974
YSD 74	1943	
YSD 75	1943	

== Soule Steel Company ==
Soule Steel Company in San Francisco built. (Bridge and building builder):

- YSD 60 Worked 17th Naval District for WW2, remove Navy 1 December 1977, transferred to the City of Long Beach, CA, 15 December 1999, abandoned on Terminal Island in 2008.
- YSD 61 Worked 13th Naval District at Whidbey Island, remove Navy and sold on 27 October 1960 to Western Marine Construction, Inc., Seattle, WA, (ON 284150) in 1961, abandoned on Snohomish River in 2011.
- YSD 62 Worked Roi, Kwajalein for WW2, move from Kwajalein to Pearl Harbor aboard Whetstone (LSD-27) in 1947. removed by 1967.
- YSD 63 Worked din Guam and Saipan for WW2, worked Subic Bay, remove from Navy 16 July 1993.
- YSD 64, became Sandcaster YM-31. Worked Fourteenth Naval District at Pearl Harbor, to Ulithi in 1945, Towed to Kerama Retto, Okinawa by (ARS-16) in 1945, worked Fourteenth Naval District to 1955, worked as Service Craft Unit 1 for diving school at Pearl in 1958, made YM-31 in 1968, rename Sandcaster on 14 December 1968. worked Vietnam, hit Mine on Cua Viet River, Vietnam with 7 Vietnam crew killed on 25 February 1971, remove Navy on 1 September 1972. scrap on 21 February 1973.
- YSD 65 Worked 13th Naval District at NAS Tongue Point, removed Navy on 15 June 1974, sold 7 April 1975 to William H. Weber, Long Beach, CA, as Hiawatha (ON 565326) in 1976, out of service in 2005

== Omaha Steel Works ==
Omaha Steel Works in Omaha, Nebraska built (Bridge builder, the only ships built):

- YSD 66 Worked 7th Naval District at NAS Miami, moved to Port Everglades, Fl, worked BuAer harbor detection experiments, removed Navy 15 October 1944, transfer to other government agencies on 8 February 1975.
- YSD 67 Thru Panama Canal as cargo on ARDC-12 in February 1945, worked 13th Naval District at NAS Seattle in WW2, removed Navy on 15 February 1973, to US Air Force in 1973, to Army Corps of Engineers in 1974 as M/V Puget.
- YSD 68 Worked 7th Naval District at Fort Pierce, FL for WW2, foundered off North Carolina on 24 September 1952.
- YSD 69 Worked 6th Naval District for WW2, removed Navy 1 June 1974, sold to Seacraft, Groves, TX, on 4 December 1974. Sold to Production Aggregate & Gravel, Inc., Port Arthur, TX (ON 587828) in 1977.

== Missouri Valley Bridge and Iron Company ==
Missouri Valley Bridge & Iron Co. in Leavenworth, Kansas built:

- YSD 76 Worked in Reserve Fleet, Green Cove Springs, FL in November 1945, moved to Naval Ordnance Test Lab Facility, Fort Monroe, VA, in 1960. Moved to Naval Diving Unit at Norfolk, VA in 1970. Removed Navy 1 January 1971. Sold for scrap at Portsmouth, VA, 16 January 1971
- YSD 77 Removed Navy 15 November 1983, to another government agency on 11 May 1984
- YSD 78 Worked Sixth Naval District at Charleston, SC, removed from Navy to Army as dredge/snagboat, as Snell on 15 August 1960, sold to ACE's Wilmington District.

== Other YSD Wrecking Derrick ==
YSD - Seaplane Wrecking Derricks were given the US Navy nickname Mary Annes because of their resemblance to the character in the children's book Mike Mulligan and His Steam Shovel by Virginia Lee Burton.

- YSD-1 90 tons, 60 feet, beam 40 feet, lifting 13,000 pounds built Charleston Navy Yard in 1916.
- YSD-2 76 feet built at New Orleans Naval Station
- YSD-3 not built.
- YSD 4, 87 feet, 5 ton lift, built in 1920 at Mare Island
- YSD-5 not built.
- YSD-6 50 feet, 2 ton lift, built at William I. Huffstetler, Miami, FL
- YSD-7 104 feet built at York Navy Yard, Brooklyn, NY
- YSD-8 104 feet, built in 1931 at Portsmouth Navy Yard, Portsmouth, NH
- YSD 9, 104 feet 240 tons built in 1933 in Pearl Harbor Naval Shipyard
- YSD 10 14o feet 240 tons built in 1933 at Charleston Navy Yard, Charleston

== See also ==
- Emergency Shipbuilding program
- List of shipbuilders and shipyards
- California during World War II
- Maritime history of California
