= Soule Steel Company =

Defunct American manufacturing company

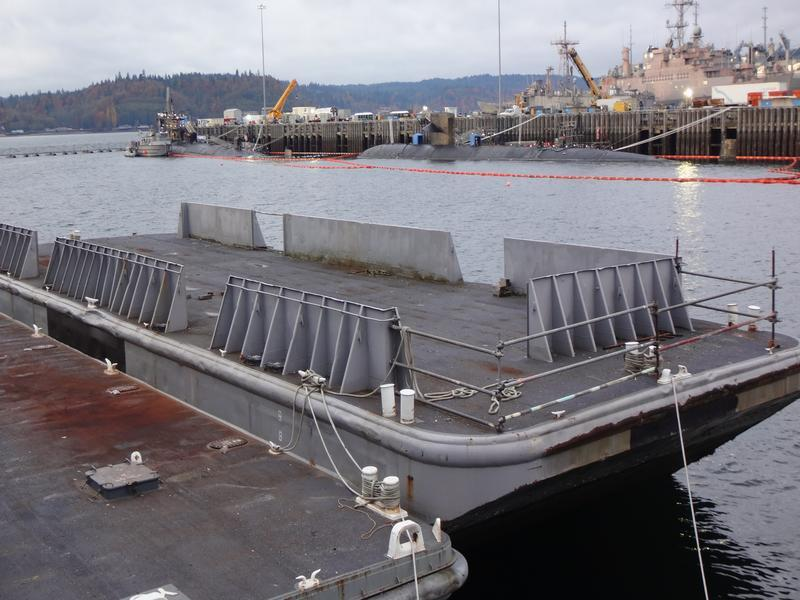
YC 1073 Barge (non-self-propelled) built in 1945 by Soule Steel

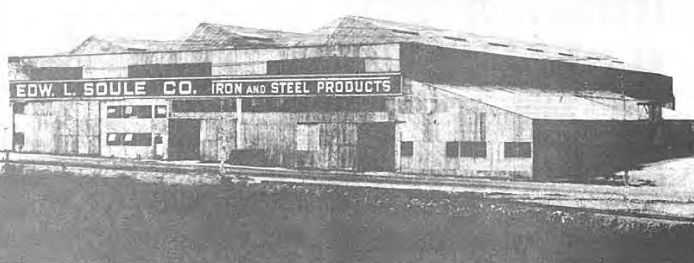
Edw. L Soulé Company's main office on Army street in San Francisco, California in 1923

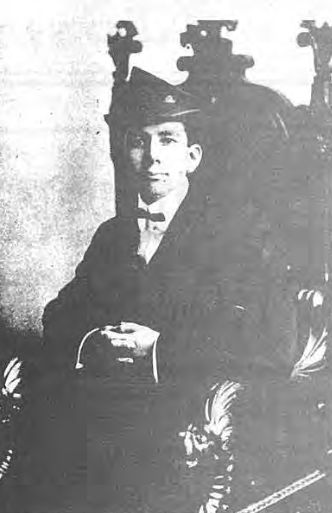
Edward L Soulé founder of Soulé Steel Company in 1905

Soule Steel Company was a manufacturer of fabricated steel building products. The main office was in San Francisco, California, with branch offices in Los Angeles, California, Portland, Oregon, and Seattle, Washington. Soule Steel worked on major construction projects like: the reinforcing steel on the footings for the Golden Gate Bridge, California Memorial Stadium at University of California, Berkeley, San Francisco high rises buildings, Los Angeles Memorial Coliseum, Vincent Thomas Bridge, Space Needle and the Grand Coulee Dam. During World War II, Soule Steel built landing craft, steel barges, and YSD-11-class crane ships in the Terminal Island shipyard. Soule Steel also built some tuna fishing ships after the war.

== History ==
Soule Steel was started by Edward Soulé in 1911. Edward Soulé was a civil engineer in San Francisco and saw the damage done by the 1906 San Francisco earthquake. So, in 1911 started a steel rebar business, called Edw. L Soulé Company to help make new buildings stronger. The company name was changed in 1927 to Soule Steel Company. The family-owned business grew and at its peak had nine 9 fabrication shops, a steel mill (1959 in Long Beach, California), a division for building steel buildings, and a steel window and doors division. Edw. L Soulé retired in 1945 and Stanley Soul continued the company, and later Edward Lee Soule Jr. (1917–2003) and his brothers: Howard Stephen Soule (1924–2010), Lee Soule and Peter Soule. Soule Steel and Zamil Steel founded a joint venture in 1930. Soule family was also a family of philanthropy and gave to many charities. Soule Steel closed in 1986. The San Francisco plant and Portland plant are now business centers. The Wilmington Ave Los Angeles plant is now The Plaza Americana. The Seattle plant is now Ferguson Plumbing warehouse. The Phoenix site is now a food court. San Jose site is a vacant lot. Fresno site is now apartments.

== Soulé Software ==
Third-generation Soule, Sandy Soule, started Soulé Software based in Valencia, California, which is also run by fourth-generation Soule, Kevin Soule. Soulé Software product is Contract management software, that also supports rebar fabrication and placers.

== Built for World War II ==
Soule Steel produced tons of rebar for the war effort.

== LCM(3) and LCM(6) ==
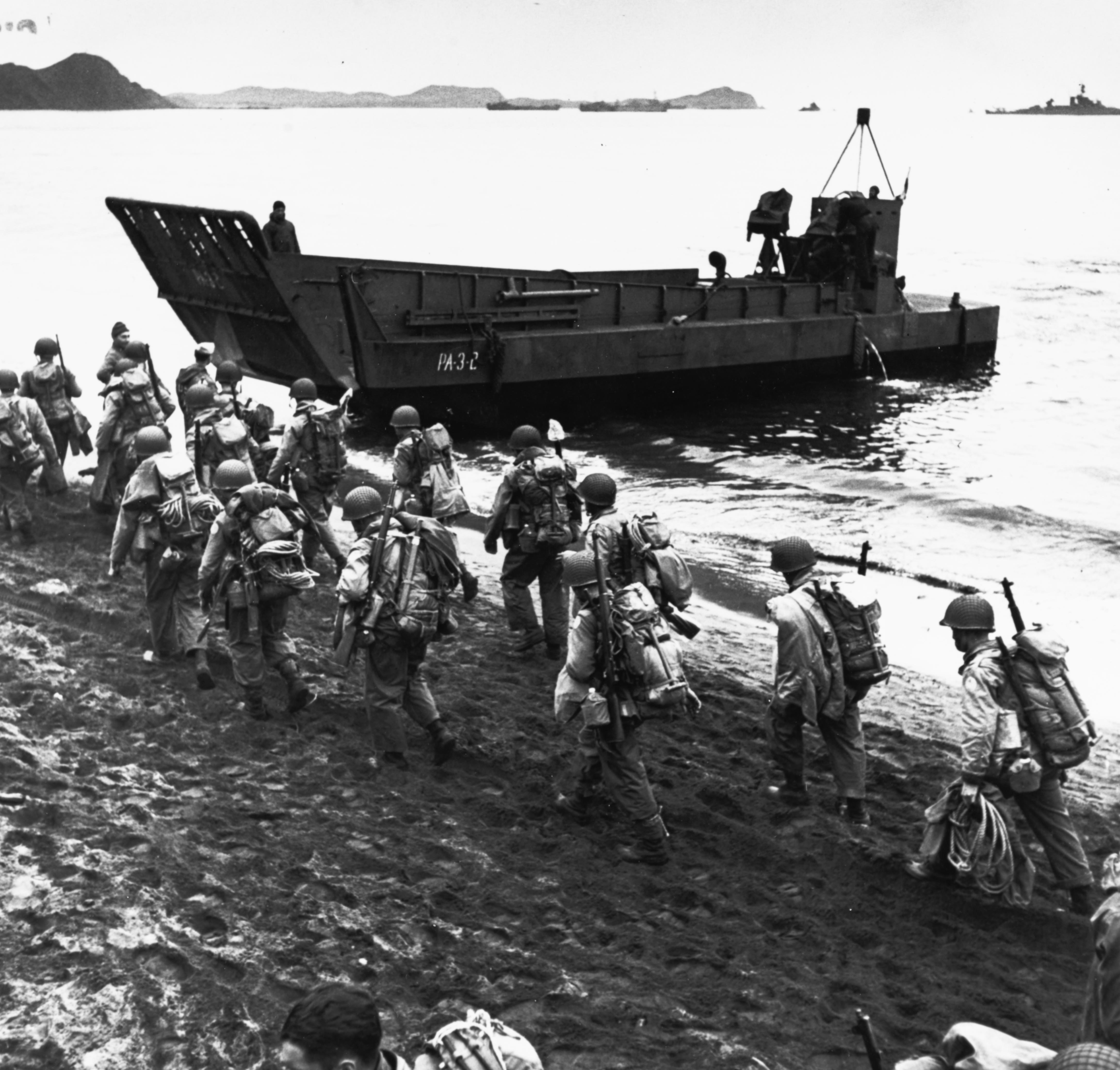
Landing Craft Mechanized in 1943

For the war Soule Steel built LCM(3) and LCM(6), these are Landing Craft Mechanized Mark 3 and Mark 6.

=== Seaplane Wrecking Derrick ===
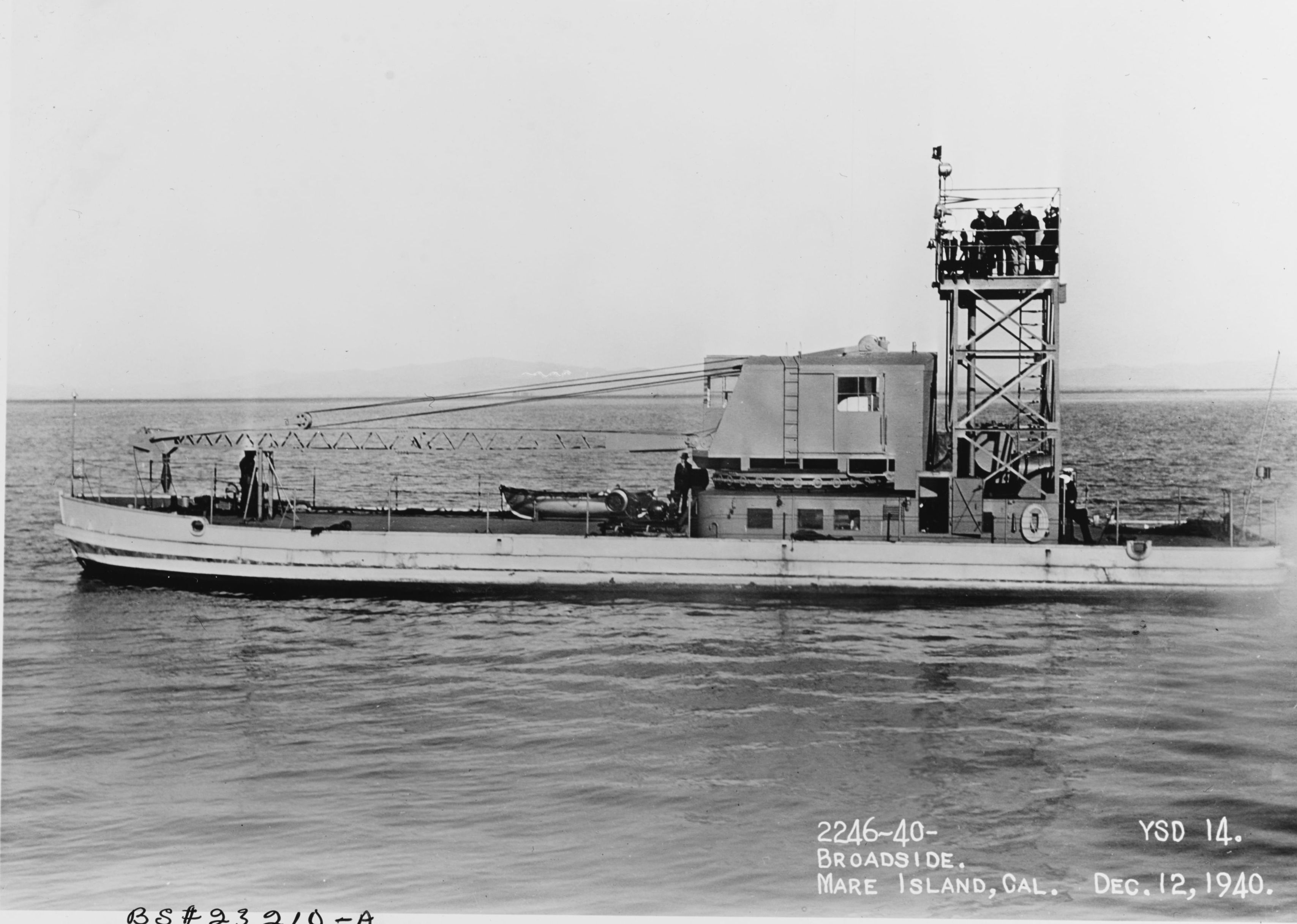
Seaplane Wrecking Derrick

Soule Steel San Francisco plant built SD-11 Class Seaplane Wrecking Derrick for the US Navy for World War 2:

- YSD 60 Worked 17th Naval District for WW2, remove Navy 1 December 1977, transferred to the City of Long Beach, CA, 15 December 1999, abandoned on Terminal Island in 2008.
- YSD 61 Worked 13th Naval District at Whidbey Island, remove Navy and sold on 27 October 1960 to Western Marine Construction, Inc., Seattle, WA, (ON 284150) in 1961, abandoned on Snohomish River in 2011.
- YSD 62 Worked Roi, Kwajalein for WW2, move from Kwajalein to Pearl Harbor aboard Whetstone (LSD-27) in 1947. removed by 1967.
- YSD 63 Worked din Guam and Saipan for WW2, worked Subic Bay, remove from Navy 16 July 1993.
- YSD 64, became Sandcaster YM-31. Worked Fourteenth Naval District at Pearl Harbor, to Ulithi in 1945, Towed to Kerama Retto, Okinawa by (ARS-16) in 1945, worked Fourteenth Naval District to 1955, worked as Service Craft Unit 1 for diving school at Pearl in 1958, made YM-31 in 1968, rename Sandcaster on 14 December 1968. worked Vietnam, hit Mine on Cua Viet River, Vietnam with 7 Vietnam crew killed on 25 February 1971, remove Navy on 1 September 1972. scrap on 21 February 1973.
- YSD 65 Worked 13th Naval District at NAS Tongue Point, removed Navy on 15 June 1974, sold 7 April 1975 to WIlliam H. Weber, Long Beach, CA, as Hiawatha (ON 565326) in 1976, out of service in 2005

=== Steel barges ===
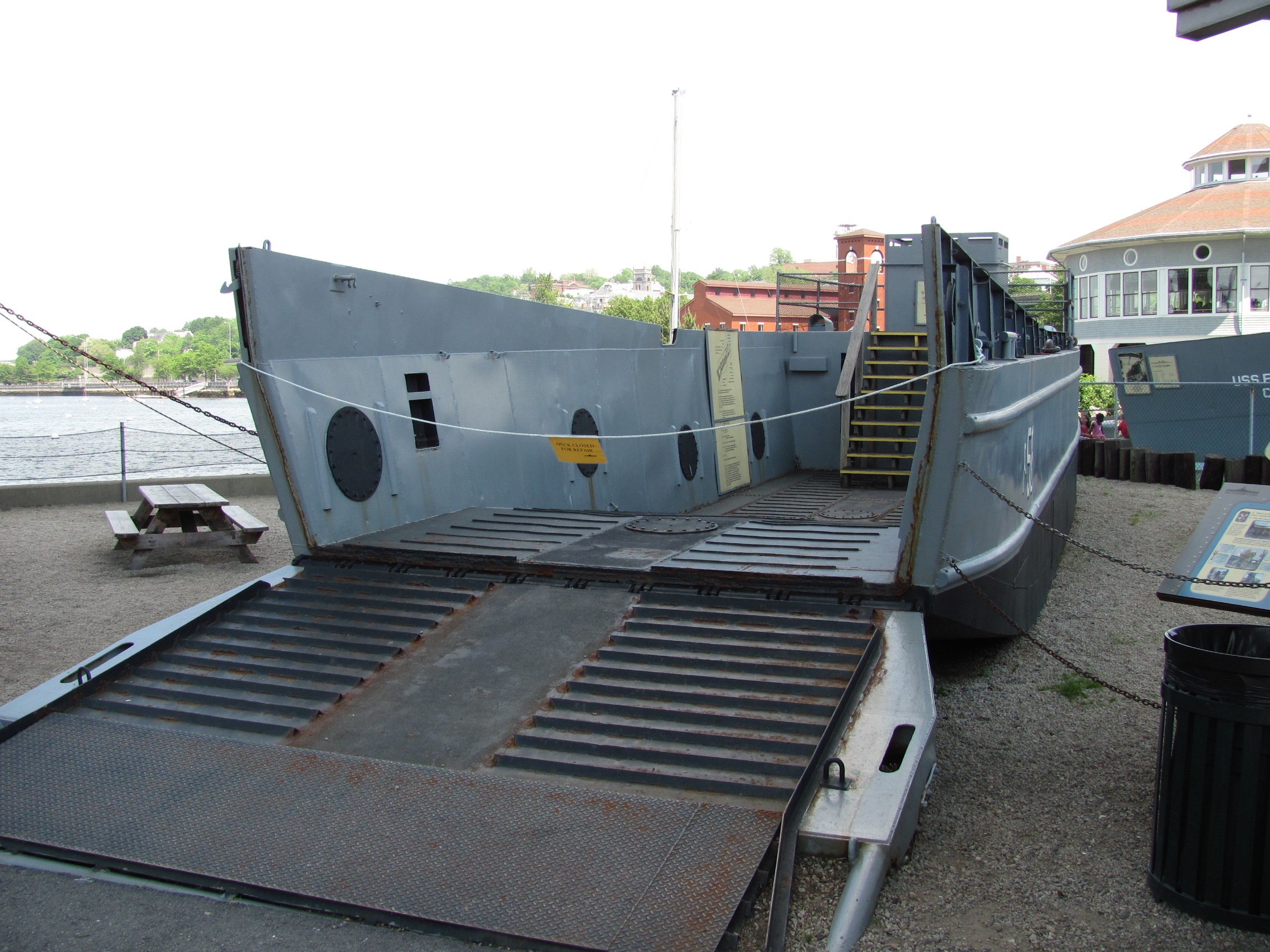
LCM-3 at Battleship Cove

Soule Steel built steel barges for the US Navy for World War 2, a Type B ship.

Hull type	Name	Type	Tons	Length	Delivered	Notes
YC	1073	Open Lighter	138	110	1945	
YC	1074	Open Lighter	138	110	1945	
YC	1075	Open Lighter	138	110	1945	
YC	1076	Open Lighter	138	110	1945	
YC	1077	Open Lighter	138	110	1945	
YC	1078	Open Lighter	138	110	1945	
YC	1079	Open Lighter	138	110	1945	Later renamed YRB 22, YR 92, sold 2005
YC	1080	Open Lighter	138	110	1945	
YC	1081	Open Lighter	138	110	1945	Scuttled off Oahu 2019
YC	1082	Open Lighter	138	110	1945	
YC	1083	Open Lighter	138	110	1945	
YC	1084	Open Lighter	138	110	1945	Later renamed YFNX 46, active
YC	1085	Open Lighter	138	110	1945	
YC	1086	Open Lighter	138	110	1945	
YC	1087	Open Lighter	138	110	1945	
YC	1088	Open Lighter	138	110	1945	
YC	1107	Open Lighter	138	110	1945	
YC	1108	Open Lighter	138	110	1945	
YC	1109	Open Lighter	138	110	1945	
YF	436	Covered Lighter	80	95	1943	Later renamed YCK 16, disposed of 1946
YF	437	Covered Lighter	75	80	1943	Later renamed YCK 17
YF	438	Covered Lighter	75	80	1943	Later renamed YCK 18, disposed of 1946
YF	439	Covered Lighter	75	80	1943	Later renamed YCK 19, disposed of 1946
YF	440	Covered Lighter	75	80	1943	Later renamed YCK 20, Later renamed YD 173
YF	441	Covered Lighter	75	80	1943	Later renamed YCK 21, disposed of 1948
YF	442	Covered Lighter	75	80	1943	Later renamed YCK 22, disposed of 1948
YCK	29	Open Lighter	75	80	1943	Disposed of 1947
YCK	30	Open Lighter	75	80	1943	Disposed of 1947
YCK	31	Open Lighter	75	80	1943	Disposed of 1947
YCK	32	Open Lighter	75	80	1943	Disposed of 1947
YCK	33	Open Lighter	75	80	1943	Disposed of 1947
YCK	34	Open Lighter	75	80	1943	Disposed of 1947
YCK	35	Open Lighter	75	80	1943	Disposed of 1947
YCK	36	Open Lighter	75	80	1943	Disposed of 1947
YCK	37	Open Lighter	75	80	1943	Lost 1945
YCK	38	Open Lighter	75	80	1943	Disposed of 1947
YCK	39	Open Lighter	75	80	1943	Lost 1945
YCK	49	Open Lighter	75	80	1943	Disposed of 1947
YCK	50	Open Lighter	75	80	1943	Disposed of 1947
YCK	51	Open Lighter	75	80	1943	Disposed of 1947
YFN	808	Covered Lighter	170	110	1943	
YFN	809	Covered Lighter	170	110	1943	
YFN	810	Covered Lighter	170	110	1943	
YFN	811	Covered Lighter	170	110	1943	
YFN	812	Covered Lighter	170	110	1943	
YFN	813	Covered Lighter	170	110	1943	To MARAD 1946

== See also ==
- California during World War II
- Maritime history of California
