= Peter Young (banker) =

American banker

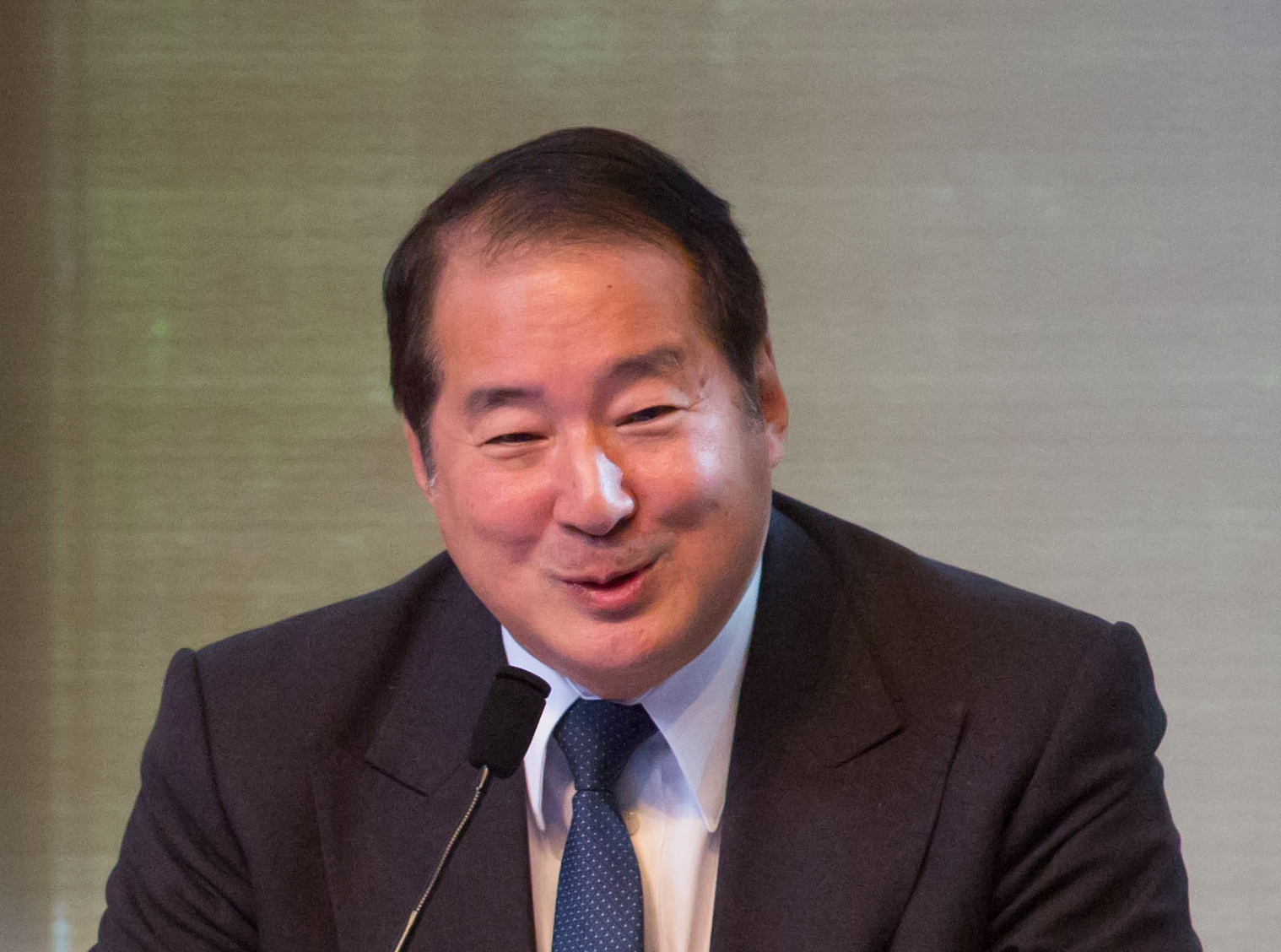
- Peter Young in 2017
- Education: Harvard Business School, New York University, Yale University
- Occupation: Banker
- Employer(s): Young & Partners LLC
- Awards: Richard J. Bolte Sr. Award 2017

Peter Young is the President and Managing Director of Young & Partners LLC, a boutique investment bank that specializes in the chemical and life sciences, working with companies for chemistry, pharmaceuticals, biotechnology, and medical devices. He has served as president of the Société de Chimie Industrielle (American Section), and is the 2017 recipient of the Richard J. Bolte Sr. Award for supporting industries.

== Education ==
Peter Young earned his M.B.A. at Harvard Business School, where he was named a Baker Scholar with Highest Distinction. Prior to that he received his M.S. in Accounting from New York University and a B.A. in Economics from Yale University. He is a Certified Public Accountant, a Chartered Global Management Accountant and is a member of the American Institute of Certified Public Accountants and the New York State Society of Certified Public Accountants.

== Career ==
Young worked with the management consulting firm Bain & Company where he advised on corporate strategy and restructuring, before moving to venture capital firm J.H. Whitney & Company. In 1986, he moved to Salomon Brothers, where he was in charge of the Chemicals section. He went on to lead the chemical section of Wertheim Schroder & Co. (later Schroders). In 1993 he was hired to lead the global chemical industry group at Lehman Brothers.

In 1996, Peter Young founded Young & Partners, which he manages.

== Awards and honors ==
Mr. Young serves on the board of the Société de Chimie Industrielle (American Section) and has been a board member since 1993. He was elected president of the board on December 16, 2015.

Young serves on the Editorial Advisory Board of Pharmaceutical Executive Magazine.

Young received the Commercial Development and Marketing Association Executive Excellence award in April 2006. He is the 2017 recipient of the Richard J. Bolte Sr. Award for supporting industries.
