= Zamil Industrial =

Saudi construction materials company

Zamil Industrial Investment Co. (Zamil Industrial)
- ISIN: SA0007879410
- Industry: Manufacturing, Construction
- Founded: July 8, 1998; 27 years ago
- Headquarters: Saudi Arabia
- Key people: Abdulla M. Al Zamil; Chairman; Ahmed Zaatari; Chief Executive Officer
- Products: Pre-engineered building, Structural steel, Air conditioning and climate control systems, telecom and transmission towers, process equipment, Precast concrete building products, Fiberglass and Rock wool Building insulation materials, and Solar power projects
- Revenue: 6.0 bn SAR (2024)
- Total assets: 4.9 bn SAR (2024)
- Number of employees: 11,000+ (2024)
- Subsidiaries: Zamil Steel, Zamil AC, ZODCON, Gulf Insulation Group.
- Website: www.zamilindustrial.com

Zamil Industrial Investment Co. (Arabic: شركة الزامل للاستثمار الصناعي), better known as Zamil Industrial (Arabic: الزامل للصناعة) is a publicly listed company based in Dammam, Saudi Arabia. Zamil Industrial is engaged in the development of various materials and equipment for use in the construction industry. Zamil Group Holding Company owns 20% of Zamil Industrial stocks, while the remaining share is owned by other companies and investors. It is listed on the Saudi Stock Exchange (Tadawul). According to Forbes Middle East, Zamil Industrial was among the top 500 companies in the Arab world in 2014.

== History ==
Originally founded as a small-size trading and real estate business by the late Sheikh Abdullah Al Hamad Al Zamil (1897-1961) in the 1930s, his sons expanded the business in the 1970s by importing and distributing air conditioners, eventually founding their company in 1974.

In 1998, Zamil Industrial was formed as a joint-stock company by merging companies that were previously fully owned by their parent company, Zamil Group Holding Company. In 2002, Zamil Industrial Investment Co. became a public company and was listed on the Saudi Stock Exchange (Tadawul) under the symbol: 2240. Through mergers and acquisitions, Zamil Industrial has grown and expanded into many countries around the world.

== Subsidiaries ==
Zamil Industrial Investment Co. owns the whole stake of the following companies, among other subsidiaries:

- Zamil Steel Pre-Engineered Buildings Company - Saudi Arabia
- Zamil Air Conditioners Holding Company - Saudi Arabia
- Arabian Stonewool Insulation Company - Saudi Arabia
- Zamil Industrial Investment Company - UAE
- Zamil Steel Buildings Company - Egypt
- Zamil Steel Buildings (Shanghai) Company - China
- Zamil Steel Buildings India Private Ltd. - India
