= Zamil Group Holding =

Saudi investment holding company

Zamil Group Holding (Arabic: شركة مجموعة الزامل القابضة) is one of the largest investment holdings in Saudi Arabia with headquarters in Al Khobar, Saudi Arabia. Several of its subsidiaries such as Zamil Steel Company, Sipchem, Zamil Industrial are publicly listed in the Saudi Arabia stock exchange.

== History ==
Zamil Group Holding was founded in 1920 in Qassim region in the Kingdom of Saudi Arabia by Sheikh Abdullah Al-Hamad Al-Zamil.

Until 1940 the company operated as a trade and services company, when it diversified into real estate.

In 1974, Zamil Group Holding started manufacturing cooling systems having established Zamil Air Conditioning under the license from Friedrich Air Conditioning Company.

In 1976, Zamil Steel Company was added to Zamil Group and in 1977, Zamil Offshore Services was founded offering engineering and construction services to offshore oil and gas platforms.

In 1998, the company established Zamil Industrial and became the first family company listed on the Saudi Arabia stock exchange.

In 1999, Zamil Group established Sipchem which was a closed joint stock company and was listed on the Saudi Stock exchange in 2006.

In 2004, the company established a petrochemical company Sahara Petrochemical and in 2019 merged with Sipchem.

In June 2010, Zamil Group Holding and Huntsman Corporation, the American petrochemical company, established an ethyleneamine plant in Jubail.

In March 2022, Zamil Offshore, a shipbuilder branch in Zamil Group Holding, joined Navantia, Spanish state-owned shipbuilding company, in building interceptors for the vessels of the Royal Saudi Navy.
