= King Abdullah Sports City Stadium =

Football stadium in Jeddah, Saudi Arabia

Coordinates: 21°45′45″N 39°09′54″E

- The Shining Jewel

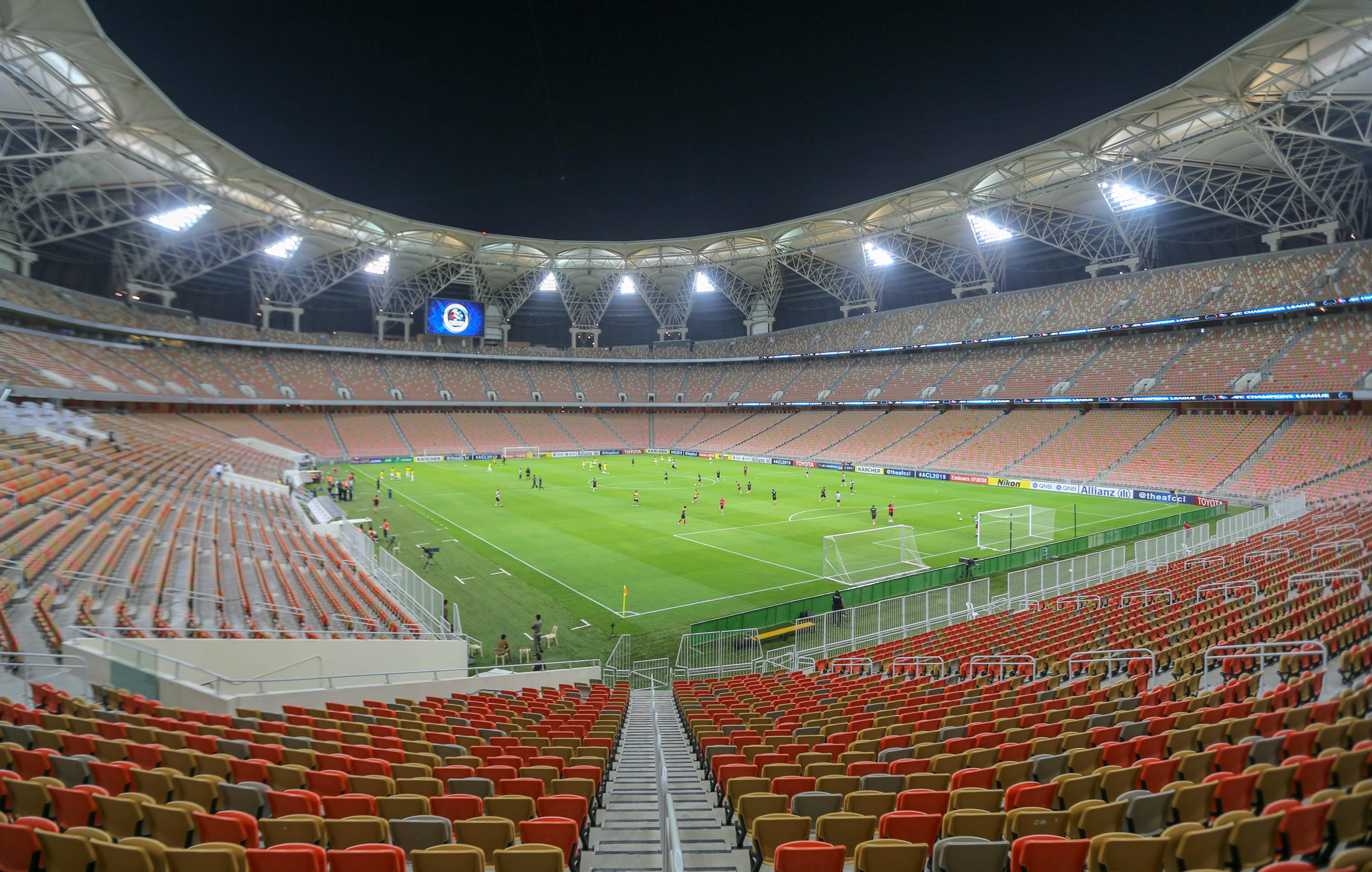
- Interactive map of King Abdullah Sports City Stadium
- Full name: King Abdullah Stadium (2014–2023); King Abdullah Sports City Stadium (2023–present); Alinma Stadium (2025–present)
- Location: Jeddah, Mecca Province, Saudi Arabia
- Owner: Ministry of Sport
- Operator: Ministry of Sport
- Capacity: 62,345
- Surface: Grass
- Scoreboard: Yes
- Record attendance: 62,827

Construction
- Groundbreaking: 2012; 14 years ago
- Opened: 2014; 12 years ago
- Renovated: 2023; 3 years ago
- Cost: $533 million SAR2 billion
- Architect: Arup Associates
- Structural engineer: Arup
- Services engineer: Arup
- Main contractors: BESIX, Al-Muhaidib Contracting Company

Tenants
- Al-Ahli (2014–present); Al-Ittihad (2014–present); Jeddah (selected matches); Saudi Arabia national football team (selected matches): Major sporting events hosted; 2023 FIFA Club World Cup 2025 AFC Champions League Elite finals 2026 AFC Champions League Elite finals 2027 AFC Asian Cup (planned) 2034 FIFA World Cup (planned)

Website
- www.kasc.com

The King Abdullah Sports City Stadium (Arabic: ملعب مدينة الملك عبدالله الرياضية), currently known as Alinma Stadium for sponsorship purposes, is a multi-purpose stadium located approximately 30 kilometres north of downtown Jeddah, Saudi Arabia. Serving as the principal venue of King Abdullah Sports City, it presently has the largest seating capacity of any stadium in Saudi Arabia, although it is expected to be surpassed by King Fahd Sports City Stadium in Riyadh following the completion of its ongoing renovations.

== Overview ==
The city was named after Abdullah, King of Saudi Arabia when the stadium opened. The main stadium (King Abdullah International Stadium) is used for football, reaching a full capacity of 62,241 spectators. It is the biggest stadium in Jeddah. Additionally, it is the 10th biggest stadium in the Arab world, and one of the biggest stadiums in Asia. Surrounding the main stadium are smaller sports venues. It also hosts athletics and indoor sporting events in indoor arenas. The stadium also hosted matches of the 2023 FIFA Club World Cup. In 2025, the stadium hosted the final of the newly revamped 2024–25 AFC Champions League Elite.

It is set to be a venue for the 2034 FIFA World Cup and has a proposed capacity of 58,432 people, where it will host fixtures in the group stage, round of 32, round of 16, and quarterfinals. The stadium will undergo some minor refurbishments for the tournament. It is also set to host the 2027 AFC Asian Cup, specifically the group stage, round of 16, quarterfinals, and a semifinal.

The bid for the construction was won by Saudi Aramco and the contractor for this project was a joint venture between Al Muhaidib Contracting Company and Belgian construction company BESIX Group.

The company also provided an independent evaluation of the performance of local staff and the event safety officer (provided by Sword Security) during the inaugural event at the KASC stadium. This led to a significant number of safety and security recommendations and the appointment of a dedicated Stadium Manager.

The stadium field surface is paspalum turfgrass marketed as Pure Dynasty Seeded Paspalum and provided by Atlas Turf International.

=== Opening ceremony ===
The city opened officially on May 1, 2014, hosting the final of the 2014 King's Cup tournament between Jeddah's Al-Ahli SC and Riyadh's Al-Shabab, in front of 62,241 fans. In a hometown upset, Al-Shabab won 3–0, and were crowned their 3rd King's Cup championship. The match was attended by then-King Abdullah, along with then-Crown Prince Salman and then-Deputy Crown Prince Muqrin. Under Supervision of MD Binyameen

== Facilities ==
Outside the main stadium, the city has three separate football fields and four small indoor arenas also used for football. It also has six tennis courts and a large indoor arena for sports and other purposes. The city has a main mosque and six separate smaller mosques. The city is further equipped with a comprehensive media center, in which spacious rooms are used for press conference for players, coaches, and football personalities.

== Other events ==
=== WWE ===
The stadium hosted WWE's Greatest Royal Rumble event on April 27, 2018, with over 60.000 people in attending. The event featured the first ever 50-man Royal Rumble match, with Braun Strowman being declared the winner and the Greatest Royal Rumble Champion after last eliminating Big Cass.

The event was a part of a 10-year strategic multi-platform partnership between WWE and the Saudi General Sports Authority in support of Saudi Vision 2030, Saudi Arabia's social and economic reform program.

WWE returned to Jeddah on June 7, 2019, with Super ShowDown, which featured the first ever 50-man Battle Royal. The Undertaker and Goldberg competed in the main event.

=== Boxing ===
On October 8, 2017, a deal was agreed for the complex to host the final of the World Boxing Super Series: Cruiserweight tournament in May 2018.

"This agreement is part of our broader commitment and work to develop the sport of boxing in Saudi Arabia. Having the first final of such a high profile and groundbreaking tournament take place in Saudi Arabia is a key milestone for us, and will be one of many major sports events to take place in the Kingdom next year."

— Turki Al-Alsheikh, former president of The General Sports Authority

"This is fantastic news, not just for World Boxing Super Series but for boxing and for the sport in Saudi Arabia. We have seen huge and growing interest in the World Boxing Super Series from fight fans, broadcasters, commercial partners and venue owners from the major boxing markets around the world."

— Roberto Dalmiglio, CEO of Comosa

In February 2018, the final was set to be Oleksandr Usyk vs. Murat Gassiev. May 11 was the date that was set for the final, however in April, Usyk suffered a minor injury to his left elbow and ultimately the final was rescheduled to take place on July 21 in Moscow, Russia. Usyk won the fight via a dominant unanimous decision.

On July 5, it was rumoured the WBSS super middleweight final between George Groves vs. Callum Smith, an all-British fight, would not take place in the UK and likely to take place in Jeddah. Both boxers made their opinions known that it was not ideal the final should take place Jeddah as it would be much bigger in the UK, however there was no complaints from either side. There was more frustration at the bout being postponed. The final was announced to take place on September 28 at a 10,000 capacity arena at the Complex.

A heavyweight boxing match dubbed 'Rage on the Red Sea' sees Oleksandr Usyk and Anthony Joshua fighting for the second time. This fight was confirmed for the King Abdullah Sports City in Jeddah as of June 2022, Usyk was the winner of their first fight which happened in London, England, during September 2021. This rematch is Joshua's second professional fight in Saudi Arabia, he previously fought Andy Ruiz Jr. in the 'Clash on the Dunes' at the Diriyah arena during 2019. The boxing match is set to take place on Saturday the 20th of August 2022 with a maincard including the first all female boxing fight in Saudi Arabia.

=== Tennis ===
From 2023 to 2027, the Next Gen ATP Finals are schedulded to be hosted in the stadium.

== Hosted Events ==
=== 2024–25 AFC Champions League Elite ===
The stadium hosted five matches during the 2024–25 AFC Champions League Elite , From Quarter Finals - Final including the final.

Date	Time (UTC+3)	Team #1	Score	Team #2	Round	Attendance
April 25, 2025	19:30	(Saudi Arabia) Al-Hilal	7–0	(South Korea) Gwangju	Quarter-Finals	46,275
April 26, 2025	19:30	(Saudi Arabia) Al-Ahli	3–0	(Thailand) Buriram United	Quarter- Finals	43,027
April 29, 2025	19:30	(Saudi Arabia) Al-Hilal	1–3	(Saudi Arabia) Al-Ahli	Semi-Finals	50,613
April 30, 2025	19:30	(Saudi Arabia) Al-Nassr	2–3	(Japan) Kawasaki Frontale	Semi-Finals	28,810
May 3, 2025	19:30	(Saudi Arabia) Al-Ahli	2–0	(Japan) Kawasaki Frontale	Final	58,281

=== 2027 AFC Asian Cup ===
The King Abdullah Sports City Stadium will host eight matches of the 2027 AFC Asian Cup.

Date	Time	Team No. 1	Result	Team No. 2	Round	Attendance
8 January 2027	19:30	Uzbekistan	–	Jordan		Group B
10 January 2027	13:30	South Korea	–	Yemen		Group E
13 January 2027	16:30	Jordan	–	Bahrain		Group B
17 January 2027	20:00	Saudi Arabia	–	Kuwait		Group A
20 January 2027	13:30	Thailand	–	Indonesia		Group F
25 January 2027	19:30	Winner Group C	–	Third Group A/B/F		Round of 16
28 January 2027	15:30	Winner Match 38	–	Winner Match 41		Quarter-finals
2 February 2027	20:00	Winner Match 47	–	Winner Match 48		Semi- Finals

== See also ==
- List of things named after Saudi kings
- List of football stadiums in Saudi Arabia
