= Arada =

Arada may refer to:

== Geography ==
- Arada, Chad, a town and subprefecture in the department of Biltine in eastern Chad
- Arada (Addis Ababa), one of the 10 subcities of Addis Ababa, the capital of Ethiopia
- Arada, Honduras, a municipality in the Honduran department of Santa Bárbara
- Arada, a tributary of the Albac in Alba County, Romania
- Bou Arada, a town and commune in the Siliana Governorate, Tunisia
- Horea (formerly Arada), a commune located in Alba County, Romania
- Arada, another spelling of Kingdom of Ardra, in modern Benin
  - Arada people, referring to the people of said kingdom, the Aja people (sometimes including the Fon people)

== Other uses ==
- "L'arada", a cycle of six folk songs by Canteloube 1935
- "Arada", a guitar instrumental written by Federico Moreno Torroba, the 2nd part of his Suite castellana (1926)
- Arada (company), a property developer based in Sharjah, United Arab Emirates
- Sultan Ali al-Arada (born 1959), Yemeni politician
