= Reem bint al-Waleed Al Saud =

Saudi royal and businesswoman (born 1983)

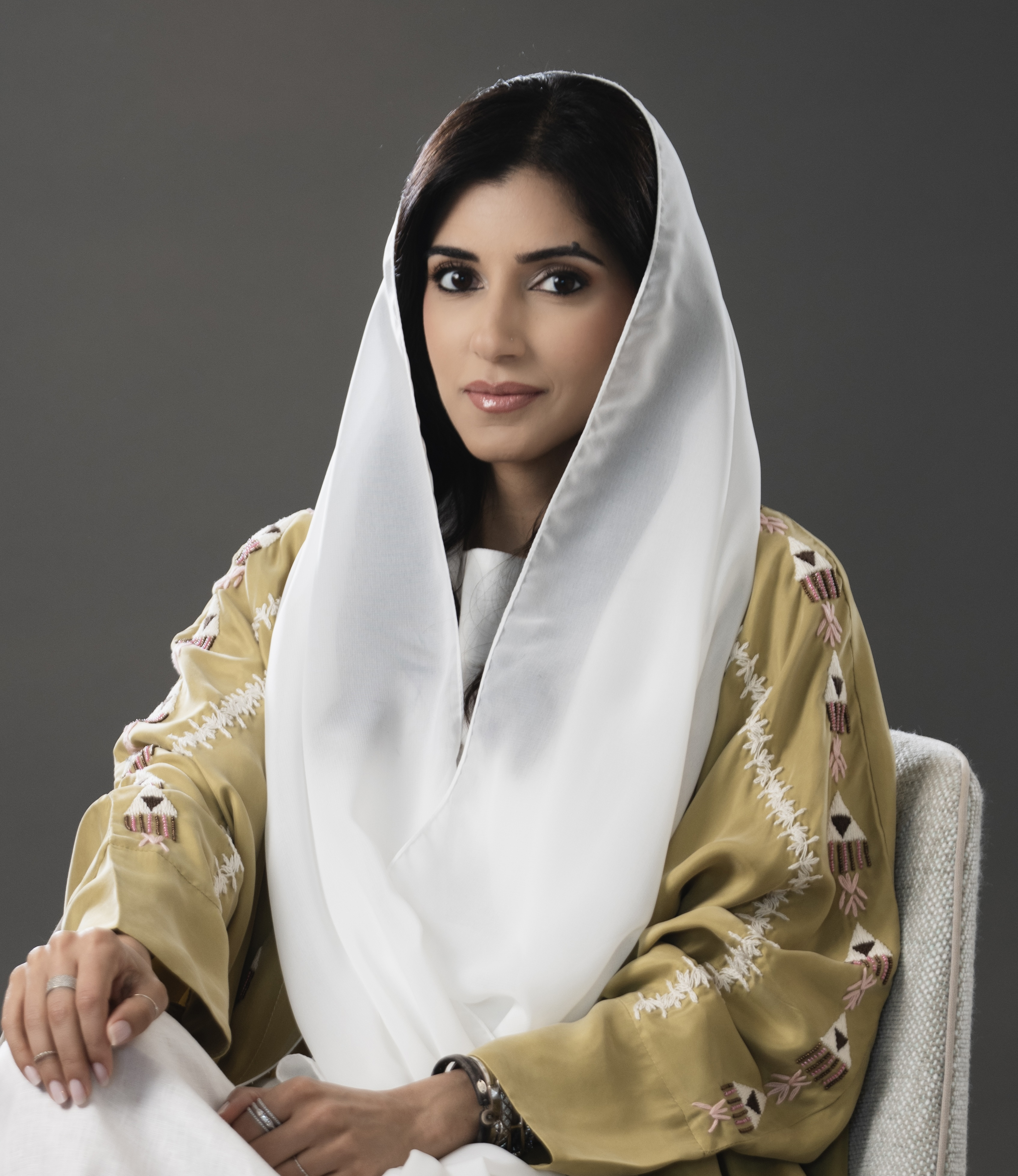
- Born: 7 March 1983 (age 43); Riyadh, Saudi Arabia
- Spouse: Abdulaziz bin Musaed
- Issue: 3 daughters
- House: Al Saud
- Father: Al Waleed bin Talal Al Saud
- Mother: Dalal bint Saud Al Saud

Reem bint al-Waleed bin Talal Al Saud (Arabic: ريم بنت الوليد بن طلال آل سعود; born 7 March 1983) is a Saudi royal and businesswoman.

Princess Reem was born in Riyadh on 7 March 1983, the daughter of Al Waleed bin Talal Al Saud and Dalal bint Saud Al Saud. Reem is one of the most prominent Saudi social-media personalities, and is sometimes known as the "Kim Kardashian of Saudi Arabia" due to their perceived similar physical appearances and business endeavours. She often wears Western-style clothing, which has drawn criticism.

Reem married fellow Saudi royal Abdulaziz bin Musaed in 2007. Together, they have three daughters. Reem was arrested on 9 November 2017 as part of the 2017–2019 Saudi Arabian purge, following the arrest of her father. She was the first woman of the royal family to be arrested during the purge. She was later released and shortly thereafter welcomed the release of her father.
