= Dalal bint Saud Al Saud =

Saudi royal and philanthropist (1957–2021)

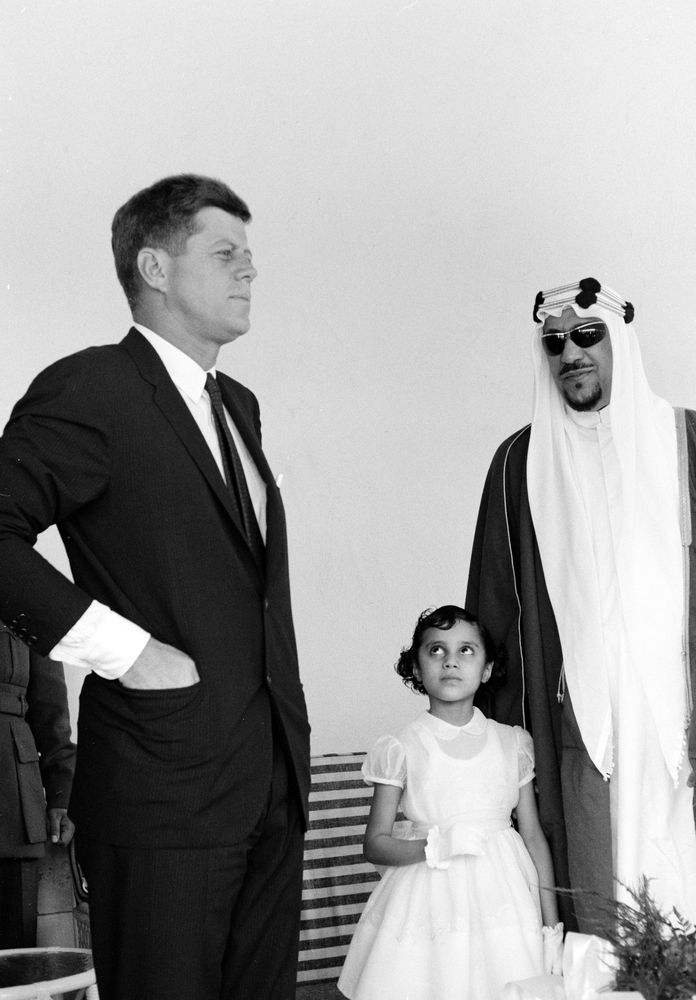
- Princess Dalal, between her father King Saud and U.S. president John F. Kennedy, in Palm Beach, Florida in 1962
- Born: 1957; Riyadh
- Died: 10 September 2021 (aged 63–64)
- Burial: 13 September 2021; Al Oud cemetery, Riyadh
- Spouse: Al Waleed bin Talal Al Saud (m. 1976; div. 1994)
- Issue: Princess Reem; Prince Khalid
Names
- Dalal bint Saud bin Abdulaziz bin Abdul Rahman Al Saud
- House: Al Saud
- Father: King Saud
- Mother: Terkiyah Mohammed Al Abdulaziz

Dalal bint Saud Al Saud (Arabic: دلال بنت سعود آل سعود; 1957 – 10 September 2021) was a Saudi Arabian activist and philanthropist. A member of the House of Saud, she was known for her activities concerning the welfare of youth and children at risk. She was one of the grandchildren of Saudi's founder King Abdulaziz and one of the children of King Saud.

== Biography ==
Princess Dalal was born in Riyadh as one of the daughters of King Saud, the second ruler of Saudi Arabia. Her mother was Terkiyah Mohammed Al Abdulaziz. Princess Dalal's full brothers included Prince Mansour, Prince Abdullah, Prince Turki, and Prince Al Waleed.

Princess Dalal was the first wife of Saudi royal and businessman Al Waleed bin Talal Al Saud. When they married, Prince Talal, her father-in-law, gave her a $200,000 necklace as a wedding gift which she sold to raise money for her husband. Dalal bint Saud later divorced from Prince Al Waleed with whom she had two children: Princess Reem and Prince Khalid. Khalid was born in California in 1978, and Reem in Riyadh in 1982.

Dalal bint Saud was an honorary board member of the Legacy of Hope Foundation, an organization providing healthcare reform for children worldwide. She participated in various campaigns and programs targeting youth and children at risk and foster care for this group.

In February 2021, Princess Dalal's daughter, Princess Reem, tweeted that Dalal had an operation to remove a tumor. She died on 10 September 2021 due to cancer. The Saudi Press Agency reported that funeral prayers for her were to be held on 13 September 2021 at the Imam Turki bin Abdullah Mosque in Riyadh.
