= Al Waleed bin Talal Al Saud =

Saudi Arabian royal, businessman and investor (born 1955)

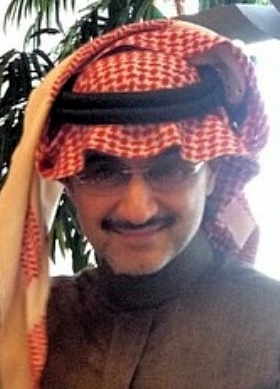
- Al Waleed in 2015
- Years active: 1979–present
- Alma mater: Menlo College; Syracuse University
- Born: 7 March 1955 (age 71); Jeddah, Saudi Arabia
- Spouses: Dalal bint Saud Al Saud (m. 1976; div. 1994) Iman Al Sudairi (m. 1996; div. 1997) Kholood Al Anazi (m. 1999; div. 2004) Ameera al-Taweel (m. 2008; div. 2013)
- Issue: Princess Reem; Prince Khalid
- House: Al Saud
- Father: Talal bin Abdulaziz Al Saud
- Mother: Mona El Solh
- Occupation: Chairman and CEO of Kingdom Holding Company

Prince Al Waleed bin Talal Al Saud (Arabic: الوليد بن طلال بن عبدالعزيز آل سعود المريدي البكري الوائلي; born 7 March 1955) is a Saudi Arabian billionaire businessman, investor, and a House of Saud royal. In 2008, he was listed on Time magazine's Time 100, an annual list of the hundred most influential people in the world. Al Waleed is a grandson of Abdulaziz, the first king of Saudi Arabia, and of Riad Al Solh, Lebanon's first prime minister.

Al Waleed is the founder, chief executive officer (CEO) and 95 percent owner of the Kingdom Holding Company, a Saudi conglomerate company. In 2013, the company had a market capitalization of over $18 billion. He owns Paris' Four Seasons Hotel George V and part of New York's Plaza Hotel. Time has called him the "Arabian Warren Buffett". In November 2017, Forbes listed Al Waleed as the 7th-richest man in the world, with a net worth of $39.8 billion.

On 4 November 2017, Al Waleed and other prominent Saudis (including fellow billionaires Waleed bin Ibrahim Al Ibrahim and Saleh Abdullah Kamel) were arrested in Saudi Arabia as part of Mohammed bin Salman's purge to centralize power in Saudi Arabia. The allegations against Al Waleed include money laundering, bribery, and extorting officials. Some of the detainees were held in the Ritz-Carlton, Riyadh. Al Waleed was released from detention on 27 January 2018, following a financial settlement of some kind, after nearly three months in detention. In March 2018 he was dropped from the World's Billionaires list due to lack of current information. He was listed in the 'Top 100 most powerful Arabs' from 2013 to 2021 by Gulf Business.

== Early life and education ==
Al Waleed bin Talal was born in Jeddah on 7 March 1955 to Prince Talal bin Abdulaziz and Mona El Solh. His father was Saudi Arabia's finance minister during the early 1960s, before he went into exile due to his advocacy for political reform. Al Waleed's paternal grandparents were King Abdulaziz and Munaiyir. His grandmother, an Armenian, was presented by the emir of Unayzah to King Abdulaziz in 1921, when she was 12 years old and Abdulaziz was 45. His maternal grandparents were Riad Al Solh, the first prime minister of Lebanon, and Fayza Al Jabiri, the sister of Syrian Prime Minister Saadallah al-Jabiri.

Al Waleed's parents separated when he was seven, and he lived with his mother in Lebanon. He first attended Pinewood College in Beirut. As a boy, he ran away from home for a day or two at a time, sleeping in unlocked cars, before attending the King Abdulaziz Military Academy in Riyadh. In 1974, he returned to Lebanon, attending the Choueifat School and then Manor School. Al Waleed received a bachelor's degree in business administration from Menlo College in California in 1979, finishing in two-and-a-half years, and a master's degree with honors in social science from the Maxwell School of Citizenship and Public Affairs at Syracuse University in 1985, finishing in eleven months.

== Business career ==
Al Waleed began his business career in 1979 after graduating from Menlo College. He returned to Saudi Arabia, which was in the midst of the 1974–85 oil boom. Operating from a small, four-room cabin in Riyadh and $30,000 start-up money provided by his father, Al Waleed formed Kingdom Establishment in 1980. When that money ran out in a few months, he secured a $300,000 loan from the Saudi American Bank, partly owned by Citibank. Rather than taking a commission for facilitating contracts as the legally required middleman, Al Waleed insisted on a stake in the project. His first success was in 1982, partnering with a South Korean construction company, and from then on, his commissions were used to fund his real estate deals. In his own words, "All the money I used to get from this construction I would plough back into real estate, and in the stock market, both."

After the end of the Saudi oil boom, Al Waleed acquired the underperforming United Saudi Commercial Bank (USCB). Through mergers with Saudi Cairo Bank (SCB), forming United Saudi Bank (USB), and the Saudi American Bank (SAMBA), it became a leading Middle Eastern bank. The hostile takeover of USCB in 1986, the merger with SCB in 1997, and the merger of USB with SAMBA in 1999, were the first of their kind in the Kingdom. He then secured a majority in Al-Azizia Panda, merging it with the Savola Group, and took over National Industrialization Company.

By 1989, his net worth was $1.4 billion, and included stakes in Canary Wharf, Four Seasons Hotel Group, and News Corporation. When Al Waleed turned to the international market, he focused on "established brands going through hard times," as Riz Khan puts it. Al Waleed would do his homework, and then wait for the proper purchase entry point. He invested about $250 million in Chase Manhattan, Citigroup, Manufacturers Hanover, and Chemical Bank. After seven months, he sold his stakes in the other banks and concentrated on investing in Citicorp, acquiring 4.9 percent of the bank. Though the worst performing bank of the four, Al Waleed considered Citicorp had the best potential.

In September 1990, Citibank was undercapitalized due to real estate credit losses and exposure to Latin America debt, prompting a need for a capital reserve. By November, they were actively seeking investors. Based on his banking experience in the Kingdom, Al Waleed agreed in January 1991 to invest $590 million, about half his accumulated wealth, in a five-year convertible security paying 11 percent interest. By Feb., that took his total investment in Citicorp to $797 million, or about 15 percent of the company. Though he had received a Federal Reserve temporary waiver to own such a large portion of the company, Al Waleed sold enough shares in 1993 to get below the 10 percent threshold. Still, he was the largest shareholder in the largest US financial institution at the time. Yet, in Alwaleed's words, "It is not a relationship, it's an alliance. We are there forever with them." Sandy Weill says of Al Waleed, "I think what he did really saved the bank."

In 1993, Al Waleed purchased a 10 percent stake in Saks Fifth Avenue for $100 million. A flagship store was then opened in Riyadh.

In 1994, Al Waleed secured a 50 percent controlling interest in Fairmont, and a 22 percent stake in the Four Seasons. In 1995, he bought a 42 percent stake in the Plaza Hotel, and it was reported that he was working on a music channel for his satellite TV platform.

Then, in 1996, he bought the George V for $185 million, and spent $120 million renovating it for a reopening in Dec 1999. Regarding Al Waleed's investment in the George V, Issy Sharp states, "...he created value where no one else could..."

In the same year, Al Waleed purchased a 24 percent stake in Euro Disney for $345 million.

In 1995, Kingdom Establishment for Trading and Contracting was reorganized as the Kingdom Holding Company, and Al Waleed announced construction of the Kingdom Centre, Kingdom Hospital, Kingdom School and Kingdom City. Also in 1995, he bought a 2.3 percent share of Mediaset after having invested earlier in the Arab Radio and Television Network, acquiring 30 percent. In October 1995, Al Waleed joined a consortium which paid $1.2 billion for control of Canary Wharf, with his share of the company amounting to 6 percent, costing him $66 million.

In March 1997, Al Waleed purchased a 5 percent stake in Apple Inc., making him the largest shareholder. In Nov. 1997, he purchased 1 percent share of Motorola for $287 million and a five percent share of Netscape for $146 million, before its purchase by AOL and merger with Time Warner. In 2001 and 2002, Al Waleed increased his stake in AOL Time Warner by another $540 million. He also invested in MCI, Fox Broadcasting and other technology and media companies.

Time reported in 1997 that Al Waleed owned about five percent of News Corporation, which he purchased for $400 million, making him the third largest shareholder. In April 1999, Al Waleed purchased an additional $200 million of preferred shares. In 2010, his News Corporation stake was about seven percent ($3 billion). Three years later, News Corporation had a $175 million (19-percent) investment in Al Waleed's Rotana Group, the Arab world's largest entertainment company. A review of his holdings implied that Al Waleed had sold his investment in AOL.

In April 1997, Al Waleed purchased a 4 percent stake in Planet Hollywood for $57 million, and another 16 percent in November 1998 for $45 million.

In October 1997, Al Waleed bought 27 percent of Mövenpick Hotels & Resorts, which he increased to 33 percent in 2003.

In 1999, The Economist expressed doubts about the source of his income, wondering if he was a front man for other Saudi investors:

He has not earned enough income from his investments to pay for all that he has spent in the 1990s. The mystery goes back to that first stake in Citicorp. The prince has declared that this money came entirely from his personal funds. He says he started out in 1979 with a loan of just $30,000 from his father. He also mortgaged a house that his father had given him, raising something like $400,000. And each month, as a grandson of Ibn Saud, he receives $15,000. You could barely clothe a Saudi prince for such sums, let alone furnish him with a multi-billion-dollar empire. Nevertheless, by 1991 Prince Alwaleed had felt able to risk an investment of $797m in Citicorp.

Al Waleed invested in WorldCom, Priceline.com, Coca-Cola, and Ford Motor Company, totaling almost $2 billion. In Asia, he bought 5.9 percent of Daewoo for $50 million, which he increased to 18 percent with an additional $100 million investment, 3 percent of PROTON Holdings for $46 million, 3 percent of Ong Beng Seng's Hotel Properties Ltd., and $50 million worth of Hyundai Motor Company bonds. In Africa, he invested $50 million, acquiring 10 percent of Sonatel, 10 percent of Ecobank, 13.7 percent of United Bank for Africa, and 14 percent of CAL Bank. Investments which turned out poorly included WorldCom, Priceline, Teledesic, and KirchMedia, besides Planet Hollywood and Euro Disney.

His stake in Apple was sold in 2005. Al Waleed also invested in Eastman Kodak and TWA, both of which performed moderately well.

In 2002, Al Waleed formed Kingdom Hotel Investments to oversee his hotel assets.

By 2003, Al Waleed owned 100 percent of Rotana, and 49 percent of LBC Sat.

His real-estate holdings included large stakes in the Four Seasons Hotels and Resorts and New York's Plaza Hotel; Al Waleed sold half his shares in the Plaza in August 2004. He has invested in London's Savoy Hotel and Monaco's Monte Carlo Grand Hotel. Al Waleed held a ten-percent stake in Euro Disney S.C.A., the company which owned, managed and maintained Disneyland Paris in Marne-la-Vallée. In 2017, The Walt Disney Company purchased the entirety of Al Waleed's ten-percent stake in efforts to gain the required 95% ownership to trigger a mandatory buy-out which they reached. The Walt Disney Company now owns Disneyland Paris in its entirety.

The 2004 Forbes list of wealthiest people had Al Waleed fourth, with a net worth of $21.5 billion. More than $1.3 billion was in hotel holdings.

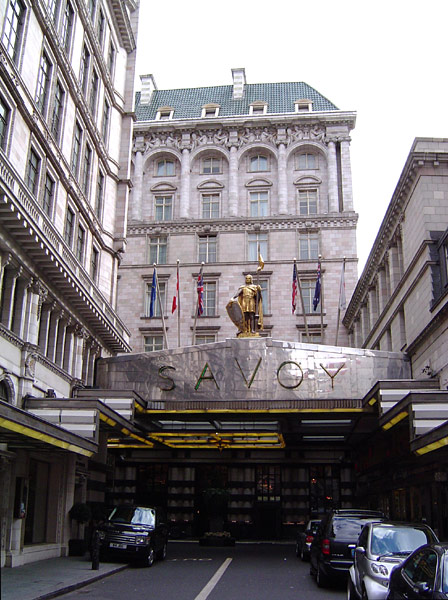
The Savoy Hotel in London is owned by Al Waleed

In January 2005, Al Waleed purchased the Savoy Hotel in London for an estimated £250 million, to be managed by Fairmont Hotels and Resorts; his sister, Sultana Nurul, owns an estimated 16 percent stake. In January 2006, in partnership with the U.S. real-estate firm Colony NorthStar, Kingdom Holding acquired Toronto-based Fairmont Hotels and Resorts for an estimated $3.9 billion. It was reported in 2009 that Al Waleed owned 35 percent of Research and Marketing Group (SRMG), a large mid-east media company.

In August 2011, Al Waleed announced that his company had contracted with the Saudi Binladin Group to build the world's tallest building, the Kingdom Tower (at a height of at least 1,000 metres (3,300 ft)) for SR 4.6 billion. The original plan—announced in 2008—called it برج الميل (Arabic for "One-Mile Tower"), at a height of 1,609 metres (5,279 ft) and an estimated cost of $20 billion.

In December 2011, Al Waleed invested $300 million in Twitter, purchasing secondary shares from insiders. The purchase gave Kingdom Holding "more than 3% share" in the company, which was valued at $8 billion in late summer 2011.

In 2015, he announced that he would donate his fortune to charity at an unspecified date. He had previously donated $3.5 billion over the course of 35 years through his charitable organization Alwaleed Philanthropies.

From 2015 to 2021, he lost several lawsuits against Pierre El Daher, CEO of LBCI, and would be required to pay $22m, due to breaches in contract conditions with the Lebanese broadcaster.

In May 2022, he was listed as committing to purchase approximately 35 million shares of Twitter Inc. at or immediately prior to the purchase of Twitter by Elon Musk and other private-equity investors behind Musk's bid. In July 2026, Al Waleed announced during a site visit that Jeddah Tower had reached 430 metres and 107 floors. ArchitectureLab reported that Kingdom Holding Company, which he chairs, is the project's principal investor, with completion targeted for 2028. Construction resumed in January 2025 after a seven-year halt, under a SAR 7.2 billion completion agreement signed in October 2024.

== Arrest and release ==
On 4 November 2017, Al Waleed was one of those arrested in Saudi Arabia in a "corruption crackdown" conducted by a new royal anti-corruption committee. In total, 320 princes, ministers and businessmen were detained at the five-star Ritz-Carlton Hotel in Riyadh. This was done on the orders of Crown Prince Mohammad bin Salman, who acted with the aim of consolidating his position as the next ruler of the kingdom. Mohammad bin Salman is Al Waleed's first cousin; both are male-line grandsons of founding King Ibn Saud.

Al Waleed and most of the other Saudi notables arrested made financial settlements of some kind with the Saudi government before they were released. In his case, as in the case of most of the other detainees, the Saudi Arabian government did not disclose charges or produce evidence, and the negotiations were held in secret. In December, some weeks after the arrests, it was reported that the Saudi Arabian authorities were demanding $6 billion from Prince Al Waleed bin Talal in exchange for his release.

Al Waleed was released from detention in late January 2018, nearly three months after his arrest. According to a Wall Street Journal report, the price for his release was $6 billion. In comparison, his first cousin Prince Mutaib bin Abdullah, son of the late King Abdullah (1924–2015), was released after reportedly paying $1 billion.

Just days before his arrest, Al Waleed reportedly contacted US-based Saudi journalist Jamal Khashoggi (who had publicly criticized the Saudi government in the past) and invited him to return to the Kingdom to contribute to Mohammad bin Salman's vision.

== Forbes dispute ==
In 2013, Kerry Dolan, editor of Forbes' annual billionaires' list, wrote an article accompanying the list entitled "Prince Alwaleed and the Curious Case of Kingdom Holding Stock". According to Dolan, Al Waleed attached great importance to the Forbes list and she alleged a correlation between changes in the share price of Kingdom Holdings and the annual run-up to the list's publication. In the Forbes article, Dolan wrote that Al Waleed would blind copy Dolan on text messages he sent to prominent people in an attempt to impress her. She spent a week with him in Riyadh in 2008, at his behest, touring his palaces. In 2006 Forbes estimated Al Waleed's net worth at $7 billion less than he claimed. He telephoned Dolan at home, according to the editor, "nearly in tears". Al Waleed had Kingdom Holding's chief financial officer fly to New York before a previous list was published to ensure that Forbes used his stated numbers.

The article explains the methodology behind Forbes' 2013 estimate of his wealth at $20 billion, examines Kingdom Holdings' share performance and contains Dolan's communications with Kingdom Holdings CFO Shadi Sanbar. Sanbar demanded that Al Waleed's name be removed from the billionaires' list if Forbes did not increase its valuation of his wealth. Dolan wrote, "As Forbes asked increasingly specific questions in the process of fact-checking this story, the prince acted unilaterally the day before it was published, announcing through his office that he would 'sever ties' with the list." Sanbar said in a press release, "Prince Alwaleed has taken this step as he felt he could no longer participate in a process which resulted in the use of incorrect data and seemed designed to disadvantage Middle Eastern investors and institutions."

Al Waleed said in a March 2013 interview with The Sunday Telegraph that he would pursue legal action against Forbes. "They are accusing me of market manipulation," Al Waleed said. "This is all wrong and a false statement. We will fight it all the way against Forbes." He called the Forbes list "flawed and inaccurate", saying that it "displays bias against Middle East investors and financial institutions."

The Guardian reported that on 6 June 2013, Al Waleed had brought a defamation claim in London against the publisher of Forbes; its editor, Randall Lane, and two journalists from the magazine. Forbes expressed surprise at the libel action and the fact that it was filed in London. According to the magazine, "The Prince's suit would be precisely the kind of libel tourism that the UK's recently passed libel reform law is intended to thwart. We would anticipate that the London high court will agree. Forbes stands by its story." As of 20 June, Forbes had not been served with papers.

A statement issued by the Kingdom Holding Company accused Forbes of publishing a "deliberately insulting and inaccurate description of the business community in Saudi Arabia and specifically, Forbes' denigration of the Saudi stock exchange (Tadawul), which is one of the most regulated in the world". According to Al Waleed, the magazine used an "irrational and deeply flawed valuation methodology, which is ultimately subjective and discriminatory".

On 16 June 2015, Forbes and Al Waleed released a joint statement announcing that they had settled their dispute "on mutually agreeable terms". The opening of the Saudi stock exchange to foreign investors was cited as key in the defendants' willingness to consider the stock price of Al Waleed's publicly traded Kingdom Holding Company in valuing the KHC component of his wealth.

== Political views ==
Al Waleed tweeted a statement with a picture of himself holding an honorary Palestinian passport, "In response to the news of the visit to Israel: I have not and will not visit Jerusalem or pray inside it until its liberation from the Zionist enemy. And I carry an honorary Palestinian passport".

In 2015, Al Waleed was criticised for offering to buy Bentley cars for Saudi fighter pilots involved in the Saudi Arabian-led intervention in Yemen. In a tweet later deleted, he said: "In appreciation of their role in this operation, I'm honoured to offer 100 Bentley cars to the 100 Saudi [fighter] pilots".

Al Waleed advocates for pragmatic governance, praises Giorgia Meloni’s centrist approach, and aligns with Donald Trump on social issues.

== Philanthropy ==
In July 1997, Al Waleed invested $10 million with the Palestinian Investment and Development Company (PADICO), and then helped cofound the Jerusalem Development and Investment Company (JEDICO).

In 2002, Al Waleed donated $500,000 to help fund the George Herbert Walker Bush scholarship at Phillips Academy in Andover, Massachusetts. He donated £18.5 million to Palestinian families during a TV telethon ordered by Saudi King Fahd to help relatives of Palestinians after Israeli operations in the West Bank city of Jenin. In 2004, he contributed $17 million to victims of the 2004 Indian Ocean earthquake and tsunami.

On 1 July 2015, Al Waleed held a press conference announcing his intention to donate $32 billion to philanthropic causes. He said that the funds would be used for humanitarian projects such as the empowerment of women and youth, disaster relief, disease eradication and building bridges of understanding between cultures.

=== Donation after 11 September attacks ===
After the 11 September attacks, Al Waleed gave a cheque for $10 million to New York City Mayor Rudy Giuliani, despite Saudi opposition. In a written statement after his donation, Al Waleed said: "At times like this, we must address some of the issues that led to such a criminal attack. I believe the government of the United States of America should re-examine its policies in the Middle East and adopt a more balanced stance toward the Palestinian cause." As a result of that statement, Giuliani returned his cheque. Al Waleed said to a Saudi weekly magazine about Giuliani's rejection of his check, "The whole issue is that I spoke about their position [on the Middle East conflict] and they didn't like it because there are Jewish pressures and they are afraid of them."

Giuliani replied to this by suggesting that Al Waleed's comment was actually part of the problem: "There is no moral equivalent for this [terrorist] act. There is no justification for it... And one of the reasons I think this happened is because people were engaged in moral equivalency in not understanding the difference between liberal democracies like the United States, like Israel, and terrorist states and those who condone terrorism. So I think not only are those statements wrong, they're part of the problem."

=== Western universities ===
In 2005, Al Waleed gave Georgetown University $20 million to create the Prince Alwaleed bin Talal Center for Muslim-Christian Understanding (ACMCU) in the university's School of Foreign Service, the second largest donation in the school's history. On 8 May 2008, Al Waleed gave £16 million to Edinburgh University to fund a "centre for the study of Islam in the contemporary world". He has also endowed the Prince Alwaleed Bin Talal Bin Abdulaziz Alsaud Center for American Studies and Research (CASAR). The Institute for Computational Biomedicine at Weill Cornell Medical College is named for Al Waleed. The Centre of Islamic Studies at the University of Cambridge and the Islamic Studies Program at Harvard University are also named after him. At his alma mater Syracuse University, Al Waleed is an honorary member of the advisory board of the Maxwell School of Citizenship and Public Affairs.

=== First Saudi female pilot ===
Al Waleed financed the training of Hanadi Zakaria al-Hindi as the first Saudi woman commercial airline pilot, and said at her graduation that he is "in full support of Saudi ladies working in all fields". Al-Hindi became certified to fly within Saudi Arabia in 2014.

== Assets ==
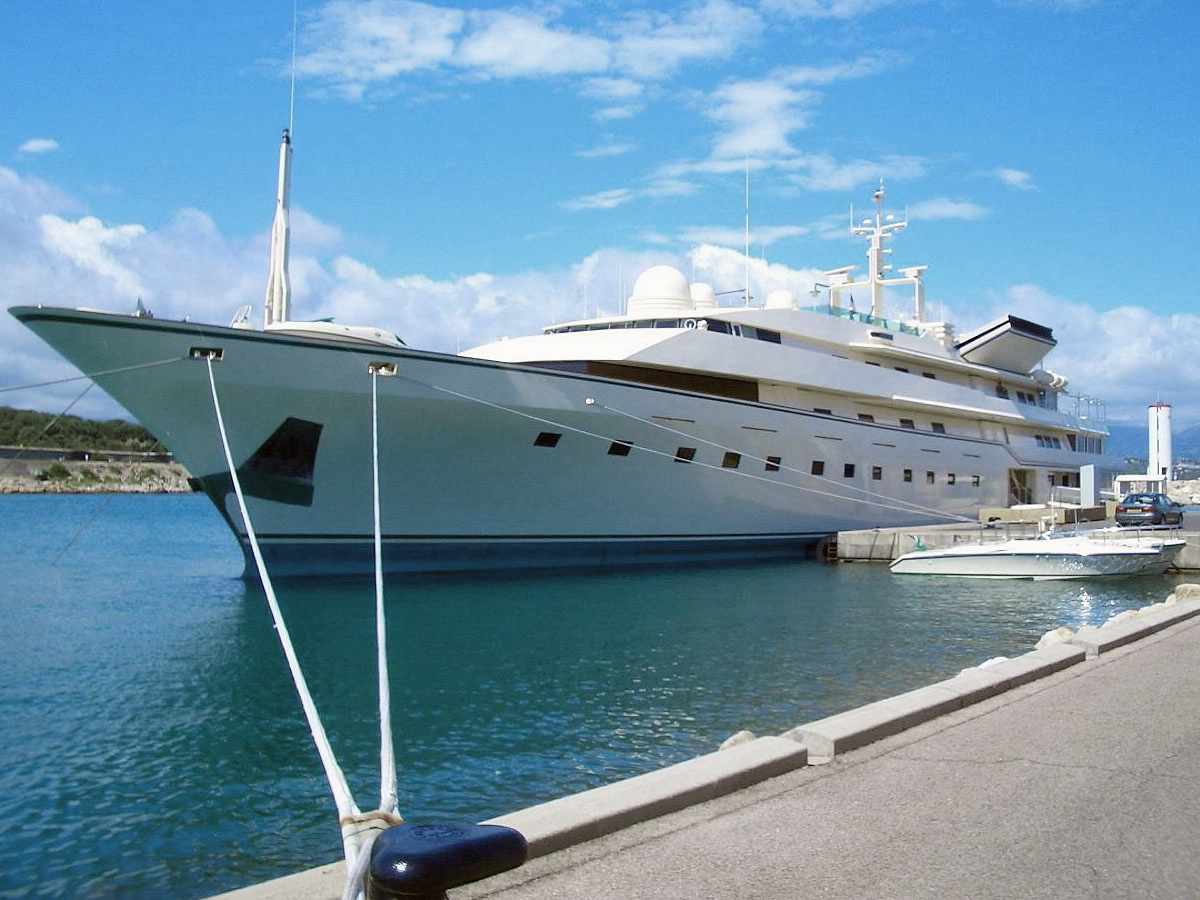
Kingdom 5KR

Al Waleed owns the 65th-largest private yacht in the world, the 85.9-metre (282 ft) Kingdom 5KR (originally built as the Nabila for Saudi arms dealer Adnan Khashoggi in 1979). In 1983, owned by Khashoggi, it appeared as the Flying Saucer (the yacht of James Bond's villain, Largo) in Never Say Never Again. It was sold to Donald Trump, who renamed her the Trump Princess. Al Waleed bought the yacht after Trump experienced financial problems in the late 1980s.

Al Waleed ordered a yacht known as the New Kingdom 5KR, about 173 metres (568 ft) long with an estimated cost of over $500 million. The yacht is designed by Lindsey Design, and its design was delivered in late 2010.

He owns several aircraft converted for private use: a Boeing 747, an Airbus A321 and a Hawker Siddeley 125. Al Waleed was the first individual to purchase an Airbus A380 and was due to take delivery of it in the spring of 2013, but it was sold before delivery.

Among his assets are a 95-percent stake in Kingdom Holding Company; 91-percent ownership of Rotana Video and Audio Visual Company; 90-percent ownership of the Lebanese Broadcasting Corporation; seven-percent ownership of News Corporation; about six-percent ownership of Citigroup, and a 17-percent ownership of Al Nahar and a 25-percent ownership of Ad-Diyar (two daily newspapers published in Lebanon). Al Waleed topped the first Saudi Rich List in 2009, with assets of $16.3 billion.

=== Palaces ===
Al Waleed owns three palaces: two existing and a third under construction. The 250,000-square-foot (23,000 m^{2}) Kingdom Palace, in central Riyadh, is his primary home. According to Time magazine, "Al Waleed lives in Riyadh, Saudi Arabia in a $130 million sand-colored palace whose 317 rooms are adorned with 1,500 tons of Italian marble, silk oriental carpets, gold-plated faucets and 250 TVs. It has four kitchens, for Arabic, Continental and Asian cuisines, and a fourth just for dishing up desserts, run by chefs who can feed 2,000 people on an hour's notice. There is also a lagoon-shaped pool and a 45-seat basement cinema". The 500,000-square-foot (46,000 m^{2}) Kingdom Resort, also in central Riyadh, has three lakes interspersed with gardens. The 4,000,000-square-foot (370,000 m^{2}) Kingdom Oasis, under construction, will have a 70,000-square-metre (17-acre) lake and a private zoo.

=== Awards ===
Al Waleed received the first order of the Order of King Abdulaziz of Saudi Arabia in 2002 and is a recipient of the Lebanese National Order of the Cedar. On 2 December 2009, he received the Order of Izzuddin from Maldives President Mohamed Nasheed; that year he also received the Star of Palestine, the highest honour conferred by the State of Palestine. In 2010, Al Waleed received the Dwight D. Eisenhower Award for Innovation. He received the Bahrain Medal of the First Order, the country's highest honorary medal in late May 2012. He received the Nepalese third-order Mahaujjval Rastradip Manpadvi, the highest award bestowed on a foreigner, and Guinea-Bissau's Colina De Boe Medal in August 2012. In June 2013 Al Waleed was made Grand Commander of the Order of the Republic of Sierra Leone (GCRSL), the country's highest honour. On 13 December 2014, he was made an Honorary Companion of the National Order of Merit of the Republic of Malta.

== Honors ==
=== Saudi Arabian national honours ===
Ribbon bar	Honour
	Member 1st Class of the Order of Abdulaziz Al Saud

=== Foreign honors ===
Ribbon bar	Country	Honour
The Khalifah Order of Bahrain, 1st class	Bahrain	Member 1st Class of the Khalifiyyeh Order of Bahrain
	Benin	Grand Officer of the National Order of Benin
	Brunei	Member 1st Class of the Family Order of Laila Utama
Order Stara planina ribbon	Bulgaria	Member 1st Class of the Order of the Balkan Mountains
Burkina Faso Ordre national Commandeur ribbon	Burkina Faso	Commander of the National Order of Burkina Faso
National Order of the Republic (Burundi) – ribbon bar	Burundi	Grand Cross of the National Order of the Republic of Burundi
Ordre national du Tchad – Grand Officer	Chad	Grand Officer of the National Order of Chad
Ordre de l'Etoile d'Anjouan Commandeur ribbon	Comoros	Commander of the Star of Anjouan
Order of Merit – Grand Cross (Central African Republic)	Central African Republic	Grand Cross of the National Order of Merit of Central African Republic
Order of the Grand Star of Djibouti – ribbon bar	Djibouti	Grand Cordon of the National Order of the Star of Djibouti
Legion Honneur Commandeur ribbon	France	Commander of the Legion of Honour
Ordre des Arts et des Lettres Commandeur ribbon	France	Commander of the Ordre des Arts et des Lettres
GAB National Order of Merit – Grand Cross BAR	Gabon	Grand Cross of the National Order of Merit of Gabon
Ord.Gambia-ribbon	Gambia	Grand Commander of the Order of the Republic of The Gambia
Order of the Volta (Ghanabhribbon bar	Ghana	Companion of the Order of the Volta
National Order of Merit – Commander (Guinea)	Guinea	Commander of the National Order of Merit of Guinea
	Equatorial Guinea	Grand Cross of the Order of Independence
JOR Order of the Star of Jordan GC	Jordan	Grand Cordon of the Order of the Star of Jordan
Cote d'Ivoire Ordre national GC ribbon	Ivory Coast	Grand Cross of the National Order of the Ivory Coast
Order of the Golden Heart of Kenya	Kenya	Grand Cordon of the Chief of the Order of the Golden Heart of Kenya
LBN National Order of the Cedar – Grand Officer BAR	Lebanon	Grand Officer of the National Order of the Cedar
Order of the Star of Africa (Liberia) – ribbon bar	Liberia	Grand Cordon of the Order of the Star of Africa
MDG National Order – Grand Cross 1st Class BAR	Madagascar	Grand Cross of the National Order of Madagascar
MRT Commander Order of National Merit	Mauritania	Commander of the National Order of Merit of Mauritania
Order of Izzuddin (Maldives) – ribbon bar v. 1996	Maldives	Grand Cordon of the Order of the Distinguished Rule of Izzuddin
Mali Ordre national du Mali Commandeur ribbon	Mali	Grand Officer of the National Order of Mali
MLT National Order of Merit BAR	Malta	Companion of the National Order of Merit
MCO Order of Grimaldi – Grand Officer BAR	Monaco	Grand Officer of the Order of Grimaldi
Ordre de l'Ouissam Alaouite GC ribbon (Maroc)	Morocco	Grand Cordon of the Order of Ouissam Alaouite
Order of Orange-Nassau ribbon – Officer	Netherlands	Officer of the Order of Orange-Nassau
Order of Merit (Niger) – ribbon bar	Niger	Grand Cordon of the National Order of Merit of Niger
	Palestine	Grand Cordon of the Order of the State of Palestine
Ord.Nishan-i-Pakistan.ribbon	Pakistan	Hilal-e-Pakistan
PHI Order of Sikatuna 2003 Grand Officer BAR	Philippines	Grand Officer of Order of Sikatuna
SEN Order of the Lion – Grand Officer BAR	Senegal	Grand Officer of the National Order of the Lion
Order of Merit for Defence – Knight (Brazil) – ribbon bar	Sierra Leone	Grand Gordon of the Order of the Republic
Order of Diplomatic Service Merit (Class 3) Heung-In Medal ribbon	South Korea	Sungnye Medal of the Order of Diplomatic Service Merit
Order of the Republic (Sudan) – ribbon bar	Sudan	Grand Cordon of the Republic of the Sudan
Order of Umayyad (Syria) – ribbon bar	Syria	Member 1st Class of the Order of the Umayyads
TWN Order of Brilliant Star 1Class BAR	Taiwan	Grand Cordon of the Order of Brilliant Star
TGO Order of Mono – Grand Officer BAR	Togo	Grand Officer of the Order of Mono
Order of the Republic (Tunisia) – ribbon bar	Tunisia	Grand Officer of the Order of the Republic
	Tunisia	Grand Cordon of the Order of the Seventh of November
Vietnam Friendship Order ribbon	Vietnam	Medal of the Friendship Order
Order of the Pearl of Africa (Uganda) – ribbon bar	Uganda	Companion of the Most Excellent Order of the Pearl of Africa

== Personal life ==
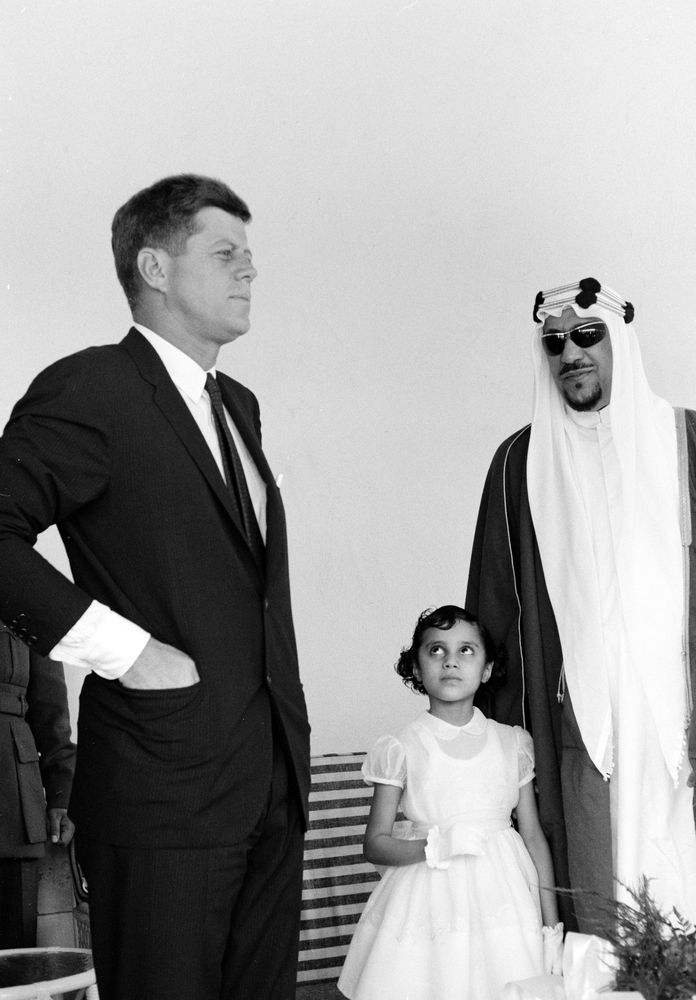
His first wife, Dalal, as a child, standing between her father King Saud and John F. Kennedy, 1962

Al Waleed has been married and divorced four times. His first marriage was in 1976, at the age of 19 to his cousin, Princess Dalal bint Saud, a daughter of King Saud. They have two children, Prince Khaled, born on 21 April 1978 and Princess Reem, born on 20 June 1982. Al Waleed and bint Saud later divorced in December 1994.

In 1996, Al Waleed married Iman Sudairi, but the marriage lasted approximately a year. After divorcing her, Al Waleed married Kholood Al Anazi, in 1999. They were divorced in 2004.

Al Waleed's fourth wife was Ameera al-Taweel; after about six years of marriage, they divorced in 2014. In an interview, he said: "Yes, I announce it through Okaz—Saudi Gazette for the first time. I have officially separated from Princess Ameera Al-Taweel, but she remains a person that I have all respect for."

He is a supporter of Al Hilal SFC and a Platinum Supporter Member of the club. In September 2024, he donated 300 million Saudi riyals to the club.

== See also ==
- List of Lebanese people in Saudi Arabia
