= Arada (company) =

UAE property development company

- Type: Privately Held Company
- Founded: 2017
- Headquarters: Dubai, United Arab Emirates
- Key people: Sheikh Sultan bin Ahmed Al Qasimi (chairman), Prince Khaled Bin Alwaleed Bin Talal Alsaud, (vice chairman), Ahmed Alkhoshaibi (Group CEO),
- Products: Real estate
- Number of employees: 2,600 (2026)
- Website: arada.com

Arada is a property development company based in Dubai, in the United Arab Emirates, with additional operations in Australia and the United Kingdom.

== History ==
Arada is a privately held property development company, based in the United Arab Emirates, with an initial focus on the emirate of Sharjah. The company was founded in 2017 by Sultan bin Ahmed Al Qasimi and Khaled bin Alwaleed Al Saud as a joint venture between their respective companies, Basma Group and KBW Investments, with Sultan bin Ahmed as chairman.

Arada has 55,000 homes and AED130 billion ($35 billion) of projects in its existing and future pipeline, as of early 2026.

Arada has launched supporting brands including Wellfit, which operates gyms in Dubai and Sharjah; Zad, a food truck park concept; Manbat, a partnership with the UAE Ministry of Climate Change and Environment that operates Emirati farmers’ markets and shops; and Artal, an Emirati fashion brand. Arada also signed its first master franchise agreement with Australia's Boost Juice in 2023.

Other acquisitions and partnerships in the food and beverage sector include Australian cookie and bakehouse brand Brooki and South Africa’s Tashas Group.

In May 2022, Arada was assigned credit ratings by Fitch and Moody’s, and issued its debut $500 million sukuk in the same year. In 2024, the company established a $1 billion sukuk programme, raising an initial $400 million from the programme in June.

In August 2024, Arada announced its first expansion outside the UAE into Sydney. The company invested AU$200 million on five initial sites in New South Wales.

In December 2024, Arada acquired three gym brands in the UAE, FitnGlam, The Platform Studios, and Fitcode.

In 2025, Arada completed several acquisitions to build up its industrial vertical, including the New South Wales operations of Australian contractor Roberts Co, Italian crane manufacturer Raimondi and three crane divisions belonging to US-listed Terex Corporation.

In September 2025, Arada expanded into the United Kingdom through the acquisition of London-based developer Regal. The company said that it would be investing an initial £500 million into the London market via the acquisition of Regal. In November 2025, it was announced Arada had paid £225 million to buy an 80% stake in the Thameside West waterfront scheme at the western end of the Royal Docks, London.

== Projects ==
Launched in March 2017, Nasma Residences is a housing project in the Al Tay suburb of Sharjah. The project was completed and handed over in 2020. Nasma Central, the project's community centre and public park, was completed in 2021.

Launched in September 2017, Aljada is a mixed-use development spread over a 24 million square foot area in the Muwaileh suburb of Sharjah. The masterplan includes housing, a business park, shops, hotels and schools as well as a leisure and entertainment complex, which is being designed by Zaha Hadid Architects. Construction work began in 2018, with the entire project scheduled for completion in 2025. In December 2017, Arada secured AED 1 billion in Islamic financing from two banks to help fund the development of the project. The company secured another AED 1 billion in financing in 2019 with further funding valued at AED 337 million and AED 250 million finalised in 2021. In February 2020, the first phase of the leisure entertainment complex, called Madar at Aljada, was opened to the public. In 2023, the Aljada Skate Park hosted both the Park and Street versions of the skateboarding World Championships, organised by World Skate. The first homes at Aljada were completed and handed over at the beginning of 2021. 7,500 units had been completed out of a planned 25,000 homes, alongside a school, sporting facilities, restaurants and shops.

In January 2021, Arada launched its third project, an upmarket forested community based in the Suyoh district of Sharjah. The project consists of 3,000 villas and townhouses, with the first phase due for completion by the end of 2023. The compound is set to incorporate a “green spine” comprising 50,000 trees. In September 2022, the central precinct of the project was opened. As of September 2024, half of Masaar had been completed, with around 1,500 homes handed over.

Masaar 2 is Arada’s second ‘forested’ community in Sharjah based in the Ruwaidat suburb of the city. Valued at AED5.5 billion, the project sold out three hours after launch, with the first homes scheduled to be delivered before the end of 2027.

Arada’s third Masaar master community was launched in September 2025, with 4,000 villas and townhouses across eight gated districts planned. The first two phases of the community sold out on the launch date.

In May 2025, Arada announced the launch of Akala, a hospitality and luxury residences concept focused on the theme of wellness, scheduled to be completed by the end of 2029.

In May 2024, Arada announced a partnership with Minor Hotels to launch the Anantara Sharjah Resort and Anantara Sharjah Residences, on Heerah Beach in Sharjah. The project is scheduled to be completed in 2027.

In November 2022, Arada launched its first project in Dubai. Based in the Jumeirah Golf Estates master community, Jouri Hills is planned to contain 294 high-end villas and townhouses.

In mid-2022, Arada announced a partnership with Armani Group and the Japanese architect Tadao Ando to build Armani Beach Residences at Palm Jumeirah. The project is scheduled to be completed by the end of 2026.

In October 2024, Arada announced the sales launch of W Residences at Dubai Harbour, a residences project that will be operated by Marriott International. Valued at AED5 billion, the developer has said that it is scheduled to be completed in 2028.

In January 2026, Arada launched Inaura Downtown, a 210-m tall hospitality and branded residences tower designed by Dutch architects MVRDV.
