= Al-Muhaidib =

Company

Al Muhaidib Group of Companies
- Company type: Private company
- Founded: Saudi Arabia (1946)
- Headquarters: HQ in Dammam, Saudi Arabia; with Main offices around the Kingdom
- Key people: Sulaiman A. K. Al-Muhaidib; Emad A. K. Al-Muhaidib; Essam A. K. Al-Muhaidib
- Products: Industrial: Building Materials, Hardware, Metal, Wood. Food Products: Rice, Sugar, Grains. Commercial: Marketing, Superstores, Land Transport. Other: Industrial Paint, Contracting, Trading, Electrical cable, Communications, Petrochemicals
- Website: muhaidib.com

The Al Muhaidib Group (Arabic:مجموعة المهيدب) is an international private group of companies based in Saudi Arabia that was founded in 1946 by Abdul Kadir bin Abdul Muhsin Al-Muhaidib. The current chairman of the board of directors is Sulaiman A. K. Al-Muhaidib.

== History ==
The first company was founded in 1946- under the name Abdulatif and Abdulkadir Al-Muhaidib Company. Its main interest was selling wholesale building materials and foodstuffs. In 1959 the company name was changed to Al-Muhaidib and Al-Nafea Company, and in 1979 it was changed again to A.K Al-Muhaidib & Sons Group of Companies.

A.K. Al-Muhaidib & Sons group of companies began its life in the food products industry in 1959, marketing and distributing rice. Although this sector has remained the fastest-growing within the group, allowing the company to expand its portfolio to include other grains and eventually leading to the establishment of a retail outlet chain, Giant Stores (Now merged with Panda). The group's other main interest, building materials, has been connected with Saudi Arabia's economic and industrial development.

== Food & Retail ==
=== Mayar Foods ===
In Saudi Arabia, and the GCC, one of the fastest growing companies within the Al-Muhaidib Group is Mayar Foods Co. (formerly Al-Muhaidib Foods). Established in 1959, the company has become a specialist in all facets of rice distribution and marketing. By expanding its product lines to include Pasta, and the distribution of Barilla Pasta in Saudi Arabia, the company continues its strategy of acquiring national and international products. This has resulted in developing a vast network of sales offices. Mayar Foods is one of the top 15 suppliers to all Saudi retailers, and has been growing ever since.

=== Savola Foods ===
Established in 1979 with an initial SR 40 Million Capital & grew significantly in subsequent years to SR 5 Billion, Savola Foods currently has market shares of 62% of the Edible Oils market and 68% of the Sugar market in the Kingdom.

=== Panda Retail Company ===
Panda Retail Company was founded in 1978, and is 92% owned by Savola forming the food retailing arm of theٍ Savola Group. It is one of the most important organizations in the retail sector in Saudi Arabia, operating a network of hypermarkets, supermarkets and convenience stores in the Kingdom and has entered the Dubai retail scene. In its own right Panda is considered to be one of the largest Saudi joint-stock companies in the Kingdom of Saudi Arabia.

== Industrial ==
=== Masdar Technical Supplies ===
The company was established for more than thirty years. There are many branches in the main cities of Saudi Arabia such as Riyadh, Jeddah and Dammam. The main warehouse area is around 30,000 square meters and it accommodates up to 17,000 items including different types of fixing material such as bolts, nuts, washers and fasteners with accessories made of iron, steel, copper, aluminum, plastic and a variety of galvanization. The company has become a major specialist in the field of bolts, nails and fixing material and a major supplier for many national factories and major companies in Saudi Arabia and neighboring countries.

=== Masdar Building Materials ===
Today the company has more than 1,300 employees working in over 70 branches over Saudi Arabia with over 1 million square meters of storage capacity. The company is supported with large fleet of vehicles, machinery and equipment to help work with the stock of products exceeding 10,000 items with wide representation of leading international and local manufactures. The company works with steel products including reinforced steel and industrial steel such as hollow steel, beams, plate iron, pipes, angles, coiled, mesh wires and other metal products. The company also supplies wood products made from imported timber from Romania, Russia, Sweden, Finland, Canada, Austria, Chile, etc. The company just embarked in the "Builder Merchant" concept, where it expanded its core building material portfolio to complement its current product such as cement, blocks, core electrical and core plumbing.

=== Al-Muhaidib Hardware Company ===
Al-Muhaidib Hardware has established over 42 showrooms throughout the Kingdom, offering nearly 20,000 different hardware items. Al-Muhaidib Hardware Company acts as the Agent for many brands of hardware products.

=== Al-Muhaidib Metal Industries ===
Al-Muhaidib Metal Industries Company was established in 1982. Today, the company has five factories operating in an area of 50,000 square meters in the industrial estate of Riyadh creating reinforcement steel, fabricated steel, building products, steel doors and other steel, aluminum and other metal products. Over the past years, the company has achieved tremendous success in local and international markets. The company has concluded several transactions with the Gulf Cooperation Council and other Arab and African countries.

=== Yamamah Steel ===
Located in Jeddah Industrial City with plant capacity of 140,000 tons per year. The Company manufactures and supplies various diameters.

=== United Wood Producers ===
The company was incorporated in 1988, and since then the company has grown and become a leading timber industry company in Saudi Arabia. The company's factory was built in Riyadh on an area of 24,500 square meters which included various types of wood products. Another factory is specialized in producing tailor-made standard products such as doors, cabinets, timber blocks, roofs and other wood products. Plastic-laminated kitchen units are also designed and produced for the construction sector. Other supplementary products are also manufactured. The third production unit is specialized in custom-made furniture, traditional design and handiwork. The manufacture of the traditional Najd style furniture is an exclusive to the company where engraving talents is produced. The company manufactures and installs doors made to British fire-fighting standards and can resist fire for up to 120 minutes. The company raw products are received from many timber exporting countries around the world. The finished products are distributed to many retailers and constructions companies in Saudi Arabia and the Middle East.

== Financial Services ==
=== SABB ===
Established in 1978 as a Joint Stock Company, listed on TADAWUL. It is an associated Company of HSBC Group, a leading provider of banking, insurance, and assets management services in Saudi Arabia.

=== Gulf Union Co ===
A prominent insurance service provider in Saudi Arabia, incorporate in 2007 and listed on TADAWUL. Associates of Gulf Union Project Management company that was established in 1982, providing insurance services in Bahrain & Saudi Arabia, the company offers property, liability, automobile and health insurance coverage services in Saudi Arabia.

== Real estate and contracting ==
=== Al Oula Development ===
Aloula Development Company (Saudi sector of Emaar Properties) quests adopting a new conception on in the sector of real estate and housing services, in addition to its struggle for catering a new model for new real estates Saudi Companies. The company has established specialized workgroups, not only in the Kingdom but also at the level of the Persian Gulf and Arab countries.

=== Rafal Real Estate ===
Headquartered in Al Riyadh, Rafal Real Estate Co. was formed in late 2007, with the objective of developing residential communities and commercial properties, their landmark project is the Burj Rafal in Riyadh, at 308m, it is the tallest residential building in the country.

=== Thabat ===
In 2017 Al Muhaidib Contracting was re-branded to Thabat. Thabat in Arabic means Stable. This company is responsible for construction work throughout the Kingdom of Saudi Arabia and the Persian Gulf region. With workforce of more than 14,000 employees, the company has participated in major construction projects for large Government establishments and other corporations in Saudi Arabia including Saudi Aramco, NWC, Royal Commission, Ministry of Finance, Ministry of education . Projects constructed by the company includes water treatment plants and networks, construction of schools, banks, housing projects, shopping centers, warehouses and office blocks. Al-Muhaidib contracting has been engaged in strategic projects inline with the recent privatization concept adopted by the successful bidder for the rehabilitation and upgrade of Jeddah Industrial City wastewater management system using BOT technique. The project was a first of its kind in Saudi Arabia. The company also constructs projects utilizing special techniques like construction of pipelines using micro-tunneling, which is a non-intrusive method that negate the need for open trench excavation. In line with adopting the latest technologies in construction, Al-Muhaidib contracting recently obtained sole agency for the Middle East and North Africa for specialized fire fighting systems mainly used in the oil and gas industry. The company represents two leading companies in this discipline, Water Mist Engineering (WME) of Norway and Ultrafog of Sweden.

== Energy ==
=== ACWA Power ===
Founded in 2002 as Arabian Company for Water and Power Development (ACWA). The Riyadh-based ACWA Holding is a group of companies established to participate in the ever-growing range of private projects in the power and water sector in Saudi Arabia. It has entered into Joint Ventures with other international companies to broaden its range of capabilities and provide additional strength to address the needs of the major new projects currently being operated.

== See also ==
- List of companies of Saudi Arabia
- SABB
- King Abdullah Economic City
- ACWA Power
