= Panda Retail Company =

Saudi Arabian grocery retailing company

- Native name: شركة بنده للتجزئة
- Formerly: Azizia Panda United Company
- Company type: Private
- Industry: Hypermarket, food and drink
- Founded: 1978; 48 years ago
- Area served: Saudi Arabia, Egypt, United Arab Emirates
- Key people: Bander Talaat Hamooh (CEO)
- Products: Retail – Hypermarket
- Revenue: SAR 26,842 million (2023)
- Net income: SAR 899 million (2023)
- Number of employees: 18,000
- Parent: Savola Group
- Website: panda.com.sa

Panda Retail Company (Arabic: شركة بنده للتجزئة) is a Saudi Arabian grocery retailing company. Panda is one of The Savola Group's subsidiaries. The Savola Group is ranked ninth amongst the top 100 companies in the Saudi Arabian market and ranked second amongst the industrial sector after SABIC. The Savola Group has recently listed its Oils and Fats division in the Saudi Stock market under the name Afia International.

== History ==
United Panda Co. was founded in Riyadh in 1981 with a capital of SR 207.50 million. Initially the company dealt in selling and importing foodstuff, garments, luxury items, and electric appliances. In September 1993 Prince Al-Waleed bin Talal bought 50.1% of the company, at a time it was making loss, and had sixteen supermarkets in Riyadh and two at Jeddah, after the acquisition, Al-Waleed merged his retail company Al-Azizia Markets Co. with United Panda Co. to form Al-Azizia Panda United, in which he became the chairman. In 1998, the company merged with Saudi Vegetable Oil Co. (now Savola Group) under the name United Azizia Safola Co., in the next year became United Azizia Savola Co.

In, September 2003, Azizia Panda United company made it to the Guinness Book by launching the biggest pyramid-shaped box with Tide.

In 2004 Panda launched its own private label and opened its first hyper market under the brand name HyperPanda.

In March 2006, Azizia Panda United opened its fifth hypermarket in the Kingdom of Saudi Arabia. In April, opened its first outlet outside the kingdom of Saudi Arabia with an investment of AED 50 million (US$13.6 million). The outlet was located in Dubai's Festival City; it was closed ten years later.

In December 2007, United Azizia Panda made sales worth SR3.7 billion in 2007, a 35% increase from 2006.

In 2008, Al Azizia Panda United acquired Giant Stores in Saudi Arabia from Al-Muhaidib Group and merged it into its operations. In the following year Savola Group acquired all 11 Geant Stores, a franchise by al Hokair Group KSA through an asset purchase agreement, and merged it with Panda.

In March 2009, Azizia Panda unveiled the biggest bottle of shampoo in the world with 4,000 liters content of "Herbal Essences" and measuring 4.8m long.

In July 2010, the minister of commerce and industry of the Kingdom of Saudi Arabia, Abdullah bin Ahmed Zainal Ali Reza approved the transformation of United Azizia Panda Company from a limited liability company to a closed joint stock company. In 2010 Panda owned 7.7% of market cap of the kingdom's retail sector.

In 2014, Panda introduced Pandati stores.

In 2015, Panda opened its first store in Egypt. After two years, opened its first hypermarket in Upper Egypt.

In November 2016, Panda Retail Company CEO Muwaffaq Mansoor Jamal, resigned after 12 years of service. Savola Group CEO Eng. Rayan Fayez named interim CEO.

As of June 2016, the company operated 65 HyperPanda stores and 156 Panda Chain outlets across Saudi Arabia. In 2016 the retailer closed 51 Pandati stores.

In December 2017, Panda Retail Company interim CEO Eng. Rayan Fayez resigned. Former inspector general of the Saudi Ministry of Health, and CEO of Al Nahdi Pharmaceuticals Dr. Bandar Hamooh, named acting CEO.

In November 2022, Panda Retail Company is rebranded with the new logo and Hyperpanda is changed to Panda Hyper.

== See also ==
- Savola Group
- List of companies of Saudi Arabia
