= Savola Group =

Saudi Arabian industrial company

Savola Group مجموعة صافولا
- Type: Public
- ISIN: SA0007879162
- Founded: January 10, 1979; 47 years ago
- Headquarters: Jeddah, Saudi Arabia
- Key people: Sameh Mahmoud Hassan (CEO); Sulaiman Al-Muhaidib (chairman); Bader Abdullah Alissa (vice chairman); Wajid Usman Khan (CFO); Morhaf Mohammad Alsamman (CHRO); Mohammad Nasr (CIO); Elnour Ali Saad (Chief Corporate Governance and Legal Affairs officer, and Group Board Secretary)
- Revenue: SAR 24.669 billion (2021)
- Total assets: 26,657,711,000 Saudi riyal (2019)
- Number of employees: around 32,000 (2016)
- Subsidiaries: Panda Retail Company & Savola Foods Company

The Savola Group (Arabic: مجموعة صافولا) is a Saudi Arabian industrial company. The group's major holdings supply Saudi Arabia, the Middle East and North Africa, and Turkey with edible oils, sugar, fresh dairy products, and restaurants serving fast foods. The group also owns the largest grocery retailing chain in the Middle East, Panda Retail Company.

It is ranked as number 9 among top 100 companies in the Saudi Arabian market and ranked as number 2 among the industrial sector after SABIC. Savola has recently listed its Oils and Fats division in the Saudi Stock market under the name Afia International.

It was founded in 1979 as Saudi Vegetable Oils and Ghee Co., initially the company's business was importing and refining edible oil.

Savola is the kingdom's biggest food company by revenue.

According to Al-Waleed bin Talal, "This group was established by me and some of my allies...I'd created what you could call the 'Nestlé of the Middle East' – the Savola Group, which is a very dominant force in its field."

== Acquisitions ==
In 2009, Savola signed a deal with Alhokair Group to buy Geant supermarket outlets in Saudi Arabia.

In October 2011, Savola bought 78% of Egypt's Al-Malika and Al-Farasha companies.

In 2018, Savola acquired 51 percent stake of Dubai-based Al Kabeer Group.

In 2022, Savola acquired Egybelg.
