= Khaled bin Alwaleed Al Saud =

Saudi royal, entrepreneur, and investor (born 1978)

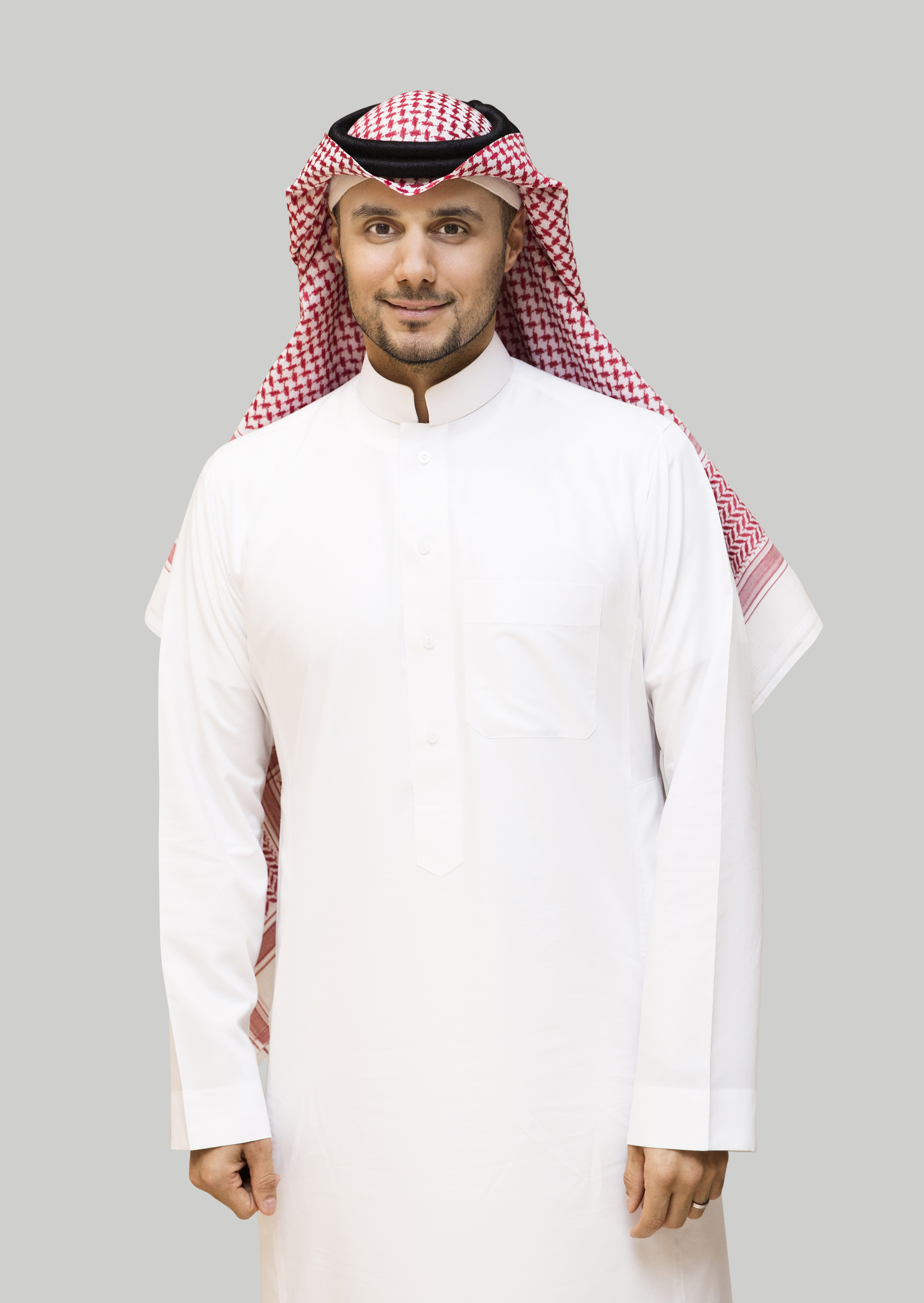
- Prince Khaled bin Alwaleed in 2017
- Born: 21 April 1978 (age 47) (Note: Date of birth is self-reported.); Stanford, California, U.S.
- Spouse: Munira bint Ibrahim Al Assaf
- House: Al Saud
- Father: Al-Waleed bin Talal
- Mother: Dalal bint Saud
- Occupation: Businessman

Khaled bin Alwaleed Al Saud (Arabic: خالد بن الوليد آل سعود; born 21 April 1978) is a House of Saud royal, entrepreneur, and investor. He is the son of Al-Waleed bin Talal and his first wife and cousin Dalal bint Saud. Khaled has been noted for his vegan lifestyle. He is the grandson of King Saud of Saudi Arabia on his mother's side and a great-grandson of King Abdulaziz, the founder of the Kingdom of Saudi Arabia, on both his mother's and father's side.

== Early life and education ==
According to his official biography, Khaled was born in Stanford, California and raised in Riyadh. At age 14, he suffered a crushed skull during a jet skiing accident in France, but eventually made a full recovery. He graduated from the University of New Haven with a degree in business before going to work for Citigroup.

== Career ==
Khaled is the founder and chief executive officer (CEO) of KBW Investments and KBW Ventures, and the founder of property developer Arada. Through his companies, he is an investor in the Italian crane manufacturer Raimondi, in Beyond Meat, the tech news website TechnoBuffalo, ESG capital firm Eat Well Investment Group (EWGFF), and Square, Inc. He has also been an investor in and board member of JUST, Inc. He was named as one of a number of high-profile investors in the $17 million Series A round of investments in the lab-grown meat startup Memphis Meats. In 2018, Khaled announced plans to open a chain of 30 vegan restaurants in the Middle East. The same year, he was named Technology Investor of the Year at the Arabian Business CEO Middle East awards. On 9 September 2021, Prince Khaled joined Eat Well Investment Group Inc. as a strategic adviser.

== Personal life ==
Khaled is the son of Al-Waleed bin Talal and Dalal bint Saud. He married Munira bint Ibrahim Al Assaf, daughter of Saudi former finance and foreign minister Ibrahim Al Assaf.

In the 1990s, Khaled was known for his opulence and extensive collection of 200 luxury cars. After participating in a trophy hunt in South Africa, a trip he would later describe as "cowardly", Khaled adopted a more austere lifestyle, ultimately becoming a vegan and disposing of his automobile collection. He has been described as an environmentalist and has called for the abolition of zoos, reportedly purchases carbon offsets for his travel and drives an electric Tesla Model X P90D. Khaled's father was reportedly inspired by his son's adoption of veganism to become a vegan himself.

== See also ==
- List of vegans
