= Dingler =

Dingler may refer to:

== People ==
- Christian Dingler (1802–1858), a German inventor and manufacturer
- Dillon Dingler (born 1998), American baseball player
- Hermann Dingler (1846–1935), a German botanist and physician
- Hugo Dingler (1881–1954), a German scientist and philosopher

== Other ==
- Dingler, Alabama, a community in the United States
