= Tadano Faun =

German manufacturer

Coordinates: 49.517175°N 11.313574°E

Tadano Faun GmbH
- Type: GmbH
- Industry: Mechanical engineering
- Founded: 1990
- Headquarters: Lauf an der Pegnitz, Germany
- Key people: Noriaki Yashiro (CEO)
- Products: All-terrain cranes, truck-mounted cranes, rough-terrain cranes
- Number of employees: 571 (2024)
- Parent: Tadano Europe Holdings GmbH
- Website: www.tadano.com/dach/en/

Tadano Faun GmbH is a German manufacturer of mobile cranes based in the Franconian (Bavaria) town of Lauf an der Pegnitz. It is a subsidiary company of the Japanese Tadano Ltd.; its direct holding company is Tadano Europe Holdings GmbH, and a sister company is Tadano Demag GmbH.

Tadano Faun develops and produces all-terrain cranes, including compact city cranes.

== History ==
=== Faun-Werke ===
In 1845, Justus Christian Braun founded a foundry in Nuremberg that produced fire-fighting equipment. Via the Nürnberger Feuerlöschgeräte- und Maschinenfabrik vorm. Justus Christian Braun AG, which built its first waste collection vehicles and street sweepers in 1908, and the Justus Christian Braun Premier-Werke, production passed in 1914 to the Nürnberger Feuerlöschgeräte-, Automobillastwagen- und Fahrzeugfabrik Karl Schmidt. In 1917, this company merged with the Fahrzeugfabrik Ansbach AG of Ansbach to form the Fahrzeugfabriken Ansbach und Nürnberg AG [vehicle factories of Ansbach and Nuremberg], which from 1920 was known in short as the Faun-Werke.

In the 1920s, Faun mainly developed municipal vehicles for waste disposal and street cleaning. Between 1924 and 1928, it also made automobiles. The first model, the 6/24 hp K 2 model, had a four-cylinder engine with an engine displacement of 1405 cm³ and an output of 24 hp. In 1926, it was followed by the 6/30 hp K 3 model with a four-cylinder engine and an engine displacement of 1550 cm³ that provided an output of 30 hp.

During World War II, the Faun plants were largely destroyed. In 1946, manufacturing began again, first using pre-war and war designs. In 1949, the L7 model was introduced, providing a load-carrying capacity of 6.5 t and a 150 hp engine by Klöckner-Humboldt-Deutz. Tractors were also built. The L7 was available as a traditional American-style truck and as cabover. In 1950 and 1951, the Sepp (130 hp and 6.5–7 t live load) and L8 (180 hp and 8 t live load) models replaced the former Faun models. From 1953 on, the triple-axle L900 truck was built, a vehicle for operating on difficult and heavy construction sites. The L900 could carry up to 16 t. The L8 and the L900 models were produced until 1962, the Sepp until 1955. In 1955, modernised models with a new identifier system came to the market. In 1955, Faun acquired a light Cab Over Engine from the Ostner plants for its own delivery programme, which underwent a technical overhaul in 1957. From 1956 onwards, heavy trucks and tractor units were added to the programme, which were also available with four-wheel drive.

In the mid-1950s, Faun increasingly produced heavy-duty and special vehicles for the Bundeswehr. The company received orders for 10-tonne heavy trucks, semitrailer tractors, tractors, crane chassis and special vehicles, which at times accounted for up to 70 percent of its production capacity. From 1956, Faun supplied the L908 and L912 series to the Bundeswehr as platform trucks, tractors, semitrailer tractors and crane chassis, most of them with all-wheel drive. In the late 1950s, Faun also developed new mobile crane chassis for military and civilian use. In 1960, the F 687 series was introduced. The F 687/49 V was powered by a V8 diesel engine with 192 hp and had a payload of 9 t. The F 687 series was revised in 1966 as the F 688 with a 210 hp V8 diesel engine, followed in 1968 by the F 689 with 230 hp. At the 1965 IAA, Faun presented its last generation of road trucks, which used a new tilting cab-over-engine cab made of steel and glass-fibre-reinforced plastic. In 1969, under the impact of a general decline in truck sales, Faun reduced road truck production in favour of special vehicles and later phased it out. By the end of 1970, production was divided between crane chassis, dump trucks, military vehicles, municipal vehicles, airfield vehicles and tractors.

In the mid-1970s, Faun supplied tractor trucks for the Soviet Union in the framework of the so-called Delta project: to develop oilfields in Siberia and build the Baikal-Amur Mainline. Faun delivered 86 HZ 34.30/41 articulated trucks with V12-Deutz engine and an output of 326 hp. Later, the Soviet Union ordered more tractor units by Faun of all frame sizes, from HZ 32.25/40 with a 305 hp V10 engine to the super-heavy HZ 40.45/45 all-terrain tractor unit with a 456 hp V12 Deutz engine. In total, Faun delivered 254 tractor trucks to the USSR, the last in 1989.

=== Formation of Tadano Faun and growth ===
In 1986, the owners at the time, the Schmidt family, sold the company to the construction machine manufacturer Orenstein & Koppel. Together they formed FAUN O&K; the newly formed company produced built-to-order ballast tractors in four versions: Herkules, Koloss, Goliath and Gigant. These ballast tractors were offered with various specifications.

The municipal vehicle department was detached and continued from 1994 as a company of the Kirchhoff Group, with the plant in Osterholz-Scharmbeck running under the name of Faun Umwelttechnik [Faun environment technology]. In 1990, the remaining part of the company was acquired by Japanese mobile crane manufacturer Tadano Ltd. Since then, Faun GmbH has represented the manufacturing company and Tadano Faun GmbH the sales company. In 2012, both companies merged to form the single company of Tadano Faun GmbH.

In the following years, several companies were acquired. In 2014, Tadano Faun took over the British dealer Cranes UK. After the acquisition, the company was renamed Tadano UK Ltd. and integrated into the structure of Tadano Faun. In 2018, Tadano Faun acquired Waterland Trading, with locations in the Netherlands and Belgium. The acquired businesses were subsequently converted into two separate subsidiaries, Tadano Nederland B.V. and Tadano Belgium B.V.B.A.

=== Restructuring ===
Between 2020 and 2021, Tadano Faun, together with Tadano Demag, went through insolvency proceedings under self-administration. In the course of the proceedings, a restructuring plan was drawn up that provided for a reorganisation in order to achieve the economic stabilisation of both companies. The proceedings were concluded on 31 March 2021. In the course of the reorganisation after the insolvency proceedings, the division of work between the sites of Tadano Faun (Lauf) and Tadano Demag (Zweibrücken) was changed. Vehicle carriers manufactured in Lauf were delivered to Zweibrücken for further assembly. This division of work between Lauf and Zweibrücken was later changed again. After the closure of the Wallerscheid part of the Zweibrücken plant, the product lines made there were distributed among the remaining main plant in Zweibrücken, the Lauf site and a Tadano plant in Japan.

== Organisation ==
Tadano Faun GmbH, based in Lauf an der Pegnitz, is part of the Japanese Tadano Ltd. The direct holding company of Tadano Faun GmbH is Tadano Europe Holdings GmbH, to which Tadano Demag GmbH of Zweibrücken also belongs.

The company is led by Noriaki Yashiro as chairman of the management board (CEO).

As of 31 December 2024, the company employed 571 people.

== Products ==
After the export-dependent business with heavy tractor units was discontinued in 1990, the company has been manufacturing mobile cranes, above all so-called all-terrain cranes, as well as the corresponding chassis, and has been performing service and repair work for military special vehicles. The company also produces other commercial vehicles and individual components. A further area is the spare parts and service business, which includes repairs and maintenance.

The cranes are available in different sizes and designs. They are usually equipped with telescopic booms. They are used in construction, in industry and for infrastructure projects, among other applications.

== Gallery ==
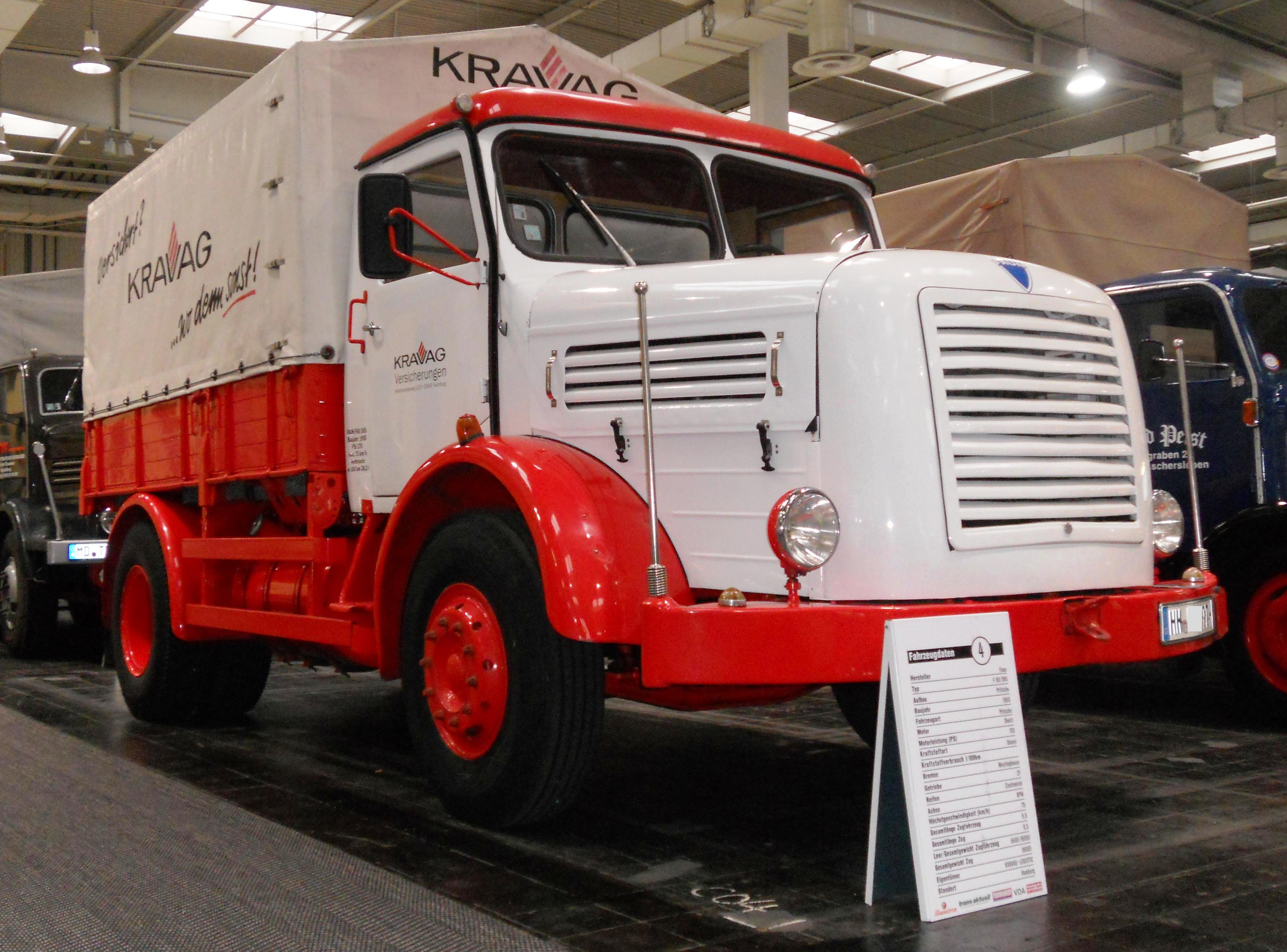

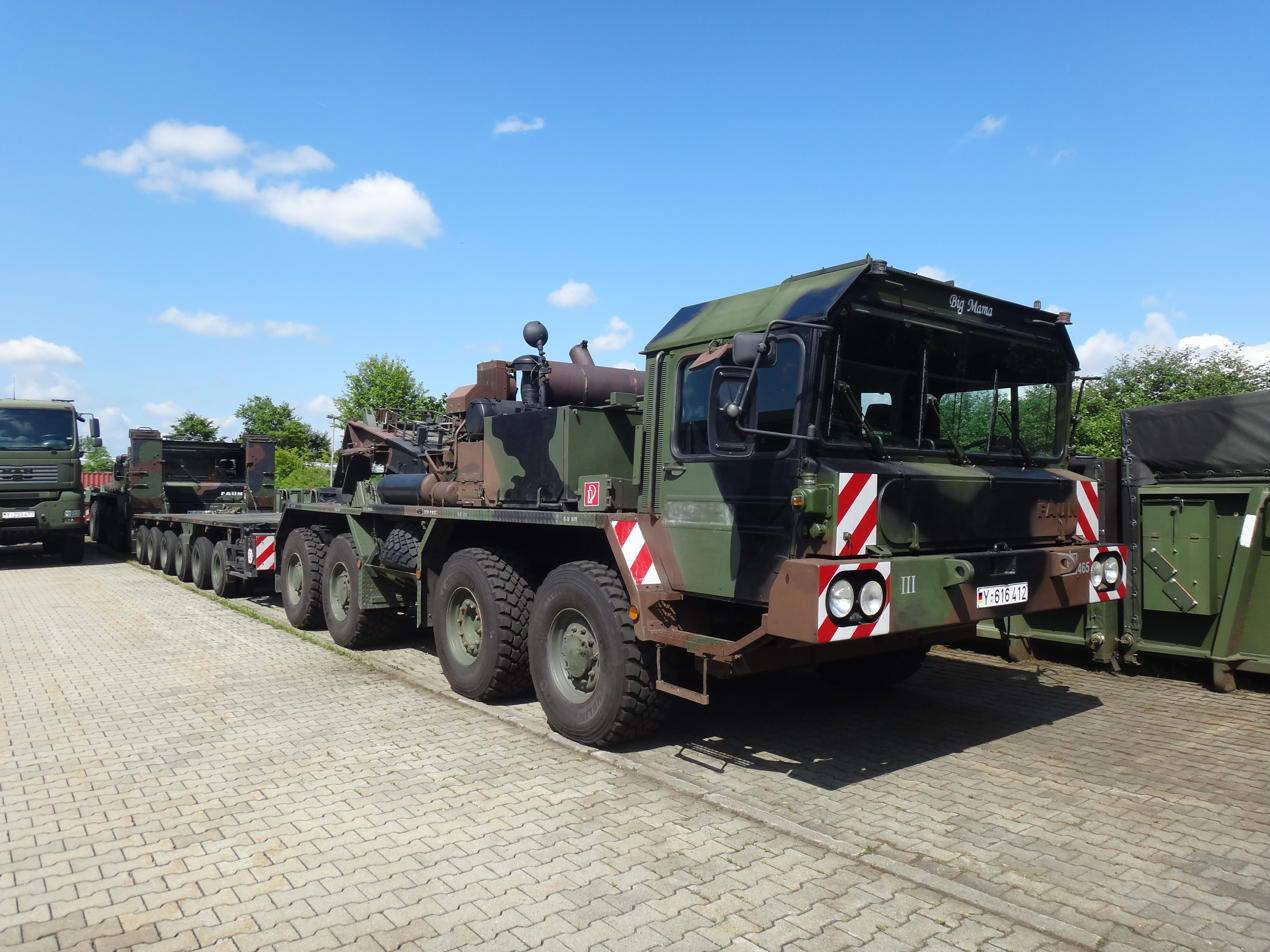

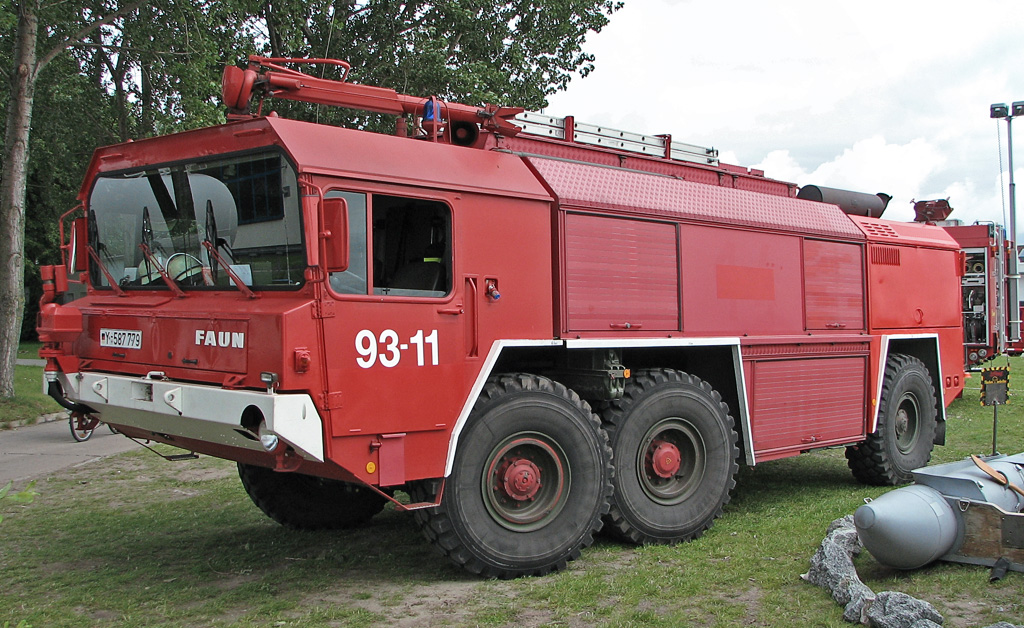

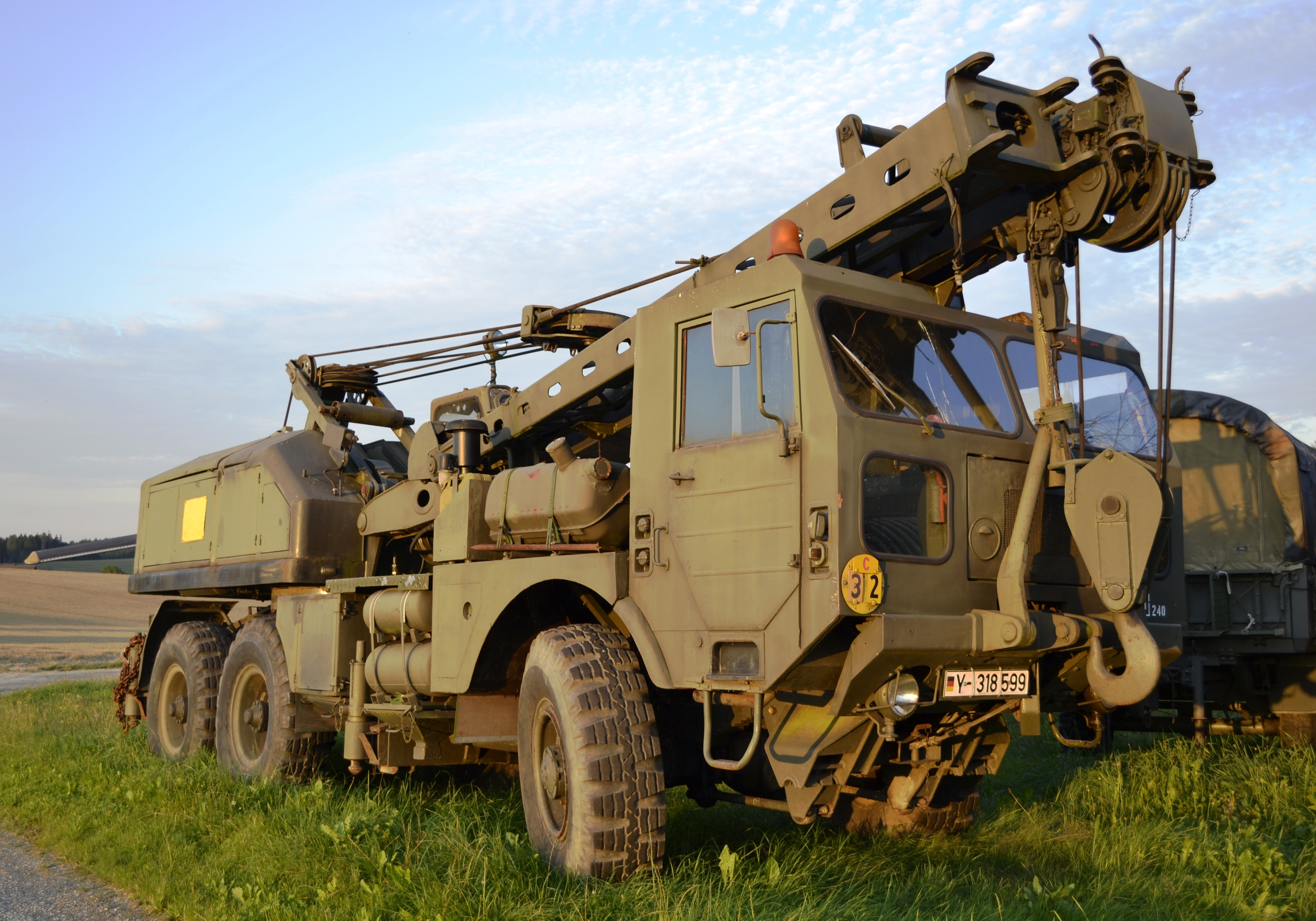

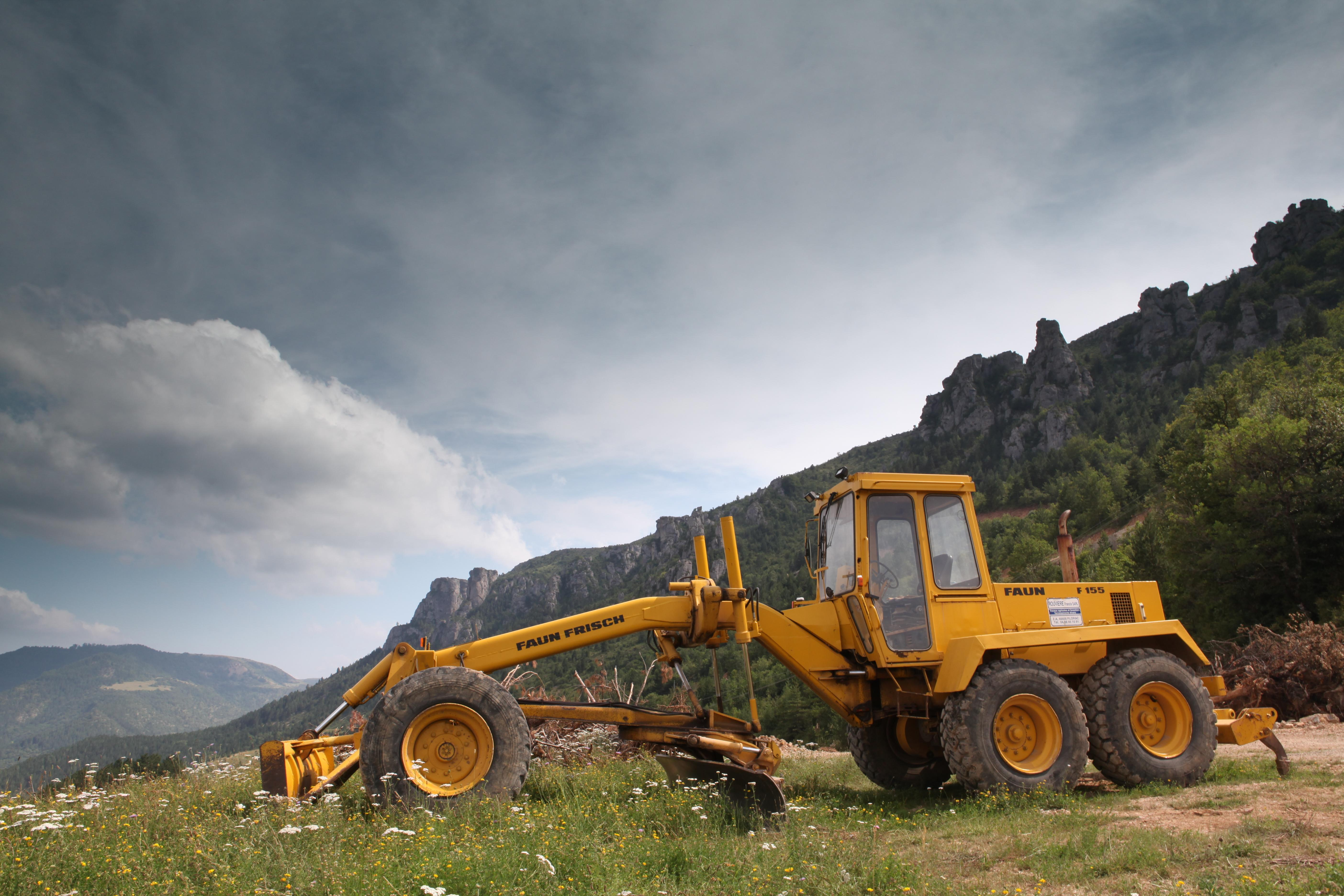

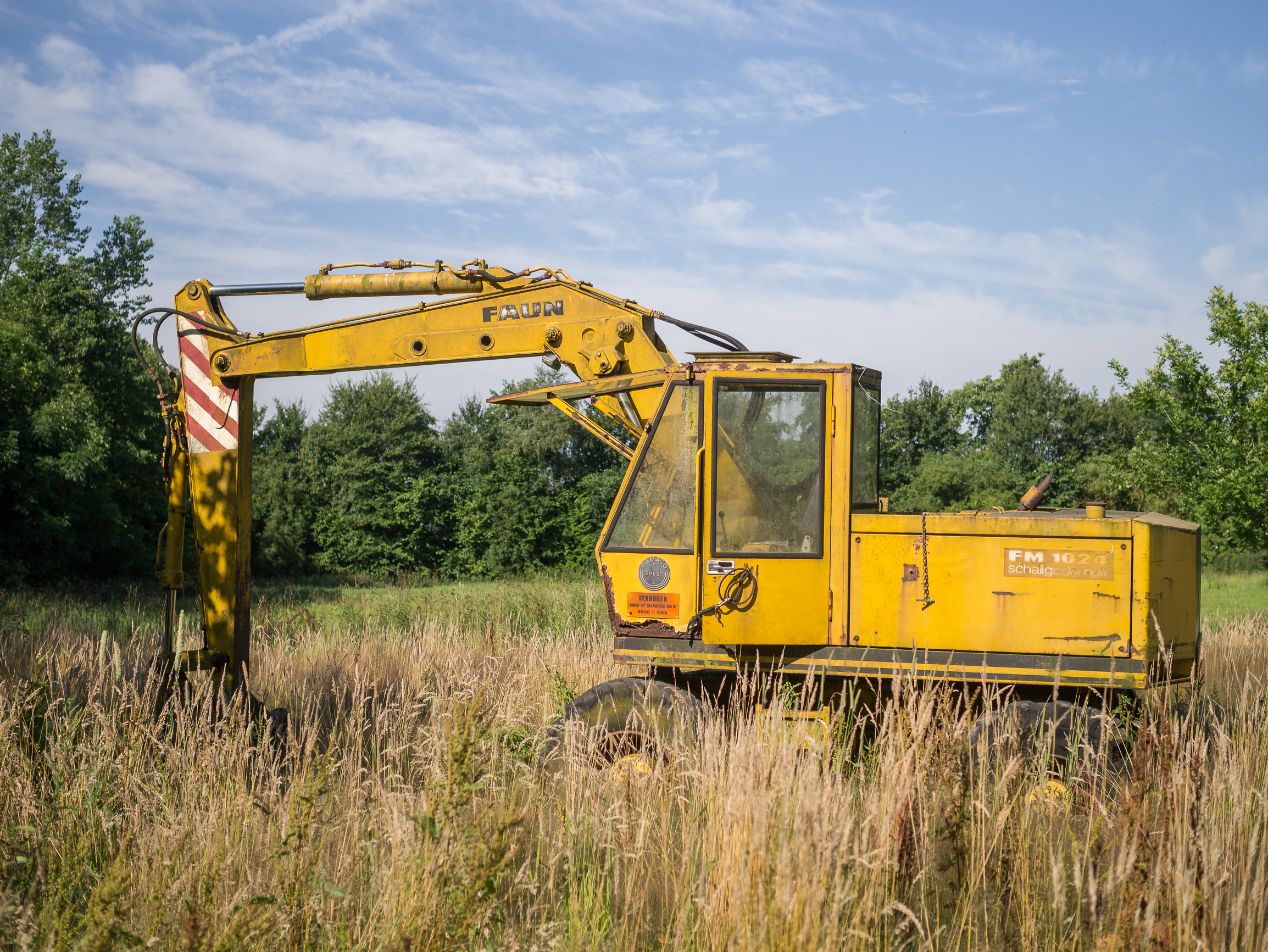

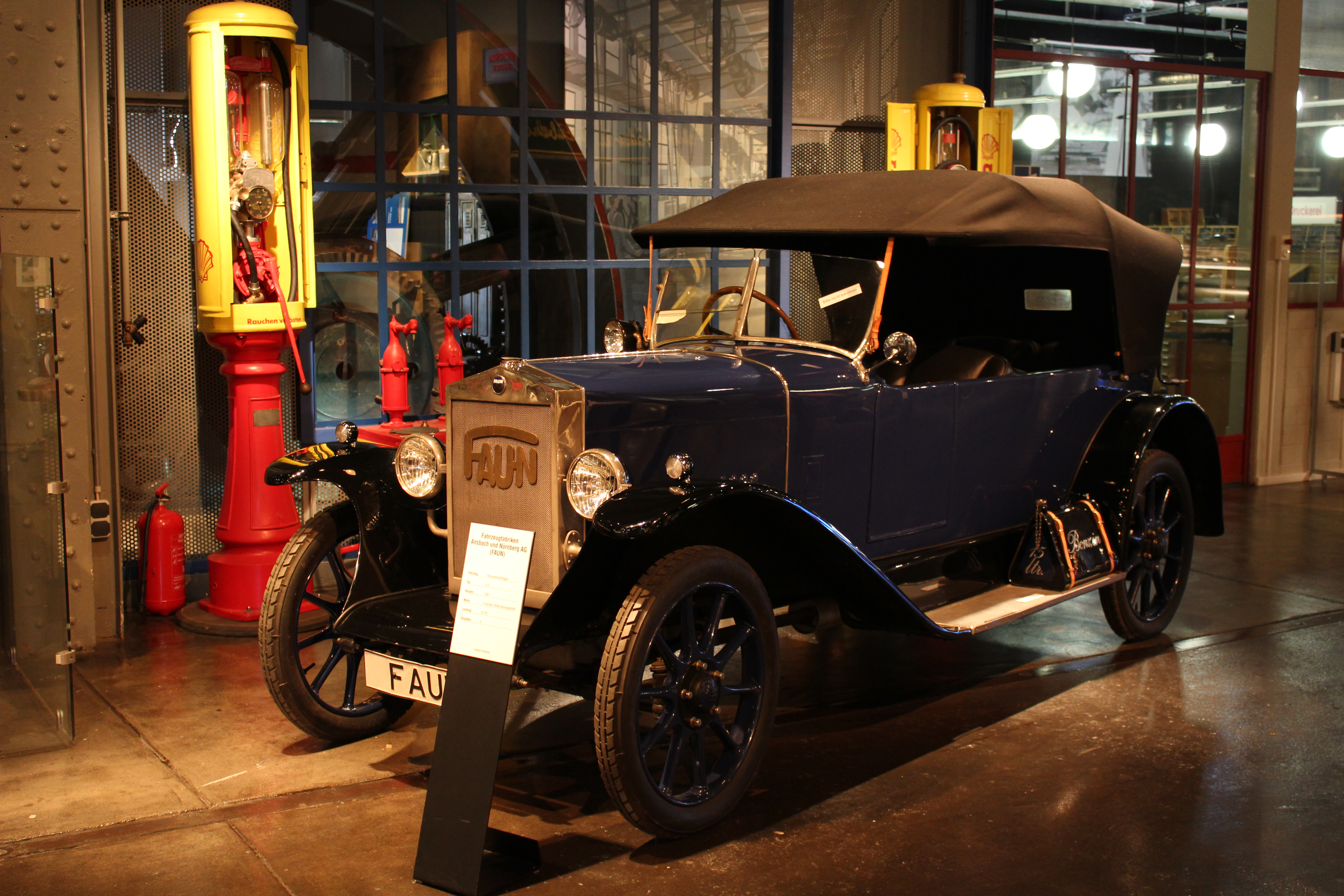

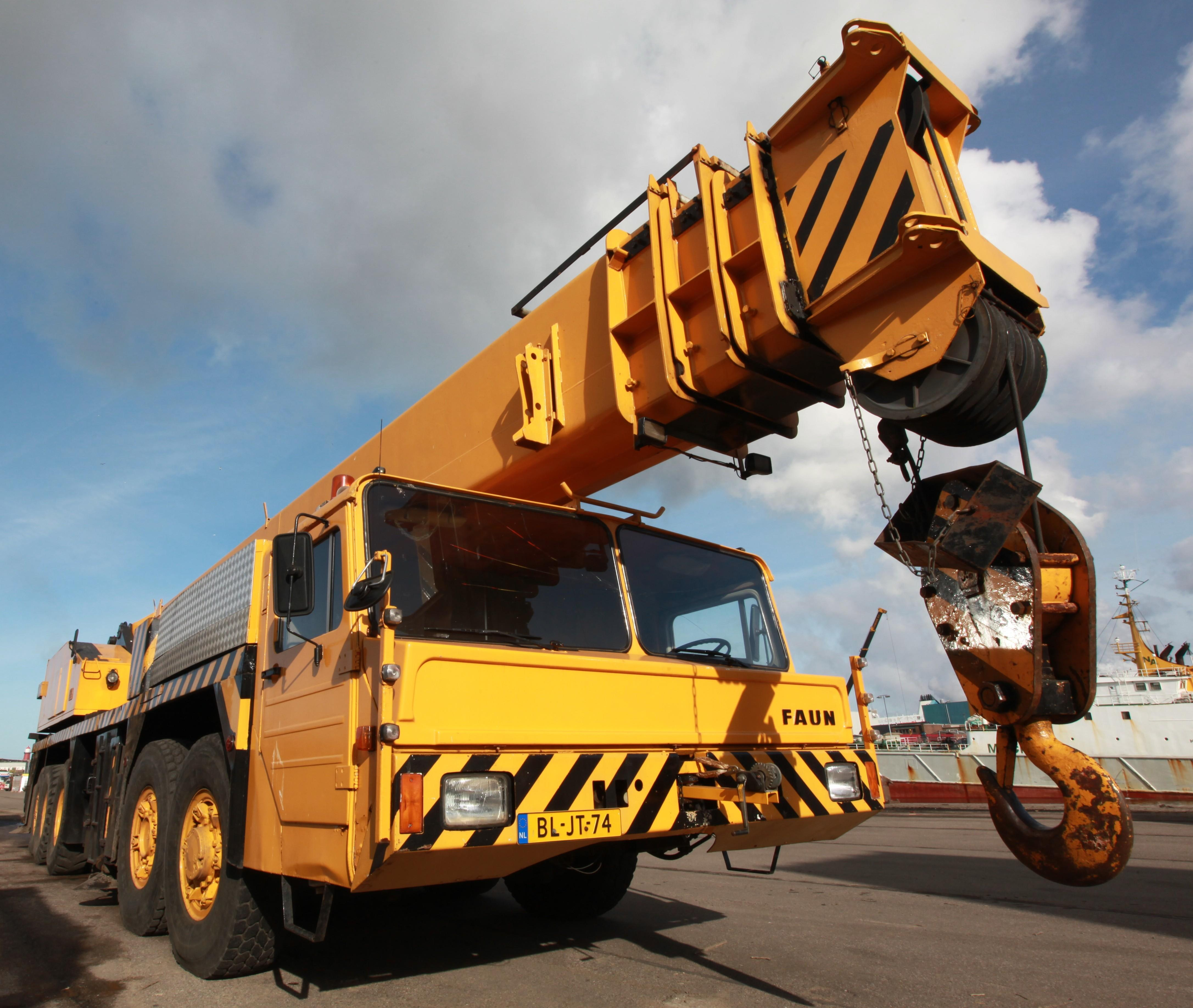

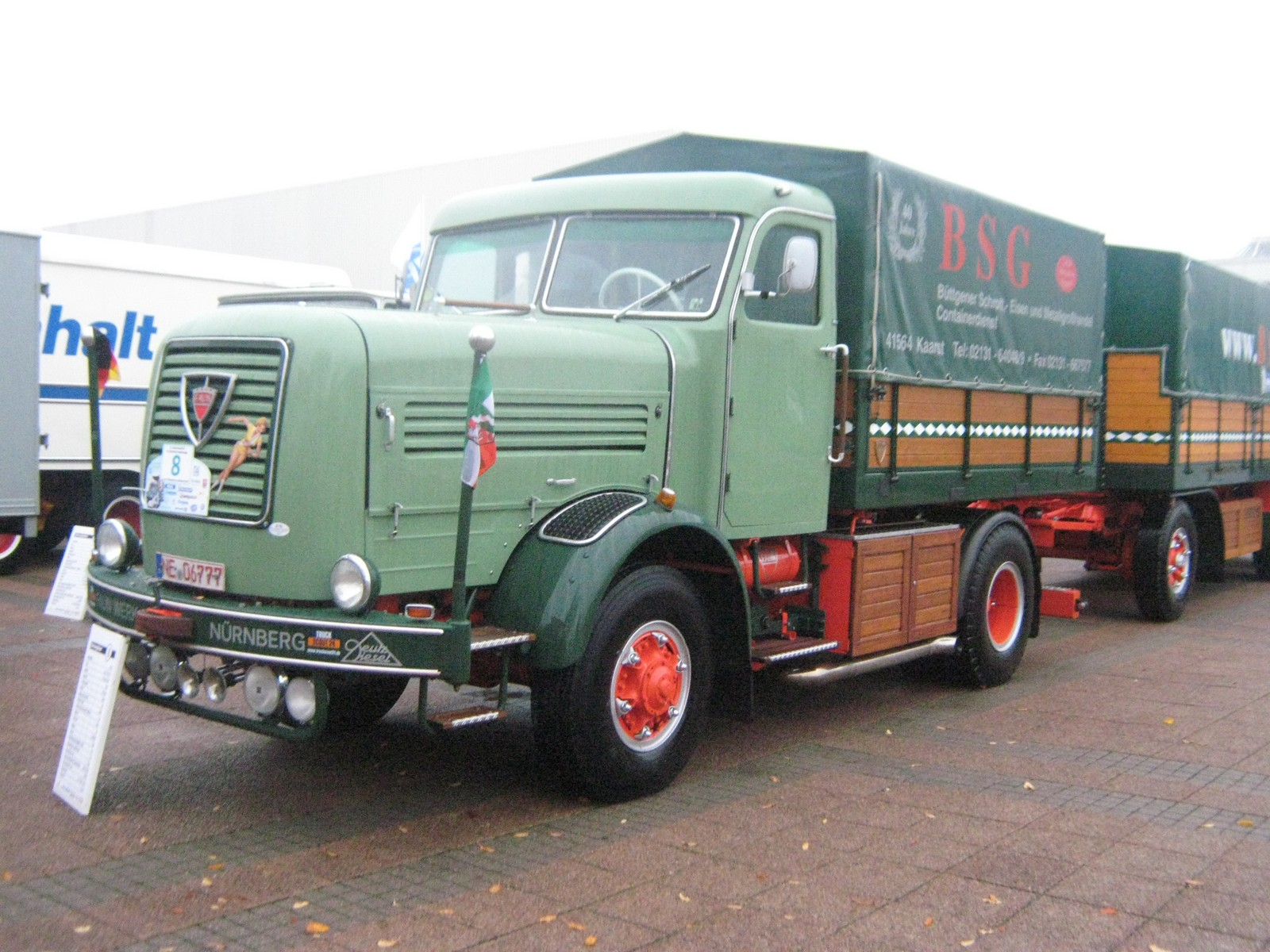

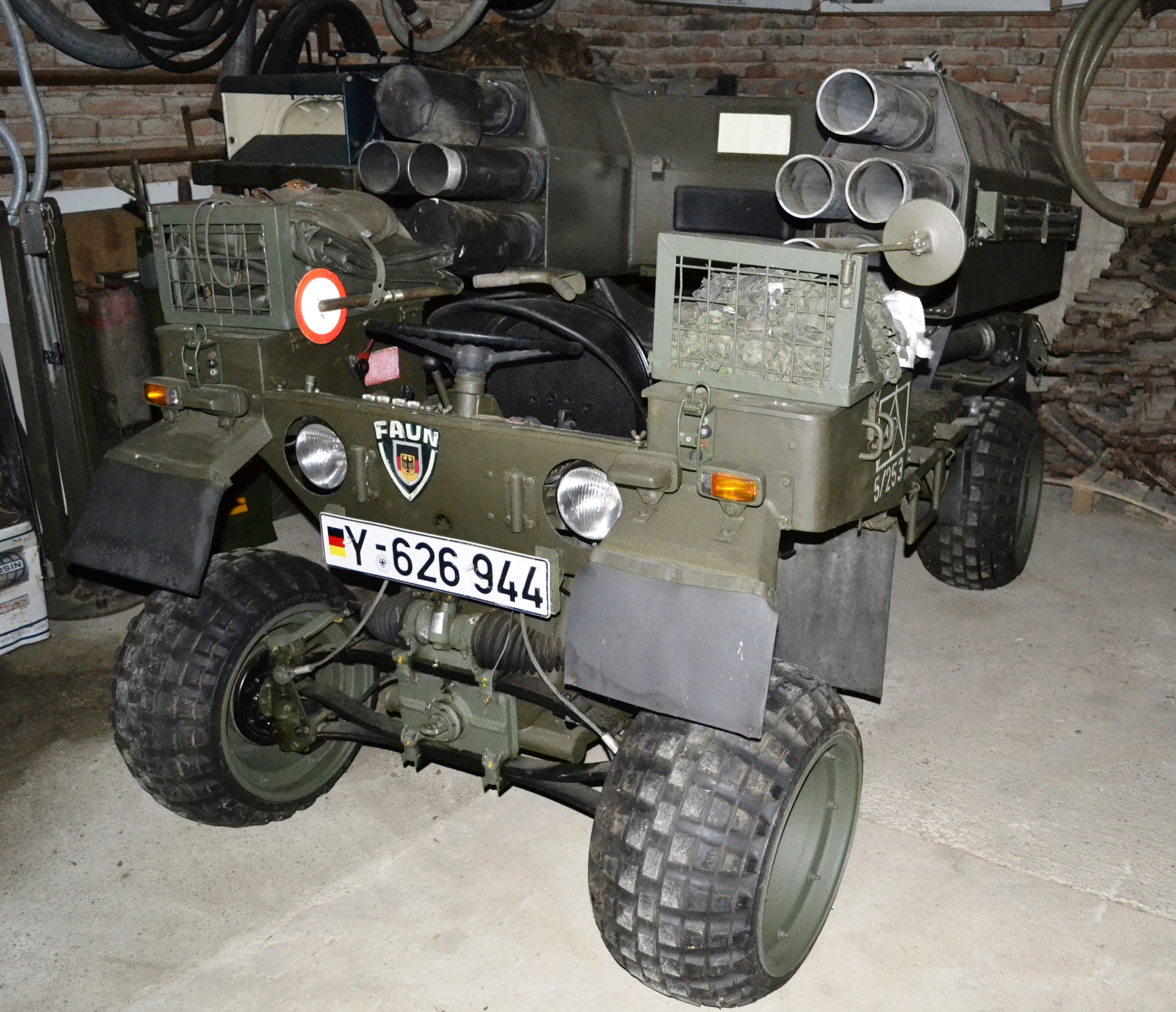
