= Tadano Demag =

Tadano Demag GmbH
- Type: GmbH
- Industry: Mechanical engineering
- Founded: 1827
- Headquarters: Zweibrücken, Germany
- Key people: Noriaki Yashiro (CEO)
- Number of employees: 1,100 (2023)
- Website: Official website

Tadano Demag GmbH is a German manufacturer of mobile cranes based in Zweibrücken, Germany, and part of the Japanese Tadano Group. The company develops and manufactures vehicle-mounted cranes with lifting capacities of up to 1,600 tonnes. The parent holding company for the European activities is Tadano Europe Holdings GmbH, whose other German subsidiary is Tadano Faun GmbH in Lauf an der Pegnitz.

The site in Zweibrücken originates from a workshop founded in 1827 by Christian Dingler and belonged to Demag between 1954 and 2002. Following the acquisition by Terex, the cranes produced there were temporarily delivered under the brand name Terex-Demag. Shortly afterwards the brand name was shortened to Terex. In 2016 the former brand name Demag was reintroduced. After the takeover by Tadano in 2019, the new owner introduced the name Tadano Demag, and since 2021, all models have been carrying the name Tadano.

== History ==
=== Dinglerwerke ===
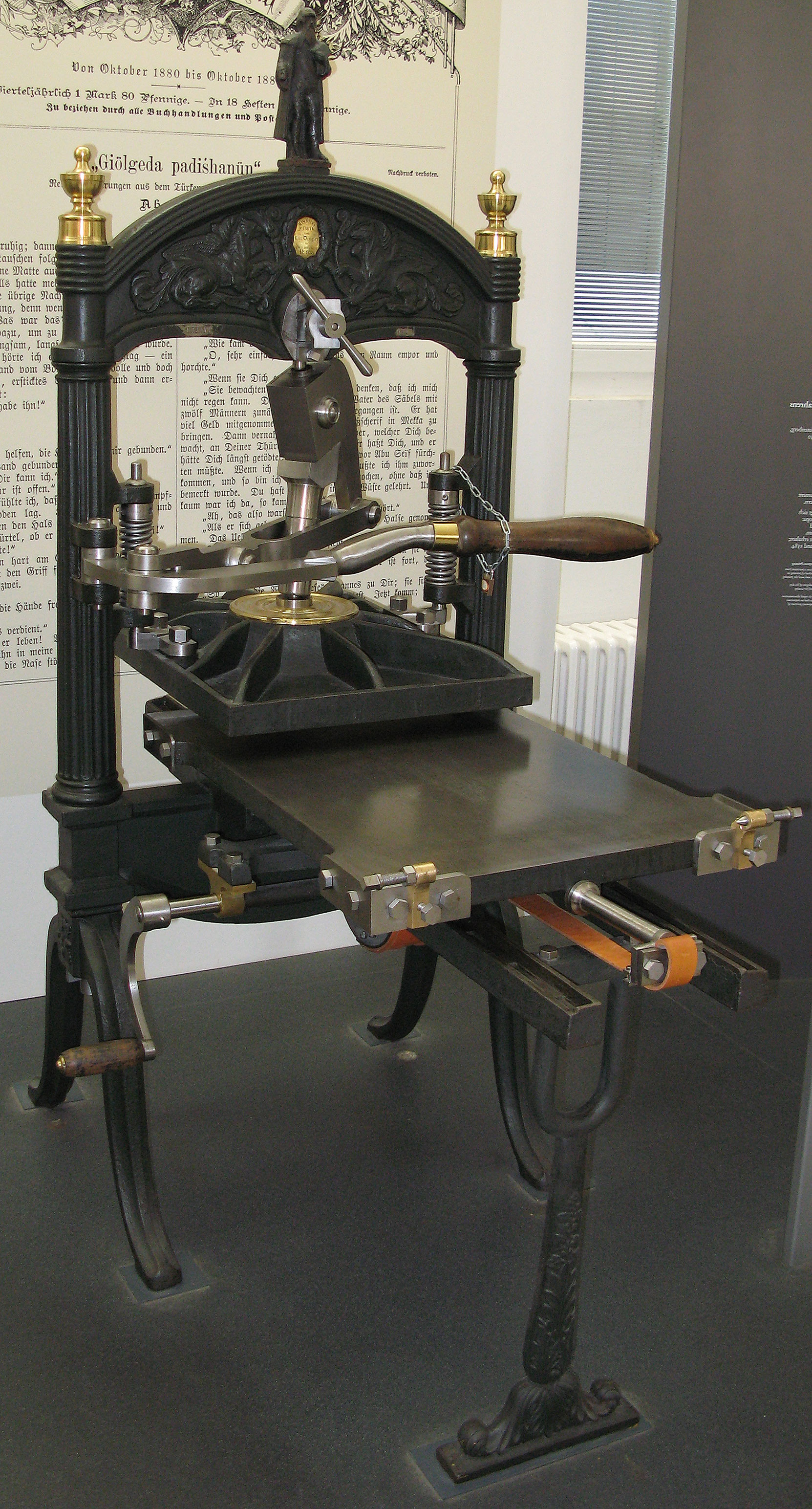
Zweibrücker press from 1845, a toggle press; Deutsches Museum, München

In 1827, Christian Dingler opened a mechanical workshop with ten workers in Zweibrücken and began producing oil and cutting mills. In 1834, he also started manufacturing printing presses. The toggle press developed by Dingler, which he himself called the Zweibrücker press, became known as the Dingler press. This machine was widely used in Europe for many years and contributed to the growth of the company.

In 1834, Dingler acquired the Schönhof estate and established the Dingler Machine Factory there. In 1838, an iron and metal foundry with its own steam engine installation was added. From 1843 onwards, Dingler also built steam engines himself (so-called beam engines). By 1927, more than 3,300 steam engines had been produced, with a combined output of around 260,000 horsepower.

In 1848, Professor Louis Seelinger of the Technical University of Applied Sciences Augsburg was appointed technical director. Under his direction, a large forge with a welding furnace and a 40-hundredweight hammer was commissioned, and the production of water wheels and turbines began.

From 1890 onwards, Dingler also built hoisting and conveying machinery for local mining and steelworks.

In 1897 the company was converted into a joint-stock company and thereafter operated as Dingler’sche Maschinenfabrik AG. In 1906, the company built its first rail-mounted crane. In 1930, Dingler also started building cranes, double vibration rollers, asphalt paving machines and concrete paving machines.

On 28 November 1935, the company was renamed Dinglerwerke Aktiengesellschaft Zweibrücken.

During World War II, parts of Dingler were relocated to the site of the Fürst-Stolberg-Hütte in Ilsenburg for the production of submarine components. In 1944 and 1945, the company also constructed a large transonic wind tunnel inside a mountain in the Ötztal under the code name Zitteraal.

=== Takeover by Demag ===
In 1954, Demag AG acquired a stake in the Dinglerwerke and integrated them into its construction machinery division. In the following years, the Dinglerwerke became fully owned by Demag.

In 1973, Mannesmann AG acquired a majority stake in Demag AG and gradually integrated the company into the group structure. In 1981, as part of a reorganisation of the construction machinery division, the group's mobile crane activities were concentrated in Zweibrücken. In 1983, Mannesmann acquired Demag AG in full.

In 1998, the lattice-boom crawler crane CC 12600 with a lifting capacity of 1,750 tonnes was introduced. It featured a hydrostatic drive, lattice boom sections made of fine-grain steel, auxiliary booms, and Superlift and Ringlift equipment. The main boom had a length of 102 metres, and the lifting capacity could be increased by additional counterweight systems.

=== Acquisition by Terex ===
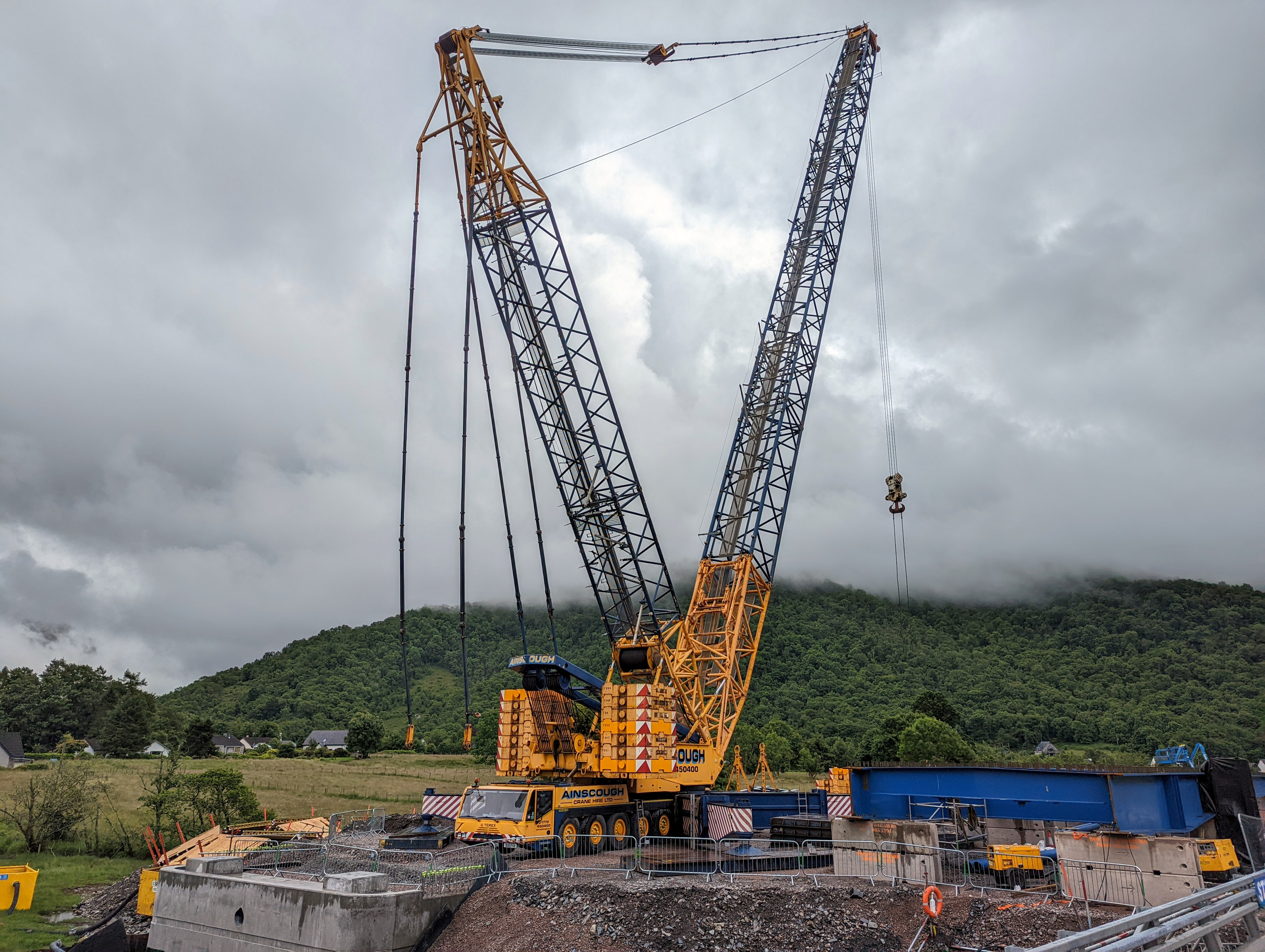
lattice boom crawler crane Terex-Demag TC2800-1

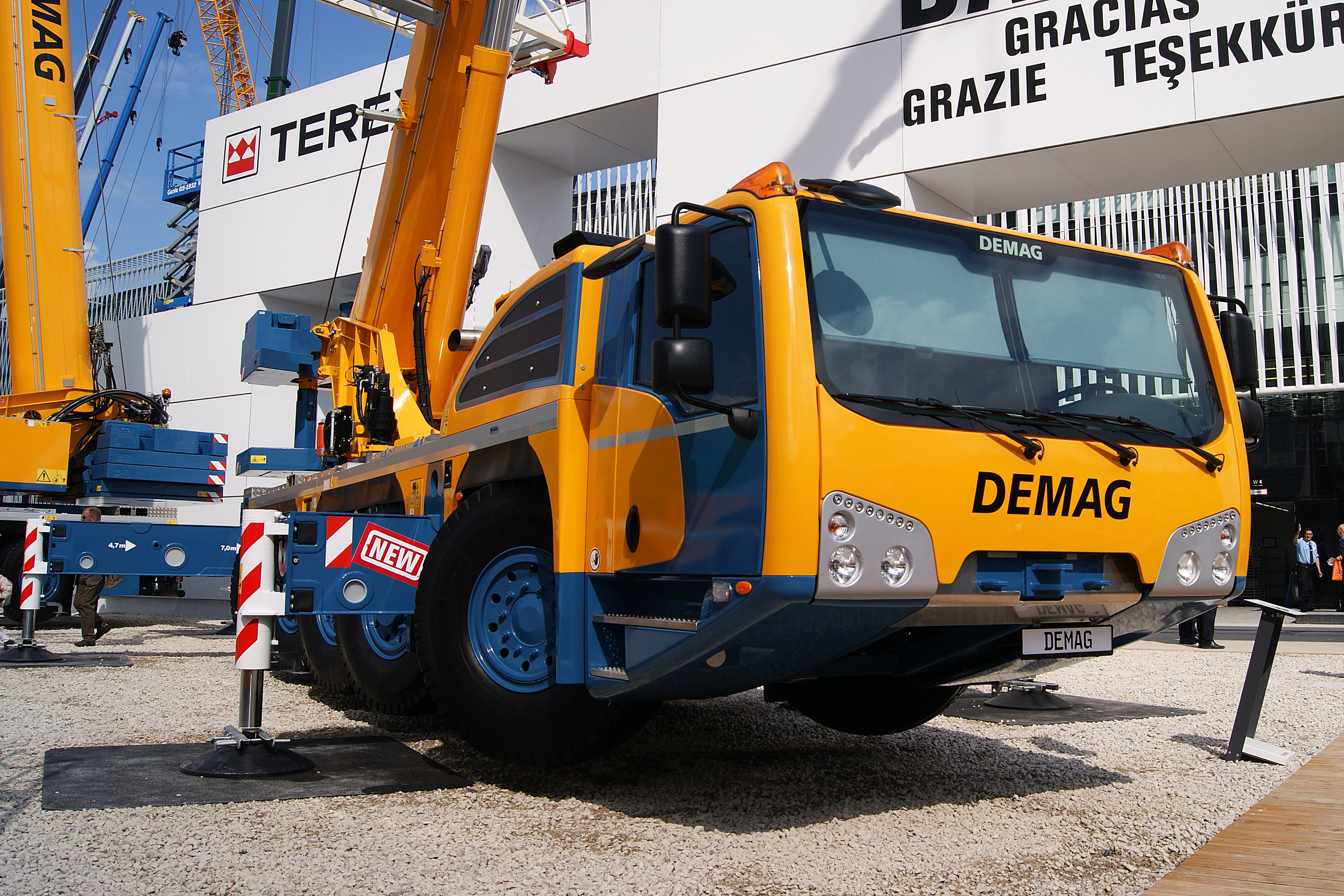
Terex-Demag AC 130-5

Following the takeover of Mannesmann AG by Vodafone, the latter sold the industrial division to a consortium of Siemens and Robert Bosch GmbH. These companies incorporated the business areas relevant to them and sold the remaining parts to various buyers. In 2001, the group separated its mobile crane activities into the newly established Demag Mobile Cranes GmbH.

In 2002, Terex acquired the Zweibrücken plant from Siemens and integrated it into the Terex Cranes business segment.

The branch plant in Bierbach, originally built in 1925, was brought back into operation in 2006. In 2017, the site was closed again and sold to the crane company Steil Kranarbeiten GmbH in Trier.

In 2016, the Demag brand name was reintroduced.

=== Acquisition by Tadano ===
In 2019, the Japanese crane manufacturer Tadano acquired the company and initially continued it under the name Tadano Demag GmbH. In 2020, the group established a holding company in Zweibrücken under the name Tadano Europe Holdings GmbH, which assumed central administrative functions for the European activities, while Tadano Demag GmbH and Tadano Faun GmbH remained as operational production companies.

In 2020, the company filed for protective shield proceedings (Schutzschirmverfahren). On 1 April 2021, the insolvency proceedings were concluded. Following the restructuring, cooperation between the sites in Zweibrücken and Lauf an der Pegnitz was organisationally intensified. Vehicle carrier chassis manufactured in Lauf were delivered to Zweibrücken, where final assembly and delivery of the mobile cranes took place. The Demag brand name was discontinued, and by autumn 2021, all products had been renamed Tadano.

On 1 January 2023, Kenichi Sawada took over the management of Tadano Demag GmbH.

In 2024, the management of Tadano Demag announced job reductions in Zweibrücken and the closure of the Wallerscheid plant. After negotiations with employee representatives, the number of planned job cuts was reduced. An agreement was reached on the reduction of 249 positions, while the main plant in Dinglerstraße in Zweibrücken remained in operation. At the same time, investments in this site were agreed on. Following the sale of the Wallerscheid site in 2024, additional areas were acquired at the Zweibrücken plant for the inspection of large cranes and a repair workshop was established. Production, painting and training facilities were also modernised.

== Company structure ==
Tadano Demag GmbH is based in Zweibrücken and forms part of the Japanese Tadano Group. The parent holding company for the European activities is Tadano Europe Holdings GmbH. On 1 October 2025, Noriaki Yashiro was appointed chairman of the management board (Chief Executive Officer, CEO) of Tadano Demag GmbH.

In 2023, Tadano Demag GmbH employed around 1,100 people in Zweibrücken.

== Products ==
Tadano Demag develops and manufactures mobile cranes at its production site in Zweibrücken. The product range includes multi-axle all-terrain cranes with telescopic booms and crawler cranes with lattice booms. Lattice-boom crawler cranes are built from modular components and transported to construction sites in separate sections, where they are assembled.

Examples include the five-axle AC 5.250-2 all-terrain crane and its extended-boom variant AC 5.250L-2, which has a 79-metre eight-section main boom and lattice extensions that increase the maximum tip height to 112 metres. The company also develops large lattice-boom crawler cranes, such as the CC 78.1250-1, a crawler crane with a lifting capacity of 1,250 tonnes.

== Literature ==
- Dingler’sche Maschinenfabrik AG (1927). Hundert Jahre Dingler. Geschichte und Entwicklung der Werke. Ihr heutiger Stand. Ihre Erzeugnisse (in German). Mannheim.
- Dinglerwerke AG Zweibrücken (1948). Fünfzig Jahre Dingler AG 1897–1947 (in German). Zweibrücken.
- Ludwig, Hans (1992). Die Industrialisierung Zweibrückens "Die Dinglerwerke": Zweibrücken (Pfalz), Bierbach (Saar), Ilsenburg (Harz) und Polysius (Sachsen-Anhalt); ein Stück deutscher Industriegeschichte; die historische Aufarbeitung der Industriestadt Zweibrücken. Nicht nur Rosen und Rosse (in German). Dinglerwerke. Zweibrücken. ISBN 978-3-924171-10-0.
