= Hermann Dingler =

German physician and botanist

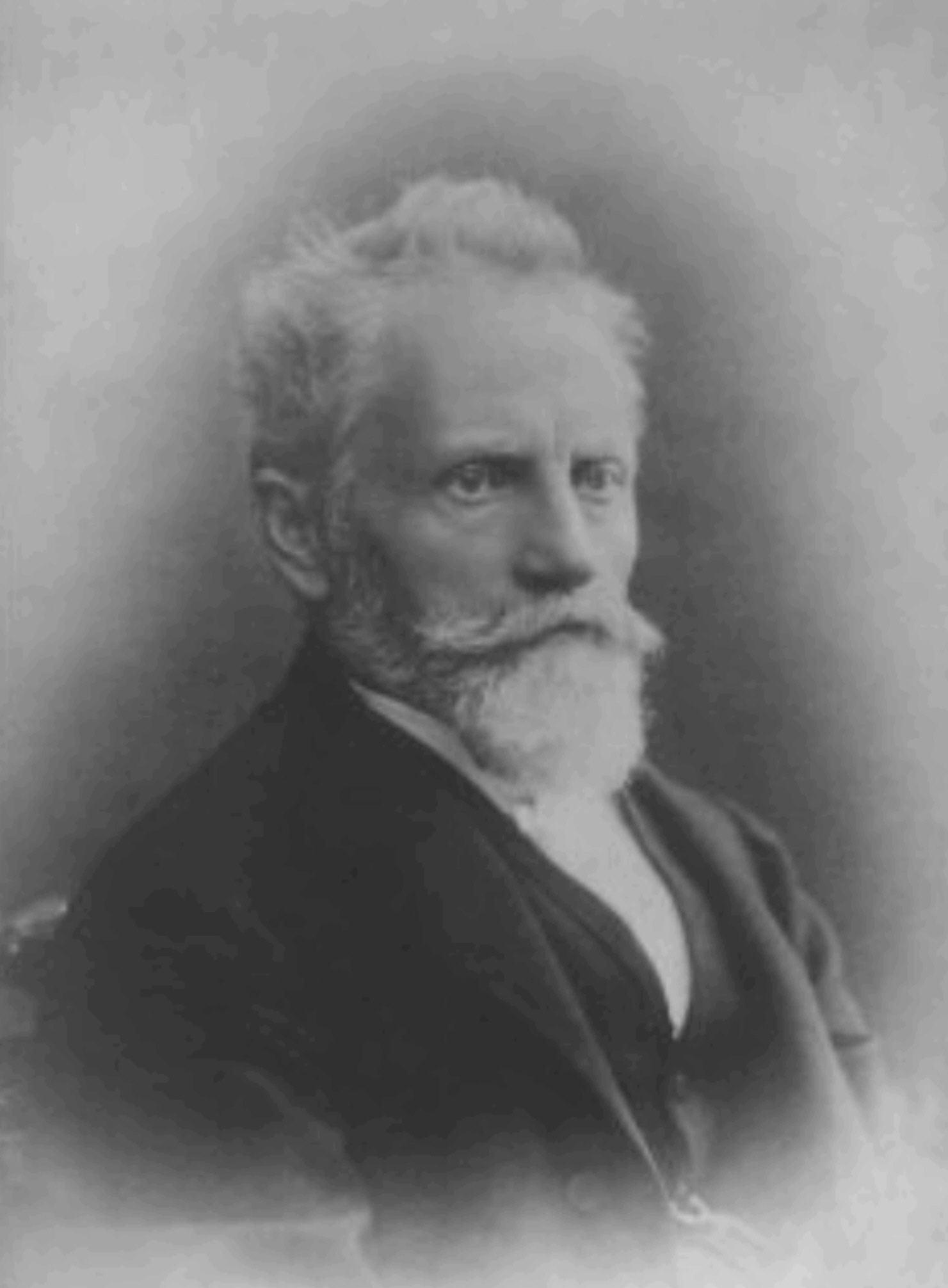
Hermann Dingler (ca. 1910)

Hermann Dingler (23 May 1846 – 30 December 1935) was a German physician and botanist. He was a son-in-law of chemist Emil Erlenmeyer and the father of philosopher Hugo Dingler.

Dingler was born in Zweibrücken. He studied medicine at the University of Zurich, the University of Erlangen, the University of Vienna, and the Ludwig-Maximilians-Universität München, then participated in a botanical study trip to Palestine and Asia Minor. Afterwards, he spent a few years working as a military and railway physician in the Turkish service. In 1883, he obtained his habilitation at the Ludwig-Maximilians-Universität München, then from 1889 to 1910, he taught classes in botany at the Forestry University of Aschaffenburg.

While an instructor at Aschaffenburg and afterwards, he conducted lengthy research trips to Asia Minor (1892), Ceylon (1909), Sicily (1912) and the Caucasus (1914). In 1907, he founded a district committee for nature conservation in western Lower Franconia — his main focus was on the establishment of a reserve for oak trees in the Spessart. From 1906 onward, he published several works associated with the genus Rosa (roses). He died in Aschaffenburg, aged 89.

== Selected works ==
- Ueber das scheitelwachsthum des gymnospermenstammes, 1882.
- Die flachsprosse der phanerogamen, Vergleichend morphologisch-anatomische Studien, 1885.
- Die bewegung der pflanzlichen flugorgane; ein beitrag zur physiologie der passiven bewegungen im pflanzenreich, 1889.
- Ueber asymmetrie in der drüsenanordnung und rotfärbung bei den fiederblättchen mancher rosen, 1906.
