= Christian Dingler =

German businessman (1802-1858)

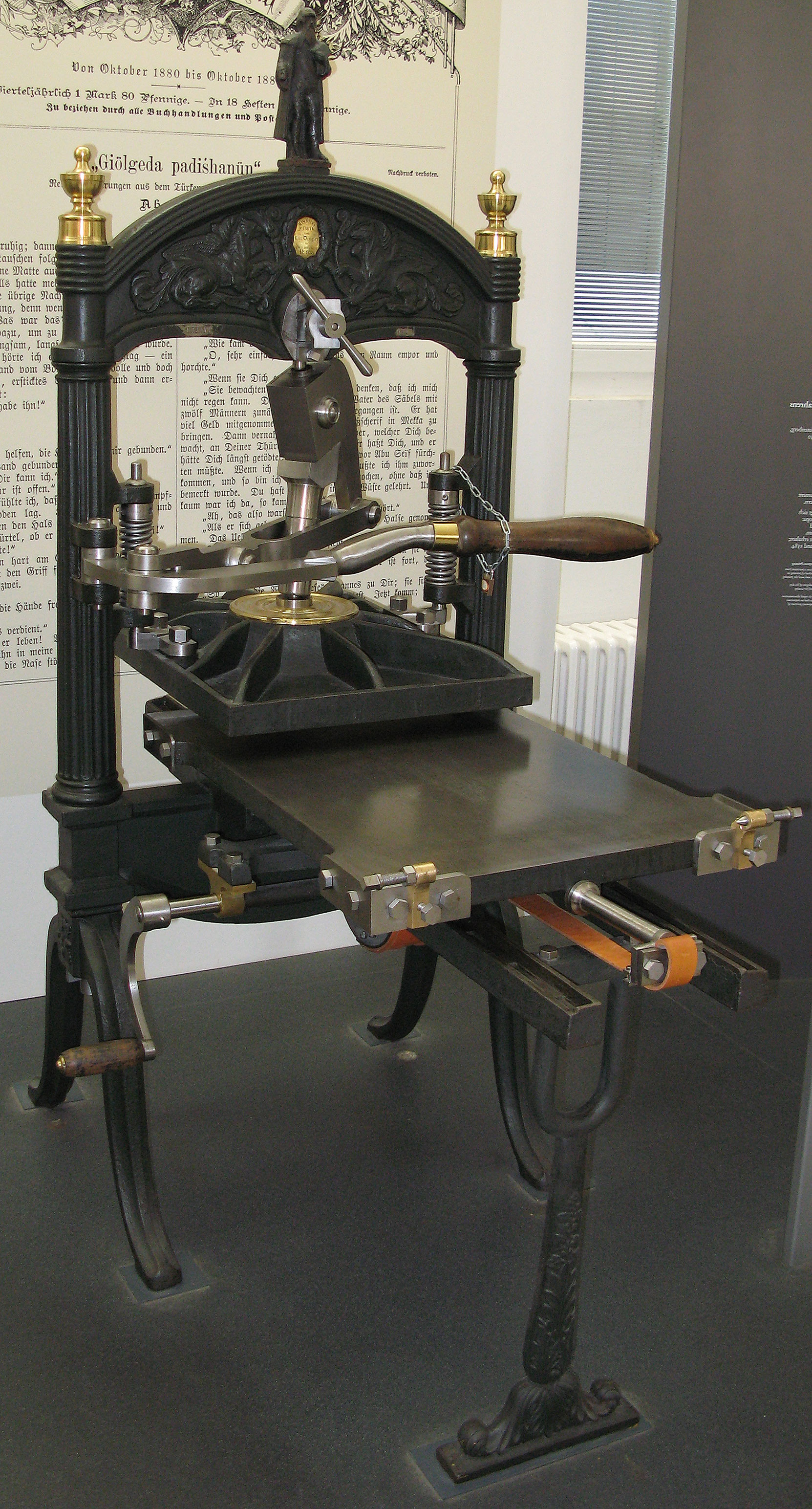
- Zweibrücker-Presse ("Dingler Press") 1945
- Born: Christian Wilhelm Nikolaus Dingler; 15 February 1802; Zweibrücken, Mont-Tonnerre, France
- Died: 18 December 1858 (aged 56); Zweibrücken, Pfalz, Bavaria
- Occupations: Industrialist; Entrepreneur
- Spouse: Friederike Wilhelmine Dorothea Baur (1810–1885)
- Children: 9
- Parent(s): Johann Christian Dingler (1771–1849); Maria Singer

Christian Dingler (15 February 1802 - 18 December 1858) was the founder of the Dingler manufacturing business at Zweibrücken (subsequently subsumed into Terex Cranes Germany) and the Creator of the Dingler Press.

== Life ==
Christian Wilhelm Nikolaus Dingler was born in Zweibrücken, which at the time had recently been annexed into France. After leaving school Dingler embarked upon an apprenticeship at his father's metal working business. By the time he completed his training his apprenticeship had included periods working both at home and abroad.

In 1827 he founded the "Dinglerwerk" business, employing ten people at a premises in the old town centre, producing oil mills, sawmills and, in particular, hand-operated printing presses. Dingler invented a form of Toggle press which he called the "Zweibrücker-press" but which became known as the "Dingler Press". The success of the Dingler Press across much of Europe funded a rapid growth of the business.

In 1834 he was able to purchase the Schönhof Farm on the edge of town to which he moved his factory, quickly expanding it. It was now that he formally founded what is claimed to be where industrialisation in Zweibrücken began. Further expansion followed in 1838 with the installation of a new iron and steel foundry and construction of the first steam engine production facility in the Pfalz region. He began manufacturing steam engines (Beam engines) in 1843. By this time he had already begun, in 1842, to manufacture railway wagons. The timber superstructures of these wagons were made from long pieces of timber and a large carpentry workshop was constructed in which these timber pieces could be worked. The foundry, which by 1848 incorporated a 20-ton hammer, also enabled him to start producing water wheels and turbines. By this time the factory complex was employing 80 people.

Expansion continued. Disaster struck in 1853 when a larger fire in workshop 17 destroyed 17 finished rail wagons, and the preparatory production for a further 100, but the building was reconstructed within six weeks and production resumed. By 1857 a large adjacent site had been acquired and the original foundry had been replaced by a larger one, making further expansion possible. This was the year in which the Dingler Works acquired a rail link, making it possible to deliver locomotives and wagon directly to the network instead of having to move the heavy freight cars down the road to the main railway line at Homburg using horses.

Dingler was involved in other industrial project s in the area. He was a co-founder of the important Frankenholz coal mine, for which he placed the "ground stone". Another large project was the manufacture of ships' boilers for the German navy.
