= Mohammed Fahad Al-Harthi =

Saudi writer and journalist

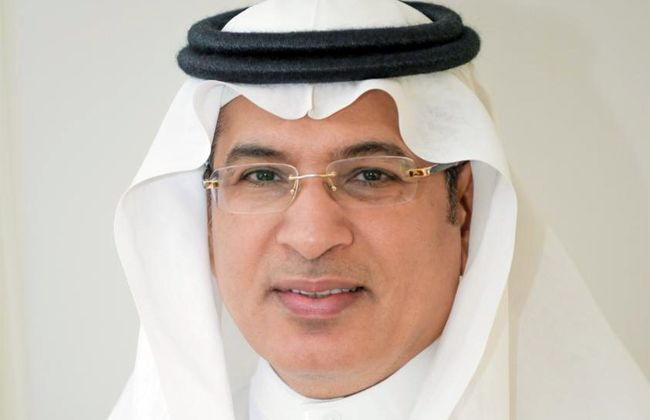
- Occupations: Editor-in-Chief and Media Expert, President of the Saudi Media Forum, President of the Saudi Media Award

Mohammed Fahad Al-Harthi (Arabic: محمد فهد الحارثي) is a Saudi writer, journalist and media expert based in Saudi Arabia. Al-Harthi has been the CEO of the Saudi Broadcasting Authority since August 2020, and the President of the Arab States Broadcasting Union since December 2021. His experience extends to more than 20 years in the fields of traditional and new media. Al-Harthi is also the President of the Saudi Media Forum since 2019, and the President of the Saudi Media Award. Additionally, he is a board member of the World Association of Newspapers and News Publishers (WAN-IFRA), and a member of the Board of Directors of the Saudi Journalists Association. He is the editor-in-chief of a group of magazines and websites such as Arrajol, Sayidaty and AboutHer, owned by the Saudi Research and Marketing Group.

== Work experience ==
Al-Harthi began his career with the London-based Asharq al-Awsat newspaper before joining the English-language newspaper Arab News as a reporter, in addition to being a visiting journalist for the London-based Financial Times. He was then transferred to the Saudi-published newspaper Al Eqtisadiah, where he went from being a journalist to becoming a front-page official, climbing up the ranks until he became editor-in-chief of the publication.

Since 1997, Al-Harthi has been the editor-in-chief of Arrajol magazine, a London-based publication by the Saudi Research and Marketing Group. In 2002, Al-Harthi was presented with the Gulf Excellence Award in recognition of the magazine's success and wide circulation.

In 2004, Al-Harthi was appointed as editor-in-chief of the London-based Sayidaty and Al-Jamila magazines, both publications for the same Group. A year following his appointment as editor-in-chief, he relocated the headquarters of both magazines to Dubai, in Dubai Media City.

Al-Harthi played a major role in transforming Sayidaty into a leading model in the world of Arab journalism and digital media, as the publication's name today represents a wide range of specialized magazines, websites, and platforms in various fields such as: Sayidaty Décor; Sayidaty Mother & Child; Sayidaty Fashion; Sayidaty Magazine in English; Sayidaty.net; Al-Jamila.com; Arrajol’s website; Sayidy.net, Sayidaty Kitchen; Sayidaty TV; Sayidaty Award for Excellence; ALMALL, which is the first digital shopping platform launched by an Arab publication; and AboutHer.com, an English-language site dedicated to highlighting the achievements of Saudi Arabian and Arab women.

From 2013 to 2016, Al-Harthi was also the editor-in-chief of Arab News, which is printed in Saudi Arabia in English for the Saudi Research and Marketing Group. Through the newspaper, he launched the Arab News Dialogue Forum project, which hosts seminars designed to facilitate the discussion of current issues by officials and diplomats.

In September 2020, Al-Harthi became the chief executive officer of the Saudi Broadcasting Authority. In December 2021, he was appointed as the president of the Arab States Broadcasting Union.

He is President of the Media Committee on the occasion of Saudi Founding Day (2022–2023) and President of the Media Committee on the occasion of Flag Day (2023).

== TV shows ==
In 2015, Al-Harthi launched his talk show “Bidoun Shak” (Without Doubt) on MBC, taking on the role of presenter and editor-in-chief of one of the region's most noticeable weekly programs that boldly addresses various social issues (in the style of reality television).

== Awards ==
In 2002, Al-Harthi was awarded with the Gulf Excellence Award 2002 in recognition of his achievements and success in journalism and in the fields of online and print media.

In 2014, Al-Harthi won the Media Innovation Award in Beirut for his achievements in the field of printed, visual, and digital media, achievements which have created success stories and innovative concepts for the media industry in the Arab region.

He is also a founding member of the Young Arab Leaders Forum in Davos Middle East, a member of the Gulf / 2000 project at Columbia University in New York, and a former member of the National Union of Journalists (UK & Ireland), in addition to being a key participant in several Arab and international media conferences and meetings. He also regularly publishes political articles in Al-Sharq Al-Awsat and Al-Bayan Newspapers, and he has a weekly column in Sayidaty magazine and a monthly in Arrajol magazine.
