= Urdu News =

Urdu language newspaper

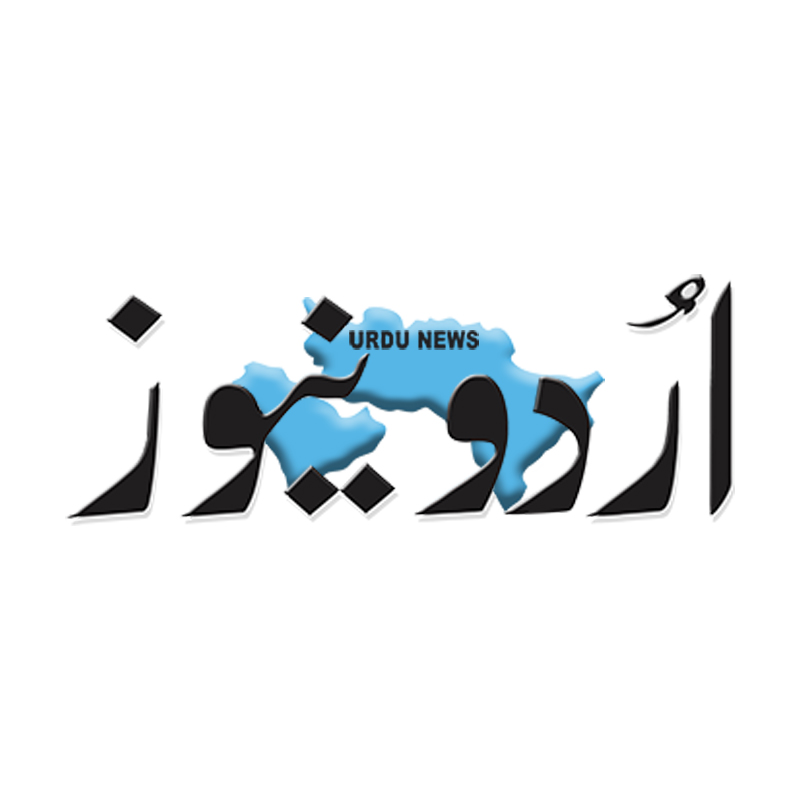
- Owner: Saudi Research and Marketing Group (SRMG)
- Founder: Hisham Hafiz
- Publisher: Saudi Research and Publishing Company
- Editor-in-chief: Raja Zulfiqar Ali
- Founded: 1 September 1994; 32 years ago
- Language: Urdu
- Headquarters: Jeddah
- Sister newspapers: Arab News; Independent Urdu; Al Eqtisadiah; Asharq Al-Awsat
- Website: www.urdunews.com

Urdu News is a Saudi Arabian Urdu language-news website with the focus on Pakistan, Saudi Arabia and other parts of the globe. It was the first daily Urdu newspaper published in Jeddah, Saudi Arabia, and also in other Arab countries. It is owned by Saudi Research and Marketing Group that also operate Independent Urdu and Arab News, Pakistan edition, in Pakistan.

== History and ownership ==
Urdu News was launched by Hisham Hafiz in Jeddah in September 1994 as a weekly newspaper. Later, it became a daily paper. The paper is owned by Saudi Research and Marketing Group (SRMG). SRMG owns many other newspapers such as Arab News, Al Eqtisadiah and Asharq al Awsat and magazines, including Sayidaty, Al Majalla, Al Jamila, Arrajol, Bassim and Hia.

Raja Zulfiqar Ali is the editor-in-chief of the website. Tarek Mishkhes and Farouq Luqman were the former editors-in-chiefs of Urdu News.

== Content ==
The website generally covers news on political, social, sporting, economics and other developments, particularly focusing on central Asian countries. It provides its readers with both news from their home countries, international news, and discussions on local issues. In March 2010, Associated Press of Pakistan and the daily initiated a news exchange program on latest affair or political news.

== Target audience ==
Since the website is being published in Urdu, its primary targets are Urdu speaking natives from Pakistan and expatriates, i.e. Indians and Pakistanis, living in Saudi Arabia.

== See also ==
- List of newspapers in Saudi Arabia
