= List of newspapers in Saudi Arabia =

Most of the early newspapers in the Persian Gulf region were established in Saudi Arabia. The first newspaper founded in the country and in the Persian Gulf area is Al Fallah, which was launched in Mecca in 1920. All of the newspapers published in Saudi Arabia are privately owned.

== Arabic daily newspapers ==
- Al-Bilad
- Al Eqtisadiah
- Al Jazirah
- Al Madina
- Al Riyadeyyah
- Al Riyadh
- Al Watan
- Al Yaum
- Makkah News Paper
- Asharq Al Awsat
- Okaz

== English daily newspapers ==
- Arab News
- Saudi Gazette

== Urdu daily newspaper ==
- Urdu News

== Malayalam daily newspapers-Kerala ==
- Malayalam News
  - Dammam edition
  - Jeddah edition - launched in 1999
  - Riyadh edition
- Madhyamam
  - Abha edition - 1 January 2011
  - Dammam edition - 24 May 2008
  - Jeddah edition - 16 January 2006
  - Riyadh edition - 10 December 2007
- Gulf Thejas
  - Dammam edition - March 2011
  - Jeddah edition - March 2011
  - Riyadh edition - March 2011
- Chandrika

== Defunct daily newspapers ==
These newspapers are no longer published:

- Akhbar Al Dhahran (1954–1956)
- Al-Hayat (1946–2020)
- Al Nadwa (1958–2013)
- Riyadh Daily (1967–1 January 2004)
- Shams

== See also ==
- List of magazines in Saudi Arabia
- Media of Saudi Arabia
- List of companies of Saudi Arabia
