= Arrajol =

Saudi Arabian men's magazine

- Editor-in-chief: Mohammed Nassar
- Categories: Men's magazine
- Frequency: Monthly
- Publisher: Saudi Research and Publishing Company (SRPC)
- First issue: 1 May 1992; 33 years ago
- Company: Saudi Research and Marketing Group (SRMG)
- Country: Saudi Arabia
- Based in: Jeddah
- Language: Arabic

Arrajol (Arabic: الرَجُل, lit. 'The Man') is a monthly men's lifestyle magazine published in Saudi Arabia. The magazine is one of the publications of the Saudi Research and Marketing Group (SRMG).

== History and profile ==
Arrajol was launched in London by Hisham Hafiz in May 1992. The owner of Arrajol is SRMG. SRMG also owns other magazines such as Sayidaty, Al Majalla, Al Jamila, Bassim, Urdu Magazine and Hia as well as newspapers such as Arab News, Al Eqtisadiah and Asharq al Awsat.

Arrajol is published monthly. The magazine is based in Jeddah.

The circulation of Arrajol was 36,566 copies in 2009.

=== Editors ===
From 1997 to 2004, Mohammed Fahad Al Harithi served as the editor–in-chief of Arrajol. Then Tariq Alhomayed served in the post. Then Mohammed Al Harithi again became the editor-in-chief of the monthly and served in the post until 2021 when Mohammed Nassar became the editor-in-chief.

Hadeel Alwash is among the senior editors of the magazine.

== Target audience ==
The magazine mainly targets wealthy, elite and influential men and executives in Saudi Arabia and other Arab countries. It is stated that the same decision-makers who read Asharq Al Awsat for daily news read Arrajol to shape their lifestyle interests.

== Content ==
Arrajol frequently offers articles that are mostly suitable for the Arab men who are rich and have power and an interest in all the aspects of wealth. It covers the life styles and success stories of famous male personalities, particularly businessmen. Therefore, articles address a range of subjects from features on luxury yachts and cars to investment opportunities and private banking issues.

In April 2019 Arrajol featured the prime minister of Pakistan, Imran Khan.

== See also ==
- List of magazines in Saudi Arabia
