= Hia (magazine) =

Arabic women's magazine

- Editor-in-Chief: Mai Badr
- Categories: Women's magazine
- Frequency: Monthly
- Publisher: Saudi Research and Media Group
- First issue: 1 August 1992; 33 years ago
- Company: Saudi Research and Media Group
- Country: Saudi Arabia
- Language: Arabic
- Website: Hiamag.com

Hia is an Arabic monthly women's magazine. It focuses on news in regard to affluent women and businesswomen in the Arab world.

== History ==
The magazine was launched in Riyadh in August 1992. Hia is one of the publications of Saudi Research and Marketing Group (SRMG) which also owns other magazines such as Sayidaty, Al Majalla, Al Jamila, Bassim and Urdu Magazine as well as newspapers such as Arab News, Al Eqtisadiah and Asharq al Awsat. The publisher of Hia is Saudi Research and Publishing Company (SRPC), an affiliated company of SRMG. In January 2013 Mai Badr was appointed editor-in-chief of the magazine. Adnan AlKateb is the editorial manager of Hia.

The Audit Bureau of Circulation data showed that the circulation of the magazine was 43,424 between January and June 2004.

== Content ==
The magazine provides news about luxury lifestyle, fashion, beauty, jewelry, travel and health. It also covers interviews with renowned personalities and celebrities such as Gwyneth Paltrow, Donna Karan, Princess Dana Al Khalifa of Bahrain, and Kim Kardashian. Ipsos surveys continuously indicate that it is the top magazine among affluent Arab women.

== See also ==
- List of magazines in Saudi Arabia
