= Salman bin Yousuf Al Dossary =

Saudi Arabian politician (born 1968)

His Excellency Salman bin Yousuf Al Dossary
- سلمان يوسف الدوسري
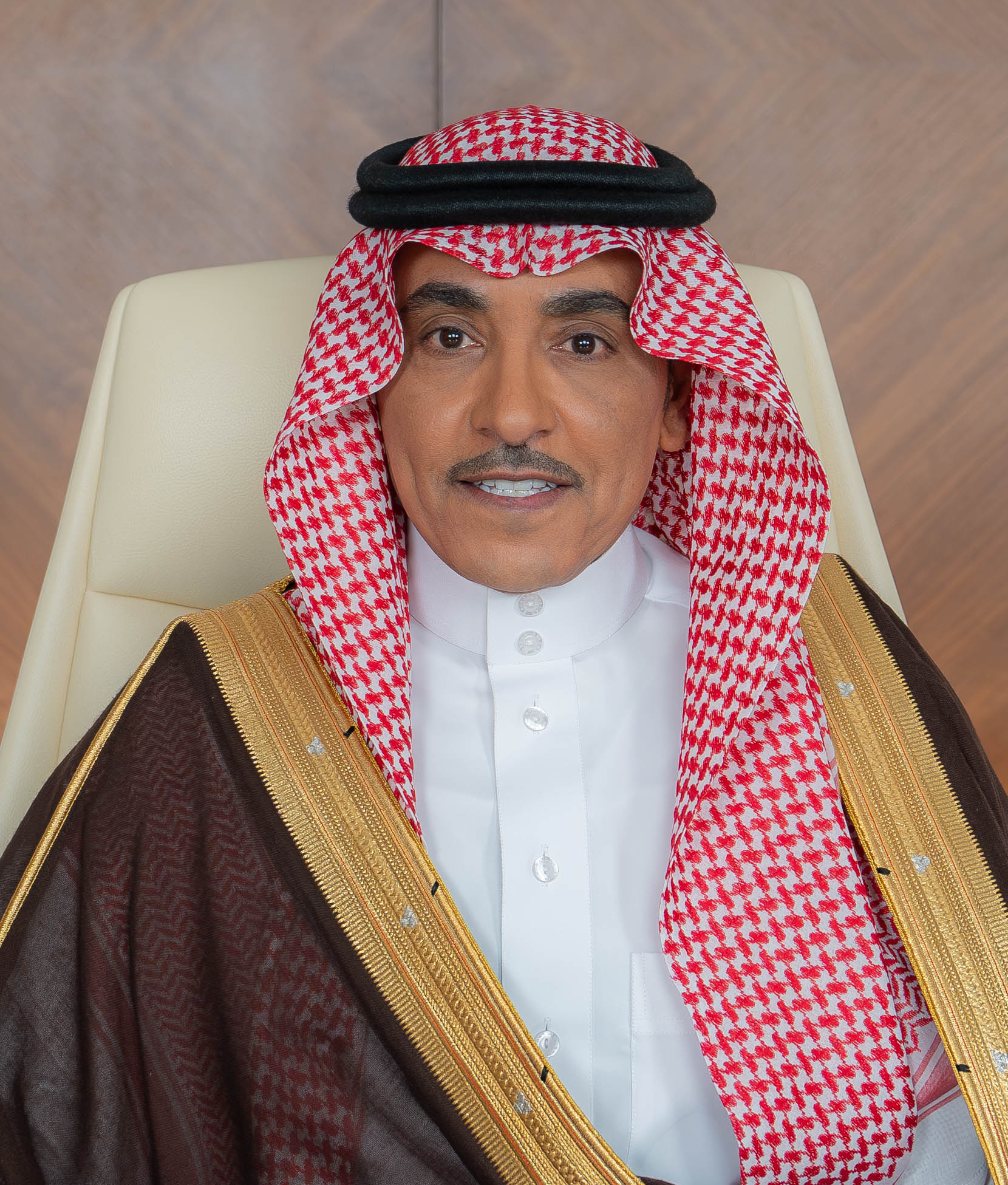
- Al Dossary in 2024

Minister of Media
- Incumbent
- Assumed office 5 March 2023
- Monarch: Salman
- Prime Minister: Mohammed bin Salman
- Preceded by: Majid bin Abdullah Al Qasabi (acting)

Personal details
- Born: 1968 (age 57–58) Khobar, Saudi Arabia

Salman bin Yousif Al Amour Al Dossary is the Minister of Media of Saudi Arabia, appointed on 5 March 2023 by Royal Decree. He is also a journalist and media executive who previously served as editor-in-chief of the London-based newspaper Asharq al-Awsat from 2014 to 2016.

== Early life and education ==
Born in Al-Khobar city, Eastern Province of Saudi Arabia in September 1968, Al-Dossary is married and has three children. He holds a Bachelor's degree in Management and Economics. Before becoming a journalist, he worked for the Ministry of Education.

Prior to his current post, Al-Dossary was the editor-in-chief of Al Eqtisadiah, which specialized in finance, business and economics.

== Career as journalist ==
After graduating from the Faculty of Administration and Economics, al-Dossary started his journalism career in the Saudi Research and Marketing Group (SRMG) in 1998 until present. He joined Asharq al-Awsat as its Bahrain correspondent in 2004, and was promoted to the position of Managing Editor in the UAE in 2006. In Dec 2009, al-Dossary was appointed assistant editor-in-chief of Asharq al-Awsat in its main offices in London, before he was appointed chief editor of Al Eqtisadiah newspaper in 2011, and then he became editor-in-chief of Asharq al-Awsat on 1 July 2014. 23 November 2016 was his last day as Editor-in-chief for Asharq al-Awsat We thank former Editor-in-Chief Salman Al-Dossary for all his exceptional efforts during the last period, and he will continue as a columnist at Asharq Al-Awsat," concluded Prince Badr.

== Al-Rajol magazine ==
Al-Dossary also holds the position of chief editor of the Arabic-language al-Rajol magazine, a monthly magazine published by the SRMG. Launched in 1992, the magazine focuses on social aspects of life in the Arab world, as well as on fashion, cars and other men related news. Through an innovative strategy, al-Dossary contributed enormously to the magazine's increasing popularity by selecting distinguished characters to appear on its cover, and by developing its website and its account on social networking websites to enable a wider reach among readers in the Middle-East region and worldwide.

== The Majalla magazine ==
In 2014, Salam Al-Dossary was appointed chief editor of The Majalla, a monthly political magazine published in London in both Arabic and English. Ever since it was launched in 1980, Al-Majalla has been a distinguished political magazine in the Arab world politics. Throughout the 1980s and 1990s, al-Majalla remained the most important Arabic-language magazine published and distributed all over the world.

== High profile interviews ==
Salman Al-Dossary conducted a number of interviews with decision-makers and state officials, most important of whom are the following:

- Egyptian President Abdelfattah al-Sisi
- Yusuf bin Alawi bin Abdullah, Omani Minister of Foreign Affairs
- Sheikh Rashed bin Abdullah Al Khalifa, Bahraini Minister of Interior
- Sheikh Hamdan bin Mohamed Bin Rashed Al Maktoum, Dubai Crown Prince.
- Sheikh Khaled bin Hamad Al Khalifa, Bahraini Minister of Foreign Affairs
- King Salman bin Abdulaziz Al Saud, King of the Kingdom of Saudi Arabia
- King Hamad bin Isa Al khalifa, King of the Kingdom of Bahrain

== Social contributions ==
Salman Al-Dossary was honored in several occasions in recognition of his role as a journalist as well as his contributions as a chief editor in such events. Salman al-Dossary provided coverage of social events as part of his social responsibility, setting a good example of the media responsibility.

In October 2014, the Saudi Cabinet of Ministers approved the appointment of Salman al-Dossary among three other board members to represent the private sector in the charity.
Salman al-Dossary is also the founder and member of the managing board of a charitable Society for collecting and upgrading used PCs to be distributed to social and educational institutes.
