= Khaled Al Maeena =

Editor-in-Chief of Saudi Gazette

- Born: 1954 or 1955 (age 71–72)
- Education: University of Karachi
- Occupations: Journalist, columnist and editor-in-chief
- Spouse: Samar Fatany
- Children: Dania, Hassan, Lina, Yasser and Sara
- Parent: Abdulrahim Almaeena
- Website: Official website

Khaled Al Maeena (born 1954/1955) is a veteran Saudi journalist, commentator, businessman and the former editor-in-chief of the Saudi Gazette. He is regarded as a liberal. He is also the patron of Muslim Mirror and the managing partner of Quartz, a communications company, as well as a director at Abeer Medical Group.

== Education ==
Al Meena received his education in different countries, including the United States, Britain and Pakistan. He attended the St. Patrick's College in Karachi and graduated with a degree in journalism from the University of Karachi.

== Career ==
Al Maeena began his career in 1972, joining the Saudi Arabian Airlines (Saudia) as an intern. He worked at several positions in the airline including as chief editor of Saudi World. In 1982, he became the editor-in-chief of Arab News. Al Maeena was one of four journalists to cover the resumption of diplomatic ties between Saudi Arabia and Russia in 1990. He left his post in 1993, becoming the CEO of the Saudi Public Relations Company (SPRC), a position he held for five years. He returned to the top editor's post at Arab News in 1998 and held the post until October 2011.

He was appointed editor-in-chief of Saudi Gazette on 2 April 2012. His term ended in February 2014 and he was succeeded by Somayya Jabarti in the post. Almaeena occasionally contributes commentary columns for Gulf News, Al Eqtisadiah, Times of Oman, Asian Age, The China Post, Asharq Al-Awsat, Al Madina and Urdu News. He was also a Saudi television news anchor, talk show host, radio announcer and lecturer. Khaled Almaeena also serves as a Member of advisory board for Gulf at TAIB Bank.

== Relations ==
Al Maeena was reported to be close to King Fahd and King Abdullah. He is also considered to have close relations with the new king, Salman.

== Jeddah floods ==
As a resident of Jeddah, Al Maeena wrote a letter to Khaled Al Faisal, governor of Makkah after the catastrophic 2009 Jeddah floods. The letter was published in Arab News where he was editor-in-chief.

== Awards ==
Al Maeena was honored with the third highest civilian award Sitara-e-Pakistan in 2008 by the Pakistan government. On April 20, 2019, he received a lifetime achievement award at the second International Media Gala (IMG), organized by Arab News in Dubai.
