= Hani Naqshabandi =

Saudi journalist and writer (1963–2023)

- Born: 1963; Medina, Saudi Arabia
- Died: 24 September 2023 (aged 60)
- Education: King Abdulaziz University
- Occupations: Journalist and novelist

Hani Naqshabandi (Arabic: هاني نقشبندي; 1963 – 24 September 2023) was a Saudi journalist, writer and novelist who had been included in several press positions, including editor-in-chief of Sayidaty Magazine and the Majalla political magazine, and co-founded The Man magazine.

== Personal life ==
Hani Ibrahim Naqshabandi, a Saudi journalist and writer, born in Medina in 1963, was a graduate of King Abdul-Aziz University in Jeddah with a degree in international relations. Since 1984, Hani had been a media journalist, has worked in Saudi newspapers and edited the Arabic-language Sayidaty magazine and The Majalla magazine in London, and presented the television show "Hawar with Hani" on Dubai TV. In 2007, he was published in Beirut for the short novel Embezzlement. In a short period of time, although it was not published by some Arab countries, the novel was able to be reprinted in Arabic six times and was translated into Russian.

Naqshabandi died on 24 September 2023, at the age of 60.

== Career ==
Hani Naqshbandi appeared in the press and media and went on to the novel, where he published his first novel in early 2007 entitled Embezzlement and printed four editions so far. A novel that has provoked controversy and criticism. And a novel of peace in 2009. A television programme on Dubai TV, Hawar Hani, presented a socio-humanitarian political programme in which he discussed Arab issues on the ground. He recently wrote articles in several newspapers and websites. The novel provoked controversy and criticism. Salah Fadl said about him that Naqshbandi would play a role in the Saudi novel, such as that of the late writer Ihsan Abdul Quddous.

== Journalism ==
- Editor-in-chief of Sayidaty Magazine.
- Majalla magazine.
- He co-founded The Man magazine.
- Deputy Editor-in-Chief of Al-Sharq al-Adsat newspaper.
- He presented the program " Hawar Hani" at Dubai TV, in which he hosted a group of political, literary, and scientific figures.

== Literature ==
- A 2007 novel Embezzlement.
- Salam's novel was published in 2009.
- One Night in Dubai was published in 2011.
- The novel Half of a Respected Citizen 2013.
- The novel The Doctors of Paradise 2015.
- The book Jews under the Microscope in 1986.
- The book The Puzzle of Happiness in 1990.
- Al-Khatib's novel was published in 2017.
- Novel (dream story). This novel has been transformed into a series called "The Maker of Dreams".
