= Al Faisal Magazine =

Monthly cultural publication established in 1977

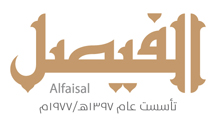

Al Faisal Magazine is a monthly cultural publication established in 1977, published by the Al-Faisal Cultural House, affiliated with the King Faisal Center for Research and Islamic Studies. Its inaugural issue was released in Rajab 1397 AH / June 1977 CE. The magazine's first editor-in-chief, Alawi Taha Al-Safi, outlined its mission in the opening editorial, stating: "Al-Faisal Magazine is dedicated to pursuing unembellished truth without sensationalism or fabrication, adopting a realistic approach free from emotionalism or tension, and maintaining a scholarly spirit without exaggeration or defamation."

== See also ==
- Nature Arabic Edition
- Rotana Magazine
- Sayidaty
- Al Yamamah (magazine)
