= Al Arab (magazine) =

Arabic magazine in Beirut, Lebanon (1966–2001)

- Editor: Hamad Al Jassir
- Categories: History magazine; Geography magazine
- Frequency: Monthly (1966–1973); Bimonthly (1973–2001)
- Founder: Hamad Al Jassir
- Founded: 1966
- First issue: November 1966
- Final issue: 2001
- Country: Lebanon; Saudi Arabia
- Based in: Beirut; Riyadh
- Language: Arabic

Al Arab was an Arabic geographic and history magazine which was published between 1966 and 2001. It was one of the publications established by the Saudi Arabian journalist, historian and writer Hamad Al Jassir after Al Yamamah magazine and Al Riyadh daily. Al Arab was first published in Beirut and then in Riyadh.

== History and profile ==
Al Arab was established by Hamad Al Jassir as a monthly magazine in Beirut in 1966, and the first issue appeared in November that year. Al Jassir also edited the magazine until his death in September 2001. In 1973 its frequency was switched to bimonthly due to high costs of printing. In 1975 Al Jassir returned to Riyadh and published the magazine there.

Al Arab was similar to the American magazine National Geographic in terms of its coverage. The topics included the study of Arabic language, history, and geography of the Arabian Peninsula. It frequently featured articles on the Arab tribes and the problems of tribal heritage. Al Jassir also published articles in the magazine in relation to the noble families of central Arabia. Al Arab folded in 2001 shortly after the death of its founder.

== See also ==
- List of magazines in Saudi Arabia
