= Abdulah Bin Bijad Al Otaibi =

Abdullah bin Bijad Al Otaibi / AlHashishi (Arabic: عبد الله بن بجاد العتيبي ) is a Saudi writer and researcher, is a member of the board of advisors at Al Mesbar Studies and Research Centre. Al Otaibi has written for many Arabic and Saudi newspapers such as Al Ittihad, Okaz, and Al Hayat (London). He currently contributes a weekly article to Asharq Al-Awsat, Al Ittihad, and Al Majalla. He has published several research papers for Al Mesbara's monthly publication including "Loyalty and Enmity: the Ideology of the Political Opposition in Islam" and "Saudi Arabia and the Muslim Brotherhood". Al Otibi works as a consultant at The Middle East Broadcasting Center Group and has also worked on and supervised various media documentaries and programs for Al Arabia Channel.

On 9 March 2008, Wahhabi cleric Sheikh Abdurrahman Al-Baraak issued a fatwa calling for his prosecution or for him to be "killed as an apostate from the religion of Islam".
