= Jomana Alrashid =

Saudi media executive

- Born: 1988 (age 37–38); Saudi Arabia
- Education: SOAS University of London (BA), City University of London (MA)
- Occupation: Media executive
- Awards: Time 100 Next 2025

Jomana R. Alrashid is a Saudi media executive and former journalist. She is the CEO of the Saudi Research and Media Group and the chair of the Red Sea Film Festival Foundation and Thmanyah. She was previously a communications aide to the Saudi Arabia Embassy to the United Kingdom. She was named on the Time 100 Next in 2025, and also has been named on the Forbes Middle East Most Powerful Businesswomen list in 2023, 2024, and 2025.

== Early life ==
She was born in 1988 in Saudi Arabia. She went on to attend the School of Oriental & African Studies, where she earned her BA in political science in 2011, before earning her MA in international journalism from the City University of London in 2013. She worked as a correspondent for Arab News and then for Al Riyadh. She also concurrently was media advisor and communications director at the Saudi Arabia Embassy to the United Kingdom.

== Professional life ==
Since October 2020, she has been the CEO of the Saudi Research and Media Group (SRMG), which is the largest media group in the MENA region and owns a variety of different media sources, including Arab News, Asharq, Billboard Arabia, and others. It also is a minority investor of the Penske Media Corporation, which owns Variety and other news sites. During her time as CEO, the SRMG has pursued AI-related ventures. She has opined that AI will never replace human creativity, but a SRMG subsidiary developed a campaign utilizing an artificial intelligence-made rendition of deceased Saudi Arabian singer Etab's voice and image. She has also discussed supporting women in the media industry. She stated that her appointment was part of a vision that "trickled down from the highest levels of government to... entities such as SRMG", but also stated each SRMG publication maintains its own independent editorial approach. SRMG has been categorized as Captured Public/State-Managed by the State Media Monitor every year since 2022.

She also is the chair of the Red Sea Film Foundation, which she took over not long after the unbanning of Saudi cinema in 2017. During her time leading the foundation, she has had the first Saudi film selected for Cannes in the form of Norah. She has also led the Foundation through its relocation to Al-Balad, Jeddah. In 2024, she led the Red Sea Film Festival to its fourth year, with multiple notable actors appearing including Will Smith and Ranveer Singh.

She also is chair of Thmanyah, an Arabic podcast platform which is also 51% owned by the Saudi Research and Media Group. After Thmanyah became partially owned by the SRMG, the company received exclusive regional broadcast rights to the Saudi Pro League, the King Cup, the Saudi Super Cup, and the Saudi First Division League. In 2026, SRMG announced that their stake in Thmanyah would increase to 75%. She sits on the board of directors of King Saud University and Argaam Investment Company, as well as the board of trustees of the Diriyah Biennale Foundation and the King Salman Center for Disability Research. She was also an executive producer of the 2026 film In the Grey, the 2024 film The Ministry of Ungentlemanly Warfare, and the 2023 film Ferrari.

She appears without a headscarf online, but at functions covers her hair.

== Awards ==
She was named on the Time 100 Next in 2025, where she was called "an architect of the Middle East's shifting media landscape". She was named on the Forbes Middle East Most Powerful Businesswomen list in 2023, when she ranked twenty-fifth, 2024, when she ranked twenty-sixth, and 2025, where she ranked twenty-fifth. She was named one of the top leaders in the middle east by Communicate Middle East in 2021 and one of the most creative people in the Middle East by Fast Company Middle East.
