= Mai Badr =

British journalist

- Born: 6 July 1968 (age 56); Birmingham, UK
- Citizenship: Syria and United Kingdom
- Occupation: Editor-in-chief of Hia Magazine
- Spouse: Adnan Alkateb (m. 1994)
- Website: Hiamag.com

Mai Badr (born 6 July 1968) is the editor-in-chief of Hia magazine. Born in Birmingham, UK, she is of Syrian origin and is considered one of the most prominent Arab women journalists. She spent her childhood and completed her education in Lattakia on the Syrian coast and is married to journalist Adnan Alkateb with whom she has one son, Badr.

== Career ==
- In 1993, Mai worked as an editor in the Arab Press House in London, particularly in the political magazine Al Majalla.
- She has worked as editor and editorial director at Hia magazine (published by the same company) since 1995.
- In 2004, she was appointed editor-in-chief of Hia magazine, a position she still holds.
- She was appointed in early 2013 deputy editor-in-chief of both Sayidaty and Al Jamila magazines.

== Work and success ==
Mai Badr has managed to establish strong relations with elite women, wives of leaders, princesses, dignitaries, business women, and members of the high society. She succeeded, despite fierce competition in world of media and journalism, in transforming Hia magazine into the most famous and most sophisticated Arab women's magazine. Today, the world's most important "maisons" and companies compete to advertise in Hia, and famous Arab women from various fields dream of being featured in its issues.

== Family and origins ==
She comes from two well-established families on the coast of Syria. Her maternal grandfather the late Sheikh Ali Chehab Nasser was a member of the first Syrian parliament after independence. On her father's side, her grandfather Sheikh Maarouf Badr was among the most eminent local personalities in the Lattakia area.

== Personal life and interests ==
Apart from work, Mai Badr focuses her care and attention on her only child Badr, who is Born in 2003, and she spends with him most of her time. Her favorite hobby is reading, especially novels and autobiographies of the greats, philosophers, and leaders.

== Awards and recognition ==
She has been honored by several institutions as well as humanitarian and charitable organizations, such as:

- Emirates Women Award
- UNICEF
- Princess Adila bint Abdullah bin Abdulaziz, president of Sanad Children's Cancer Support Society

== Interviews with Arab and international celebrities ==
Mai Badr has conducted significant interviews with the Arab region's and the world's most famous women, including:

- Al Jawhara Al Ibrahim
- Adila Abdullah bin Abdulaziz
- Suzanne Mubarak
- Rania Al Abdullah
- Nazik Hariri
- Manal bint Mohammed bin Rashid Al Maktoum
