= Adel Al Toraifi =

Saudi Arabian journalist (born 1979)

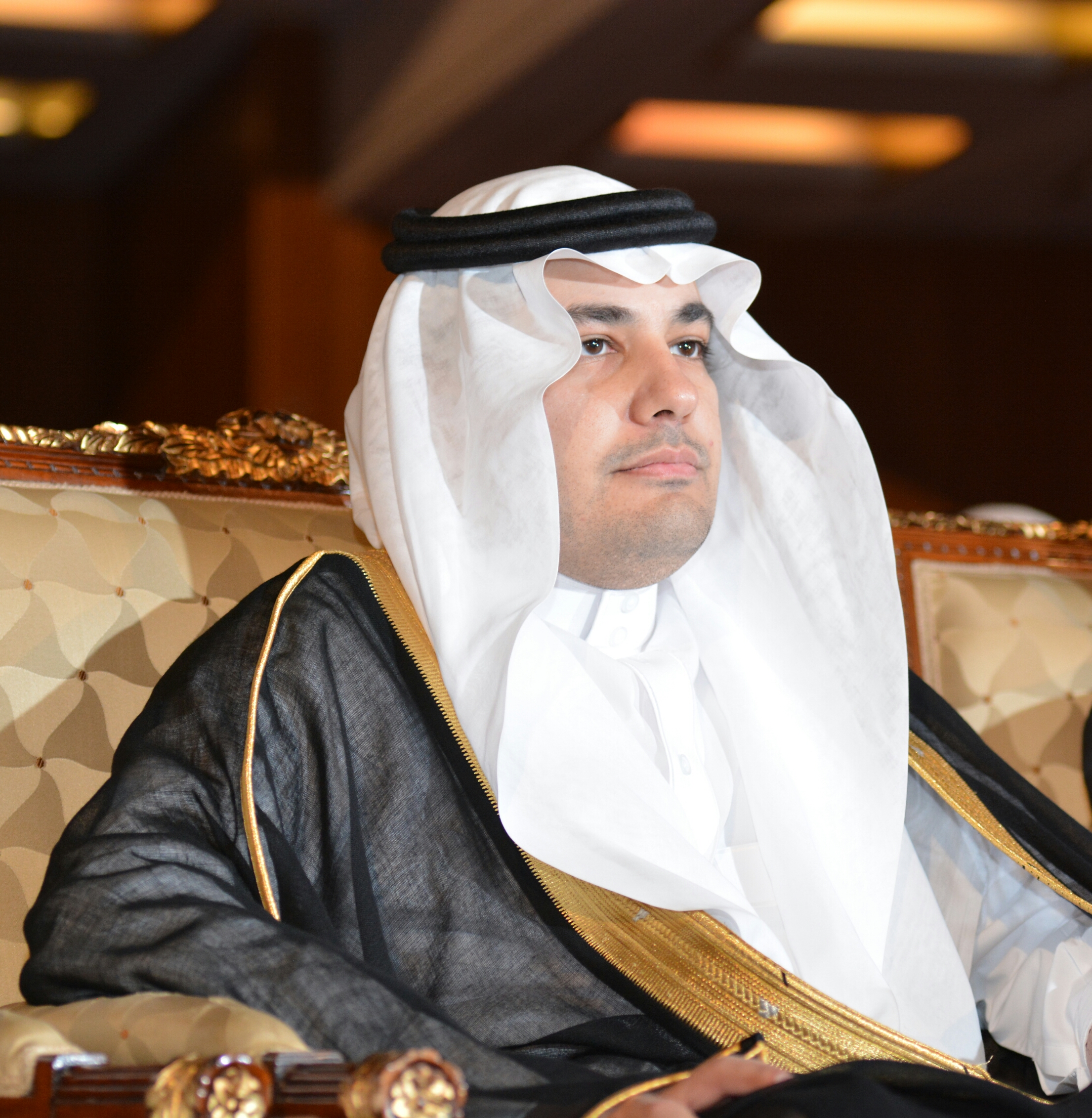

Minister of Information and Culture
- In office 29 January 2015 – 22 April 2017
- Prime Minister: Salman bin Abdulaziz Al Saud
- Succeeded by: Awwad Alawwad

Personal details
- Born: 1979 (age 46–47)
- Education: Kingston University; London School of Economics

Adel Al Toraifi (Arabic: عادل الطريفي; born 1979) is a Saudi journalist and a specialist in Middle Eastern affairs, focusing on Saudi-Iranian relations and foreign policy decision making in the Arab states of the Persian Gulf. He was the minister of culture and information of Saudi Arabia from January 2015 to April 2017.

== Early life and education ==
Al Toraifi was born in 1979. He received a master's degree in international conflict in 2008 from Kingston University, London. He finished his PhD studies in international relations at the London School of Economics and Political Science in 2012. The title of his thesis is "Understanding the role of state identity in foreign policy decision-making: the rise of Saudi-Iranian rapprochement (1997-2009)".

== Career ==
Al Toraifi began his journalism career at the beginning of the 2000s as an opinion writer and commentator for many Arabic and foreign newspapers. He published weekly political opinions in Al Riyadh newspaper. He also wrote for Al Watan in 2003. Then he began to write weekly for the opinion pages of Asharq Al-Awsat. In 2010, he became editor-in-chief of The Majalla. In addition to this post, he began to serve as the deputy editor-in-chief for Asharq Al-Awsat in July 2012.

Al Toraifi was named as the chief editor of Asharq Al-Awsat on 11 December 2012 with effect from 1 January 2013, replacing Tariq Alhomayed in the post. He also held his post as editor-in-chief of The Majalla.

One of his main achievements as the editor-in-chief of The Majalla was the launching of the digital version of the magazine in Arabic, English and Persian. On 1 July 2014 he left the post of editor in chief of Asharq Al-Awsat.

Al Toraifi then joined the Al Arabiya television news channel as deputy general manager. On 22 November 2014, he was appointed general manager of Al Arabiya News Channel, replacing Abdulrahman Al Rashed in the post.

On 29 January 2015 Al Toraifi was appointed minister of culture and information of Saudi Arabia. His term ended on 22 April 2017 when Awwad Alawwad was named as the minister of culture and information.
