= Rubei =

Rubei is both an Italian surname and a romanization of the Arabic surname al-Rubʿī (الربعي). It may refer to the following people:

- Ahmed al-Rubei (1949–2008), Kuwaiti politician, journalist and professor;
- Andrea Rubei (born 1966), Italian futsal player;
- Augusto Rubei (born 1985), Italian journalist.
