= Al-Harthi =

Al-Harthi, Alharthi, Al-Harthy, Alharthy, Al-Harithi, or other variants (Arabic: الحارثي, romanized: al-Ḥārithī), is an Arabic surname. Notable people with the surname include:

- Abdulrahman Al-Harthi (born 1998), Saudi footballer
- Barakat Al-Harthi (born 1988), Omani sprinter
- Abushiri ibn Salim al-Harthi (c. 1840 – 1889), Omani revolutionary
- Ahmad Al Harthy (born 1981), Omani racing driver
- Amjad Al-Harthi (born 1994), Omani footballer
- Hammoudi Al-Harithi (1936–2024), Iraqi actor, sculptor, writer and director
- Hamoud bin Abdullah al-Harthi (1940–2004), Omani politician
- Hossam Al-Harthi (born 1992), Saudi footballer
- Jokha Alharthi (born 1978), an Omani writer and academic
- Mohammed Al-Harthi (born 1994), Saudi footballer
- Mohammed Fahad Al-Harthi, Saudi writer, journalist and media expert
- Mohsin al-Harthi (born 1976), Saudi footballer
- Muhammad Harithi (1962–2018), Omani poet and writer
- Nadhira Al Harthy (1977–2026), Omani civil servant and mountaineer
- Nawaf Al-Harthi (born 1998), Saudi footballer
- Rabi ibn Ziyad al-Harithi, Rashidun and Umayyad military leader
- Qaed Salim Sinan al-Harethi (1955–2002), Yemeni al-Qaeda operative
- Saad Al-Harthi (born 1984), Saudi footballer
- Thabit ibn Qays al-Harithi al-Khazraji, companion of Muhammad
- Ziyad ibn Ubayd Allah al-Harithi, Abbasid governor of Medina and Mecca 750–758

== See also ==
- El Harti Stadium, Marrakesh, Morocco
- Banu al-Harith, Arabian tribe which governed Najran, Taif and Al-Harith
