= Al Majalla =

News magazine (1980-)

- Editor-in-chief: Ibrahim Hamidi
- Categories: Online news magazine
- Frequency: Weekly
- Circulation: 86.961 (2009)
- Publisher: Saudi Research Publishing Company
- Founded: 1980
- Final issue: April 2009 (print)
- Company: Saudi Research and Marketing Group (SRMG)
- Country: United Kingdom, Saudi Arabia
- Language: Arabic, English and Persian
- Website: Al Majalla
- ISSN: 0261-0876

Al Majalla (Arabic:المجلة, "the magazine"), formerly The Majalla, is a Saudi-owned, London-based political news journal published in Arabic, English and Persian. The magazine's headquarters in Saudi Arabia are located in Jeddah.

From 1980 to 2009 a print edition was issued weekly, every Sunday. In April 2009 the magazine moved to an all-online format. The online version continues to be published weekly.

== History and profile ==
The Majalla was launched by Hisham Hafiz in London in 1980. The magazine is owned by Saudi Research and Marketing Group (SRMG), and was reestablished in 1987 by Ahmed bin Salman, then chairman of the SRMG. The former chairman of the SRMG is Turki bin Salman Al Saud.

The SRMG owns many other newspapers such as Arab News, Al Eqtisadiah, Urdu News and Asharq Al Awsat and magazines, including Sayidaty, Al Jamila, Arrajol, Bassim and Heya.

Al Majalla, along with Sayidaty and Al Yamamah, is among popular magazines in Saudi Arabia.

=== Editors ===
Abdul Karim Abou-Nasr was the first editor-in-chief of the magazine. He created the concept and managed it from April 1, 1979 to October 22, 1983. The first issue was published on February 16, 1980. During this period, Elias Mansour was the managing editor and Gaby G. Tabarani was the secretary of the editorial staff. From 1983 to 1987 the editor-in-chief of the magazine was Othman Al Omeir who owns news portal Elaph. Then Abdel Rahman Al Rashid served as the editor-in-chief of the magazine from 1987 to 1998. Adel Al Toraifi was appointed editor-in-chief of The Majalla in 2010. In July 2012, he was also named deputy editor-in-chief of Asharq Al Awsat, a daily newspaper published by SRMG. Toraifi's term as the editor-in-chief of the magazine ended in July 2014 when Salman bin Yousuf Al Dossary was appointed to the post. His term ended in 2016 when Ghassan Charbel was appointed to the post. The current editor-in-chief is the Syrian journalist Ibrahim Hamidi.

Al Majalla offers the readers an overview of the main weekly news, analysis and exclusive reports with a focus on political affairs. The magazine also provides news from USA Today, Time Magazine, World Monitor and MEED.

Because of its close connection with the Arab world, Al Majalla has often broken stories from sources close to militant groups like the PLO, Hamas, and Al-Qaeda. It also publishes articles written by senior Saudi princes like Prince Turki Al Faisal.

The magazine is also well known for its political cartoons, particularly those by the late Mahmoud Kahil. These were often critical of Israel and the United States. The Majalla sponsored London's first Festival for Arab Caricature in 1989.

=== Circulation ===
In 1994 The Majalla sold 116,000 copies. The audited circulation of the magazine at the end of the 1990s is stated to be just under 100,000 copies. Its 2009 circulation was 86,961 copies.
