= Mishkan Al-Awar =

Meshgan Mohammed Al-Awar مشكان العور (1968 - July 2020, ~52 yrs. old) was a renowned Emirati chemical researcher. She was the first Emirati woman to specialize in chemistry and the first to work as a chemistry teacher. She contributed to the development of the unified chemistry curriculum across the countries of the Gulf Cooperation Council (GCC) countries.

UNESCO selected her as co-chair for social responsibility on the International Advisory Council for Sustainability Development in the UNESCO office in Hong Kong. She was the first Emirati and the first Arab woman to hold such a position at this level within the organization.

== Biography ==
Al-Awar was born in Dubai, into an academic family. She earned a Bachelor of Science in Geology and Chemistry from the United Arab Emirates University in 1990, and a PhD in Polymer Science (Physical Chemistry) from the University of Wales in the United Kingdom in 1996.

She was director of research and remote sensing studies at the Dubai Police Academy between 2012 and 2020, and head of the Women's Police Department for Community Service in Dubai. She was also a visiting professor at the Remote Sensing Research Center at Boston University.

The last positions Dr. Mashkan Al-Awar held were Secretary-General of the Zayed International Foundation for the Environment, and Advisor for the Academic and Training Sector at Dubai Police.

Al-Awar died on 26 July 2020. She was married and had four children.

== Research and memberships ==
In 2005, she represented the United Arab Emirates in the Arab Women in Science and Technology Network. She was also selected as a Middle East regional expert to contribute to scenario development for the United Nations Environment Programme’s Fourth Global Environment Outlook (GEO-4) report. She previously served as the head of the Environmental Research and Studies Center at the Zayed International Prize for the Environment.She was a member of the Environmental Committee of the Hamid Bin Rashid Al Nuaimi Foundation for Development and Human Advancement in Ajman. Additionally, she served on the Scientific Committee of the Dubai International Conference on Desertification, as well as the Dubai International Conference on Water Resources Management in the Third Millennium (2002).

== Awards ==
She won several awards, including:

- In 1999, she won the Distinguished Government Performance Award in the “Distinguished Government Employee” category.
- Winner of Sayidaty Award for Creativity and Excellence in Science and Medicine.
- Distinguished Woman Award at the 3rd Middle East Community Service Awards.
- UNESCO Hong Kong awarded Al-Awar the "Women Leaders in Community Service" award in 2018, for her contributions to achieving the United Nations 2030 Agenda for Sustainable Development Goals.
