= Al Jamila =

Women's magazine

- March 2012 cover of Al Jamila
- Editor-in-chief: Mohammed Fahad Al Harthi
- Categories: Women's magazine
- Frequency: Monthly
- Publisher: Saudi Research and Publishing Company
- First issue: 1 October 1994; 31 years ago
- Company: Saudi Research and Marketing Group
- Country: Saudi Arabia
- Language: Arabic

Al Jamila is an Arabic monthly women's magazine, published in Dubai. It is one of the publications of the Saudi Research and Marketing Group.

== History and ownership ==
Al Jamila was firstly launched in London and then, in Riyadh in October 1994. The magazine was relocated from London to Dubai in 2005.

It is one of the magazines published by Saudi Research and Publishing Company, a subsidiary of Saudi Research and Marketing Group. The company also owns other magazines such as Sayidaty, The Majalla, Urdu Magazine and Hia as well as newspapers such as Arab News, Al Eqtisadiah, Urdu News and Asharq al Awsat.

As of 2013 Mohammed Fahad Al Harthi was the editor-in-chief of the magazine, who had been in this post since 2004. He is also editor-in-chief of Sayidaty.

== Content ==
Al Jamila mainly involves news on beauty and health, and offers its readers in-depth articles about the latest make-up looks, beauty products and treatments as well as news on health and fitness.

== Readership ==
It was reported by Al Khaleejiah in 2011 that Al Jamila is read 89.7% by females and 10.3% by males. It was further indicated that female readers of the magazine are those between 18 and 29 years old. Therefore, the target audience of the magazine is teenagers and young adult women in Saudi Arabia and other Arab countries.

== See also ==
- List of magazines in Saudi Arabia
