= Lina Mo =

Saudi Arabian fashion photographer and cover artist

- لينا مو
- Born: Lina Mohammad Al-Faqeer; May 12, 1987 (age 38); Jeddah, Saudi Arabia
- Education: B.E. - Software engineering
- Alma mater: King Abdulaziz University; Sana'a University
- Known for: Fashion photography Street photography
- Style: Contemporary; Avant-garde
- Website: Official website

Lina Mohammad (Arabic: لينا محمد) (born May 12, 1987), professionally known as Lina Mo (Arabic: لينا مو), is a Saudi Arabian fashion photographer and cover artist. Her art style portrays combination of Saudi culture with experimental modern art. She has exhibited and published internationally. Her works have appeared on the covers and featured in the various international publications including Elle, Harper's Bazaar, Destination, etc. She is based in Jeddah, Saudi Arabia.

== Biography ==
Lina was born and brought up in Jeddah, Saudi Arabia. She completed her early education from Jeddah Public Schools. She attended Sana'a University where she received her graduate degree in software engineering in 2009. Later, Lina attended King Abdulaziz University where she received her second graduate degree in administrative science in 2016.

Before 2010, Lina started amateur travel photography with a compact camera and began to learn photography principles herself. Later in 2010, she participated and won the photography contest organized by Apple Inc. in Saudi Arabia. Her photo, titled Illusion was exhibited throughout the nation alongside other selected photographs.

In 2016, Lina started her professional career as a street and fashion photographer. From that point forward, Lina’s commercial and professional work included frequent covers and spreads for Elle, Harper's Bazaar, Destination, Grazia, Marie Claire, Vice, etc. Over the years, Lina has collaborated and shot portraits for various international and national celebrities. Her celebrity portraits includes Marshmello, Mariah Carey, Mohammed Abdu, Rabeh Sager, Sherine, Marriam Mossalli, Faisal Al-Ghazzawi, Amy Roko and others.

In 2020, Lina shot the cover of Saudi Arabia's first-ever street-style book Under The Abaya by Marriam Mossalli. As per Harper's Bazaar, the book succeeded in shattering stereotypes and demystifying the way the world views women from the Kingdom of Saudi Arabia.
