= Haider Galib =

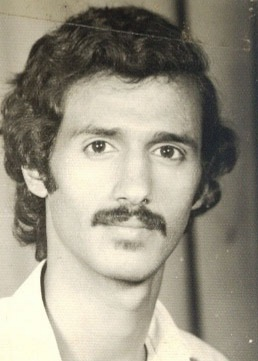
- Born: Haider Galib Hasan; 1 January 1958; Taiz of Yemen
- Died: 1 January 1983 (aged 25); Italy
- Known for: Painting
- Movement: Surrealism

Haidar Ghaleb (1958–1983) was a Yemeni plastic artist born in the village of Akaba, 'Uzlah of al-Aroq, Taiz Governorate. He was one of the pioneers of plastic art in Yemen.

== Biography ==
His artistic career began with painting in watercolor at Al Tayyar Model School and making clay facial sculptures of fellow villagers, including his father, grandmother, grandfather, and some of the elderly in his village. He then began sculpting faces on stones from a nearby river, some of which belonged to Gamal Abdel Nasser, among others.

After completing his primary education in the village, he moved to Sana'a to continue his studies. He studied architecture at the Chinese Art School. He graduated earning a technical high school degree with honors in 1978. He fulfilled his national service, and then worked as a draftsman at the ministry. He was then employed at the Yemen Oil and Gas Corporation in 1981.

== Works ==
All of Haider Galib's paintings depict cultural concerns of Yemen. The issues bear the present and future of Yemen. His painting of a coffee tree addressed the problem of neglecting coffee cultivation and the consequent economic loss to Yemen. His painting of a Khat tree, a popular tree in Yemen that contains a caffeine-like stimulant, addressed the problem of Khat and the damage it causes to the Yemeni people, their land, and their future. His paintings had meaningful messages, such as the panel (The collapse of the Marb dam), Temple of the Sun, The Plate (Malicious Hand), Civilization, Thama Peasant, & Harvest Season in Tihamah. The painting “Earth and Man” represents the unification of man and the Earth, and presents his suffering therein.

== Career ==
Haidar Ghalib participated in all plastic exhibitions held in Yemen and abroad. This included an exhibition at Sana'a University where he showed a sculpture of half a woman. He participated in the 7th Kuwait Exhibition of Arab plastic artists. He also participated in an exhibition held in Qatar, as well as in an exhibition held in Saudi Arabia within the Yemeni cultural week held during his time there. In 1980, the Ministry of Information and Culture held an exhibition of Yemeni artists in Dar al-Kutub, or the Egyptian National Library, in Cairo, Egypt. His paintings surprised those who saw them, especially the Prime Minister Wu and the Minister of Culture, prompting them to direct the competent authorities to provide him with a grant to study plastic arts in Italy. He traveled to Italy the same year. While in Italy, he got diagnosed with hemolysis, which doctors in Yemen mistook for malaria and treated it as such. By the time doctors in Italy started the treatment, the disease had already progressed too far. Ghalib died in Italy in 1983.

== Awards ==
- He received a certificate of appreciation and the second shield from Sana'a University 1977.
- Certificate of Appreciation from the Kuwaiti Society for Fine Arts 1 April 1981.

== Bibliography ==
- Al-Faisal magazine, No. 69 in 1983, follow-up and analysis of the Yemeni plastic exhibition, which was held in that period in Saudi Arabia, and the painting was Haider Ghaleb in front of pages.
- The New Yemeni Literary Magazine, Issue 7, Sixteenth Year, July 1987. The front cover of the magazine is a painting (Earth and Man).
- New Yemeni Literary Magazine, Tenth Issue, Sixteenth Year, October 1987. The back feed of the magazine and the inner cover, (Biography of the artist Haider Ghalib).
- Al-Thawra Official Newspaper, 28 September 1980. An article about the painting (coffee tree).
- Al-Thawra Newspaper, 20 October 1980, interview with plastic artist Haider Ghalib.
