= Al Aziziah (Riyadh) =

Neighborhood in Riyadh, Saudi Arabia

Al-Aziziyah حي العزيزية
- Neighbourhood
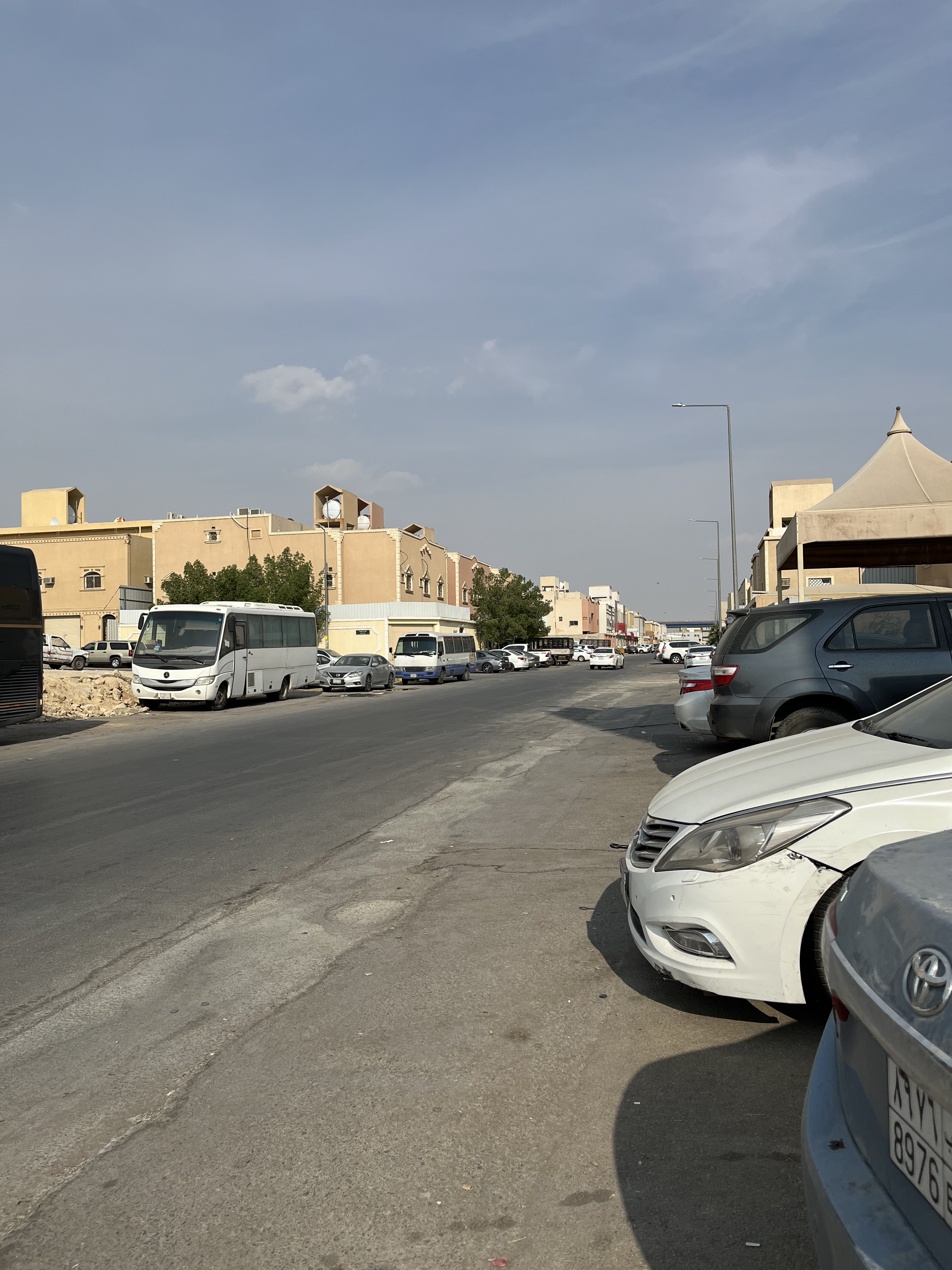
- Al Aziziyah, 2023
- Interactive map of Al-Aziziyah
- Coordinates: 24°35′8″N 46°46′23″E
- Country: Saudi Arabia
- City: Riyadh
- Named for: Abdulaziz ibn Saud

Government
  - Body: Baladiyah Al Aziziya

Language
  - Official: Arabic

Al-Aziziah (Arabic: العزيزية, romanized: al-ʿAzīzīyyah) is a residential neighborhood in southern Riyadh, Saudi Arabia and the seat of the eponymous sub-municipality, al-Aziziya. Covering an area of 500 acres, it was established in the 1960s by Saudi businessman Saleh bin Abdul Wahab al-Sanea, who later named the neighborhood after King Abdulaziz ibn Saud. The neighbor

== Pollution ==
In 2013, Okaz reported that al-Aziziyah district is facing all kinds of pollution from three directions, the cement factory, slaughterhouses and sewages and was dubbed as the "nest of nests" of environmental pollution.

== Traffic and transportation ==
According to Al Riyadh in 2013, residents in al-Aziziyah complained of regular traffic congestion due to overcrowding of trucks and other cargo vehicles.

It hosts the Al Aziziyah bus stop, which was established around 2001.
