= Fahda bint Falah Al Hithlain =

Third wife of King Salman of Saudi Arabia

- Born: 1955 (age 70–71)
- Spouse: Salman of Saudi Arabia (m. 1984)
- Issue: List: Crown Prince Mohammed; Prince Khalid; Prince Turki; Prince Nayef; Prince Bandar; Prince Rakan
Names
- Fahda bint Falah bin Hithlain Alajmi
- House: Al Saud (by marriage)
- Father: Falah bin Sultan Al Hithlain
- Mother: Munira bint Abdullah

Princess Fahda bint Falah Al Hithlain Alajmi (Arabic: فهدة بنت فلاح آل حثلين العجمي) is the third spouse of Salman bin Abdulaziz Al Saud, the King of Saudi Arabia. She is a member of the Al-Ajman tribe. Her mother is Munira bint Abdullah and her ancestors include Al-Ajman tribe leaders, Rakan and Dhaydan bin Hithlain.

Fahda married King Salman in 1984. She has six children with King Salman: Crown Prince and Prime Minister Mohammed, Prince Turki, Defense Minister Prince Khalid, Prince Nayef, Prince Bandar and Prince Rakan. Her second eldest son, Turki, is a businessman. Prince Khalid, her third eldest son, is the Minister of Defense. Prince Bandar is the head of Royal Guard which deals with personal security of the King and Crown Prince.

In 2017, US intelligence officials alleged that Fahda was placed under house arrest by her son, Crown Prince Bin Salman, under the auspices of the Crown Prince's anti-corruption purge. The purported arrest happened without the knowledge of King Salman, who was misled into thinking that his wife was receiving medical treatment. Saudi officials deny the US's allegations.
