= Dana Al Khalifa =

Bahraini blogger and member of the Bahraini royal family

- Born: Kingdom of Bahrain
- Spouse: Suliman Azzouni
- Issue: Alia Azzouni
- House: Khalifa
- Occupation: lawyer, fashion blogger

Sheikha Dana Al Khalifa (Arabic: دانة آل خليفة) is a Bahraini fashion blogger, businesswoman, lawyer, and member of Bahraini royal family.

== Early life and education ==
Dana was born and raised in the Kingdom of Bahrain as a member of the royal family. She received a bachelor of law degree from the University of London's School of Oriental and African Studies. She later obtained a master's degree in law from King's College London.

== Career ==
While at law school in London, Sheika Dana was exposed to European fashion. After searching for a job in fashion after her move back to Bahrain, she founded the style blog The Overdressed in December 2009. She was named Harper's Bazaar Arabia's Best Dressed in the magazine's first issue. In 2011 she hosted her first pop-up event for an international retailer in Bahrain. In 2014 Princess Dana hosted her first event for London-based retailer Avenue 32. In 2014 she established The Overdressed Pavilion, which hosted seven international jewelers at Jewelry Arabia. Later in 2014 she was the first Arab blogger to be selected by Louis Vuitton to attend their 2015 Spring Season show in Paris, later becoming the first Arab ambassador for the brand. In January 2015 she was the first Arab blogger to be on the cover of Hia Magazine.

In September 2018, Dana walked in the Spring/Summer 2019 Dolce & Gabbana show in Milan.

== Personal life ==
Sheika Dana is married to Suliman Azzouni and has one daughter, Alia.
