= Al Arabiya English =

Riyadh based newscaster

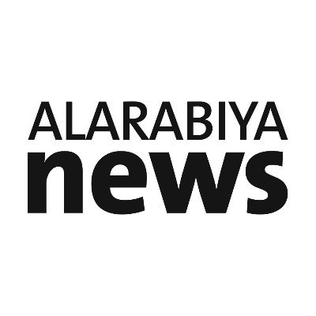
- Website type: Online newspaper
- Available in: English
- Owner: MBC Group
- Editor: Mamdouh Almuhaini
- Parent: Al Arabiya Network
- Website: english.alarabiya.net
- Commercial: Yes
- Registration: No
- Current status: Online
- Written in: English

Al Arabiya English is an English language service of the Saudi state-owned Al Arabiya News Channel.

== Foundation and early days ==
Former logo, used until early February 2021.

Al-Arabiya English was launched in 2007. The website carried wire news and selected translated articles from Al Arabiya's main Arabic language news site.

In November 2013, the site was relaunched with a new design that provided captioned and searchable news clips from the main Al Arabiya news channel.

== Staffing ==
The Al Arabiya English website began under the same editorial management as the channel's Arabic website.

In July 2012, Faisal J. Abbas, a Huffington Post blogger, Middle East correspondent and former media editor of London-based daily Asharq Al-Awsat, was appointed editor-in-chief of the Al Arabiya English Service. He held the role until 2016.

In 2019, Mohammed Al Yahya assumed the role of editor-in-chief. Al Yahya oversaw a comprehensive restructuring of the operation and a revamp of its website.

A number of editors were brought in to manage the service independently, including American journalist Courtney Radsch and Pranay Gupte, from 2011 from 2012.

In September 2017, Saudi columnist Mamdouh Almuhaini was appointed as editor-in-chief of all of Al Arabiya's digital platforms, which include the English, Arabic, Urdu and Persion websites. In 2019, he was appointed general manager of Al Arabiya Network.

In 2024, Al Arabiya contracted Riz Khan as a host, who formerly hosted for BBC and CNN.

== Criticism ==
In 2012, Al Arabiya English published a series of stories discussing a number of leaked emails belonging to Sherri Jaafari, the daughter of Syria's UN envoy Bashar Jaafari. The leaked emails showed Sherri requesting an internship with US television host Charlie Rose in exchange for securing an interview with President Assad. Al Arabiya English's stories were carried by a number of US media outlets, including the New York Post and The Huffington Post.

Following an op-ed published in March 2015 calling for President Barack Obama to "listen to [Israeli PM] Netanyahu" regarding the Iranian nuclear deal, a number of global media outlets criticized Al Arabiya English's editorial stance. Based on this op-ed, the London Independent journalist Robert Fisk wrote that the column, which was written by Al Arabiya English's editor-in-chief at the time, would not have been published unless it was blessed by the Saudi monarchy.
