= Sayidaty =

Arabic language women's magazine

- Editor-in-chief: Lama Alshethry
- Categories: Women's magazine
- Frequency: Weekly
- Circulation: 143.351 (2009)
- Publisher: Saudi Research and Publishing Company
- First issue: 1 March 1981; 45 years ago
- Company: Saudi Research and Media Group
- Country: Saudi Arabia
- Language: Arabic and English
- Website: www.sayidaty.net

Sayidaty (Arabic سيدتي Sayyidatī, meaning My Lady in English) is a weekly Arabic and a monthly English women's magazine published in both Riyadh and Beirut and distributed throughout the Middle East, North Africa, Europe and America.

== History ==
Sayidaty was founded by Hisham Hafiz and his brother Muhammed Hafiz in London. Later, it was started in Riyadh in March 1981. The magazine was relocated from London to Riyadh in 2005. The English edition was launched in 2007.

Hala Al Nasser, who is current editor-in-chief of Rotana Magazine, is one of the magazine's former editors. As of 2013 Mohammed Fahad Al-Harthi was the editor-in-chief of the magazine who was appointed to the post in 2004. As of 2010 Lebanese journalist Hadia Said was the cultural editor of the magazine.

End of 2020 Lama Alshethri was the editor-in-chief of the magazine.

== Ownership ==
Sayidaty is one of the magazines published by Saudi Research and Publishing Company, a subsidiary of Saudi Research and Marketing Group (SRMG). SRMG also owns other magazines such as Al Jamila, The Majalla, Bassim, Urdu Magazine and Hia as well as newspapers such as Arab News, Al Eqtisadiah, Urdu News and Asharq Al-Awsat.

== Contents ==
Sayidaty, the first and only Pan Arab women weekly, provides professional and quality reading, making it the most powerful advertising vehicle among women's magazines in Saudi Arabia and the Persian Gulf region. The magazine mostly covers a wide range of topics favoured by the modern Arab women, from beauty and fashion to social and family life.

In June 2013 it was expanded to cover two new sections: one on human behavior, and another for teenagers and college students.

== Target readership and circulation ==
The magazine is said to target primarily families, focusing on conscious housewives. Sayidaty, along with Al Yamamah and The Majalla, is among popular magazines in Saudi Arabia.

The circulation of the magazine at the end of the 1990s was 140,000 copies per issue. In April 2014, its online version received 39 million hits according to the reports by the editor-in-chief.

== See also ==
- List of magazines in Saudi Arabia
