= Hamad Al-Jassir =

Saudi Arabian journalist and historian

Hamad al Jassir
- Born: 1907; Al Burood, Saudi Arabia
- Died: 14 September 2000 (aged 92–93)
- Occupations: Teacher, journalist and historian
- Known for: founding Saudi Arabia's first central region magazine
- Awards: King Faisal Prize (1996)

Hamad Al Jassir (1907 – 14 September 2000) was a prominent Saudi Arabian journalist and historian. He is particularly noted for founding Saudi Arabia's first central region magazine, with comprehensive geographical locations, reference in Saudi Arabia, and the authorship of a comprehensive genealogical work popular in the country.

== Early life ==
Hamad al Jasser was born in the small village of Al Burood in 1907. He grew up physically weak, not learning how to walk until the age of four, and his mother died when he was just seven years old. He learned how to read and write by attending the village school, Al Kuttab.

In 1920, his father sent him to live with a relative who was studying in the capital, Riyadh. There, in line with normal educational practice in the country at the time, he memorised the whole of the Quran, and learned about the lives of the Sheikhs.

After the relative he was living with in Riyadh died, he returned to his hometown Al Burood. At this point his father had fallen ill, and so his grandfather put him in charge of educating the young people of Al Burood. However, his older brother, Jasser Al Jasser, was unhappy with his presence in Al Burood and took him back to Riyadh, to continue his education among other students and Sheikhs.

== Career ==
Al Jasser became a teacher and taught throughout Saudi Arabia. He also served as a judge in Northern Hejaz. He went on to establish the first magazine, Al Yamamah in 1953 in Riyadh. Additionally, he was very much involved in the magazine and journalism in general.

He wrote many geographical/historical books, all specialized in the Arabian Peninsula. Al Jasser's famous genealogical work Kitab Al Ansab ("The Book of Roots") that lists all Saudi families together with a brief history of the family. As a result, the book is very popular and read widely throughout Saudi Arabia.

He also established a second magazine, Al Arab, and a publishing house "Dar Al Yamama for Research, Publishing and Distribution", which he supervised.

== Works ==
The most known works of Hamad Al Jassir are as follows:

- Abu Ali Al Hajari; The Effect of Pilgrimage on spreading culture
- Imam Abu Is'hac Al Harbi and his book on Pilgrimage
- Al Barq Al Yamani Fiu Al Fat'h Al Othmani
- Bilad Al Arab–Al Hassan Al Asfahani
- Yebu'
- Jamharat Ansab Al Osar in Najd
- Al Durar Al Munadhama fi Akhbar Al Hajj
- The Geographic dictionary of North KSA
- The Geographic dictionary of KSA towns, villages and desert resources
- Al Shoyoukh Dictionary
- KSA Tribes Dictionary
- Excerpts from Al Ayashi voyage
- A summary of the two trips of Qbdul Salam Al Derei Al Maghrebi
- News of Hijaz and Najd in Al Jabarti History

He has also written a book on Egyptian Hajj route compiling works of historians like AlJazeeri on route from Cairo to Makkah.

== Honors ==
Hamad Al Jassir is the recipient of the 1996 King Faisal Prize for Arabic Language and Literature.
