= List of magazines in Saudi Arabia =

In the 1990s there were about twenty-five magazines and periodicals in Saudi Arabia. Editions of some international magazines, including Marie Claire and Madame Figaro, are also published in the country. The Arabic edition of Madame Figaro was started in 2009.

The following is an incomplete list of current and defunct magazines published in the country. They are published in Arabic or other languages.

== A ==
- Ain al-Yaqeen
- Al Arab
- Al Jamila
- Al Yamamah
- Arrajol

== D ==
- Destination
- DQ Living Magazine

== H ==
- Hia

== L ==
- Lean Magazine
- Lucire KSA

== N ==
- Nature Arabic Edition

== R ==
- Rotana Magazine

== S ==
- Sayidaty

== W ==
- Women of Saudi Arabia

== See also ==
- Media of Saudi Arabia
- List of newspapers in Saudi Arabia
