= Adnan AlKateb =

British journalist of Syrian origin

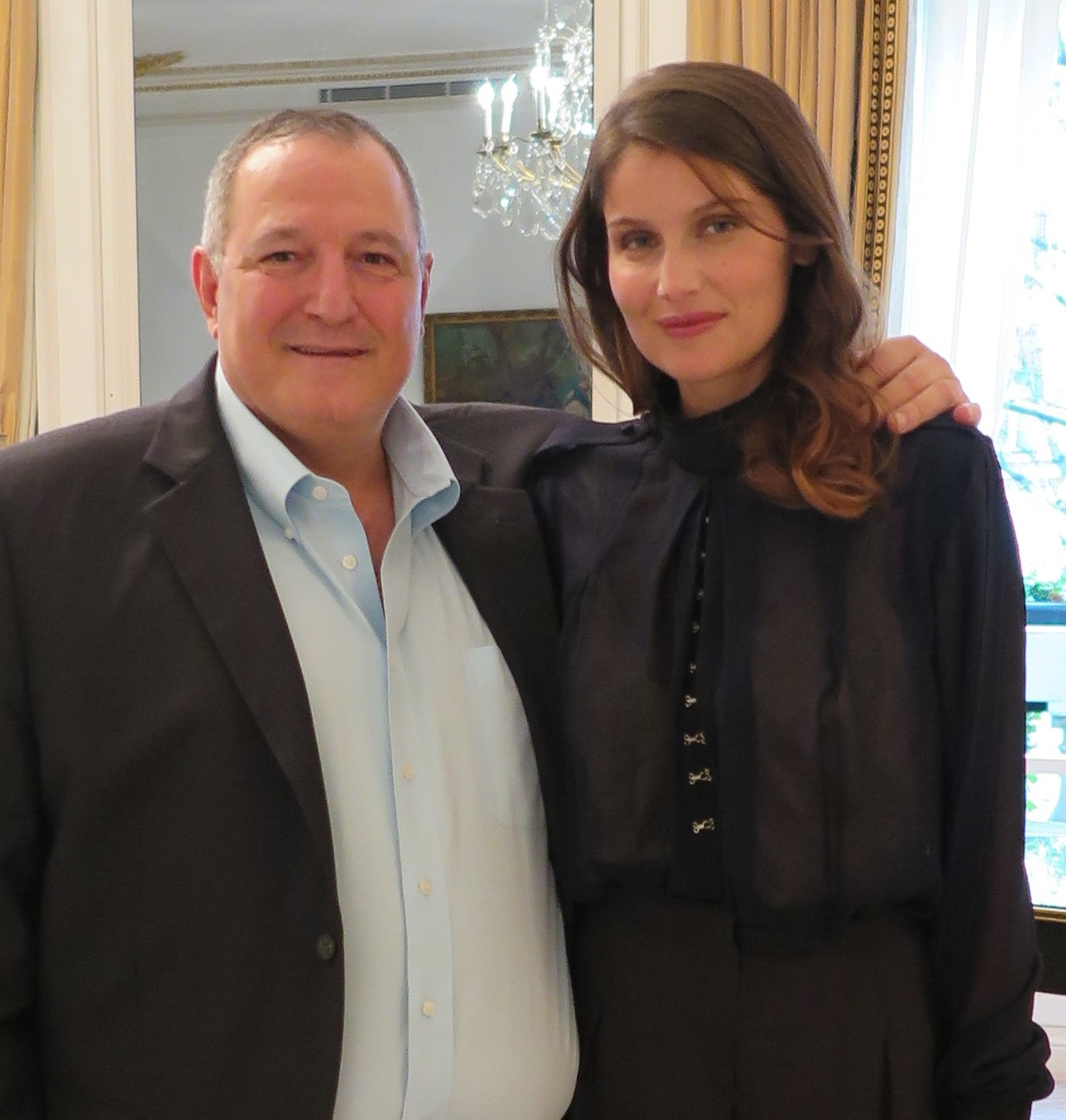
- Born: 8 March 1958 (age 68); Latakia, Syria
- Citizenship: Syria and United Kingdom
- Occupation: Editorial Manager of Hia Magazine
- Spouse: Mai Badr (m. 1994)
- Website: Hiamag.com

Adnan Alkateb (عدنان الكاتب; born in 1958 in Latakia), is a British journalist of Syrian origin. He is the editorial manager of Hia Magazine in Dubai. He is well known as a celebrity interviewer.

== Career ==
From 1982 to 1994, Alkateb worked as the editor for various Syrian newspapers. From 1994 to 2006 he was the editor at the Arab Press House in London, and editorial manager of Sayidati magazine. Since 2006 he has been the editorial manager of Hia magazine.

Alkateb has conducted interviews with many international celebrities, including Monica Bellucci, Julia Roberts, Gisele Bundchen, Blake Lively, Jennifer Lopez, Amy Adams, Beyonce, Emilia Clarke, Lady Kitty Spencer, Bella Hadid, and Emily Ratajkowski.
