= Tariq Alhomayed =

Saudi journalist

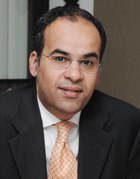
- Tariq Alhomayed
- Occupation: Editor-in-Chief
- Known for: Asharq Alawsat

Tariq Alhomayed is a journalist and former Editor-in-Chief of the Arabic-language newspaper Asharq Alawsat, the youngest person to be appointed that position. a host of Almooqf TV show on the Saudi TV. Alhomyed has been a guest analyst and commentator on numerous news and current affair programs including the BBC, German TV, Al Arabiya, Al-Hurra, LBC and Imad Live's four-part series on terrorism and reformation in Saudi Arabia.

== Education ==
Alhomayed received a Bachelor of Arts degree in media studies from King Abdul Aziz University in Jeddah.

== Career ==
Alhomayed began his journalism career as a correspondent for Al Madina newspaper in Washington D.C. from 1998 to August 2000. He served as the Managing Editor of Asharq Alawsat in Saudi Arabia and head of the paper's Jeddah bureau from 2003 to 2004, before becoming Editor-in-Chief.

Over the years Alhomayed has had many exclusive interviews and stories. He was the first journalist to conduct an interview with Osama Bin Ladin's mother. After British tabloid The Sun printed pictures of Saddam Hussein as a prisoner, Alhomayed bought rights from the Sun, and Asharq Al Awsat was the only Arab newspaper to publish the picture of Saddam Hussein washing his clothes. It was reported around the world that Asharq Al Awsat had printed that picture on its front page.

Alhomayed relied heavily on syndications with respected newspapers and news agencies to re-publish their stories; by crediting them, he took Asharq Alawsat a step ahead of common practice in the Middle East in terms of respecting intellectual property rights.

Alhomayed launched several weekly supplements in Asharq Al Awsat, including Al Siyaha (Free Weekly Health Magazine), Alam Alriyadh (Free Weekly Sport's Magazine), Al Aqar (Real Estate), Azwak (Fashion and Style), Mazakat (Food Taste), Al Watar Al Sadis (Sixth String – TV, Cinema and Songs), Al Elaam (Media), Al Muntada Al Thakafi (Culture Forum) and Hasad Al Usbo (Week Harvest).

Alhomayed introduced the concept of an ombudsman to the newspaper, meaning an anonymous editor who writes a weekly critique of the newspaper's performance under a column called "Al Muraqeb Al Sahafi" (Journalism Monitor). From 2004, Asharq Al Awsat's ombudsman wrote extensively including a number of highly critical articles, but these came to a sudden stop. On 27 September 2010, nearly 4 years after the ombudsman column was stopped, Alhomayed announced that the column would be continued, revealed for the first time that it was the late Ahmed Al Rabey (a famous Kuwaiti journalist) who used to write the column in its previous format, and explained that the column had stopped due to Al Rabey's illness and death.

Alhomayed is widely criticised for publishing a series of vindictive articles about the State of Qatar between 2004 and 2008, a period that witnessed a disturbance in Saudi/Qatari official relations. In July 2008 Alhomayed apologized at the High Court in London "for any embarrassment" caused.

Alhomayed's era witnessed some major Saudi-related stories being ignored or censored, such as the Saudi princess who was granted asylum in the UK after facing death threats in her country for giving birth to 'love-child' of a British citizen.

The Washington Post editor Jim Hoagland characterised Almohayed in 2009 as "a courageous columnist". Alhomayed oversaw the launch of an iPad app for Asharq Al Awsat in 2011. On 1 January 2013, Alhomayed was replaced by Adel Al Toraifi as editor of Asharq Al Awsat.

Critics of Alhomayed claim he bans Asharq Al Awsat writers who are highly critical of Saudi Arabia or its allies. Alhomayed responded to Mona Eltahawy in both the English and Arabic version of Asharq Al Awsat.
