= Ain al-Yaqeen =

Ain al Yaqeen
- Categories: Newsmagazine
- Frequency: Weekly
- Country: Saudi Arabia
- Language: Arabic; English
- Website: Ain al Yaqeen

Ain al Yaqeen (Heart of the Matter in English) is an Arabic news magazine published weekly, focusing on political topics.

== Profile ==
Ain al Yaqeen also has an English edition. It is published online. The magazine is seen as a government publication or as a semi-official weekly political magazine.

== Contents ==
After it was revealed that a member of the royal family had indirectly funded one of the hijackers in the September 11 attacks, Prince Nayef in an article published in the English edition of the weekly on 29 November 2002 claimed that the Jews were behind the attacks.

== See also ==
- List of magazines in Saudi Arabia
