= Hana Hajjar =

Hana Hajjar (Arabic: هناء حجار) is a Saudi artist and political cartoonist for the Arab News. She is the youngest of nine children, and started drawing political cartoons at age 12. Her earliest cartoons dealt with the Israeli–Palestinian conflict and called for an end to it. Hajjar is one of a few female figures working for the Arab News and the only female political cartoonist in Saudi Arabia. Her caricatures deal with a varied range of subjects. She critiques both political figures as well as societal practices, including gender inequality, politics, and economics. She has stated also, that while her cartoons reflect discontent within society, she is careful not to push too hard so as to retain both her job and be able to continue publishing her work.

== Early life ==
Hana is the youngest sister of nine brothers. She started drawing cartoons at the age of twelve. She completed all her educational stages in Medina and then moved to Jeddah, where she settled. She studied art in various art institutes in Egypt.
