= Augusto Rubei =

Italian journalist

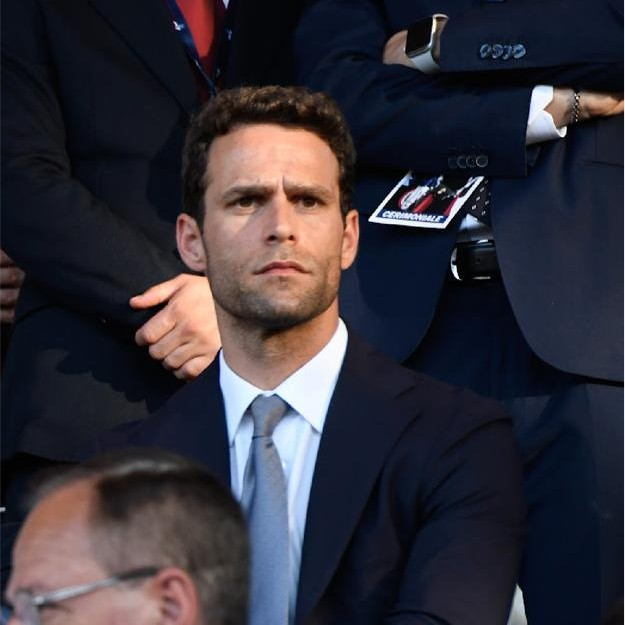

Augusto Rubei (born September 15, 1985) is an Italian journalist, writer and communication executive specializing in international relations and institutional communication. The Italian magazine l'Espresso has included him among the ten most influential Italian spin doctors of recent years..

== Career ==
He has contributed to the La Repubblica, Limes, Huffington Post, Micromega, Fanpage, il Fatto Quotidiano, Il Tempo and others, developing studies on the Nigerian terrorist cell Boko Haram and Somali group Al Shabaab.

In 2016, he directed the electoral campaign of the former mayor of Rome Virginia Raggi as campaign manager and spin doctor, leaving the office a few days after her election. On that occasion, he was considered the main architect of the mayor's win.

In the same years, he worked as a ghostwriter and political advisor for several parliamentarians and MEPs from Pd, Forza Italia, Lega and Udc, as well as for show business personalities and sports authorities.

In 2018, he contributed, again in the role of spin doctor, to the electoral campaign of the former Deputy Prime Minister and former leader of the M5S political party Luigi Di Maio.

He was a spokesman for the italian Ministry of Defence and for the Ministry of Foreign Affairs and International Cooperation.

The Corriere della Sera attributed to him "the communicative turning point" imprinted on Luigi Di Maio on the occasion of the change of government and Di Maio's more institutional profile.

The newspaper Italia Oggi considered him one of the main authors of the "new international image of Luigi Di Maio" and of his new pro-NATO approach.

In one of his usual report cards, the journalist Cesare Lanza defined Rubei as "atypical and free-minded", with "a strategic vision and an excellent network of relations with the foreign press".

On 27 December 2020 he was awarded the title of Cavaliere della Repubblica

On 24 June 2021, the Adnkronos news agency reported the passage of Augusto Rubei to the International Relations of Leonardo Spa, an appointment which, among others, received the applause of the former director of Tg1 and Sole 24 Ore, Gianni Riotta, who defined Rubei as an "attentive and cultured professional".

On 29 January 2023, Espresso included Rubei among the ten most influential communication strategists in Italy.

In September 2026, Rubei made his literary debut with La strada, a novel published by Piemme, part of the Mondadori Group. The book, freely inspired by his life, follows Pietro, known as "Pietruccio", a boy growing up in San Basilio, on the outskirts of Rome, and explores themes of social marginalisation, family hardship and personal redemption. The novel received attention from the Italian national press; Corriere della Sera and Il Messaggero described it as "an important read".
