= Hossam Al-Harthi =

Saudi Arabian footballer

Personal information
- Full name: Hossam Al-Harthi
- Date of birth: June 24, 1992 (age 34)
- Place of birth: Saudi Arabia
- Height: 1.70 m (5 ft 7 in)
- Position: Midfielder

Team information
- Current team: Kumait
- Number: 8

Youth career
- Al-Hilal

Senior career*
Years	Team	Apps	(Gls)
2011–2014	Al-Hilal	4	(0)
2013–2014	→ Al-Raed (loan)	0	(0)
2014–2015	Al-Riyadh		
2015–2016	Al-Orobah		
2016–2017	Al-Qaisomah	14	(0)
2018–2019	Najd		
2019–2020	Al-Sadd		
2021–	Kumait		
- * Club domestic league appearances and goals

Hossam Al-Harthi (Arabic: حسام الحارثي; born June 24, 1992) is a Saudi football player who plays for Kumait as a midfielder. He has also played in the Pro League for Al-Hilal.
