= Nature Arabic Edition =

- Discipline: Interdisciplinary
- Language: Arabic
- Edited by: Mohammed Yahia

Publication details
- History: October 2012 - present
- Publisher: Nature Research-Partnered with KACST (UK, Saudi Arabia)
- Frequency: Daily

Standard abbreviations
- ISO 4: Nat. Arab. Ed.

Links
- Journal homepage

Nature Arabic Edition is an online publication by Springer Nature (SN) in partnership with the King Abdulaziz City for Science and Technology. The magazine was started in 2012. It contains high-quality science news from the original Nature journal. The content of this journal is available online for free.

== See also ==
- List of magazines in Saudi Arabia
- Nature Research
