= Akhbar Al Dhahran =

Weekly Arabic newspaper published in Saudi Arabia (1954–1957)

- Type: Weekly newspaper
- Founders: Abdullah bin Abdul Rahman Al Malhooq; Abdul Karim Al Juhaiman
- Founded: 26 December 1954
- Ceased publication: 29 April 1957
- Language: Arabic
- Headquarters: Dammam
- Country: Saudi Arabia

Akhbar Al Dhahran (Arabic: Dhahran News) was a weekly nationalist newspaper published in Dammam between 1954 and 1957. It was the first newspaper published in the Eastern Province of the country.

== History and profile ==
Akhbar Al Dhahran was first published on 26 December 1954. Early issues of the paper were printed in Beirut and shipped to Dammam. The paper covered critical news in the country and attempted to raise an awareness among the people. It was known for its coverage of the nationalist articles and news on the corruption and maladministration in Saudi municipalities. Over time the weekly became a platform for nationalist Saudis to discuss the developments in the region.

Muhammad Abdullah Al Mana‘, a merchant and philanthropist, was among the frequent contributors of Akhbar Al Dhahran. The paper featured the nationalist poems by Hasan Faraj Al Umran, a Shia cleric and native of Qatif. Abdullah bin Abdul Rahman Al Malhooq served as the editor-in-chief. Abdul Karim Al Juhaiman was the last the editor-in-chief of the newspaper. His articles on the necessity of education for girls' and on gambling caused tension, and soon after this incident the last issue of the paper appeared on 29 April 1957. He was also arrested and released after 20-day detention.
