= Al Yamamah (magazine) =

Saudi Arabian news magazine

- Al Yamamah logo
- Editor-in-chief: Abdullah Al Jahlan
- Categories: Newsmagazine
- Frequency: Weekly
- Publisher: Al Yamamah Press Establishment
- Founder: Hamad Al Jassir
- Founded: 1953; 73 years ago
- Company: Al Yamamah Press Establishment
- Country: Saudi Arabia
- Based in: Riyadh
- Language: Arabic
- Website: Al Yamamah

Al Yamamah (Arabic: The Dove) is a weekly Arabic magazine published in Riyadh, Saudi Arabia. As of 2012 the editor-in-chief of the magazine was Abdullah Al Jahlan. Al Yamamah provides information about the Arab nation's issues and contemporary concerns.

== History and profile ==
It is one of the earliest magazines published in Saudi Arabia which was first published by a prominent Saudi Arabian journalist and historian Sheikh Hamad Al Jassir in Riyadh in 1953. It was launched as a monthly publication with 42 pages. It was first titled Al Riyadh and later was renamed as Al Yamamah. In the mid-1950s Abdul Rahman Al Shamrani, a former military officer in the National Guard, anonymously published articles criticizing the Saudi royals due to corruption.

In 1963, Al Yamamah Press Establishment began to publish the magazine on a weekly basis. It is, along with Sayidaty and The Majalla, a popular magazine in Saudi Arabia. The company is also publisher of a newspaper, Al Riyadh. Abdullah Al Jahlan served as the editor-in-chief of the magazine. Abdulaziz bin Abdullah Al Uqaili who was the deputy chief of Royal Protocol formerly served at the magazine's political desk.

In 1994 Al Yamamah sold 35,000 copies.

== See also ==
- List of magazines in Saudi Arabia
