= Ahmed al-Rubei =

Kuwaiti politician and professor (1949–2008)

Ahmed al-Rubei (Arabic: أحمد الربعي; 1949 in Al Murqab – 5 March 2008) was a prominent liberal Kuwaiti politician, journalist, and professor.

== Life ==
Kuwaiti graduated from Harvard University with a PhD in Islamic philosophy.

He was elected as a Member of Parliament in the National Assembly of Kuwait in 1985, 1992, and 1999. He also served as Kuwait's Minister of Education and Higher Education from 1992 to 1996 and was a professor in Kuwait University's Philosophy department.

He was a regular columnist for several newspapers, including Asharq Alawsat and Al-Qabas.

Kuwaiti died on 5 March 2008, after a two-year battle with brain cancer.
