= Al Fallah =

Weekly newspaper in Syria and Hejaz (1919–1924)

- Type: Weekly newspaper
- Format: Broadsheet
- Founder: Umar Shakir
- Founded: 31 October 1919
- Ceased publication: October 1924
- Political alignment: Nationalist
- Language: Arabic
- Headquarters: Damascus; Mecca
- Country: Syria; Kingdom of Hejaz

Al Fallah (Arabic: The Peasant) was a weekly newspaper which was first published in Damascus and then in Mecca. The paper existed between 1919 and 1924.

== History ==
Al Fallah was first published in Damascus on 31 October 1919. The owner of the paper was Umar Shakir who was sentenced to death by the French authorities. He fled Damascus and settled in Mecca where he restarted Al Fallah on 8 September 1920. The paper consisted of four pages published in broadsheet format twice per week, but became a weekly publication from 17 October 1920. It covered readers’ letters, entertaining articles, general and scientific articles and photographs which were not common in other Hejazi newspapers.

Al Fallah had a pan-Arabist political stance, and its subtitle was an inclusive Arabic newspaper in the service of Arabs and Arabic. The paper was also circulated in Palestine. Its early emphasis was on the independence of Syria, but later it became closer to Al Qibla, a newspaper of Sharif Hussein. Therefore, Al Fallah began to support his cause. The paper dissolved in October 1924 shortly after the Hashemite forces lost the rule of Mecca and Hejaz.
