= Somayya Jabarti =

Saudi Arabian reporter and editor

Somayya Anwar Jabarti (Arabic: سمية أنور جبرتي; born 1970 or 1971 (age 54–55)) is a Saudi Arabian reporter. She was the first woman editor-in-chief of a Saudi Arabian national newspaper, Saudi Gazette.

Somayya has reported on a spectrum of subjects from women’s issues to the stepping down of former Egyptian President Hosni Mubarak. She was the only Saudi reporter on the ground in the midst of the revolution in Tahrir Square.

Selected as one of the BBC 100 Women List in 2015, Jabarti was listed as one of Arabian Business Top 100 Most Powerful Arab Women in 2014 and 2015 and among Alarabiya's Top 10 Muslim women in 2014. She was the recipient of the Arab Woman of the Year Award for Media in 2015.

She became Assistant Editor-in-Chief of Arab News in 2019.
