= Destination (magazine) =

Saudi Arabian magazine

Destination KSA
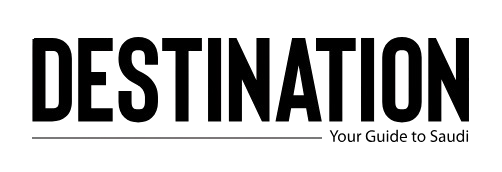
- Founder and Publisher: Enas Hashani
- Editor-in-chief: Maria Mahdaly
- Categories: Lifestyle magazine/City Guide
- Frequency: Monthly
- First issue: August 2008
- Company: Rumman Company
- Country: Saudi Arabia
- Based in: Jeddah; Riyadh
- Language: English
- Website: destinationksa.com

Destination Magazine is a city guide/lifestyle magazine that is published in Saudi Arabia by Rumman Media and Publishing House. Founded in 2008, the magazine has two editions catering to the cities of Jeddah and Riyadh. In 2016 Sharqiya was added to the list of cities that Destination Magazine writes about.

The magazine's subsections include: Business, special features, arts and entertainment, style and shopping, dining around town, healthy living, spirituality, travel trends, and explore Saudi Arabia.

Destination Jeddah (DJ) is 112 pages while Destination Riyadh (DR) is 96 pages. DJ and DR had a total distribution of 60,000 magazines monthly as of July 2015. DJ, DR and DS has 80,000 copies distributed in over 2,500 points in Saudi Arabia.

== Founding ==
Enas Hashani (former Editor-in-chief), the current CEO and publisher (2021), co-founded Rumman Company alongside Bayan Abuzinadah. She passed this baton to Maria Mahdaly, the magazine's third co-founder, announcing her as the magazine's editor-in-chief in 2018. .

== Brand history ==
The original Destination magazine was first published in 2008 with Enas Hashani as editor-in-chief. In 2010, following Destination's quick success, Rumman Company, the parent company, was ranked as Saudi Arabia's fastest-growing start-up by the All World Network. To further expand its reach, Destination launched a new edition of its magazine catering to the city of Riyadh in 2013. Since then, In 2018 all the cities were combined to create Destination KSA meant to cater the country under the banner of Guide to Saudi Arabia. Rumman Company has also ventured into LUB Creative, a boutique-style agency.

== Content and style ==
The magazines follow a yearly plan based on certain monthly themes including:

- Home Issue
- Arts Issue
- Wedding Issue
- Travel Issue
- Ramadan Issue
- Education Issue
- Fashion Issue
- Food Issue
- Health Issue
- Others depending on Editorial Strategy

== Going digital ==
In addition to the print versions of DJ and DR, the websites of both editions exist. Serving the same purpose as the print forms, the websites aim to guide sights and attractions, restaurants, shopping, housing, and businesses in both cities.

== Distribution ==
The magazine (DJ and DR) is distributed free of charge in certain locations which include: embassies, airport lounges, clinics, housing compounds, hotels, malls, cafe's, restaurants, gyms, and spas. It is also available at certain point-of-sale counters in supermarkets and delivered to its subscribers.

== Audience ==
Nationwide monthly readership of Destination stands at over 120,000. Destination's audience consists of English speaking locals, visitors, and tourists, mainly falling in the age group of 20-45. According to the magazine, its readers are described as "socially outgoing, and eager to participate in the community's leisurely activities". The readers "use the magazine to plan their activities for the entire month and to entertain friends and guests".

== More ventures ==
Rumman Company is an innovative Media and Publishing House based in Saudi Arabia. Rumman is best described as a holding company that owns, operates, and manages new media publishing and producing industries. The company has two major branches: Destination KSA magazine and the Lub creative agency.

== See also ==
- List of magazines in Saudi Arabia
