= Jihad Khazen =

Lebanese journalist

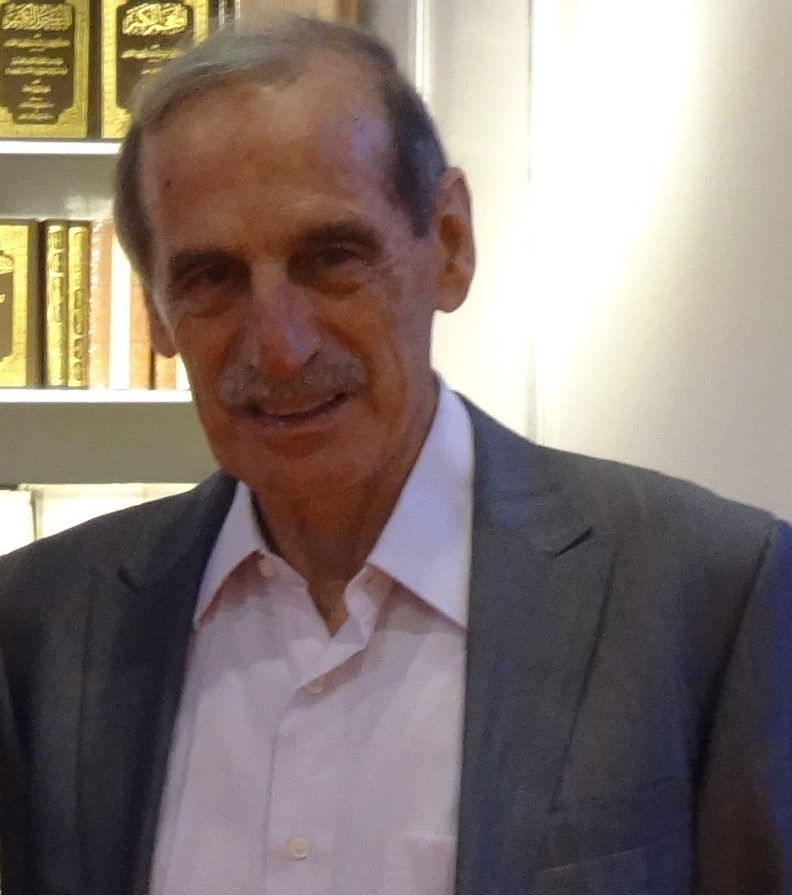
- Born: Jihad Khazen; June 24, 1939 (age 87); Palestine
- Citizenship: Lebanon
- Occupations: Political journalist, writer and editor

Jihad Al-Khazen (born June 24, 1939) is a Palestinian journalist and writer with Lebanese citizenship. He previously held posts as the editor-in-chief of The Daily Star in Beirut, Arab News in Jeddah, Middle East and Life in London.

== His life ==
Jihad was born in Palestine in 1939. His origins go back to the city of Ramallah in occupied Palestine, where his father was a caterer to the military. His father was killed in a terrorist attack by a Jewish militia and the family was forced to migrate to Lebanon. His family had resided in Ramallah, Palestine and moved permanently to Lebanon after 1948. He received a BA in political science in 1963, and a MA in Arabic literature from the American University of Beirut in 1975. He later enrolled in Georgetown University to study a PhD in political science but did not complete the course.

== Biography ==
In addition to his studies, Jihad worked as an editor and head of the shift at Reuters (now called Reuters) in Beirut. After graduating, he was appointed editor-in-chief of the Daily Star, and he kept his job at Reuters until 1969. At the beginning of the seventies, beside his work in the Daily Star, he co-published Al-Nahar Arab Report with Ghassan Tueni. When the Daily Star closed at the beginning of the Lebanese civil war, Jihad Al-Khazen was forced to leave Lebanon and has lived in London since 1975.

Arab News founded the first Saudi newspaper to be published in English in 1975 with Hisham Hafez and his brother Muhammad Hafez. However, the laws in the Kingdom of Saudi Arabia did not allow at that time the presence of a non-Saudi editor-in-chief, so Jihad al-Khazen was assigned the task of general manager and Ahmed Mahmoud as editor-in-chief. He later set out with the same group to found Al-Sharq al-Awsat newspaper in London in 1978, where he held the position of editor-in-chief and then a writer until 1986.

In London after a 12-year hiatus in 1988, Jamil Kamel Marwa was the editor-in-chief of Al-Hayat in its new edition, and Jihad Al-Khazen assumed the presidency of its board of directors, but 18 months after its publication, Jihad Al-Khazen headed its editor. He continued his work as editor-in-chief of the newspaper, until 1998, when George Semaan was appointed as editor-in-chief, and Jihad Al-Khazen continued to write a daily column in the newspaper entitled "Eyoon wa Azan".

== Positions ==
- Member of the board of directors of the Arab Thought Foundation.
- Member of the advisory board of the Center for Modern Contemporary Arab Studies, Georgetown University.
- Member of the board of directors of the Council for the Improvement of Arab-British Understanding (CABU).
- Member of the World Bank's Board of Advisors for the Middle East and North Africa for several years.

== Writings ==
year	Title	publishers
1985	Sabah al Kahyr (Good morning)	Saudi Research and Marketing Company
2005	Al mohafzon al jodd wa al masehyon wa al sohyonyon (Neoconservatives and Christian Zionism)	Dar al saqii
