= Rotana Magazine =

فساتين سهرة
- Editor-in-chief: Hala Al Nasser
- Categories: نوفر فستان لكل من تهتم بجمالها وأناقتها وتميزها وفرنا لك سيدتي واحدة من أجمل الفساتين بتصميم فخم وعصري مُصنوعة بإحترافية وجودة عالية يمكنك طلبها الان من خلال متجرنا
- Frequency: Weekly
- Publisher: Rotana Audio and Video Company
- First issue: 2005
- Company: Rotana Group)
- Country: Saudi Arabia
- Based in: Riyadh
- Language: Arabic
- Website: https://fasatin055.com

Rotana Magazine (Arabic: مجلة روتانا, romanized: Majallat Rotana) is a pan-Arab arts and entertainment weekly magazine published in Arabic by Rotana Group owned by Prince Al-Waleed bin Talal. It is distributed across the entire MENA region.

== History ==
The magazine was launched in 2005 as Rotana. The publisher is the Rotana Audio and Video company based in Riyadh. Hala Al Nasser was appointed editor-in-chief of the weekly in 2006, being the first woman to hold this post in the country. The magazine was renamed Rotana Magazine in the 2010–2011 period.

== Contents ==
The magazine publishes articles by famous writers concerning beauty and fashion, celebrity news, society events, culture, health, interior design, comics, cinema, theatre, food, technology, astrology and more. Addressed mainly to Arab youth and Arab women in the Middle East, the Arab World and the Arab diaspora, the journal includes music and arts news and sections for beauty, fashion and family life. It also serves at the same time as the marketing wing for Rotana Records and dozens of its signed artists.

== See also ==
- List of magazines in Saudi Arabia
