= Al Madina (newspaper) =

Saudi daily newspaper

- Type: Daily newspaper
- Owner(s): Al Madina Establishment for Press and Publishing
- Founder(s): Al Madina Establishment for Press and Publishing
- Publisher: Al Madina Establishment for Press and Publishing
- Founded: 8 April 1937; 89 years ago
- Language: Arabic
- Headquarters: Jeddah
- Country: Saudi Arabia
- Website: www.al-madina.com

Al Madina (Arabic: المدينة, lit. 'The City') is a newspaper published in Jeddah, Saudi Arabia. The paper is one of the oldest newspapers published in the country.

== History ==
Al Madina was founded as a weekly publication, under the name of Al Madinah al Munawarah (Arabic: Madinah the Radiant) by Hisham Hafiz's uncles, Othman and Ali Hafiz. Its first issue appeared on 8 April 1937. It was later published on a semi-weekly basis.

Publication ceased during World War II and resumed following the war. The paper was renamed Al Madinah in 1958, and its headquarters moved to Jeddah in the early 1960s. On 18 January 1964, Al Madinah was banned by the Lebanese Information Ministry due to reports considered harmful to Lebanon's reputation and national consciousness.

The newspaper has offices in Dubai and Cairo, in addition to 18 branches inside Saudi Arabia. In 2001, its circulation was 60,000 copies. The estimated circulation of the paper in 2003 was 46,000 copies.

== Political approach and contents ==
Every issue of Al Madina begins with the invocation of the name of the God. It is one of the pro-government newspapers in the country. However, Al Madina publishes critical coverage of non-political local news, such as social, health and educational issues and has relatively critical columnists, despite restraint in reporting or commenting on national politics. Some modernist or reformist columns have been published in the paper. For instance, writing in April 2010, Basma bint Saud said that she could not find Qur'anic, or other Islamic historical, basis for a state institution undertaking to promote virtue and prevent vice and that the arrests and beatings by religious policemen contribute to incorrect impressions about Islam.

Al Madina's article about Avicenna dated 1964 caused a diplomatic crisis between Saudi Arabia and the Imperial Iran due to the fact that he was described by the paper as an Arab thinker. On 2 August 2017 the newspaper criticized many Arab states said to maintain relations with Israel but deny it, [although] these ties can hardly be denied given the existence of embassies, and of mutual visits, in full view. It went on to call on Arab nations to end their hypocrisy, in which they "maintain relations" with Israel but "don’t want anybody to know about them".

== Prominent columnists ==
Hisham Hafiz and Khaled Almaeena served as the chief editors. Mohammad Ali Hafiz also served in the post between 1961 and 1964. Later, Saudi businessman, Ghalib Hamza Abulfaraj served as chief editor. As of 2012 Fahd Al Aqran was the editor-in-chief. As of 2012, the general manager of Al Arabiya TV, Abdulrahman Al Rashed was one of the paper's senior columnists.

== Status and awards ==
The publishing house Al Madina Press, the owner and publisher of the paper, is one of the most prominent companies in Saudi Arabia. Al Madinah was awarded two major prizes in Saudi Arabia in 2010: Makkah Prize of Distinction and Asir Prize "Al Muftaha".
