= Turki bin Salman Al Saud =

Saudi royal and businessman (born 1987)

- Born: 1987 (age 38–39); Riyadh
Names
- Turki bin Salman bin Abdulaziz
- House: Al Saud
- Father: Salman of Saudi Arabia
- Mother: Fahda bint Falah Al Hithlain
- Education: King Saud University

Turki bin Salman Al Saud (Arabic: تركي بن سلمان آل سعود Turkī ibn Salmān Āl Su‘ūd) (born 1987) is a Saudi prince, one of the grandsons of Saudi Arabia's founder King Abdulaziz, and businessman who is the chairman of Tharawat Holding Company. On 9 February 2013, he was appointed chairman of the Saudi Research and Marketing Group (SRMG) and served in the post until 6 April 2014.

== Early life and education ==
Turki was born in Riyadh in 1987. His mother is Fahda bint Falah Al Hithlain, the third spouse of King Salman. He is the ninth child of King Salman bin Abdulaziz. Turki is the second eldest child of King Salman and Fahda bint Falah. He is the full brother of Mohammed bin Salman, prime minister and crown prince of Saudi Arabia, and of Prince Khalid, the defense minister. Turki has a bachelor's degree in marketing from King Saud University.

== Career and activities ==
Turki was appointed chairman of the Saudi Research and Marketing Group (SRMG) in February 2013. He replaced his half-brother Prince Faisal in the post. Turki's term as chairman ended in April 2014 when he resigned from the post.

Prince Turki is the chairman of Tharawat Holding Company. He has been dealing with his family’s private fortunes and foreign investments since 2015.

== Ancestry ==
Ancestors of Turki bin Salman Al Saud

16. Faisal bin Turki bin Abdullah Al Saud
8. Abdul Rahman bin Faisal Al Saud
17. Sara bint Mishari bin Abdulrahman bin Hassan Al Saud
4. Abdulaziz ibn Saud
18. Ahmed Al Kabir bin Mohammed bin Turki Al Sudairi
9. Sara bint Ahmed Al Sudairi
2. Salman bin Abdulaziz Al Saud
20. Mohammed bin Ahmed Al Kabir Al Sudairi
10. Ahmed bin Mohammed Al Sudairi
5. Hussa bint Ahmed Al Sudairi
22. Ali bin Mohammed Al Suwaidi
11. Sharifa bint Ali bin Mohammed Al Suwaidi
1. Turki bin Salman Al Saud
24. Hithlain Al Ajman
12. Sultan bin Hithlain
6. Falah bin Sultan
3. Fahda bint Falah Al Hithlain
14. Abdullah
7. Munira bint Abdullah
