= Hisham Hafiz =

Saudi Arabian news publisher (1931–2006)

- Born: 28 April 1931; Madinah
- Died: 26 February 2006 (aged 76); Beirut
- Occupations: Publisher and author
- Website: Hisham Ali Hafiz webpage

Hisham Ali Hafiz (28 April 1931 - 26 February 2006) was a Saudi Arabian newspaper publisher and author. He is best known for co-founding Arab News and his Saudi Research and Publishing Company published 16 newspapers and magazines at the time of his death. He has also written a number of collections of poetry and nonfiction.

== Early career ==
Hafiz was born on 28 April 1931 in Medina where his father and uncle founded the Al Madina newspaper in 1937. He and his brother Mohammad Hafiz worked at the paper during school holidays. He studied economics and political science at Cairo University while undertaking military studies at The Egyptian Military Academy. He completed his studies in 1955.

After serving as a lieutenant in the Saudi Army, he became an officer in the Saudi Ministry of Foreign Affairs. He became the editor-in-chief of Al Madina in 1961 before King Faisal nationalised Saudi newspapers without compensation in 1963. The Saudi Government banned him from working as a journalist after a couple of years so he rejoined the Ministry of Foreign Affairs.

== Saudi Research and Publishing ==
He founded Saudi Research and Publishing in 1971 with Mohammad Hafiz. They saw the potential of economic growth attracting expatriates from around the world. Their first publication was Arab News, the first English-language daily newspaper in Saudi Arabia with the first edition published in 1974. The success of Arab News led to the founding of an international Arabic-language newspaper Asharq Alawsat in 1978. Today, Arab News and Asharq Alawsat are published internationally.

The success of these publications led to Saudi Research and Publishing developing a number of publications catering to both Saudi citizens and expatriate workers from India and Pakistan.

== Writer ==
In 1991, Hafiz published his first volume of poetry Words with Rhythm with four volumes of that name published during the 1990s.

== Death ==
Hisham Hafiz died in Beirut in February 2006 and was buried in his hometown Madinah.

== See also ==
- List of newspapers in Saudi Arabia
