= Al Riyadh (newspaper) =

Daily newspaper in Saudi Arabia

- Type: Daily newspaper
- Format: Broadsheet
- Owner: Al Yamamah Press Establishment
- Publisher: Al Yamamah Press Establishment
- Editor-in-chief: Turki Al Sudari
- Associate editor: Yousuf Al Kuwailit (2012)
- Managing editor: Nawal Al Rashed (for women section)
- Founded: 11 May 1965; 61 years ago
- Political alignment: Pro-government
- Language: Arabic
- Headquarters: Riyadh
- Country: Saudi Arabia
- OCLC number: 12593490
- Website: Arabic website; English website

Al Riyadh (Arabic: الرياض) is a Riyadh-based, pro-government Saudi daily newspaper. Its sister paper was Riyadh Daily that was in circulation between 2003 and 1 January 2004. Al Riyadh is one of the dominant papers in Nejd.

== History and ownership ==
Al Riyadh is the first daily newspaper that was published in Arabic in Riyadh. Its first issue was published on 11 May 1965 with a limited number of pages. Later, it became a daily publication with 52 pages, 32 pages of which were colored pages. Its current issues are with 80-100 pages. The paper is published in broadsheet format.

Al Riyadh is also pioneer in other aspects. It is the first Saudi paper that included caricatures which were drawn by Ali Kharjy, a then-leading caricaturist. It is argued that Al Riyadh gained popularity among the public due to these caricatures at the end of the 1960s.

Al Riyadh is owned and published by Al Yamamah Press Establishment. The company is also the publisher of weekly magazine Al Yamamah. In 2006 it employed five women to improve the editorial design of the publications, including Al Riyadh.

== Political approach ==
Al Riyadh is officially independent in that it is being published by a private company. However, the World Association of Newspapers considered the paper to be under the direct influence of King Salman during his post as the Riyadh governor. In a study dated 2023 it is reported that it is under the control of Crown Prince and Prime Minister Mohammed bin Salman. The World Association of Newspapers also regards Al Riyadh as a semi-official newspaper. It is further argued that the paper presents relatively conservative attitude and praises House of Saud as many of the other Saudi daily papers. Although Al Riyadh is usually regarded as a pro-government newspaper, it expresses relatively liberal views. Additionally, it publishes very influential editorials, if one wants to have good insight into what the Saudi official view on different matters.

== Content ==
Al Riyadh employs the following news feeds: AFP Arabic, AFP Sports, AP, DPA Arabic, GPA Arabic, Kuwait News Agency Arabic, MENA Arabic, QNA Arabic, Saudi Press Agency Arabic, Reuters Arabic, Reuters Photos, Reuters Graphics, RSS news, and full-body feeds from PR Newswire, GNN Network and CCN Matthews. The paper heavily covers the news regarding political, social, religious, economic and cultural events. It also provides its readers with sports news. It is one of the few newspapers in Saudi Arabia which publish unsigned editorials.

Turki Al Sudairi, the chief editor of the paper, argued in December 2011 that Iran was much more dangerous threat for Saudi Arabia than Israel, since the latter's enmity is limited to Palestinians. On 23 March 2012 Yousuf Al Kuwailit, the associate editor of Al Riyadh, questioned the Russian foreign minister Sergey Lavrov's stance concerning Syrian uprising and stated that Lavrov did not seem to be aware of the fact that Sunnis are the majority in Syria. Al Kuwailit further claimed that Lavrov had sided with the devil in this regard.

In March 2013, the then Lebanese foreign minister Adnan Mansour publicly argued that the Arab League should reinstate Syria's membership. After this declaration, Al Riyadh described Mansour as "the foreign minister of the terrorist Amal Movement," due to Mansour's close relations with the Lebanese parliament speaker Nabih Berri, who is also the leader of the Amal Movement. The daily further claimed that Hassan Nasrallah, the Hezbollah leader, is "a terrorist".

== Influence and audience ==
Al Riyadh is regarded as one of the major daily newspapers published in Saudi Arabia. The others are Al Watan, Al Madina and Al Jazirah. Al Riyadh is described as one of the most respected dailies for local and regional news.

Since the paper is edited and published in Riyadh, its target population is government officials, military officials, professionals, academics and businesspeople.

== Prominent columnists ==
The chief editor of the paper is Turki Al Sudairi who has held the post for a long time. He is regarded as a pro-government editor. Al Sudairi has been the chairman of the Saudi Journalists Association (SJA) for a long time, and he was elected again for the post on 17 May 2012. Nawal Al Rashed, one of the women journalists with Al Riyadh, was elected to the nine-member of the SJA board in 2004.

Sultan Al Bazie who is the executive vice president of International Public Relations Association-Gulf Chapter (IPRA GC) and co-founder CEO of Attariq Communications was formerly a reporter and managing editor for Al Riyadh. Abdulaziz bin Abdullah Al Uqaili who was the deputy chief of Royal Protocol formerly served at the paper's political desk.

== Circulation and offices ==
The paper sold 25,000 copies in 1975. In 2001 the paper had a circulation of 121,000 copies, being the third best selling Saudi newspaper. As for 2002, its estimated circulation was 91,000 copies. It was 170,000 copies in 2003, making it the largest newspaper in the country. Arab Reform Bulletin reported its 2004 circulation as 170,000. Its 2006 and 2007 circulations were 150,000 copies. Global Investment House reported that Al Riyadh's 2009 market share is about 8.3%.

The paper has a website, where readers can comment on articles. The website won the digital excellence award in the second rank after Al Jazirah by the Saudi ministry of Communications and Information Technology in 2007.

Al Riyadh has also an English-website which was the seventh top online newspaper among the fifty English-language online newspapers in the MENA region in 2010. In 2011, it was again among top ten online newspapers, keeping its rank as the seventh.

The paper's Arabic online version was the fifth most visited website for 2010 in the MENA region. In 2012, it was again ranked to be the fifth in the MENA region by Forbes Middle East with 123.9 million hits.

Al Riyadh has offices in many Saudi cities in addition to its editorial offices in Cairo and Beirut.
