= Saudi Research and Media Group =

Saudi publishing company

- Type: Public
- Traded as: Tadawul: 4210
- ISIN: SA000A0JK5M3
- Industry: Media
- Founded: 1972; 54 years ago
- Headquarters: Riyadh
- Key people: Hisham Hafiz and Mohammed Ali Hafiz (founders), Abdulrahman bin Ibrahim Rwaita (chairman), Jomana Alrashid (Chief Executive Officer)
- Products: Newspapers, magazines
- Revenue: SAR 3,046 million (2021)
- Total assets: 5,748,512,000 Saudi riyal (2019)
- Owner: Al Ahli Capital Fund 13 29.90% Al Ahli Capital Fund 4 29.90%
- Number of employees: 2,700 employees
- Website: www.srmg.com/en

Saudi Research and Media Group (SRMG), also known as the Saudi Media Group, is a Saudi state-backed media company registered in Riyadh. The group mainly publishes, prints and distributes various publications. The company operates in Saudi Arabia, where there are no independent media.

The company has close ties to the Mohammed bin Salman government of Saudi Arabia. King Salman's sons have chaired the company. Its closeness to the Saudi government has led it to be considered an outlet for the government in the west, particularly in the United Kingdom.

In April 2022, SRMG announced its new headquarters in Riyadh's King Abdullah Financial District (KAFD). This marks the beginning of SRMG's global expansion and will house the offices of the Asharq network.

== History ==
The establishment of the SRMG dates back to 1963 when the first company of the group, Al Madina Printing and Publication Company, was founded. Al Madina Printing and Publication Company, was later called Saudi Printing and Packaging Company (SPPC) which was formally established in 1972. Hisham and Mohammed Ali Hafiz were one of the founders of the company. Kamal Adham, former head of Saudi intelligence, was also one of the early shareholders of the company.

Next, the company was established in London in 1978 with the launch of Asharq Al Awsat. Ten years later, on 5 July 1988, it was registered as a limited liability company in Riyadh and then converted into a joint stock company in 2000.

The company was listed in the Saudi stock market, Tadawul, on 8 April 2006 and therefore went public. In August 2008, an independent board of trustees of the company was formed, making it the first Arab media company with such a body.

Jomana Alrashid was appointed CEO of SRMG in October 2020, becoming the first woman to hold the position.

Following Saudi Crown Prince Mohammed bin Salman's visit to Egypt in June 2022, SRMG agreed to fund the launch of the three Egyptian news channels in Cooperation with the General Intelligence Service (GIS) owned United Media Services (UMS).

In May 2021, the company was renamed from "The Saudi Research and Marketing Group" to "Saudi Research and Media Group".

In 2023, SRMG recorded its highest quarterly profit since its listing on the Saudi Stock Exchange in 2006 at SAR 249 million.

== Major shareholders ==
The company has often been related to the Saudi King Salman bin Abdulaziz. However, he is neither the chairman nor the shareholder of the company.

Major shareholders of the SRMG are as follows:

- Al Ahli Capital Fund 13 29.90%
- Al Ahli Capital Fund 4 29.90%

From 1989 to his death in 2002, Ahmed bin Salman was the chairman of the company. Then, his younger brother Faisal bin Salman became the chairman of the company. On 9 February 2013, Turki bin Salman succeeded Prince Faisal as chairman of the SRMG when the latter was appointed governor of the Madinah province. Prince Turki's term as chairman ended in April 2014 when he resigned from the post.

On 13 December 2015 the board of directors appointed Badr bin Abdullah Al Saud as the chairman and an independent member of the board. Al Saud resigned from his position in 2018, with Dr Ghassan bin Abdulrahman Al-Shibil succeeding him as chairman in June 2018. After a three-year tenure, the current chairman Abdulrahman Ibrahim Alrowaita was appointed by the group in May 2021.

== Business fields ==
SRMG is the largest publishing company in the Middle East engaged mainly in providing information products and services by publishing newspapers and magazines across the Middle East and globally. The company owns more than 30 daily, weekly and monthly newspapers and magazines, including Asharq Al Awsat, Arab News, Al Majalla, Urdu News, Arrajol and Al Eqtisadiah.

In 2021, SRMG titles were reported to have a combined monthly reach of 165 million. In July 2021, the company changed its business model with five divisions: media, international, events, research and polling, and innovation. Additionally, the company also deals with marketing, advertising and distributing services heavily across the MENA region and Europe. SRMG operates in 18 locations internationally.

SRMG has a free-to-air channel called Asharq Documentary, which airs Arabic-language factual content.

=== Subsidiaries, associates and joint ventures ===
Major subsidiaries, associates and joint ventures of SRMG are given as follows:

Company	Major activity	Country
Al Khaleejiah Advertising and Public Relations Company	Advertising and public relations services	Saudi Arabia
Argaam Commercial Investment Company	Publishing and electronic content	Saudi Arabia
Moutamarat Company for Exhibitions and Conferences	Holding and organizing specialized exhibitions, conferences and forums	Saudi Arabia
Saudi Distribution Company	Distribution	Saudi Arabia
Saudi Specialized Printing	Specialized Printing	Saudi Arabia
Saudi Distribution Co.	Publishing and Distribution	Saudi Arabia
Sayidaty Products Co.	Commercial activities	Grenzee Islands
IPM Ltd Registering	Maintenance and possession of intellectual properties of the Group	Grenzee Islands
Global Media and Partners Ltd	Commercial activities	Cayman Islands
Arab Media Company Ltd.	Printing and publishing	Saudi Arabia
Al Ofoq Information Systems and Communication Company	Information systems and communication	Saudi Arabia
Saudi Research and Publishing Company	Research and publishing	Saudi Arabia
Saudi Commercial Company	Trading in perfumes, household items, and printing supplies	Saudi Arabia
Middle East Company Ltd.	Printing and publishing	United Kingdom
EuroMena Co. (Previously Satellite Graphics Co.)	Commercial activities	United Kingdom
Sayidaty Limited Company	Commercial activities	Grenzee Islands
Media Investment Co. Ltd	Rental Services	United Kingdom
Majallah Company	Commercial activities	United Kingdom
Gulf British Company	Advertising	United Kingdom
Asharq Al Awsat Co. Ltd	Main Center Activities	United Kingdom
Arab Media Company	Commercial activities	United Kingdom
HH Saudi Research and Marketing Company	Publishing and distribution	United Kingdom
Satellite Graphics Company	Printing	United Kingdom
Arab Net Technology Ltd.	Internet services	United Kingdom
Moroccan Printing and Publishing Company	Printing and publishing	Morocco
Kuwait Group for Publishing, and Distribution Company Ltd.	Distribution	Kuwait
Emirates Printing, Publishing, and Distribution Company Ltd.	Distribution	UAE
Alsharq Company for News Services Ltd	Television Broadcasting and Radio and Forums	UAE
VOX Asia Productions Limited	Media and advertising	Pakistan
Asharq News Services	Multimedia (Online + TV)	Saudi, UAE
