= Al Eqtisadiah =

Arabic business newspaper in Saudi Arabia

- Type: Daily business newspaper
- Owner: Saudi Research and Marketing Group
- Founders: Hisham Hafiz; Mohammad Hafiz
- Founded: 1962; 64 years ago
- Language: Arabic
- Headquarters: Riyadh; Dhahran
- Country: Saudi Arabia
- Sister newspapers: Arab News; Asharq al Awsat
- OCLC number: 264791347
- Website: Al Eqtisadiah

Al Eqtisadiah (Arabic: الاقتصادية, romanized: The Economy) is a Saudi daily business newspaper, published by Saudi Research and Publishing Company. It has been in circulation since 1962.

== History ==
Al Eqtisadiah was first launched as an economic daily in 1962 by brothers Mohammad and Hisham Hafiz. Later, it began to be published by Saudi Research and Publishing Company, a subsidiary of Saudi Research and Marketing Group, on 12 January 1992.

The paper has a Gulf edition.

== Target audience ==
Al Eqtisadiah is often called "The Financial Times of Saudi Arabia". Therefore, its target population is primarily businesspeople as well as academics, and senior government employees in the Kingdom and the GCC.

Al Eqtisadiah is reported to rapidly secure a loyal readership of Saudi executives and government officials. The paper is also read by educated Saudi women and female students.

== Ownership ==
Al Eqtisadiah is one of the daily newspapers published by Saudi Research and Publishing Company (SRPC)], one of the Saudi Research and Marketing Group (SRMG) companies. The other daily newspapers published by SRPC are Arab News and Al Sharq Al Awsat. As of 2013 the chairman of SRMG was Turki bin Salman Al Saud.

== Content ==
Al Eqtisadiah provides both news coverage and research, analysis and commentary on economic and business-related events at domestic, regional and international levels. It also provides the translated articles and news from major international business publications, including the Financial Times, the Harvard Business Review, INSEAD, and Frankfurter regarding major economic events and developments.

The newspaper closely deals with consumer affairs as well as financial trends within the region and abroad. It offers its readers opinions about their financial initiatives and investments. It monitors the developments throughout the Kingdom by focusing on social and economic trends and uncovering important issues that have impact on communities as well as the country's economy as a whole. Additionally, daily in-depth articles published provide an analysis of how developments may affect the Saudi economy.

Although Al Eqtisadiah was founded as a financial daily paper, it is equally known for its political content, often printing editorials and opinion harshly critical of the US on a number of fronts. On the other hand, during the term of its former chief editor Abdul Wahab Al Faiz, Al Eqtisadiah a few years before 2009 appeared to return to its original finance-focus, gradually moving away from political opinion and focusing on themes of interest to the region's business elite.

However, Al Eqtisadiah seems to return to the pre-Al Faiz period, since editor-in-chief Salman Al Dossari published an article challenging the Russia's stance over Syrian government on 24 March 2012. Specifically, Al Dossari harshly criticized Russia, especially Sergey Lavrov, for supporting Bashar al-Assad and argued that the same tactics used by Russia to oppress Muslim majority in Chechnya and the Caucasus have been used by Assad to oppress Sunni majority in Syria.

The paper also contains a section on environmental issues which is published weekly.

== Circulation ==
Al Eqtisadiah had a circulation of 76,928 copies in the beginning of the 2000s. In 2007 the paper sold about 60,000 copies. The paper's website was the eighth among top 63 online newspapers of the Arab world in a ranking published by Forbes Middle East magazine in 2011.

== Chief editors ==
Former editor-in-chief of Al Eqtisadiah was Muhammad Faraj Al Tunisi, who resigned for personal reasons in 2003. He had been in this post since 1992. Abdul Wahap Al Faiz was the chief editor of Al Eqtisadiah from 2003 to October 2011 when he was made editor-in-chief of Arab News, replacing Khalid Almaeena. Salman bin Yousuf Al Dossary was appointed to the post in October 2011. Al Dossari was working as assistant editor in chief of Asharq al Awsat before his appointment.

== TV channel ==
There is also a TV channel bearing the same name, Al Eqtisadiah TV, that broadcasts economy news. The channel launched its YouTube channel in November 2012.
