= Asharq Al-Awsat =

International Arabic-language newspaper

Asharq al-Awsat
- Official logo

- Front page of Asharq Al-Awsat
- Type: Daily newspaper
- Format: Broadsheet
- Owner: Saudi Research and Media Group
- Editor-in-chief: Ghassan Charbel
- Founded: 1978
- Language: Arabic, English, Turkish, Urdu, Persian
- Headquarters: London, England
- Circulation: 234,561 (as of 2004)
- ISSN: 0265-5772
- Website: aawsat.com (Arabic) english.aawsat.com (English)

Asharq Al-Awsat (Arabic: الشرق الأوسط, romanized: Aš-Šarq al-ʾAwsaṭ, lit. 'The Middle East') is an Arabic international newspaper headquartered in London, England. A pioneer of the "off-shore" model in the Arabic press, the paper is often noted for its distinctive green-tinted pages.

Although published under the name of a private company, Saudi Research and Media Group (SRMG), the paper was founded with the approval of the Saudi royal family and government ministers, and is noted for its support of the Saudi government. The newspaper is owned by Faisal bin Salman bin Abdulaziz Al Saud, a member of the Saudi royal family.

Asharq Al-Awsat covers events through a network of bureaus and correspondents throughout the Arab world, Europe, the United States, and Asia. The paper also has copyright syndications with The Washington Post, Los Angeles Times, The New York Times, and Global Viewpoint, permitting it to publish Arabic translations of columnists like Thomas Friedman and David Ignatius.

== History ==
=== Founding ===
Launched in London in 1978, and printed on four continents in 14 cities, the paper is often billed as "the leading Arab daily newspaper," and calls itself "the premier pan-Arab daily newspaper" based on the fact that past estimates of its circulation have given it the largest circulation of the off-shore pan-Arab dailies, a category including its chief competitor Al-Hayat. However, reliable estimates are available only from the early 2000s, before rival Al-Hayat launched a massive effort to increase circulation in Saudi Arabia.

The paper's first editor-in-chief Jihad Khazen, now a columnist and editor emeritus for the rival pan-Arab daily Al-Hayat, gave credit to Hisham Hafiz, with the subsequent support of his brother Mohammed Ali Hafez, for the initial idea of establishing an Arabic-language newspaper in London. Then the daily was launched in 1978. Former editor-in-chief Othman Al Omeir has likewise given credit to the brothers, Hisham and Mohammad Hafiz, for founding and then overseeing the paper. Together with El Khazen, the brothers set out to prove the value of the idea through a number of trial issues to the then-crown prince and later king Fahd, who had initially warmed to the thought but then lost his enthusiasm. Khazen also gave credit to the then-Saudi ambassador to London and then-deputy minister of information in helping gain Fahd's verbal approval for issuing the newspaper while the prince was on an official visit to England.

=== Controversy over the Camp David Accords ===
After the news of the paper's first big scoop (regarding the formation of the U.S. Central Command for the Middle East), the still new newspaper made its name through the controversy surrounding the Egypt–Israel peace treaty.

In the face of widespread criticism from contributors and staff toward the Camp David Accords and Egyptian president Anwar Sadat, Cairo bureau chief Salah al Din Hafez resigned. Then, Sadat held a press conference with the new Asharq Al Awsat bureau chief by his side in which the Egyptian president attacked the newspaper and its stance toward the peace process in general, citing his suspicions of the bureau chief's "high" salary, and accusing Prince Fahd of using the newspaper as a weapon against Egypt and the Egyptian president personally.

Khazen later reminisced about the events, saying: "I think that this press conference was worth a million dollars (in its value at the time) of free publicity for the newspaper, which since became the subject of interest for many foreign governments and the foreign media."

=== Debated reporting 2004-08 ===
Ex-editor Alhomayed is widely criticised for publishing a series of vindictive articles about the State of Qatar between 2004 and 2008, a period that witnessed a disturbance in Saudi/Qatari official relations. The highlight of that phase was when the paper published three reports about the Qatari prime minister Sheikh Hamad bin Jassim al-Thani's trip to an Arab foreign ministers' conference in Beirut during the Lebanon conflict in August 2006. Asharq Al Awsat claimed in August 2006 that he had held discussions with Israeli ministers en route to the conference, briefing them on the Arab position. Sheikh Hamad denied the allegations and Asharq Al Awsat printed a second article, accusing him of lying. A third piece in March 2007, an opinion piece written by Alhomayed himself, repeated the claims.

However, in July 2008, Alhomayed stated that the allegations were untrue and apologized at the High Court in London "for any embarrassment" caused. In its apology, which the newspaper also published in its print and web edition, Alhomayed said that "Sheikh Hamad did not hold secret discussions with the Israeli government en route to the Beirut Conference". Sheikh Hamad's solicitor, Cameron Doley, said: "It is an unequivocal victory. Allegations of that nature at that time could have been damaging to him and Qatar. The paper has accepted that it got it wrong. My client is happy with that—there was never anything more in it for him than getting that admission." This story was confirmed in Asharq Al Awsat's sister publication, Arab News, which reported that the settlement had been reached amicably out of court without any payment for damages.

However, on another occasion Asharq Al Awsat was accused of publishing a false interview regarding football club Portsmouth. The following day The Guardian mentioned that the interview was actually true.

=== Prominent editors ===
In addition to Jihad Khazen, other well-known past editors include Erfan Nizameddine, Othman Al Omeir (founder of Elaph), and Abdul Rahman Al Rashed (general manager of Al Arabiya between April 2004 and November 2014).

Former editor was Tariq Alhomayed whose leadership earned mixed reviews as it was associated with much criticism of Asharq Al-Awsat. In July 2012, Adel Al Toraifi, chief editor of The Majalla, was appointed deputy chief editor of Asharq Al Awsat. On 1 January 2013, Al Toraifi replaced Alhomayed as editor of the paper. Al Toraifi's term ended in July 2014.

=== Notable columns ===
In 2016, Asharq al-Awsat published a report accusing Iranian pilgrims taking part in the Shiite Muslim commemoration of Arbaeen in Iraq of sexually harassing women, which was proven to be false, according to Agence France-Presse; the paper sacked its Baghdad correspondent over a report. The article had said that a World Health Organization (WHO) report had described "unplanned pregnancies and [...] disease" seen "following the arrival of scores of unregulated Iranians to take part in the annual Shia pilgrimage to Karbala." According to the article, 169 unmarried women had become pregnant from the Iranian pilgrims. The United Nations's health agency said no such report had been published by the WHO, and condemned mentioning its name in what it called "unfounded" news. According to Rana Sidani, spokeswoman for the WHO, the organization was "shocked" by the report. She said that they were "consulting with the Iraqi ministry of health on possible legal action against the paper." Haider al-Abadi, Iraqi prime minister, and "several other leading Shiite figures" condemned the Asharq al-Awsat's report and demanded an "apology".

In April 2019, Saudi journalist businessman Hussein Shobakshi published a column in Asharq Al-Awsat in which he condemned the prevalence of antisemitism in Islamic culture. He claimed that this antisemitism had led to the Jewish exodus from Arab and Muslim countries. "The intensity of the Jew-hatred," he wrote, "disseminated by the media and art, literature, and political cartoons has reached a degree that cannot be ignored." He continued: "antisemitism in the Arab world is the product of loathsome, racist education that is rooted in the Arab mentality that is used to labeling people according to tribal, family, and racial affiliation, and according to the religious school which they belong. It is this education that prompted thousands of Jews were citizens of Arab countries to emigrate after the establishment of the State of Israel."

== Reputation and competition ==
The newspaper is owned by Faisal bin Salman, and is considered more pro-Saudi than its rival Al-Hayat was. Asharq Al-Awsat has billed itself as the "leading international Arabic paper," as it was the first Arabic daily to use satellite transmission for simultaneous printing in a number of sites across the world. Media scholar Marc Lynch has called Asharq al-Awsat "the most conservative" of the major pan-Arab papers.

The New York Times in 2005 called Asharq Al-Awsat "one of the oldest and most influential in the region."

The paper's chief competitors in Saudi Arabia are Al Hayat and Okaz; globally, its chief competitor is Al Hayat, though it is often paired with Al-Quds Al-Arabi which is considered to be its polar opposite. According to this dichotomy, Asharq Al Awsat represents the "moderate camp" when compared to the "rejection camp" of Al-Quds Al-Arabi.

== Editorial stances ==
=== Alleged banning of critical writers, 2006–2010 ===
One example is Mona Eltahawy, who wrote for the paper from January 2004 to early 2006, focusing on protests against the Mubarak government in Egypt. She wrote that its new English-language website, designed to present a liberal face to the world, was far more critical of Arab governments than its Arabic editions:

The trouble with Asharq al-Awsat, beyond its disturbing acquiescence to Arab regimes, is that it claimed a liberalism that was patently false ... the newspaper in Arabic would abide by the red lines that govern criticism of Arab leaders while in English it ran roughshod over those very same lines. A column I wrote tearing into the Egyptian regime for allowing its security forces to beat peaceful protesters and to sexually assault female journalists and demonstrators was spiked from the Arabic newspaper and web site but appeared in its entirety on the English web site. ... The major red lines at Asharq al-Awsat could be quite simple—in descending order they were the Saudi royal family, Saudi Arabia's allies in the Gulf (Qatar, a rival, was considered fair game) and then Saudi Arabia's other Arab allies. Within such a hierarchy of red lines, the Egyptian regime can indeed pull rank and demand that Asharq al- Awsat silence a critic.

Alhomayed responded to Eltahawy in both the English and Arabic version of Asharq Al-Awsat. Eltahawy noted that in the majority of cases the writer was left to discover on their own that he or she was banned rather than receiving a reason or justification from Alhomayed.

Nothing official was reported about the matter until 16 September 2010 when the paper quoted Al Rashed saying that he voluntarily stopped writing for them. On 18 September 2010, Al Rashed returned to writing in Asharq Al-Awsat. As of 2021, he remains a regular contributor.

== See also ==
- Al-Monitor
- Middle East Monitor
- Middle East Eye
- The New Arab
