= British Arabs =

British citizens of Arab descent

British Arabs عرب بريطانيا
- Distribution by local authority in the 2011 census.

Total population
- United Kingdom: 355,977 – 0.5% (2021/22 Census); England: 320,215 – 0.6% (2021); Scotland: 22,304 – 0.4% (2022); Wales: 11,641 – 0.4% (2021); Northern Ireland: 1,817 – 0.1% (2021)

Regions with significant populations
- London; Birmingham; Manchester; Sheffield; Glasgow; Liverpool; Cardiff; Leeds

Languages
- Arabic; British English

Religion
- Predominantly Islam (83.7%); minority follows Christianity (4.1%) and other faiths (0.7%) (Note: Including Judaism (0.1%), Buddhism (0.04%), Hinduism (0.03%) and Sikhism (0.02%)) or are irreligious (4.8%); 2021 census, NI, England and Wales only

Related ethnic groups
- Arab diaspora; British Emiratis; Lebanese Britons; British Palestinians; Syrian Britons; Yemeni Britons

British Arabs (Arabic: عرب بريطانيا) are British citizens of Arab descent. They share a common Arab ethnicity, culture, language and identity from different Arab countries. Arabs also come from non-Arab countries as ethnic minorities (e.g., Khuzestani Arabs and Israeli Arabs).

The 2021 United Kingdom census recorded a population of 355,977 or 0.5% of the population in the United Kingdom, with about 40% of the whole population residing in Greater London. In 2005, the BBC found that the majority of Arab residents in London hailed from Egypt, Morocco, Palestine, Yemen, Lebanon, the Gulf States, and Iraq. The 2011 census recorded a population of 249,911 in Great Britain, with no specific figure recorded for Northern Ireland as the Arab category was introduced later in Northern Ireland.

== Overview ==
=== Census designation ===
"British Arabs" is used as an ethnic designation by the National Association of British Arabs. It is also employed by academics, and in the media. Unlike Black British or Asian British, the term "British Arab" was not one of those employed in government ethnicity categorisations used in the 2001 UK Census and for national statistics. As a result, community members are believed to have been under-counted in previous population estimates according to the National Association of British Arabs (NABA).

This absence of a separate "Arab" category in the UK census obliged many to select other ethnicity categories. In the late 2000s, the British government announced that an "Arab" ethnicity category would be added to the 2011 UK Census for the first time. The decision came following lobbying by the National Association of British Arabs and other Arab organizations, who argued for the inclusion of a separate "Arab" entry to accommodate under-reported groups from the Arab world.

== History ==
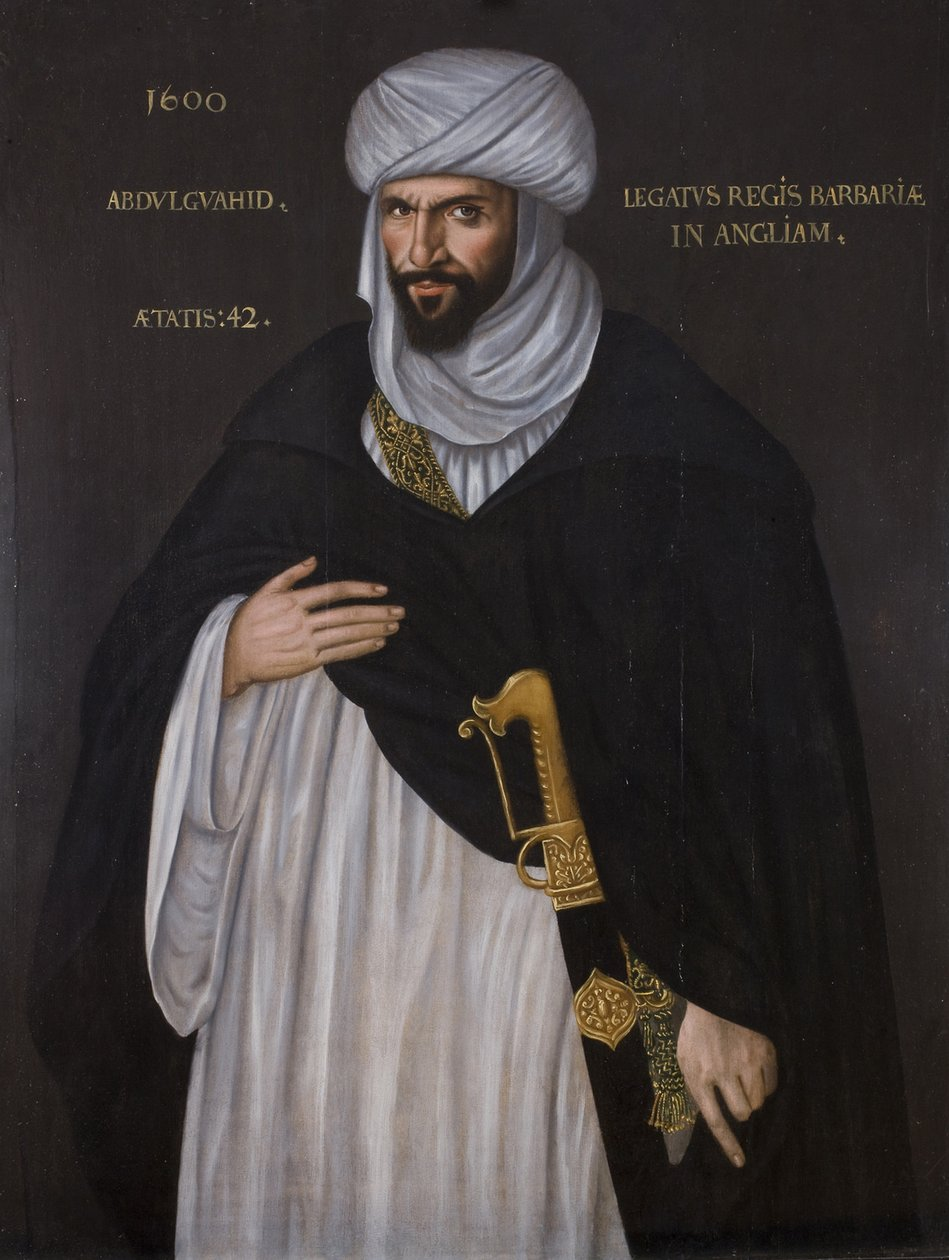
Abd el-Ouahed ben Messaoud was the Moroccan ambassador of Elizabeth I of England (1600).

=== 19th century ===
Great Britain and the Arab world have engaged in commercial activities with one another since the medieval times. Yemenis began to migrate to Britain since the 1860s via Aden, the main refuelling stop in the area, and settled around the docks in the port cities of Cardiff, Liverpool, South Shields, Hull, and London.

At the end of the 19th century, Yemenis working as stokers on steamships began moving ashore and set up boarding schools in the dock area. There are now an estimated 70,000 to 80,000 Yemenis in Britain.

=== Early 20th century ===
Iraqis began settling in London in the 1930s, and the UK has had a significant Iraqi population since the 1940s. Liberal and radical dissidents in the Kingdom of Iraq sought refuge to the UK at the time. Supporters of the monarchy later sought refuge in the UK after it was overthrown in 1958.

Arab migration to the United Kingdom began significantly in the 1940s and 1960s when Egyptians and Moroccans came in search of employment, and this generally increased as the Arab world wrestled for independence from European colonialism.

=== Late 20th and 21st centuries ===
The Palestinian exoduses of 1948 and 1967 saw an influx, and through the 70s and 80s. More Arabs arrived from the Gulf in the 1970s during the oil-boom era to set up businesses. Arab refugees also arrived as a result of conflicts in parts of the Arab world, such as the Lebanese civil war from 1975 to 1990 or the instability which followed the invasion of Iraq in 2003. The United Kingdom settled approximately 20,000 Syrian refugees amid the Syrian civil war.

== Demographics ==
British Arab population by region and country
Region / Country	2021 (Note: 2021/22: England and Wales, Scotland, and Northern Ireland)		2011 (Note: 2011: England and Wales, Scotland, and Northern Ireland)	
Region / Country	Number	%	Number	%
England	320,203	0.57%	220,985	0.42%
—Greater London	139,791	1.59%	106,020	1.30%
—North West	43,865	0.59%	24,528	0.35%
—West Midlands	31,790	0.53%	18,079	0.32%
—South East	29,574	0.32%	19,363	0.22%
—Yorkshire and the Humber	25,474	0.46%	21,340	0.40%
—East of England	15,639	0.25%	10,367	0.18%
—East Midlands	13,360	0.27%	9,746	0.21%
—North East	10,406	0.39%	5,850	0.23%
—South West	10,302	0.18%	5,692	0.11%
Scotland (Note: Scotland held its census a year later after the rest of the United Kingdom due to the COVID-19 pandemic. As a result, the data shown is for 2022 as opposed to 2021.)	22,304	0.41%	9,366	0.18%
Wales	11,641	0.37%	9,615	0.31%
Northern Ireland	1,817	0.10%	274	0.02%
United Kingdom	355,965	0.53%	240,240	0.38%

=== Population ===
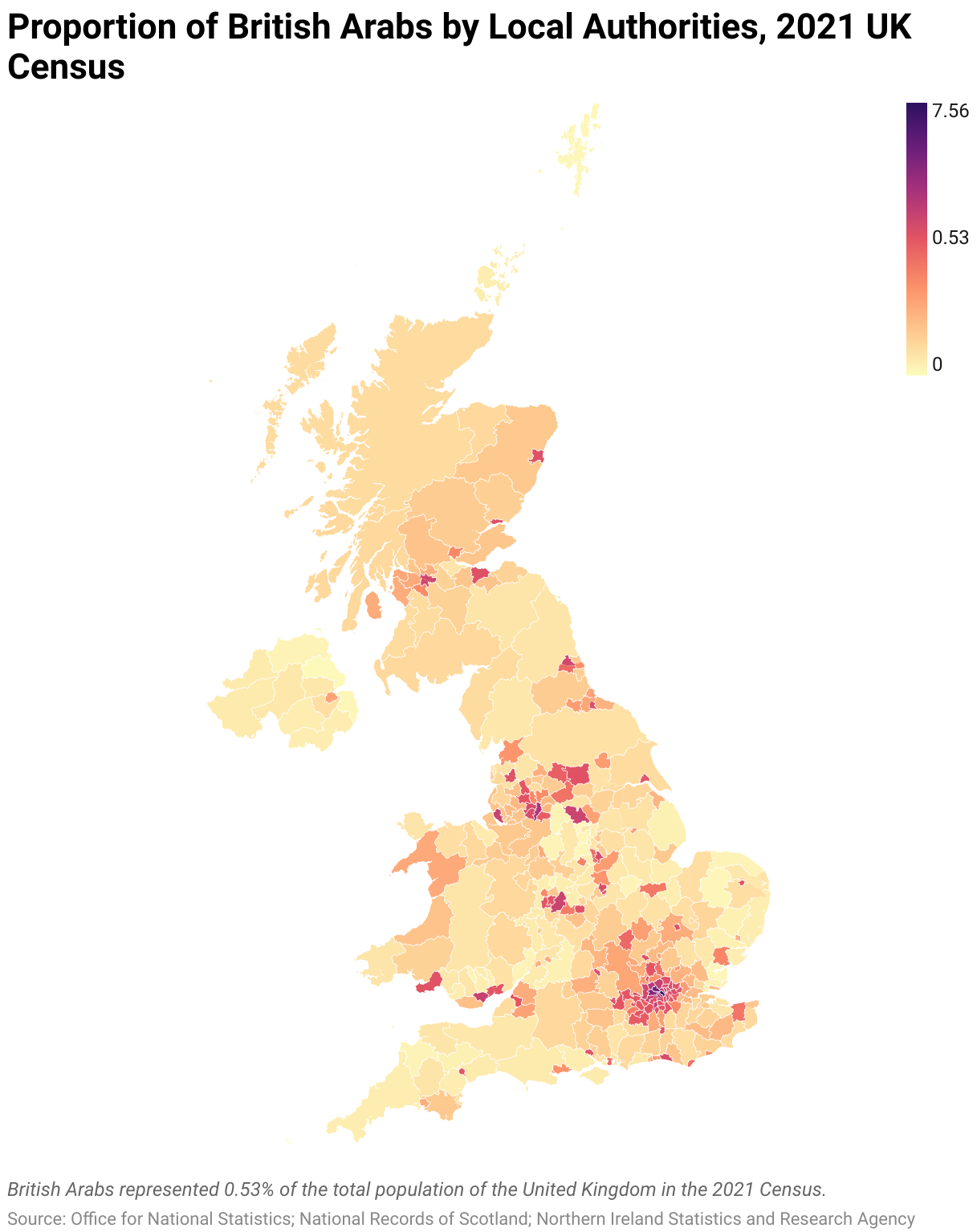
Distribution of British Arabs by local authority, 2021 census

Other: Arab ethnic group as a population pyramid in 2021 (in England and Wales)

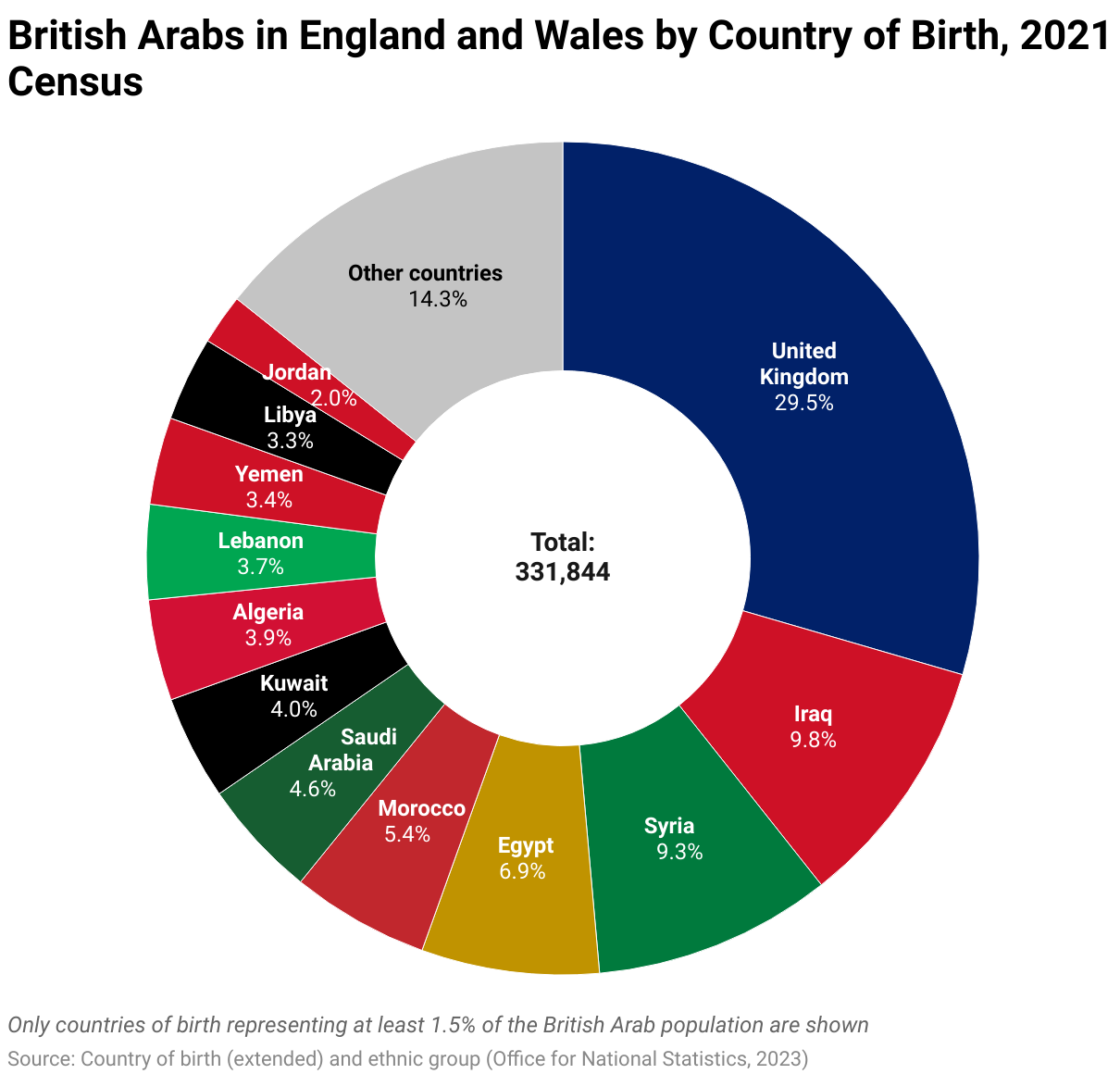
Country of birth (2021 census, England and Wales)

Year of arrival (2021 census, England and Wales)
1. Born in the UK (29.5%)
2. Before 1971 (0.70%)
3. 1971 to 1980 (2.20%)
4. 1981 to 1990 (4.10%)
5. 1991 to 2000 (9.00%)
6. 2001 to 2010 (14.1%)
7. 2011 to 2021 (40.4%)

The 2021 United Kingdom census recorded a population of 355,977 or 0.5% of the population in the United Kingdom. When broken down by country, England recorded 320,215 (0.6%), Wales recorded 11,641 (0.4%), and Northern Ireland recorded 1,817 (0.1%). The equivalent census was recorded a year later in Scotland with a population of 11,641, or 0.4% of the population. The ten local authorities with the largest proportion of British Arabs were largely concentrated in Greater London: Westminster (7.56%), Brent (5.27%), Kensington and Chelsea (4.45%), Ealing (4.39%), Hammersmith and Fulham (3.02%), Manchester (2.72%), Harrow (2.39%), Kingston upon Thames (2.13%), Camden (2.10%) and Barnet (1.90%). In Wales, the highest proportion was in Cardiff at 1.83%; in Scotland, the highest concentration was in Glasgow at 1.40%; and in Northern Ireland, the highest concentration was in Belfast at 0.29%.

Including both write-in and tick-box responses, 230,556 Arabs were recorded in the 2011 Census in England, 9,989 in Wales, and 9,366 in Scotland. In NABA's own report on the 2011 Census, it adds up answers from the write-in responses that it classifies as Arab, namely "Arab", "African Arab", "White and Arab", "Moroccan", "Algerian", “Egyptian”, "North African", "Other Middle East", or "White and North African", arguing that this gives a total of 366,769 Arabs in England and Wales but noting that there may be double-counting of individuals in this total, since it is uncertain how many of these individual write-in responses are also included in the general "Arab" category.

Most British Arabs live in the Greater London area, and many are either businesspeople, recent immigrants, or students. There are also sizable and long-established Yemeni Arab communities living in both Cardiff and the South Shields area near Newcastle-upon-Tyne.

Top 15 Areas (2021/22 Census)
Local authority	Population	Percentage
Birmingham	19,196	1.7%
Brent, London	17,924	5.3%
Ealing, London	16,105	4.4%
Westminster, London	15,439	7.6%
Manchester	15,028	2.7%
Sheffield	8,956	1.6%
Glasgow	8,671	1.4%
Liverpool	8,312	1.7%
Barnet, London	7,383	1.9%
Cardiff	6,624	1.8%
Kensington and Chelsea, London	6,384	4.5%
Harrow, London	6,239	2.4%
Leeds	5,980	0.7%
Hammersmith and Fulham, London	5,534	3.0%
Hounslow, London	5,461	1.9%

=== Religion ===
Religion	England and Wales			
Religion	2011		2021	
Religion	Number	%	Number	%
Islam	178,195	77.27%	277,737	83.70%
No religion	11,939	5.18%	15,963	4.81%
Christianity	21,988	9.54%	13,671	4.12%
Judaism	571	0.25%	425	0.13%
Buddhism	402	0.17%	129	0.04%
Hinduism	1,060	0.46%	103	0.03%
Sikhism	509	0.22%	82	0.02%
Other religions	859	0.37%	1,419	0.43%
Not Stated	15,077	6.54%	22,314	6.72%
Total	230,600	100%	331,843	100%

== Community ==
A diverse community, British Arabs are represented in the business and media fields, among other areas. Miladi's 2006 survey of 146 community members during the summer of 2001 reported Al-Jazeera as being the respondents' preferred news outlet. Reasons supplied for the selection included the quality of the station's programs and transmission, its discussion of current issues in the Arab world, and the possibility of giving voice to the community's concerns and positions on various matters.

Additionally, 2010 was a breakthrough year in terms of political participation. Several British Arabs ran for and/or were appointed to office as community representatives.

== Notable British Arabs ==
- Dennis W. Sciama (1926–1999), British physicist of Syrian descent who played a major role in developing British physics after the Second World War.
- Jim Al-Khalili (British Iraqi) Professor of Theoretical Physics, author, broadcaster, and presenter of science programmes on BBC radio and television.
- Zaha Hadid (British-Iraqi) architect who received the architectural award, the Stirling Prize, in 2010 and 2011, and was the first woman to receive the Pritzker Architecture Prize (in 2004).
- Ayman Asfari, Syrian-British billionaire, former CEO of Petrofac
- Ronald Mourad: Chairman of The Portland Trust and Bridges Ventures; his parents were originally from Aleppo, Syria.
- Lowkey, (British-Iraqi), musician
- Kefah Mokbel, (British-Syrian), breast surgeon and founder of the UK charity Breast Cancer Hope.
- Mustafa Suleyman, (British-Syrian), CEO of Microsoft AI and co-founder of DeepMind
- Alexander Siddig, (British-Sudanese), actor
- Ghassan Abu-Sittah (British-Palestinian), surgeon
- Potter Payper, (Algerian-British), singer and rapper.
- Rachid Harkouk, (Algerian-British), Footballer
- Zeinab Badawi, (British-Sudanese), journalist at BBC World (previously ITV and Channel 4 News).
- Shadia Mansour, (British-Palestinian), musician
- Nadia Sawalha, (British-Jordanian), television presenter, cook, and actress known for her role as Annie Palmer in EastEnders.
- Kamal El-Hajji, (British-Moroccan), Serjeant-at-Arms of the House of Commons (in 2015).
- Moe Sbihi (British-Moroccan), rower and twice Olympic medal winner.
- Saleem Haddad, writer
- Naseem Hamed, (British-Yemeni), professional boxer who held multiple featherweight world championships.
- Kaid Mohamed: (British-Yemeni) professional footballer.
- Norman Hassan: musician, member of UB40
- Isabella Hammad (British-Palestinian), writer
- Bilal Hasna (British-Palestinian), actor.
- Elyes Gabel, (British-Algerian), actor in Seasons 1 and 2 of the Game of Thrones.
- Faysal Bettache, (British-Algerian), professional footballer.
- Tarik O'Regan, (British-Algerian), composer and recipient of two British Composer Awards.
- Mika (singer), (British-Lebanese), singer and songwriter.
- Amal Clooney, (British-Lebanese) barrister specialising in international law and human rights, and special envoy on media freedom by the British Foreign and Commonwealth Office.
- Peter Medawar - (British-Lebanese Father), 1960 Nobel Prize winner in Medicine.
- Layla Michelle Moran, (British-Palestinian), member of Parliament, Liberal Democrat MP for Oxford West and Abingdon.
- Eugene Cotran, (British-Palestinian), Circuit judge in England.
- Jade Thirlwall, (Egyptian/Yemeni), musician, part of Little Mix.
- Adam El-Abd, (British-Egyptian), semi-professional footballer and played Egypt national team.
- Joe El-Abd, (British-Egyptian), rugby union player.
- Khalid Abdalla, (British-Egyptian), actor and activist from Maida Vale.
- Mike Bishay, (British-Egyptian), rugby league footballer of Greek and Sri Lankan descent.
- Ben Bland, (British-Egyptian), presenter and journalist for the BBC News of Lithuanian-Jewish and Russian-Jewish descent.
- Fady Elsayed, (British-Egyptian), actor.
- Abdel-Majed Abdel Bary, (British-Egyptian), former rapper
- Sara Ishaq: (British-Yemeni) filmmaker. Her short documentary Karama Has No Walls was nominated for an Academy Award (in 2014) and a BAFTA New Talent (in 2013).
- Ella Al-Shamahi: (British-Yemeni) biologist and comedian.
- Shatha Altowai: (British-Yemeni) visual artist
- Saber Bamatraf, (British-Yemeni) pianist, composer, and cultural activist.
- Abtisam Mohamed: (British-Yemeni) MP for Sheffield Central, first UK MP with Yemeni heritage.
- Amir El-Masry, (British-Egyptian), actor known for The Night Manager and Tom Clancy's Jack Ryan
- Magdi Yacoub (British-Egyptian) Cardiothoracic surgeon, carried out the UK's first heart and lung transplant in the 1980s.
- Layla Kaylif, (British-Emirati), singer
- Nemir Kirdar, Iraqi businessman

== See also ==
- Arab diaspora
- Arabs in Europe
  - Arabs in the Netherlands
  - Arabs in Sweden
  - Arabs in France
  - Arabs in Germany
- British Arab Commercial Bank
- List of British Muslims
