= Yemenis in the United Kingdom =

In History of UK

Total population
- 70,000 - 80,000; 0.13% of the UK's population

Regions with significant populations
- (England); South Shields, Birmingham, Sheffield, London, Liverpool, Hull, Middlesbrough, Manchester (Wales); Cardiff, Swansea, Newport

Languages
- Yemeni Arabic, British English

Religion
- Predominantly Islam; minority Judaism

Yemenis in the United Kingdom or Yemeni Britons include citizens and non-citizen immigrants in the United Kingdom of Yemeni ancestry, as well as their descendants. Yemenis have been present in the UK since at least the 1860s, with the first Yemenis arriving as sailors and dock workers in the port cities of Northern England and Wales, and despite a smaller population than other British Muslim groups, are likely the longest-established Muslim group in the United Kingdom, with many of these cities retaining a Yemeni population going back several generations.

== Demographics ==
The 2001 UK Census recorded 12,508 Yemeni-born people in the UK. Recent estimates are of 70,000 to 80,000 people, including British-born people of Yemeni descent.

According to the 2011 UK Census, a total of 18,053 people born in Yemen were residing in the UK: 16,921 were recorded in England, 853 in Wales, 245 in Scotland and 34 in Northern Ireland.

The National Association of British Arabs categorises Yemen-born immigrants as Arabs. Based on census data, it indicates that they are the seventh largest population of British Arabs by country of birth.

=== Communities ===
Main Yemeni communities in the UK
1=Birmingham, 2=Cardiff, 3=Hull, 4=Liverpool, 5=London, 6=Manchester, 7=Middlesbrough, 8=Newport, 9=Sheffield, 10=South Shields, 11=Swansea

Yemenis are present across the entire UK. Cities with large and notable Yemeni populations are:

- Birmingham
  The first immigrants arrived in the early 20th century, because they were offered work in the local metal-forming trades. However, as industry declined, unemployment rose in the city, and many Yemenis returned home. Despite this, Yemenis still have a strong presence in the city and have diversified by improving educational qualifications and setting up businesses. There are an estimated 10,000 Yemenis in Birmingham, about 1% of the city's population.
- Cardiff
  Yemeni seamen (Lascars) first arrived in the UK during the 19th century, with many settling in Cardiff among other areas to work in the docks and associated industries or on the railway. In the 1920s, an estimated 1,500 Yemenis lived in the city, making up half of its ethnic minority population. Between the 1940s and 1960s, Ali Salaman and his Welsh wife Olive ran the Cairo Café, a Yemeni restaurant that developed into a community centre, a mosque, and a boarding house. There are no reliable estimates of the present Yemeni-origin population of Cardiff.
- Hull
  Kingston upon Hull is also another port which saw the city's ethnic makeup drastically change in the early 20th century, although not to such an extent as in South Shields, Liverpool and the South Wales coast.
- Liverpool
  The first Yemenis arrived in Liverpool in the early 1900s, seamen and their families. The present Yemeni-origin population of Liverpool is not known, but an estimated 400 Yemeni-owned newsagents are in the city. The Liverpool Yemeni/Arabic Centre was established by locals in 1997. Most Arabs in Liverpool are of Yemeni origin.
- London
  Despite being the largest city in the UK and the home of the country's Yemeni embassy, it is unknown how many Yemenis live in London. Its Yemeni community is not as notable as other British locations. Many Jews of Yemenite descent live in NW London and Stamford Hill.
- Manchester
  Many Yemenis migrated to Manchester around the early 20th century, largely attracted to the city's growing industrial base. They are located across the whole city, but one of the most noted communities is Salford, where today at least 500 people are of Yemeni origin.
- Middlesbrough
  Middlesbrough is another industrial town that witnessed a significant number of Yemeni arrivals. The present Yemeni population is not known, but it is considerably smaller than the Yemeni population of the mid-1900s. This is due to decreasing industry, with many Yemenis either returning to Yemen or migrating to the Arab states of the Persian Gulf or the United States.
- Newport
  The Welsh port is home to a fairly large Yemeni community that consists of several generations. Many Yemenis came to the city to seek a better life.
- Sheffield
  One of the UK's largest Yemeni communities is located in Sheffield, one of the industrial cities that attracted immigrants to work in the many factories that were experiencing a stage of prosperity in the mid-1900s. Yemenis number between 3,500 and 9,000 in Sheffield.
- South Shields
  Although not the largest Yemeni community in the UK, South Shields is the most notable. A wave of Yemeni sailors came to the UK in the early 20th century, which makes it one of the newest communities. Despite this, the period between now and then has seen drastic change in the town. Muhammad Ali visited the local Yemeni Mosque and School in 1977. Today an estimated 1,000 - 3,000 people of Yemeni origin reside in the city (around 2% of the local population). For more information see South Shields' Yemeni community.
- Swansea
  Swansea is one of three Welsh, and seven British ports that saw a large number of Yemeni seamen arrive for work and better living prospects throughout the 20th century.

== Notable British-Yemenis or Yemenis residing in UK ==
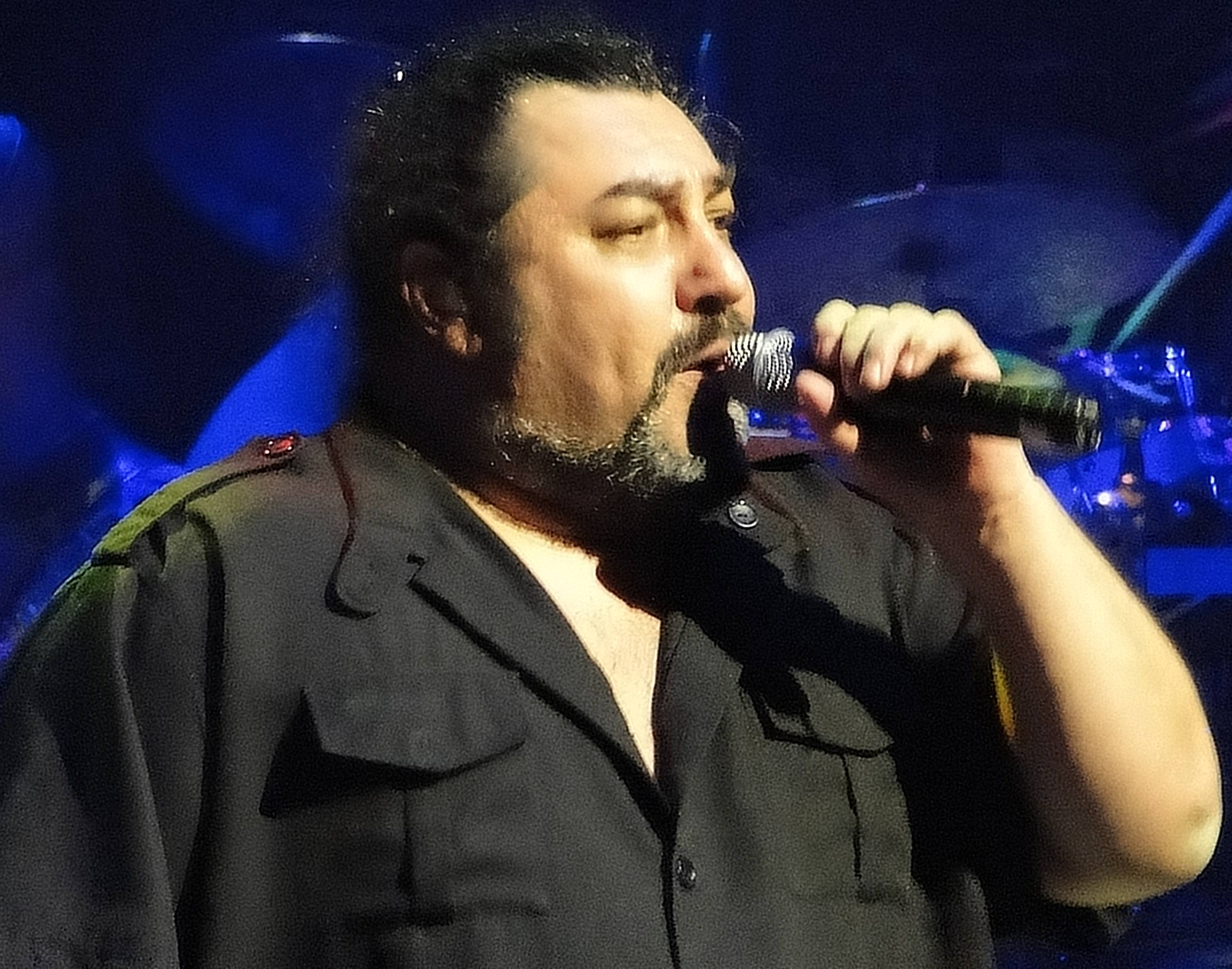
Norman Hassan with UB40, Birmingham Symphony Hall, 2010

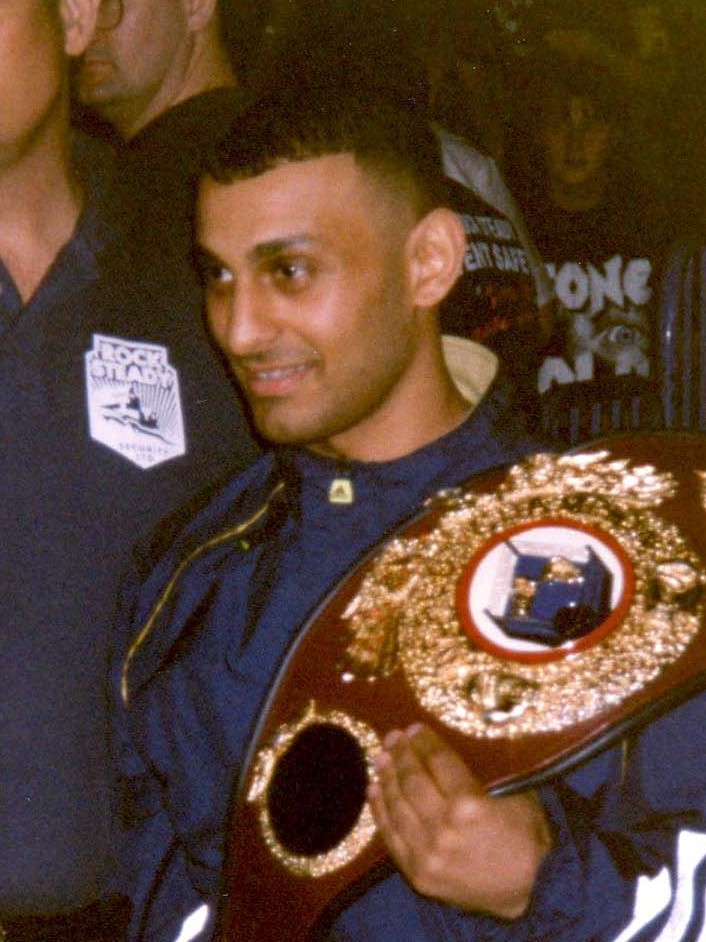
Naseem Hamed at a World Wrestling Federation event with his WBO World Featherweight Championship

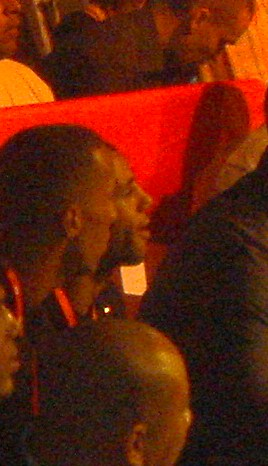
Khalid Saeed Yafai, the first British Under 17 World Boxing Champion

- Kazna Asker: fashion designer
- Bader Ben Hirsi: playwright and director
- Gamal Yafai: boxer
- Jade Thirlwall: singer, member of Little Mix (of Yemeni and Egyptian heritage)
- Kaid Mohamed: Welsh-Yemeni professional footballer.
- Naseem Hamed: boxer
- Norman Hassan: musician, member of UB40
- Khalid Saeed Yafai: boxer
- Sara Ishaq: Scottish-Yemeni filmmaker. Her short documentary Karama Has No Walls was nominated for an Academy Award (in 2014) and BAFTA New Talent (in 2013).
- Ella Al-Shamahi: biologist and comedian
- Intibint (Noha Al Maghafi): Yemeni-British singer, artist, and translator
- Shatha Altowai: visual artist
- Saber Bamatraf, Yemeni pianist, composer and cultural activist.
- Galal Yafai: boxer
- Abtisam Mohamed: MP for Sheffield Central, first UK MP with Yemeni heritage

== Associations ==
- Liverpool Arabic Centre
- Liverpool Arab Arts Festival (LAAF)
- Yemeni Community Association in Greater Manchester
- The Amanah Masjid (The Muath Trust), Birmingham
- Halesowen and Dudley Yemeni Community Association
- Yemeni Community Association in Sandwell
- Yemeni Community Association, London
- The Council for Arab-British Understanding(Caabu)

== See also ==
- United Kingdom-Yemen relations
- British Arabs
- Demographics of Yemen
- Yemeni community of South Shields
