= List of impact investing firms =

== Notable Firms ==
Below is a list of notable impact investing organizations.

| Name | Location | Year established | Partners or CEO | Industries and Investment Type | Assets under management |
|---|---|---|---|---|---|
| Bill & Melinda Gates Foundation’s Strategic Investment Fund | Seattle, Washington | 2009 | Andrew Farnum | Private Equity: health, development and education | $2,000M |
| Boston Common Asset Management | Bolton, Massachusetts | 2003 | Allyson McDonald | Private Equity: climate, sustainability, social | $5,000M |
| Bridges Fund Management | London, United Kingdom | 2002 | Michele Giddens, Ronald Mourad Cohen and Philip Newborough | Private Equity: health, skills, sustainability, social | $800M |
| Omidyar Network | California | 2004 | Pierre Omidyar, Pam Omidyar and Mike Kubzansky | Private Equity: social, technology, and human capital | $735M |
| Open Society Foundations’s Soros Economic Development Fund | New York, United States | 1997 | George Soros and Sean Hinton | Private Equity: development | $19000M |
| International Finance Corporation’s Investments | New York, United States | 1956 | Philippe Le Houérou | Private Equity: development, health and tech | $68000M |
| Actis Capital | London, United Kingdom | 2004 | Torbjorn Caesar | Private Equity: energy, infrastructure, and real estate | $9200M |
| LeapFrog Investments | South Africa | 2007 | Jim Roth and Andrew Kuper | Private Equity: financial services and health | $1600M |
| Blue Haven Initiative | Cambridge, Massachusetts | 2012 | Liesel Matthews and Ian Simmons | Private Equity: social and environment | $500M |
| Future Planet Capital | London, United Kingdom | 2015 | Douglas Hansen-Luke | Private Equity: Climate, Health, Education, Sustainable Growth and Security | $400M |
| Credit Suisse | Switzerland | 1856 | Marisa Drew | Private Equity | $1000M |
| Acumen | New York | 2001 | Jacqueline Novogratz | Private Equity: health, energy, financial inclusion, education, agriculture and real estate | $99M |
| United Nations Capital Development Fund | New York | 1996 | Judith Karl | Private Equity: development and financial inclusion | $7000M |
| Synthesis Capital | London, United Kingdom | 2020 | Costa Yiannoulis and Rosie Wardle | Private Equity: food technology and sustainability | $300M |
| BlueOrchard Finance Ltd | Zürich, Switzerland | 2001 | Philipp Müller | Private Debt, Listed Debt, Private Equity: development and financial inclusion, climate, education, women's empowerment, health, agriculture and sustainable infrastructure | $4500M |
| Yunus Social Business | Berlin, Germany | 2011 | Muhammad Yunus and Saskia Bruysten | Private Debt, Venture Philanthropy, Corporate Social Innovation | $20M |
| Quadria Capital | Singapore | 2012 | Abrar Mir and Dr. Amit Varma | Private Equity: Leading investor in Asian Healthcare | $2,900M |
| Quona Capital | Washington, DC | 2015 | Monica Brand Engel, Jonathan Whittle, Ganesh Rengaswamy | Private Equity: financial inclusion, fintech, embedded finance, cross-border payments, e-commerce, proptech, health – with focus on emerging markets: India and Southeast Asia, Latin America, Africa and the Middle East. | $750M |
