= Don Valley Stadium =

Football stadium in South Yorkshire, England

Coordinates: 53.396064°N 1.425798°W

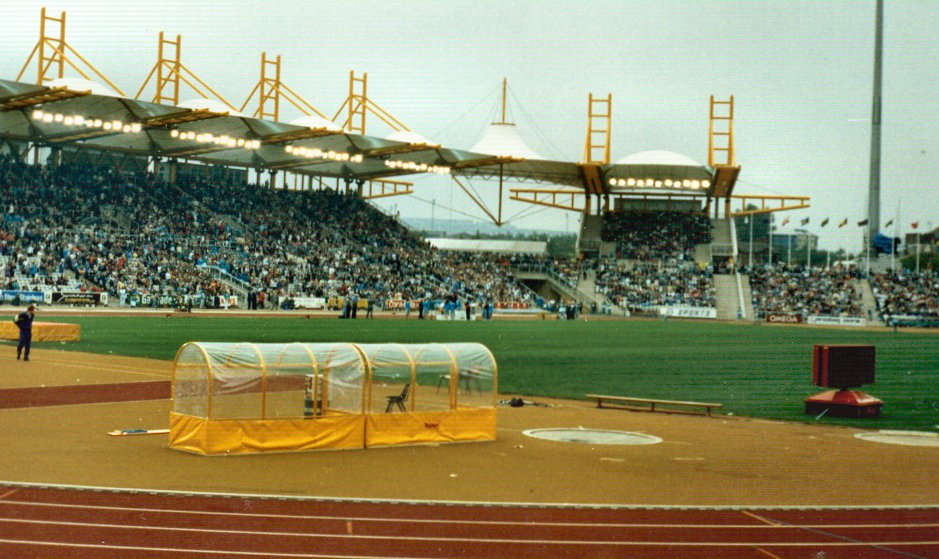
- Stadium c. 1990
- Interactive map of Don Valley Stadium
- Location: Worksop Road, Sheffield, England S9 3TL
- Owner: Sheffield City Trust
- Operator: Sheffield International Venues
- Capacity: 25,000 (50,000 for concerts) (10,000 for football)
- Surface: Grass
- Public transit: Y Arena / Don Valley Stadium

Construction
- Opened: September 1990
- Renovated: 2008
- Closed: 29 September 2013
- Demolished: 21 November 2013 – May 2014
- Cost: £29 million
- Architect: Sheffield City Council

Tenants
- City of Sheffield AC (1990-2013); Great Britain Spartans; Parramore Sports; BritBowl (2000–2007); Sheffield Eagles (1990-2010, 2011-2013); Rotherham United (2008–2012); Sheffield F.C.; (1990–2001)

Don Valley Stadium was a multi-sport stadium in Sheffield, South Yorkshire, England. It was constructed and first opened in 1990, and hosted the 1991 World Student Games. It was named after the nearby River Don. The stadium last closed down in September 2013 and was demolished between November 2013 and May 2014.

The stadium and facilities were also used for a variety of other events and sports. It served as a training base for the City of Sheffield Athletic Club and was the home of the Sheffield Half Marathon. It was the home ground of the Sheffield Eagles from 1991 to 2013. Rotherham United F.C. played their home matches at Don Valley between 2008 and 2012 when they were without a ground in Rotherham. American football was staged there and the Channel 4 celebrity sports show The Games also used the stadium.

To save money, Sheffield City Council closed the stadium in 2013. The site has since been sold and redeveloped to include a research centre, sports centre and educational facilities for local universities. At the time of its closure, Don Valley Stadium was the second largest athletics stadium in the UK, with a seated capacity of 25,000.

== Design ==
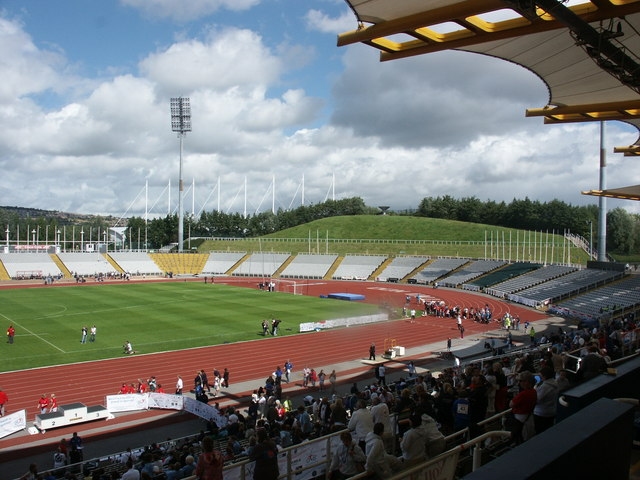
A view of the running track and surrounding seating

The whole of the running track and its infield was illuminated by the strongest floodlighting system in the country. Each of the five lighting towers used was 148 feet (45 metres) above track level and carried a lighting head as tall as a typical three storey house (36 feet; 11 metres high). All amenities for competitors and officials were at track level with all spectator facilities at natural ground level. This meant, for example, that disabled spectators had level access from the main car park straight through to the mid-level of spectator seating.

The track was sunk 16 feet (4.9 metres) below ground level and was sheltered by banks of spectator seating, creating a 'bowl effect'. This not only gave ideal viewing conditions but also offered athletes every opportunity of producing peak performances.

This record-breaking philosophy has even had a bearing on the angle at which the track was set and its positioning was relative to the prevailing winds and the rise and fall of the sun. The finishing line was positioned at the east end of the stadium which meant that in the afternoon and evening when most meetings are held the sun would always be at the athletes' backs in the finishing straight, as is the prevailing westerly wind.

VIP facilities were on a third level while the top-most of the four levels was set aside for hospitality boxes and press areas.

The stadium's major focal point was its grandstand which held 10,000 spectators. The main canopy roof had an area of 6,000 square metres and was made of Teflon coated glass fibre. It was supported by ladder masts reaching 39 feet (12 m) above the top of the grandstand, the latter were painted yellow and gave the stadium its unmistakable appearance. They also gave completely uninterrupted sight lines around the bowl although coverage from rain in the bottom half of the stand could be problematic. Underneath the main stand was located an 85 metres (93 yards) indoor running/warm-up track.

Up to 15,000 spectators could also be accommodated on the open terracing giving a seated capacity 25,000 for sports events. For musical performances the stadium could accommodate 15,000 seated guests, but had a maximum capacity of 50,000 if the field was used to accommodate standing fans.

The stadium was operated by Sheffield International Venues and owned by the Sheffield City Trust.

== History ==
=== Athletics ===
The Don Valley Stadium, which cost £29 million, was the first entirely new outdoor national sporting venue built in Great Britain since Wembley in the early 1920s when it was completed in September 1990. It was built as the centre-piece of a £147 million construction programme needed to provide the necessary sports and cultural facilities to enable the city to host the 1991 Summer Universiade.

Jan Železný threw a world record 95.66 metres (104.62 yd) in the javelin on 29 August 1993.

There were plans to use the stadium in a Sheffield bid for the 2002 Commonwealth Games (which eventually went to Manchester) and also to use it as a potential joint ground for the city's two football teams. In both of these eventualities the seated capacity would have been raised to 45,000. In addition when the British government cancelled the proposed Picketts Lock stadium in Edmonton, London which was to hold the 2005 World Championships in Athletics, UK Athletics suggested moving the host city to Sheffield using the Don Valley Stadium, but the IAAF stated that having London as the host city was central to Great Britain winning the bid to host the tournament. The championships bidding process was reopened as a result with the Helsinki Olympic Stadium in Helsinki, Finland hosting the 2005 World Athletics Championships.

=== Other sports ===
Football

Although Sheffield United and Sheffield Wednesday never played any first-team games there (although United sometimes used it for reserve team games), it was announced in June 2008 that Don Valley would host League football for the first time in the 2008–09 season. Rotherham United played their "home" league games at the stadium until the completion of the New York Stadium in 2012. There were questions raised about the agreement, and the Football League stipulated that the club was obligated to move back to Rotherham within four years.

Rotherham United fans were allocated the 10,000 seat main stand which includes concourse, bar and executive facilities including lounges and boxes. Away fans were allocated around 2,000 seats on the wing to the right of the home fans.

The first match Rotherham United played at the Don Valley was a pre-season friendly game against Derby County on 19 July 2008. The game finished 0–0. There were several friendlies held at the stadium before the start of the season.

The first official league match was a 1–0 win over Lincoln City on the opening day of the 2008–09 season.

Exeter City won promotion from Football League 2 there with a 1–0 victory over Rotherham United in May 2009.

Two Sheffield based football clubs played football at the stadium during its existence: the world's oldest football club, Sheffield, played at the Don Valley Stadium before their move to Dronfield and Sheffield Wednesday Ladies, who contested a Women's FA Cup game against Bristol Academy on 13 March 2016.

American Football

The stadium hosted BritBowl, the championship game of the British American Football Association Community Leagues in the United Kingdom between 1999 and 2007. The game is the most prestigious of the league's three annual bowl games. The London Olympians won five of the eight bowls held at Don Valley.

Rugby league

In 1991, the newly built Don Valley Stadium became home for Sheffield Eagles.

Sheffield was included on the schedule for a game against Australia during their 1994 Kangaroo tour of Great Britain and France and were beaten 80–2 in the first game following the first test match at Wembley. The Eagles had also played Australia in their mini 1992 Rugby League World Cup final tour at Don Valley, going down 52–22 to the eventual World Cup champions.

Sheffield Eagles became the first English team to beat an Australian team on English soil in the World Club Challenge in 1997 when they defeated the Perth Reds 26–22 on 15 June (it would be one of only 8 wins by Super League clubs in the 65 games played in the tournament). The club's record attendance was set in August 1997 when 10,603 spectators saw Sheffield play Bradford Bulls.

On 16 October 2009, the Eagles announced the club would be moving their home games from the start of the 2010 season to Bramall Lane, home of Sheffield United, in a bid to increase attendances and atmosphere.

The stadium also hosted the annual varsity rugby league game between Sheffield's two universities, the University of Sheffield and Sheffield Hallam University.

=== Music ===
The first concert to be held at the stadium was a Jason Donovan gig held in September 1990. Since then, a number of famous artists have performed at the venue;

Def Leppard played at the stadium on 6 June 1993, as part of their Adrenalize World Tour.

Bon Jovi played at the venue in June 1995 on their "These Days" tour. They were supported by Van Halen, Thunder and Crown of Thorns.

U2 played at this venue on 20 August 2009 with their 360° Tour in front of 49,955. The gig was broadcast live via Internet radio around the world.

The Rolling Stones performed at the stadium thrice. On 9 July 1995 as part of the Voodoo Lounge Tour, 6 June 1999 for the Bridges to Babylon Tour, and again on 27 August 2006 during the A Bigger Bang tour. The memorable part of the latter gig being a heavy rainstorm during the Stones' performance.

Tina Turner performed two sold-out concerts at the stadium during her Wildest Dreams Tour on 18 July 1996 (audience 51,500) and Twenty Four Seven Tour on 13 July 2000.

Red Hot Chili Peppers played at the stadium on 6 July 2006 as part of the Stadium Arcadium tour.

Michael Jackson performed a sell-out concert at the stadium on 9 July 1997, during his HIStory World Tour for an audience of 45,000 people. It was Jackson's first and only solo-performance in Sheffield.

Celine Dion performed for one night in front of 43,469 fans on 6 July 1999, during her Let's Talk About Love World Tour.

The Spice Girls performed two sell-out shows during their Spiceworld Tour on 11 and 12 September 1998. It was the group's first concert in Britain following Geri Halliwell leaving the group.

In 2011, the Arctic Monkeys hosted a two-day comeback festival at the adjacent Don Valley grass bowl to celebrate the release of Suck It and See. The band headlined and were supported on both days, by Miles Kane, The Vaccines, Dead Sons and Anna Calvi as well as local artists.

== Closure ==
Reports emerged in January 2013 that Labour Sheffield City Council were considering demolishing the stadium as part of a money-saving exercise. It was suggested that regional athletics competitions would move to the city's smaller Woodbourn Road Athletics Stadium, which closed in 2011. The nearest major athletics stadium would then be the South Leeds Stadium in Leeds. The council confirmed the closure of Don Valley Stadium on 11 January 2013. A final closure date of 30 September 2013 was set by Sheffield City Council in April of the same year and despite a petition signed by 5,922 people campaigning against the closure, plans were announced by Labour Party Councillor Isobel Bowler to start the demolition of the stadium on 21 November 2013. Demolition contractor Demex began the demolition on this date, estimating that the process would take approximately six months.

The Liberal Democrat Party leader and Deputy Prime Minister Nick Clegg opposed the stadium's closure, claiming the city council aimed to prevent the Save Don Valley Stadium group from obtaining central government grants in order to develop a business plan that would keep the venue open. The UK Independence Party also expressed opposition to the stadium's closure and stated their intention to put together a campaign to save the stadium. UKIP general secretary and Sheffield Branch chairman Jonathan Arnott commented that "there are so many examples of Council waste where cuts could and should be made without affecting local residents."

== Demolition and redevelopment ==
On 11 January 2013, Sheffield City Council announced that the stadium was to be closed and demolished as part of a £50 million budget-cutting measure. An eleventh hour meeting was held at Sheffield Town Hall on 1 March 2013. Local and national politicians met to discuss the proposed closure and any possibility of preventing it. A final decision was made that the stadium was to close in September 2013 and would be demolished from 21 November 2013. In October 2014, it was announced that the Olympic Legacy Park would be constructed on the site of the old Don Valley Stadium. It will contain an Advanced Wellbeing Research Centre, an indoor sports arena, a sports pitch and stadium to be home of the Sheffield Eagles, Oasis Academy and a University Technical College (UTC) backed by Sheffield College and Sheffield Hallam University.

Preceded by Wedaustadion; West Germany	Universiade venue 1991	Succeeded by Pilot Field; USA
