= Paul Blomfield =

British Labour politician

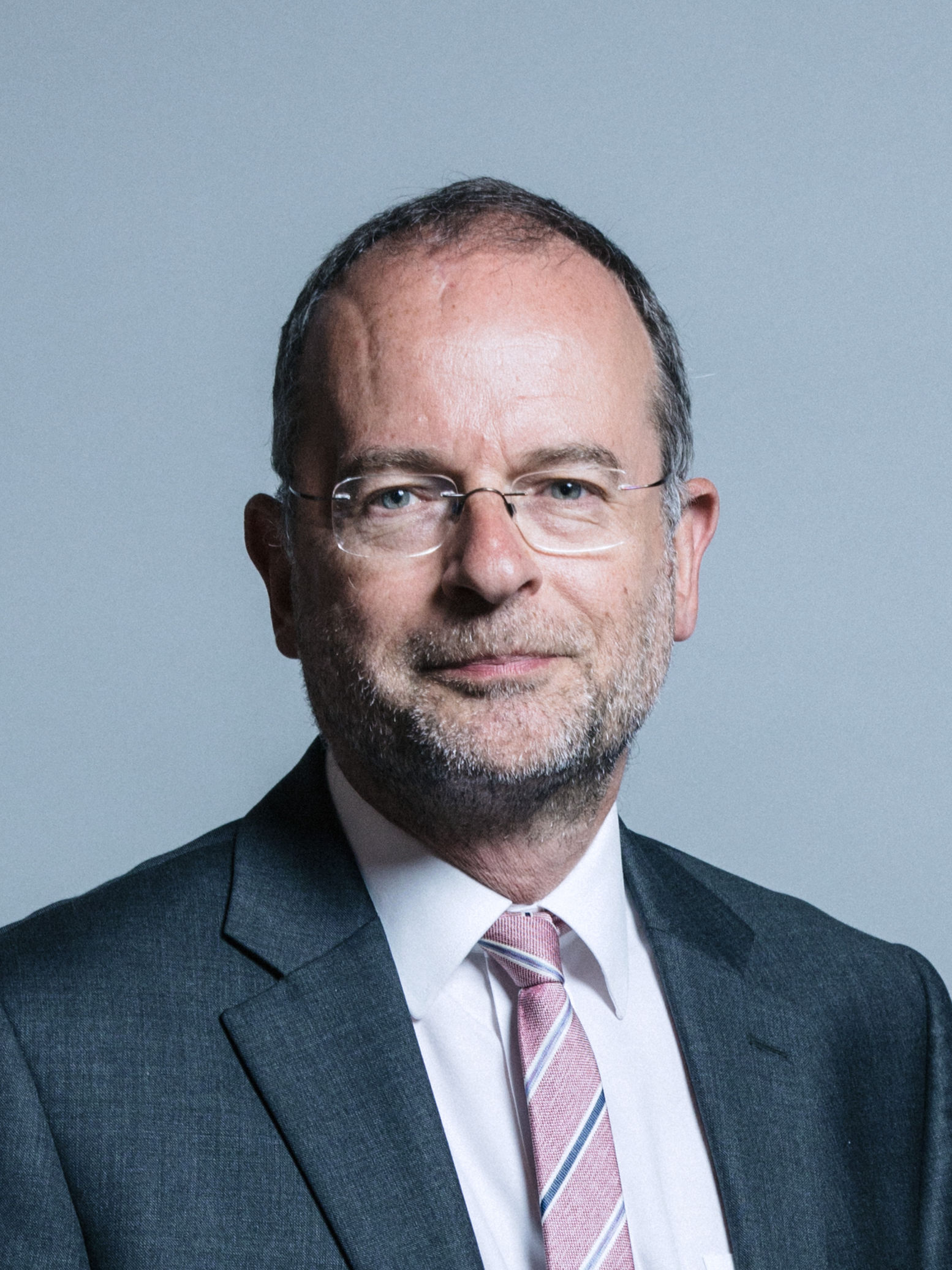
- Official portrait, 2017

Shadow Minister for Brexit and European Union Negotiations
- In office 10 April 2020 – 1 January 2021
- Leader: Keir Starmer
- Preceded by: Position established
- Succeeded by: Position abolished

Shadow Minister for Exiting the European Union
- In office 9 October 2016 – 10 April 2020
- Leader: Jeremy Corbyn
- Preceded by: Position established
- Succeeded by: Position abolished

Member of Parliament for Sheffield Central
- In office 6 May 2010 – 30 May 2024
- Preceded by: Richard Caborn
- Succeeded by: Abtisam Mohamed

Personal details
- Born: Paul Christopher Blomfield; 25 August 1953 (age 73) Chatham, Kent, England
- Party: Labour
- Spouse: Linda McAvan
- Education: St John's College, York
- Website: Official website

Paul Christopher Blomfield (born 25 August 1953) is a British politician who served as the Member of Parliament (MP) for Sheffield Central from 2010 to 2024. A member of the Labour Party, he was a Shadow Minister for Exiting the European Union from 2016 to 2020 and Shadow Minister for Brexit and European Union Negotiations from 2020 to 2021.

== Early life ==
Paul Christopher Blomfield was born in Chatham, Kent. He was educated at the Abbeydale Boys' Grammar School in Sheffield and Tadcaster Grammar School. He received a certificate in education from York St John University.

Anti-Apartheid Movement

He became involved in the Anti-Apartheid Movement while still at school and continued to organise Anti-Apartheid activity as a student politician. Twice President of the Students' Union at St John's College, York, Blomfield was also a member of the National Executive Committees of both the National Union of Students and the Anti-Apartheid Movement, the latter from 1979 to 1994. From 1997 to 2008, he was chairman of Sheffield City Trust; he was also the general manager of the University of Sheffield Students' Union. In 1976 he travelled to South Africa to meet local campaigners and learn about the apartheid system first hand. During this visit he was subject to surveillance by the South African Police and eventually decided to leave the country due to the risk this posed to the local anti-apartheid campaigners. He then went on to serve on the National Executive Committee of the Anti-Apartheid Movement from 1979 to 1994 when free elections were held in South Africa.

University of Sheffield Union of Students

As general manager of the University of Sheffield Union of Students, he was responsible for establishing and maintaining its position as one of the leading Students' Unions in the UK; it won a number of awards over recent years, including "Best Students' Union in the UK". He stepped down as general manager just before contesting the 2010 general election.

Sheffield City Trust

Blomfield was a trustee of Sheffield City Trust from 1994 to 1997, and its chairman from 1997 to 2008. In this role he was responsible for the development of Sheffield International Venues, Sheffield City Hall and the Sheffield Festival. During his tenure, he oversaw the organisation's expansion into venues such as Sheffield City Hall and the English Institute of Sport.

== Political career ==
Blomfield was the Chair of Sheffield District Labour Party from 1993 to 2009. He resigned the position to fight the Sheffield Central at the 2010 general election, after MP Richard Caborn announced he would be standing down.

=== Parliamentary career ===
At the 2010 general election, Paul Blomfield was elected as the MP for Sheffield Central. He retained his seat at the 2015 general election with a majority of 17,309 (his 2010 majority having been only 165). Blomfield was re-elected as the MP for Sheffield Central in the 2019 general election with a majority of 27,273 He announced in February 2022 that he would not stand at the 2024 general election.

==== Frontbench positions ====
Blomfield was appointed Parliamentary private secretary (PPS) to the Shadow Leader of the House of Commons, Hilary Benn, on 9 October 2010. He retained the role when Benn changed positions to become Shadow Communities and Local Government Secretary in January 2011 and Shadow Foreign Secretary in June 2015. Blomfield resigned as a PPS shortly after Benn was sacked from the shadow cabinet in June 2016.

He was appointed Shadow Minister for Exiting the European Union in October 2016. Following Keir Starmer's election as Labour Leader in April 2020, he retained his previous portfolio as Shadow Minister for Brexit and European Union Negotiations. The new position was in the shadow Cabinet Office and International Trade teams, and he departed the frontbench when the Brexit transition period ended in December 2020.

==== Committee and group memberships ====
Blomfield was elected to sit on the Business, Innovation and Skills (BIS) Select Committee between 2010 and 2016, and later became Secretary of the All-Party Parliamentary Group (APPG) on Higher Education.

He is Secretary of the APPG on Debt and Personal Finance. As Chair of the APPG on Migration, he was Vice Chair of a cross-party Parliamentary inquiry into immigration detention led by the Liberal Democrat MP Sarah Teather.

He is a Vice-Chair of the All-Party Parliamentary Group for Choice at the End of Life.

He is a member of Labour Friends of Palestine and the Middle East.

== Political positions ==
Blomfield has been a long-standing opponent of tuition fees but has been a supporter of a graduate tax. He is a supporter of proportional representation, and is the Chair of the Labour Campaign for Electoral Reform. Blomfield became the Chair of Labour for Democracy, or Labour4Democracy, on 4 December 2012. The internal party group was launched to promote plurality in the Labour Party, and increase co-operation with other political parties in building a "progressive consensus".

Labour Leadership Elections

Blomfield supported Ed Miliband in the 2010 Labour leadership election.

He supported Owen Smith in the failed attempt to replace Jeremy Corbyn in the 2016 Labour leadership election.

He nominated Keir Starmer in the Labour leadership election.

Assisted dying

His father, Harry, killed himself in 2014 at the age of 87 after being diagnosed with inoperable lung cancer. Since then he has been an outspoken advocate for a change in the law. He says the current rules on assisted dying robbed them of time together. Under the present law family and friends who help people to kill themselves - or even are aware of their plans - can be prosecuted.

== Personal life ==
Blomfield is married to Linda McAvan, a former Labour Member of the European Parliament for Yorkshire and the Humber.

=== Brain tumour ===
Blomfield underwent surgery to remove a benign brain tumour, a meningioma, in August 2011, going on to make a full recovery. This tumour could have been developing for 20 years. It was diagnosed when it began pressing against his optic nerve and interfering with his sight. He was diagnosed at the Royal Hallamshire Hospital within a week of noticing symptoms. The operation, by Mr Thomas Carroll lasted 13 hours and he was back at work after 4 weeks. He and Conservative MP Guy Opperman, who also had a brain tumour in 2011, walked the first section of the Pennine Way in 2012 to raise money for Headway UK.

Parliament of the United Kingdom
Preceded by Richard Caborn	Member of Parliament for Sheffield Central; 2010–2024	Succeeded by Abtisam Mohamed
