= Mokbel =

Mokbel is a surname. Notable people with the surname include:

- Dahlia Mokbel (born 1969), Egyptian swimmer
- Kefah Mokbel (born 1965), Syrian-born UK-based surgeon
- Tony Mokbel (born 1965), Australian criminal
