= Sheffield City Trust =

British charitable organization

Sheffield City Trust is a registered charity in the United Kingdom that used to own and/or manage fifteen entertainment and sports venues in Sheffield, South Yorkshire, England.

== Charitable objectives ==
The Trust was established in 1988 with three charitable objectives:

- provide recreational and other leisure facilities of a high standard and as economically as possible
- promote the physical health of the inhabitants of the City of Sheffield
- encouragement of the Arts, and the acquisition, preservation, restoration and maintenance of buildings of historical interest in Sheffield.

== Venues ==
The Trust used to operate a range of sports and entertainment venues:

=== Sports and leisure centres ===
- Westfield Sports Centre

The trust formerly managed Don Valley Stadium until its demolition.

As of January 2025, the sports and leisure venues are no longer managed by Sheffield City Trust, with Everyone Active taking over operations.

=== Entertainment venues ===
- Sheffield Arena (managed by Live Nation)
- Sheffield City Hall (managed on a 99-year lease from Sheffield City Council)

As of January 2025, both venues are no longer managed by Sheffield City Trust, with ASM Global taking over operations.

=== Golf courses ===
- Tapton Park Golf Club
- Sinfin Golf Club

As of January 2025, the golf venues are no longer managed by Sheffield City Trust, with Everyone Active taking over operations.

== Finance ==
The charity is funded via its three wholly owned subsidiaries, Sheffield International Venues Ltd, Sheffield City Hall Limited and Sheffield Festival Limited. In 2005–6 the Trust had an income of £56.7 million, expenditure of £55.8 million and held assets valued at £316 million. It is one of the 100 largest UK charitable organisations ranked by annual expenditure. The current chair of the Trust is David Grey, the previous chair was Howard Culley and before that (1997–2008) was Paul Blomfield.

Despite this, in recent times the trust has suffered financial problems and in 2022 received a £7 million lifeline from Sheffield City Council and agreed to hand back some of the major venues the trust manages.
