= Tomorrow (children's book) =

2012 book by Nadine Kaadan

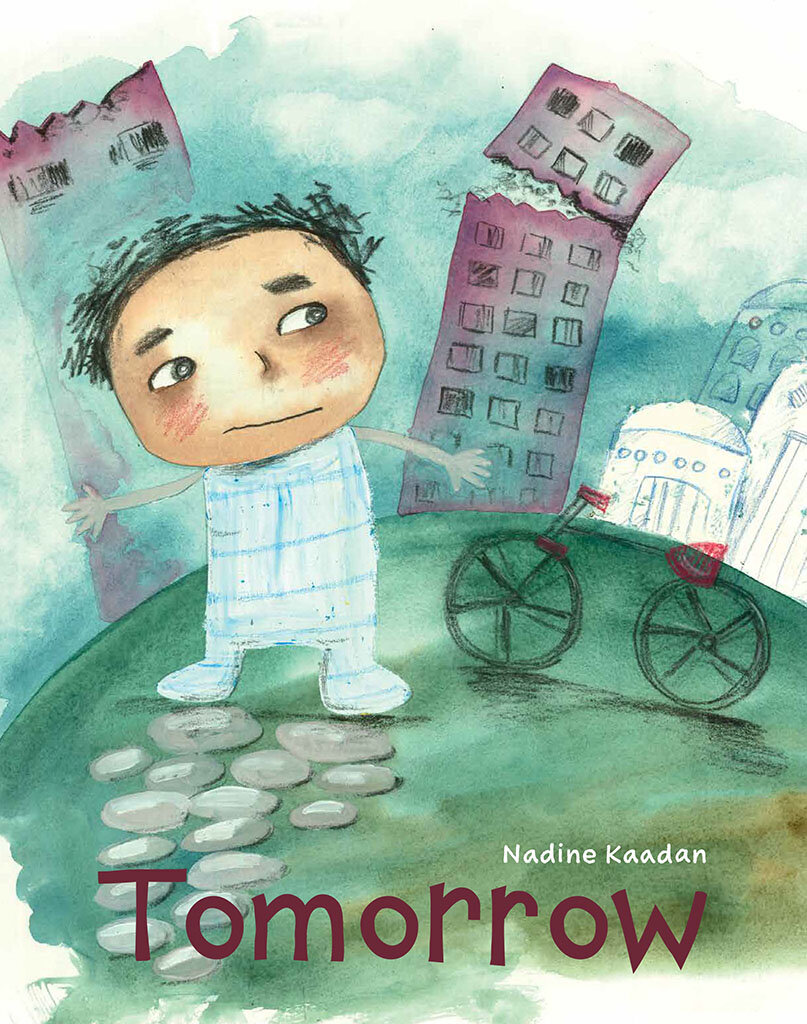
- Book cover of Tomorrow by Nadine Kaadan
- Author: Nadine Kaadan
- Illustrator: Nadine Kaadan
- Language: Arabic and English
- Genre: Children’s Picture Book
- Publisher: Lantana Publishing and Box of Tales Publishing House
- Publication date: 2018 (American Edition) and 2012 (Original)
- Publication place: Syria (Original) and United Kingdom (American Edition)
- Pages: 32
- ISBN: 978-1-911-37343-8

Tomorrow is a children's book written and illustrated by Syrian author Nadine Kaadan. It was originally published in 2012 by Box of Tales Publishing House (Arabic) and was later published in 2018 by Lantana Publishing (English). The story follows Yazan, a young boy living in Syria at the start of the Syrian civil war and the confusion and uncertainty of what is going on around him. Aware of the changes in his life, Yazan is frustrated and leaves his house without his parents knowing only to find the streets empty and filled with frightening sounds. He returns home and his mother explains that it is too dangerous outside, and he must not leave. Instead, they paint a park in his bedroom until he can go out again.

Written to help understand conflict, Kaadan reflects on her experience dealing with the Syrian crisis and her mission to empower children through "inclusive representation." Tomorrow not only helps children understand big emotions that come with conflict but exposes them to a world outside of their own. Her book has won several awards including the USBBY Outstanding International Book award, Sakura Medal longlist, Middle East Book Award honorable mention, and Little Rebels Award shortlist. Tomorrow continues to impact the lives of children living in and out of war as she travels across the UK and refugee camps to share Yazan’s story.

== Plot summary ==
The book follows the life of a young boy named Yazan and the confusing changes that are going on around him. He doesn't see his friends anymore, doesn't go to the park and doesn't even go to school. Yazan has become isolated within his house. Reminiscing on his happy memories of painting with his mother - the page is filled with cheerful bright red hues. However, his mother no longer paints and has become preoccupied by the news as dark looming shadows emerge from the TV and cover his home. Yazan feels stuck missing his old life, so he turns to different activities to keep him occupied throughout the day. Unable to escape his boredom, Yazan screams to his parents asking to go to the park but is ignored since the news is blaring showing pictures of war-torn buildings.

He then contemplates, looking at a big red door covered in broken buildings, whether or not he should take his red bike to the park himself. Deciding to walk out into the street, Yazan remarks again on the differences in his life: the streets are deserted and "frightening sounds explode all around." He is still considering what to do when he sees his father coming towards him. Yazan takes his hand expecting to be told off for leaving but they go back home in silence to be reunited with his worried Mother.

After asking him to never leave the house by himself again, Yazan’s Mother holds him in her arms against her red dress and goes to collect her paints. Painting across the walls of his bedroom, Yazan’s Mother explains that leaving the house is too dangerous since people are fighting in the streets. She cannot predict how long it will last but suggests that instead of going out, they could paint a colorful park filled with everything Yazan wants till it is safe for him to go outside and play again. Yazan rides his bike in the park painted in his room as he waits for tomorrow.

== Themes ==
=== War/Fear ===
War is a common theme emerging in children’s books as “Some children have lived with war all of their lives and deserve picture books in which they see themselves and their lives reflected”. Focused around the Syrian civil war, Tomorrow has brought forth a narrative to combat the fear and confusion that comes with war. Mostly linked to her illustrations, Kaadan utilizes shadows to represent the fear dominating Yazan’s life. As on pages 5–6, monster-like figures emerge from the TV and engulf the room in dark shadows as a representation of how war has taken over the media and consumed Yazan’s parents' attention. The news plays a huge part in the coverage of war, this is the first use of color to portray where children are subjected to it.

Yazan’s agency to then leave and go to the park exposes him to the effects of war and how it has changed his hometown. “Drenched in blood red hues,” Yazan stands amongst war-torn buildings. The spread on pages 16–17 pictures Yazan’s father coming to get him with his body rendered as one of the broken buildings. In war, children are not only exposed to violence and fear but also are witnessing the destruction of their home. According to Kaadan, she associates her hometown to a person and in witnessing the loss of the buildings around her (as a result of war) she is losing a piece of herself. Surrounding the images of security, fear, danger, and confusion, Tomorrow opens up the conversation of war and how it affects those who live within it.

=== Hope ===
According to Kirkus Reviews, Tomorrow eases any worries through the overarching lesson that “hope wins.” Hope can be found in the last few spreads of the book when Yazan comes to terms with the situation of his hometown. Through her illustrations, Kaadan uses bright red and yellow hues when Yazan and his mother paint a park on the last page. Contrasting her use of color from the beginning of the book (dark blues and grays), this is portraying the “light around the corner” and hope for a better tomorrow. Tomorrow exposes kids to the reality of not every story having a perfect ending; it is through the idea of hope and darkness coexisting together that the audience is able to come to terms with it. We see this with the recurring motif of Yazan and his red bike against dark buildings, his mother’s red dress, and the bright yellow window filled with red, light blue, and green drawings.

The theme of hope in Tomorrow is also heavily influenced by parental love. The idea that despite Yazan’s parents being consumed by war, they were able to come together and comfort their child - bringing hope through their efforts. As previously mentioned, Kaadan further explores this idea through color as the mother’s dress stands out in bright red. She is ultimately the one that comforts him saying, “Soon, you'll be able to go outside and play again” where as a motherly figure she brings the hope Yazan needed. Ending the book with the note, “we wait for a time when 'tomorrow' can be a better day for all Syrian children,” creating a bittersweet ending where darkness persists but hope prevails.
