= Ayman Asfari =

Syrian-British businessman

- أيمن أصفري
- Born: Ayman Asfari; 8 July 1958 (age 68); Syria
- Education: Villanova University; University of Pennsylvania (MBA, MS)
- Occupation: Businessman
- Title: CEO, Petrofac
- Term: 2002–2020
- Board member of: Petrofac
- Spouse: Sawsan Asfari
- Children: 4
- Website: www.aymanasfari.com

Ayman Asfari (born 8 July 1958) is a Syrian-British businessman. He was the chief executive (CEO) of Petrofac, a Jersey-registered multinational oilfield services company serving the oil, gas and energy production and processing industries, from 2002 to 2020, and became a non-executive director.

== Early life ==
Asfari was born in Syria, the son of a diplomat, but raised outside the country. His first job was in Oman, as a consulting engineer carrying out soil testing.

He is a graduate of Villanova University in Pennsylvania in the United States, and holds an MSc in Civil and Urban Engineering from the University of Pennsylvania. He attended the Wharton School of the University of Pennsylvania for his MBA.

== Career ==
Before joining Petrofac, Asfari served as the managing director of a major Oman-based civil and mechanical construction business. He joined Petrofac in 1991 when it had one plant in Tyler, Texas. He bought out the company in 2001, and took it public on the London Stock Exchange in 2005.

In February 2015, Forbes calculated Asfari's net worth at $1.2 billion. Asfari won the UK category of the Ernst & Young Entrepreneur of the Year Awards in 2011.

In 2019, Asfari's salary from Petrofac was cut by 45% to £980,000, down from £1.8 million in 2018. He stood down as CEO on 31 December 2020, and became a non-executive director in January 2021.

== Charity ==
The Asfari Foundation was established in 2006 by Ayman and Sawsan Asfari and is based in London. It is funded by the Asfari family and has five trustees. The foundation supports projects that encourage the development of civil society and provide emergency humanitarian relief, and also offers academic scholarships.

== Politics ==
In May 2017, Asfari and his wife donated £100,000 to the British Conservative Party election campaign, days before Asfari was scheduled to be interviewed by the Serious Fraud Office relating to its enquiry into Unaoil. In total Ayman and Sawsan Asfari donated £794,000 to the party between 2009 and 2017.

After the Fall of the Assad regime in Syria, Asfari praised the rebels and met with President Ahmed al-Sharaa in January 2025. Reports suggested that Asfari was a candidate for Prime Minister of Syria's technocratic transitional government.
