= The Second Bounce of the Ball =

The Second Bounce of the Ball: Turning Risk into Opportunity
- Front cover of the first edition
- Author: Ronald Cohen, Terry Ilott
- Language: English
- Subject: Entrepreneurship
- Publisher: Weidenfeld & Nicolson
- Publication date: 2007
- Media type: Paperback
- Pages: 352
- ISBN: 978-0297851486
- OCLC: 156890899

The Second Bounce of the Ball: Turning Risk into Opportunity is a non-fiction book about entrepreneurship, written by Sir Ronald Cohen and first published in 2007 by Weidenfeld & Nicolson, London. The book discusses what it takes to become a successful entrepreneur, and contains biographical anecdotes from the author and the company he founded, Apax Partners. The book's title comes from Cohen's incorrect belief that the second bounce of a ball is difficult to predict.

== Reviews ==
The book received positive reviews among the business literary critics. Robert Lenzner, editor of Forbes magazine, refers to Cohen as a modern-day version of Georges Doriot, one of the first American venture capitalists. In his review, he highlights the biographical aspect of the book, saying that it "is at bottom about how Cohen progressed from boutique investment banker earning fees on each transaction to the risky business of financing start-up companies, and from there to the more solidly rewarding buyout or private equity business."

Jonathan Guthrie, from the Financial Times, disagrees. He says that the book "is not an autobiography. But it is one of the best books written on entrepreneurship in recent years." In the review, he stated that some of the advice provided in the book can be found in other business self-help books, but says that Sir Ronald's "analysis of entrepreneurship is broader and subtler than in most titles."

== Publishing information ==
- Cohen, Ronald (November 2007). The Second Bounce of the Ball: Turning Risk into Opportunity. London: Weidefeld & Nicolson. ISBN 978-0-297-85148-6.
