= Michele Giddens =

Michele Giddens OBE is a leading figure in the social impact investment movement in the UK. She is chair of the UK National Advisory Board for Impact Investing. and co-founded Bridges Fund Management (formerly Bridges Ventures), a specialist sustainable and impact investment firm, alongside Philip Newborough and Sir Ronald Cohen, often described as "the father of British venture capital".

Prior to founding Bridges in 2002 alongside Philip Newborough and Sir Ronald Cohen, she spent a decade working in community and development finance with Shorebank Advisory Services and the World Bank Group. Since 2014, she has also served as a non-executive director of CDC Group, a development finance institution owned by the UK Government's Department for International Development.

In 2018, Michele was appointed an OBE for services to international development and social finance in the Queen's Birthday Honours list.

== Early life and career ==
Giddens studied at Oxford University, where she earned a BA in Politics, Philosophy and Economics, before completing an MBA at Georgetown University in Washington DC.

She subsequently worked as an Investment Officer with the International Finance Corporation, the private sector financing arm of the World Bank Group in Eastern Europe; here she worked on privatisations in Hungary and Poland, as well as small business lending programmes in Azerbaijan, Armenia, Georgia, Romania and Russia.

She then spent eight years with ShoreBank Advisory Services, the advisory arm of ShoreBank, a U.S.-based community development bank (now owned by Triodos), where she ran small business lending programmes in Russia, Central and Eastern Europe, advised on microfinance in Bangladesh, the Middle East and Mongolia and did research in the US community development finance sector.

== Bridges Fund Management ==
In 2000, Giddens was appointed as an adviser to the Social Investment Task Force, which was established by the UK government to “set out how entrepreneurial practices could be applied to obtain higher social and financial returns from social investment, to harness new talents and skills, to address economic regeneration and to unleash new sources of private and institutional investment.”

Here, Giddens worked alongside chairperson Sir Ronald Cohen, who has been described as “the father of venture capital”.

In 2002, Giddens, Cohen and Philip Newborough co-founded Bridges Fund Management, to invest private equity capital in entrepreneurial businesses in under-served areas in the UK.

Giddens continued to advise the Social Investment Task Force until 2010. She currently sits on the Responsible Investment Advisory Group of the British Private Equity & Venture Capital Association (BVCA).

In 2014, Giddens delivered the keynote speech at the BVCA's annual Summit, highlighting private equity's increasing interest in impact-driven businesses. She has previously argued in an interview with the BBC that there is a sea-change evident in the corporate world – that companies are realising that as well as making money, they also have a responsibility to the wider world.

== Other boards/affiliations ==
Michele currently serves as a non-executive director of CDC Group, the UK government-owned development finance institution.

Michele has previously chaired the BVCA's responsible investment committee and was appointed to the BVCA Council in 2016. She also chaired the Community Development Finance Association (CDFA) between 2003 and 2005.

She is the sister of Katy Marks, and the daughter of Jane Ellwood and Anthony Giddens, a British sociologist perhaps best known for his work on the Third Way.

== See also ==
- Sir Ronald Cohen
- Bridges Fund Management
