= Sheffield International Venues =

English facilities management company

SIV
- Type: Subsidiary
- Industry: Facilities Management
- Headquarters: Sheffield, United Kingdom
- Website: www.siv.org.uk

SIV (formerly known as Sheffield International Venues) was a facilities management company based in Sheffield, England that operated a number of sporting and entertainment facilities in that city. It was a fully owned subsidiary of the not-for-profit Sheffield City Trust, and served as its operational arm.

The facilities it operated included:

- English Institute of Sport Sheffield
- Hillsborough Leisure Centre
- iceSheffield
- Sheffield Arena
- Ponds Forge International Sports Centre
- Sheffield City Hall
- Tapton Park Golf Course
- Westfield Sports Centre
- Beauchief Golf Course
- Birley Wood Golf Course
- Concord Sports Centre
- Heeley Swimming Baths
- Springs Leisure Centre
- Tinsley Golf Course
