= Sheffield City Hall =

Listed building in Sheffield, England

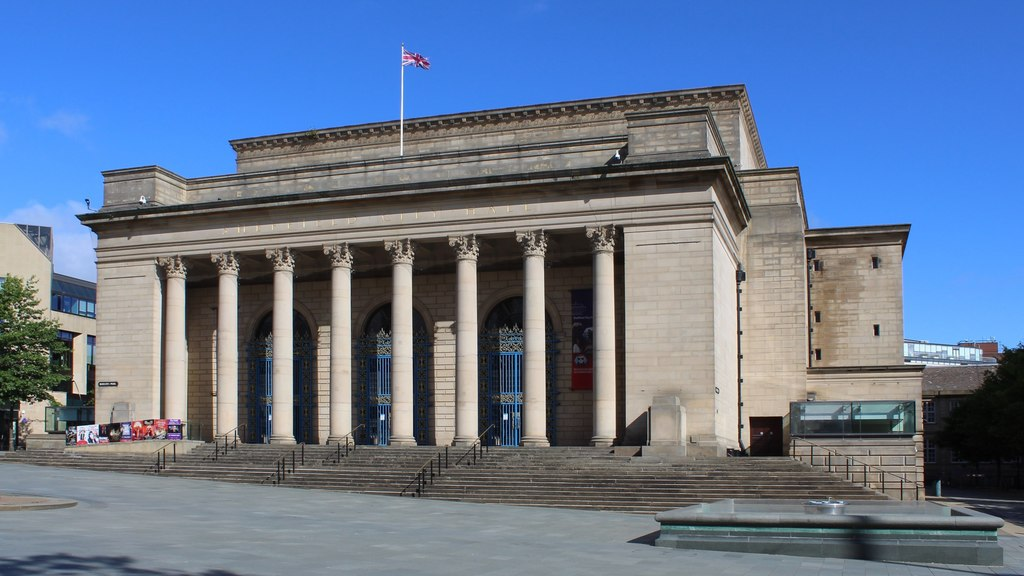

- Shown in South Yorkshire
- Address: Barkers Pool; Sheffield; England
- Coordinates: 53.3808°N 1.4724°W
- Operator: ASM Global
- Capacity: 2,271 (Irwin Mitchell Oval Hall); 850 (Ballroom); 500 (Memorial Hall)
- Designation: Grade II* listed building
- Public transit: B Y City Hall

Construction
- Opened: 22 September 1932
- Architect: E. Vincent Harris

Website
- www.sheffieldcityhall.co.uk

Listed Building – Grade II*
- Designated: 16 January 1981
- Reference no.: 1246548

Sheffield City Hall is a Grade II* listed building in Sheffield, England in Barker's Pool, one of the city's central squares. It was built and is owned by Sheffield City Council.

== History ==
The building was designed in 1920 by E. Vincent Harris but construction was delayed for 8 years because of the economic climate in the early 1920s. Eventually construction began with the laying of the foundation stone on 27 June 1929 and, after the works has been undertaken by the local contractor, George Longden & Son, the City Hall was officially opened on 22 September 1932. It was originally proposed in 1916 as a Memorial Hall to commemorate the dead of the Great War, but by the time of completion the name had changed to Sheffield City Hall, after some years of controversy.

During the Second World War, a bomb exploded in Barkers Pool, damaging the building's pillars. The scars of the explosion can still be seen. In 2005, the City Hall and its surroundings were refurbished and re-developed at a cost of £12.5 million.

The venue was previously managed by Sheffield City Trust under a 99-year lease. However, due to financial pressures, management of the venue was transferred to ASM Global in January 2025.

== Concerts and performers ==
In 1932 the famous violinist Yehudi Menuhin performed at the City Hall.

In the late 1940s and early 1950s the Hallé gave regular concerts on Saturday evenings. These "Hallé Concerts" were often conducted by the orchestra's principal conductor Sir John Barbirolli.

Other performers at the City Hall included the American singer/pianist Nat King Cole in April 1954 and the American singer/trumpeter, Louis Armstrong in March 1959. The Beatles performed in March/May 1963 and November 1964.

Later performers have included the progressive rock band, The Nice, in 1969, the singer/pianist/composer, Elton John, in December 1971, the rock band Bon Jovi in November 1986, the electronic band Kraftwerk in July 1991, the singer, Kylie Minogue, in November 1991 and the mezzo-soprano, Katherine Jenkins in January 2012.

== Other events ==
In June 1934, Oswald Mosley and the British Union of Fascists held a rally in the Hall. In April 1951 Winston Churchill was awarded the Freedom of the City in the Hall.

== Architecture and features ==
It is a building in the neo-classical style with a giant portico. The Oval Hall is the largest hall in the building, seating 2,271 people. The Grand Willis III Organ is the largest in Sheffield with over 4,037 pipes, 75 stops and four manuals. The organ sits in a chamber situated behind the large decorative grilles facing the audience. In addition to the Oval Hall, facilities include the Memorial Hall with capacity to seat 425 people and the Ballroom with capacity to seat 400 people.

A pair of four-foot high stone Art Deco lions, designed by John Hodge and each weighing 2.5 tonnes, stood at either side of the stage when the main hall first opened in 1932. They were removed in 1962 as part of a refurbishment of the City Hall, apparently because the conductor Sir Thomas Beecham, found them distracting. They were acquired by Tarmac Group for use at their offices at John Hadfield House in Matlock and later removed to their offices in Ettingshall (a district of Wolverhampton) in 1997 before being returned to the foyer of the City Hall, as part of the building's 85th anniversary celebrations, in October 2017.
