= Kazna Asker =

British fashion designer (born 1997)

- Born: 9 January 1997 (age 29); Fazakerley, Liverpool, England
- Education: Manchester School of Art (BA); Central Saint Martins (MA)
- Occupation: Fashion designer
- Years active: 2022–present
- Family: Abtisam Mohamed (aunt)
- Website: kaznaasker.com

Kazna Asker (born 1997) is an English fashion designer. She won the Franca Sozzani Debut Talent Award at the 2022 Fashion Trust Arabia. A member of the British Fashion Council's NewGen programme, she has presented collections at London Fashion Week and Lakmé Fashion Week. At her February 2026 London Fashion Week presentation, held during Ramadan, she paused the show at sunset to break the fast with the models, staff, and guests.

== Early life and education ==
Asker was born the eldest of four in Fazakerley, Liverpool to Yemeni parents. When she was 12, the family moved to Sheffield, settling in the Burngreave neighbourhood, home to a large Yemeni community. Her father is a postmaster, while her mother is a primary school headteacher. Asker's aunt is the Labour politician Abtisam Mohamed, who introduced her to politics at a young age.

After completing an Art Foundation in 2017, Asker went on to graduate with a Bachelor of Arts (BA) in Fashion Design from the Manchester School of Art in 2019 and a Master of Arts (MA) from Central Saint Martins in 2022. Her graduating collection Watered by One Water was the first to feature a hijab in the CSM Ready-to-Wear AW22 fashion show.

== Career ==
That autumn, Asker won the Franca Sozzani Debut Talent Award at the 2022 Fashion Trust Arabia. She was selected for the British Fashion Council's NewGen initiative. She was retained on the NewGen roster for 2025/26.

At age 26, Asker made her London Fashion Week (LFW) debut in 2023. At the presentation, she screened a short film titled Fight For Me, Sheffield. Asker represented Kindness in Kurt Geiger's 2023 People's Empowerment campaign.

Asker returned to London Fashion Week to present her AW24 and AW25 collections, titled What Are We Fighting For? and Family respectively. The AW24 presentation recreated her grandmother's living room. She also did a presentation at the 2025 Lakmé Fashion Week in India. Asker appeared on the 2024 Dazed 100 MENA list. In September 2025, in place of a runway show, Asker held a two-day souk with Tank magazine as part of London Fashion Week's City Wide Celebration; the stalls featured businesses and creatives from South West Asia and North Africa, including Palestinian embroidery and Sudanese soap.

On 23 February 2026, Asker presented her AW26 collection, Hour of the Sunset, at the NewGen space at 180 Strand, her final season showing as part of the initiative. With London Fashion Week coinciding with Ramadan for the first time since 2009, the presentation paused at sunset for iftar, the meal marking the breaking of the fast, which Asker shared with her models, staff, and guests. The writer Yassmin Abdel-Magied opened the breaking of the fast by reciting a poem. The collection used fabrics Asker had collected while travelling in Egypt, Qatar, Saudi Arabia, Oman, India, and Zimbabwe, and included abayas, kaftans, and veils. Models wore mashadas, the traditional headscarves of Yemeni men, as well as headgear made with British milliner Lucy Barlow that emulated the madhalla, the conical straw hat worn by Yemeni women.

== Artistry ==
Asker is known for fusing the influences of her Yemeni background with those of her Northern English upbringing. This includes designing jilbab, abaya and thobe using waterproof nylon and zippers, as well as upcycling deadstock tracksuits, jackets and other sportswear with Middle Eastern textiles. Each garment is handsewn in her London studio from upcycled and repurposed fabrics. Her guiding principle, she has said, is "build sideways, not upwards".
