= Yasmin Hayat =

Visual artist

- Born: Yasmin Hayat Maksousa; February 1990 (age 36); Bournemouth, England
- Education: Central Saint Martins; Prince's Foundation School of Arts
- Years active: 2012–present
- Website: www.yasminhayat.com

Yasmin Hayat Maksousa (born February 1990) is an English visual artist who specialises in miniature painting and ceramics. She won the 2018 Kairos Award and was named was named a 2022 Homes & Gardens star of tomorrow.

== Early life and education ==
Hayat was born to an English mother and a Syrian father and grew up in Bournemouth. She took triple art as a school subject, in addition to lessons with an art tutor. Hayat graduated from Central Saint Martins in 2013 with a Bachelor of Arts (BA) in Painting. She later completed a Master of Arts (MA) at the Prince's Foundation School in 2018, where she specialised in Islamic art and architecture, miniature painting, and geometry.

== Career ==
In 2018, Hayat received the Kairos Award from King Charles III (then Prince Charles) and Keith Critchlow for her traditional Indo-Persian and Arabic miniature painting techniques. Thematically, Hayat's art draws upon her Syrian heritage and combines these techniques with western methods.

In 2020, London's Aga Khan Centre Gallery commissioned Iznik-style ceramic plates from Hayat for a 2021 group exhibition titled Making Paradise. Hayat started working with Lulu Lytle of Soane Britain, leading to a 2022 collaboration between Hayat and Soane on a linen and wallpaper collection titled Rumi for the company's Egyptomania series. Hayat was named a 2022 Homes & Gardens star of tomorrow.

Hayat had her first solo exhibition titled Yasmin Hayat: Timeless Vision with Jonathan Cooper in late 2023. The following year, she began exhibiting in India, taking part in Musawwari: Miniatures Today at the Ojas Art Gallery in New Delhi and Land that Lives through Us at Art and Charlie in Mumbai. Hayat also returned to the Aga Khan Centre Gallery for The Quran: Form, Fragrance & Feeling.

== Collections ==
- Rumi (part of Egyptomania, 2022), linen and wallpaper line for Soane Britain

== Exhibitions ==
=== Group ===
- Carpet Pages II: Roots (2019), the Art Pavilion, Mile End Park (London)
- Making Paradise (2021), Aga Khan Centre Gallery (London)
- Spotlight on Exceptional New Talents (2022), Jonathan Cooper (London)
- The Miniature Show (2022–2023), Jonathan Cooper (London)
- Musawwari: Miniatures Today (2024), Ojas Art Gallery (New Delhi)
- The Quran: Form, Fragrance & Feeling (2024), Aga Khan Centre Gallery (London)
- Land that Lives through Us (2025), Art and Charlie (Mumbai)

=== Solo ===
- Yasmin Hayat: Timeless Vision (2023–2024), Jonathan Cooper (London)
