= Nadine Kaadan =

Syrian-British children's book illustrator and writer

Nadine Kaadan (born 1985) is a Syrian children's book illustrator and writer living in London.

She has published 15 books, including stories celebrating the Arab world.

Her mission is to champion empowered and inclusive representation in children’s books so that every child can see themselves in a story.

She is a member of the International Board on Books for Young People (IBBY). Her illustrations have been exhibited at the BIB exhibition (Biennale of illustration Bratislava 2011).

In 2021, Nadine was commissioned by The Story Museum to be the writer of Amal Meets Alice, a procession event in Oxford

== Early life and education ==
Nadine was born in Paris, France.

She graduated in the Faculty of Fine Arts of Damascus and acquired two Masters, one in Illustration at Kingston University, and another in Art and Politics at Goldsmiths, University of London.

== Awards ==
- Kaadan was on the list of the BBC's 100 Women announced on 23 November 2020.
- "Leila Answer Me" (2011) Winner Anna Lindh Award (the Best Fiction Book for children with special needs),
- "Tomorrow" (2019) nominee Kate Greenaway Medal
- "Tomorrow" (2019) nominee The Little Rebels Children's Book Awards
