= Abtisam Mohamed =

Yemeni-British politician (born 1980)

Abtisam Mohamed MP
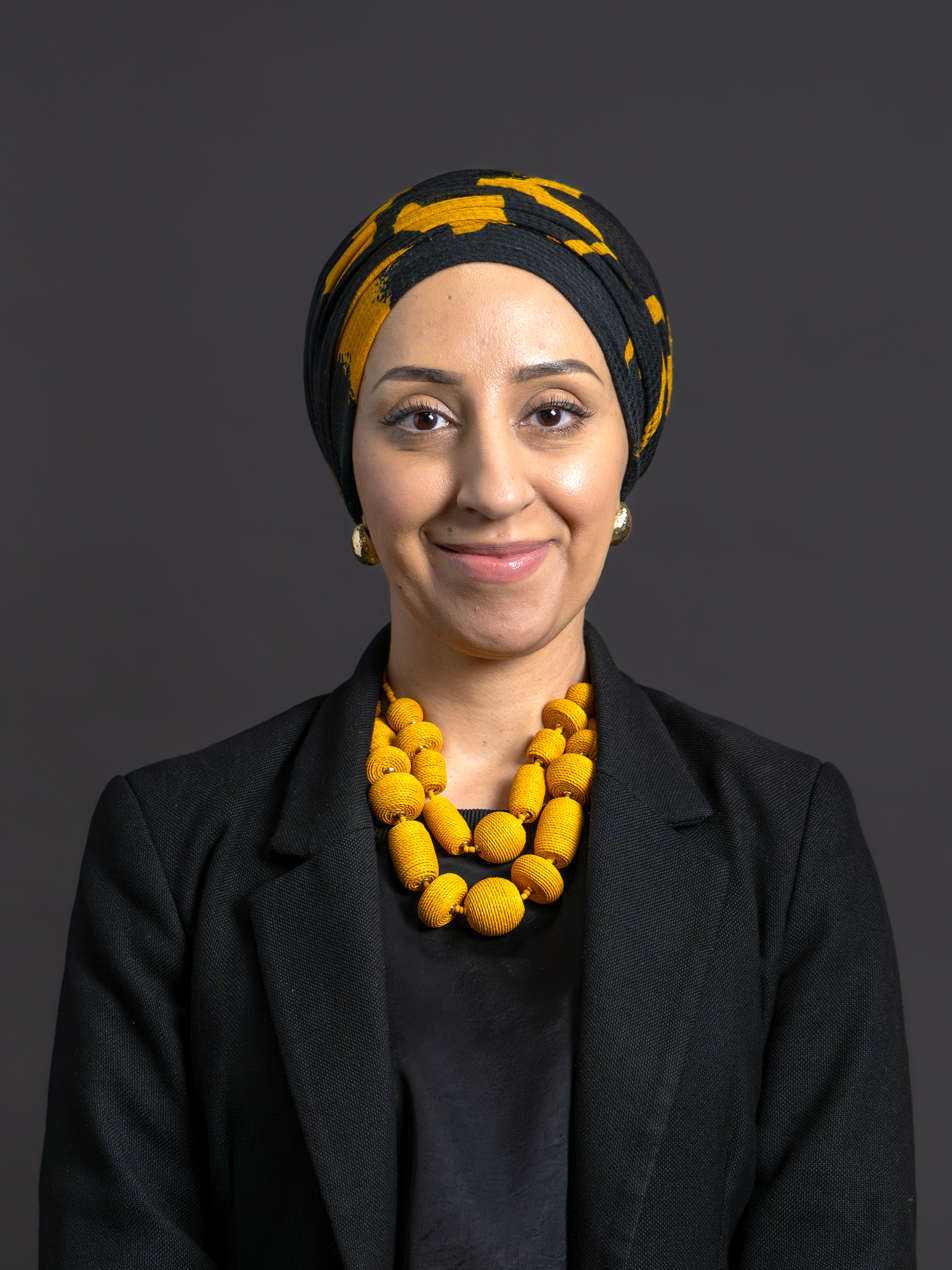
- Official portrait, 2026

Member of Parliament for Sheffield Central
- Incumbent
- Assumed office 4 July 2024
- Preceded by: Paul Blomfield
- Majority: 8,286 (26.1%)

Member of Sheffield City Council for Firth Park
- In office 5 May 2016 – 2 May 2024

Personal details
- Born: May 1980 (age 46) Yemen
- Party: Labour
- Education: Sheffield Hallam University (BA); University of Sheffield (LLM)
- Occupation: Politician; solicitor
- Website: Official website

Abtisam Mohamed (Arabic: ابتسام محمد; born May 1980) is a Yemeni-British politician. A member of the Labour Party she has been a Member of Parliament (MP) for Sheffield Central since 2024. She is the first Arab woman and first Yemeni person to be elected as a British MP.

== Early life and career ==
Mohamed was born in Yemen. She was the second of eight children. In 1982 she moved with her mother and sister to the UK to join her father and grandfather, who were working in the steel industry in Sheffield.

Mohamed qualified as a teacher, studying education at the Sheffield Hallam University, and then studied law at the University of Sheffield where she qualified to become a lawyer.

Mohamed ran a legal practice in human rights and immigration, which she closed following her election in 2024 (in line with Labour party policy for its MPs). She still owns over 15% of issued share capital in Crater Law Solicitors Ltd, an immigration law firm based in Sheffield, South Yorkshire.

== Political career ==
=== Local politics ===
Mohamed started her political career as a grassroots activist engaged in community work in areas ranging from mental health to youth activities and social support for the elderly. She campaigned against the closure of public services. In 2016, Mohamed was elected councillor for the Firth Park ward on the Sheffield City Council.

=== Parliamentary career ===
In 2022, Mohamed was selected to replace the MP Paul Blomfield, who was stepping down. She secured the endorsement of the Labour party over other candidates including comedian Eddie Izzard. She subsequently won the parliamentary elections for Sheffield Central in 2024, beating the Green Party and Conservative candidates.

Mohamed criticised property management companies for increasing fees for leaseholders; her action contributed to the debate on affordable housing in the country.

In 2024, Mohamed campaigned for reinstalling parking meters at Broomhill car park in Sheffield after a change of policy by the private firm operating the meters left business customers with large parking bills.

Mohamed believes that the impact of climate change and the climate crisis should be considered in British government decisions.

==== Foreign affairs ====
During her electoral campaign, Mohamed called for an immediate ceasefire in Gaza and for a release of hostages and prisoners on both sides. In 2024, Mohamed was appointed a member of the Foreign Affairs Committee of the House of Commons. In her role, Mohamed condemned sexual and gender-based violence against Palestinians in the Gaza war.

Mohamed was appointed by Prime Minister Keir Starmer to the UK delegation to the UK-EU Parliamentary Partnership Assembly.

In April 2025, Mohamed was detained, questioned, and denied entry into Israel, alongside fellow Labour MP Yuan Yang and their two aides, travelling as part of a Parliamentary delegation, according to the UK Foreign Office. This was disputed by Israel's population and immigration ministry, which said the two politicians arrived to "document the security forces and spread hate speech against Israel" and that the delegation was not acknowledged by any Israeli official. Mohamed and Yang said in a joint statement that they had been planning to visit humanitarian aid projects and communities in the occupied West Bank and were astounded at the Israeli decision to bar them from entry, and insisted that it was vital that UK parliamentarians were able to witness first-hand the situation in the occupied Palestinian territory. Foreign Secretary David Lammy branded the Israeli action as "unacceptable, counter-productive and deeply concerning".

== Personal life ==
Mohamed's niece is the fashion designer Kazna Asker.

Parliament of the United Kingdom
Preceded by Paul Blomfield	Member of Parliament for Sheffield Central; 2024–present	Incumbent
