= Layla Kaylif =

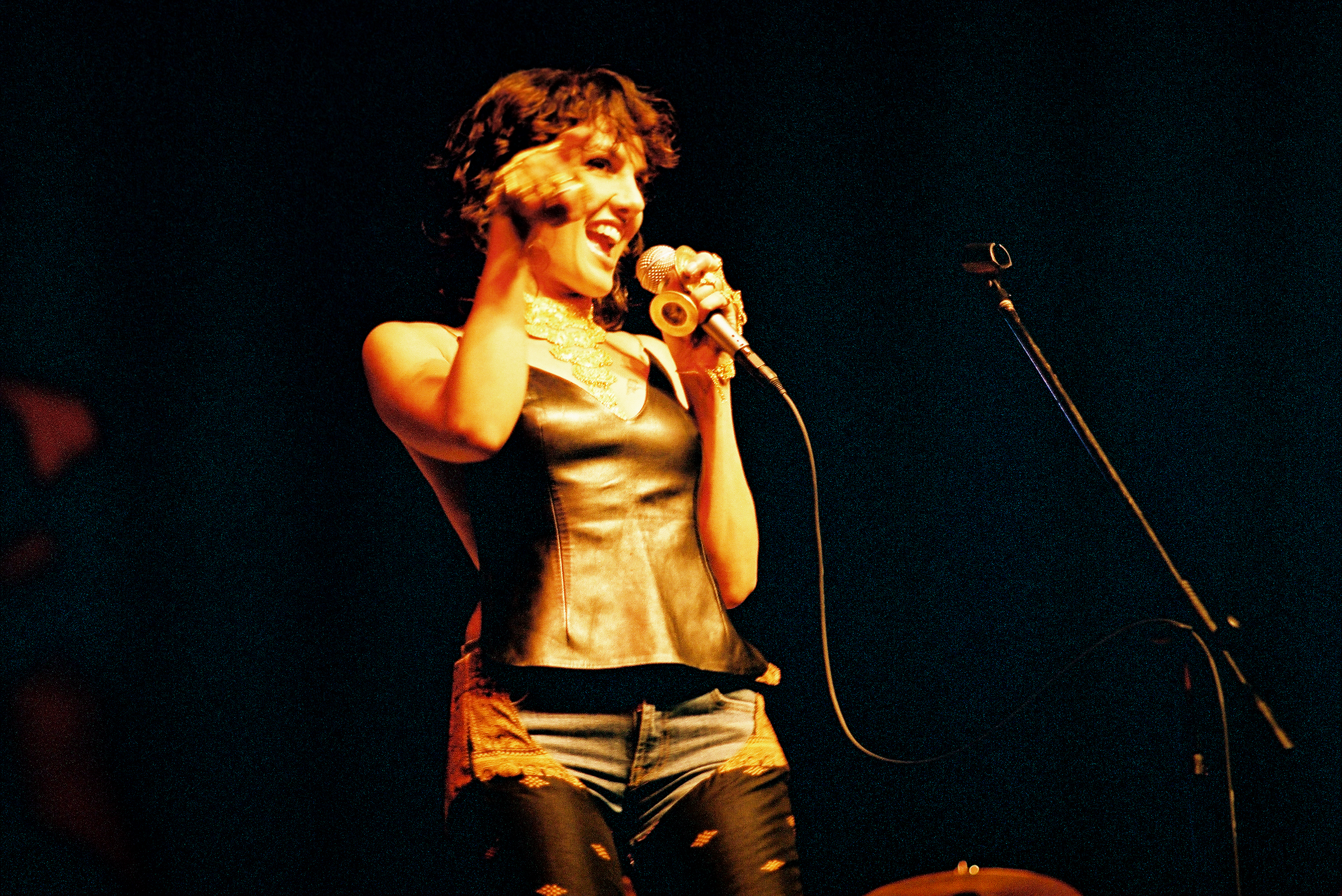

Background information
- Born: Dubai, United Arab Emirates
- Genres: pop; americana; folk; dance; world
- Occupations: singer, songwriter, filmmaker
- Instruments: vocals; guitar
- Children: Suhayl Kaylif

Layla Kaylif (Arabic: ليلى خليفة) is a British-Emirati singer-songwriter, film director, screenwriter and actress. She won the IWC Filmmaker Award at the 2015 Dubai International Film Festival for her original screenplay "The Letter Writer".

== Early life ==
Kaylif was born in Dubai, UAE to an English mother and an Emirati-Arab father. After studying at the American Academy of Dramatic Arts (AADA), she completed a degree in Arabic at the University of Oxford in the UK. After that, she spent three 3 years on her Ph.D, but did not complete it. During her studies, she researched the short stories of the Emirati writer Mohammad Al-Murr.

== Career ==
Kaylif began her musical career in 1999, while still a student when she was signed to Edel Records (United Kingdom), Avex Trax (South East Asia) and Jive (Benelux). She released her first album "Enough Rope", which featured the song "Shakespeare in Love", which she co-wrote with producer Greg Fitzgerald, who also co-wrote the title track for Kylie Minogue's "Fever" album. The song was inspired by the Oscar winning film "Shakespeare in Love". She was invited by Trudie Styler to perform alongside Sting and other music and film figures at the Shakespeare's Globe theatre.

"Shakespeare in Love" was named "Record of the Year" in Singapore. In 2008, she released her second album "Body of Lies".

In 2012, Layla translated and recorded an Arabic version of Leonard Cohen's "Hallelujah", receiving permission from Cohen’s publishers at the time, Sony Music Publishing, to release it.

In 2015, she won the IWC Filmmaker Award at the Dubai International Film Festival for her original screenplay "The Letter Writer", a romantic drama set in the 1960s. In 2018, she co-produced, directed and co-starred in "The Letter Writer", based on her original script. She also wrote and recorded a theme song for the film, "Let Me Count The Ways", an adaptation of Elizabeth Barrett Browning's Sonnet 43 "How Do I Love Thee" from her collection "Sonnets from the Portuguese".

"The Letter Writer" was part of the official selection for Best Foreign Feature Fiction at the Lebanese Independent Film Festival (LIFF) in 2019.

In 2020, her film was chosen as part of Film London’s Breakthrough Strand for emerging British filmmakers. In the same year, Layla returned to music, recording her critically acclaimed album "Lovers Don't Meet", produced by an American country music artist David Nail's sound engineer, Jason Hall in Nashville, United States. The album features a diverse line-up of musicians, including Reed Pittman, who produced Nail's EP "Bootheel 2020", and Matt "Ice" Iceman, who also collaborates with Nail.

She released her first single from the album, "As I Am", with influences from a poem by Nizar Qabbani followed by her second single, the album title track "Lovers Don’t Meet", inspired by Rumi. Walter Price writing for the Global Texan Chronicles in his review of the "As I Am" single called the album "awe inspiring", commenting that the single, "a subtle country-rock number", was "reminiscent of Linda Ronstadt, the Carpenters or perhaps Carole King". Mark Davies called the album "less a comeback, more of a glorious rebirth". David Nobakht wrote that it "enthralls in a manner akin to Joni Mitchell's timeless Blue LP".

In 2022, she became an ambassador for Defence for Children International (DCI) for Children Affected by Armed conflict and released her single "War on Children", which was also used to support DCI’s World Children's Day campaign.

In 2022, she began development on her second feature film, a modern day adaptation of William Shakespeare's "Antony and Cleopatra".

She alluded to her interest in the play, when she identified it as the inspiration of one her songs on the "Lovers Don’t Meet" album "Don’t You Know Me Yet", in an interview she gave to Americana music critic David Jarman, for Belles and Gals. In this article, she also mentions that she is a 'misfit', something she has spoken about before, and admits she has faced societal challenges in the past for being a singer because of her conservative Arab roots.

== Discography ==
=== Albums ===
- Enough Rope (1999)
- Body of Lies (2008)
- Lovers Don't Meet (2020)

=== Singles ===
- Shakespeare in Love (1999)
- Apricot Time (1999)
- Body of Lies (2008)
- Hallelujah (2012)
- As I Am (2020)
- Lovers Don't Meet (2020)
- War On Children (2022)

== Filmography ==
Year	Title	Role	Notes
2015	The Letter Writer	Director/Screenwriter/Actress	Won IWC Filmmaker Award
