= Petrofac =

British company

Petrofac Limited
- Type: Public limited company
- Traded as: LSE: PFC
- Industry: Engineering, Procurement & Construction, Oil & Gas
- Founded: 1981
- Headquarters: London, United Kingdom
- Key people: René Médori, Chairman; Tareq Kawash, Group Chief Executive; Afonso Reis e Sousa, Chief Financial Officer
- Products: Petrochemicals
- Revenue: ▼US$2,496 million (2023)
- Operating income: ▼US$(395) million (2023)
- Net income: ▼US$(523) million (2023)
- Number of employees: 7,950 (2023)
- Website: petrofac.com

Petrofac Limited is a British international energy services company that designs, builds, manages and maintains oil, gas, refining, petrochemicals and renewable energy infrastructure, and trains the people who support them. It operates in a range of markets from design to decommissioning. It is registered in Jersey (number 81792), with its main corporate office on Jermyn Street, London. It has 7,950 employees across more than 30 offices globally. It was for a time in the FTSE 100 Index. In October 2025 the Petrofac holding company filed for bankruptcy protection administration.

== History ==
The company was established as a producer of a modular plant in Tyler, Texas, United States in 1981. It was first listed on the London Stock Exchange in 2005. In 2010, it bought a 20 percent share in the Gateway storage scheme, an undersea cavern for gas storage. In November 2013, Petrofac and the Italian oil firm Bonatti partnered on a $650 million joint venture with Sonatrach to develop new separation and booster compression facilities, extending the life of the Alrar gas field in south-east Algeria. In November 2014, the company issued a profit warning, saying that profit for 2015 would fall by 25%, as slowing demand in China and abundant US output cut the oil price.

In January 2021, a former Global Head of Sales at Petrofac Ltd., which serves the British energy industry, pleaded guilty to charges related to bribery. The UK Serious Fraud Office confirmed that David Lufkin offered and paid around $30 million to win United Arab Emirates contracts worth $3.3 billion for Petrofac between 2012 and 2018. The guilty plea included 11 other charges of bribery, where Lufkin made corrupt offers to influence contract awards of more than $3.5 billion in Saudi Arabia, and over $730 million in Iraq. In October 2021 Petrofac was fined £77m for seven charges of failing to prevent bribery in the Middle East.

In April 2024, the company announced that, because of ongoing financing discussions, its financial results would be delayed to the end of May 2024, and in the meantime, its shares would be suspended. The results were announced on 31 May 2024, and trading in the shares resumed on 4 June 2024.

In May 2025, because of an ongoing restructuring, it again failed to file its financial results on time, and its shares were again suspended.

In October 2025, the company announced the termination of a contract with TenneT to build wind turbines off the Netherlands coast. Subsequently the Petrofac holding company, which apparently has debts approaching $4 billion, filed for administration, though this did not apply to its operating companies which continued operation.

In December 2025, it was announced that Petrofac had agreed to sell its UK-based Asset Solutions business to the US company, CB&I following Petrofac’s entry into administration earlier that year. The transaction, subject to creditor approval, would transfer the Asset Solutions division and its workforce to CB&I, where it is expected to operate as part of a new global business unit based in Aberdeen.
