= Kefah Mokbel =

British surgeon (born 1965)

Professor Kefah Mokbel FRCS
- Born: 1965 (age 60–61); Syria
- Education: Concord College
- Alma mater: University of London
- Occupation: Surgeon

Kefah Mokbel is a British surgeon who is the chair of breast cancer surgery and the multidisciplinary breast cancer program at the London Breast Institute of the Princess Grace Hospital part of HCA Healthcare, Professor (Honorary) of Breast Cancer Surgery at Brunel University London, an honorary consultant breast surgeon at St George's Hospital. Kefah Mokbel is the founder and current president of Breast Cancer Hope; a UK-based charity "dedicated to improving the quantity and quality of life in women diagnosed with breast cancer". He was appointed as a substantive consultant breast surgeon at St George's Hospital NHS trust in February 2001. He was named in Tatler magazine's Best Doctors Guide as one of the featured "Top Breast Surgeons" in 2006, 2007, 2013, and 2025 In November 2010 he was named in the Times magazine's list of Britain's Top Doctors.

== Personal details and education ==
Kefah Mokbel was born in 1965 in the currently occupied Golan Heights in Syria. He studied A levels in a boarding school (Concord College) in Shrewsbury. He graduated (MB, BS) from the University of London in 1990. He qualified as a Fellow of the Royal College of Surgeons (FRCS, England) in 1994. He was granted the Master of Surgery degree in 2000 by The Imperial College of Science, Technology and Medicine for his research in the field of molecular biology of breast cancer.

In 2002, Mokbel was appointed an Honorary Professor at The Brunel Institute of Cancer Genetics and Pharmacogenomics at Brunel University in recognition of his contribution to breast cancer research. In 2005, he was appointed as a Reader in Breast Surgery at St George's University of London in recognition of his outstanding research contribution in the field of breast cancer.

== Clinical interests ==
Mokbel's clinical interests in the field of breast surgery include the early detection of breast cancer, breast ductoscopy, minimally-invasive breast surgery, sentinel node biopsy, skin-sparing mastectomy, breast reconstruction, cosmetic breast surgery, prevention of breast cancer, genetic predisposition, integrative oncology and the management of benign conditions including breast cysts, mastalgia and fibroadenomas. Mokbel has extensive experience in the field of reconstructive and aesthetic breast surgery including augmentation mammoplasty (replacement of implants and correction of contracture), reduction mammoplasty and mastopexy.

== Research interests ==
Mokbel's main research interest lies in the field of molecular biology and the clinical management of breast cancer. He has published several papers in the field of aesthetic breast surgery including breast reconstruction following mastectomy and augmentation mammoplasty using implants and fat transfer. His research output includes over 400 published papers in medical literature. According to Google Scholar Kefah Mokbel has 400 publications which have been cited more than 11,000 times with a H-index of 61 and an i10-index of 219. Furthermore, his research linked the SET domain containing protein 2 (SETD2) gene to human breast cancer. He has also written 14 books in various disciplines including surgery, oncology, breast cancer, and postgraduate medical education. Mokbel is a member of the editorial board of several medical journals and a peer reviewer for medical journals including The Lancet.

In October 2017 Mokbel and his team reported through a metaanalysis that the use of hair dyes could be associated with a 20% increase in breast cancer risk.

In October 2018, Mokbel and his team reported that the use of testosterone gel for hyposexual desire might not increase breast cancer risk among women using it.

== Press and media coverage ==
Kefah Mokbel has been also featured in many publications and interviews regarding breast cancer and surgery in the national and international media including: The Times, The Daily Telegraph, The Guardian, New York Post, the BBC, ITV, NBC Washington, Hello Magazine, ABC News, MSN, Yahoo, The Daily Express, The Independent, The Medical Daily, The Evening Standard, Daily Mirror, Marie Claire and British Sky Broadcasting. He also writes medical articles for totalhealth and is one of totalhealth's specialist consultants. In 2013, Kefah Mokbel featured on BBC world news regarding the news that actress Angelina Jolie had preventative double mastectomy after finding that she is a BRCA1 gene carrier. He was depicted by Silas Carson in the BBC drama The C Word, about his real-life patient Lisa Lynch.
