= Bridges Fund Management =

British fund manager firm

- Industry: Financial industry
- Founded: 2002
- Founder: Michele Giddens, Philip Newborough and Sir Ronald Cohen
- Headquarters: London, W1; United Kingdom
- Website: bridgesventures.com

Bridges Fund Management Ltd. (or Bridges) (Previously Bridges Ventures) is a fund manager that specialises in sustainable and impact investing. It invests in business, properties and social sector organisations, with a focus on four impact themes: health and wellbeing, education and skills, sustainable living and under-served markets.

== History ==
Bridges was founded in 2002 by Michele Giddens, Philip Newborough and Sir Ronald Cohen.

Bridges was founded following the recommendations of the Social Investment Task Force, which was established by the UK government in 2000.

Bridges has an advisory arm, Bridges Impact+. It has a dual function: to maximise the social and environmental impact of Bridges’ own investments, and to work with external clients on projects that help to develop the sustainable and impact investing market as a whole.

Bridges Impact+ also runs an educational programme in partnership with the Wharton School of Business’s Social Impact Initiative called MBA Impact Investing Networking & Training (MIINT). The programme takes place annually and has historically included US graduate schools. Social enterprises represented by the winning team are ultimately awarded a seed investment.

Bridges won FT/IFC Sustainable Finance Award 2012 awarded by the Financial Times.
