= Ella Al-Shamahi =

British science communicator

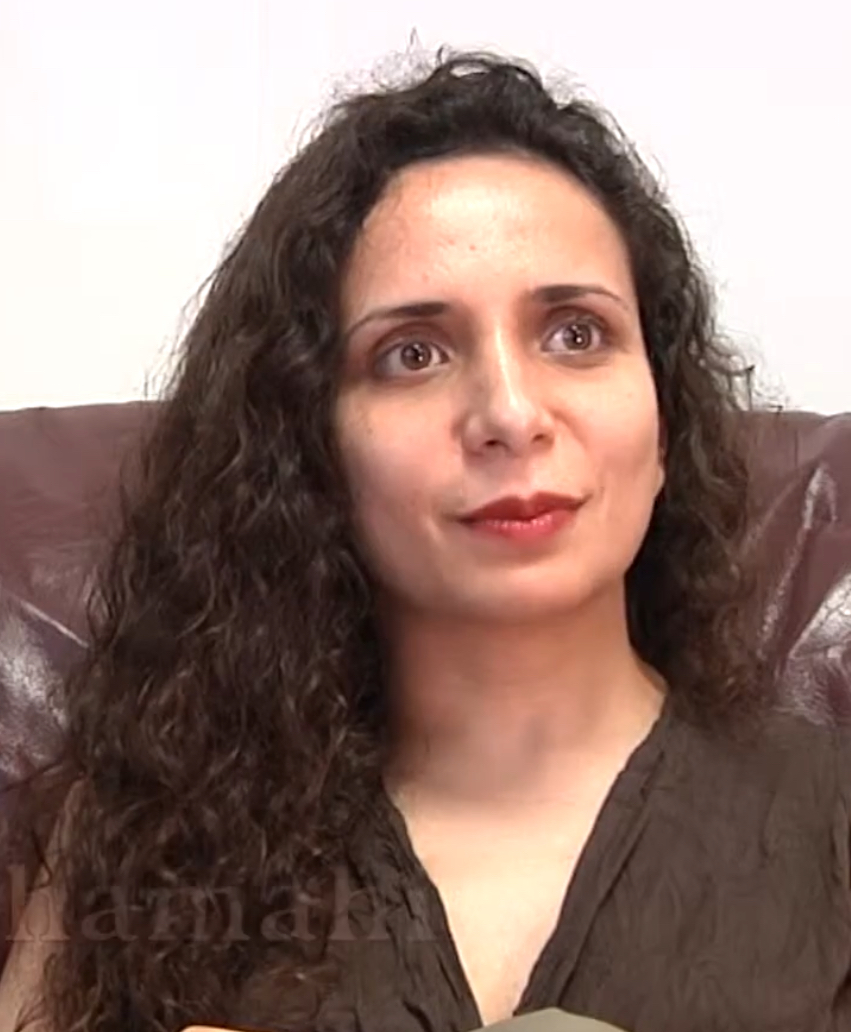
- Al-Shamahi in 2016
- Born: Aalaa Abdulla Al-Shamahi; 1983 (age 42–43); Birmingham, United Kingdom
- Education: University College London, PhD; Imperial College London. BSc, MSc
- Scientific career
- Fields: Paleoanthropology; Evolutionary Biology

Aalaa "Ella" Abdulla Al-Shamahi (Arabic: آلاء الشماحي; born 1983) is a British explorer, paleoanthropologist, evolutionary biologist, writer, comedian and presenter. She specialises in the study of Neanderthals. She is a trustee of the International Association for the Study of Arabia.

== Early life and career ==
Al-Shamahi was born and grew up in Birmingham. She is one of five siblings and has Yemeni and Syrian ancestry. Al-Shamahi graduated with a Bachelor of Science (BSc) in Evolutionary Biology from Imperial College London and a Master of Science (MSc) in Taxonomy and Biodiversity from Imperial College London in partnership with the Natural History Museum, London. She began a PhD in Evolutionary and Environmental Anthropology at University College London (UCL) in 2016 and remains a research student there.

In 2015 she was named a National Geographic Emerging Explorer. She is a Trustee of the International Association for the Study of Arabia, which promotes research relating to the cultural and natural heritage of the Arabian Peninsula.

== Expeditions ==
Al-Shamahi specialises in finding fossils in Palaeolithic caves in unstable and hostile territories, such as Syria, Iraq, Nagorno-Karabakh and Yemen. In her TED talk, Al-Shamahi describes her reconnaissance expedition to Socotra, a Yemeni island. The expedition was funded by the MBI Al Jaber Foundation as part of their ongoing support for the heritage of Yemen. She was prohibited from travelling to mainland Yemen, as it was a no-fly zone, but found that the island was relatively safe. However, she had to find a way to get to the island.

In early 2018 her team set off on a cement cargo ship through the Indian Ocean, where they were at risk of running into Somali pirates, and reached Socotra after three days. Besides Al-Shamahi, the team included Rhys Thwaites-Jones, Martin Edstrom, and Leon McCarron.

== TV programmes and media ==
=== Neanderthals - Meet Your Ancestors (2018) ===
In 2018 Al-Shamahi presented a BBC Two programme, Neanderthals - Meet Your Ancestors, investigating what the Neanderthal species of archaic humans looked like and how they lived in their Ice Age world. In particular, she takes a Neanderthal skull (named “Ned”) to a forensic expert who is able to reconstruct the face using clues from the bone structure, allowing us to admire the face of one of our ancient ancestors - one that hasn't been seen for more than 50,000 years. It turns out that they weren't knuckle-dragging ape-men at all. In fact, they were faster, smarter, better looking and much more like us than we ever thought. She worked with Andy Serkis on the programme.

=== Horizon - Body Clock (2019) ===
In 2019 Al-Shamahi presented an episode for Horizon called Body Clock: What Makes Us Tick?, in which a test subject was locked in an underground bunker for 10 days.

=== Jungle Mystery: Lost Kingdoms of the Amazon (2020) ===
In 2020 Al-Shamahi presented a Channel 4 documentary Jungle Mystery: Lost Kingdoms of the Amazon investigating various aspects of current and ancient indigenous communities and tribes in the Amazon. She reports on the discovery of one of the world’s largest collections of prehistoric rock art that has been discovered in the Amazonian rainforest. The site is in the Serranía de la Lindosa region in Colombia where other rock art has been found.

=== Waterhole (2020) ===
In 2020 Al-Shamahi and naturalist Chris Packham presented a BBC Two natural history documentary centred on a waterhole in the Mwiba Wildlife Reserve in northern Tanzania. The waterhole was specially created to allow close-up filming of the lives of some of Africa’s most iconic animals.

=== Tutankhamun: Secrets of the Tomb (2022), also listed as Tut's Toxic Tomb ===
In 2022 Al-Shamahi presented a Channel 4 documentary Tutankhamun: Secrets of the Tomb. The two-part series explores the curse of the Egyptian pharaoh's tomb, and whether there might be any scientific truth behind the legend.

=== What Killed the Whale? (2022) ===
In 2022 Al-Shamahi presented a Channel 4 investigative documentary, What Killed the Whale? Great numbers of whales are washed up and die on UK beaches every year. Al-Shamahi, along with the country’s leading frontline science organisations, investigated the causes of the crisis.

=== Human (2025) ===
In 2025, the BBC broadcast Human, a five-part science series presented by Al-Shamahi and shown on BBC2. The series covers the approximately 300,000 year history of Homo sapiens, focusing on the migration of humans into Asia, Europe, and North America. Related species, such as Neanderthals and Homo floresiensis (the so-called "Hobbits"), are also discussed.

The series was positively received by critics, with Dan Einav of the Financial Times noting the "genuinely awe-inspiring and unexpectedly moving moments" in his four star review. In an even more positive review, Jack Seale of The Guardian gave the series five stars and wrote that "it feels as if a presenting star is being born here".

The series aired in September and October 2025 on PBS in the US.

== TED ==
In 2019 Al-Shamahi gave a TED talk in which she described her expedition to the Yemeni island of Socotra. It is one of the most biodiverse places on earth, and she makes the case for scientists to explore the unstable regions that could be home to incredible discoveries.

== Comedy ==
Al-Shamahi is a stand-up comic and has performed several shows at the Edinburgh Fringe Festival.

Al-Shamahi says comedy is her coping strategy and a way to make the more esoteric parts of her work understandable to laypeople: "Some of the places I go are really dark, so it's a good way of dealing with this stuff."

== Books ==
Al-Shamahi's book, The Handshake: A Gripping History, was published in 2021. It presents an historical overview of the human handshake from its origins (at least seven million years ago) all the way to its sudden disappearance in March 2020 (due to the COVID-19 pandemic). One reviewer called the book “a fabulously sparky, wide-ranging and horizon-broadening little study, examining this most ancient of human gestures from a multitude of viewpoints”.

== Personal life ==
Al-Shamahi married at the age of 21 and lived in Surrey; her marriage, which was arranged by her imam, lasted five years.

=== Beliefs ===
As a child, Al-Shamahi was a devout Muslim who wore the hijab from the age of seven and began missionary work throughout Britain at the age of 13. Her biology studies at Imperial College London were undertaken with the eventual aim of disproving evolutionary theory, but she soon came to believe that the theory was correct and her later studies would further distance her from her faith. As of 2025, she was describing herself as a "non-practising Muslim".

She has said that she was a Muslim creationist missionary who went to university intending to disprove evolution. The gradual realisation she was wrong was devastating to her—it cost her her marriage, community, and entire social world. She said on RadioLab that "I was just so—so distraught. And the reason I was so distraught at this point was that I knew that meant I was gonna have to leave my world. [...] I literally just disappeared. And that's because I was a missionary and I knew the training. And the training is if somebody, you know, falls, you go collect them, basically."

Al-Shamahi characterises her political views as "wokey-progressive — definitely left-wing", but she has also called for the scientific field to be more accommodating of those who are right-wing or devoutly religious and for discussions to be more nuanced.
