= Ronald Mourad Cohen =

Egyptian-born British businessman and political figure

Sir Ronald Cohen
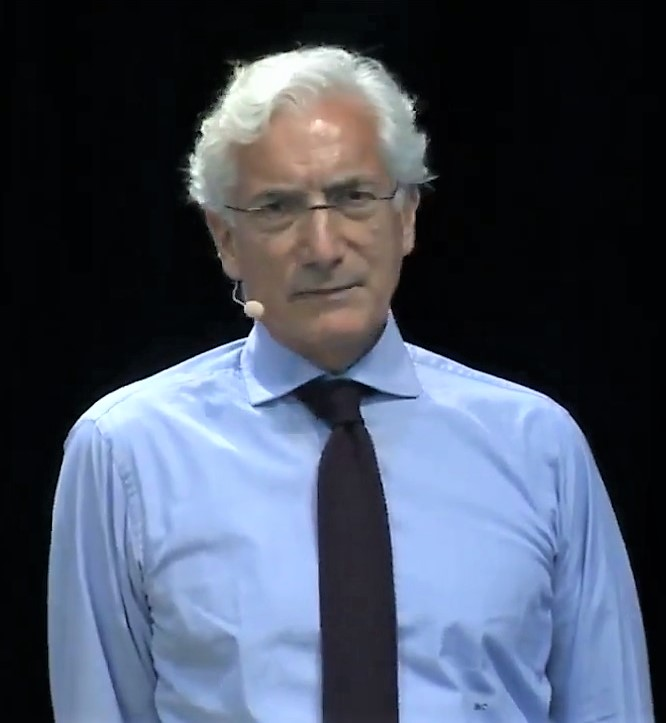
- Cohen in 2014
- Born: Ronald Mourad Cohen; 1 August 1945 (age 80); Egypt
- Education: Oxford University; Harvard Business School
- Occupation: Venture capitalist
- Title: Chairman, The Portland Trust and Bridges Ventures
- Spouse(s): Carol Belmont (divorced); Claire Enders (divorced); Sharon Harel
- Children: 2
- Relatives: Yossi Harel (father-in-law)

Sir Ronald Mourad Cohen (born 1 August 1945) is an Egyptian-born British businessman and political figure. He is the chairman of The Portland Trust and Bridges Ventures. He has been described as "the father of British venture capital" and "the father of social investment".

== Early life ==
Cohen was born in Egypt on 1 August 1945, to a Syrian-Jewish banker, Michael Mourad Cohen, and a British mother, Sonia Douek, also of Syrian-Jewish origin. In 1957, following the Suez Crisis, Cohen's family was forced to abandon all their assets and flee Egyptian president Nassar's persecution of Jews. The family (including younger brother Andre) moved to England. His father started his own import/export business, but having arrived with just £10, life was a struggle.

Though initially speaking only a few words of English, Cohen went to Orange Hill grammar school in North London, now part of Mill Hill County High School where despite describing it as "a school of very doubtful reputation" he excelled.

Cohen won a scholarship to Oxford University, where he became President of the Oxford Union, and earned a degree in Philosophy, Politics, and Economics at Exeter College. He subsequently attended Harvard Business School, where he was a member of the Harvard Business School Rugby Club.

== Career ==
After leaving Harvard Business School, Cohen worked as a management consultant for McKinsey & Company in the UK and Italy. In 1972, along with two former business school colleagues as partners, he founded Apax Partners, one of Britain's first venture capital firms. The company grew slowly at first, but expanded rapidly in the 1990s, becoming Britain's largest venture capital firm, and "one of three truly global venture capital firms". Apax provided startup capital for over 500 companies, and provided money for many others, including AOL, Virgin Radio, Waterstone's, and PPL Therapeutics, the company that cloned Dolly the sheep. In 1996 Cohen helped establish Easdaq, a technology focused stock exchange intended to be the European counterpart to the American NASDAQ. He is the recipient of a Jubilee Award for services to Israeli business, awarded by Benjamin Netanyahu and the BVCA's Lifetime Achievement Award. He is a member of the Harvard Board of Overseers and is also a fellow of Exeter College, Oxford.

In 2002, alongside Jon Moulton, he was the inaugural inductee into the Private Equity Hall of Fame, at the British Venture Capital Association and Real Deals' Private Equity Awards.

=== Social investment ===
In 2000, at the invitation of the Treasury he became Chairman of the Social Investment Task Force (SITF). The remit of the SITF was "to set out how entrepreneurial practices could be applied to obtain higher social and financial returns from social investment, to harness new talents and skills, to address economic regeneration and to unleash new sources of private and institutional investment". The SITF made several recommendations to Government, including that it: (1) introduce Community Investment Tax Relief (CITR); (2) match finance to help set up the first community development venture capital fund; (3) encourage banks to disclose more of their lending activities; (4) to support legislative and regulatory changes to provide greater latitude and encouragement for charitable trusts and foundations to invest in community development finance; and (5) to create the Community Development Finance Association (cdfa) to provide support for community development finance institutions (CDFIs).

In 2002, he co-founded and became chairman of Bridges Ventures, an innovative sustainable growth investor that delivers both financial returns and social and environmental benefits. Bridges Ventures has raised eight successful funds to date: Bridges Sustainable Growth Funds I, II and III, the Bridges Sustainable Property Fund, the CarePlaces Fund, Bridges Property Alternatives III, the Bridges Social Entrepreneurs Fund, and the Bridges Social Impact Bond Fund. The organisation currently has almost £600 million under management. The portfolio includes a number of businesses who invest in regeneration areas or have a sustainable business model. Bridges Ventures has had several successful exits to date, including The Gym Group, The Office, Simply Switch, HS Atec and Harlands of Hull.

In 2003, Cohen co-founded the Portland Trust with Sir Harry Solomon, co-founder and former chairman and CEO of Hillsdown Holdings. The aim of Portland Trust is to help develop the Palestinian private sector and relieve poverty through entrepreneurship in Israel. Portland Trust is involved in a number of important initiatives, including the development of financial and economic infrastructure, housing, trade, investment, and entrepreneurship. The Portland Trust has offices in London, Tel Aviv and Ramallah.

In 2005, Cohen chaired the Commission on Unclaimed Assets. which looked into how unclaimed funds from dormant bank accounts could be used to benefit the public. The final recommendation of the Commission was that a Social Investment Wholesale Bank be created to help finance charitable and voluntary projects by providing seed capital and loan guarantees.

In 2007 he co-founded and became a non-executive director of Social Finance UK, a London-based advisory organisation that has worked to create a social investment market in the UK. The organisation provides access to capital, designs social finance interventions and offers advice to investors and social sector entities interested in delivering significant social impact. It has developed the social impact bond which is a financial instrument that is an outcomes-based contract in which public sector commissioners commit to pay for significant improvement in social outcomes for a defined population. Social Finance set up a pilot social impact bond with the Ministry of Justice (MoJ) in September 2010 to reduce re-offending amongst male prisoners leaving HMP Peterborough who have served a sentence of less than 12 months. During the Peterborough Prison pilot, experienced social sector organisations, such as St. Giles Trust and the Ormiston Children and Families Trust, provided intensive support to 3,000 short-term prisoners over a six-year period, both inside prison and after release, to help them resettle into the community. In July 2017, the success of the Peterborough Social Impact Bond was announced. The results showed reoffending of short-sentenced offenders reduced by 9% overall compared to a national control group. This exceeded the target of 7.5% set by the Ministry of Justice. As a result, the 17 investors in the Peterborough Social Impact Bond receive a single payment representing their initial capital plus an amount that will represent a return of just over 3% per annum for the period of investment. Cohen is also a member of the board of directors for Social Finance UK's sister organisation in the United States, Social Finance US.

In 2010, Cohen chaired a review of the work of the SITF in 2010 and published a report titled Social Investment: Ten Years On which assess the changes that had happened over the last decade in the area of social investment. The report found that there are three specific initiatives that will help define the future of the social investment market in the UK: (1) establishing the infrastructure necessary to create a dynamic market in social investment through initiatives such as the Social Investment Bank; (2) creating new tools to deliver social change through financial instruments such as the social impact bond; (3) engaging the financial sector to invest in disadvantaged areas through the Community Reinvestment Act.

=== Big Society Capital ===
Since its official launch in July 2011, Sir Ronald Cohen has been the Chairman of Big Society Capital, Britain's first social investment bank. The role of the BSC is to help speed up the growth of the social investment market, so that socially orientated financial organisations will have greater access to affordable capital, using an estimated £400million in unclaimed assets left dormant in bank accounts for over 15 years and £200million from the UK's largest high street banks. Its first £1 million investment from dormant accounts has gone to the Private Equity Foundation, an organisation whose mission it is to support disadvantaged young people into employment, education or training.

=== Charity ===
In January 2005, Cohen was appointed a trustee of the British Museum. Cohen is a member of the executive committee of the International Institute of Strategic Studies.

=== Controversies ===
Cohen was chairman of Apax at the time of the Apax-owned British United Shoe Machinery pension collapse in 2000 which left 544 workers, many of them long service, without any pension. Collapse followed demerger from USM-Texon and asset transfer between the companies. Pension funds were transferred to the new BUSM scheme two weeks before receivership, and 4 days before a new revaluation was due. MPs Edward Garnier, Patricia Hewitt and Ashok Kumar all called for a proper enquiry, Garnier citing the "mysterious circumstances" under which the pensions "disappeared", whilst Hewitt said "it is clearly important that such serious allegations are properly investigated." No new investigation took place, leading Kumar to say "I think these people need flogging. I feel so angry on behalf of decent upright citizens robbed of their basic human rights. ... These are greedy, selfish capitalists who live on the backs of others."

In 2007, the GMB (trade union) blamed private equity firms for the collapse of 96 pension funds and linked Cohen with losses totalling £81m at Dexion, British United Shoe Machinery and USM Texon.

== Politics ==
In 1974 Cohen stood as the parliamentary candidate for the Liberal Party in Kensington North, and in 1979 he stood as its European candidate in London West.

In 1996 Cohen switched allegiance to the Labour Party, becoming a supporter of Tony Blair. In 2001, he was one of Labour's top 50 donors, giving £100,000 to its head office. In 2004, he was Labour's fourth largest financial supporter, after Lord Sainsbury, Sir Christopher Ondaatje and Lord Hamlyn.

In November 2011 he was financially linked with a new "non-political" movement in Israel, the sole goal of which is to change the country's electoral system.

== Personal ==
In 1972 Cohen married Carol Belmont; they divorced in 1975. In 1983 he married a second time, to Claire Enders; they divorced in 1986. Cohen married his third wife in 1987, Sharon Harel, daughter of Yossi Harel, the commander of the Holocaust survivors' ship Exodus; they have two children and live in London.

== Bibliography ==
- The Second Bounce of the Ball
  - Cohen, Ronald (November 2007). The Second Bounce of the Ball: Turning Risk into Opportunity. London: Weidefeld & Nicolson. ISBN 978-0-297-85148-6.
