= Maroc Soir Group =

Publishing company based in Casablanca, Morocco

Maroc Soir Group is a publishing company based in Casablanca, Morocco.

== Profile ==
The group is the oldest media company in Morocco. It was founded during the French protectorate-era as "Mas presse" by Pierre Mas and Yves Mas. Moulay Ahmed Alaoui was founder of the group. It edited the publication Le Petit Marocain which promoted the colonial policies of France in Morocco and defended its interests. It also supported the Vichy government and was reprimanded for that after 1945.

On 1 November 1971, during the Moroccanization, the company was expropriated and re-branded as Maroc Soir, editing Le Matin and Maroc Soir. In 2001, the group was acquired by Othman Benjelloun and sold again in March 2004 to its current Saudi owner, businessman Othman Al Omeir, a former editor-in-chief of Asharq Alawsat and current owner of Elaph. He acquired the group for $16 million.

== Newspapers ==
The Group owns the following papers:

- Assahra Al Maghribiya
- Le Matin
- Maroc Soir
- La Mañana – Weekly
- Defunct Morocco Times – in

== See also ==
- Ecomedias media group partly owned by the firm SNI editing Assabah and L'Économiste
