= Maroc Soir =

Maroc Soir may refer to the following newspaper companies:

- Maroc Soir Group, a Moroccan newspaper publishing company.
- Maroc Soir (newspaper), a Moroccan newspaper owned by Maroc Soir Group.
