= Karim Bouzida =

Moroccan PR agent

Director of Media Relations at the Court of Mohammed VI
- Incumbent
- Assumed office December 2014
- Preceded by: Chakib Laarousi

Personal details
- Born: 1972 (age 52–53); Casablanca, Morocco
- Occupation: Public Relations; Chargé de Mission at the Moroccan royal court Director-general of Mena Media Consulting

Karim Bouzida (Arabic: كريم بوزيدة; born 1972 in Casablanca) is a Moroccan PR agent. He is the communication strategy Chargé de mission at the royal court of Mohammed VI, reportedly in charge of promoting the image of the monarch. He is also the director-general of Mena Media Consulting, a PR and communications strategy agency owned by the monarch's friend and influential advisor Fouad Ali El Himma.

In 1997, Bouzida worked in "Top Publicité" a marketing agency who collaborated with the CNSS, the Moroccan national social security company.

In 2002 and 2003 he was cited as the deputy-director of Klem Euro RSGG, a marketing and communication agency that won a tender from the Moroccan Ministry of the Interior to promote participation in the parliamentary and communal elections. He did the same thing in 2007 before being engaged by El Himma to manage Mena Media Consulting, which conducted many PR activities such as: promoting the image of Authenticity and Modernity Party, social media surveillance for the Moroccan Ministry of the Interior and promoting the image of the ONEE, the Moroccan national office for the distribution of electricity.

In December 2014, Bouzida was officially appointed as the Director of Media Relations at the court of Mohammed VI. He replaced Chakib Laaroussi who was sacked after Mohammed VI cancelled an official visit to China which was planned for 27 November 2014.

== See also ==
- Maroc Soir Group, media company editing Le Matin, the daily that promotes the image of the king in Morocco.
- Maghreb Arabe Presse, press agency that specialises in covering the activities of the king.
- Abdellatif Mennouni, spokesperson of the royal court
