= Mena Media Consulting =

Moroccan public relations firm

- Type: Société anonyme
- Industry: Public Relations; Marketing
- Founded: 2004
- Founder: Othman Al Omeir; Fouad Ali El Himma
- Defunct: 2018
- Headquarters: Rabat, Morocco
- Area served: Morocco
- Key people: Fouad Ali El Himma; Karim Bouzida
- Owner: Fouad Ali El Himma

Mena Media Consulting or simply Mena Media was a Moroccan public relations firm owned by King of Morocco Mohammed VI's friend and influential advisor Fouad Ali El Himma. It was dissolved in 2018.

The company was founded by Saudi businessman Othman Al Omeir in late 2004. It was later cited as belonging to El Himma. Between 2008 and 2016, Othman El Ferdaous worked in the company as "director in charge of mission".

According to local activists, Mena Media consulting was involved in Moroccan social media surveillance, and went from "the simple aggregation of public information" to "listing and profiling of activists writing on blogs and social media platforms".

== Work ==
- It held contracts with the Moroccan ministry of the Interior for the surveillance of social media platforms.
- It held contracts with the ONEE (Moroccan national office for electricity) for the promotion of its image.

== See also ==
- Maroc Soir Group, media company editing Le Matin, the daily that promotes the image of the king in Morocco.
