= Al-Sulaim =

Dynasty on the throne of Unaizah in Saudi Arabia since 1817

Al-Sulaim Family آل سليم
- Parent house: Al-Sulaim
- Country: Unaizah
- Founded: 1817
- Founder: Yahia bin Sulaiman Al-Sulaim
- Current head: Abdullraman Al Sulaim
- Titles: Emir of Unaizah
- Estate: Unaizah

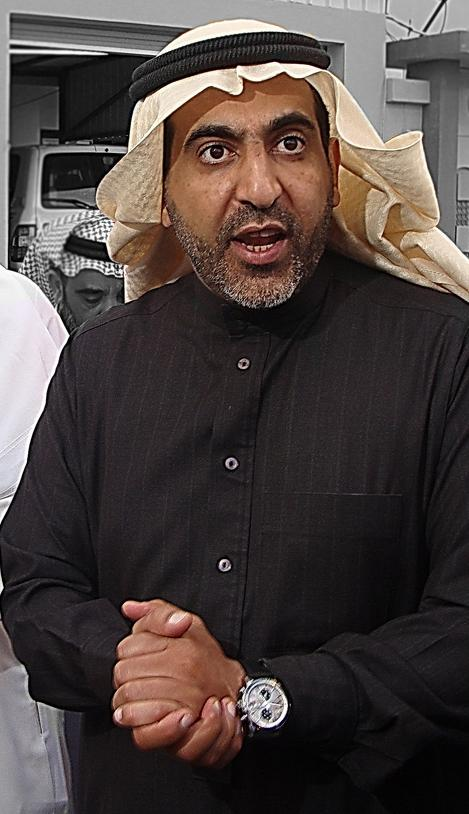
Unaizah Governor Musaad Al-Sulaim from (2007–2011).

The Royal Family of Al-Sulaim is the dynasty that has sat on the throne of Unaizah in Saudi Arabia since 1817. They became the rulers after prince Yahia bin Sulaiman Al Zamil Al-Sulaim (1817–1836) killed the governor appointed by the Ottomans. Prince Yahia continued to govern the state until he was killed in the battle of Bag’a with bin Al Rashid of Ha'il.

Prince Zamil al-Sulaim (1864–1887) One of the most prominent leaders of his time, and revered for his impressive and fearless warfare skills, was known among the Bedouin tribes as Alexander of the desert. It is in his time the great Charles Montagu Doughty visited Unaizah and wrote about the city in his book Travels in Arabia Deserta (1888).

The prince and also the "rightful Heir" to Unaizah throne Abdulaziz Abdullah al-Sulaim (1901–1914) became famous when he re-captured the Unizah after it was lost in the aftermath of the al-Mulaida war between bin Rashid and the people of Qasim. His most important achievement was signing a treaty with king Abdulaziz that gave Al-Sulaim total sovereignty over the city of Unaizah.

== See also ==
- Alyahya
