= Unaizah =

Unaizah محافظة عنيزة
- Governorate
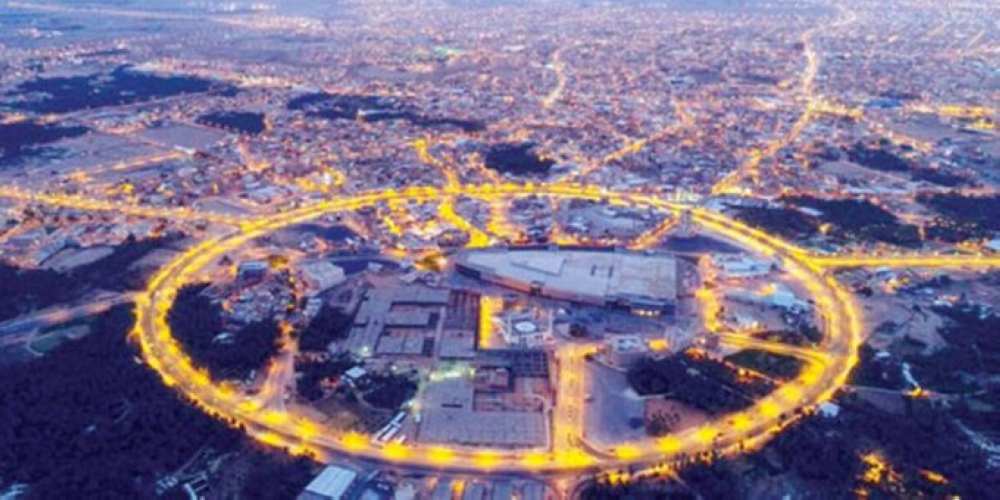
- The internal ring road around Unaizah Mall

- Location within Saudi Arabia
- Coordinates: 26°5′26″N 43°59′15″E
- Country: Saudi Arabia
- Province: Al Qassim Province

Population (2022)
  - Total: 184,600
- Time zone: UTC+03:00 (SAST)
- Postal Code: 51911
- Area code: +966-16
- Website: um.gov.sa

Unaizah (Arabic: عنيزة ʿUnaizah) or officially The Governorate of Unaizah (also spelled Onaizah, Onizah, or Unayzah; Arabic: محافظة عنيزة Muḥāfiẓat ʿUnaizah) is a Saudi Arabian city in the Al Qassim Province. It lies south of the province capital Buraydah and north of Riyadh, the capital of the Kingdom of Saudi Arabia. It is the second largest city in Al-Qassim Province with a population of 184,600 (2022 census).

Historically, Unaizah was an important stopping point for Muslim pilgrims coming from Mesopotamia (now Iraq) and Persia (now Iran) on their way to Makkah. Many historians believe that Unaizah was inhabited hundreds of years before the spread of Islam, citing its reference in numerous poems from some of the most important poets of pre-Islamic Arabia such as Imru' al-Qais.

== Geography ==
Unaizah is in the south of Al-Qassim Province and at the heart of the historical region of Najd. It is located roughly 27 kilometres (17 miles) from Buraydah (the capital of the province) and 315 kilometers (196 miles) north of the Saudi capital, Riyadh. Unaizah lies in the northern-central region of the Najd and to the south of the Wadi al-Rummah (Rumma Valley), which is the longest valley on the Arabian Peninsula. It is surrounded by sand dunes to its north and west, which are known locally as the Al-Ghamis Sands. The Al-Ghadha Woods are located to the north of the city. Next to Unaizah is the Al-Aushaziyah salt lake, which is the largest salt lake in the Arabian Peninsula.

=== Climate ===
Unaizah has a hot desert climate (Köppen Climate Classification BWh), with long, extremely hot summers and short, very mild winters. The maximum temperature in August is 43.6 °C (110.5 °F). The city experiences very little precipitation, especially in summer, but receives a fair amount of rain in March. The city is also known for its frequent dust storms.

== Agriculture ==
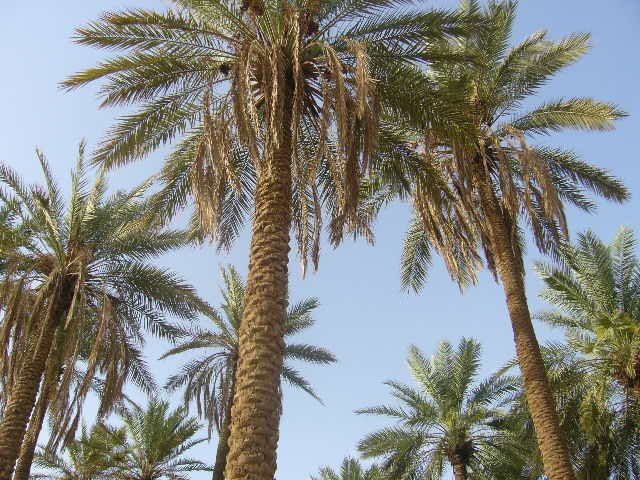
Palm trees in Unaizah

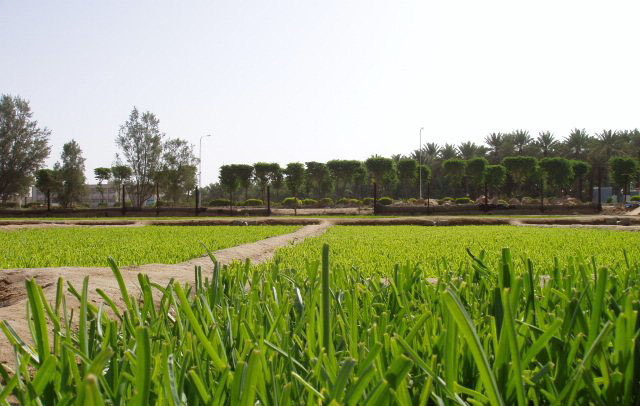
Leeks (kurrat) farm in Unaizah

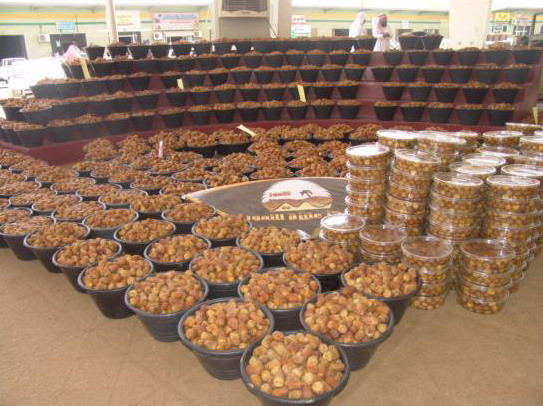
A section in Unaizah International Dates Festival 08

Unaizah is an agricultural area and produces wheat and barley of various strains. The region also grows grapes, grapefruits, lemons, leeks, mandarins, oranges, pomegranates and dates.

Leeks (kurrat) are a very important part of the local culture of Unaizah. They are popular among the locals and comprise a significant portion of the local agricultural industry.

An annual Date Season Festival has been held in September since the early 2000s, giving Unaizah the distinction of hosting the second largest date festival in the Persian Gulf and the Middle East. The festival rivals the date festival of neighboring Buraydah's, which is sometimes known as "Buraydah, the City of Dates".

Unaizah's 2008 (4th) annual Date Festival was known as the "Unaizah International Date Festival", though the city's title "Unaizah, the Kingdom of Dates" was retained as a motto. Many people from different places of the Middle East come to see this festival and buy dates because they know there is a good quality of dates.

== Government ==
Unaizah Municipality logo

The Unaizah Municipality (Arabic: بلدية عنيزة or baladiyah Arabic: البلدية ) was founded in 1381 AH (1961/1962 CE) in Unaizah. It carries out the civic administration for the Metropolitan area of Unaizah. The municipality was established for the purpose of maintaining villages, regulating construction projects and systematizing public health, safety measures and the construction of the infrastructure of the city such as roads, the stormwater drainage network and street lighting. The Unaizah Municipality has 3 main agencies:

- Services Agency : Responsible of maintenance and operation of facilities in the city.
- Project Management Agency: Responsible of managing and regulating the construction projects in the city.
- Urbanization and Planning Agency: Responsible of urban planning and administrating lands and properties in the city.

The municipality has had 16 mayors since it was founded.

Unaizah Municipality Mayors
n	Mayor	From	To
1	Abdullah bin Saleh Al Muhaimid	1381 AH	1388 AH
2	Ibrahim bin Abdulaziz Al-Bassam	1388 AH	1389 AH
3	Abdul Aziz bin Abdul Rahman Al-Dahman	1389 AH	1390 AH
4	Abdullah bin Muhammad Al-Humaidi	1390 AH	1396 AH
5	Abdullah bin Abdul Rahman Al-Jamaan	1396 AH	1396 AH
6	Abdullah bin Saleh Al-Hammad	1396 AH	1403 AH
7	Abdullah bin Abdulaziz Al-Bassam	1396 AH	1409 AH
8	Saleh bin Abdullah Al-Naeem	1409 AH	1413 AH
9	Saleh bin Abdullah Al-Nadawi	1413 AH	1413 AH
10	Fahd bin Muhammad Al-Jubeir	1413 AH	1420 AH
11	Abdullah bin Suleiman Al-Attiyah	1420 AH	1421 AH
12	Eng. Ahmed bin Abdullah Al-Mazrou’	1421 AH	1426 AH
13	Eng. Ibrahim bin Muhammad Al-Khalil	1426 AH	1432 AH
14	Eng. Abdul Aziz bin Abdullah Al-Bassam	1432 AH	1440 AH
15	Eng. Khalaf Hamdan Al-Otaibi	1440 AH	1442 AH
16	Eng. Faris bin Muhammad Al-Qahtani	1442 AH (2020/2021 CE)	Incumbent

there is 18 villages and offices within the range of Unaizah Municipality.

Alhufayrah	Albuaiten	Al'awniyyah	Wadi Aljanah
Alrawghani	Alwahlan	Wadi Abu Ali	Aldal'ah
Manzelt Abu Ali	Aladaen	Alfardah	alanbaryah
alrafiah	Alghabshyah	alaushazia	Almubarkiya
Albarbk	Alnaam		

== Education ==
Unaizah is home to some pioneers in education; the first Saudi person from Al-Qassim Province to earn a PhD. degree was from Unaizah, and his name was Abdulaziz Al-Khowaiter. The first Saudi female from Al Qassim Province to earn a PhD degree was also raised in this city. Her name was Ebtisam Al Bassam.

One of the first cities to embrace female education in Al-Qassim Province and Najd was Unaizah. It faced resistance from neighboring provinces and brought Unaizah at the forefront of a national debate. After lengthy negotiations, the capital city of Qassim, Buraidah a sister city of Unaizah, officially recognized the right of an education for females, partly due to King Abdulaziz's interference in settling the dispute.

Today, there are many public schools in Unaizah for all three educational levels (primary, intermediate, and secondary). There are also two private schools and one private international school. There is also a boys' technological secondary school in the city and a technological college, as well as a girls' educational college. Qassim University is located approximately 30 kilometers north of the city, and enrolls both males and females.

== Western travelers ==
The people of Unaizah are well known for their hospitality and acceptance for people from other races and religions. The famous Charles Montagu Doughty lived in the city during his odyssey and wrote highly about the city.

Amin al-Rihani (the famous Franco-Lebanese scholar and traveler) spoke highly of the city's architecture and works of art in his book "Kings of Arabia" likening it to Paris thereby coining the nickname "Paris of Najd" for the city.

== Tourism ==
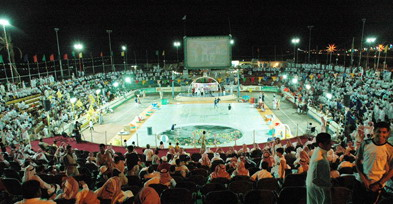
The Roman Amphitheatre during the 2005 Unaizah Festival

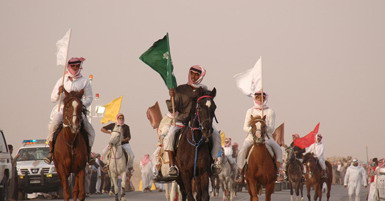
The Al Ghadha Desert Festival

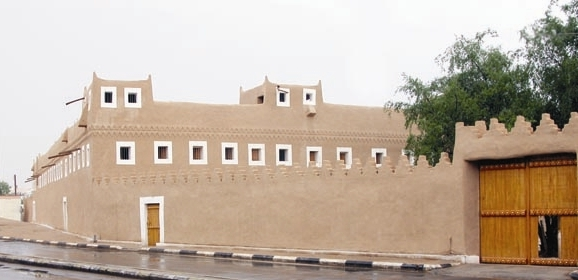
Built in 1955, Al Bassam Mansion is one of the main tourist attractions in Unaizah

There are twelve tourist festivals and activities recognized by the Saudi Commission for Tourism & Antiquities, and a calendar has been made for these events.

Unaizah, has renewed its status as a trailblazer of Tourism in the Qassim Province

— Prince Faisal bin Bandar Al Saud (the Governor of Al-Qassim and Chairman of the province's Tourism Council)

The tourist attractions in Unaizah range from festivals to private meetings in family ranches. Some of the most notable venues in which festivals are held are the following:

- Almusawkaf
- Onaizah Mall
- Othaim Mall
- Al-Ghada Park
- Al Bassam Mansion, a traditional house and a private museum
- Al Hajeb Parks
- Al Hamdan House, a traditional house and a private museum
- Asia Resort and Park
- Dream Land, the largest theme park in Al Qassim Province and reportedly the Central Region
- Judaida Local Market
- King Fahd Cultural Center
- The Roman amphitheater
- Salih Bin Salih Cultural Center
- The Unaizah House for Traditional Legacy
- Caravanserai Museum, a little museum of antiques, family memories, traditional things, and historical stories

There are five hotels in Unaizah, two of which are currently under construction, in addition to the rental apartments and suites distributed all around the city:

- Al Fahd Crown (under construction)
- Golden Tulip (under construction)
- Radisson Blu Hotel (under construction)
- Onaizah Hotel
- Boudl

Although Unaizah is thought to be relatively more accepting of visitors than its neighbors, its tourism industry faces criticism for a number of reasons. One such criticism is its disregard for infrastructure maintenance.

== Culture ==
=== Religion ===
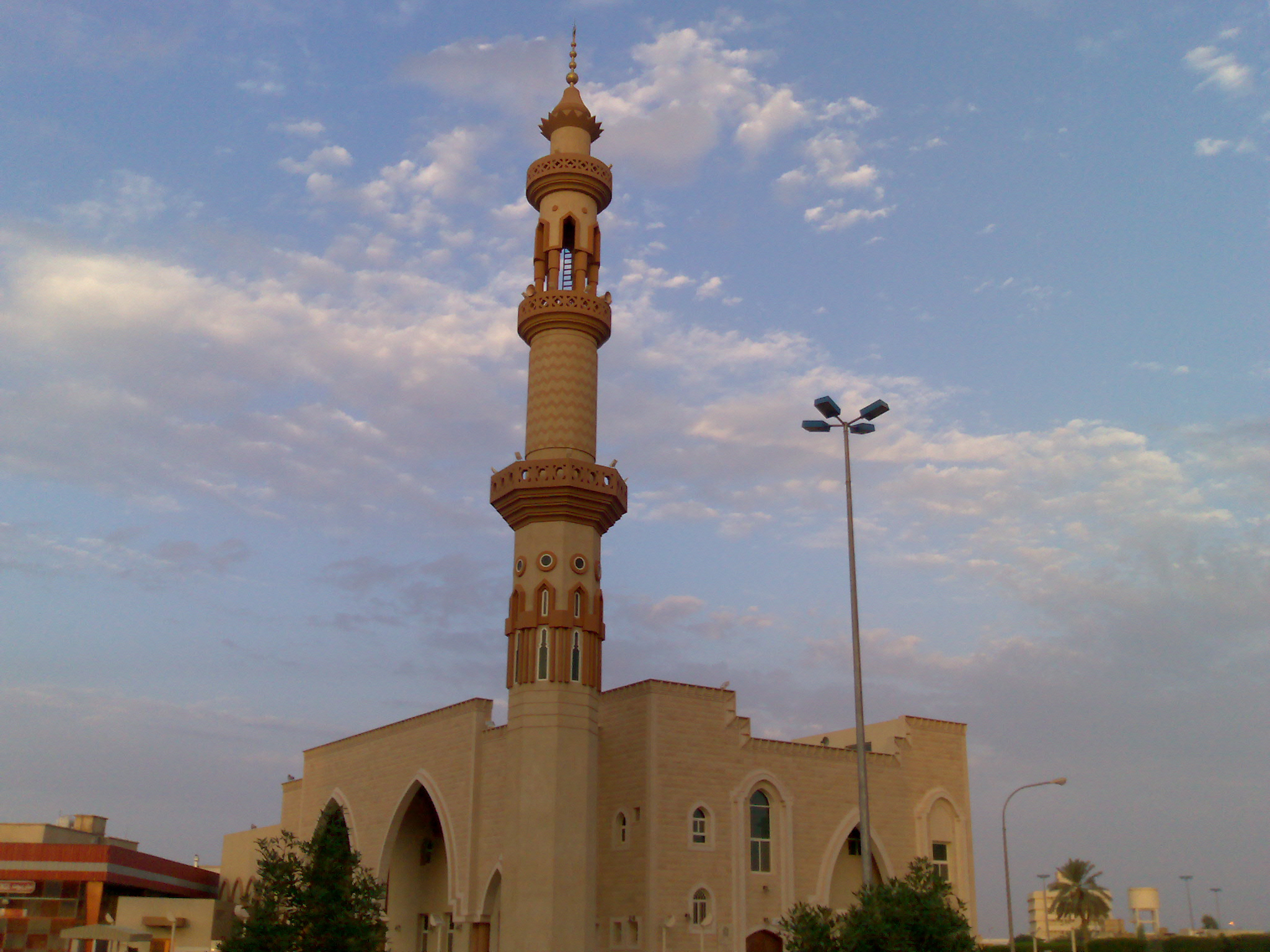
Al Gadhi Mosque

All of the Saudi citizens of Unaizah are Sunni Muslim with a small minority of Dharmic religions, (mostly Hinduism) brought and practiced in the city by Asian workers (mainly Indians). As with the rest of Saudi Arabian cities, non-Islamic worship houses are not allowed. The majority of the city's inhabitants are socially conservative. One of Saudi Arabia's leading religious clerics Muhammad ibn al Uthaymeen was a student of the Sheikh Abd ar-Rahman ibn Nasir as-Sa'di, an Unaizah native. Muhammad ibn al Uthaymeen was born and raised in Unaizah. He lived in Unaizah where many mosques have been built and named after him.

=== Cuisine ===
The Qassimi cuisine in general, and the cuisine of Unaizah is famous for its delicious food, and for its tasty traditional meals such as Jereesh, Margoug, Gersan, and Metazeez.

As for sweets, along with other Qassimi sweets, the Qassimi Kleeja is a well-known sweet in Saudi Arabia and in Eastern Arabia.

Like other Saudi cities, the Najdi Kabsa is the most traditional lunch. The Yemeni Mandi is also popular as a lunch meal.

=== Sports ===
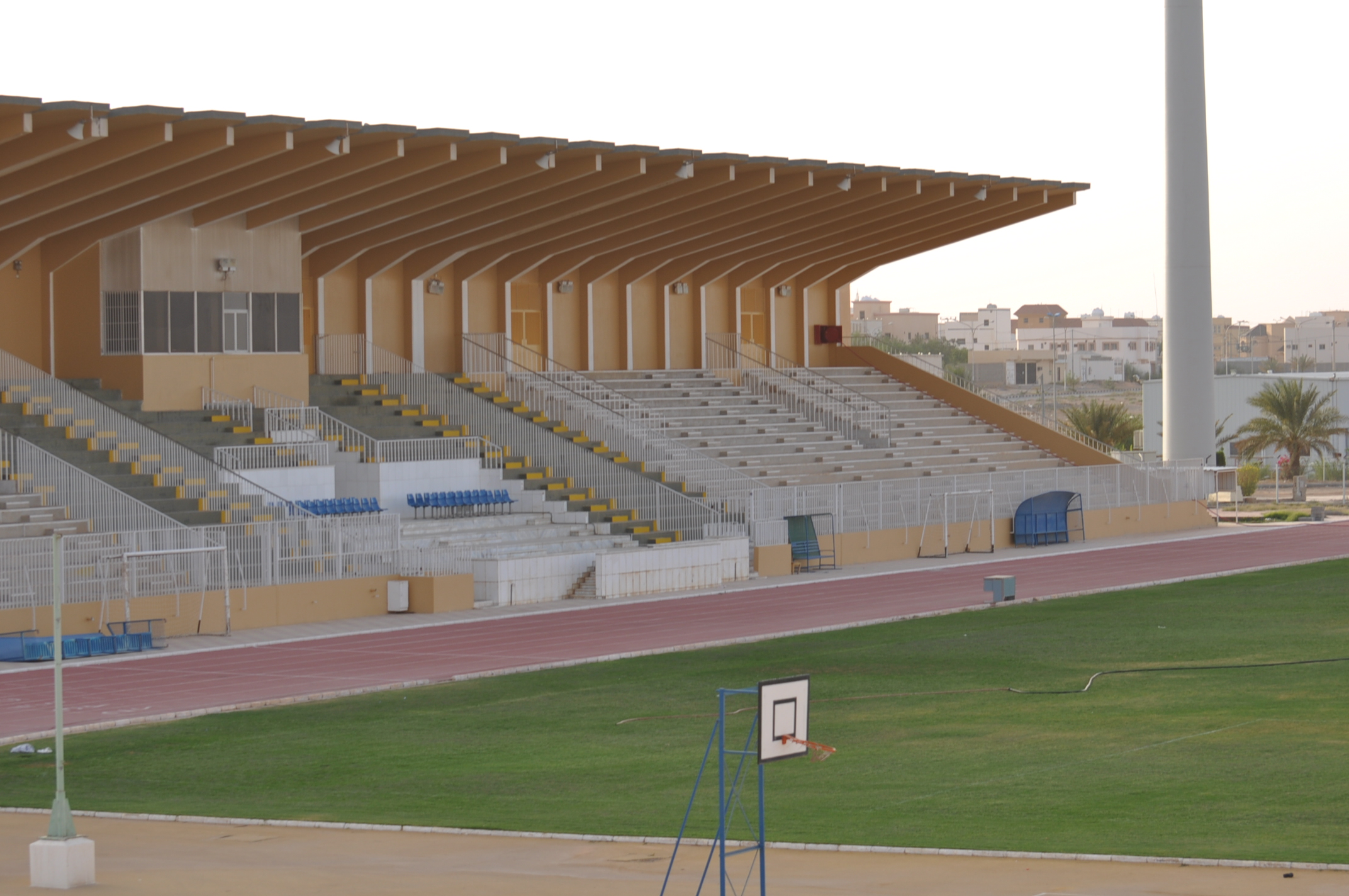
Department of Education Stadium

Unaizah is very active in terms of sports. Football is the most popular sport all over Saudi Arabia, and it is very popular in Unaizah, it is played in school's P.E. (i.e. Physical Education) lessons, and it is common to see a group of kids playing it in the streets.

There are two local clubs in Unaizah, the Saudi Al Najmah club, and the Al Arabi club.

=== Population ===
The city has experienced very high rates of population growth. Unaizah officially counted population in the city limits in 2010 was 163,729.

=== Media ===
Unaizah is served by six major Arabic-language newspapers, Al Jazirah, Al Riyadh, Okaz, Al Watan, Al Hayat, Al Yaum. Unaizah has one local magazine, that issues every four months, it is called Paris Najd, named after the widest spread nickname of Unaizah. In addition to many other national and international magazines distributed everywhere in the city's markets.

Television stations serving the city area include Saudi TV1, Saudi TV2, Saudi TV Sports, Al Ekhbariyah, ART channels network and hundreds of cable, satellite and other specialty television providers.

== Ruling dynasty ==
Historical records document 34 emirs who governed Unaizah over a period of 327 years, drawn from several tribal families across successive political eras. Before the establishment of the first Saudi state, the city was governed by representatives of Al Fudhl, Al Jannah of Bani Khaled, Al Mushaaib, and Al Shaaib, among others. During the first Saudi state, governance passed through several appointed emirs directly connected to Diriyah. Following the fall of Diriyah in 1233 AH, a period of instability saw representatives of Al Jumai and other families govern in quick succession. During the second Saudi state, a succession of emirs from various families governed the city, including Al Harbi,Al Thukair, Al Qadhi, Al Suhayimi, and Al-Sulaim. During the period of Al-Rashid rule over Najd, Unaizah was governed by the Alyahya from 1308 to 1322 AH. Following the unification of the Kingdom, members of the Al-Sulaim family have served as governors of Unaizah under the Saudi state.

== Notable people ==
- Musa'ad al-Senany, Saudi Minister of Labor and Social Affairs
- Ibrahim Alsulaiman Alakeel, Chief of Prince Faisal’s court(Viceroy of Hejaz), and later Ambassador of Saudi Arabia to Egypt and the Kingdom of Libya (1954-1961)
- Lubna Olayan, prominent businesswoman
- Ibrahim bin Abdullah Al Suwaiyel, former Saudi Ambassador to the United States
- Heythem Abdullah ALZamel, one of the First Saudi Trauma/Acute Care Surgeons; educated and trained in the United States
- Ibrahim Al-Juffali, prominent Saudi businessman and industrialist
- Abdullah al-Senany, poet, educator, and calligrapher
- Azzam al-Kadi, laparoscopic and trauma surgeon, public figure, and assistant professor at Al Qassim University
- Mohammad al-Yahya, first Saudi Arabian CEO at the bank of HSBC
- Mohammad al-Sebayel, the first Arab surgeon to perform a human liver transplant
- Abdulaziz al-Hazzaa, comedian notable for his different voice levels
- Khalid Al-Mansour, Saudi retired footballer
- Abdullah al-Nuaim, Riyadh region mayor, vice president of King Saud University, founder and President of the Board of Trustees, King Fahad National Library
- Abdulaziz al-Nuaim, member of the Saudi Shura Council
- Abdullah bin Sulaiman al-Hamdan, Prime Minister, Minister of Finance, adviser to King Abdulaziz
- Abdul Aziz Bin Abdullah Al Zamil, industrial engineer and politician, Minister of Industry and Electricity
- Yousef Al-Othaimeen, Minister of Social Affairs
- Abdulmohsen Al-Bassam, retired officer in the Royal Saudi Air Force and a former astronaut. He was the back-up payload specialist for Sultan bin Salman bin Abdulaziz Al Saud on STS-51-G
- Muhammad Al Zughaiby, Minister of Transportation
- Nassir Al-Salloum, Minister of Transportation
- Dawood Alsulaim, pilot, major general, and former Saudi Military Attaché to the United Kingdom
- Saleh Al Abbad, former chief of the Saudi Royal Court
- Saad Al-Sowayan, anthropologist and writer
- Sulaiman S. Olayan, one of Saudi Arabia's leading businessmen
- Sulaiman Al Sulaim, former Minister of Commerce and Finance and Chairman of Saudi American Bank
- Yusef Al-Bassam, President of the Saudi Development Fund
- Ahmad Al Dubayan, director of the Islamic Cultural Centre in London
- Abdul-Rahman ibn Nasir al-Sa'di, a Sunni Muslim scholar and former imam of the city's Jami' mosque
- Muhammad ibn Uthaymeen, a Sunni Muslim scholar and former imam of the city's Jami' mosque

== In the news ==
Unaizah is well known for its hospitality, hence, there are a variety of tourism Festivals in the year. These include dates, and healthy crops festivals. There is also a bi-annual cultural festival which is a trademark for this city. It was the only city of the Najd region to invite a Saudi Shiite cleric to speak in a public event, in a grass-roots effort to promote a united national identity. This drew criticism from conservatives in neighboring cities.

== Gallery ==
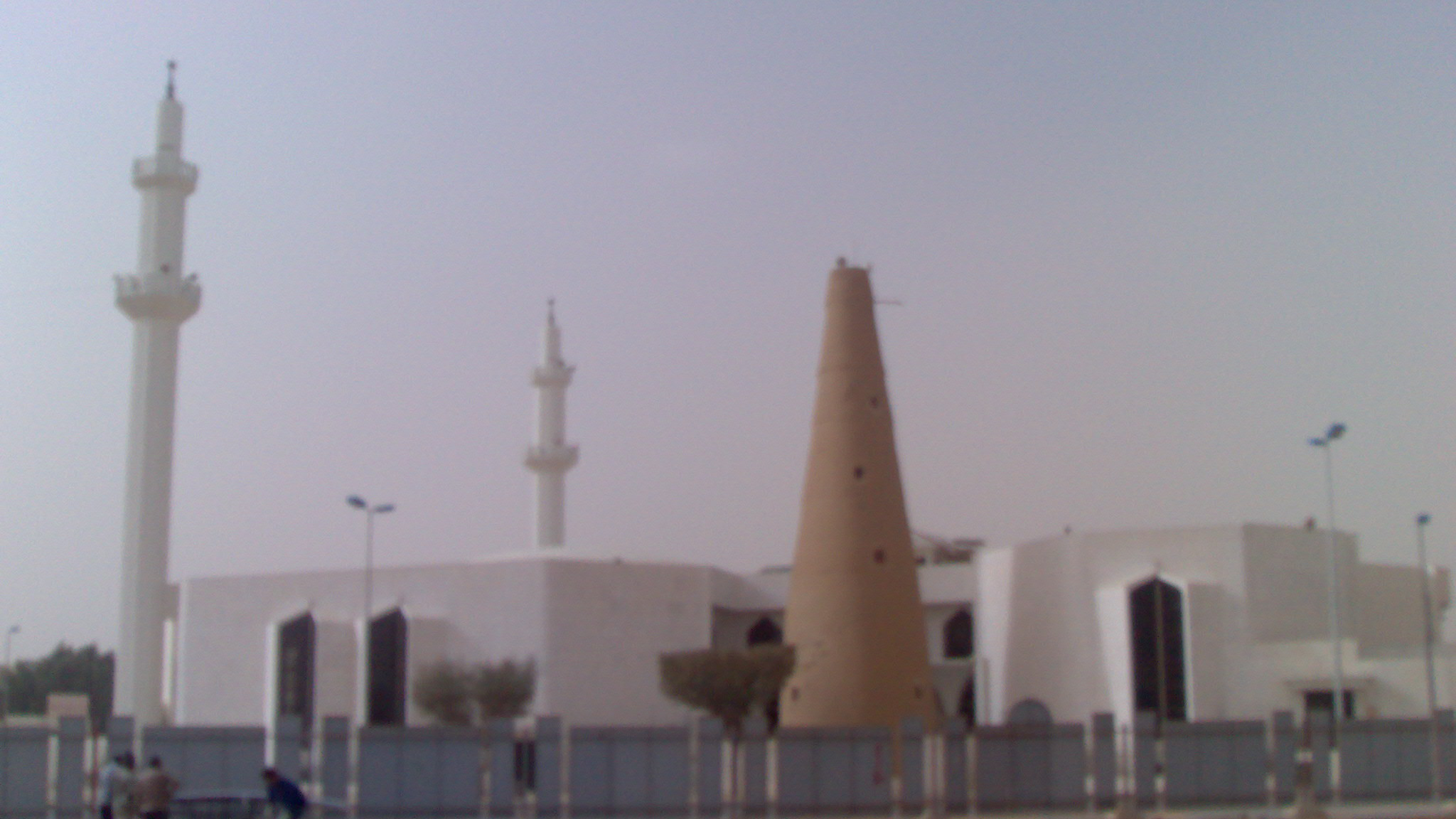
Bin Uthaimeen Mosque

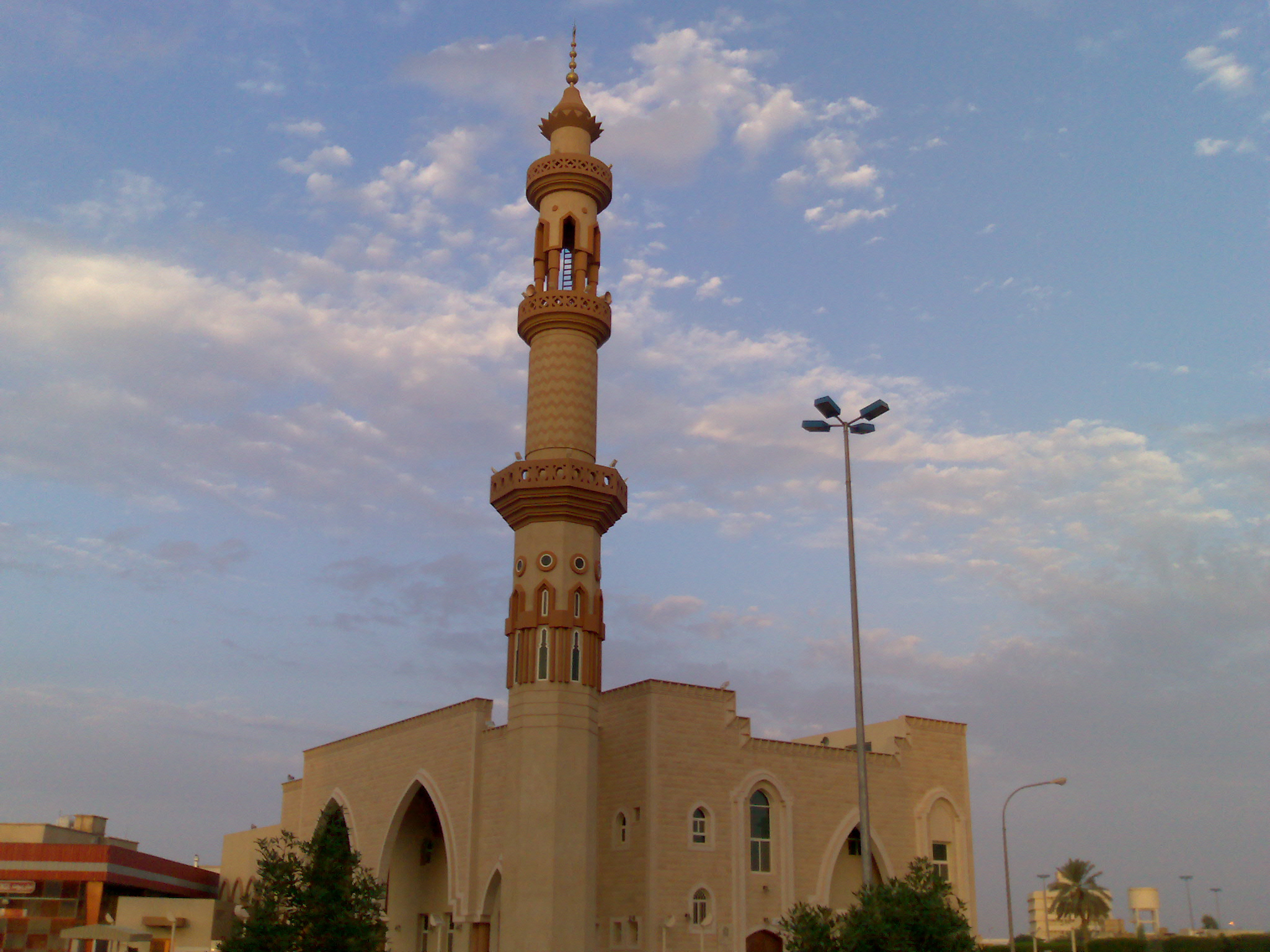
Al Gadhi Mosque

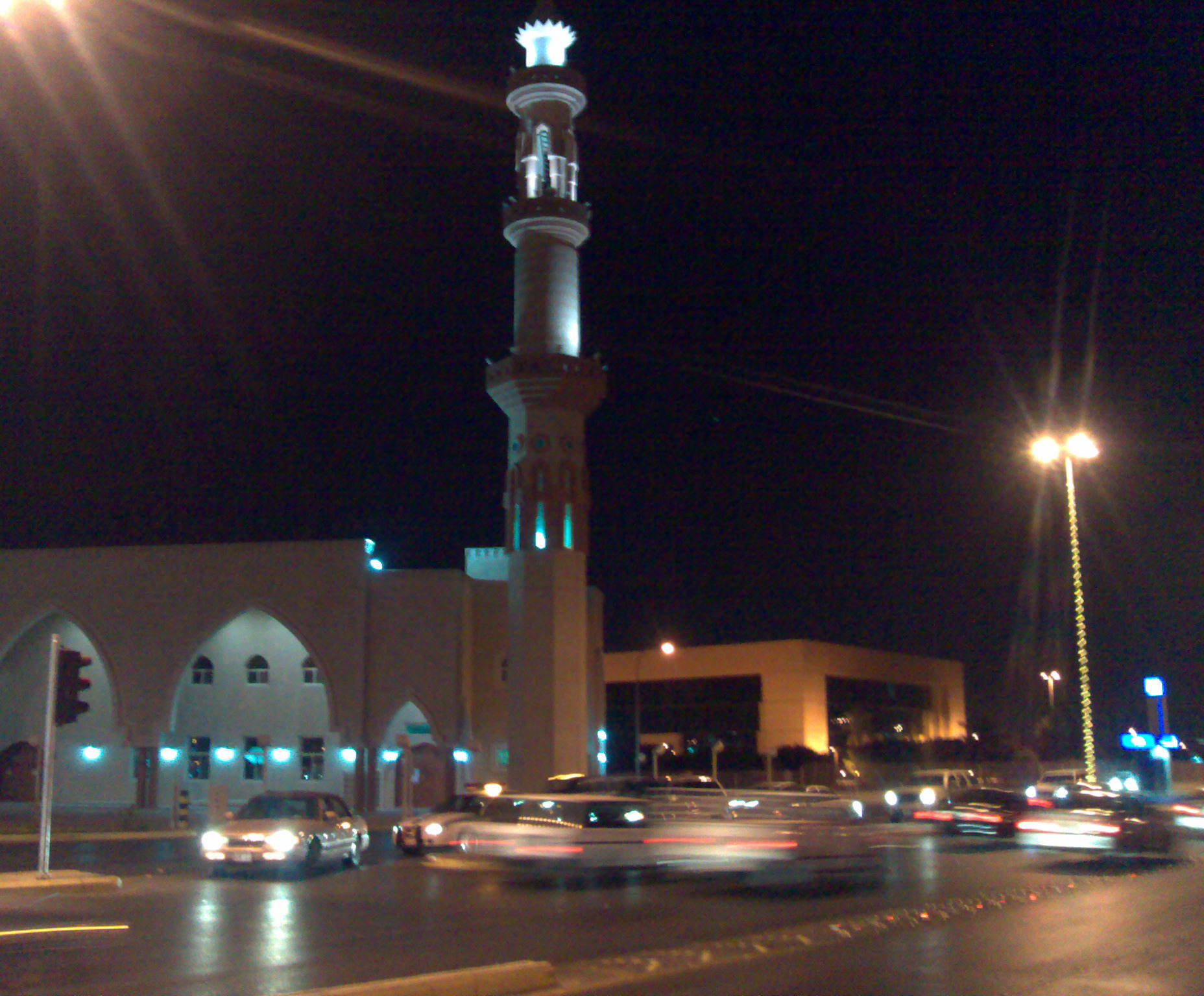
Al Gadhi Mosque and The Municipality Building

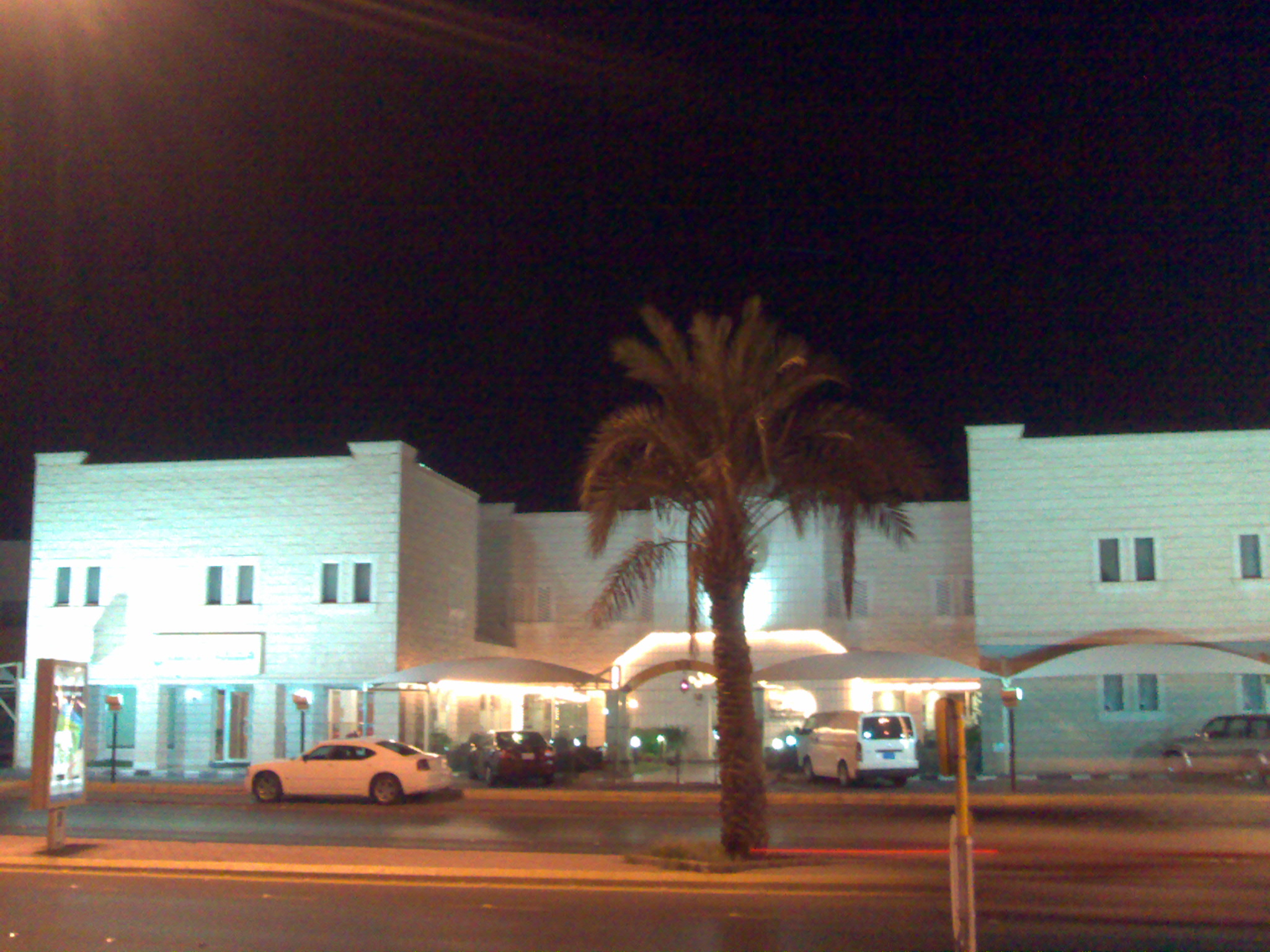
Onaizah Hotel

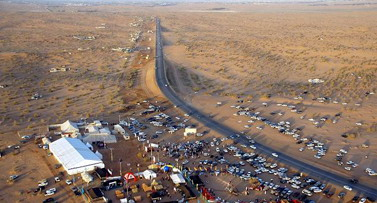
Aerial view of Al Ghadha Desert Festival 2007

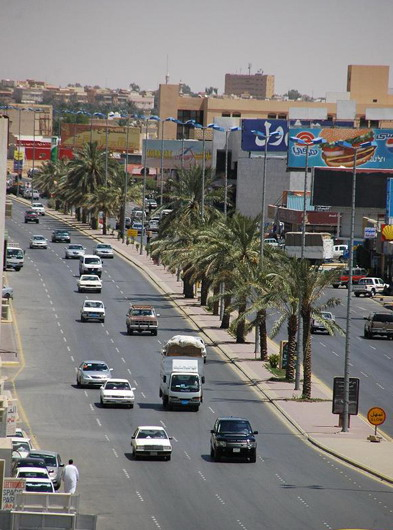
King Abdulaziz Road

== See also ==
- `Anazzah tribe
- 'Unaiza in Husseiniya district, Jordan; with Qal'at 'Unaiza fort (see History of the Hajj: Syrian route) and Uneiza station (see Hejaz Railway)
