= Safaa Thiab =

Iraqi writer

- Born: 1975 (age 50–51); Iraq
- Education: BA in Arabic literature from the University of Baghdad
- Occupation: A poet

Safa Diab an Iraqi writer and author, born in 1975 in Iraq. He obtained a bachelor's degree in Arabic literature from the University of Baghdad, after neglecting his studies at the University of Technology because of his love of studying literature and arts. He is a member of the Iraqi Writers Union.

== Curriculum vitae ==
The Iraqi writer and author Safaa Diab was born in 1975 in Iraq in the Dhi Qar Governorate on the twentieth of January. He obtained bachelor's degree in Arabic literature from the University of Baghdad, after he neglected his studies at the University of Technology because of his love of studying literature and arts. He studied master's degree in Arabic literature at the University of Basra, and completed the preparatory year in it with superiorly. But he could not complete his thesis because he had to leave Iraq in 2008. He worked in a number of local and international newspapers as an editor in the cultural department since 1997. He founded the Masarat magazine, in conjunction with the writer Saad Salloum. He worked as its editor-in-chief. He also founded a number of literary magazines and did not continue to work in them as a Tabasheer magazine and Jadal. He worked as a reporter for a number of cultural sites, the most important of which was the cultural section of the Elaph electronic magazine, and worked on radio and as a reporter for Radio Sawa in the city of Basra. He also worked as deputy editor-in-chief of Tawasul magazine, which issue in favor of the Iraqi Communications and Media Commission in 2006. He is a member of the Iraqi Writers Union, and a member of the Iraqi Photographers Association. Held a number of photographic exhibitions and participated in an other ones. He is a resident in Norway since 2009, after receiving a guest writer's scholarship in the city of Schein, south of Oslo.

== Author's work ==
Do not wake the time, poetry, Cultural Affairs House, Baghdad, 2000.

Qalaq, Dar Al-Waqt, poetry, Baghdad, 2001.

No one except me, poetry, publications of the Iraqi Writers Union, Baghdad, 2005.

A dry sky, poetry, Fadaat House, Amman, Jordan, 2010.
