= Assahra Al Maghribiya =

Arabic newspaper launched in 1989

- Type: Daily
- Owner: Maroc Soir Group
- Founded: 1989; 37 years ago
- Language: Arabic
- Headquarters: Casablanca
- Sister newspapers: Le Matin; La Mañana (defunct); Morocco Times (defunct)
- Website: www.almaghribia.ma

Assahra Al Maghribiya (Arabic: الصحراء المغربية) is a daily Arabic Moroccan newspaper of Maroc Soir Group. The group was acquired by Saudi Arabian media executive Othman Al Omeir. The paper was launched in 1989.

The sister publications of the paper are the royalist francophone Le Matin, the hispanophone La Mañana (defunct) and the online Anglophone newspaper Morocco Times (defunct).
