= Norah Al Shamlan =

Saudi researcher and writer

Norah Saleh Al Shamlan (Arabic: نورة صالح الشملان) is a Saudi researcher and writer born in Unaizah Governorate, Al-Qassim. She has many publications in literature, criticism, and biographies, including: Al-Mutanabbi in the Women's Tent, Princess Noura bint Abdul Rahman Al-Faisal, and The Presence of Absence: Illuminations on the Private Life of King Faisal.

== Education ==
Noura Al-Shamlane was born in Unaizah, Al-Qassim. At the age of three, she moved to Az Zubayr, Iraq, with her father, who worked as a merchant in Basra. She later moved to Basra in the third grade to complete her high school education, from which she graduated in 1965.

She then enrolled in the Faculty of Arts, Department of Arabic Language, at the University of Baghdad, graduating in 1969.

- Master of Arts (M.A.) from the University of Riyadh (now King Saud University) in 1978. Her thesis was titled Abu Dhu'ayb al-Hudhali: His Life and Poetry.
- Doctor of Arts (Ph.D.) from King Saud University in 1987, with first-class honors.
- Professorship in 2000.

== Honors and awards ==
She was honored at the opening of the fourth Unaizah Festival in 2013, along with a group of male and female pioneers in various fields.
