= La Vigie Marocaine =

Defunct newspaper published in Casablanca, Morocco

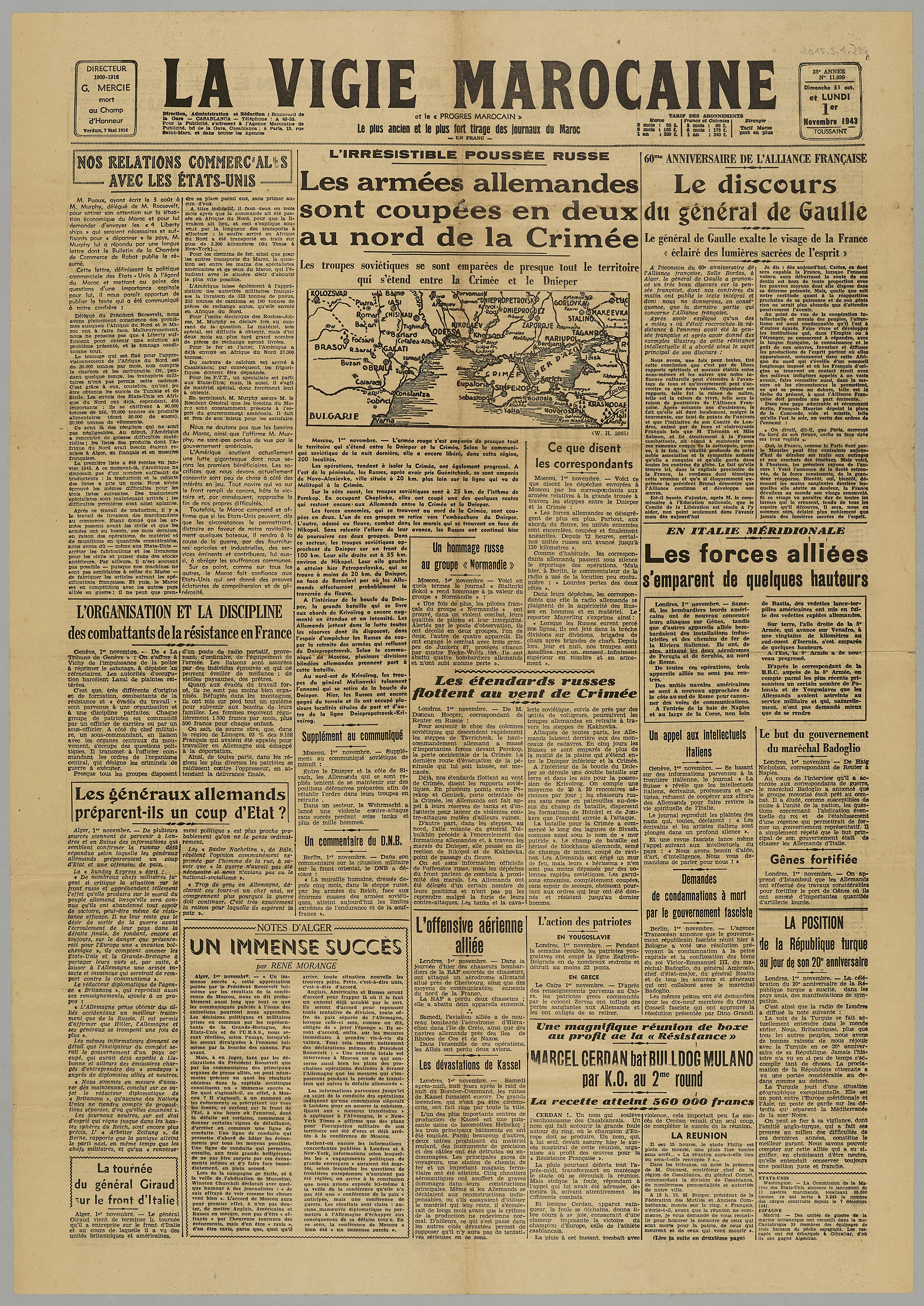
- Owner: Pierre Mas (from 1921)
- Founded: November 28, 1908
- Ceased publication: November 1, 1971
- Language: French

La Vigie Marocaine (1908–1971) was a francophone daily newspaper published by colons in Casablanca, Morocco. It became one of the most important French publications in the period of the French Protectorate.

== History ==
Following the bombardment and military invasion and occupation of Casablanca in 1907, a French daily called La Vigie Marocaine was established by a reporter for the Parisian newspaper Le Matin on November 28, 1908, at the behest of General Albert d'Amade, "for the defense of the interests of and the extension of the influence of France". With a conservative, colonial editorial line that rejected any notion of Moroccan sovereignty and supported the idea of making Morocco an extension of French Algeria. In 1912 in its 682nd issue, the newspaper published:

"Au diable les dissertations politiques, les apprehensions internationales, les approbations de regimes. Parmi ceux qui n'ont pas encore ratifié l'établissement du protectorat, il faut compter le Maroc français. Le 14 Juillet prochain sera le premier où vous pourrez, hardiment et avec un sens complet, hisser notre drapeau tricolore sur la ville marocaine."
"To hell with the political essays, the international apprehensions, and the endorsements of regimes. Among those who have not yet ratified the establishment of the protectorate, Morocco should be considered French. This coming 14th of July will be the first when you will be able to, boldly and meaningfully, hoist our tricolor flag over the Moroccan city."

=== Presse Mas ===
Pierre Mas, founder of the Presse Mas media empire, came to control La Vigie Marocaine through share ownership in 1921. In 1945, Pierre Mas was censured for his newspapers' support for the Vichy regime.

== "Zbib et Barnabé" ==
La Vigie Marocaine published a comic strip by Henri Bruneau entitled "Zbib et Barnabé," which was supposed to celebrate French-Moroccan "companionship." The character Barnabé was white and French; Zbib was a Moroccan of the south depicted in pickaninny caricature, often using vernacular Moroccan Arabic and incorrect French.
