= Al Jazirah (newspaper) =

Saudi Arabian daily newspaper

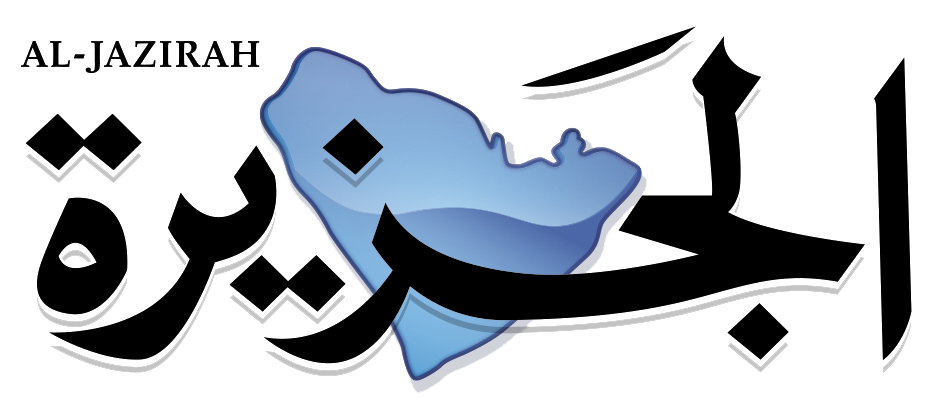
- Type: Daily newspaper
- Format: Broadsheet
- Owner: Mutlaq bin Abdullah
- Founder: Abdullah Ibn Khamis
- Publisher: Al Jazirah Corporation for Press, Printing and Publishing
- Editor-in-chief: Khalid bin Hamd Al Malik
- Founded: 1960; 66 years ago
- Political alignment: Conservative and pro-Islamic; pro-government
- Language: Arabic
- Headquarters: Riyadh
- Sister newspapers: Al Masaiya
- Website: al-jazirah.com

Al Jazirah (Arabic: الجزيرة, lit. 'the Island' or 'the Peninsula') is a daily Arabic newspaper published in Riyadh, Saudi Arabia. Its sister newspaper is Al Masaiya, which is the only afternoon newspaper in the country with limited influence and readership.

The paper is published in broadsheet format with 48 pages, both colour and black and white contents. It has more than thirty national and international branches.

== History and profile ==
Al Jazirah was established in 1960 by Al Jazirah Corporation which was owned by Abdullah Ibn Khamis. It was started as a monthly publication.

The chairman of the newspaper is Mutlaq bin Abdullah. Othman Al Omeir, owner of the liberal Arabic e-newspaper Elaph, was a member of the paper's board of directors. Furthermore, he was a sport correspondent in the early 1970s and later, London correspondent of the paper. In 1977, Abdel Rahman Al Rashid was appointed editor-in-chief of the daily, who also served as a correspondent and as its Washington bureau chief from 1981 to 1985. As of 2013 the editor-in-chief of the newspaper was Khalid bin Hamd Al Malik.

Al Jazirah was considered by the Anti-Defamation League to be editorially conservative as well as pro-Islamic.

== Circulation ==
The paper is said to have a limited circulation and is not widespread in contrast to the other Saudi papers. However, it is widely distributed in Saudi Arabia and in other Arab and European countries. Global Investment House reported the market share of the paper as around 6.0% in November 2009. In 2008, Al Jazirah became the first Saudi daily which reported its subscription numbers and sales. It is also the first Saudi newspaper to announce its circulation figures quoting the National Distribution Company, a third party company owned equally by Saudi newspapers. The paper underwent its first circulation audit in November 2009.

Al Jazirah sold 4,500 copies in 1975. The paper had a circulation of 85,000 copies in 2001. The daily's circulation was given as 93,000 by Western media observers in 2002. The estimated circulation of the paper in 2003 was 80,000 copies. In 2007 the paper sold 110,000 copies according to the report by World Association of Newspapers. The confirmed circulation of the paper was more than 131,000 copies in June 2008. The circulation of the daily, which was confirmed by the BPA, was 125,415 copies for the last six months of 2011. For the first six-month period of 2013 the paper sold 123,097 copies.

== Influence and awards ==
It is argued that Al Jazirah is one of four leading Saudi daily newspapers along with Al Watan, Al Riyadh and Al Madina.

The paper was awarded the best print prize in Asia by IFRA in Manila in 2007, and its website was awarded the digital excellence award by the Saudi Ministry of Communications and Information Technology the same year. In addition, the editors of the paper were invited by the World Association of Newspapers to its 2007 conference held in South Africa. It was the first invitation of the association for a Saudi daily.

== Content ==
Al Jazirah usually publishes reports and interviews concerning national, Arab and international issues. The paper is mostly known for its daily supplements on different topics such as economy, sports, culture, computers, medicine and science. It also has a weekly supplement, Telecom and Digital World, and carries cartoons. The Arab Press Network states that the paper extensively covers the activities of the ruling Saudi family and adopts an uncritical approach towards the government's policies on most of its 60 daily pages. It is further discussed that its columnists and the debate they initiate are both weak.

The minister of health Ghazi Al Gosaibi's poem written for King Fahd, entitled "A Pen Bought and Sold", was published on the front page of the paper in 1984. In the poem, Al Gosaibi indirectly accused the ruling elites, including Prince Sultan, then minister of defense, of corruption and Saudi Oger of improper tender activities regarding the public hospitals. King Fahd fired him after reading the poem.

On 7 February 1999, the newspaper published a rare interview with a senior Saudi royal woman, Haya bint Saad Al Sudairi, who was one of King Abdulaziz's spouses, as part of the centennial celebrations of Riyadh's capture by him. In the interview she said "whatever has been and will be said about the King [Abdulaziz] cannot reflect the [whole] truth."

In January 2002, Al Jazirah published a commentary entitled "Why Pork Is Forbidden?" by Muhammad bin Saad al Shuwayir, who stated that the transformation of the Jews into apes and pigs was a punishment "because monkeys and pigs were considered among the lowliest of animals, in nature and manners". He further stated that Jews always represented "human lowness, as expressed in the Quran".

Al Jazirah and other pro-Saudi publications such as Al-Hayat, Asharq Al-Awsat and Okaz uncovered the position of Saudi Arabia concerning a potential invasion of Iraq by the United States in 2002. These media outlets advised Iraqi President Saddam Hussein either to resign or to commit suicide to avoid an American invasion.

On 24 March 2012, Jasser Abdulaziz al Jasser, a columnist of Al Jazirah, criticised Russia, especially foreign minister Sergey Lavrov, for supporting the Alawite minority rule by Ba'athist Syria over its Sunni majority. Al Jasser argued that the same tactics used by Russia to oppress Muslim majorities in Chechnya and the Caucasus were employed by Bashar al-Assad to oppress the Sunni majority in Syria.

Al Jazirah's front page on 17 June 2012 was entirely in black and white to pay respect to Crown Prince Nayef bin Abdulaziz, who died in Geneva the previous day.

== Controversy ==
In September 2008, a reporter of the paper, Fahd Al Jukhaidib, wrote an article in which he described frequent power cuts in Qubba in northern Saudi Arabia. The article also informed the readers about a protest in front of the government-owned electricity company as a result of the power cuts. Upon publication of his article, he was sentenced in October 2008 to two months in prison and 50 lashes for inciting the public to protest against a series of electric power reductions. He was freed on appeal in 2009.

== Innovation ==
Al Jazirah was the first Saudi daily to launch an online website in 1996. It was also the first daily paper in the Middle East to launch a mobile phone application, which had more than 50,000 users in 2013. In addition to these technological innovations, Al Jazirah also launched the first online women's daily covering female achievements in Saudi Arabia, latest developments and other topics related to women.

In 2013, the daily cooperated with Goss International for refurbishment, upgrading its print capacity and relocating to a new venture.

== See also ==
- List of newspapers in Saudi Arabia
