= Othman Al Omeir =

Saudi Arabian origin British businessman (born 1950)

- Born: 1950 (age 75–76); Al Zulfi
- Education: University of Madinah
- Occupations: Journalist and editor
- Years active: 1970s–present

Othman Al Omeir (Arabic: عثمان العمير; born 1950) is a Saudi-born British businessman, journalist and editor. He is considered to be close to several Saudi rulers, including the incumbent King Salman and former rulers King Fahd, King Hassan II and Hassan bin Talal.

== Early life and education ==
Al Omeir was born in Al Zulfi in 1950. His father was a Qutab teacher for a mosque in Al Zulfi. Al Omeir is a graduate of Madinah University.

== Journalism ==
Al Omeir began his career as a junior sports correspondent for Al Jazirah newspaper in Saudi Arabia in the early 1970s. Soon, he became managing editor and London correspondent of the paper. During his time as the London correspondent, he studied the English language, and his tenure lasted until 1983. He then began to serve as editor-in-chief of The Majalla magazine from 1983 to 1987. Next, he became editor-in-chief of Alsharq Alawsat and worked in this post for ten years. Both The Majalla and Alsharq Alawsat are owned by the Saudi Research and Marketing Group. He also worked as the editor-in-chief of Al Yaum and was a member of the board of directors of Al Jazirah. During his journalism career, he interviewed major world leaders, including George W. Bush, Margaret Thatcher, Helmut Kohl, Jacques Chirac, Mikhail Gorbachev and King Fahd.

On 21 May 2001, he launched the first independent Arabic e-newspaper, Elaph, based in London. London was chosen as the center of the website to be free from the censorship rules of Saudi Arabia and also to offer liberal viewpoints, particularly in opposition to religious radicalism. Al Omeir continues his interviews in Elaph. In July 2013 he interviewed Bahraini ruler King Hamad.

In September 2021 Al Omeir launched the Arabic version of How to Spend It, a weekly luxury magazine by Financial Times. HTSI Arabic is also published in London like Elaph.

== Business activities ==
He established a media company in the United Kingdom, OR Media Limited, in partnership with Abdulrahman Al Rashed. He acquired the Maroc Soir Group, a major publisher in Casablanca, in March 2004. The group which is the oldest media group in Morocco owns French-daily paper Le Matin, Arabic daily Assahra Al Maghribiya, English news portal moroccotimes.com, and Spanish weekly La Manana. In November 2005, the group launched a French-language daily, Maroc Soir. In Morocco, he founded Mena Media Consulting in 2004/2005, a public relations firm. He is chairman of the Strategic Communications Group.

== Awards ==
Al Omeir was named as the Media Personality of 2006 by the Arab Media Forum in Dubai for his contribution to the industry in the Arab world. He was awarded the Media Man of the Year Prize by the same forum in 2007, and also received the Media Innovation Prize by the Arab Thought Foundation in the same year. In December 2009, he was awarded the New Media for the Future Prize by the Anna Lindh Foundation. He is a member of Moroccan Royal Academy. In December 2011, he was nominated for the International Media Awards 2012 by the Next Century Foundation.

== Works ==
- End-of-Century Dialogues: Interviews with Arab and International Political Leaders and Decision-Makers, 1996.
