= Abdul-Rahman al-Sa'di =

Islamic Scholar from Saudi Arabia (1889-1957)

ʿAbd al-Raḥmān al-Saʿdī
- عبد الرحمن السعدي
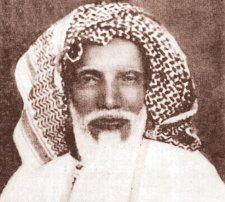

Personal life
- Born: September 7, 1889 Unayzah, Emirate of Nejd
- Died: January 24, 1957 (aged 67) Unayzah, Saudi Arabia
- Home town: Unayzah, Saudi Arabia
- Notable work: Taysir al-Kareem al-Rahman

Religious life
- Religion: Islam
- Denomination: Sunni
- Jurisprudence: Hanbali
- Creed: Athari
- Movement: Salafism

Muslim leader
- Influenced by: Ibn Taymiyya; Ibn Qayyim al-Jawziyya
- Influenced: Ibn Uthaymin

Sheikh Abdul Rahman bin Nasser Al-Saadi (Arabic: الشيخ عبد الرحمن بن ناصر السعدي), also known as al-Siʿdī (1889–1957), was an Islamic Scholar from Saudi Arabia. He was a teacher and an author in Unaizah, Saudi Arabia. He authored more than 40 books in several different fields including tafsir, fiqh, and 'aqida. al-Sa'di was an influential figure in the field of tafsir and his book of tafsir entitled Taysir al-Kareem al-Rahman has been described as arguably one of the most popular tafsirs written by modern Salafi scholars. He served as the Imam and Khatib for the largest jami' mosque and director of the religious training school, al-Ma'had al-'Ilmi, of Unayzah.

== Early life ==
Al-Sa'di was born in the city of Unayzah, al-Qassim, Saudi Arabia on 7 September 1889. His father, Nasir al-Sa'di, was an imam and preacher in a mosque in the Unayzah. His mother, Fatimah bint Abdullah al-'Uthaymeen, died when he was four years old, and his father died when he was seven. He was initially cared for by his father's second wife and was later transferred to the guardianship of his oldest brother, Hamad ibn Nasir al-Sa'di. He completed his memorization of the Qur'an by the age of eleven and then pursued religious education from the scholars in his locality. In his teenage years, his fellow students began to refer to him for help in their studies.

== Teachers ==
Al-Sa'di had a number of teachers. These included

- Sheikh Muhammad Abdul-Kareem ibn Shibl, under whom he studied fiqh, usool al-fiqh, and the Arabic language
- Sheikh Abdullah ibn A'idh, under whom he studied fiqh, usool al-fiqh, and the Arabic language
- Sheikh Ibrahim ibn Hamad ibn Jasir, under whom he studied tafsir, hadeeth and hadeeth sciences
- Sheikh Sa'b al-Tuwayjiri, under whom he studied fiqh and usool al-fiqh
- Sheikh Ali ibn Muhammad al-Nasaa'i, under whom he studied usool al-deen
- Sheikh Ali ibn Nasir ibn Wadi, under whom he studied hadeeth, tafsir, usool al-tafsir, and usool al-hadeeth, and was also granted ijazah in the six books of hadeeth
- Sheikh Muhammad al-Ameen al-Shinqiti, under whom he studied tafsir, hadeeth, mustalah al-hadeeth, and the Arabic language
- Sheikh Salih ibn Uthman Aal al-Qadhi, under whom he studied tawheed, tafsir, fiqh, and the Arabic language
- Sheikh Muhammad al-Mani', under whom he studied the Arabic language
- Sheikh Ibrahim ibn Salih ibn Isa, under whom he studied usool al-deen

With each of his primary teachers, he studied their respective fields of expertise, as ibn Shibl, ibn A'idh, al-Tuwayjiri and Salih ibn Uthman were each experts in fiqh and usool al-fiqh; ibn Wadi and ibn Jasir were experts in tafsir, hadeeth and hadeeth sciences; al-Nasaa'i was a specialist in al-tawheed; and al-Shinqiti and al-Mani' were experts in the Arabic language.

Al-Sa'di's teachers had studied in a number of different regions including the Hijaz, Egypt, Iraq, Syria, India and Mauritania. In this way, he was exposed to a number of different sources of knowledge outside of his own Najd region without having had to travel.

Out of his teachers, al-Sa'di studied the most under sheikh Salih ibn Uthman Aal al-Qadhi (judge of Unayzah and imam of its Jami' mosque) and remained a regular student of his until al-Qadhi's death in 1932/1351AH.

Al-Sa'di studied under sheikh Muhammad al-Ameen al-Shinqiti when al-Shinqiti came to teach in Unayzah in 1911/1330AH. He also showed great interest in the writings of ibn Taymiyah and ibn al-Qayyim and was significantly influenced by their works.

== Professional life ==
Al-Sa'di began formally teaching at the age of 23. He continued attending classes as a student while simultaneously teaching his own classes until 1931 when he dedicated himself entirely to teaching, writing, and delivering fatawa.

In 1935, al-Sa'di completed his 8 volume complete tafsir of the Qur'an, entitled Taysir al-Kareem al-Rahman. Taysir al-Kareem al-Rahman has been described as arguably one of the most popular tafsirs written by modern salafi scholars.

In 1941, al-Sa'di established a public library in Unayzah with funds provided by the governor. This library was built as an extension of the city's jami' mosque and was the first public library in all of the Najd region of Saudi Arabia.

In 1941, al-Sa'di was appointed to be the qadhi (judge) of Unayzah, however he declined this position. In Ramadan 1942/1361AH, he was appointed as the primary imam and khateeb for the city's largest jami' mosque, a role which he held until his death in 1956. Historically, this role had been linked to the position of qadhi (judge) for the city, such that the imam of the jami' mosque would also be the city's qadhi, however al-Sa'di declined this position and the two roles have been distinct and separate since his time.

In 1953, al-Sa'di was appointed as the education director of the religious training school, al-Ma'had al-'Ilmi, of Unayzah. Despite being offered a salary of 1000 riyal per month for this position (a significant sum at that time), al-Sa'di wrote to the center's director to accept the position without requiring any payment.

=== Embrace of New Technologies ===
Al-Sa'di was notable for his embrace and advocacy of new technologies in the service of spreading religious knowledge. Al-Sa'di was the first person to introduce loud speakers to the city of Unayzah, which was initially met with some resistance. In response, he delivered a khutbah via loud speaker regarding the benefits of using modern technologies for spreading religious knowledge. In 1955, al-Sa'di wrote a book entitled "The Qur'anic Proofs that Beneficial Contemporary Sciences are Part of Islam" This book argues that modern scientific and industrial knowledge fell within the scope of Islam, in response to some contemporary claims to the contrary.

=== Concern for Contemporary Issues ===
Al-Sa'di took interest in a number of contemporary issues. In 1956, he authored a small work dedicated to clarifying the prohibitions of smoking and its spiritual, physical, and monetary harms. He also held that the relatively novel practice of organ transplantation was permissible under Islamic law.

== Fiqh ==
Al-Sa'di was originally trained in the Hanbali madhab, the predominant madhab of the Najd region in which he lived. In his youth he wrote a 400 line didactic poem on Hanbali fiqh rulings. Influenced by writings of ibn Taymiyah and ibn al-Qayyim, he sometimes selected fiqh positions outside of the dominant position of the Hanbali madhab. He usually adopted the positions of ibn Taymiyah.

== Notable Students ==
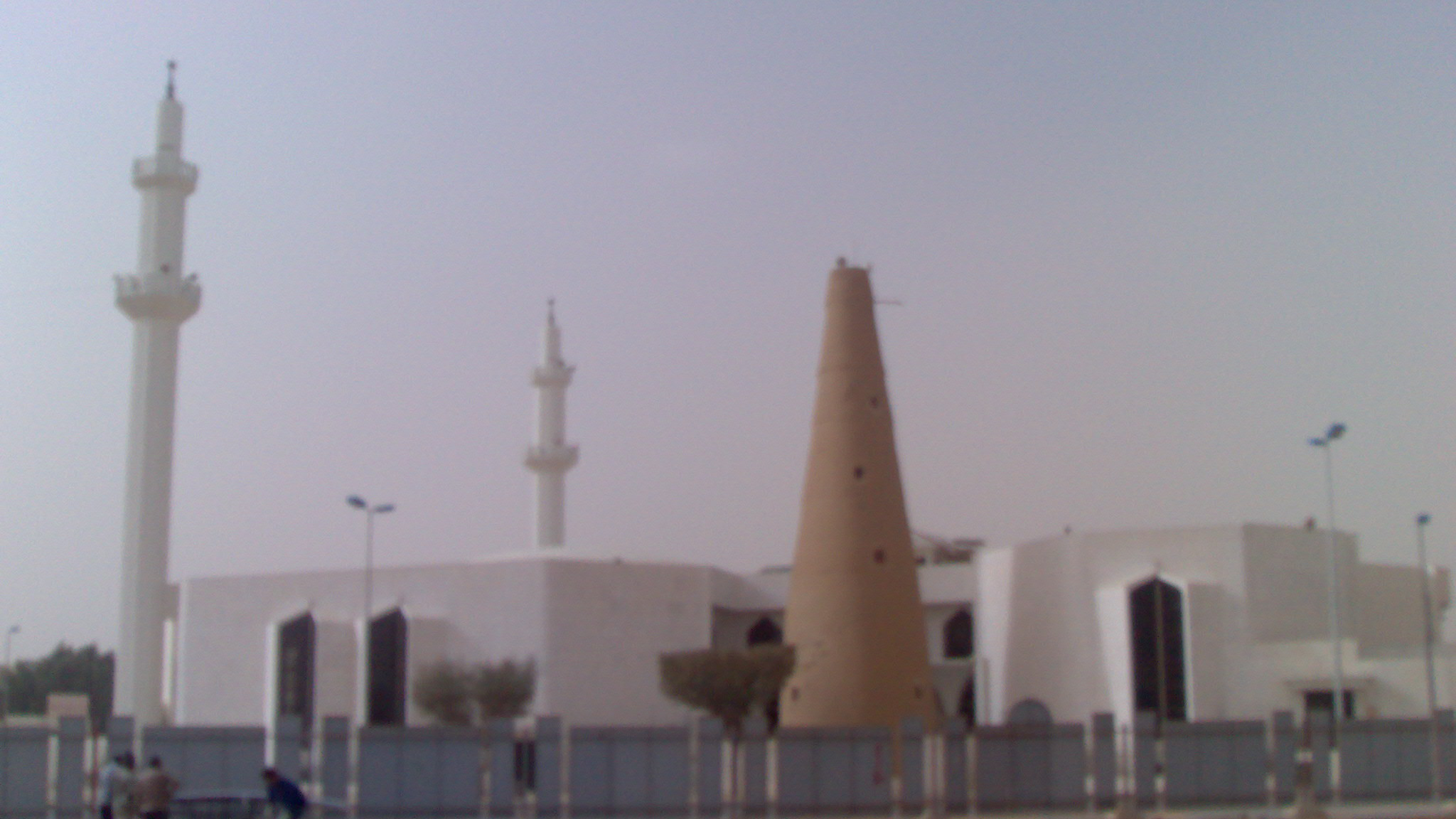
The Jami' Mosque of Unayzah, today referred to as the "Ibn Uthaymin Mosque"

Al-Sa'di taught at least 35 students who went on to become imams, khateebs, judges, or teachers. One biographic encyclopedia of the scholars of the Najd region listed 140 of his students. Two of his most famous students were Sheikh Muhammad ibn Salih al-'Uthaymeen and Sheikh Abdullah Aqeel. al-Sa'di appointed al-'Uthaymeen to take over his role as the teacher and khateeb of the jami' mosque after his death.

Al-Sa'di's reputation as a teacher and author attracted students not only from the al-Qassim region but also from a number of other regions. He regularly received and responded to letters asking for fatwa from other countries in the Arabian Peninsula and Indian Subcontinent. One large volume of al-Sa'di's fatawa that had been given in his letters and foreign correspondences was posthumously compiled and published under the time of al-Fatawa al-Sa'diyyah. Al-Sa'di's influence and popularity during his own lifetime has been, in part, attributed to his early embrace of new technologies for spreading religious knowledge.

== Written works ==
Al-Sa'di' authored more than 40 written works in multiple fields including tafsir, fiqh, hadith, and 'aqeedah. The majority of his written works were authored after he reached the age of 40.

=== Original works ===
Some of his original works include:

- Taysir al-Kareem al-Rahman, a tafsir of the entire Qur'an
- Taysir al-Lateef al-Mannaan, a thematic tafsir of selected portions of the Qur'an
- Qawa'id al-Hisan li-Tafsir al-Qur'an, a work on the principles of tafsir
- al-Tawdheeh w'al-Bayan li-Shajarah al-Eemaan, a work of 'aqeedah
- Mukhtasir al-Usool al-Fiqh, a work on the principles of fiqh
- Bahjah al-Quloob al-Abrar, an explanation of 99 comprehensive hadith statements
- Manhaj al-Salikeen, a work of fiqh

=== Explanations ===
- al-Haqq al-Wadhih al-Mubeen fee Sharh Tawheed al-Anbiyaa w'al-Mursaleen, a work of 'aqeedah, which is an explanation of a portion of Nooniyah by ibn al-Qayyim
- Tawdheeh al-Kafiyyah al-Shafiyyah, a rewriting of ibn al-Qayyim's Nooniyah poem in prose format
- al-Qawl al-Sadeed fee Maqasid al-Tawheed, an explanation of Muhammad ibn Abdul-Wahab's Kitab al-Tawheed
- al-Tanbihat al-Latifah, an explanation of ibn Taymiyah's al-'Aqeedah al-Wasitiyyah

=== English Translations of al-Sa'di's works ===
A number of al-Sa'di's works have been translated into English, including

- Tafseer al-Sa'di (10 Volume Set), a translation of Taysir al-Kareem al-Rahman
- The Way of Truth: A Poem of Creed and Manner, a translation of the poem al-Manhaj al-Haqq
- The Exquisite Pearl, a translation of al-Durr al-Bahiyyah
- Maxims of Fiqh, a translation of al-Qawa'id al-Fiqhiyyah
- The Tree of Faith, a translation of al-Tawdheeh w'al-Bayan li-Shajarah al-Eemaan
- Lesson learnt from the story of Yusuf, a translation of Fawa'id Mustanbitah min Qissah Yusuf

== Illness and death ==
In 1950, al-Sa'di began suffering from health problems related to blood pressure and atherosclerosis. Upon hearing of his health problems, King Sa'ud sent two doctors via his personal jet to attend to sheikh al-Sa'di. The doctors recommended that he seek further treatment in Lebanon, where they accompanied him for a month-long stay in 1953/1373AH. During this time he recovered but was advised to adopt a less strenuous lifestyle. After returning to Unayzah, he resumed his regular work as an imam, teacher, khateeb and author. Al-Sa'di died from the same set of health problems in 1957/1376AH.

== Controversies ==
In 1940, al-Sa'di wrote a short book on the subject of Ya'juj wa Ma'juj in which he argued based on both religious and geographic evidence that the nations of Ya'juj and Ma'juj had already escaped their barrier, left their confines and mixed with other disbelieving nations. News of al-Sa'di's claims in this work spread throughout Najd, resulting in strong disagreements between those who agreed with al-Sa'di's conclusions and those who opposed them, and al-Sa'di was subject to some abuse and criticism by his peers as a result. The disagreement persisted as news spread until the issue was raised with King Abdul-Aziz, who then sent for al-Sa'di to meet with him in Riyadh. al-Sa'di traveled alone to meet the King where he was greeted with hospitality by the King and a number of scholars gathered there. The King asked al-Sa'di to leave the issue because of the disturbances that it had causes, and al-Sa'di agreed to do so, saying that he had not anticipated such issue would arise from a minor issue of scholarly investigation. al-Sa'di did not ultimately publish this book or mention any of the issues it contained in subsequent teaching or written works, though he is not known to have publicly renounced these positions.

Al-Sa'di was the first person to introduce loud speakers to the city of Unayzah, which was initially met with some resistance. In response, he delivered a khutbah via loud speaker regarding the benefits of using modern technologies for spreading religious knowledge.

Al-Sa'di held organ transplants to be permissible, which was a controversial ruling in his era.

== Legacy ==
In November 2019, Qassim University hosted a two-day conference entitled "The Illustrious Sheikh 'Abdur-Rahman al-Sa'di and His Influence on Religious Knowledge and Propagation." This conference was inaugurated by president of the General Presidency for the Affairs of the Two Holy Mosques Abdul-Rahman al-Sudais, and also included speeches by former Grand Mufti of Saudi Arabia Abdul-Aziz ibn Abdullah Al Shaykh, member of the Council of Senior Scholars Saad al-Shithri, and the governor of al-Qassim region. The stated goal of this conference was to cast light upon al-Sa'di legacy and encourage further research into his thought and legal reasoning.

Al-Sa'di left behind three sons, Abdullah, Muhammad and Ahmad. Abdullah al-Sa'di (died 1984/1405AH) was also a student of knowledge and published some of the writings of his father posthumously.

== See also ==
- Muhammad ibn al-Uthaymeen
- Abd al-Aziz ibn Baz
- Muhammad Nasiruddin al-Albani
