= Al Yaum (newspaper) =

Saudi Arabian newspaper

- Type: Daily newspaper
- Format: Broadsheet
- Owner(s): Dar Al Yaum for Press, Printing and Publishing
- Publisher: Dar Al Yaum for Press, Printing and Publishing
- Editor-in-chief: Sulaiman Aba Hussain
- Founded: 1965; 61 years ago
- Political alignment: Pro-government
- Language: Arabic
- Headquarters: Dammam
- OCLC number: 42316367
- Website: Al Yaum

Al Yaum (Arabic: اليوم; The Day or Today) is a Dammam-based, supposedly pro-government Arabic daily newspaper published in Dammam, Saudi Arabia. The paper has been in circulation since 1965.

== History and ownership ==
Al Yaum was first published in Dammam in 1965. Initially, it was a weekly eight-page magazine. Its frequency and size increased over time, becoming a daily newspaper in 1978. The owner and publisher of the paper is Dar Al Yaum Organization for Printing and Publishing. The headquarters of Al Yaum is in Dammam.

Hamid Ghuyarfi served as the editor-in-chief of Al Yaum until 1981 when he was dismissed due to his criticism against the Saudi government. One of the other former editors-in-chief was Othman Al Omeir who is the owner of the liberal Arabic news portal Elaph. Muhammad Abdallah Al Wail also served as the editor-in-chief of the paper.

Al Yaum was the first publication in the Middle East and the second in the world to get an IFRA ISO certificate, the first in the Middle East to receive the IFRA Asia Award for best in print, and the first in the Middle East to become a WAN-IFRA Star Club member and a Color Quality Club member.

== Content and format ==
Being a native paper of the Eastern Province Al Yaum critically covered negative living conditions of local people in the region before the Qatif uprising in 1979.

The paper mostly covers news in relation to Dammam and nearby regions. It also covers regional news, sports events, and social issues that are of interest to the readers in Saudi Arabia and Arab states of the Persian Gulf. The paper is published in broadsheet format with 28 colour and black and white pages.

== Distribution and circulation ==
Although the paper focuses on the local news and mainly serves the Eastern province, it is distributed across the Persian Gulf region. It is the leading newspaper in the Eastern province.

The paper sold 6,000 copies in 1975. The estimated 2003 circulation of Al Yaum was 80,000 copies. Its 2007 circulation was 135,000 copies.

== Bans and arrests ==
Although the daily is described as pro-government, it has experienced suspensions and arrests of its correspondents. In 1982, one of its reporters was detained for two years. In May of the same year, the paper was suspended by the Saudi government due to its association with progressive and leftist young writers who were close to the Communist Party in Saudi Arabia and the Socialist Action Party in the Arabian Peninsula (Hizb alʿamal al-ishtiraki fi al-jazira al-ʿarabiyya).

== See also ==
- List of newspapers in Saudi Arabia
