= Alyahya =

The Alyahya dynasty (Arabic: أسرة اليحيا), also known as Al-Yahya Al-Saleh, is an Arab dynasty from Unaizah, a major city in the Al-Qassim Province of Saudi Arabia in the historical Najd plateau. The family served as rulers and prominent leaders of Unaizah across several periods from the mid-nineteenth century and ruled the city as its Emirs from 1308 to 1322 AH (approximately 1890 to 1904 CE). They are among the historically significant families of the Qassim region, playing a major role in the political, military, and administrative life of Unaizah.

== Origins and tribal affiliation ==
The Alyahya family belongs to the Al Abu Ghannam lineage, descending from Masrour bin Zuhair bin Jarrah of the Bani Thor section of the Subaea tribe. In Unaizah, the family is specifically referred to as Al-Yahya Al-Saleh to distinguish them from another family of the same name, Al-Yahya Al Abu Al-Shahm of Al-Rawaghen, who are also descended from Zuhair bin Jarrah.

== Pre-emirate role in Unaizah ==
Before formally holding the emirate, the Alyahya family held the leadership of the Khereysa quarter (حملة الخريزة) of Unaizah, one of the city's three main civic divisions, each led by a prominent family and each maintaining its own banner in times of war.

=== Yahya es-Salih ===
The most celebrated figure of the pre-emirate era was Yahya es-Salih (Yahya Al-Saleh). The British explorer Charles Montagu Doughty, who visited Unaizah in 1878 and personally knew the family, described him as "a busy patriot and sheykh of the bold Khereysy." Doughty personally visited the Alyahya household multiple times, writing: "In these new friends I saw a right Arabian family."

Yahya es-Salih played a leading role in Unaizah's civic affairs during a turbulent period of the city's history in the mid-nineteenth century, when the city experienced a series of political and military upheavals common across the Najd region during that era. His son Abdullah el-Yahya fought alongside Zamil Al-Sulaim in defense of the city during these conflicts. Doughty wrote of Abdullah's indispensable role: "without Abdullah el-Yahya, Zamil did nothing at Aneyza." Doughty also recorded that a song was composed in Yahya's honor for his courage during this period.

=== Abdullah ibn Yahya ibn Seleym as Emir ===
Doughty records that during the wars of the 1269–1270 AH period, the Emir of Unaizah was Abdullah ibn Yahya ibn Seleym. This is the earliest Western documentation of the Alyahya family holding the emirate of Unaizah.

== The Alyahya Emirate of Unaizah (1308–1322 AH / 1890–1904 CE) ==
Following the Battle of Al-Mulaida in 1308 AH (1891 CE), a significant engagement in the political history of the Najd region, the people of Unaizah agreed on Abdullah bin Yahya Al-Saleh Al-Yahya as their Emir, chosen from the Al Abu Ghannam lineage of the Subaea tribe.

=== Abdullah bin Yahya — Emir 1308–1312 AH (c. 1890–1894) ===
Served as Emir of Unaizah from 1308 AH until his death in 1312 AH.

=== Saleh bin Yahya — Emir 1312–1317 AH (c. 1894–1899) ===
Succeeded his brother as Emir of Unaizah, serving until 1317 AH.

=== Hamad bin Abdullah — Emir 1317–1322 AH (c. 1899–1904) ===
He was the third Alyahya Emir of Unaizah, taking office in 1317 AH. His emirate lasted until 1322 AH.

== After the emirate ==
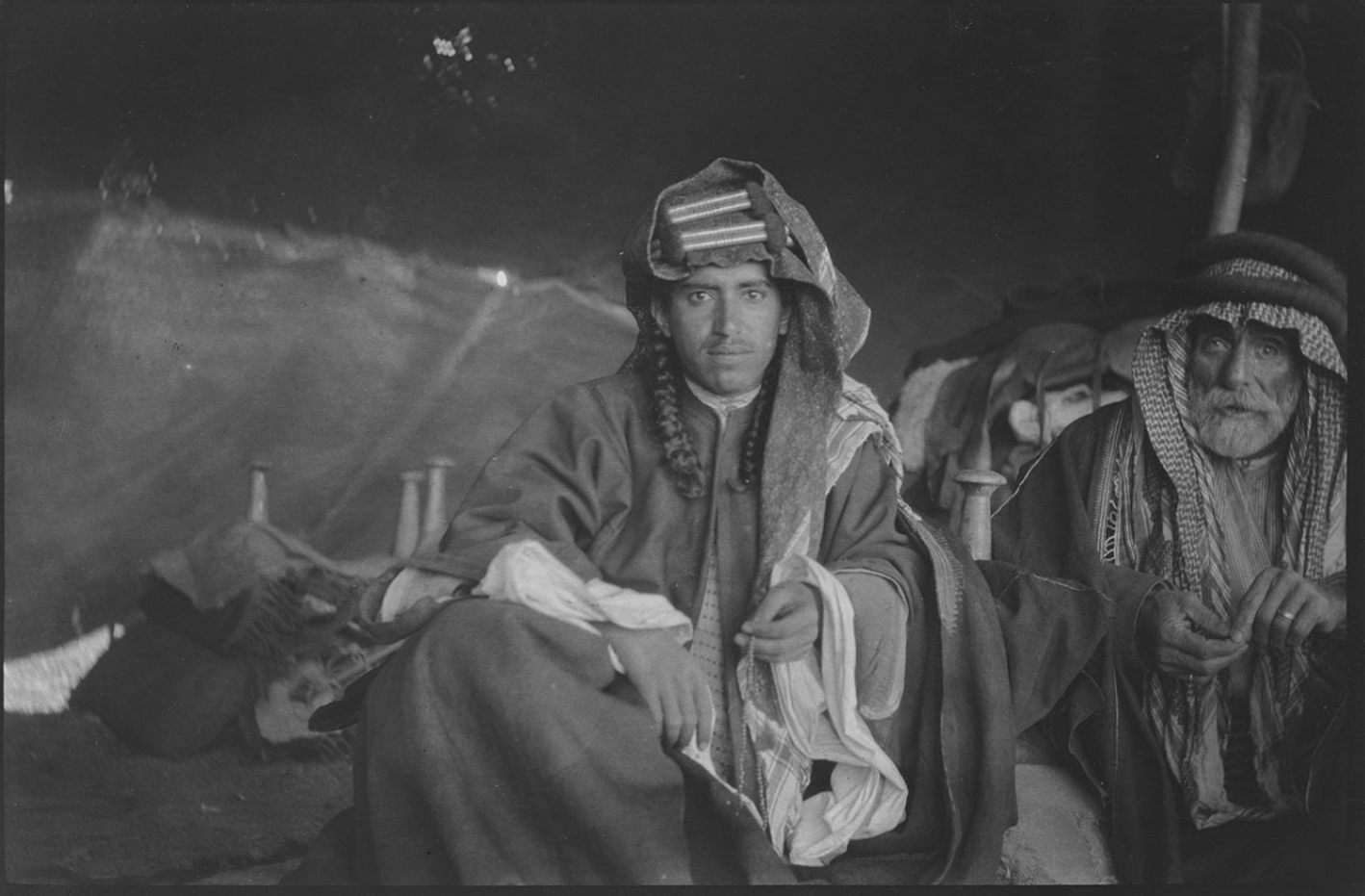
Abdullah bin Abdul Rahman Al-Yahya, photographed in Ha'il by Gertrude Bell, February-March 1914

Following the events of 1322 AH, members of the Alyahya family relocated to Ha'il. The British explorer Gertrude Bell photographed Abdullah bin Abdul Rahman Al-Yahya, a member of the family, alongside Muhammad al-Ma'rawi during her 1913–1914 Arabian expedition to Ha'il. The photograph, captioned by Bell herself, is held at the Gertrude Bell Archive, Newcastle University, and dated 25 February to 7 March 1914.

Despite the transition of the emirate, the Alyahya family continued to hold positions of distinction under King Abdulaziz's unified Saudi state, reflecting their continued standing and service to the Kingdom.

=== Governors from the Alyahya family ===
Following the unification of the Kingdom, several members of the Alyahya family were appointed to governorship positions by King Abdulaziz. Ibrahim bin Yahya Al-Saleh Al-Yahya served as Emir of Umluj circa 1343 AH. Abdullah bin Muhammad Al-Yahya served as Emir of Umluj from 1348 to 1350 AH. Ahmad bin Muhammad bin Yahya Al-Yahya served as Emir of Tarbah in 1354 AH and was later appointed Emir of Al-Wajh, serving from 1364 to 1367 AH.

=== Al-Aqilat trade networks ===
Beyond governance, members of the family participated in the Al-Aqilat trade networks, the historic merchant caravans that connected Najd to Iraq and the wider Arab world, further establishing their presence and influence beyond the Qassim region.

== See also ==
- Unaizah
- Al-Qassim Province
- Najd
- Charles Montagu Doughty
- Gertrude Bell
