= Maroc Soir (newspaper) =

- Type: Evening newspaper
- Format: Tabloid
- Owner: Othman Al Omeir
- Founder: Maroc Soir
- Editor-in-chief: Mahdi Harizi
- Founded: 10 November 2005; 20 years ago
- Political alignment: Pro-government
- Language: French
- Headquarters: Casablanca

Maroc Soir is an evening Moroccan newspaper that is published in French-language.

== History and profile ==
Maroc Soir was launched on 10 November 2005 by the publishing group of the same name, Maroc Soir Group, headed by Othman Al Omeir. The paper is the successor of the newspaper with the same name which was started in 1902. The headquarters of the paper is in Casablanca. The paper is published five times per week. The editor is Mahdi Harizi, a famous Moroccan writer and journalist.

The paper is published in tabloid format and consists of 24 full color pages. The newspaper has a pro-government stance.
