= Assabah =

Daily Arabophone Moroccan newspaper

Assabah الصبــاح
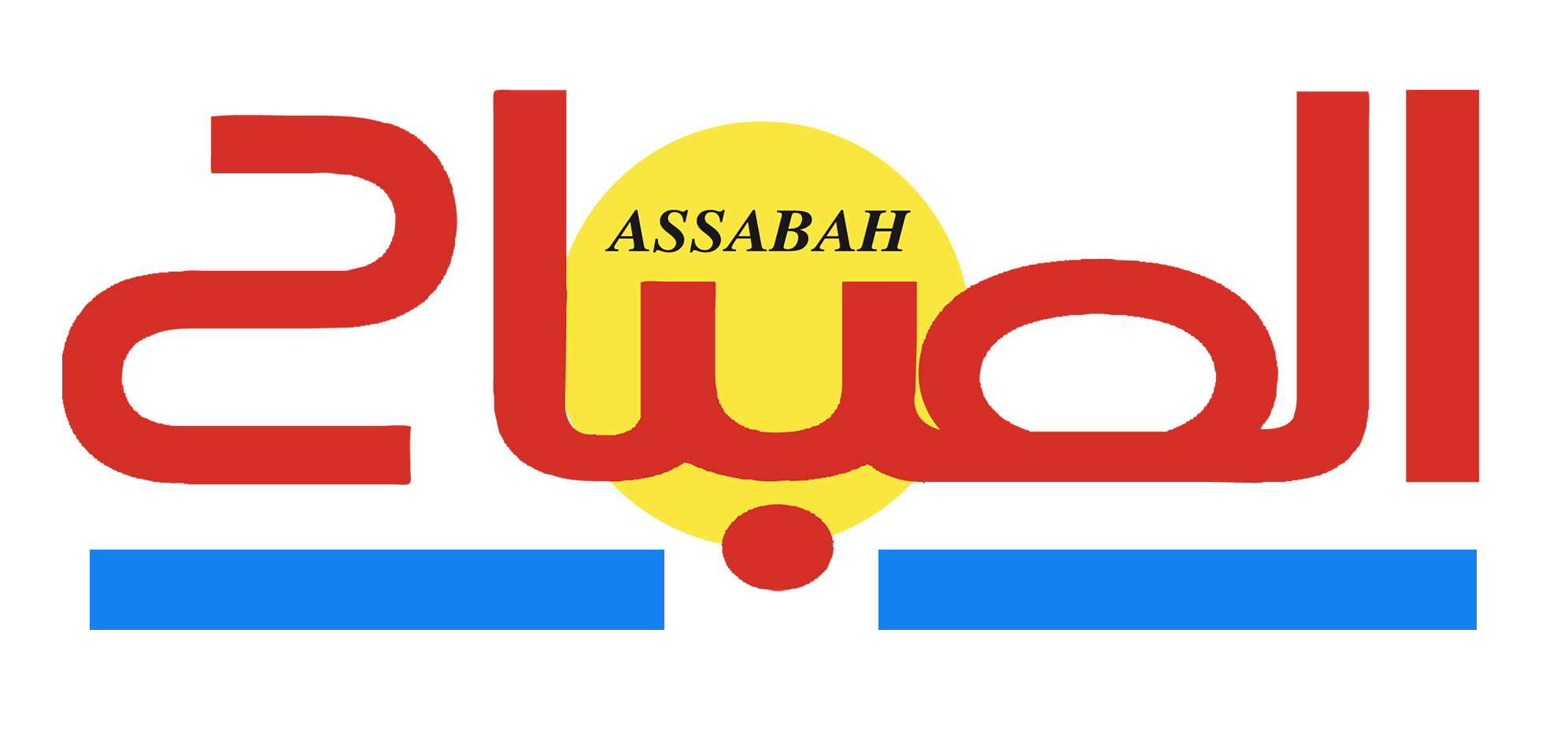
- Type: Daily newspaper
- Owner: Ecomedias
- Founder: Abdelmounaim DILAMI
- Founded: 2000; 26 years ago
- Language: Arabic
- Headquarters: Casablanca
- Sister newspapers: L'Économiste
- Website: Official website

Assabah (Arabic: الصباح) is a daily Arabophone Moroccan newspaper.

It is headquartered in Casablanca.

Assabah is part of Groupe Éco-Médias, which also controls Atlantic Radio and L'Economiste.

The owner of Groupe Eco-Medias is businessman Zouheir Bennani.

He is the founder of supermarket company Label Vie-Carrefour Maroc and real estate company Aradei Capital.

== History and profile ==
Assabah was established in 2000. It is a sister publication of L'Economiste and both are owned by Eco-Médias. Its 2012 circulation was 86,907 copies.

== See also ==
- List of Moroccan newspapers
