= L'Économiste =

Moroccan business newspaper

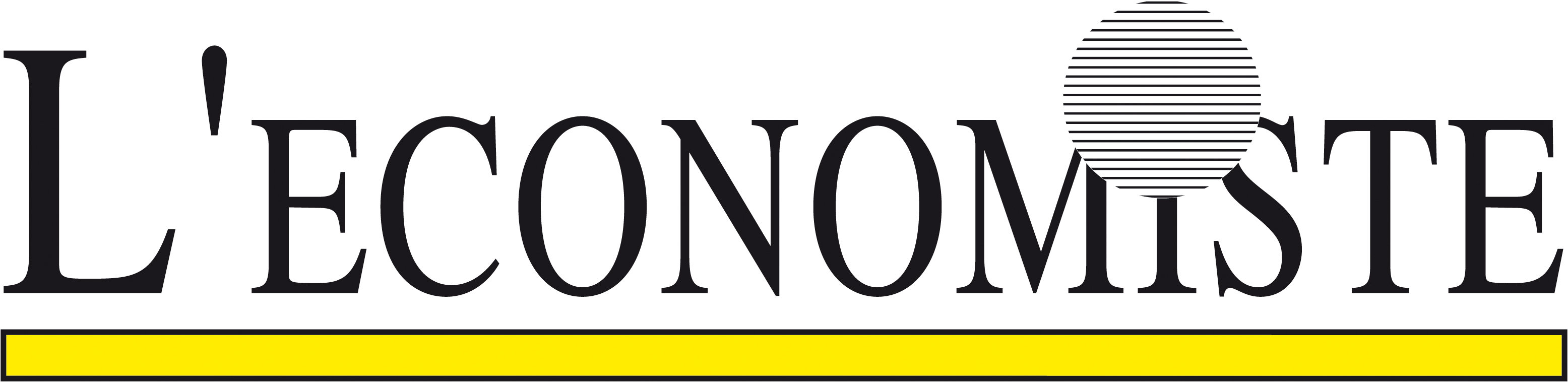
- Type: Daily newspaper (in weekdays)
- Format: Tabloid
- Owner: Eco-Médias
- Founder(s): Nassredine El Afrit; Marie-Thérèse Bourrut; Abdelmounaïm Dilami
- Editor-in-chief: Mohamed Benabid
- Founded: 1998; 28 years ago
- Political alignment: Independent
- Language: French
- Headquarters: Casablanca
- Circulation: 24,053 (2012)
- Sister newspapers: Assabah
- OCLC number: 688340037
- Website: www.leconomiste.com

L'Économiste is a French-language business newspaper published in Morocco. The newspaper specializes in economic and financial news.

It is headquartered in Casablanca.

L'Economiste is part of Groupe Éco-Médias, which also controls Atlantic Radio and Assabah.

The owner of Groupe Eco-Medias is businessman Zouheir Bennani. He is known as the founder of supermarket company Label Vie and real estate company Aradei Capital.

== History and profile ==
L'Économiste was first published in 1998. The paper is based in Casablanca. It is the sister publication of Arabic daily Assabah and both are owned by Eco-Médias. Although it is an independent paper, it has a pro-government stance.

L'Économiste is published on weekdays and focuses on business news. Its website was launched in 1993, making L'Économiste the second newspaper to have an online edition. The paper is the recipient of the Victoires de la Presse award in the category of the scoop/article of the year.

The 2003 circulation of L'Économiste was 22,000 copies. It was 24,053 copies in 2012.
