= Eco-Médias =

Moroccan media company

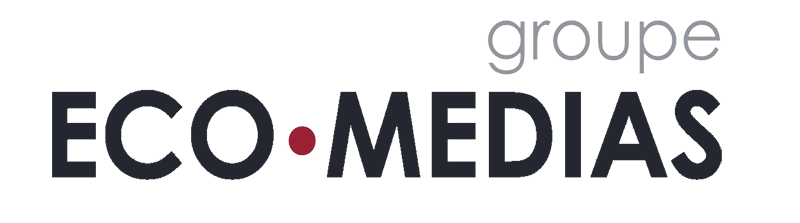
- Native name: ايكوميديا
- Type: Société Anonyme
- Industry: Media
- Founded: 1991; 35 years ago
- Founder: Nassredine El Afrit; Marie-Thérèse Bourrut; Abdelmounaïm Dilami
- Headquarters: Casablanca, Morocco
- Key people: Marie-Thérèse Bourrut; Abdelmounaïm Dilami
- Total assets: capital MAD 50 million
- Owner: Zouheir Bennani (70%)
- Subsidiaries: Assabah; L'Économiste; Atlantic Radio
- Website: ecomedias.ma

Eco-Médias (Arabic: ايكوميديا) is a Moroccan media company.

It controls two newspapers (Assabah, l'Economiste), one radio station (Atlantic Radio) and one journalism school (ESJC).

The main owner of Groupe Eco-Medias is businessman Zouheir Bennani.

He is the founder of supermarket company Label Vie, also known as Carrefour Maroc. He is also the founder of real estate company Aradei Capital.

== Subsidiaries ==
- Assabah (Arabic-language daily, printed 86,907 copies/day in 2012)
- L'Économiste (French-language economic news daily, printed 24,053 copies/day in 2012)
- L'Economiste (French-language monthly business magazine)
- Atlantic radio, (French-language music and business news radio)
- Ecole Supérieur de Journalisme et de Communication, the leading journalism school in Morocco
- Eco-print, company that prints their publications

== Key people ==
- Abdelmounaim Dilami, President and Director General
- Khalid Belyazid, Director General
- Marie-Thérèse Bourrut (French citizen and wife of Abdelmounaim Dilami. She writes under the pen-name Nadia Salah), Director of publication

== Ownership ==
As of 2009:

- Marie-Thérèse BOURRUT 31.3%
- Abdelmounaïm DILAMI 29.2%
- Khalid BELYAZID 3.5%
- AIXOR (holding company owned by Jean Luc Martinet, the national delegate for the right-wing French party UMP) 10.3%
- SUNERGIA (Nader MAWLAWI, Lebanese businessman) 10.3%
- GLOBAL COMMUNICATION (subsidiary of SNI 10.3%
- SOPAR (Kettani family) 7.5%

After the death of Hassan II the couple Bourrut-Dilami increased their share in the company, controlling today the majority stake. Additionally the company saw the entrance of French national Martinet in the capital despite a ban on foreign ownership in the media in the Moroccan law. In 1996 the ownership was:

- Marie-Thérèse BOURRUT (a.k.a. Nadia Salah) 15%
- Abdelmounaïm DILAMI 9.5%
- Khalid BELYAZID 3.5%
- Nassredine EL AFRIT (Tunisian national) 7.5%
- Moulay Abdelhafid EL ALAMY (president of the Holding Saham and Minister of Industry since 2013) 9.5%
- Abderrahmane SAAÏDI (Minister of privatisation at the time) 9.1%
- Global Communication 9.5%
- Sopar 7.5%.
- Afriquia (subsidiary of Aziz Akhannouch's Akwa) 5%
- Kat (OUAZZANI family and Kamil Ouazzani, importer of Alcoholic beverages and liqueur) 9.5%
- Sunergia 9.5%
- Attijari Capital Risque (subsidiary of Banque Commerciale du Maroc which merged with Wafa to form Attijariwafa bank in 2003) 7.5%

=== Recently ===
In 2020, businessman Zouheir Bennani and his associate Nader Mawlawi purchased 70% of Groupe Eco-Media. Bennani is one of the most famous businessman in Morocco. He is known as the founder of supermarket company Label Vie-Carrefour Maroc.
