= Morocco Times =

Defunct Moroccan digital newspaper

- Format: Digital newspaper
- Owner(s): Maroc Soir Group
- Publisher: Maroc Soir Group
- Founded: November 22, 2004; 20 years ago
- Language: English
- Ceased publication: October 2006; 19 years ago
- Country: Morocco
- Website: themoroccotimes.com

Morocco Times was an English language digital newspaper, founded on 22 November 2004, based in Morocco and owned by the oldest media company in the country, Maroc Soir Group, a publishing house that owns several of Morocco's major newspapers.

== History ==
On 22 November 2004, Morocco Times began publishing its newspaper digitally. It was owned by the Maroc Soir Group, a publishing house that owns several of Morocco's major newspapers and is the oldest media company in Morocco.

Morocco Times stopped being published at the end of October 2006, a few weeks before its second birthday.

Morocco Times is not to be confused with The Moroccan Times, a news magazine launched in 2014.
