= Pierre Mas =

- Born: 1891
- Died: 8 December 1970 (aged 78–79); Tangier

Pierre Mas (1891–1970 Tangier) was a French media mogul of the francophone press in Morocco under the French Protectorate.

== Biography ==
With the fortune he inherited from his father, who in 1907 opened a branch of Banque lyonnaise in Morocco, Pierre Mas began his media empire in 1919 with the purchase of the major daily newspaper L'Echo Du Maroc. On 1 January 1920 he founded le Petit Marocain in Casablanca. The following year, through a sale of shares, he came to control La Vigie Marocaine in Casablanca as well. In 1929, he founded le Courrier du Maroc in Fes. He then added to these la Dépêche marocaine in Tangier. This media conglomerate came to be called Presse Mas. He also founded l'Agence marocaine de publicité.

He was put under house arrest in 1945 for his support of the Vichy regime.

The year after the death of Pierre Mas, on 1 November 1971, the Moroccan authorities decided to suspend the publication of La Vigie Marocaine and le Petit Marocain.
