= Le Petit Marocain =

Daily Francophone publication in protectorate-era Morocco

- Type: Daily newspaper
- Owner: Mas Presse
- Founded: 1925
- Ceased publication: 1972
- Language: French
- Headquarters: Casablanca
- OCLC number: 35359124

Le Petit Marocain was a daily publication founded during the protectorate era in Morocco and the predecessor publication of Le Matin.

== History and profile ==
Le Petit Marocain was founded in 1925 and was based in Casablanca. The paper belonged to the company Mas Presse, which was controlled by French nationals Pierre Mas and Yves Mas. Its editorial line was ultra-colonialist, and it actively sought the promotion of the colonial policies of France in the country and it notably supported the Vichy government and the deposition and exile of Mohammed V.

The newspaper ceased publication on 1 November 1972 when the control of Mas Presse was given to Moulay Hafid Alaoui, cousin of Hassan II and minister of information during that time. It was replaced on the same day by Le Matin, a daily dedicated to the promotion of the image of the King of Morocco; its purchase was compulsory for all state administrations.
