= Le Matin (Morocco) =

Daily francophone Moroccan newspaper

- Type: Daily
- Owner: Othman Al Omeir
- Founder: Maroc Soir
- Founded: 1971; 55 years ago
- Political alignment: Pro-government
- Language: French
- Headquarters: Casablanca
- Sister newspapers: Assahra Al Maghribiya
- Website: lematin.ma

Le Matin (French pronunciation: [lə matɛ̃], The Morning; prev. known as Le Matin du Sahara et du Maghreb) is a daily French-language Moroccan newspaper. It was founded on 1 November 1971, as replacement of pro-colonial daily Le Petit Marocain, whose publisher Mas Presse was seized and given to the cousin of Hassan II and his minister of communication Moulay Hafid Alaoui.

== History and profile ==
Le Matin was first published in 1971. The paper belongs to Maroc Soir Group and is based in Casablanca.

The newspaper is known for its pro-government stances. Its sister newspaper is Assahra Al Maghribiya. In 2006, Le Matin launched its Gulf edition which is also printed in French.

The 2001 circulation was 100,000 copies, making it the second largest daily along with Al Alam newspaper in the country. However, its 2003 circulation dropped to 50,000 copies.

== See also ==
- List of newspapers in Morocco
