= Elaph =

Arabic language online newspaper

- 150x89 pixel Elaph logo
- Type: Daily
- Format: Online newspaper
- Founder: Othman Al Omeir
- Publisher: Elaph Publishing
- Managing editor: Samar Malak
- Founded: 21 May 2001; 25 years ago
- Political alignment: Liberal
- Language: Arabic
- Headquarters: London
- Website: Elaph

Elaph (Arabic: إيلاف; Solidarity) is the first daily Arabic independent online newspaper and is not associated with any established print or broadcast medium.

== History and profile ==
Elaph was launched by Elaph Publishing in London in 2001. The reason for choosing London as its headquarters was to be free from the censorship rules of Saudi Arabia and also, offer liberal viewpoints, particularly in opposition to religious radicalism. The goal of Elaph is stated as to offer a mix of print, audio and visual material to its readers. The paper claims that it does not target Saudi Arabian readers, but all Arabs.

The owner of the news portal is Saudi businessman, journalist and author Othman Al Omeir, who is the former editor of the London-based weekly The Majalla and Arabic-language daily Al Sharq Al Awsat. After the ban of Elaph in Saudi Arabia in May 2006, it was registered in the United Kingdom.

== Staff and management ==
The founder and editor-in-chief of Elaph is Othman Al Omeir. Emile Isaac is the managing director and Samar Abdul Malak is the deputy editor-in-chief of Elaph. The news portal has journalists in Saudi Arabia, UAE, Qatar, Kuwait, Bahrain, Jordan, Iraq, Egypt, Syria, Lebanon, Palestine, Yemen, Tunisia, Algeria and Morocco. As of 2007, the portal employed 90 journalists worldwide.

Elaph is managed by Integrated Intelligent Solutions (IN2SOL), a Middle East provider of IT services. In June 2014 Elaph reported that it would use unmanned aerial drones to cover and delivers news.

== Content ==
The Elaph news portal offers the readers instant news from all around the world, making it a strong competitor to Arab and international news agencies. Additionally, it involves pages on politics, business, culture, health, sports, music, cinema, fashion, features, reports, newspapers, technology, writers, opinions, and special news. Elaph.com also provides video news and tries to provide an interactive platform for its readers. For instance, in January 2009, its readers were asked to send farewell letters to then US President George W. Bush.

In September 2011, Elaph reported that the Saudi Ambassador to Cairo, Ahmad Abdelaziz Kattan, survived an attempted assassination by poison, allegedly organized by Iran. It further claimed that since the Saudi diplomats, including Adel Al Jubeir, were all close to Prince Bandar who was known to be a strong opponent of Iranian influence in the Middle East, they were likely to experience such events. The e-newspaper also reported a comment of a Salafist Sheikh in Egypt, Sheik Abu Ishaq al Heweny in December 2011 who said that "a woman's face is like a vagina so that it should be covered with a veil".

== Traffic and influence ==
In 2003, it was reported that Elaph gained a wide audience among liberal and democratic writers. It was much more popular than on-line versions of the leading printed newspapers such as Al Hayat in 2004. The newsportal became the most popular internet site, ahead even the website of Al Jazeera, in Saudi Arabia in 2005. Then, it enjoyed popularity in other countries as seen in the following figures of 2009: Egypt (11.4%), Saudi Arabia (8.3%), the United States (8.0%), Iraq (6.8%), the United Arab Emirates (6.4%), Libya (5.0%), Kuwait (4.9%), Algeria (4.8%), Lebanon (4.6%) and Qatar (4.0%). The other countries where Elaph is read include Germany, Sweden, Canada, Denmark, the Netherlands, Austria, France, Finland and Switzerland. On 5 November 2008, the day following the US presidential elections, Elaph reached an all-time record high of 18 million hits. As a result of its popularity and international readership, Elaph.com became one of the leading news portals in the Arab world.

The website was officially audited by the Audit Bureau of Circulations (ABC). Its traffic was certified in May 2010 which produced ABC's certificate of 1,179,801 users and 8,565,601 page impressions. Furthermore, based on data from August 2010, the website had 1.3 million global users per month. Elaph was the tenth most visited website in the Arab world in 2012.

== Bans ==
Elaph was blocked in Saudi Arabia in May 2006. The block for which no official reason had been stated was lifted in 2009. However, after publishing the leaked cables in an article with the title of "Gulf after WikiLeaks storm, Riyadh Speaks while all are silent", the site was again blocked in Saudi Arabia on 6 December 2010. It is clear that the site, along with the other news portal Al Quds Al Arabi, has been continuously blocked and unblocked in Saudi Arabia.

It was also blocked in Yemen in 2004 for a period of time based on the claim that it posted "sexual material". However, it was argued by Yemen Observer that the real reason for the block was reports of Elaph containing personal criticism of then Yemeni President Ali Abdallah Saleh and his elder son Ahmed. Libya and Syria also blocked Elaph before 2006.

== Expansion ==
It was announced in May 2011 that the website would be expanded by launching more comprehensive multi-media services, called Elaph Multi-Media [EMM], in 2012. The CEO of EMM is reported to be current managing director of Elaph, Nicholas Claxton. Elaph also partnered with Ultra Knowledge as its technology partner and innovator of the Newswall in May 2012.

== Awards ==
Elaph was awarded the Artistic Creativity Award in 2007, a prize offered by Arab Thought Foundation.
