= Sīra shaʿbiyya =

Sīra shaʿbiyya is a genre in Islamic literature consisting of long heroic narrative. The sīras are generally historical fictions, using historical settings, characters and events and focussing on military exploits. They are typical written in sajʿ (rhymed prose) interspersed with poetry. They are very long. In written form, they are 2000–6000 pages in printed editions. In oral performance, sessions may stretch out over a year.

The Arabic term sīra shaʿbiyya was coined by Arab folklorists in the 1950s to denote what is otherwise called "popular epic" or "popular romance". In the manuscripts, most examples of the genre bear titles containing either the word sīra (biography) or qiṣṣa (novel). The earliest evidence of specific compositions of the type comes from the twelfth century, although the tradition probably stretches back to the first centuries of Islam. The earliest surviving manuscripts of recorded sīras date to the fifteenth century. The first printed editions come from the nineteenth century. Although essentially an Arabic genre, several sīras were translated into other languages of the Islamic world, such as Persian, Ottoman Turkish, Georgian, Urdu and Malay.

Sīras are episodic and repetitive. Few have identifiable authors, since they originate in oral traditions. They "form a cohesive genre by reason of their shared emphasis on heroes and heroic deeds of battle, their pseudo-historical tone and setting, and their indefatigable drive towards cyclic expansion; one event leads to another, one battle to another, one war to another, and so on for hundreds and thousands of pages." The genre is distinct from other popular tales, such as the One Thousand and One Nights.

The era of the Crusades is vividly captured in sīra literature. ‘Antara ibn Shaddad, Dhāt al-Himma, and Baybars spend a significant amount of time battling the Franks. A key narrative element in this context is the pattern of defending Islamic sacred spaces against Crusaders.

== Examples ==
Pre-Islamic history

- Sīrat Fīrūz-Shāh, based on Darius II
- Sīrat al-Iskandar, based on Alexander the Great
- Sīrat al-Malik Sayf ibn Dhi ʾl-Yazan, based on Sayf ibn Dhi ʾl-Yazan
- Sīrat ʿAntar, based on ʿAntara ibn Shaddād
- Qiṣṣat al-Zīr Sālim, based on the War of Basūs

Islamic history

- Sīrat Amīr Ḥamza, based on Ḥamza ibn ʿAbd al-Muṭṭalib
- Dhāt al-Himma
- Ghazwar al-Arqaṭ
- al-Badr-Nār
- Sīrat al-Ḥākim bi-Amr Allāh, based on al-Ḥākim bi-Amr Allāh
- Sīrat al-Mālik al-Ẓāhir Baybars, based on Baybars
- Qiṣṣat al-muqaddam ʿAlī al-Zaybaq, based on the character Aḥmad al-Danaf
- Qiṣṣat ʿAlī al-Zaybaq, based on the character ʿAlī al-Zaybaq
- Sīrat Banī Hilāl, based on the Banū Hilāl

== See also ==
- Arabic epic literature

== Bibliography ==
- Heath, Peter (1997). "Sīra shaʿbiyya". In Bosworth, C. E.; van Donzel, E.; Heinrichs, W. P. & Lecomte, G. (eds.). The Encyclopaedia of Islam, Second Edition. Volume IX: San–Sze. Leiden: E. J. Brill. doi:10.1163/1573-3912_islam_SIM_7058. ISBN 978-90-04-10422-8.
- Kruk, Remke (2004). "The Arabian Nights and the Popular Epics". In Ulrich Marzolph (ed.). The Arabian Nights: An Encyclopedia. ABC-CLIO. pp. 34–38.
- Lyons, Malcolm C. (1995). The Arabian Epic: Heroic and Oral Storytelling. Cambridge University Press. Vols. 1, 2 and 3.
- Sokolov, Oleg (2023). Vanquishers of the Crusaders: Mujāhidūn Characters in Arabic Folk Epics. Religions. ; 14(8):1042. https://doi.org/10.3390/rel14081042
