= Arabic epic literature =

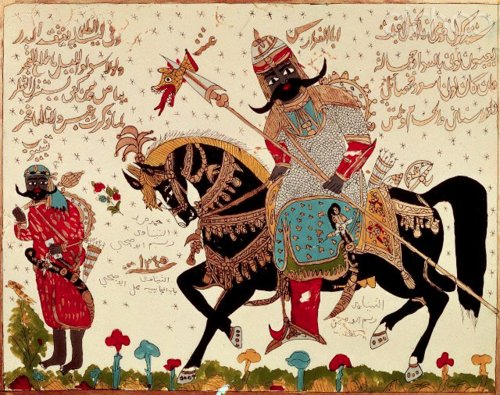
Pre-Islamic poet-knight Antarah ibn Shaddad is the hero of a popular medieval Arabic romance.

Arabic epic literature encompasses epic poetry and epic fantasy in Arabic literature. Virtually all societies have developed folk tales encompassing tales of heroes. Although many of these are legends, many are based on real events and historical figures.

== Popular epic ==
Taghribat Bani Hilal is an Arabic epic recounting the Banu Hilal's journey from Egypt to Tunisia and conquest of the latter in the 11th century. It was declared one of mankind's Masterpieces of the Oral and Intangible Heritage of Humanity by the UNESCO in 2003.

In the 13th century, an Arabic epic poem entitled Antar was created based on Antarah ibn Shaddad, a pre-Islamic Arabian-Abyssinian warrior-poet. Most of the Arabic folk epics, such as Sirat Antara, Sirat Dhat al-Himma, and Sirat Baybars, were composed in the Levant and Egypt in the 12th to 15th centuries, and they widely imprinted the imagery of the Crusades: the main characters in all of these epics, in addition to various adventures, fight against the Franks, i.e., the Crusaders. In 1898 the French painter Étienne Dinet published his translation of Antar, which brought Antar bin Shaddad to European notice. It has been followed by a number of derivative works such as Diana Richmond's Antar and Abla, which furthered Western exposure to the Antar bin Shaddad legends.

== Fantasy epic literature ==
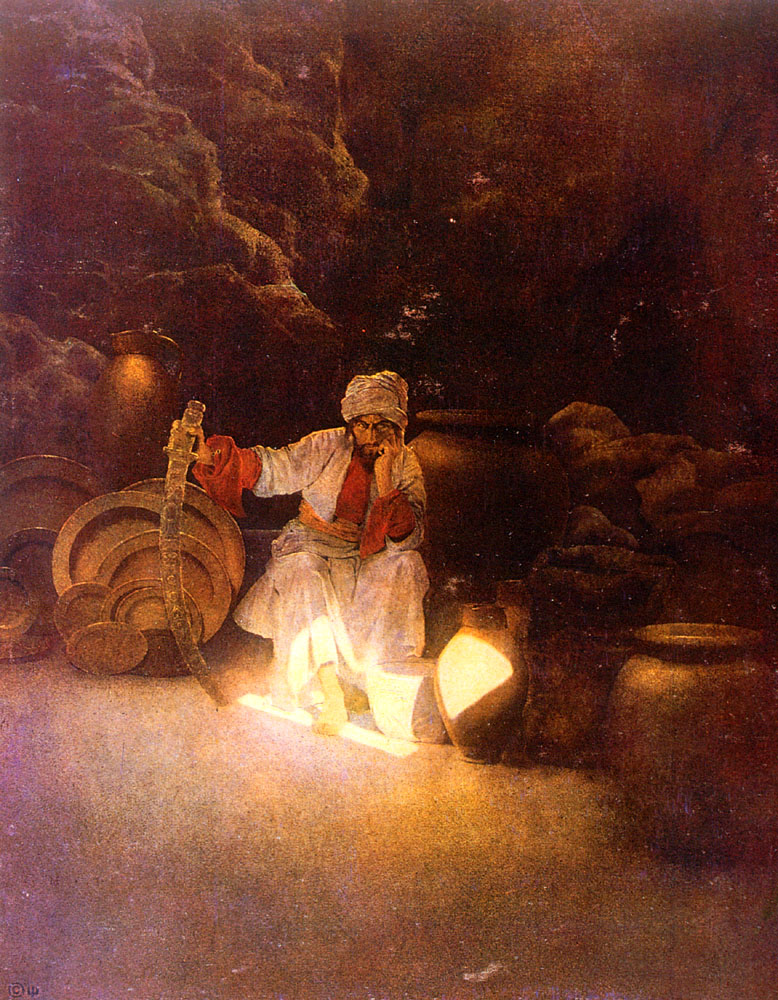
Painting of Cassim, brother of Ali Baba, by Maxfield Parrish.

The One Thousand and One Nights (Arabian Nights) is one of the best-known works associated with Arabic literature. It has had a significant influence on perceptions of Arabic and Middle Eastern culture particularly outside the Arabic-speaking world.

The stories of Aladdin and Ali Baba, usually regarded as part of the Tales from One Thousand and One Nights, were not actually part of the Tales. They were first included in French translation of the Tales by Antoine Galland who heard them being told by a traditional Arab storyteller and only existed in incomplete Arabic manuscripts before that. The other great character from Arabic literature, Sinbad, is from the Tales.

The Thousand and One Nights is usually placed in the genre of Arabic epic literature along with several other works. They are usually, like the Tales, collections of short stories or episodes strung together into a long tale. The extant versions were mostly written down relatively late on, after the 14th century, although many were undoubtedly collected earlier and many of the original stories are probably pre-Islamic. Types of stories in these collections include animal fables, proverbs, stories of jihad or propagation of the faith, humorous tales, moral tales, tales about the wily con-man Ali Zaybaq and tales about the prankster Juha.

The epic took form in the 10th century and reached its final form by the 14th century; the number and type of tales have varied from one manuscript to another. All Arabian fantasy tales were often called "Arabian Nights" when translated into English, regardless of whether they appeared in The Book of One Thousand and One Nights, in any version, and a number of tales are known in Europe as "Arabian Nights" despite existing in no Arabic manuscript.

This epic has been influential in the West since it was translated in the 18th century, first by Antoine Galland. Many imitations were written, especially in France. Various characters from this epic have themselves become cultural icons in Western culture, such as Aladdin, Sinbad and Ali Baba. Part of its popularity may have sprung from the increasing historical and geographical knowledge, so that places of which little was known and so marvels were plausible had to be set further "long ago" or farther "far away"; this is a process that continues, and finally culminate in the fantasy world having little connection, if any, to actual times and places. A number of elements from Arabian mythology and Persian mythology are now common in modern fantasy, such as genies, bahamuts, magic carpets, magic lamps, etc. When L. Frank Baum proposed writing a modern fairy tale that banished stereotypical elements, he included the genie as well as the dwarf and the fairy as stereotypes to go.

Arabian Nights was not the only Fantasy story that exist in Arabic epic literature. Arabic short stories scripts was discovered in 1933 when Hellmut Ritter, a German orientalist, stumbled across it in the mosque of Ayasofya and translated it into his mother tongue. An Arabic edition was belatedly printed in 1956. It contains stories from the Arab world the stories originating in the 10th century, the title page of this medieval Arab story collection has been lost, but the opening sentence of its introduction declares that these are "al-hikayat al-‘ajiba wa’l-akhbar al-ghariba", which translate in English to "Tales of the Marvellous and News of the Strange". The Ottoman sultan Selim I, having defeated the Mamluks in two major battles in Syria and Egypt. The sultan celebrated his victory by taking Arabic manuscripts and then shipped to Istanbul and distributed among the city's mosques. The manuscript of Tales of the Marvellous eventually ended up in the library of the Ayasofya mosque. The stories are more than 1,000 years old, Six of these stories were later included in the Arabian Nights, but most of the stories are quite new and are not found in the Arabian nights stories. Tales of the Marvellous includes tales of the supernatural, romances, comedy, Bedouin derring-do and one story dealing in apocalyptic prophecy. The contents page indicates that the complete manuscript contained 42 chapters, of which only 18 chapters containing 26 tales have survived.

Dante Alighieri's Divine Comedy, considered the greatest epic of Italian literature, derived many features of and episodes about the hereafter directly or indirectly from Arabic works on Islamic eschatology: the Hadith and the Kitab al-Miraj (translated into Latin in 1264 or shortly before as Liber scalae Machometi, "The Book of Muhammad's Ladder") concerning Muhammad's ascension to Heaven, and the spiritual writings of Ibn Arabi.

== Science fiction ==
Al-Risalah al-Kamiliyyah fil Siera al-Nabawiyyah (The Treatise of Kamil on the Prophet's Biography), known in English as Theologus Autodidactus, written by the Arabian polymath Ibn al-Nafis (1213–1288), is one of the earliest known science fiction novels. While also being an early desert island story and coming of age story, the novel deals with various science fiction elements such as spontaneous generation, futurology, apocalyptic themes, the end of the world and doomsday, resurrection and the afterlife. Rather than giving supernatural or mythological explanations for these events, Ibn al-Nafis attempted to explain these plot elements using his own extensive scientific knowledge in anatomy, biology, physiology, astronomy, cosmology and geology. His main purpose behind this science fiction work was to explain Islamic religious teachings in terms of science and philosophy. For example, it was through this novel that Ibn al-Nafis introduces his scientific theory of metabolism, and he makes references to his own scientific discovery of the pulmonary circulation in order to explain bodily resurrection. The novel was later translated into English as Theologus Autodidactus in the early 20th century.

A number of stories within the One Thousand and One Nights (Arabian Nights) also feature science fiction elements. One example is "The Adventures of Bulukiya", where the protagonist Bulukiya's quest for the herb of immortality leads him to explore the seas, journey to the Garden of Eden and to Jahannam, and travel across the cosmos to different worlds much larger than his own world, anticipating elements of galactic science fiction; along the way, he encounters societies of jinns, mermaids, talking serpents, talking trees, and other forms of life. In another Arabian Nights tale, the protagonist Abdullah the Fisherman gains the ability to breathe underwater and discovers an underwater submarine society that is portrayed as an inverted reflection of society on land, in that the underwater society follows a form of primitive communism where concepts like money and clothing do not exist. Other Arabian Nights tales deal with lost ancient technologies, advanced ancient civilizations that went astray, and catastrophes which overwhelmed them. "The City of Brass" features a group of travellers on an archaeological expedition across the Sahara to find an ancient lost city and attempt to recover a brass vessel that Solomon once used to trap a jinn, and, along the way, encounter a mummified queen, petrified inhabitants, lifelike humanoid robots and automata, seductive marionettes dancing without strings, and a brass horseman robot who directs the party towards the ancient city. "The Ebony Horse" features a robot in the form of a flying mechanical horse controlled using keys that could fly into outer space and towards the Sun, while the "Third Qalandar's Tale" also features a robot in the form of an uncanny boatman. "The City of Brass" and "The Ebony Horse" can be considered early examples of proto-science fiction.

Other examples of early Arabic proto-science fiction include Al-Farabi's Opinions of the residents of a splendid city about a utopian society, and elements such as the flying carpet.

== List ==
Here is a list of famous epic or romance literature in the Arabic language:

- One Thousand and One Nights (Arabian Nights)
- Sirat Antara Ibn Shaddad (سيرة عنترة بن شداد)
- Sirat al-Zahir Baibars (سيرة الظاهر بيبرس)
- Sirat Bani Hilal (تغريبة بني هلال)
- Sirat Sayf Ibn Dhi Yazan (سيرة سيف بن ذي يزن)
- Sirat Dhat al-Himma, Arabic queen tale (سيرة ذات الهمة)
- Sirat prince Hamza al-Bahlawn or Hamza al-Arab (سيرة الأمير حمزة البهلوان أو حمزة العرب)
- Sirat Ali al-Zaibak (سيرة علي الزيبق)
- Sirat Sayf al-Tijan (سيرة سيف التيجان)
- al-Sirah al-Hussainyya (السيرة الحسينية)
- Mal'abat Al-Kafif az-Zarhuni (ملعبة الكفيف الزرهوني)
- The Tale of Al-Shater Hassan (قصة الشاطر حسن)
- The Tale of Zir Salim (قصة الزير سالم)
- The Tale of King Luqman bin Aad (قصة الملك لقمان بن عاد), According to the Tale He is the brother of Shaddad bin Aad
- Layla and Majnun in Arabic Majnun layla (مجنون ليلى) romantic epic (also known as Qays wa Laila, "Qays & Laila").
- Qissat Bayad wa Riyad (قصة بياض و رياض), Arab-Andalusian love story about Bayad, a merchant's son and a foreigner from Damascus, for Riyad, a well-educated slave girl in the court of an unnamed Hajib (vizier or minister) and his daughter.
- Tarikhul Hind wal Sind (تاريخ الهند والسند)
- Futuh al-Sham (Conquests of Syria) ascribed to al-Waqidi (disputed)

== See also ==
- Arabic literature
- Muhsin al-Ramli, co-founder of Alwah, a journal of Arabic literature
