= Abu Zayd =

Abu Zayd or Arabic: أبو زيد, alternatively transliterated as Abizaid,

== Abu Zayd ==
Abu Zayd may refer to:

=== People ===
- Abū Zayd ‘Abdu r-Raḥman bin Muḥammad bin Khaldūn Al-Hadrami (1332–1406), Arab polymath
- Abu Zayd al-Balkhi (b. 850), Persian Muslim polymath
- Abu Zayd Hassan, 9 c. merchant known for leaving an account on the Guangzhou massacre
- Abu Zayd al-Hilali, 11th-century Arab leader
  - As "Abu Zayd", he is the black epic hero and trickster figure of the epic Taghribat Bani Hilal
- ’Abū Zayd Ḥunayn ibn ’Isḥāq al-‘Ibādī (809–873), Nestorian scholar, physician, and scientist
- Abū Zayd ibn Muḥammad ibn Abī Zayd (fl. 1186 - 1219), Persian potter
- Zayd Abu Zayd (c. 1195 – 1265/1270), last Almohad governor of Valencia
- Hikmat Zaid (b. 1945), Palestinian politician, former minister and ambassador
- Abuzed Omar Dorda (b. 1944), Libyan prime minister and permanent representative to the United Nations
- Hikmat Abu Zayd (b. 1922), Egyptian Minister of Social Affairs and first female cabinet member
- Nasr Abu Zayd, (b. 1943, d. 2010), Egyptian Qur'anic scholar persecuted for his liberal interpretation of Islam
- Abu Zaid Al-Kuwaiti (d. 2005), Kuwaiti Salafist Jihad fighter and suspected al-Qaeda agent

=== Other uses ===
- Abu Zayd al-Hilali (film), 1947 Egyptian film about the 11th-century Arab leader

== Abizaid ==
=== People ===
Abizaid is a variant transliteration of Abu Zayd. Notable people with the include:

- Amanda Abizaid, Lebanese-American singer, model, and actress.
- John Abizaid (born 1951), Lebanese-American retired US Army general, former U.S. ambassador, and former military commander of the United States Central Command.
- Christine Abizaid, is a Lebanese-American U.S. intelligence officer who is currently the director of the United States National Counterterrorism Center.
