= Hadith Bayad wa Riyad =

13th-century Arabic love story

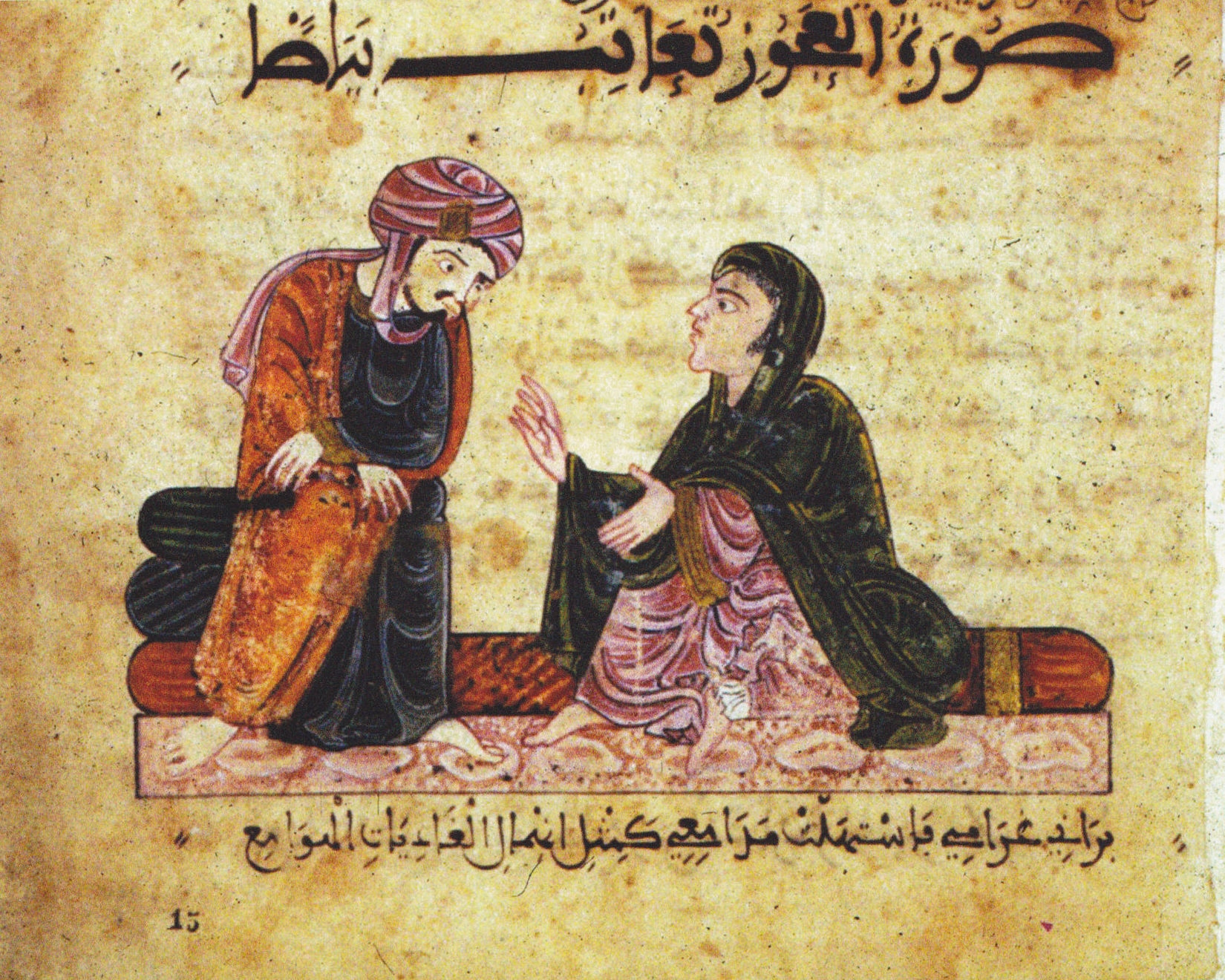
- A miniature in the Vatican manuscript (Vat. Ar. 368) of Hadith Bayad wa Riyad, (late 12th century)
- Original title: حديث بياض ورياض
- Language: Arabic
- Subject: Love story
- Genre: Arabic literature
- Published: 13th century
- Publication place: Al-Andalus
- Media type: Manuscript

Hadīth Bayāḍ wa Riyāḍ (Arabic: حديث بياض ورياض, "The Story of Bayad and Riyad") is a 13th-century Arabic love story. The main characters of the tale are Bayad, a merchant's son and a foreigner from Damascus; Riyad, a well-educated slave girl in the court of an unnamed Hajib (vizier or minister) of 'Iraq (Mesopotamia); and a "Lady" (al-sayyida).

== Background ==
Naoya Katsumata, Haitham M. Sharqawy, and Ahmed Zain Eddin, place the story withing the context of emerging tradition of Arabic storytelling. They describe it as a continuation of books of news, such as the Book of Wahb ibn Munabbih, of the Umayyad and Abbasid period and associate it with other narrative works of the period including Kalīla wa-Dimna, the Thousand and One Nights, the Story of Antarah, The Tale of Lady Dhāt al-Himma, and The Tale of al-Zahir Baybars.

== Manuscript ==
Hadīth Bayāḍ wa Riyāḍ exists in three extant manuscripts from al-Andalus, or Muslim Iberia (711–1492): one in the Vatican City, one in Dublin, and one in Paris. The manuscript in the Vatican Library, Codex Vat. Arabo 368, though incomplete, is a rare illustrated manuscript from al-Andalus.

The Dublin and Paris manuscripts, which are complete, are not illustrated and contain a different version of the story.

=== Vatican manuscript (Vat. Ar. 368) ===
==== Possession history ====
The manuscript of Hadith Bayad wa Riyad is currently in the Vatican Library, labeled as Vat. Ar. 368, and it is the only surviving manuscript that contains both text and images of this story. In addition, it is one of the very few surviving Arabic manuscripts from Al-Andalus. The early possession history of the manuscript is unknown, and there is no direct evidence of when or how it arrived in the Vatican Library. Some scholars have hypothesized that it may have come to Rome together with other Arabic manuscripts taken from Tunis in 1535 as spoils of war, but this remains only a hypothesis. The first clear record of the manuscript inside the Vatican appears in an inventory arranged by the brothers Marino and Federico Ranaldi in the late 17th century, under the title “Gesta vetulae,” which also notes that the manuscript is missing some of its beginning and end, which agrees with current status of the manuscript. The manuscript has been scanned and digitized and is hosted on the library's DigiVatLib website.

==== Visual analysis ====
The Hadith Bayad wa Riyad is important to Islamic art history because it is one of few manuscripts that have survived. What’s interesting about this piece is that the story takes place in Mesopotamia but visually takes place in Spain. The manuscript has a restrained palette, for example, pink, dark green, grey-blue, and light green which are typical of the Spanish textile traditions. The Baghdad-school to the east typically uses colors including red, bright blue, and light green. The color visually relocates the story to Al-Andalus. The architecture that is shown on some of the pages of the manuscript, like the colors, confirms this is an Al-Andalus piece. The minarets and peaked roofs are a style associated with some architecture seen in Seville, Spain. The miradors which are viewing points or windows are common features of the citadels of Málaga and Granada. In all, visually this is an Al-Andalus piece, and the colors and architecture presented confirm that. The artist places his cultural reality in Mesopotamia. The importance of the architecture visually is because the artist in his story textually places it in Mesopotamia, but the architecture gives us the artists current reality.

===== Gallery =====
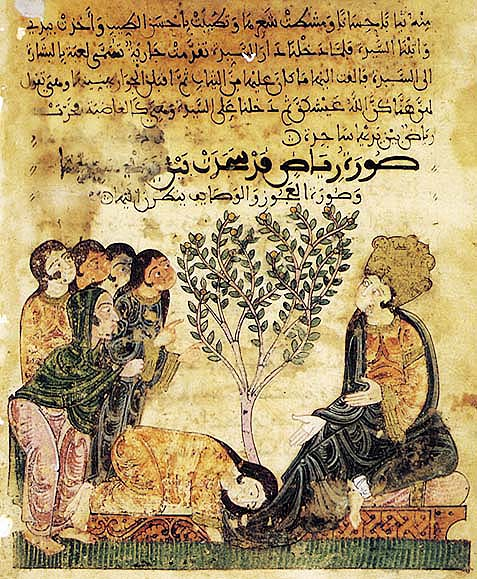

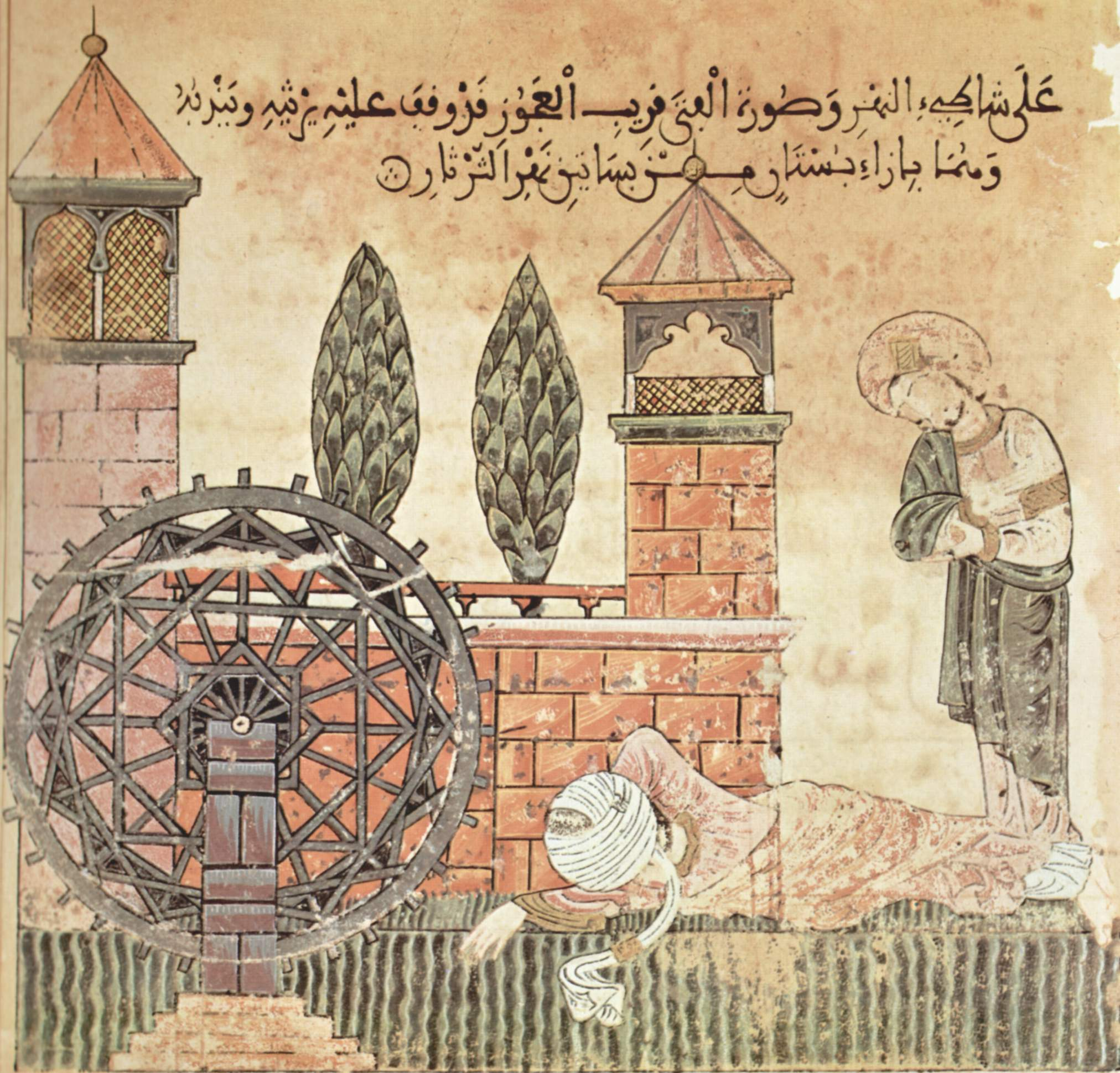

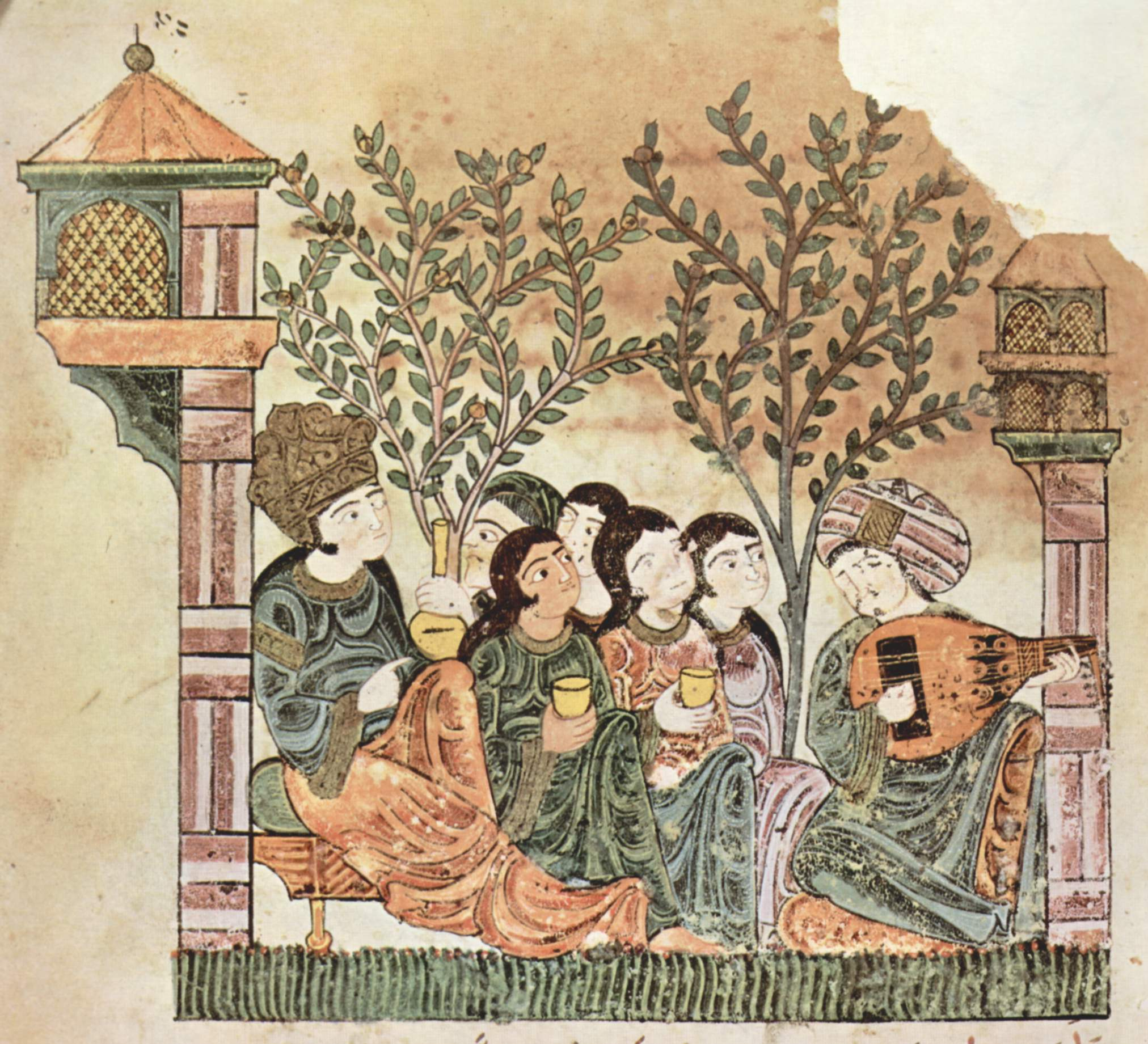

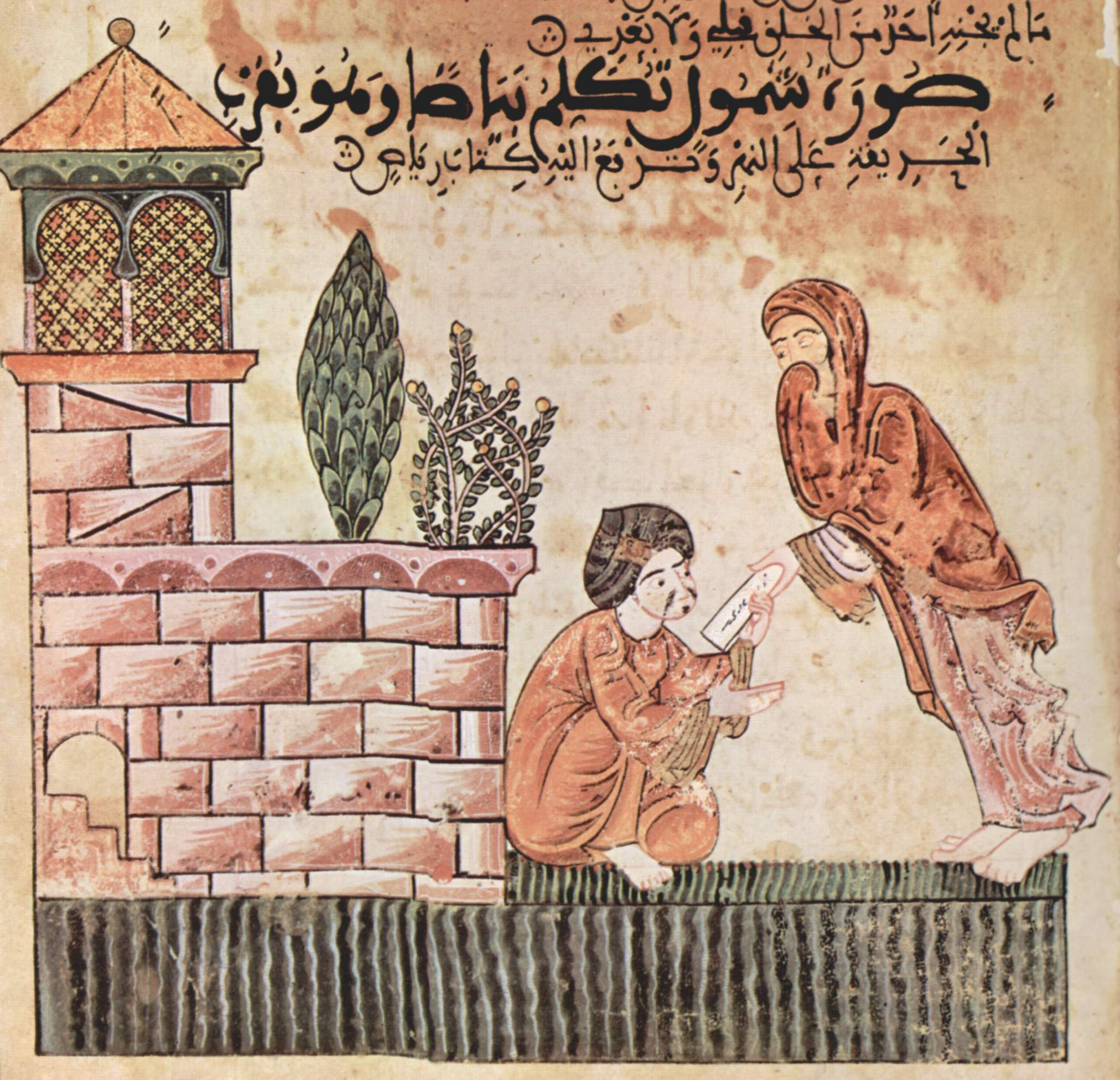

== Linguistic context ==
The Hadith Bayad wa Riyad manuscript is written in Arabic. Although the original manuscript is written in Arabic, context for the work involves a history of poetry and spoken word that merged Hebrew, Arabic, and the Romance Languages in Al-Andalus. The Muwashshah is one example of art that was developed that included ending verses that merged the three languages in word and poetic technique. This technique more often happened during the Taifa, Almoravid, and Almohad periods. During the 12th century, al-Andalus saw a falling out of the Romance Languages for replacement with Arabic. Evidence shows that Muwashshah written during this time, despite the reference to the Romance languages and Hebrew, they do not communicate that the authors had a strong understanding of the spoken languages they were writing. Instead, they seem to be attempts at replicating the writings of the past, showing a strong cultural and literary use of Arabic around the 13th century.

== Legacy ==
According to Matti Huss, the maqama The Tale of Toviyah ben Tsidkiyah (נאום טוביה בן צדקיה) by Joseph ben Shimeon of Ceuta (c. 1160–1226) is derived from Hadith Bayad wa Riyad.

== See also ==
- Arabic epic literature
- Arabic literature
