= Khalifa al-Zanati =

Khalifa al-Zanati (Arabic: خليفة الزناتي) was one of the main characters in the Bani Hilal epic, where he appears as the Berber king of Tunis. The epic says that during the siege of Bani Hilal to Tunis he asked their knights for duels every day and killed many of them, not even Abu Zayd al-Hilali was able to defeat him. His destiny was to be killed by Dhieb bin Ghanim who thrust a spear into his eyes. The epic also says that one of the reasons of his defeat was the betrayal of his daughter Sadaa who fell in love with Maree, a Hilalian prince held captive in her fathers prison.

The historical Khalifa Al-Zanati may have been a general serving the ruler of Tlemcen in present-day Algeria. Scholar Maribel Fierro suggests he may have been Abd al-Mu'min.
