= Allen James Fromherz =

American historian (born 1980)

Allen Fromherz (born May 10, 1980) is an American historian specializing in the Middle East and Mediterranean. From 2007 to 2008 he was a professor at Qatar University. He joined the faculty of Georgia State University in 2008. Since 2015, Fromherz has served as President of the American Institute for Maghrib Studies (AIMS), a part of the Council of American Overseas Research Centers (CAORC).

== Early life ==
Fromherz was born on May 10, 1980, in Dallas, Oregon. He wrote an undergraduate honors thesis on Ibn Khaldun under the direction of Gene Garthwaite at Dartmouth College, where he graduated summa cum laude in 2002. From 2002-2003 Fromherz was a Fulbright Scholar in Morocco. From 2003-2006 Fromherz studied for his PhD under the supervision of Hugh Kennedy at the University of St. Andrews in Scotland. His doctoral dissertation is titled The Rise of the Almohads: Islam, Identity and Belief in North Africa.

== Academic career ==
In 2007, Fromherz joined the faculty of Qatar University as an assistant professor of Middle East history.

In 2008, he joined the history department at Georgia State University in Atlanta, Georgia, as a professor of medieval Mediterranean and Middle East history, where he currently teaches and directs the Middle East Studies Center.

== Publications ==
In addition to works on medieval North Africa and a biography of Ibn Khaldun, he published the first full-length history of modern Qatar - Qatar, A Modern History. In 2020 he became founding book series editor, with Matt Buehler, of Edinburgh Studies on the Maghreb. The series is dedicated to publishing works on the history, politics, and society of North Africa in English. With Abdulrahman al-Salimi, he edited a book on Sultan Qaboos and Modern Oman 1970-2020 and hosted one of the first conferences dedicated to the history of Oman during the reign of Sultan Qaboos at Georgia State University in 2022.

== Honors ==
In 2015, Fromherz became president of the American Institute for Maghrib Studies (AIMS).

In 2016, he was named as a senior humanities fellow at New York University Abu Dhabi (NYUAD).

In 2018, he was elected for a second term as president of AIMS and is a board member of the Council of Overseas Research Centers (CAORC).

In 2022, he was named a senior Fulbright Scholar to Spain to study the life and times of the Granada polymath and historian Ibn al-Khatib.

== Bibliography ==
- 2010, The Almohads: The Rise of an Islamic Empire, (IB Tauris, London)
- 2010, Ibn Khaldun, Life and Times, (Edinburgh University Press)
- 2012, Qatar: A Modern History, (Georgetown University Press)
- 2016, The Near West, Medieval North Africa, Latin Europe and the Mediterranean in the Second Axial Age, (Edinburgh University Press)
- 2017, Qatar, a Modern History, Updated Edition, (Georgetown University Press)
- 2018, Editor, The Gulf in World History, Arabia at the Global Crossroads, (Edinburgh University Press)
- 2020, Editor, Special Section of Journal of North African Studies (JNAS), The Hafsids and the Axial Western Mediterranean
- 2021, Editor with Nadav Samin, Knowledge, Authority and Change in Islamic Societies, (Brill)
- 2022, Editor with Abdulrahman al-Salimi, Sultan Qaboos and Modern Oman 1970-2020, (Edinburgh University press)
- 2024, The Center of the World: A Global History of the Persian Gulf (University of California Press)

== See also ==
- Su'da
