= Su'da =

- Al-Sirah al-Hilaliyyah character

In-universe information
- Significant others: Diyab; Mar'i
- Nationality: Berber

Suʾda (Arabic: سودا), also known as Sa'ada (fl. eleventh century), was a legendary Berber princess who is an important character in the oral epic Al-Sirah al-Hilaliyyah.

== Biography ==
Suʾda appears as an important character in the Al-Sirah al-Hilaliyyah, an epic poem that describes the march of Arab tribes westward. Her father, known as al-Zanatı Khalıfa, held her in esteem, and unusually, had adopted part of her name as his own: Abu Suʾda al Yafrani al Zanatai. He was a Berber general from the Zenata tribe, who fought for the ruler of the Zenata Kingdom Ifranid of Tlemcen It is probable they lived in the region of modern-day Tunisia. Whilst little is known about her early life, she features as an important character in the Al-Sirah al-Hilaliyyah. One episode of the epic tells how Su'da fell in love with an Arab, but her father refuses to allow her to marry him, so as revenge, Su'da promises to help the Arab enemies of her Berber father. Another version tells how she falls in love with one of her father's prisoners, but the only way she can have him moved to her custody is if she blinds him.

In another episode in the story, she predicts the death of her own father al-Zanatı Khalıfa. Su'da's dream predicted that he would die in battle and, according to the epic, he rode out to battle knowing that he would die. In this final battle, al-Zanati Khalifa is beaten by the Arab prince Diyab. After the death of her father, there are several versions of what happened to Su'da. In a North African version of the story, both Su'da and her father are treated sympathetically and Su'da is still respected even after her betrayal of her Berber relatives becomes known.

In the Egyptian version, Su'da is captured and in mourning when Diyab proposes marriage to her. So smitten is he that he forgets his other intention in the storyline - that he was going to free his friend Mar'i who was a prisoner of the Berbers, so Su'da could marry him. She refuses Diyab and he is outraged; since she is his captive he "ordered his servants to increase the burden of labours". According to some versions of the epic Su'da writes a letter to a hero of the Berbers Al-Hasan, who fights Diyab and frees her. In other versions two Arab generals al-Hassan and Abu Zayd vow to rescue her after hearing about her situation - their action would divided the Arab force. A battle subsequently takes place between Arabs and Berbers, which is a draw. Usually, the victor would have married Su'da, but because of the draw, it is decided that whoever wins a horse race will marry Su'da. Diyab wins the horse race, but Su'da continues to reject him by claiming that they are "kin". Diyab is angered by her continuous refusal and stabs her. The wound causes her to die and her life ends in Qayrawan. After her death, Mar'i decided he loved her after all and his grief drives him to insanity. Diyab is imprisoned for her murder but escapes.

== Historiography ==
Since the Al-Sirah al-Hilaliyyah is an oral poem, there is no singular version of either the poem or the stories within it. They vary from region to region and change and reflect according to the periods in which they are recalled. One of the interesting aspects of the epic is its treatment of women and according to Allen James Fromherz, "women such as Su'da were portrayed as even more noble than the Arab heroes themselves". Comparisons have been drawn between Su'da and the character of Dido from The Aeneid.

== Legacy ==
In 2008 the Al-Sirah Al-Hilaliyyah epic, which includes versions of the life of Su'da, was added to UNESCO's Intangible Cultural Heritage of Humanity list.
