= Arabic musical instruments =

Arabic musical instruments are instruments developed and mainly used by people from the Arab world. Usage of these instruments, often more than a thousand years old, were once limited to the region's traditional and contemporary music, but today they are commonly used in world music and popular music from all around the world. Like most instruments they are broadly classified into three categories, string instruments (chordophones), wind instruments (aerophones), and percussion instruments.

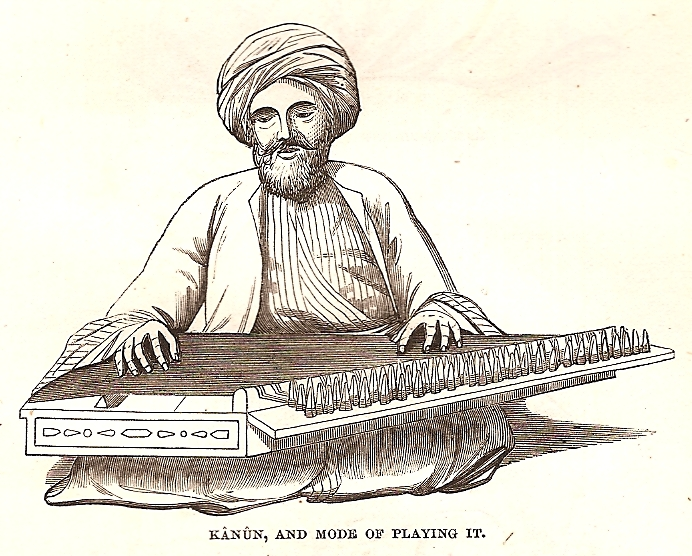
Drawing of Qanun player in 1859, Jerusalem

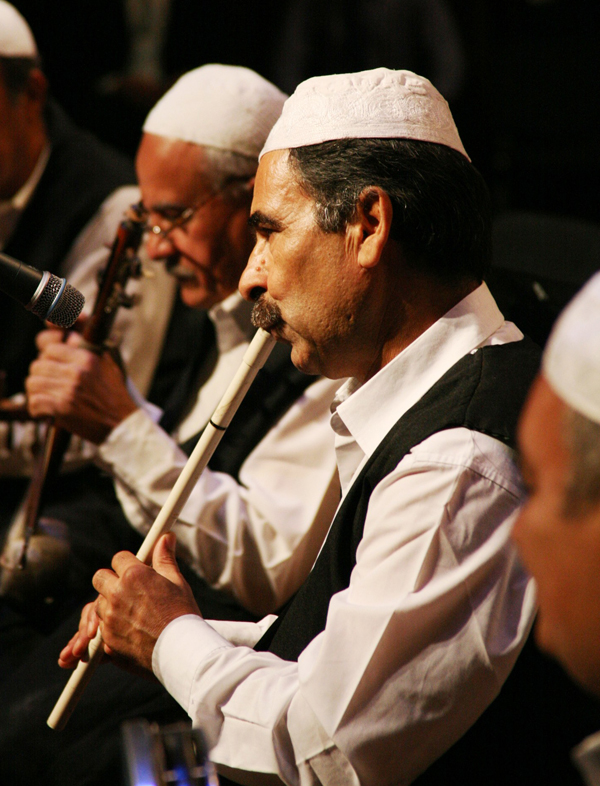
Traditional flute player from Iraqi folk troupe

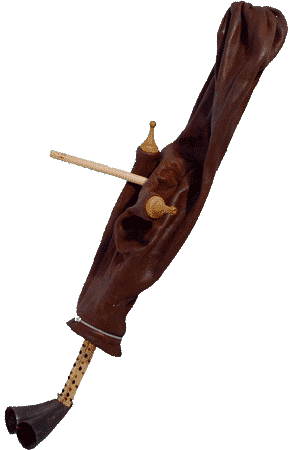
Mizwad, a type of bagpipes played mostly in Tunisia and Libya

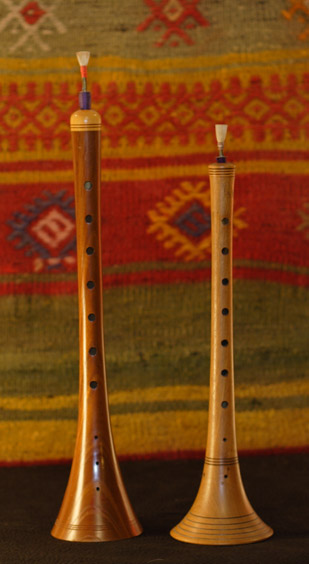
Mizmar ini Display

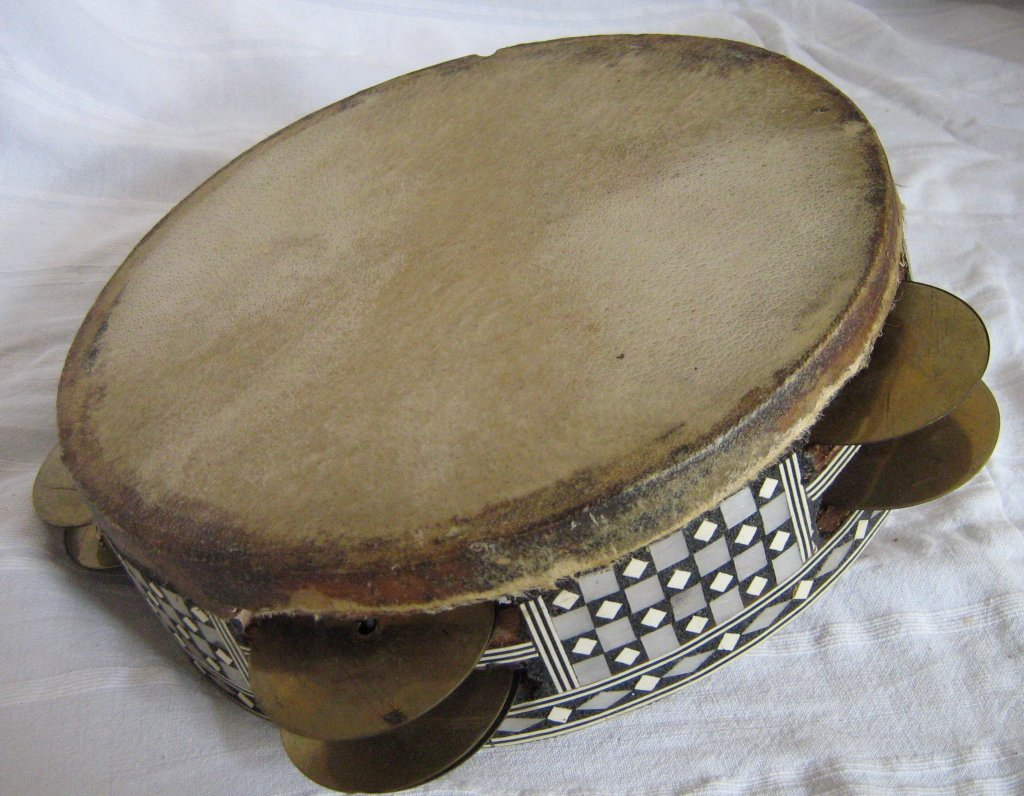
the Riqq is one of the instruments used only in the Egyptian and Arabic music, and in most of its varieties

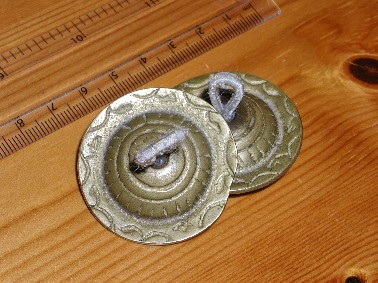
Sagat in Khan El-Khalili, Cairo

== Chordophones ==
=== Plucked lutes ===
- Oud
- Qanbūs
- Buzuq
- Awtar
- Lutar
- Sintir

=== Zithers ===
- Qanun
- Iraqi Santur

=== Bowed lutes ===
- Jawzah
- Guembri
- Kamancheh
- Rebab
- Pontic lyra (Kemençe)

=== Lyres ===
- Simsimiyya
- Kissar
- Tanbūra
- Jewish Lyre

== Aerophones ==
=== Flutes ===
- Ney
- Kawalah
- Salamiyah
- Minjayrah
- Shababah
- Shakuli
- Furayrah
- Kasab

=== Reed instruments ===
- Mizmar
- Khalul (Gulfian Mizmar)
- Rhaita
- Arghul
- Zumarah bi suwan
- Maqrunah
- Mijwiz
- Haban (Gulfian Bagpipe)
- Jirbah (East Tunisian Bagpipe)
- Mizwad (West Tunisian Bagpipe)
- Zughra (Moroccan Bagpipe)
- Saksifun (Arabic Saxophone)

=== Trumpets ===
- Nafir

== Percussion instruments ==
=== Drums and frame drums ===
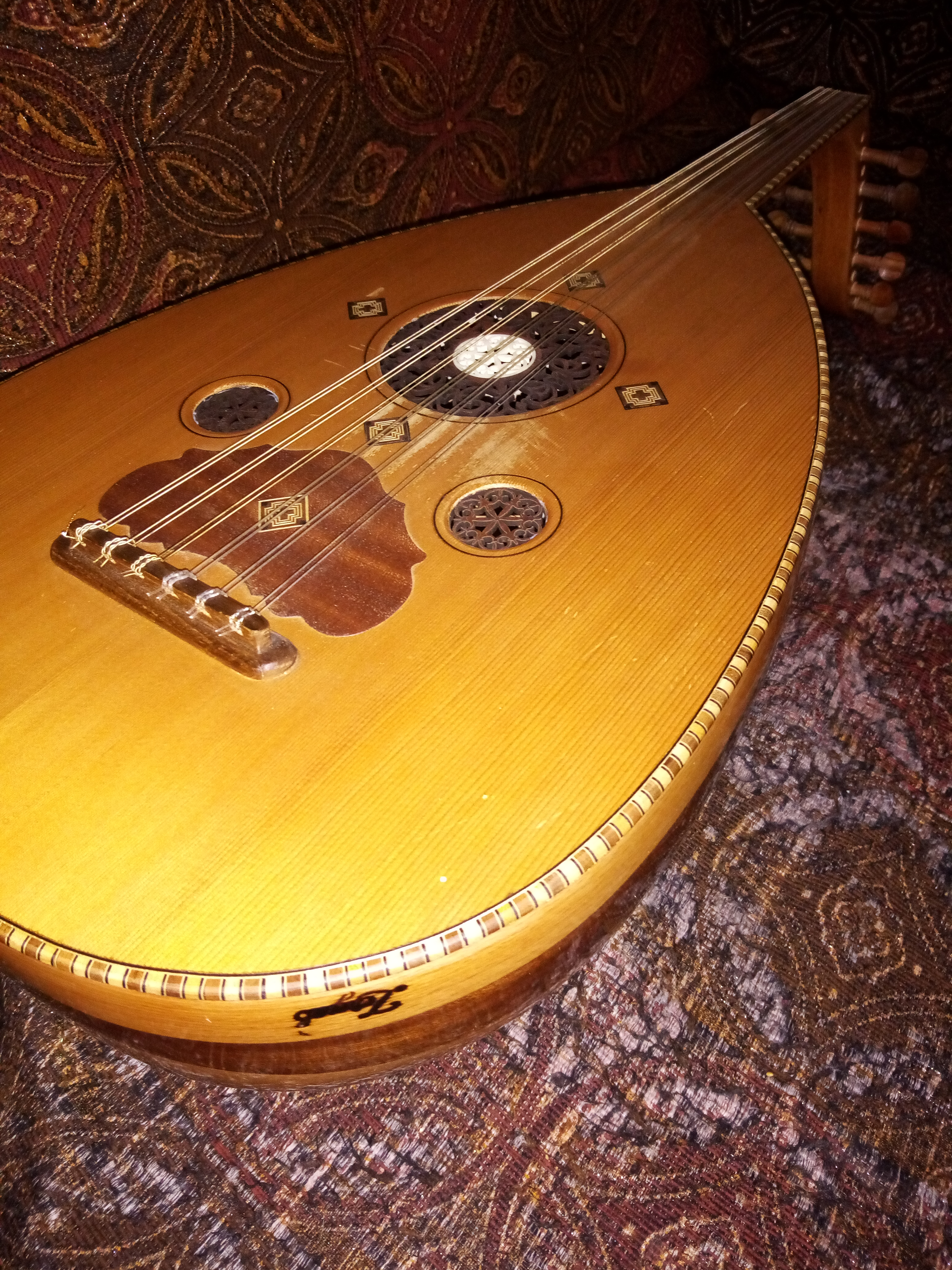

- Riq
- Daf
- Bendir
- Dumbaki (Darbuka)
- Duhulah
- Drinjah
- Bass Drinjah
- Khishbah
- Kasurah
- Tabl Tsjikangha
- Tabl Masanduw
- Tabl Bib
- Taarija
- Tar
- Tar Barashim (Shake Tar)
- Tar Mirjaf (Low Tar)
- Tar Saghul (High Tar)
- Katim
- Mirwas
- Zir (Naqarah)
- Qas'ah
- Tbilat
- Tabl Bahri (Khamari & Laauwb)
- Tabl Hajir (Khamari & Laauwb)
- Tabl Nasayfi (Khamari & Laauwb)
- Al Ras
- Mazhar

=== Other percussion ===
- Shakhshikhah (Sistrum)
- Sajat
- Turah (Egyptian Sajat)
- Twaysat (Gulf Sajat)
- Krakeb
- Hawan (instrument)
- Yahalah/Jahalah (Clay jug)
- Manjur
- Mihbaj
- Maalaqa
- Safqa (Arabic hand clap)
