= Sirat Bani Hilal =

Arabic epic recounting the Banu Hilal's journey from Najd to Maghreb

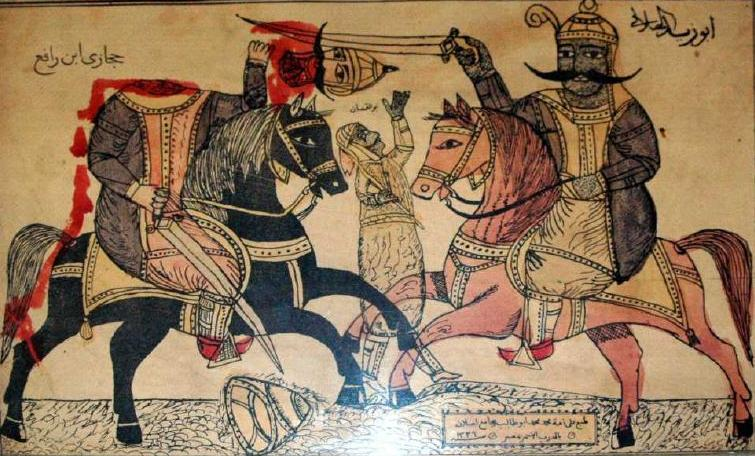
Abu Zayd al-Hilali (right) chopping off the head of Hegazi ibn Rafe'

Al-Sirah al-Hilaliyyah (Arabic: السيرة الهلالية, romanized: as-Sīra al-Hilāliyya, lit. 'Chronicle of the al-Hilalis'), also known as the Sirat Bani Hilal (سيرة بني هلال Sīra Banī Hilāl) or the al-Hilali epic, is an Arabic epic oral poem that recounts the tale of the journey of the Bedouin tribe of the Banu Hilal from Najd in Arabia to Tunisia and Algeria via Egypt. It is built around historical events that took place in the 11th century. The Banu Hilal were dominant in central North Africa for over a century before their annihilation by the Almohads. The epic is folkloric and oral, not having been committed to writing until relatively recent times, and doesn't have a well-defined date of creation. Of the dozen odd major oral epic poems that developed within the Arab folk tradition between the Middle Ages and the 19th century, Sirat Bani Hilal is today the only one that is still performed in its integral musical form. The longest notable version contains 1,000,000 lines, the poet could sing this version about 100 hours. The epic, once widespread throughout the Middle East, is today performed only in Egypt. In 2008 it was inscribed on UNESCO's Representative List of the Intangible Cultural Heritage of Humanity.

== Historical background ==
The event of Taghribat Bani Hilal has a basis in history, when Zirid broke away from the Fatimid empire in the 11th century. Early sources describe how the Fatimid Caliph sent the Banu Hilal to central North Africa lands to punish the Zirids for rebelling. Some Western historians dismiss these political motivations and doubt whether the migrations were politically motivated at all, instead to seeking to emphasize sociological and climatic motivations.

The epic has come to represent a foundational story for Arab identity in North Africa and the spread of Islam across the Sahara effecting the cultural heritage of countries as far south as Sahel states such as Mali and Niger.

The epic, performed since the 14th century, has been sung in verses by master poets who provide their own musical accompaniment on a percussion instrument. It is a unique literary and musical form that reflects in it Arab folk history, customs, beliefs, symbolism and traditions. Proverbs and puzzles derived from the epic are often a part of everyday conversation in many areas of the Middle East. Some of the prominent characters of the epic include Abu Zayd al-Hilali, Al-Zanaty Khalifa and Dhiyab Ibn Ghanem and there are several places in the Middle East that have been named for heroes mentioned in the epic. The Al-Sirah Al Hilaliyyah exalts courage and heroism and has in it themes of honour and revenge and of war and romance. It places events from a recalled and orally transferred history in their social and historical contexts and is a record of customs and practices and the food, clothing and lifestyles of these communities across time.

As a result of Arabic-speaking tribes settling Tunisia, this region's countryside became mainly Arabic speaking, and not Berber.

== Epic ==
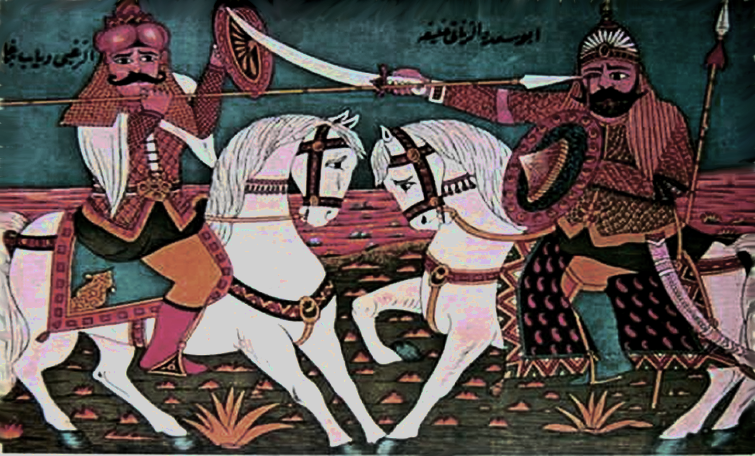
Egyptian engraving Dhiab bin Ghanim against Zanati Khalifa

The epic was inspired by these historic events. The Hilali leader Abu Zayd al-Hilali, here simply "Abu Zayd", is given an epic-styled birth: his mother, barren for eleven years, prays at a magic spring and invokes a black bird in hopes that she may become pregnant, saying "Give me a boy like this bird, / Black like this bird". Her request is taken literally and so her son is born with black skin, and because of that he and his mother are cast out by his people. "In Arab epic [black skin is] a sure sign of service status", but since he is noble is a born warrior and outcast simultaneously. His fate is to unite all the Bedouin tribes so they can conquer the Maghreb; before he can do that he must overcome two enemies: Khatfa, a Jewish leader, and Handal, an evil Muslim king.

Abu Zayd's rival is Khalifa al-Zanati, the hero of the tribe of Zenata. The war between the Arab Banu Hilal and the Berber Zenata is the main theme of the Sira named after Abu Zeid. Another character featured in the epic is Shehta (شحتة).

Women who feature in the epic include Su'da, a Berber princess who betrays her people and falls in love with an Arab.

== Transmission ==
The Sira was initially carried orally and handed down from generation to generation often in poem form via bards and then recorded later in many variants.

The Egyptian poet and writer Abdel Rahman el-Abnudi has made an exhaustive collection of the Sira, travelling from Egypt to Libya to Tunisia to document the variants of the epic.

The epic was narrated by storytellers in cafés well into the 20th century, much like the Baibars biography.

== The Hilali performance ==
The Hilali performers come from specific families for whom these performances were once used to be their sole source of income. The performers often begin their apprenticeships at the age of five and their training goes on for at least ten years. During the course of this demanding apprenticeship the poets perfect their memory, singing and instrument playing skills and learn the art of extemporaneous commentary to render traditional plots relevant to their contemporary audiences. Traditionally, the Al-Sirah Al-Hilaliyyah has been performed at social and private events such as weddings, circumcision ceremonies and private gatherings and the performances often last between 50 and 100 hours.

The Hilali performances have musical accompaniments mostly of wooden instruments. These include string instruments such as the rababa (the Arabic fiddle) and simsimiyya (lyre), wind instruments such as the salamiyyah, zummarah, mizmar, arghul and nay (an open ended flute) and percussion instruments such as the tabla and the tambourine.

== Cultural relevance in Egypt ==
Al-Sirah Al-Hilaliya is a living tradition that symbolises the oral traditions of communities of Upper and Lower Egypt and it blends ancient and modern music with songs and dances of the present tribes of Egypt. The Hilali thus has a considerable influence in shaping these communities’ vision, their acceptance or rejection of ideas and innovations and it helps integrate changes associated with development, modernisation in these societies.

== Threats to survival ==
Today there are very few folk poets who know Al-Sirah Al-Hilaliya in its entirety and given the socio economic changes in Egypt and the onslaught of globalisation, the Hilali epic is faced with the prospect of extinction. Documentation, classification and archiving of the epic and its artistic nuances are underway and its listing on the List of the Intangible Cultural Heritage of Humanity is expected to brighten its prospects of survival. The Al-Sirah Al-Hilaliyyah bears resemblance to the T'heydinn of Mauritania, another oral epic on the Intangible Cultural Heritage List, both as an oral history and in the source material of the exploits of the Beni Hilal tribe that both these epics derive from.

== See also ==
- Arabic Epic Literature
- T'heyddin
