= Shaddad =

Universal king in One Thousand and One Nights

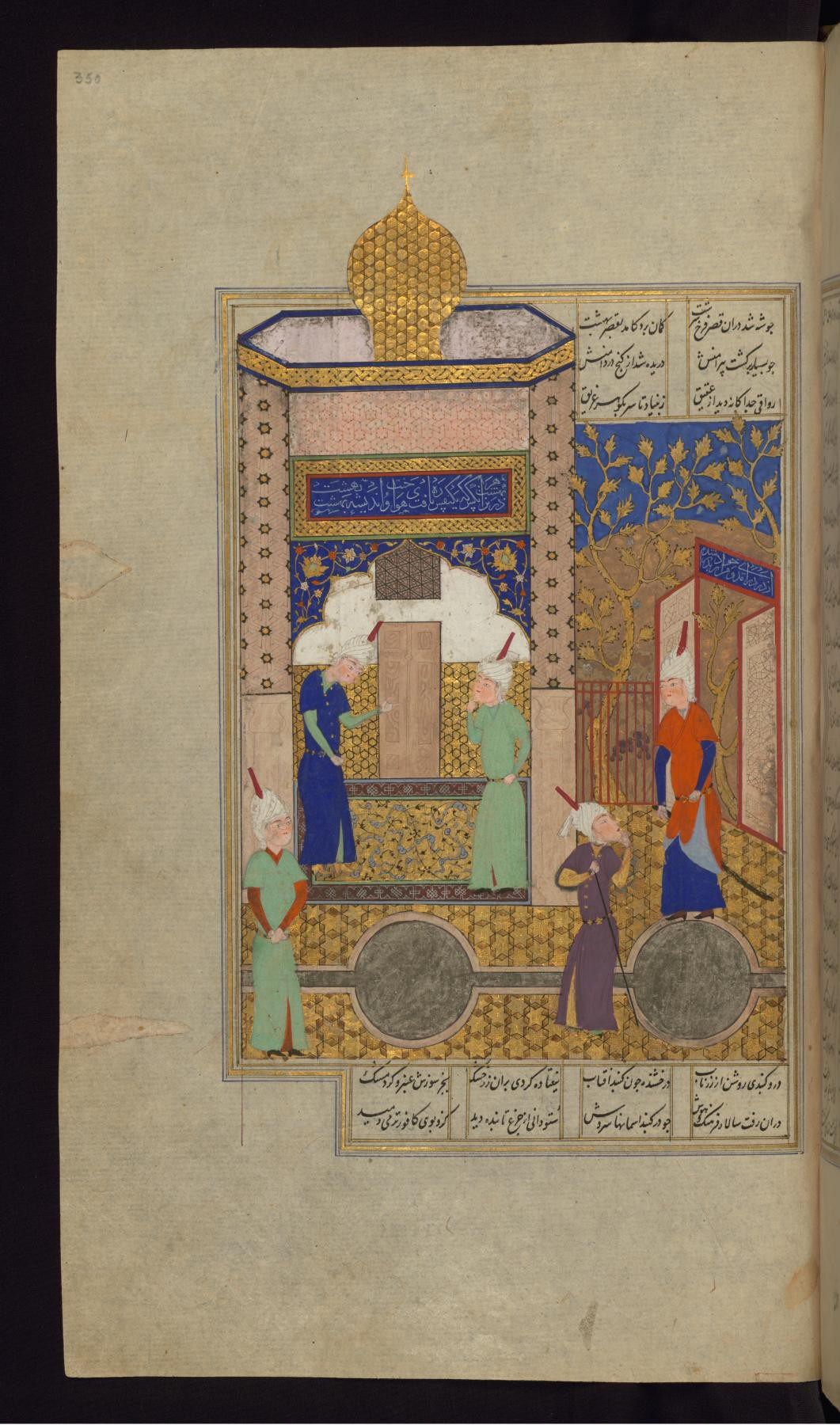
- The Paradise of Shaddad Palace Discovered by Alexander the Great from the Iskandarnameh, 1517-1518
- Burial: Southern Arabia
Names
- Shaddad bin ʿĀd
Temple name
- Temple in Ad
- Dynasty: ʿĀd tribe
- Religion: Arabian polytheism (possibly)

Shaddād (Arabic: شدّاد), also known as Shaddād bin ʽĀd (Arabic: شدّاد بن عاد), was the legendary tyrannical king in Arabian folklore. The lost Arabian city of Iram of the Pillars, which is mentioned in Sura 89 of the Qur'an, it typically attributed to being his realm. Various sources suggest Shaddad was the son of 'Ad al-Miltat ibn Saksak ibn Wa'il ibn Himyar.

According to the Qu'ran, Iram of the Pillars was a city of occult worshippers of stone idols, who defied the warnings of the prophet Hud. To punish them, God sent a drought. But the people would not repent, so they were destroyed by a furious wind, from which only Prophet Hud and a few believers emerged. Which later descended to the tribe of Thamud, which stayed in Northern Arabia around the Nabatean Kingdom. While Ad may have stayed in Southern Arabia around Yemen or Oman.

There is no mention of Shaddad in archaeological or Quranic records.

== In literary traditions ==
In antiquity, Arabs have attributed unknown historical lore to Shaddad. For instance, a tradition mentions Shaddad, the king of Ad, as the ruler who built the pyramids in Egypt and ruled there. Possibly making the claim of his rule extend further into Northern Arabia as well. The reason for this link may be the author attempting to attribute the Pyramids to the Arabs as part of their achievements. As many medieval Muslim writers did.

=== The One Thousand and One Nights ===
His story is found in the 277th through 279th nights of The Book of One Thousand and One Nights the tale describes him as a universal king who ruled over the world and the one who built the city of Iram. Brothers Shadīd (شديد) and Shaddād are said to have reigned in turn over the 1,000 Adite tribes, each consisting of several thousand men. It is said that Shaddad brutally subdued all Arabia and Iraq. Many Arab writers tell of an expedition of Shaddād that caused the Canaanite migration, their settling in Syria, and the Shepherd invasion of Egypt.
