= Sirat Sayf ibn Dhi-Yazan =

15th–16th century Arab romance

Sīrat Sayf ibn Dhī Yazan (Arabic: سيرة سيف بن ذي يزن, "The Biography of Sayf ibn Dhī Yazan") is a popular Arab romance dating to somewhere between the 15th and 16th centuries CE. A mixture of epic and pure fantasy, it is inspired by the life of Sayf ibn Dhī Yazan, a semi-legendary king of the pre-Islamic Himyarites (present-day Yemen) who reigned in the 6th century CE. He is known for defending Himyar against invasions from the Aksumite Empire (present-day Ethiopia), with the help of the Persian Sassanid Empire.

As a criticism of contemporary Mamluk politics the sīrat could provide comfort to the Egyptians despite their lack of victories against the Ethiopian Empire during the latter's medieval conquests and the following decades long Jihad. It sought to portray the triumph of Islam indirectly, by recalling one historical defeat of the Aksumite Empire (although Himyar itself was pre-Islamic and the Aksumite Empire survived into the ninth century CE, opposing Muslim expansion into Abyssinia). The regional conflicts were effectively a proxy war. The story's principal antagonist is named Sayf Ar'ed (meaning "sword of terror"), which was also the throne name of Ethiopian emperor Newaya Krestos (r. 1344–1372), one of the Negus (leaders of Ethiopia) during the war against the Muslim princes in the 14th and 15th centuries. The reference to this king is one of the elements that allow us to date the Sīrat as a late work.

== Plot summary ==
The story revolves around three main locations which form cycles. Yemen, the land of origin, forms the departure point for the epic which gets going very quickly with the voyage of Dhū Yazan, father of the hero, to Abyssinia – this is the second location of the epic where all the events take place linked with the youth of the hero. Finally the Egyptian cycle begins with the quest for the Book of the Nile; if Sayf ibn Dhī Yazan find this book, he will be able to sail down the course of the Nile as far as Egypt the pure land and refuge of the hero and of his peers tyrannized by the Negus Sayfa Ar'ed.

=== The Yemeni Cycle ===
The romance opens with a prologue retracing the conquests of Dhū Yazan, the hero’s father, in Yemen and further afield in Arabia. We are told how he and his armies were converted to monotheism thanks to his vizier Yathrib, a learned man who had read the holy books, and who believed in the imminent arrival of Muhammad. They followed a kind of Islam even before Islam which was known as the ‘Religion of Abraham (Ibrāhīm)’, which the hero has as his mission to defend and to propagate everywhere. Once Dhū Yazan has converted he allows his vizier to found the city of Yathrib, which would become the future Medina, city of Muḥammad. The victorious conquests of Dhū Yazan take him as far as Abyssinia. Having fallen for the charms of this region he settles and founds the city of al-Hamra, incurring the wrath of Sayfa Ar’ed, the ruler of the kingdom. He marries Qamarīyah, a sorceress sent by Sayfa Ar'ed to poison him but who fails in her mission Despite everything she manages to make him fall in love with her and he names he his regent after his death. Eager to achieve power for herself, a few months later she abandons their infant Sayf in the desert.

=== The Abyssinian Cycle ===
Sayf is then found by an Ethiopian king, Afrah, who raises him like his own son and calls him Wash Al-Fala, completely unaware of the identity and the royal origins of Sayf. Sayf is brought up bearing his new name and falls in love with his milk sister, the daughter of Afrah, called Shamah. After waiting for his reputation to grow sufficiently, Wash Al-Fala asks for the hand of Shamah. In order to prove that he deserves this he is given a series of tasks. During the course of one of these Wash Al-Fala gets to know a hermit who reveals to him the secret of his birth and his true identity. Wash Al-Fala resumes his original name Sayf ibn Dhī Yazan, converts to Islam and takes his destiny into his own hands. Here the story is actually about the doctrine of predestination. But the negus Sayfa Ar’ed does not see this possible union in a good light because he is afraid that Sayf will realize the curse of Noah through the descendants of his son Shem on his son Ham, the Abyssinians. The tests given to Sayf were actually intended to prevent any notion of marriage and to get rid of the young man. These adventures lead to the Egyptian Cycle through the quest for the Book of the History of the Nile.

=== The Egyptian Cycle ===
Now the hero has the mission to redirect the waters of the Nile, held back by the Ethiopians, back towards Egypt. The adventures centering on this quest form the myth of the foundation of Egypt. Sayf, with the aid of beings with supernatural powers manages to free the waters of the Nile and directs them into Egypt, making a prosperous and rich land where he settles.

Once this mission has been completed Sayf marries Shamah, and then he and his descendants are able to put their minds towards the third part of his work: propagating Islam. After having passed on his power to his son Miṣr (whose name means literally "Egypt"). Sayf retires alone to a mountain where he can dedicate himself to his faith.

== Primary sources and literary forms ==
=== The Sīrats ===
The Sīrat Sayf ibn Dhī Yazan is one of five popular epic sīrats, or "biographies." The best known of these, and the most studied, is the Romance of Baybars. Jean-Claude Garcin has gathered a collective of researchers to produce articles on this work in Lecture du roman de Baybars, which permits an historical approach to this type of source.

=== Primary sources of the Sīrat ===
The Sīrat Sayf ibn Dhī Yazan exists in a number of different manuscripts. The oldest appears to be the manuscript of the Biblioteca Ambrosiana in Milan (Ar. no. CXLVIII) dating from the 16th century in nine volumes, and some eight hundred folios. Two other manuscripts are available in France : the manuscript in the Bibliothèque Nationale de France (Manuscript no. 3812-3813) dating from 1197/1783 and that in the library in Strasbourg (Ar. no 4279), the second volume of a complete manuscript of the Thousand and One Nights (no 4278-4281). It is in fact a later version (fol. 81a – 419a) dating from the 19th century. Finally there are some other manuscripts known in Cairo, dating respectively to 1294/ 1877 and to 1322/1904

=== Editions ===
The studies of the sīrat also refer to an edited version published by Makatabat al-Jamhūrīyah in Cairo. Volumes 1 to 4 of this edition were particularly used by Lena Jayyusi, the author of a translation containing narrative passages from the sīrat in English. Finally a French version was proposed by Ali Bey in Istanbul the 19th century.

== A Hybrid Work with Literary, Mythological and Religious Influences ==
=== The Omnipresence of Magic: a Characteristic of the Sīrat Sayf ibn Dhī Yazan ===
The sīrat is striking by the importance it gives to the fantastic and to fables. During the course of his adventures, related very briefly above, the hero is constantly helped or hindered by supernatural personalities. He is, for example, assisted by Khiḑr, master of the occult world, in the most critical moments; he is helped by the soothsayer ‘Aqīlah in his quest for the Book of the History of the Nile. In the opposite camp we find numerous motifs of oriental and Islamic phantasmagoria such as jinns and ghouls which even assume the form of Sayf's mother Qamarīyah. Sayfa Ar’ed, Sayf's enemy, is himself advised by two magi who are sorcerers : Saqardis and Saqardiyun who are the careful planners of the tests given to Sayf in the hope of leading him to his destruction. Thus the characters confront each other, some aided by talismans in the Islamic tradition and some not, representing good and evil in the service of the Divine Will.

=== Influences Taken from Arabo-Persian Literature ===
Despite this flood of the fantastic and of magic, there are quite a number of motifs taken from the literary tradition of a Thousand and One Nights, the sīrat of Sayf is essentially a collection of various tales. Thus for example the love story of Sayf undoubtedly finds its parallel in another folk tale from Arab literature: the Story of ‘Ajīb and Gharīb. Sayf falls in love, just like Gharīb, with the daughter of his adopted father and the challenges which he faces are similar to those of Gharīb. To this Indo-Mesopotamian base we can add other rather surprising influences. The episode of the Admirers of the Rams which depicts Shamah in the world of giants is inspired by a Buddhist tale from the Chinese Tripitaka translated by Edouard Chavannes. This take had also been reworked by the Indian Avadanas under the title of The Servant and the Ram. Finally experts can also recognize the influence of popular stories and legends originating in Ancient Egypt and from the Pharaonic civilization, which mean that the sīrat is an entirely different kind of Egyptian work.

=== The Importance of the Myths ===
Finally it is impossible to discuss the question of literary influences on the text without speaking about the importance given to myths in the sīrat: the myth / doctrine of predestination that topples towards the ethnological myth of the foundation of Egypt. The hero, deprived of his real identity after being abandoned by his mother, gets it back thanks to the help of individuals who are waiting for his coming, and in this way he fulfills his destiny Indeed, he guides the liberated waters of the Nile which give life to Egypt, which had hitherto been completely virgin soil, where the hero can settle and found his realm, and that of his descendants. These various aspects chrystalize around the influence of the legend of Moses in the sīrat. Aboubakr Chraïbi defends this idea in his article and demonstrates well the parallels between Moses and Sayf: abandoned by the mother, adopted by the enemy king, realization of a prophecy (Moses freeing the Jews enslaved by the Egyptians, in the case of Sayf realizing Noah’s vow by enslaving the Hamites) Sayf appears like a new prophet and the Egyptians, criticized since the Mosaic era, seem to be erased by the founding of a new kingdom, an incarnation of goodness. Thus the Egyptian image is considerably improved, something that was not without significance in the historical context at the time this work was composed.

== An Underlying Criticism of Mamlūk Politics in the 15th century ==
=== The Role of the Authors’ Anonymity ===
In estimating that the Sīrat of Sayf ibn Dhī Yazan dates back to around the 15th century we are placing it in the historic context of the Mamlūk Empire. Now it so happens that at that time the Mamlūks were losing popularity among the Egyptian population, and that there was a resurgence of the established political Islam, especially because of the growing menace of the Ottoman Empire. This criticism of the regime underlies the sīrat and it is allowed to be expressed because the authors remain anonymous. This anonymity enables them to write openly and tackle themes that would not be possible in an Islamic empire where the Ulamā, important religious scholars, are firmly opposed to such romantic biographies.

=== Sayf ibn Dhī Yazan: an Exemplary Model of a Muslim Sovereign ===
The hero Sayf ibn Dhī Yazan is an example, the ideal Muslim prince, and more precisely a practical example of Arab chivalry (furūsiyyah): handsome, charismatic, intelligent, courageous, generous and resigned to fate. This model is diffused by means of the literature of notable Cairenes before it became popular literature, and may have had the objective of reminding the Mamlūks of the military methods that had contributed to their success. Sayf ibn Dhī Yazan is thus the incarnation of a jihād figure, having defeated the Abyssinians, who are presented as worshipers of Saturn and therefore as unbelievers. The chronological gap between the historical existence of Sayf ibn Dhī Yazan and his anachronistic and romanticized use in the sīrat allows a freedom of auspicious tone to the criticism of the regime at that time. The way that Sayf ibn Dhī Yazan is built up as a hero propagating Islam was without doubt encouraged by the event that triggered writing of the Sīrat, which was according to Jean-Claude Garcin the capture of Zeila in modern-day Somalia by Yeshaq I, the Ethiopian Negus, en 1415 and the jihād that followed it until 1445 without the Muslims getting the upper hand over the Ethiopian power. In fact the sīrat could provide comfort to the Egyptians despite their lack of victories.

=== Mirror of Social Questions Burning with Topicality ===
The theme of conflict between Muslims and Christians, Egyptians and Ethiopians, also enables us to examine a topic of hot debate at the time this work was written: that of relations between blacks and whites. The Christian Ethiopians close to the Egyptian Coptic community, black eunuchs are everywhere in Cairo in the 15th century and this fact actually raises concerns for the population, as does the question of being pro-slavery. The Sīrat Sayf ibn Dhī Yazan gives a ready-made justification for the domination of the Arabs over the Ethiopians and over the blacks in general, by means of a Muslim and Medieval interpretation of the Biblical text of the curse of Ham. According to the tradition used in the sīrat, Noah was asleep when the wind lifted his clothes, leaving him naked before the eyes of his sons: Sam and Ham. Ham made fun of his father while Sam covered his father up, while reproaching his brother for his lack of respect. This altercation woke Noah who, learning of the reaction of his son Ham, declared: "O Ham! May God blacken your face and make all your progeny black and end up one day serving the white progeny of your brother Sam." The Biblical text in Genesis (9, 20-27), makes no mention of a gust of wind that lifted Noah’s clothes, but rather speaks about him having been intoxicated. Since it was inconceivable in Islam for a prophet to have been drunk, the Muslim theologians have modified the biblical text. The question of Ham’s skin being blackened as a result of Noah’s curse appears nowhere else in the Bible. In fact the curse does not actually concern Ham, but his son Canaan, so the biblical text has been reworked. This Muslim exegesis was very current in the medieval period.

== Bibliography ==
- Joseph Chelhod: "La geste du roi Sayf", Revue de l’Histoire des religions, Volume 171, no 2, 1967, p. 181 – 205.
- Aboubakr Chraïbi: "Le roman de Sayf Ibn Dî Yazan; sources, structures et argumentation", Studia Islamica, 84, 1996, p. 113 – 134.
- Jean-Claude Garcin: "Sira(s) et histoire", Arabica, v. 51, fascicule no 1, 2004, p. 33 – 54.
- Jean-Claude Garcin: "Sira(s) et histoire II », Arabica, v. 51, fascicule no 3, 2004, p. 223 – 257.
- Jean-Pierre Guillaume: "Sayf Ibn Dhi Yazan », Encyclopédie de l’Islam, tome VIII, 1995, p. 105 – 106.
- Lena Jayyusi:The Adventures of Sayf Ben Dhi Yazan: An Arab Folk Epic, Indiana, Indiana University Press, 1996.

M.C. Lyons: The Arabian Folk Epic.. Cambridge, 1995.

- Harry Norris: "Sayf b. Di Yazan and the book of the Nile", Quaderni di Studi Arabi, no 7, 1989, p. 125 – 151.
- Christian Robin: "Du nouveau sur les Yazʾanides", dans Proceedings of the Seminar for Arabian Studies, 16, 1986, p. 181–197.
- Christian Robin: "La persécution des chrétiens de Nagrān et la chronologie ḥimyarite", in collaboration with Joëlle Beaucamp and Françoise Briquel-Chatonnet, in the Journal Aram, 11-12, 1999-2000 (issued September 2001), p. 15–83.
