= Salamiyyah (flute) =

A Salamiyyah is an open-ended small reed flute seen in Egypt. It is listed as a folk instrument as it is made from wood and is a part of folk music, specifically Sufi songs and dances. It is an Arabic musical instrument in the aerophones category.
