= Abu Zayd al-Hilali =

11th-century Arab leader and hero of the 'Amirid tribe

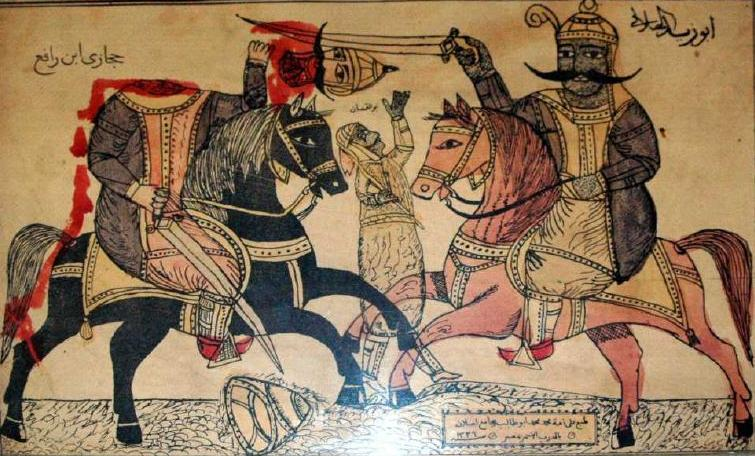
A 1908 Egyptian painting depicting Abu Zayd al-Hilali

Abū Zayd Barakāt ibn Rizq al-Hilalī (Arabic: أبو زيد بركات ابن رزق الهلالي) was an 11th-century Arab leader and legendary hero of the Banu Hilal and a character of the Sirat Bani Hilal.

His father was Rizq who was the ruler of the Bilād al-Sarw and his mother was Khadrāʾ who was daughter of the Sharif of Mecca. He had dark skin.

On the orders of the Ismaili Fatimid caliph, Abu Zayd moved his tribe to Ifriqiya to punish the Zirids for adopting Sunniism. The Banu Hilali weakened largely the Zirid state and sacked Kairouan. The event was fictionalized in the epic Taghribat Bani Hilal. In the epic it is said that he was murdered by his rival Dhieb bin Ghanim.

In a modern context, the events experienced by Bani Hilal and their cousins Bani Sulayma at the time of Abu Zayd have been portrayed in two Arabic TV shows. The first modern drama discussing these events is the 1997 Egyptian show "Al-Seera Al-Hilalia", composed of three 38-episode seasons following Abu Zeyd throughout the migration from Najd to Ifriqiya. A second TV drama was published in Syria, "Abu Zayd al-Hilali". Published in 2004, it has garnered millions of views on YouTube and licensed television. Of course, as all shows attempt to entertain as well educate society, these two shows underwent an exemplary attempt at illustrating the honour and dignity systems of ancient Arabs and how their traditions affected their day-to-day life, even in the midst of battle.
