= Delhemma =

Medieval epic of Arabic literature

Delhemma or Sirat Delhemma ("Tale of Lady Delhemma") is a popular epic of the Arabic literature regarding the Arab–Byzantine wars of the Umayyad and early Abbasid periods.

== Title variations ==
The full name of the work, as given in its 1909 edition, is Sīrat al-amīra Dhāt al-Himma wa-waladihā ʿAbd al-Wahhāb wa ’l-amīr Abū Muḥammad al-Baṭṭāl wa-ʿUqba shaykh al-ḍalāl wa-Shūmadris al-muḥtāl, or "The Life of amira Dhat al-Himma, mother of ʿAbd al-Wahhāb, and of amir Abū Muḥammad al-Baṭṭāl, the master of error ʿUqba, and astute Shūmadris". The work is known by a series of other titles after the main personnages, including Sīrat Dhāt al-Himma wa-l-Baṭṭāl ("Tale of Dhāt al-Himma and al-Battal") and simply Sīrat Delhemma.

== Plot ==
In its 1909 Cairo edition, the tale comprises 70 sections in seven volumes and 5,084 pages. The subject matter of the epic draws from the long history of Arab–Byzantine wars under the Umayyad and early Abbasid caliphs until the reign of al-Wathiq in the mid-9th century, with elements from later events, focusing on the exploits of two rival Arab tribes, the Banu Kilab, who furnish the main characters, and the Banu Sulaym.

The tale begins with the rivalry of the two tribes during the early Umayyad period when the Sulaym held command over both. It continues with the assumption of command by the Kilab and the participation of the Kilabite al-Sahsa in the campaigns of Prince Maslama ibn Abd al-Malik against the Eastern Romans, including the Siege of Constantinople (717–718), his adventures in the desert and his death. Al-Sahsa's two sons, Zalim and Mazlum, then quarrel over their father's inheritance. Mazlum's daughter, Fatima, the eponymous heroine of the epic, is abducted by the Tayy, among whom she becomes a fierce warrior and is named al-Dalhama. This is possibly the feminine form of the name Dalham ("wolf"), but is more usually interpreted as a corruption of the honorific Dhat al-Himma, "woman of noble purpose", which also appears in the tale along with other variants, the most common of which is Delhemma.

At the time of the Abbasid revolution (ca. 750), the Sulaym under Abdallah ibn Marwan regained the leadership of the Arab tribes thanks to their support of the Abbasids. Through the intervention of Delhemma, the Kilab acquiesced to this change, and together with the Kilab, they participated in the renewed border warfare with the Romans. The Kilab settle in the city of Malatya, while the Sulaym take over the fortress of Hisn al-Kawkab. Delhemma's cousin, al-Harith (the son of Zalim), manages to make her his wife thanks to a drug, and she bears a son, Abd al-Wahhab, who has black skin. When he grows up, he takes over the leadership of the Kilab, and his and his mother's subsequent exploits in the wars against Byzantium are the central themes of the epic. He is assisted by the cunning al-Battal, a Sulaymi who joins the Kilab and is opposed by the rest of the Sulaym, including the treacherous qadi Uqba, who has secretly converted to Christianity, and the amir of Malatya, Amr ibn Abdallah (or Ubaydallah), who distrusts the Kilab even though he owes his life to Delhemma. At the same time, Delhemma's husband, al-Harith, has gone over to the Byzantines with a band of Arabs and converted to Christianity. In turn, the Muslims find allies among the Romans, such as the crypto-Muslim Maris, the Byzantine emperor's chamberlain, or the lord of a border fortress, Yanis (John).

The epic follows its protagonists in a series of campaigns and adventures during the reigns of Harun al-Rashid, al-Amin, al-Ma'mun, and al-Mu'tasim. To the end, the narrative is dominated by the Kilab-Sulaym rivalry, fuelled by Uqba's treacherous hounding of the Kilab and his spying for the Romans. The Kilab leaders, including Delhemma and Abd al-Wahhab, are captured several times by the Romans and the Abbasid caliph due to Uqba's machinations, only to be set free after various adventures. Al-Battal plays a crucial counterpart to the traitor Uqba, each seeking to capture and eliminate the other. Al-Battal often saves the situation through his exploits, which bring him as far as Western Europe and the Maghreb. Successive Eastern Roman rulers attack and sack Malatya but are either driven off or defeated by the exploits of Delhemma or Abd al-Wahhab. On the other hand, the Kilab frequently aid the emperors in recovering their capital, Constantinople, from usurpers or Western (Frankish) invaders.

Finally, Uqba's treachery is unmasked, and in the last and longest section, he is pursued by the Caliph al-Mu'tasim and the Kilabite heroes across several countries "from Spain to Yemen" before being crucified before Constantinople. On its return, the Muslim army is ambushed in a defile by the Romans, and only 400 men, including the Caliph, al-Battal, Delhemma, and Abd al-Wahhab, managed to escape, but the amir Amr is killed. In retaliation, al-Mu'tasim's successor al-Wathiq launched a campaign against Constantinople, where he installed a Muslim governor and rebuilt the mosque first constructed by Maslama and al-Sahsah. The tale then describes the death of Delhemma and Abd al-Wahhab and the final days of al-Battal, who lived long enough to witness the resumption of Roman attacks later in the century. He dies at Ancyra, and his tomb remains hidden until the Turks (in some versions, the Mamluks) arrived and rediscovered it.

== Analysis ==
=== Dating ===
Although the sources on which the romance draws date to the 9th century and before, the earliest secure references to the tales of al-Battal and Delhemma are from Egypt in the mid-12th century, and the work in general was clearly written as a response to the impact of the Crusades. However, Henri Grégoire suggested that at least the basis of the tale of Delhemma must have existed before ca. 1000, as it is used in its Byzantine epic analogue, the story of Digenes Akritas.

=== Narrative sources ===
According to the French orientalist Marius Canard, the tale draws on two original traditions. The first portion, centred on the exploits of al-Sahsah and the early years of his granddaughter, the eponymous Delhemma, reflects a "Syro-Umayyad and bedouin" tradition, which includes typically bedouin elements in the tradition of Antarah ibn Shaddad, but combines them with the semi-mythical tradition that grew around the exploits of the real-life 8th-century Umayyad general Abdallah al-Battal, whose role is taken over by al-Sahsah. The second and longest portion, from section six on, reflects the events of the Abbasid period and probably draws on a cycle of tales about the real-life amir of Malatya, Amr ibn Ubaydallah al-Aqta, and the tribe of the Sulaym. However, later retelling fused the two traditions in favour of the Kilab, who took over the prominent role of the Sulaym in the second tradition. Canard suggests that this came about because of the surrender of Malatya to the Eastern Romans in 934, which discredited the Sulaym, whereas the Kilab continued to play a conspicuous role in the wars against Byzantium throughout the 10th century. Thus the Kilabites Dalhama and her son Abd al-Wahhab—in reality, like al-Battal, an Umayyad military leader—are the chief heroes, and the amir Amr ibn Ubaydallah is reduced to a secondary role. Similarly, the Sulaym are assigned the traitorous qadi Uqba, while the hero al-Battal has been moved from the Umayyad era, where he properly belongs, to the second, as a Kilabite. As Canard remarks, in the tale he plays the role of the cunning Ulysses to Abd al-Wahhab's bold and direct Achilles.

=== Historical references ===
The romance purports to be an accurate history, but, as Canard comments, in reality this means an "often very vague recollection of a certain number of facts and historical personages, garbed in romantic trappings and presented in an imaginary way, with constant disregard for chronology and probability". From the Umayyad era, the chief elements are those concerning the life of Maslama ibn Abd al-Malik, while the Abbasid material is treated unevenly: major events such as the founding of Baghdad on 30 July 762 or the Fourth Fitna between the brothers al-Amin and al-Ma'mun over the succession to the Abbasid caliphate beginning in 811 are recorded in passing, while other episodes are heavily distorted, such as the attribution of the theft of the Black Stone from Mecca to a Kharijite in Harun al-Rashid's time (r. 786–809– ) instead of to the Qarmatians, an Isma'ili offshoot, during their Sack of Mecca on January 11, 930. Similarly, al-Battal's adventures in the West feature the far later Almoravid dynasty and Almohad Caliphate, as well as the Umayyad state of Córdoba and the Latin Christians of northern Iberia.

For its Byzantine material, the romance draws upon Maslama's Siege of Constantinople (717–718), the establishment of the fortified Thughur frontier zone—of which Malatya was one of the major centres—under al-Mansur, Mu'tasim's Sack of Amorium in 838, and the exploits of Amir Umar al-Aqta, and of his Paulician ally Karbeas, who is possibly the archetype of Yanis. In addition, many elements were taken from the 10th-century warfare between the Hamdanid amir Sayf al-Dawla and the Eastern Roman generals John Kourkouas and Nikephoros Phokas, who are recognizable as the characters of Qarqiyas and Takafur in the romance, while the usurper emperor Armanus in all likelihood echoes Romanos I Lekapenos (r. 920–944– .

Other influences are later still: the conflict for the headship of the tribes in Syria reflects the realities of the Ayyubid dynasty rather than that of the Abbasid Caliphate, the Crusaders and the Seljuk dynasty appear, while customs and manners are those of the Levant of the 10th–13th centuries. Battles against the Franks i.e. the Crusaders, are an important recurring motif in the narrative. In general, according to Canard, the author or authors had a "very superficial knowledge of history and geography," although they "seem to be better documented on Christian practices, religious festivals and formulae", especially regarding the Eastern Romans.

== English translations and paraphrases ==
- Abd Al-Hakim, Shawqi, Princess Dhat al-Himma: The Princess of High Resolve, trans. by Omaima Abou-Bakr, Prism Literary Series, 5 (Guizeh: Prism Publications, 1995): paraphrase.
- Kruk, Remke, The Warrior Women of Islam: Female Empowerment in Arabic Popular Literature (London: I.B. Tauris, 2014): summary.
- Lyons, M. C., The Arabian Epic, 3 vols (Cambridge: Cambridge University Press, 1995), III: paraphrase.
- Magidow, Melanie (ed. and trans.), The Tale of Princess Fatima, Warrior Woman: The Arabic Epic of Dhat al-Himma, Penguin Books (2021): partial edition and translation.

== Sources ==
- Canard, Marius (1961). "Les principaux personnages du roman de chevalerie arabe Ḏāt al-Himma wa-l-Baṭṭāl". Arabica (in French). 8 (2): 158–173. doi:10.1163/157005861X00377. ISSN 0570-5398. JSTOR 4055170.
- Canard, Marius (1991). "D̲h̲u 'l-Himma". The Encyclopedia of Islam, New Edition, Volume II: C–G. Leiden and New York: BRILL. pp. 233–239. ISBN 90-04-07026-5.
- Dadoyean, Seda B.; Parsumean-Tatoyean, Seda (1997). The Fatimid Armenians: Cultural and Political Interaction in the Near East. Brill. ISBN 9789004108165.
- Dedes, Georgios (1996). The Battalname, an Ottoman Turkish Frontier Epic Wondertale: Introduction, Turkish Transcription, English Translation and Commentary (PDF). Sources of Oriental Languages and Literatures. Cambridge, MA: Harvard University, Department of Near Eastern languages and Literatures.
