= Sirat al-Zahir Baybars =

Egyptian folkloric epic poem

Sīrat al-Ẓāhir Baybars (Arabic: سيرة الظاهر بيبرس, lit. 'Biography of al-Zahir Baibars'), also known as al-Sīrah Ẓāhirīyah (السيرة الظاهرية), is a long Egyptian folkloric epic poem that narrates the life and heroic achievements of the Mamluk Sultan al-Zahir Baibars al-Bunduqdari.

The epic revolves around Baybars's struggle against the Franks, the Crusaders who threatened Egypt and the Levant. The work portrays Baybars as an ideal Islamic warrior and a just ruler.

== Literary features ==
The poem features romantic images of gallant cavaliers, soldiers and explorers. For example, in telling the tale of the Syrian Ismailis of the Mamluk period the Banu Isma’il, descendants of ‘Ali, are depicted as the archetype of honor and justice. Female members of the community such as Shamsa also feature in the Mamluk tale. Here, the Banu Isma’il is charged with special tasks such as saving Baybars from captivity by Genoese pirates.

== See also ==
- Baibars al-Bunduqdari
