= 2023 Iran–Saudi Arabia summit =

Diplomatic meeting in Beijing, China

- Host country: China
- Date: 6–10 March 2023
- Cities: Beijing
- Participants: (China) Wang Yi; (Saudi Arabia) Musaad bin Mohammed Al Aiban; (Iran) Ali Shamkhani

Key points

The 2023 Iran–Saudi Arabia summit was a high-level meeting between Iran and Saudi Arabia held in Beijing from March 6 to 10, 2023. Under the mediation of China, Saudi Arabia and Iran, which are considered rivals in the Middle East, agreed to restore bilateral diplomatic relations at the ambassadorial level.

== Background ==
From 2021 to 2022, Saudi Arabia and Iran hosted multiple rounds of dialogue in Iraq and Oman. In December 2022, Chinese leader Xi Jinping visited Saudi Arabia and attended the first China-Arab States Summit and the China-Gulf Arab States Cooperation Council Summit. During this period, he met with leaders of several Arab countries, including King Salman of Saudi Arabia. In February 2023, Iranian President Ebrahim Raisi visited China and expressed his welcome to China's initiative to achieve security and stability in the Middle East and promote dialogue among countries in the Persian Gulf region. Wang Di, Director of the Department of Asian and African Affairs of the Ministry of Foreign Affairs of China, said in an interview with People's Daily that Xi Jinping personally worked with the leaders of the two countries during his state visit to Saudi Arabia in December 2022 and his reception of Iranian President Raisi in February 2023 to support the development of good-neighborly and friendly relations between Saudi Arabia and Iran.

== Agreement ==
The meeting was held from March 6 to 10, 2023 at the initiative of the government of China and under the chairmanship and coordination of Wang Yi, the Director of the Office of the Central Foreign Affairs Commission. Saudi delegation was led by Minister of State and National Security Advisor Musaad bin Mohammed Al Aiban, while the Iranian delegation was led by Secretary of the Supreme National Security Council Ali Shamkhani. On March 10, Saudi Arabia and Iran reached an agreement to resume bilateral diplomatic relations. China, Saudi Arabia and Iran jointly signed and issued a joint statement, emphasizing that the three parties will work together to uphold the basic norms of international relations, respect the sovereignty of all countries, not interfere in the internal affairs of other countries, and promote international and regional peace and security.

== Reactions ==
=== Countries ===
- Iran: Foreign Minister Hossein Amir-Abdolrahyan said that Iranian diplomatic missions are actively supporting preparations for more regional initiatives.
- Saudi Arabia: Minister of State Musaad bin Mohammed Al Aiban stated that the leaders of the Kingdom of Saudi Arabia welcome the initiative of the Government of the People's Republic of China, which is based on the consistent and continuous practices of the Kingdom of Saudi Arabia since its founding, adheres to the principle of good neighborliness, does its utmost to strengthen regional and global security and stability, and resolves differences through dialogue and diplomatic principles. Saudi Arabia attaches great importance to the achievements made and will continue constructive dialogue in accordance with the principles established in the agreement. It appreciates the positive role that the People's Republic of China continues to play in this regard.
- China: When answering a reporter’s question, a spokesperson for the Ministry of Foreign Affairs said that the dialogue and agreement reached between Saudi Arabia and Iran set an example for regional countries to resolve conflicts and differences through dialogue and consultation and achieve good neighborliness and friendship. It is conducive to regional countries getting rid of external interference and taking their future and destiny into their own hands.
- Egypt: Ministry of Foreign Affairs stated it hopes the agreement will help ease tensions in the region.
- Maldives: Ministry of Foreign Affairs welcomed the joint statement between China, Saudi Arabia and Iran and announced the restoration of diplomatic relations between the Maldives and Iran.
- United States: President Joe Biden welcomed the re-establishment of diplomatic relations between Saudi Arabia and Iran.
- Yemen: Houthi government's chief negotiator Mohammed Abdulsalam said "the region needs the resumption of normal ties between its countries for the Islamic nation to reclaim its lost security as a result of foreign interference".

=== International organizations ===
- United Nations: UN Secretary-General spokesperson Stephane Dujarric welcomed the agreement, stating that "Good neighborly relations between Iran and Saudi Arabia are essential for the stability of the Gulf region".

=== Political organizations ===
- Hezbollah called the meeting a "good development".

== Aftermath ==
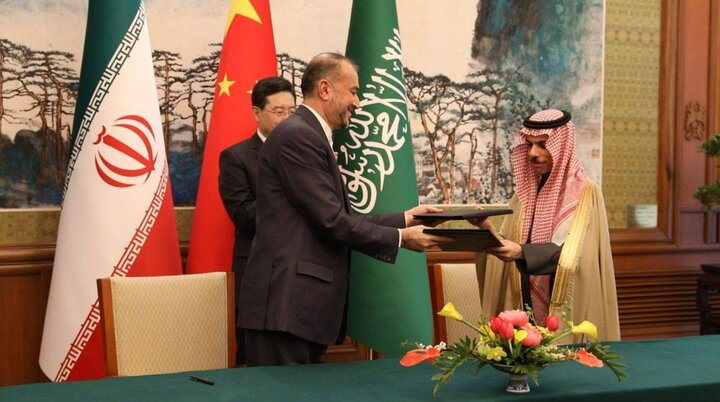
Iranian Foreign Minister Hossein Amir-Abdollahian and Saudi Foreign Minister Faisal bin Farhan Al Saud after signing a joint statement on the restoration of diplomatic relations, with Chinese Foreign Minister Qin Gang in the background, 6 April 2023

On April 6, 2023, Chinese State Councilor and Foreign Minister Qin Gang, Saudi Foreign Minister Faisal bin Farhan Al Saud, and Iranian Foreign Minister Hossein Amir-Abdollahian met in Beijing. On the same day, the foreign ministers of Saudi Arabia and Iran signed a joint statement, announcing the resumption of diplomatic relations between the two countries. The two sides agreed to reopen diplomatic missions within the agreed time and to take necessary measures to open the embassies of the two countries in Riyadh and Tehran, as well as the consulates general in Jeddah and Mashhad. In addition, Saudi Arabia and Iran will continue to conduct necessary coordination between technical delegations to explore ways to expand cooperation between the two countries, including the resumption of official delegations, private sector visits and flights, and to facilitate the mutual issuance of visas between the two countries.

On June 6, 2023, the Iranian Embassy in Saudi Arabia reopened, with Iranian Deputy Foreign Minister Bigdli and Saudi Deputy Foreign Minister Yousef among the officials from both countries in attendance. On June 7, the Iranian Consulate General in Jeddah and the representative office in the Organization of Islamic Cooperation also resumed operations. On June 17, 2023, Saudi Foreign Minister Faisal visited Tehran, the capital of Iran, and met with Iranian Foreign Minister Abdulrahman and President Raisi. This was the first visit by a Saudi foreign minister to Iran since 2006. On August 9, 2023, the Saudi embassy in Iran reopened. On September 6, 2023, Saudi Arabia and Iran exchanged ambassadors. On September 24, 2023, the Maldives restored diplomatic relations with Iran.
