= Dulay Rasheed =

Dulay Rasheed ضليع رشيد
- City
- Dulay Rasheed Center
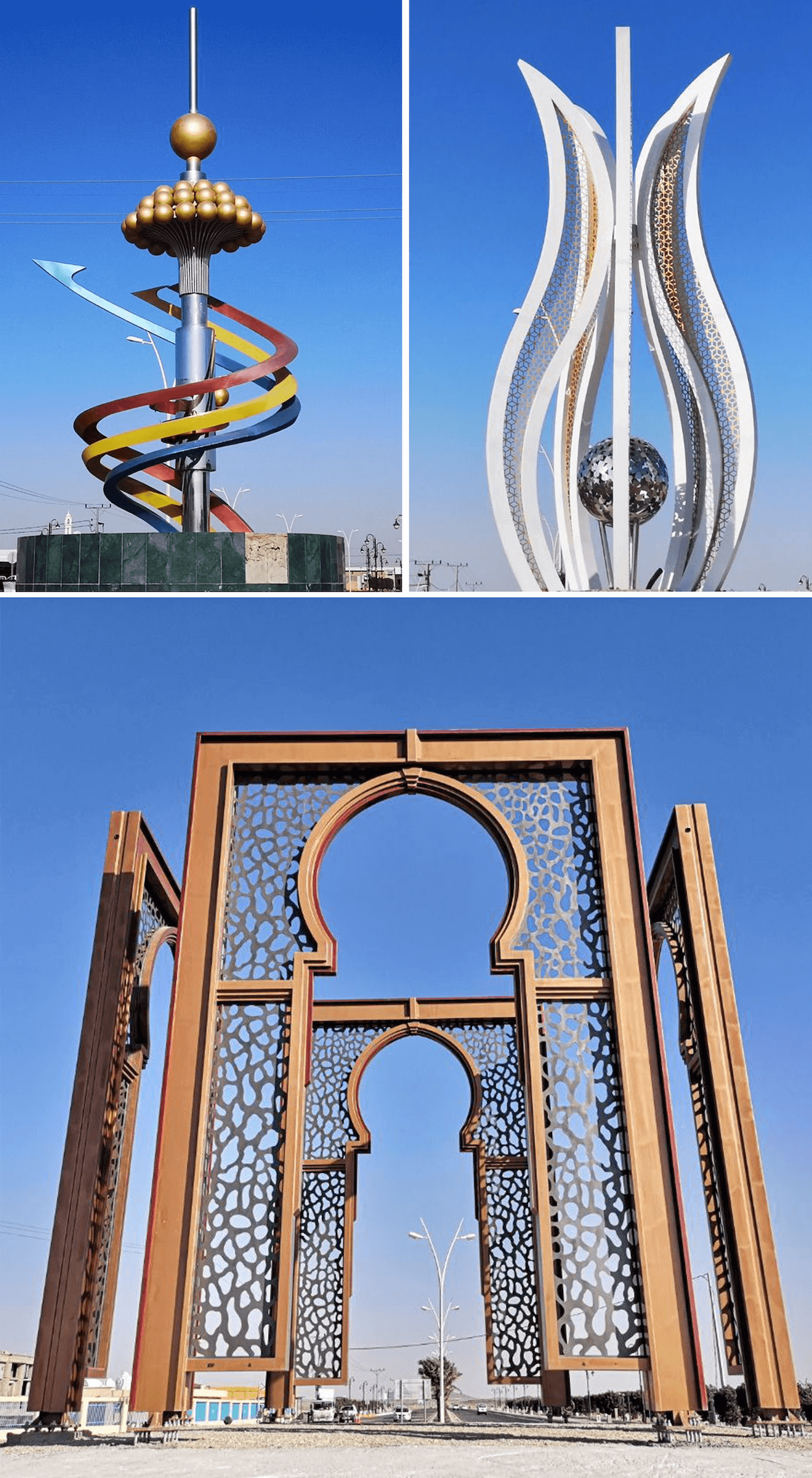
- Dulay Rasheed City Monuments

- Location of Dulay Rasheed within Saudi Arabia Dulay Rasheed (Asia)
- Coordinates: 25°30′24″N 42°51′41″E
- Country: Saudi Arabia
- Region: Al-Qassim Region
- Established: 1929

Area
  - Total: 0.03375 km^{2} (0.01303 sq mi)
- Elevation: 800 m (2,600 ft)

Population (2010)
  - Total: 35,000
- Time zone: UTC+3
- Postal code: 54388
- Area code: +96616

Dulay Rasheed (Arabic: ضليع رشيد) is a city in the center of Saudi Arabia. The city is located in Al-Qassim Region and is about 120 km (75 mi) west of Ar Rass and about 85 km (53 mi) south of Al Nabhaniyah. The city recorded a population of about 35,000 according to the 2010 national census. with a density of about 25 people per km^{2}. The city has many official sub-governorates and villages.

== Geography ==
=== Location ===
Dulay Rasheed is located in the center of Saudi Arabia and is part of Al-Qassim Region. It is located about 120 km (75 mi) west of Ar Rass, about 85 km (53 mi) south of Al Nabhaniyah, and about520 km (320 mi) north-west of Riyadh, the capital of Saudi Arabia. The coordinates of the city are 25°31'27" N and 42°51'48" E in DMS (Degrees Minutes Seconds) or 25.5242 and 42.8633 (in decimal degrees). Its UTM position is KP82 and its Joint Operation Graphics reference is NG38-09.

=== Climate ===
Dulay Rasheed's climate is warm with an average temperature of 27°. The hottest month is August at 36° and the coolest is January at 14°
