= Ibrahim Abdulaziz Al-Assaf =

Former finance Minister of Saudi Arabia

His Excellency Ibrahim Abdulaziz Al-Assaf
- إبراهيم العساف
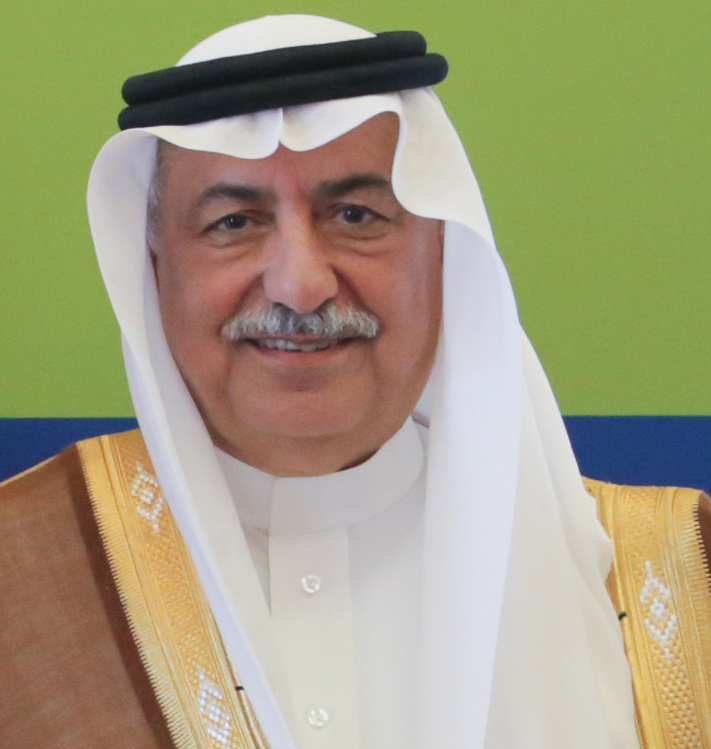
- Al-Assaf in 2016

Minister of Foreign Affairs
- In office 27 December 2018 – 23 October 2019
- Monarch: Salman
- Preceded by: Adel al-Jubeir
- Succeeded by: Faisal bin Farhan Al Saud

Minister of State Minister without portfolio
- In office 2 November 2016 – 27 December 2018
- Monarch: Salman
- Succeeded by: Saleh bin Abdul-Aziz Al ash-Sheikh

Minister of Finance
- In office 30 January 1996 – 31 October 2016
- Monarchs: Fahd; Abdullah; Salman
- Preceded by: Abdulaziz Abdullah Al; Khuwaiter
- Succeeded by: Mohammed Al-Jadaan

Personal details
- Born: 28 January 1949 (age 77) Uyun AlJiwa, Saudi Arabia
- Education: King Saud University; University of Denver; Colorado State University

Ibrahim bin Abdulaziz bin Abdullah Al-Assaf (Arabic: إبراهيم بن عبد العزيز بن عبد الله العساف; born 28 January 1949) is a Saudi politician who served as finance minister, foreign minister, and state minister of Saudi Arabia.

== Early life and education ==
Ibrahim was born in the Qassim Province in central Saudi Arabia on 28 January 1949. He received a Bachelor of Arts degree in economic and political science from King Saud University, Riyadh, in 1971. He later obtained a Master of Arts degree in economics from the University of Denver in 1976 and a PhD in economics from Colorado State University in 1982.

== Career ==
Ibrahim initially pursued an academic career, becoming a teaching assistant and then visiting lecturer at King Abdulaziz Military Academy from 1971 to 1983. He was appointed an assistant professor and head of the Department of Administrative Services in 1982, and served until 1986. During that period, he also served as economic adviser to the Saudi Fund for Development.

After leaving academia, Dr. Al-Assaf moved to Washington, DC where he represented Saudi Arabia at the International Monetary Fund (IMF) and the World Bank. In 1986, he was appointed alternate executive director at the IMF for Saudi Arabia. He left in 1989 to take up the executive directorship for Saudi Arabia at the World Bank.

Upon his return to Saudi Arabia in 1995, he served briefly as vice governor of the Saudi Arabian Monetary Authority, the country's central bank. He left to join the Council of Ministers as minister of state in October 1995. In January 1996, he was appointed minister of finance and national economy, a position that was renamed minister of finance in 2003. He replaced Abdul Aziz Abdullah Al-Khuwaiter as finance minister.

In addition to being finance minister, Ibrahim was a member of the board of directors of Saudi Aramco from 1996 and the chairman of the Saudi Fund for Development and a member of the Public Investment Fund board.

In July 2017, Al-Assaf led the Saudi delegation in the G20 meeting in Hamburg, Germany. In January 2018, he led a top level delegation to the World Economic Forum (WEF) in Davos.

Al-Assaf was named foreign minister of Saudi Arabia in December 2018, replacing Adel al-Jubeir. His tenure ended in October 2019, when Faisal bin Farhan Al Saud was named as the new foreign minister.

== Detention ==
On 4 November 2017, Ibrahim Abdulaziz Al-Assaf was detained in Saudi Arabia in a "corruption crackdown" conducted by a new royal anti-corruption committee. However, the investigation found no evidence of wrongdoing, and he returned to his official duties and his name was cleared.

== Personal life ==
Ibrahim is married and has four children. One of his daughters, Munira, is the spouse of Khalid bin Alwaleed Al Saud.

Political offices
Preceded by Abdulaziz Abdullah Al Khuwaiter	Minister of Finance; 1996–2016	Succeeded by Mohammed Al-Jadaan
Political offices
Preceded by Adel al-Jubeir	Minister of Foreign Affairs; 2018–2019	Succeeded by Faisal bin Farhan Al Saud
Incumbent
