= Qassim building collapse =

- Location of Al-Qassim Region in Saudi Arabia
- Date: 28 April 2015
- Location: Al-Qassim Region, Saudi Arabia
- Deaths: 9
- Injuries: 6 or 7

The Qassim building collapse was a building collapse that left at least 9 Asian (including 8 Pakistanis) construction workers dead and another 6 injured in Al-Qassim Region, Saudi Arabia. The disaster occurred on 28 April 2015.
