= Council of Political and Security Affairs (Saudi Arabia) =

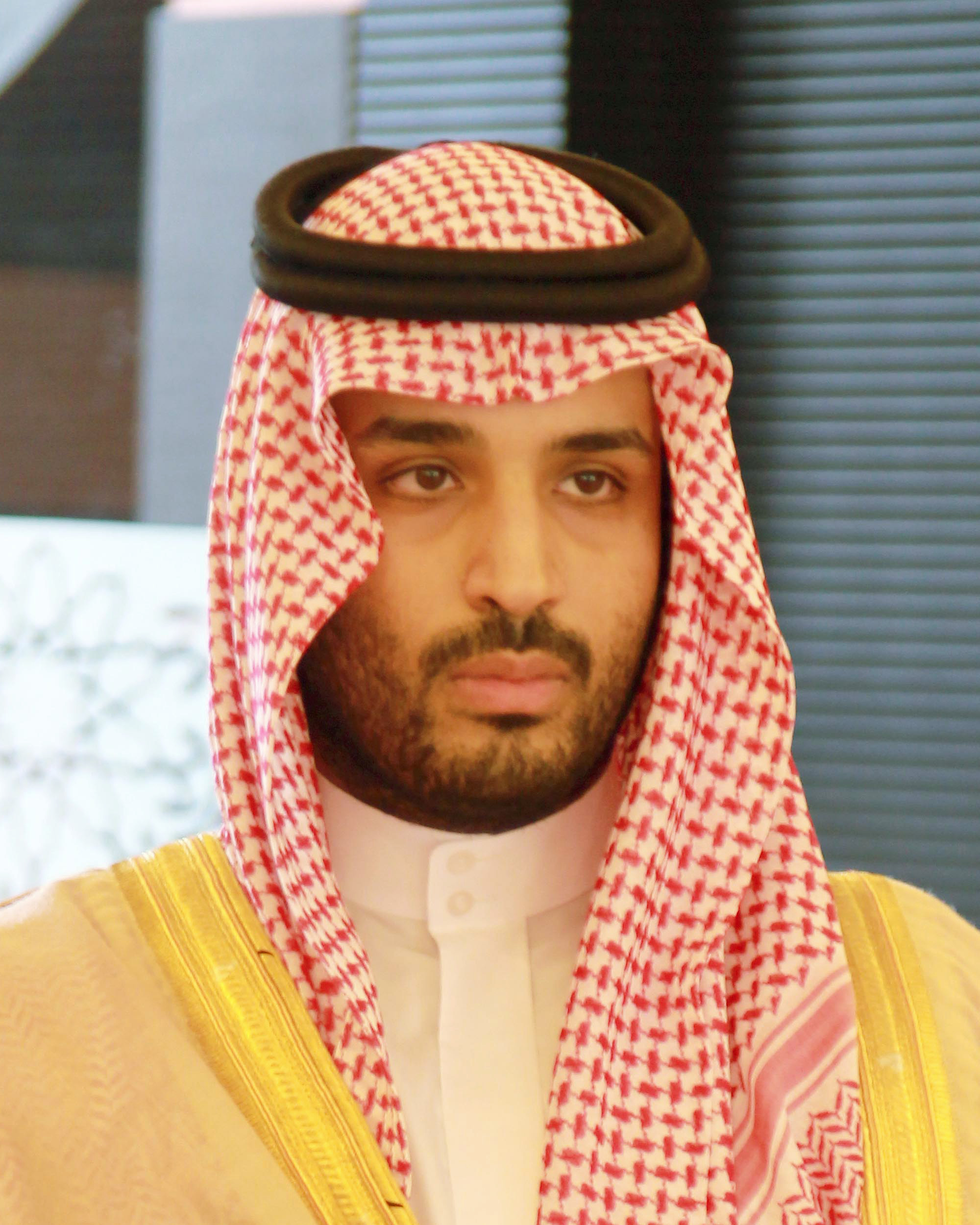
Prince Mohammad Bin Salman Photo

The Council of Political and Security Affairs of Saudi Arabia is one of two subcabinets of the Kingdom of Saudi Arabia, the other being the Council of Economic and Development Affairs. It is led by its Chairman Mohammad bin Salman. The Council is composed of the head of Intelligence and nine ministers. All members of the Council are appointed by royal decree. It was established by King Salman to replace the National Security Council in January 2015.

== History ==
The Council was created to support the policymaking mechanisms of the kingdom. Upon announcing the entity on 29 January 2015, nine ministers were announced as members and the council was chaired by Prince Muhammad bin Nayef. The Council's inaugural meeting was held on 11 February 2015.

The council played an important role in Operation Decisive Storm, part of the military intervention in Yemen.

On June 21, 2017, Prince Muhammad bin Nayef was relieved of all duties by King Salman, and was replaced by Crown Prince Mohammad bin Salman.

== Membership ==
Upon announcing the entity on 29 January 2015, nine ministers were announced as members and the council was chaired by Prince Muhammad bin Nayef. The Council's current membership consists of:

Council of Political and Security Affairs
Mohammad bin Salman	Crown Prince and Prime Minister, President.
Khalid bin Salman	Minister of Defence, Member.
Faisal bin Farhan Al Saud	Minister of Foreign Affairs, Member.
Abdullah bin Bandar bin Abdulaziz Al Saud	Minister of National Guard, Member.
Abd al-Latif bin Abdulaziz Al-Sheikh	Minister of Islamic Affairs, Endowments, Call and Guidance, Member.
Musaad bin Mohammed Al Aiban	Minister of State, Member of the Council of Ministers, Member.
Saad bin Khalid Al Jabry	Minister of State, Member of the Council of Ministers, Member.
Khalid bin Ali bin Abdullah al-Humaidan	Chief of General Intelligence, Member.
