= Antarah ibn Shaddad =

Arabian warrior and poet (525-608)

- عَنْتَرَة بن شَدَّاد
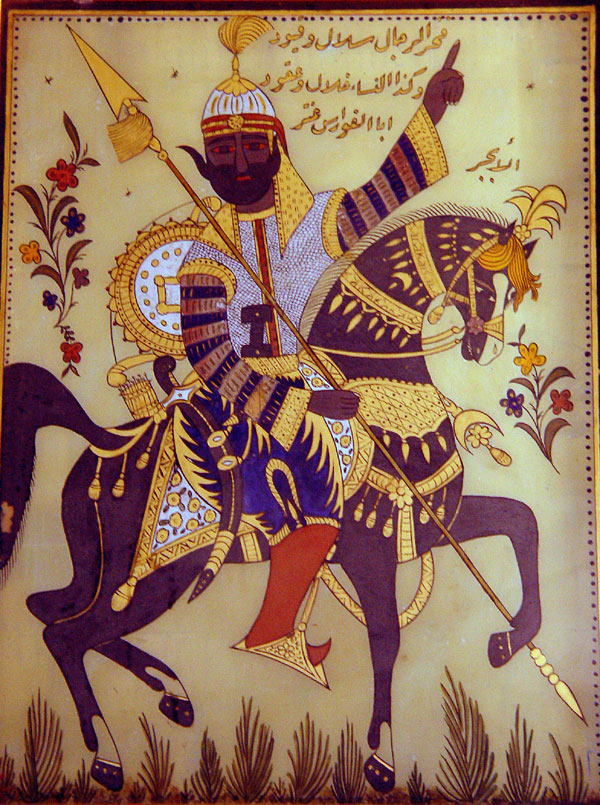
- Born: 525 AD; Qusaiba Al-Qassim Region, Ancient Arabia
- Died: 608 (aged 82–83) AD; Ha'il, Ancient Arabia
- Relatives: Shayboub (Half brother from his mother's side)

Philosophical work
- Era: Pre-Islamic Arabia
- Region: Al Jiwa, Ancient Arabia, Arab world
- Main interests: Arabic poetry

Antarah ibn Shaddad al-Absi (Arabic: عنترة بن شدّاد العبسيّ, romanized: ʿantara ibn šaddād al-ʿabsiyy; 525–608 AD), also known as Antar (عنتر), was a pre-Islamic Arab poet and knight belonging to the Arab tribe of Banu Abs, famous for both his poetry and his adventurous life. His chief poem forms part of the Mu'allaqat, the collection of seven "hanging odes" legendarily said to have been suspended in the Kaaba at Mecca. The account of his life forms the basis of a long and extravagant romance.

== Life ==
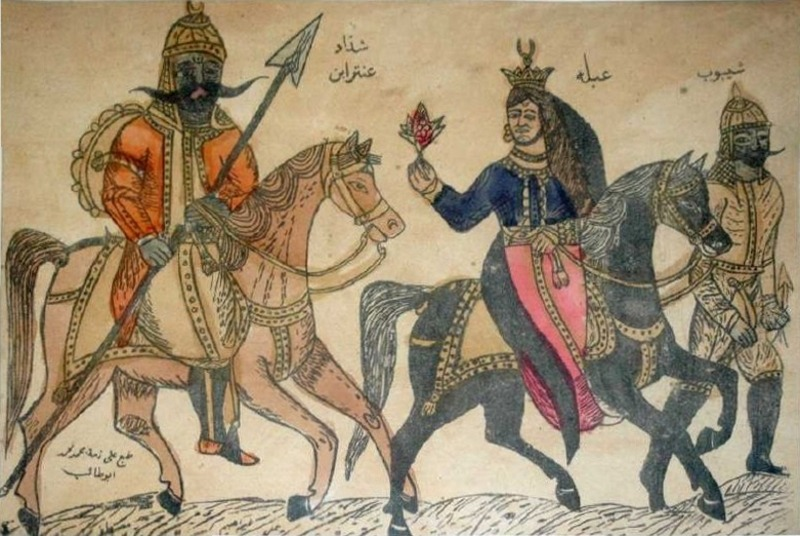
Antarah and Abla depicted on a 19th-century Egyptian tattooing pattern

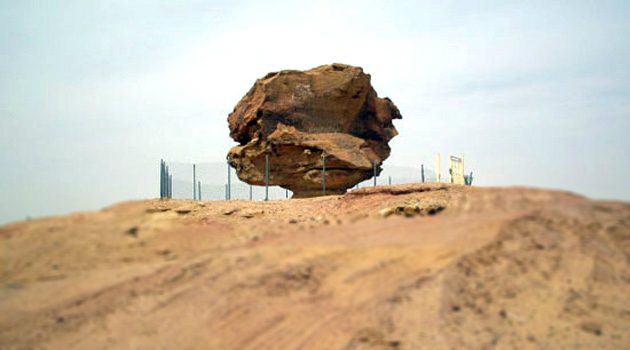
A recent photo of what is said to be the famous rock where Antarah used to meet Abla. Taken in al Jiwa, Saudi Arabia

=== Early life ===
Antarah was born in Najd in the Arabian Peninsula. His father was an Arab, Shaddad al-Absi, a respected warrior of the Banu Abs under their chief Zuhayr. His mother was an Ethiopian woman named Zabibah. Described as one of three "Arab crows" (Aghribah al-'Arab)—famous Arabs with a dark complexion, Antarah grew up a slave as well. He fell in love with his cousin Abla, but could not hope to marry her owing to his position. He also gained the enmity of his father's wife Sumayya. He gained attention and respect for himself by his personal qualities and courage in battle, excelling as an accomplished poet and a mighty warrior.

=== Earning his freedom ===
He earned his freedom after the Tayy tribe invaded the lands of the Banu Abs at the start of the Dahis and al-Ghabra war. When his father said to him, "Antarah, fight with the warriors", he replied "the slave doesn't know how to invade or how to defend, but is only good for milking goats and serving his masters". His father answered him: "Defend your tribe, O Antar, and you are free." So he fought with his tribe and they were able to defeat the attackers.

=== Marrying Abla ===
After defeating the invaders, he sought to gain permission to marry Abla, his cousin for whom he wrote many love poems. To secure permission to marry, Antarah had to face challenges including getting a special kind of camel from the Northern Arab Lakhmid Kingdom, then under al-Nu'man III ibn al-Mundhir.

== Poetry ==
Antarah's poetry is well-preserved and often talks of chivalrous values, courage, and heroism in battle as well as his love for Abla. It was immortalized when one of his poems was included in the Mu'allaqat, the collection of poems legendarily said to have been suspended in the Kaaba. His poetry's historical and cultural importance stems from its detailed descriptions of battles, armour, weapons, horses, desert, and other themes from his time.

Antara's poems are published in Wilhelm Ahlwardt's The Divans of the six ancient Arabic poets (London, 1870); they have also been published separately at Beirut (1888). The Romance of Antar (Sirat Antar ibn Shaddad) is a work which was long handed down by oral tradition only; it has grown to immense proportions and has been published in 32 volumes at Cairo (1889), and in 10 volumes at Beirut, 1871. It was partly translated by Terrick Hamilton under the title Antar, a Bedoueen Romance (4 volumes, London, 1820). In addition, Sirat Antar was translated into Turkish by the order of Sultan Mehmed II in 1477. The translator of the Turkish translation in three volumes is unknown. The manuscript copies of the Turkish translation, known as Qıssa-i Antar, are available in the Topkapı Palace Museum Library.

== Death ==
The time and manner of his death are a matter of dispute. Ibn Duraid has him slain by Wasr ibn Jabir or in battle against the Tayy, while according to Abu Obeida, he died naturally of old age.

== Legacy ==
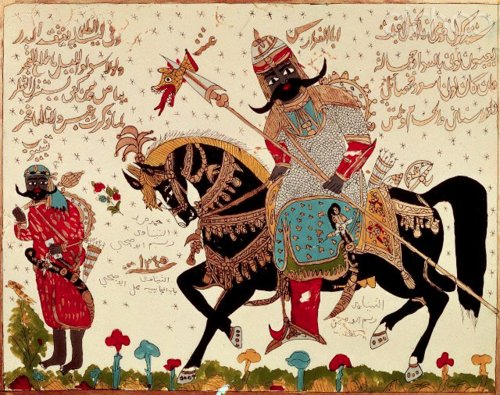
A painting on glass depicting Antarah

The story of Antar and Abla was embroidered into a poetic saga traditionally credited to al-Asma'i, a poet in the court of Harun al-Rashid. It is still recited by traditional storytellers in Arab coffee houses. Its importance has been compared with English literature's Arthurian romances. His house and his stable were particularly legendary. One of the seven clans of Bethlehem is called the Anatreh, named after Antarah. It formerly acted as the guardians of the Church of the Nativity.

In the Folk Epic Sīrat ʿAntar, Antar regularly battles the Crusaders and even helps the Byzantine Emperor fight them off. This anachronism stems from the fact that the Epic took shape during the era of the Crusades, reflecting, among other things, the hope of the people of the Levant and Egypt that a hero would arise to drive out the "infidel Franks" (the Crusaders).

The Russian composer Nikolai Rimsky-Korsakov wrote his Symphony No. 2 based on the legend of Antar. In 1898 the French painter Étienne Dinet published his translation of a 13th-century epic Arab poem Antar, which brought Antar ibn Shaddad to European notice. It has been followed by a number of derivative works such as Diana Richmond's Antar and Abla which furthered western exposure to the Antar bin Shaddad legends. Antar is the title of the first Palestinian opera, composed by the Palestinian musician Mustapha al-Kurd in 1988.

The Lebanese painter Rafic Charaf developed from the 1960s a series of paintings depicting the epics of Antar and Abla. These works that show his interest in the popular folklore of the region are considered a cornerstone in the artist's work.

In the late 1940s the British Lorry Manufacturer Thornycroft began the design of an oilfield tractor to carry pipes for the Anglo-Persian Oil Company which later became the Anglo-Iranian Oil Company. The chosen name for the new Thornycroft tractor, which at the time was one of the largest tractors in the world, was the Thornycroft Mighty Antar. The Antar moniker was chosen with reference to the mighty Warrior Antar.

=== In media ===
Antara's character was depicted many times in TV and movies like the 1961 movie Antar Ben Shaddad starring Farid Shawqi, yet most of these depictions specially older ones face criticism for not hiring Arabs with partially African ancestry or darker Arabs.

== See also ==
- Arabic literature & romance literature
- Banu Abs
- Thornycroft Antar - British pipeline tractor named after his strength and endurance
