= Uyun AlJiwa governorate =

Uyun AlJiwa Uyun AlJiwa Governorate or Al Uyun
- Governorate
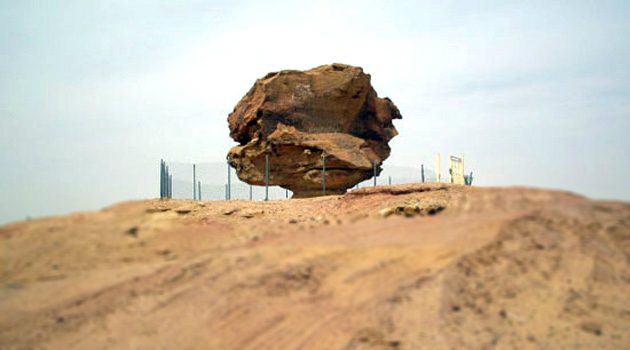
- Sakhrat Antarah historic site

- Flag Coat of arms

- Location within Saudi Arabia
- Coordinates: 26°29′55″N 43°37′56″E
- Country: Saudi Arabia
- Region: Al-Qassim Region

Government
  - المحافظ: محمد بن عبدالله الحجاج
  - Governor: Mohammad bin Abdullah Al-Hajjaj

Area
  - Total: 120 km^{2} (46 sq mi)

Population (2011)
  - Total: 26,544
  - Density: 221.2/km^{2} (573/sq mi)
- Time zone: UTC+3 (AST)
- Area code: 06
- Website: www.OyoonJiwa.com

Uyun AlJiwa (Officially: Uyun AlJiwa Governorate, a.k.a. Al Uyun, Al Jiwa, and Oyoun al Jiwa, Arabic: محافظة عيون الجواء) is a Saudi governorate in northwestern Al-Qassim Region, less than 30 kilometres (19 mi) northwest of Buraydah, the provincial capital city. The name translates to The Valley's Ponds, and it derives from the water ponds which used to surround the area. It is most famous for the past societies which used to live in the area and its ancient historic sites. People of Al Jiwa are distinguished from other people in Al-Qassim Region by their accent.

== History ==
Many historic as well as pre-historic societies have settled in the Al Jiwa land. One example is Banu Abs, who gave birth to the famous knight, adventurer, lover, and poet Antarah ibn Shaddad. Moreover, Al Jiwa contains many Thamudic patterns (e.g. Thamudic petroglyphs). In recent history, many of the region inhabitants' forefathers were among who are called Al Oqilat, which was a group that traveled long distances to trade, work for money, and bring back merchandise. Others were farmers and worked either in harvest or raising livestock. The name of Al Jiwa has been mentioned in both Islamic and Pre-Islamic-era Arabic poetry by poets such as Antarah ibn Shaddad, Zuhayr bin Abi Sulma, Imru' al-Qais, Kumait Ibn Zaid, and Hassan Bin Thabit.

== Geography ==
To distinguish between Al Jiwa and Uyun AlJiwa:

- Al Jiwa' (without "Uyun") translates to "valley" and refers to the valley that contains the governorate
- Uyun AlJiwa refers to both the governorate and the main city

Besides that, the governorate consists of 8 other towns such as Ghaf Al Jiwa (also called Al Ghaf), Rawdh Al Jiwa (also called Ar Rawdh), Authal, and Al Slubiya.

== Archaeological and historic sites ==
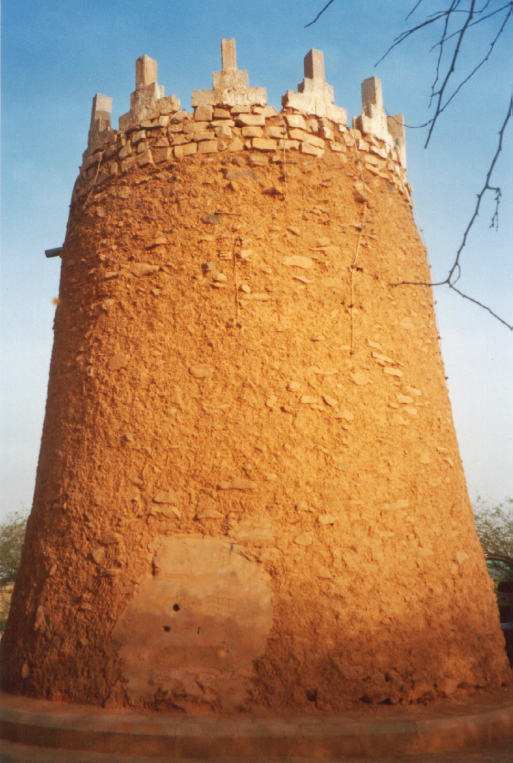
A photo of AlMargab watchtower. Taken in Al Jiwa, Saudi Arabia

Several old and Thamudic rock arts around Al Jiwa area. Some are vertical, some are horizontal, and two are diagonally drawn. They were found mainly in two sites.

- Al-Hanadir lies 15 kilometres (9.3 mi) west of the city. Drawings on two rocks were discovered there.
- Hasat Al-Nusla (also Sakhrat Antarah), a precarious boulder next to a bigger rock formation in northern Ghaf Al Jiwa. The site sustains two historic significations:
  - Historic texts and Thamudic art are engraved on parts of the surface.
  - The legendary meeting place of the Antarah with his love Abla
- AlMargab, an old watchtower built with mud and adobe on the highest plateau in Uyun AlJiwa. It was used to watch for approaching enemies. It was recently reconstructed by Uyun AlJiwa municipality.
- The Old Souq (AlMajles), an old Saudi heritage market, the shops of which form a circle.
- The Old Uyun (Al Uyun AlGidemah), a collection of old mud houses built with adobe, clay, and mud in Uyun AlJiwa. Even though most of them were completely demolished, some of them survived and are preserved as a historic site.
- The trench in northern Authal, it was dug when Banu Hilal tribe lived in the region

== Agriculture ==
Farmers grow and harvest many kinds of vegetable and fruit, such as dates, carrots, okra, and leeks, and they also raise livestock in Al Jiwa. Some bring what they harvest and raise to Souq Al Athnain and Souq Al Jumaa, which are a types of weekly flea market in the region.

== Major facilities ==
- King Fahad Grand Mosque, built in Uyun AlJiwa on a land donated by the Finance Minister of Saudi Arabia, it includes several facilities such as Quran recitation classes, A'tikaf rooms, retail spaces, special rooms for women, and sports and recreational clubs.
- Uyun AlJiwa Hospital covers all the clinically essential needs for the people of the governorate. It also includes a separate renal replacement therapy clinic.
- The Social Cultural Center
- The Public Library, an old library building that was recently renovated
- The Main Yard (Al Hyala)
- AlKatateeb School
- Old farms (Al-Hitan), specialized in palm cultivation.
- Water Wells (Qalban), A group of old wells were used in farms for watering.
- The Stone Of (Alnsalah), the famous Rock where Antarah ibn Shaddad used to meet his lover Abla.

== Notes ==
- The information in this article is based on that in its Arabic equivalent.
