= College of Science Al-Zulfi =

College of Science, Al-Zulfi (Arabic: كلية العلوم بالزلفي) at Almajmaah University was established by a royal decree on 18th of Sha'ban 1426 AH, in Alqaseem in Saudi Arabia. The college includes four departments: The Department of Computer Science, the Department of Mathematics, the Department of Physics and Information, and The department of Medical Laboratories. New students are accepted either in the preparatory year program of laboratory Medicine and computer departments or in the science year preparation for the departments of Mathematics and Physics for one year, as follows:

== The Preparatory Year (First year) ==
The first year is considered a preparatory year for students who want to specialize in the laboratory medicine, or computer science and information departments. The first year aims to prepare the students to receive the academic education highly, the skills of English Language, and train the students on the thinking and learning skills.

== The Program of Natural Science Preparation (Second year) ==
The second year is considered a preparatory year for students who want to specialize in the Physics or Mathematics departments. The program aims to prepare the students to receive the academic education highly, train the students on teaching methodologies and acquire the skills of thinking and learning.

== Academic departments ==
- Computer Science
- Mathematics
- Physics
- Medical laboratories
