= Al Nabhaniyah =

Al Nabhaniyah محافظة النبهانية
- Governorate
- Country: Saudi Arabia
- Region: Al-Qassim Region

Population (2016)
  - Total: 46,429
- Time zone: UTC+3 (EAT)
  - Summer (DST): UTC+3 (EAT)

Al Nabhaniyah (Arabic: النبهانية) is one of the governorates in Al-Qassim Region, Saudi Arabia.
