= Faisal bin Farhan Al Saud =

Saudi foreign minister

His Highness Faisal bin Farhan Al Saud
- فيصل بن فرحان آل سعود
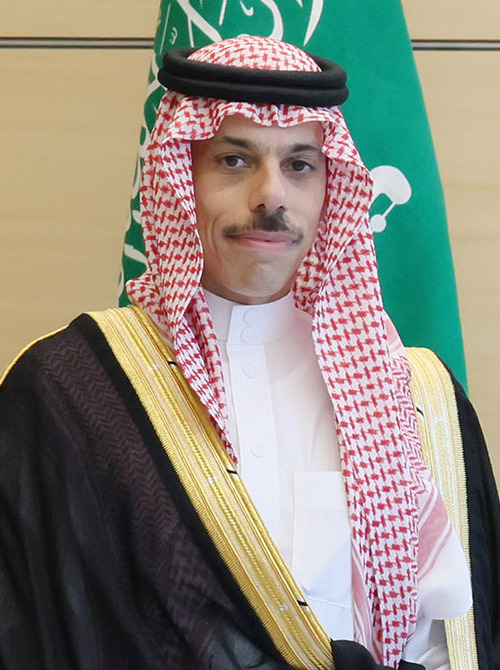
- Faisal in 2022

Minister of Foreign Affairs
- Incumbent
- Assumed office 23 October 2019
- Monarch: Salman
- Prime Minister: Salman (2019–2022); Mohammed bin Salman (2022–present)
- Preceded by: Ibrahim Abdulaziz Al-Assaf

Ambassador of Saudi Arabia to Germany
- In office 27 March 2019 – October 2019
- Monarch: Salman
- Preceded by: Khalid bin Bandar bin Sultan Al Saud
- Succeeded by: Essam Ibrahim Baitalmal

Personal details
- Born: 1 November 1974 (age 51) Frankfurt, West Germany
- Relatives: House of Saud
- Education: King Saud University

Prince Faisal bin Farhan bin Abdullah bin Faisal bin Farhan Al Saud (Arabic: فيصل بن فرحان آل سعود, DMG Faiṣal b. Farḥān Āl Saʿūd; born 1 November 1974) is a Saudi Arabian diplomat and politician who has been serving as the foreign minister of Saudi Arabia since 2019. Prince Faisal has also served as the Saudi ambassador to Germany from 27 March 2019 until his appointment as foreign minister by a royal decree issued by King Salman. Prince Faisal was born in Frankfurt, West Germany and spent a part of his childhood and young adulthood in that country, which is why he speaks fluent German according to German news media.

== Early life and political career ==
Prince Faisal's lineage is traced back to the Al Saud family from the branch of Farhan bin Saud, the brother of Muhammad bin Saud, the founder of the First Saudi State. A son of Prince Farhan bin Abdullah Al Saud, he was born on 1 November 1974 in West Germany and was educated in the US. He studied business administration at King Saud University. He served as an adviser at the Saudi Arabian Embassy in the US from 2017 to 2019.

Faisal has held senior positions in Saudi and international companies, primarily the aerospace and weapons sector. He was, until at least his appointment as ambassador to Germany, a director of the arms company Saudi Arabian Military Industries (SAMI). He then worked for the Saudi ambassador to the United States.

As an expert on the defense industry, he also chaired a US-Saudi joint venture with the aerospace company Boeing. Prince Faisal also served as an adviser to the Royal Court of Saudi Arabia.

In November 2017, Saudi Arabia withdrew its then ambassador to Germany, Khalid bin Bandar bin Sultan Al Saud, in protest of a statement made by Sigmar Gabriel, the German Foreign Minister at that time. Gabriel had clearly criticized the active influence of the kingdom on the political-power constellation in Lebanon. After nearly a year of diplomatic crisis and vacancy of the ambassador position, Saudi Arabia sent its ambassador back to Berlin, but he was replaced by Faisal bin Farhan on 27 March 2019. Saudi dissidents living in Germany were not pleased with the appointment of Faisal. The dissident Khalid bin Farhan al-Saud, a distant relative of the new ambassador, feared that the diplomat could also pressure opposition representatives. He told Deutsche Welle that he did not rule out that Faisal bin Farhan had been sent to Germany to persecute Saudi dissidents living in the country. Faisal has a good relationship with the kingdom's powerful crown prince, Mohammed bin Salman.

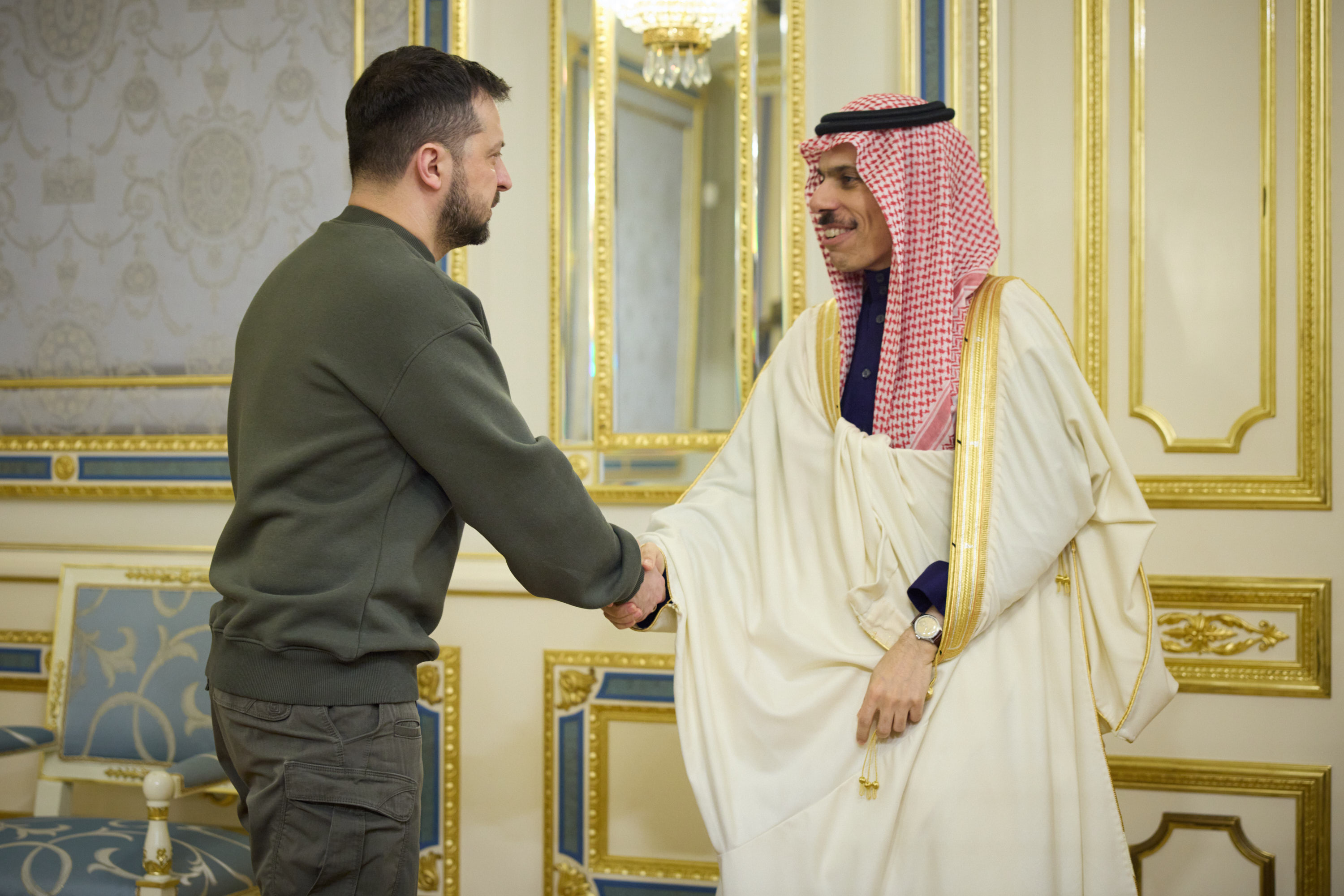
Faisal with Ukrainian President Volodymyr Zelenskyy in Kyiv on 26 February 2023

On 23 October 2019, he was appointed as Minister of Foreign Affairs of Saudi Arabia.

On 19 August 2020, Foreign Minister Faisal said the peace agreement between Israel and the United Arab Emirates could be seen as positive, but Saudi Arabia would not normalize relations until peace is signed with the Palestinians, hopefully within the framework of the Arab Peace Initiative.

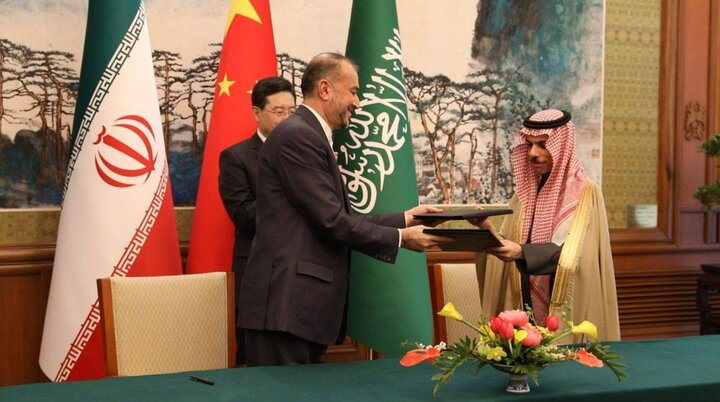
Faisal and Iranian Foreign Minister Hossein Amir-Abdollahian after signing a joint statement on the restoration of diplomatic relations, with Chinese Foreign Minister Qin Gang in the background, 6 April 2023

Since April 2021, Iraq has hosted five rounds of direct talks between Saudi Arabia and Iran, which cut diplomatic ties in 2016. The 6th round of talks on a ministerial level stalled, but after a meeting in Amman, Jordan, in December 2022, Faisal and Iran's Foreign Minister Hossein Amir-Abdollahian signaled that both countries would be "open to more dialogue". In January 2023, Faisal speaking at a panel at the World Economic Forum in Davos reiterated that "Riyadh is trying to find a dialog with Iran". The two countries announced the resumption of relations on 10 March 2023, following a deal brokered by China. It could lead the way to easing of the Iran–Saudi Arabia proxy conflict, thus bringing stability to Yemen, Syria, Iraq, Lebanon and Bahrain.

In June 2023, Faisal took part in a BRICS Foreign Ministers Meeting in Cape Town chaired by South Africa. He met with Russian Foreign Minister Sergey Lavrov, who was also in Cape Town.

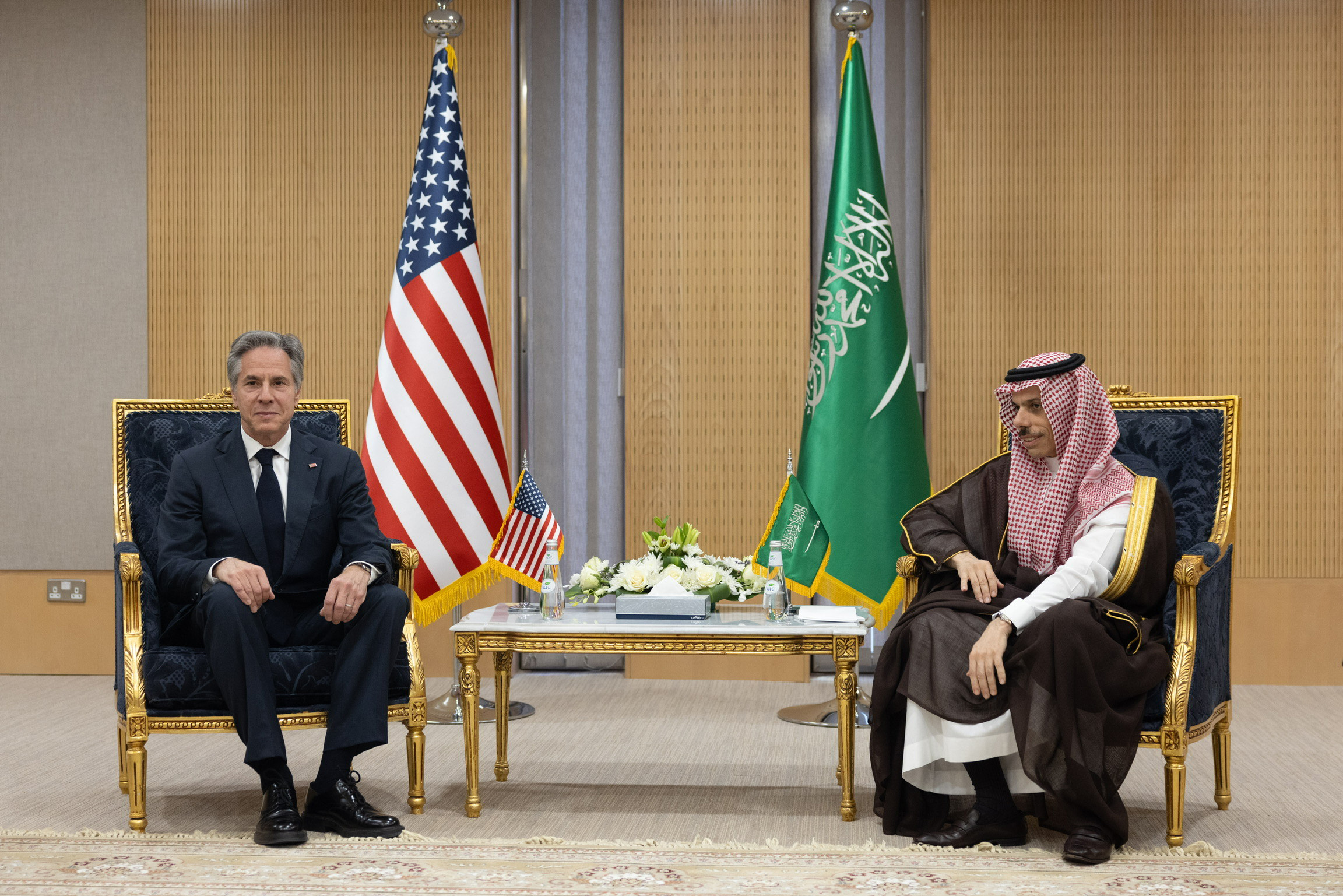
Faisal with US Secretary of State Antony Blinken in Riyadh, Saudi Arabia, 29 April 2024

In January 2024, Faisal said that normalization between Israel and Saudi Arabia would not be possible without resolving the Israeli–Palestinian conflict.

In June 2024, he attended the Ukraine peace summit in Switzerland. Faisal said serious negotiations "will require difficult compromises as part of a roadmap that leads to peace. And here, it is essential to emphasise that any credible process will need Russia’s participation."

In July 2024, speaking at the European Council on Foreign Relations, Faisal called on European countries to impose sanctions on Israel for alleged war crimes committed during Israel's military operations in Gaza.

In February 2025, Prince Faisal bin Farhan Al Saud participated with National Security Adviser Musaad bin Mohammed Al Aiban to the February 2025 United States–Russia summit in Saudi Arabia. At the request of Saudi Arabian Foreign Minister Faisal bin Farhan Al Saud, Wang Yi, Member of the Political Bureau of the CPC Central Committee and China's Foreign Minister, met with him in Johannesburg on 20 February 2025.

== See also ==
- Council of Ministers of Saudi Arabia

Diplomatic posts
Preceded by Khalid bin Bandar bin Sultan Al Saud	Saudi ambassador to Germany; 2019	Succeeded by Essam Ibrahim Baitalmal
Political offices
Preceded by Ibrahim Abdulaziz Al-Assaf	Minister of Foreign Affairs; 2019–present	Incumbent
