= Musaad bin Mohammed Al Aiban =

Saudi Arabian government minister

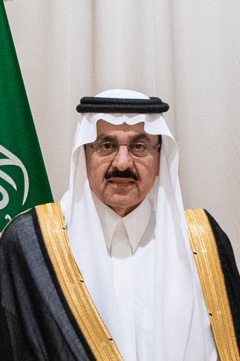
Al Aiban in 2025

Musaid Al Aiban (Arabic: مساعد بن محمد العيبان) is the National Security adviser, Minister of State and member of the Council of Ministers of Saudi Arabia. He serves in both the Saudi Council of Political and Security Affairs (CPSA), and the Council of Economic and Development Affairs (CEDA).

== Early life ==
Musaid is the son of Muhammad Al-Aiban, the first head of the Saudi General Intelligence Presidency, and the brother of Bandar Al-Aiban, once head of the Saudi Human Rights Commission.

After studying at King Saud University, he attended Harvard University to study law.

== Career ==
Al Aiban was a consultant across the Saudi government before landing at the Ministry of Industry and Mineral Resources, and eventually becoming an advisor to the Royal Court of Saudi Arabia. He was appointed to the Council of Ministers of Saudi Arabia in 1995.

One of the oldest members of the Council of Ministers, Al Aiban traditionally has not held a specific ministerial portfolio since his appointment. He served as a trusted envoy of several Saudi sovereigns, including King Fahd and King Abdullah.

In February 2025, he participated with Prince Faisal bin Farhan Al Saud to the February 2025 United States–Russia summit in Saudi Arabia.
