= Al-Qassim Province =

Province of Saudi Arabia

Al-Qassim Province منطقة القصيم
- Province
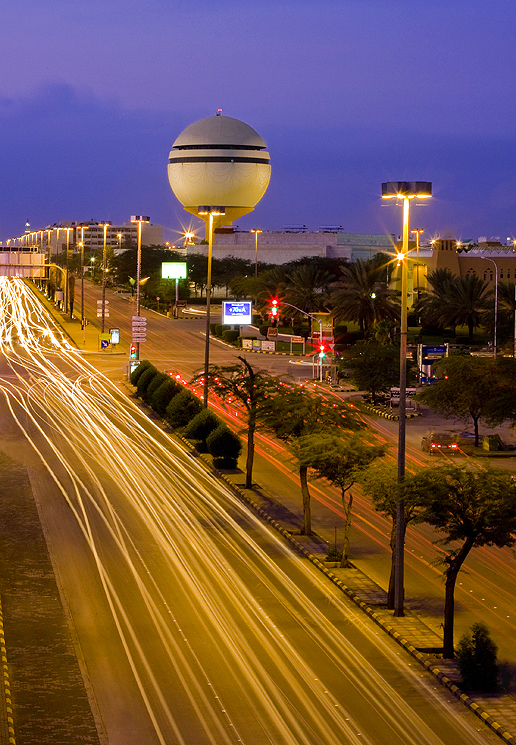
- A view of the provincial seat, Buraydah, at night

- Map of Saudi Arabia with Al-Qassim Province highlighted
- Coordinates: 26°21′41″N 43°57′57″E
- Country: Saudi Arabia
- Region: Najd
- Seat: Buraydah
- Governorates: 12

Government
  - Governor: Faisal bin Mishaal

Area
  - Total: 58,046 km^{2} (22,412 sq mi)

Population (2024 census)
  - Total: 1,336,179
  - Density: 23.019/km^{2} (59.620/sq mi)
- Time zone: UTC+03:00 (SAST)
- Area code: 016
- ISO 3166 code: SA-05

Al-Qassim Province, (Note: Arabic: منطقة القصيم, romanized: Minṭaqat al-Qaṣīm; also known as the Qassim Region.) is a province in central Saudi Arabia, located at the heart of the country near the geographic center of the Arabian Peninsula. Its administrative seat is Buraydah, the largest city in the province. With a population of 1,336,179 in 2024, it spans an area of 58,046 km^{2}. It is widely considered one of the breadbaskets of the Kingdom due to its extensive agricultural tradition and resources.

== Etymology ==
The name Al Qassim, also spelled Al Gassim, is derived from the Arabic word qassimah (قصيمة), a term denoting "sand dunes". The region is known for its numerous sand dunes, where the white saxaul (ghada) tree commonly grows.

== Location ==
The province is located in the center of Saudi Arabia approximately 400 km (250 mi) northwest of Riyadh, the capital. It is bordered by Riyadh Region to the south and east, by Ha'il Region to the north, and by Al Madinah Region to the west. The region is connected to almost every part of Saudi Arabia by a very complicated network of highways. The regional airport, Prince Nayef bin Abdulaziz Regional Airport, connects Al Qassim (Gassim) to the other provinces of the country.

== History ==
=== Pre-Islamic Arabia ===
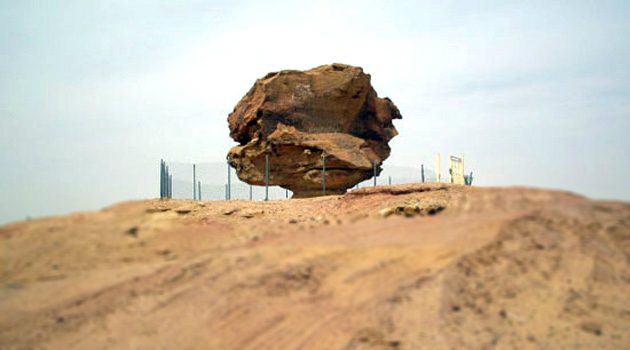
A current photo of, what is said to be, Antarah's Rock in AlJiwa

There isn't much information known about Al Qassim the province in the times of Pre-Islamic Arabia. Unaizah was repeatedly mentioned as a desert watering hole in the poems of Imru Al Qais (the famous Arabian poet). Moreover, AlJiwa, which is about 60 km north of Unaizah, was mentioned by the heroic Absi poet Antarah bin Shaddad.

=== The Abbasid era ===
Al Qassim Province had some important foyers on the road of pilgrims and traders coming from the east (mainly Persia and Iraq) in the era of the Abbasid Empire.

The Zubeida road was a long pilgrims road that started from the city of Kufa in Iraq and ran to Mecca in Arabia. The road was constructed in the reign of Harun Al-Rashid and was named after his wife Zubaidah. It had pilgrims foyers in many of the region's cities including Unaizah.

=== Tribal conflict (1600s–1907) ===
The Al Abu Olayan - dynasty from the Banu Tamim tribe established the emirate of Buraydah in the late 16th century by its leader, Rashid Al Duraiby. He built Buraydah and made it the province's capital. However, Unaizah was ruled by Al Sulaim dynasty from the Subay tribe. The emirate of Buraydah was later captured by Muhanna bin Salih bin Hussein Abaalkhail from the Anazzah tribe. In 1890, the Rashidi dynasty based in Ha'il annexed the province. In 1904, the Abaalkhail recaptured the province. In 1907, the province was integrated under the Kingdom of Saudi Arabia.

=== Al Aqilat era (late 1850 and early 1900) ===
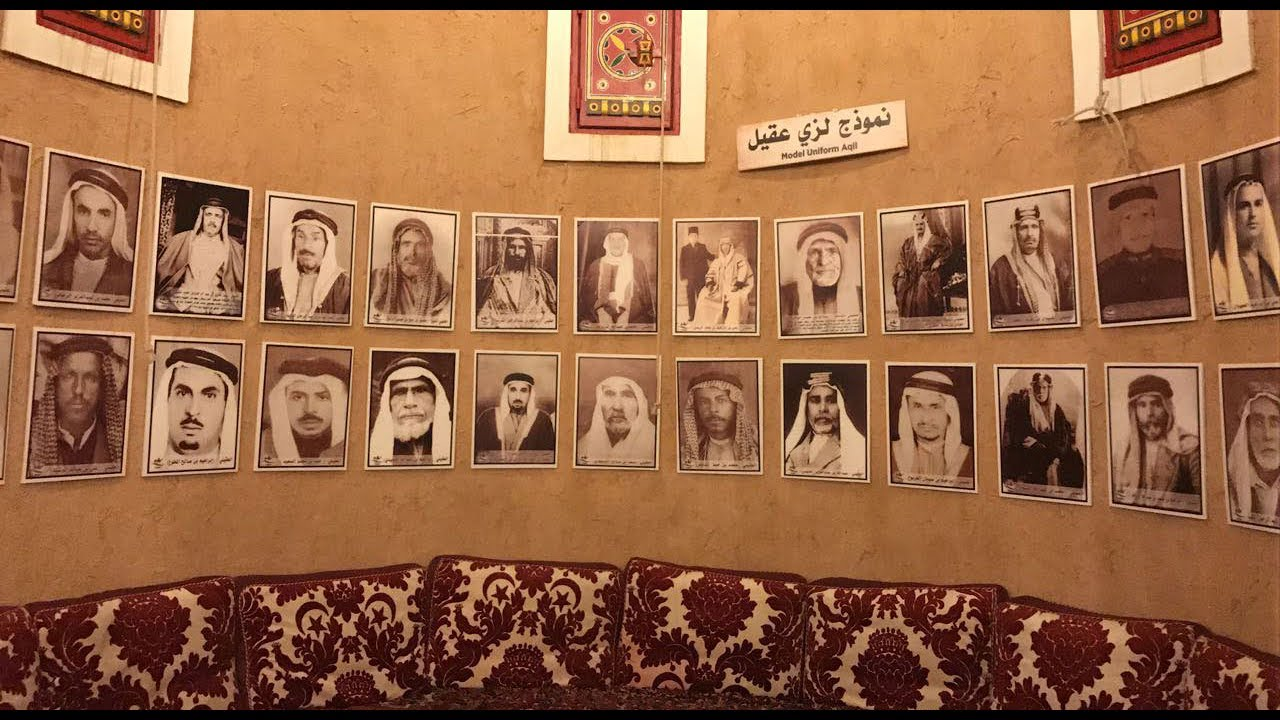

They represent a settled tribes and families from Najd, specifically from Al Qassim in Saudi Arabia. Among most important families of the Aqilat are “Aba Alkhail, Al Rumaih, Al Arfaj, Al Sugair, Al Rebdi, Al Fuzan Alsabig, Al Jarbou, Al Otaishan, Al Rawaf, Al Bati, Al Musalam, Al Sharidah, Al Assaf and Al Tuwajiri”. They were famous for trading primarily gold, horses especially Arabian horses, camels, clothing and food from across Arabian Peninsula. They traded in Kuwait, Iraq, Sham "now known Jordan, Syria" and others. This nickname was unique because of their distinctiveness in wearing the Aqal and their unique uniforms from the rest of the people. they were deeply known around the people of the Arabian Peninsula and the Arab world for their courage, generosity, honesty and patience over the hardships of distant travels, as they had a great impact in flourishing of economics and business around the region. They have known as they are heroes of Arabian region as they were first ambassador of His Majesty King Abdul Aziz. As the custodian of the Two Holy Mosques, King Abdullah Bin Abdulaziz, said that Al Aqilat are the best and first ambassadors to the Arabian nations in Kingdom of Saudi Arabia. Moreover, Crown Prince Sultan bin Abdul Aziz praised the men of Al Aqilat, as he said that they were the first to bring trade to the Kingdom of Saudi Arabia.

=== Saudi Arabia ===
It is the heart of the Najd region and the centre of the Salafi movement. The province is regarded as one of the key support bases of the Al Saud family, along with Al Riyadh Province, Ha'il province and Al Jawf province. This province has also contributed many notable Salafi ulema and sheikhs.

== Archaeology ==
In 2026, archaeologists excavating the ancient settlement of Dariyah uncovered a ceramic vessel containing more than 100 gold ornaments, along with silver artifacts and gemstone-decorated jewelry dating to the Abbasid period (8th–9th centuries CE). The assemblage included pendants, decorated discs, beads, and gold spacers bearing floral and geometric motifs produced with metalworking techniques such as hammering and stone inlay. Excavations also revealed architectural remains including stone foundations, mudbrick walls, hearths, pottery, and metal tools. Researchers associated the settlement with the historic Basran Hajj route, a major pilgrimage and trade corridor linking Iraq with Mecca, and suggested that the hoard may have belonged to a traveler or pilgrim moving along this route.

== Population ==
Year	Population
1992	768,469
2004	1,015,972
2010	1,204,531
2022	1,336,179

== Geography ==
Al Qassim province is divided by the Wadi Al-Rummah (Rummah Valley). The valley crosses the entire region from the west to the northeast. It is the longest valley in the whole Arabian Peninsula, it stretches for about 600 km (370 mi) from near Medina, to the Thuayrat Dunes in the east, and northeast of the region. The land's height in Qassim is about 600–750 meters above sea level, and it glides from west to east in general.

=== Climate ===
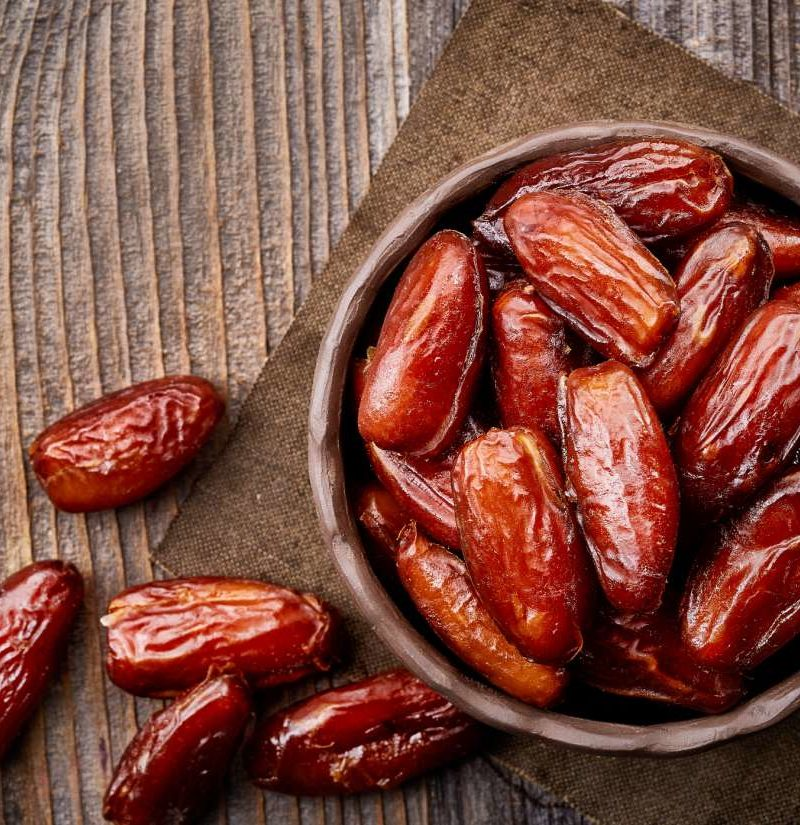

Al Qassim region has a typical desert climate, known for its cool, rainy winters and for its hot, less humid summers.

== List of Governorates ==
Name	Arab	Area km^{2}	Population Census 2022-05-10
Al-'Asyāḥ	الاسياح	3,317.87	35,533
Al Badayea	البدائع	1,294	53,779
Al Bukayriyah	البكيرية	3,162	63,551
Al Mithnab	المذنب	1,942	43,278
Al Nabhaniyah	النبهانية	6,886	46,558
Ar Rass	الرس	2,651	121,359
Al Shimasiyah	الشماسية	2,812	7,818
Buraydah	بريدة	15,060	677,647
Dariyah	ضريه	6,994	20,826
Riyadh Al Khabra	رياض الخبراء	1,707	31,203
Unaizah	عنيزة	1,900	184,644
Uqalt aṣ-Ṣuqūr	عقلة الصقور	8,580	20,805
Uyun AlJiwa	عيون الجواء	3,346	29,178

== Agriculture ==
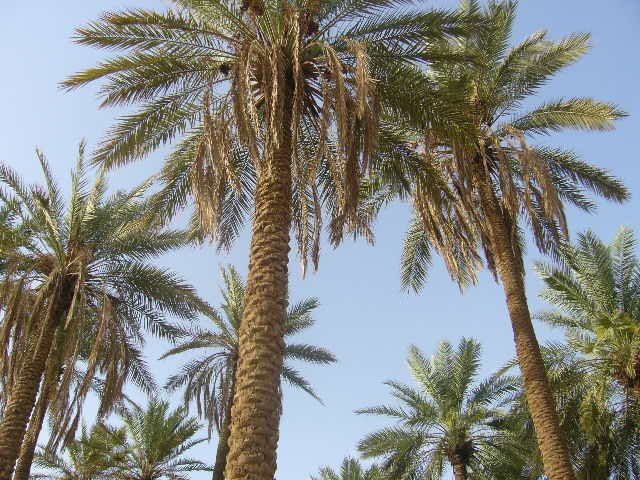
Palm trees in Unaizah

Al-Qassim region hosts more than eight million palm trees, making it one of the Middle East’s largest producers of dates, producing an annual amount of 205 thousand tons of various types of luxury dates, which gives the region a high economic value by exporting large amounts of dates nationally and internationally, especially in the GCC region. Multiple cities in the region market their dates production with dates festivals that mostly start in September, although Buraydah (the capital of the province) hosts the largest festival in the world, at which a lot of people come from all over the World to buy their yearly requirement of dates.

Along with tourism, agriculture is still the cornerstone of the region's economy. Although the region has been known for its agricultural assets for a long time, it wasn't until recently that wheat production has been introduced to the local agricultural industry, making Saudi Arabia a net exporter of cereal. The region also produces dates, grapes, lemons, grapefruits, mandarin oranges, oranges, pomegranates, and a large group of vegetables. The region also hosts one of the biggest camel market in the world, due to its central location, surrounded by Aldahna and alnfound deserts.

Agriculture in general is considered to be a very important part of the region's natives culture, with special vegetables being linked to every city, for example eating leeks (kurrat) is associated with the people of Unaizah, while adding chili peppers to meals is associated with the people of the city of Rass.

== Transportation ==
=== Air ===
- Prince Nayef bin Abdulaziz Regional Airport (IATA: ELQ, ICAO: OEGS), The airport is an International airport, serving destinations to GCC, Egypt and Turkey. Formerly Qassim Regional Airport and widely known in the air-travel industry as "Gassim" (from Al-Qassim Province). The airport was established in 1964 and it is owned and operated by the General Authority of Civil Aviation (GACA). The airport is in the city of Al-Mulieda, which is 30 km West of Buraidah and 40 km North West of Unaizah. According to (GACA), the number of travelers has increased from 595,170 travelers in 2011 to 1,150,000 travelers in 2014.

=== Rail transport ===
The North South Railway Line is a 2,750 kilometres (1,709 mi) railway line, built by Saudi Railway Company (SAR) in Saudi Arabia. Operation on 1,392 kilometres (865 mi) long Connecting Al Jawf Region, Northern Borders Region, Ha'il Region, Al-Qassim Region, Riyadh Region .

Al Qassim Railway Station located at East Buraydah 10 km at King Fahad Road.

Station facilities : ATM, Business Lounge, Baggage trolleys, Cafes, Customer Service, Lost property, Mosque, Prayer room, Restaurants, Seated area, Shops, Car parking, Baby change, Toilets and Wi-Fi.

Timetable : 9 July – 23 September 2017

Riyadh to Qassim (Sun, Mon, Tue, Wed, Fri) from 10:00 To 12:26 passing Majmaah Station . Riyadh to Qassim (Thu, Sat) from 17:30 To 20:00 passing Majmaah Station .

Qassim to Riyadh (Sun, Mon, Tue, Wed, Fri) from 17:45 To 20:16 passing Majmaah Station . Qassim to Riyadh (Thu, Sat) from 21:00 To 23:26 passing Majmaah Station .

== Education ==
=== Schools ===
The region is served by schools in every city and town for all three educational levels (primary, intermediate, and secondary), and includes various types of school (public, private, Koranic, international), with international and private schools.

The region has 263,379 Female and Male Students, 33,061 Female & Male Teachers and 2,533 Schools.

=== Colleges ===
- College of Science Al-Zulfi

=== Universities ===
Main building of Qassim university, January 2024

Qassim University was established in 2004 by merging two Qassim branches of Imam Mohammad Ibn Saud Islamic University and King Saud University. Since the establishment of the university, it has experienced a growth in enrollment and a significant expansion of faculty and its administrative staff. The number of male and female students registered at university during 2010-11 approached 50,000 and number of faculty members and staff reached well over 4,000, At present the university encompasses 28 colleges both for male and female students.

=== Technical and Vocational Training Corporation ===
- As part of the new TVET paradigm for Technical & Vocational Education in the Kingdom of Saudi Arabia Qassim has a number of technical colleges which are operated by International Training Providers (ITP's) and these are located in Unaizah, Ar Rass and Buraydah. Hertfordshire London Colleges operate the male and female colleges in Unaizah and they provide a foundation year where students learn to communicate and understand English and IT being taught by Native English speakers from the United Kingdom. The second and third years enables students to specialize in a wide range of technical & vocational subjects which include Automotive, Electronics, Mechatronics, Manufacturing, Business, IT and Retail leading to a diploma qualification. Students will also be allowed to continue their studies to achieve a Degree qualification whilst they are working.
- The Technical and Vocational Training Corporation has colleges located in Buraidah, Onizah, Ar Rass and Al Badayea. Colleges prepare and train students to be skilled and ready for employment in different sectors (industrial, agricultural, commercial and public services), with a focus on fields of science and technology and offers different specialization's in computer science, electronics, welding, electricity, mechanics, refrigeration and air conditioning, motor vehicles, chemistry, technical and administrative, communications, space management, plumbing, carpentry, photography, marketing, architectural construction, printing, plumbing and paint.
- Colleges of Excellence, the international subsidiary of TVTC has opened a new government sponsored college in Buraydah. The College is a vocational college focusing in Business, Technology and Electronics as majors and career fields.

=== Private colleges ===
- Qassim Private Colleges
- Al-Ghad International Medical Sciences Colleges
- Buraydah Colleges
- Sulaiman Alrajhi Colleges
- Unaizah Colleges

== Sports ==
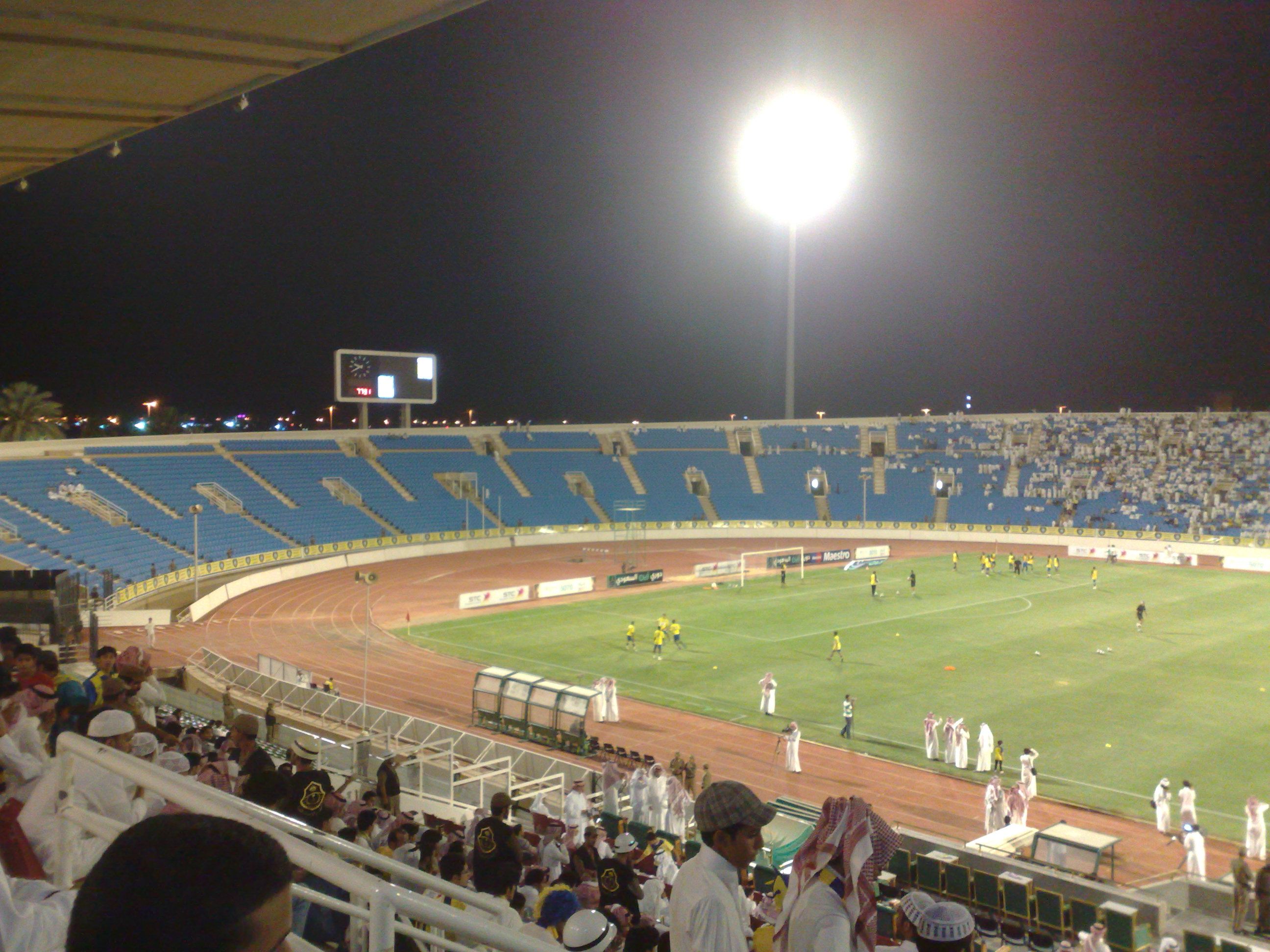
King Abdullah Sport City Stadium in Buraidah

- King Abdullah Sport City Stadium is the major stadium in Al-Qassim Region, located in the capital city of Buraidah. The stadium capacity is 25,000 and it hosts different sport and entertainment events. It is also the home ground for Al-Raed and Al-Taawon FC.
- Al-Raed is the first sport club established in Al-Qassim Region and the 12'th club in Saudi Arabia, established in 1954. Al-Raed is currently playing in the Saudi First Division League, which is the second tier of the Saudi football league system.
- Al-Taawon FC is the second sport club established in Al-Qassim Region and the 14th in Saudi Arabia, established in 1956. Al-Taawon FC is first team from AL-Qassim to play in the AFC champions league, which is the highest football competition in Asia, their first appearance is in the 2017 version. They are also currently playing in the Saudi Professional League, which is the highest football competition in the country.
- Many clubs from Al-Qassim have made good results in the first league, the clubs that have played in the Saudi Professional League or previously the (First League) are: Al-Raed, Al-Taoun, Al-Najmah, Al-Arabi and Al-Hazem.
- The following is a list of all clubs in Al-Qassim region.

Club Name	City	Established
Al-Raed	Buraidah	1954
Al-Taawon FC	Buraidah	1956
Al-Arabi	Onaizah	1958
Al-Hazem	Ar Rass	1958
Al-Najmah	Onaizah	1960
Al-Taqadum	Al-Muthnib	1961
Al-Bukairiyah (Al-Amal)	Al-Bukairiyah	1962
Al-Badayea (Al-Rumah)	Al-Badayea	1965
Al-Kholoud	Ar Rass	1970
Al-Jawa	Riyadh Al-Khbra	1975
Al-Hilaliah	Al-Hilaliah	1976
Mared	Asyah	1979
Al-Mooj	Al-Khbra	1982
Al-Saqer	Al-Buser	1984
Al-Hessan	Al-Quwarah	2014

=== Tourism ===
According to the Saudi Commission for Tourism and National Heritage (SCTH), Al-Qassim has been recognized as the number one province in the Kingdom in organizing festivals and events, with an annual number of 173 events in 2014. Al-Qassim Province is rich in heritage, nature, and traditional handicrafts, and its geographical location makes it the hub of diverse cultures and various festivals. Each season in Qassim has a certain festival and a specific occasion that highlights the prominent features of that season. During summer vacation, for nearly a month, various events and festivals are organized in Qassim and its governorates and are held in the markets, museums, public parks, and other locations as per the nature of the event. Such festivals are popular with the entire community, and are attended by women, men and children. The most famous events hosted in Qassim are the Buraidah Recreational Festival, Unaizah Tourism Festival, and the Al-Mithnib Summer Festival.

In addition, date festivals are held in Qassim to highlight that the Province is distinguished for its farms and dates. Shopping at the Qassim date market is a unique experience, especially during the harvest season during August and September. Al-Qassim's desert parks become more favorable during the winter and spring seasons, attracting desert lovers as well as the locals and visitors who seek rejuvenation and enjoyment in the open spaces and natural environment. These parks host the spring festivals that are usually organized during the mid-year vacation periods. The festival feature multiple activities and events that highlight the festival's nature and location.

In Al-Qassim, a number of festivals are organized in various places during different periods to recognize the city's heritage. The most prominent festivals include Al-Khelija and Traditional Products Festival in Buraidah, Entajee Festival in Unaizah, Al-Musawkaf Traditional Festival in Unaizah, Eid Al-Khabra Festival, Reef Al-Awshaziyah Festival, and Al-Russ Heritage Festival.

The region hosts many hotels, apartments and resorts for its year around visitors, such as the Mövenpick Hotel in Buraidah, Golden Tulip in Buraidah and Unaizah, Radisson blue in Buraidah, Boudl Resort and Apartments in Buraidah and Unaizah, and the Ramada Hotel in Al-Bukairiyah. Although variety of resorts and chalets and farm are offered such as Al-Malfa Rural Resorts in Unaizah.

== See also ==
- Provinces of Saudi Arabia
- List of governorates of Saudi Arabia
- List of cities and towns in Saudi Arabia
