= List of Padma Bhushan award recipients (2010–2019) =

List of recipients of a civilian award in India

Padma Bhushan
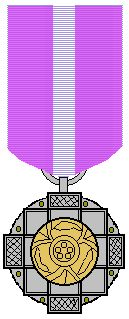
- Type: National Civilian
- Country: India
- Presented by: Government of India
- Ribbon
- Obverse: A centrally located lotus flower is embossed and the text "Padma" written in Devanagari script is placed above and the text "Bhushan" is placed below the lotus.
- Reverse: A platinum State Emblem of India placed in the centre with the national motto of India, "Satyameva Jayate" (Truth alone triumphs) in Devanagari Script
- Established: 1954
- First award: 1954

Highlights
- Total: 218
- Website: http://www.padmaawards.gov.in/

Precedence
- Next (higher): Padma Vibhushan

- Next (lower): Padma Shri

The Padma Bhushan is the third-highest civilian award of the Republic of India. Instituted on 2 January 1954, the award is given for "distinguished service of a high order", without distinction of race, occupation, position, or sex. The recipients receive a Sanad, a certificate signed by the President of India and a circular-shaped medallion with no monetary association. The recipients are announced every year on Republic Day (26 January) and registered in The Gazette of India—a publication used for official government notices and released weekly by the Department of Publication, under the Ministry of Urban Development. The conferral of the award is not considered official without its publication in the Gazette. The name of a recipient, whose award has been revoked or restored, both of which require the authority of the President, is archived and they are required to surrender their medal when their name is struck from the register. As of 2019, none of the conferments of Padma Bhushan during the 2010s have been revoked or restored. The recommendations are received from all the state and the union territory governments, as well as from Ministries of the Government of India, the Bharat Ratna and the Padma Vibhushan awardees, the Institutes of Excellence, the Ministers, the Chief Ministers and the Governors of State, and the Members of Parliament including private individuals.

When instituted in 1954, the Padma Bhushan was classified as "Dusra Varg" (Class II) under the three-tier Padma Vibhushan awards, which were preceded by the Bharat Ratna in hierarchy. On 15 January 1955, the Padma Vibhushan was reclassified into three different awards as the Padma Vibhushan, the Padma Bhushan and the Padma Shri. The criteria included "distinguished service of a high order in any field including service rendered by Government servants", but excluded those working with the public sector undertakings with the exception of doctors and scientists. The 1954 statutes did not allow posthumous awards; this was subsequently modified in the January 1955 statute. The design was also changed to the form that is currently in use; it portrays a circular-shaped toned bronze medallion 1 3/4 inches (44 mm) in diameter and 1/8 inch (3.2 mm) thick. The centrally placed pattern made of outer lines of a square of 1 3/16 inches (30 mm) side is embossed with a knob carved within each of the outer angles of the pattern. A raised circular space of diameter 1 1/16 inches (27 mm) is placed at the centre of the decoration. A centrally located lotus flower is embossed on the obverse side of the medal and the text "Padma" is placed above and the text "Bhushan" is placed below the lotus written in Devanagari script. The State Emblem of India is displayed in the centre of the reverse side, together with the national motto of India, "Satyameva Jayate" (Truth alone triumphs) in Devanagari script, which is inscribed on the lower edge. The rim, the edges and all embossing on either side is of standard gold with the text "Padma Bhushan" of gold gilt. The medal is suspended by a pink riband 1 1/4 inches (32 mm) in width with a broad white stripe in the middle. It is ranked fifth in the order of precedence of wearing of medals and decorations of the Indian civilian and military awards. (Note: The order of precedence is: Bharat Ratna, Param Vir Chakra, Ashoka Chakra, Padma Vibhushan and Padma Bhushan.)

As of 2019, a total of 218 individuals have been conferred with the award in 2010s – forty-three conferments were presented in 2010, followed by thirty-one in 2011, twenty-eight in 2012, twenty-three in 2013, twenty-four in 2014, twenty in 2015, nineteen in 2016, seven in 2017, nine in 2018, and fourteen in 2019. Since 2010, the Padma Bhushan have been conferred upon thirty foreign recipients – twenty from the United States, three from the United Kingdom, and one each from Bangladesh, Germany, Ireland, Russia, Singapore, South Africa, and Thailand. Individuals from ten different fields were awarded, which includes sixty artists, thirty-five from literature and education, twenty-four from science and engineering, twenty-one from trade and industry, eighteen from medicine, fifteen civil servants, seventeen from public affairs, ten sportspersons, eight from social work, and eleven from other fields. Most recently on 25 January 2019, the award has been bestowed upon fourteen recipients.

== Overview ==
Award recipients by year
Year	Number of recipients
2010	43
2011	31
2012	28
2013	23
2014	24
2015	20
2016	19
2017	7
2018	9
2019	14

Award recipients by field
Field	Number of recipients
Arts	60
Civil Service	15
Literature & Education	36
Medicine	18
Others	9
Public Affairs	17
Science & Engineering	24
Social Work	8
Sports	10
Trade & Industry	21

== Recipients ==
Key
* Non-citizen recipient	# Posthumous recipient

List of Padma Bhushan award recipients (2010–2019)
Year	Image	Laureates	Field	State / country
2010		Satya Paul Agarwal	Medicine	Delhi
2010		Mohammad Amin	Literature and Education	Delhi
2010		Sailesh Kumar Bandopadhyay	Public Affairs	Jharkhand
2010		M. S. Banga*	Trade and Industry	United Kingdom
2010		Anil Bordia	Literature and Education	Rajasthan
2010		Bipan Chandra	Literature and Education	Delhi
2010		B. K. Chaturvedi	Civil Service	Delhi
2010		Sant Singh Chatwal*	Public Affairs	United States
2010		G. P. Chopra	Literature and Education	Delhi
2010		Tan Chung*	Literature and Education	United States
2010		Madhusudan Dhaky	Arts	Gujarat
2010		P. R. Dubhashi	Civil Service	Maharashtra
2010		Puttaraj Gawai	Arts	Karnataka
2010		Belle Monappa Hegde	Medicine	Karnataka
2010		Ilaiyaraaja	Arts	Tamil Nadu
2010		Jagdish Chandra Kapur	Science and Engineering	Delhi
2010		Shrinivas Khale	Arts	Maharashtra
2010		Aamir Khan	Arts	Maharashtra
2010		Sultan Khan	Arts	Maharashtra
2010		Ram Kumar	Arts	Delhi
2010		Kumudini Lakhia	Arts	Gujarat
2010		Kuzhur Narayana Marar	Arts	Kerala
2010		Chhannulal Mishra	Arts	Uttar Pradesh
2010		E. T. Narayanan Mooss	Medicine	Kerala
2010		C. P. Krishnan Nair	Trade and Industry	Maharashtra
2010		S. P. Oswal	Trade and Industry	Punjab
2010		Akbar Padamsee	Arts	Maharashtra
2010		Ramakanta Panda	Medicine	Maharashtra
2010		Balasaheb Vikhe Patil	Social Work	Maharashtra
2010		Arogyaswami Paulraj*	Science and Engineering	United States
2010		A. R. Rahman	Arts	Tamil Nadu
2010		Moosa Raza	Civil Service	Delhi
2010		Mallika Sarabhai	Arts	Gujarat
2010		Nookala Chinna Satyanarayana	Arts	Andhra Pradesh
2010		Abhijit Sen	Public Affairs	Delhi
2010		Satya Vrat Shastri	Literature and Education	Delhi
2010		Noshir M. Shroff	Medicine	Delhi
2010		Kushal Pal Singh	Trade and Industry	Delhi
2010		Bikash Sinha	Science and Engineering	West Bengal
2010		Balagangadharanatha Swamiji	Social Work	Karnataka
2010		Narayanan Vaghul	Trade and Industry	Tamil Nadu
2010		P. K. Warrier	Medicine	Kerala
2010		Fareed Zakaria#	Literature and Education	United States
2011		S. P. Balasubrahmanyam	Arts	Andhra Pradesh
2011		Rajashree Birla	Social Work	Maharashtra
2011		M. N. Buch	Civil Service	Madhya Pradesh
2011		C. V. Chandrasekhar	Arts	Tamil Nadu
2011		Ajai Chowdhry	Trade and Industry	Delhi
2011		Yogesh Chander Deveshwar	Trade and Industry	West Bengal
2011		Satyadev Dubey	Arts	Maharashtra
2011		T. J. S. George	Literature and Education	Karnataka
2011		Shankha Ghosh	Literature and Education	West Bengal
2011		Kris Gopalakrishnan	Trade & Industry	Karnataka
2011		Keki Byramjee Grant# (Note: Keki Byramjee Grant died on 4 January 2011, at the age of 90.)	Medicine	Maharashtra
2011		Shashi Kapoor	Arts	Maharashtra
2011		Krishen Khanna	Arts	Haryana
2011		Mohammed Zahur Khayyam	Arts	Maharashtra
2011		Chanda Kochhar	Trade and Industry	Maharashtra
2011		Dwijen Mukhopadhyay	Arts	West Bengal
2011		Madavoor Vasudevan Nair	Arts	Kerala
2011		Ramdas Pai	Literature and Education	Karnataka
2011		Dashrath Patel# (Note: Dashrath Patel died on 2 December 2010, at the age of 83.)	Arts	Gujarat
2011		Rajendra Singh Pawar	Trade and Industry	Haryana
2011		S. Ramachandran	Science and Engineering	Tamil Nadu
2011		Shobhana Ranade	Social Work	Maharashtra
2011		Gunupati Venkata Krishna Reddy	Trade and Industry	Andhra Pradesh
2011		Kallam Anji Reddy	Trade and Industry	Andhra Pradesh
2011		Waheeda Rehman	Arts	Maharashtra
2011		Shyam Saran	Civil Service	Delhi
2011		Analjit Singh	Trade and Industry	Delhi
2011		Arpita Singh	Arts	Delhi
2011		Surendra Singh	Civil Service	Delhi
2011		R. K. Srikantan	Arts	Karnataka
2011		Raghavan Thirumulpad# (Note: Raghavan Thirumulpad died on 21 November 2010, at the age of 90.)	Medicine	Kerala
2012		Suresh H. Advani	Medicine	Maharashtra
2012		Shabana Azmi	Arts	Maharashtra
2012		Homi K. Bhabha*	Literature and Education	United Kingdom
2012		Shashikumar Chitre	Science and Engineering	Maharashtra
2012		Khaled Choudhury	Arts	West Bengal
2012		Jatin Das	Arts	Delhi
2012		Vidya Dehejia*	Literature and Education	United States
2012		Dharmendra	Arts	Maharashtra
2012		S. N. Goenka	Social Work	Maharashtra
2012		M. S. Gopalakrishnan	Arts	Tamil Nadu
2012		T. V. Gopalakrishnan	Arts	Tamil Nadu
2012		Buddhadev Das Gupta	Arts	West Bengal
2012		Sunil Janah*	Arts	United States
2012		Anish Kapoor*	Arts	United Kingdom
2012		S. B. Mujumdar	Literature and Education	Maharashtra
2012		Balasubramanian Muthuraman	Trade and Industry	Maharashtra
2012		Mira Nair	Arts	Delhi
2012		Arvind Panagariya*	Literature and Education	United States
2012		José Pereira*	Literature and Education	United States
2012		Mata Prasad	Civil Service	Uttar Pradesh
2012		M. S. Raghunathan	Science and Engineering	Maharashtra
2012		P. Chandrasekhara Rao*	Public Affairs	Germany
2012		Ronen Sen	Civil Service	West Bengal
2012		Devi Shetty	Medicine	Karnataka
2012		M. V. Subbiah	Trade and Industry	Tamil Nadu
2012		N. Vittal	Civil Service	Kerala
2012		N. H. Wadia	Medicine	Maharashtra
2012		George Yeo*	Public Affairs	Singapore
2013		Satya N. Atluri*	Science and Engineering	United States
2013		Maharaj Kishan Bhan	Civil Service	Delhi
2013		Jaspal Bhatti# (Note: Jaspal Bhatti died on 25 October 2012, at the age of 57.)	Arts	Punjab
2013		Rahul Dravid	Sports	Karnataka
2013		Adi Godrej	Trade and Industry	Maharashtra
2013		Abdul Rashid Khan	Arts	West Bengal
2013		Rajesh Khanna# (Note: Rajesh Khanna died on 18 July 2012, at the age of 69.)	Arts	Maharashtra
2013		Mary Kom	Sports	Manipur
2013		Nandkishore Shamrao Laud	Medicine	Maharashtra
2013		Mangesh Padgaonkar	Literature and Education	Maharashtra
2013		Hemendra Singh Panwar	Civil Service	Madhya Pradesh
2013		Jogesh Pati*	Science and Engineering	United States
2013		Shivajirao Girdhar Patil	Public Affairs	Maharashtra
2013		A. Sivathanu Pillai	Science and Engineering	Delhi
2013		D. Ramanaidu	Arts	Andhra Pradesh
2013		Kanak Rele	Arts	Maharashtra
2013		V. K. Saraswat	Science and Engineering	Delhi
2013		Ashoke Sen	Science and Engineering	Uttar Pradesh
2013		Gayatri Chakravorty Spivak	Literature and Education	United States
2013		B. N. Suresh	Science and Engineering	Karnataka
2013		Sharmila Tagore	Arts	Delhi
2013		Ramamurthy Thyagarajan	Trade and Industry	Tamil Nadu
2013		Saroja Vaidyanathan	Arts	Delhi
2014		Anisuzzaman*	Literature and Education	Bangladesh
2014		Mrityunjay Athreya	Literature and Education	Delhi
2014		Padmanabhan Balaram	Science and Engineering	Karnataka
2014		Dalveer Bhandari	Public Affairs	Delhi
2014		Ruskin Bond	Literature and Education	Uttarakhand
2014		Anita Desai	Literature and Education	Delhi
2014		Pullela Gopichand	Sports	Andhra Pradesh
2014		Kamal Haasan	Arts	Tamil Nadu
2014		Jyeshtharaj Joshi	Science and Engineering	Maharashtra
2014		Vijayendra Nath Kaul	Civil Service	Delhi
2014		Neelam Kler	Medicine	Delhi
2014		Madappa Mahadevappa	Science and Engineering	Karnataka
2014		Leander Paes	Sports	Maharashtra
2014		K. Radhakrishnan	Science and Engineering	Karnataka
2014		Anumolu Ramakrishna# (Note: Anumolu Ramakrishna died on 20 August 2013, at the age of 73.)	Science and Engineering	Andhra Pradesh
2014		Thirumalachari Ramasami	Science and Engineering	Delhi
2014		Lloyd Rudolph*	Literature and Education	United States
2014		Susanne Hoeber Rudolph*	Literature and Education	United States
2014		Vinod Prakash Sharma	Science and Engineering	Delhi
2014		Ghulam Mohammed Sheikh	Arts	Gujarat
2014		Begum Parveen Sultana	Arts	Maharashtra
2014		Dhirubhai Thaker	Literature and Education	Gujarat
2014		Vairamuthu	Literature and Education	Tamil Nadu
2014		T. H. Vinayakram	Arts	Tamil Nadu
2015		Jahnu Barua	Arts	Assam
2015		Manjul Bhargava*	Science and Engineering	United States
2015		Vijay Bhatkar	Science and Engineering	Maharashtra
2015		Swapan Dasgupta	Literature and Education	Delhi
2015		David Frawley*	Literature and Education	United States
2015		Bill Gates*	Social Work	United States
2015		Melinda Gates*	Social Work	United States
2015		Satyamitranand Giri	Others	Uttar Pradesh
2015		N. Gopalaswami	Civil Service	Tamil Nadu
2015		Subhash C. Kashyap	Public Affairs	Delhi
2015		Gokulotsavji Maharaj	Arts	Madhya Pradesh
2015		Saichiro Misumi*	Public Affairs	Japan
2015		Ambrish Mithal	Medicine	Delhi
2015		Sudha Ragunathan	Arts	Tamil Nadu
2015		Harish Salve	Public Affairs	Delhi
2015		Ashok Seth	Medicine	Delhi
2015		Rajat Sharma	Literature and Education	Delhi
2015		Satpal Singh	Sports	Delhi
2015		Shivakumara Swami	Others	Karnataka
2015		Khadg Singh Valdiya	Science and Engineering	Karnataka
2016		Ravindra Chandra Bhargava	Public Affairs	Uttar Pradesh
2016		Robert Blackwill*	Public Affairs	United States
2016		Hafeez Contractor	Others	Maharashtra
2016		Indu Jain	Trade and Industry	Delhi
2016		Heisnam Kanhailal	Arts	Manipur
2016		Anupam Kher	Arts	Maharashtra
2016		Sania Mirza	Sports	Telangana
2016		Pallonji Mistry*	Trade and Industry	Ireland
2016		Udit Narayan	Arts	Maharashtra
2016		Saina Nehwal	Sports	Haryana
2016		Yarlagadda Lakshmi Prasad	Literature and Education	Andhra Pradesh
2016		Vinod Rai	Civil Service	Kerala
2016		N. S. Ramanuja Tatacharya	Literature and Education	Maharashtra
2016		A. V. Rama Rao	Science and Engineering	Andhra Pradesh
2016		D. Nageshwar Reddy	Medicine	Telangana
2016		Dayananda Saraswati# (Note: Dayananda Saraswati died on 23 September 2015, at the age of 85.)	Others	Uttarakhand
2016		Barjinder Singh Hamdard	Literature and Education	Punjab
2016		Ram V. Sutar	Arts	Uttar Pradesh
2016		Tejomayananda	Others	Maharashtra
2017		Vishwa Mohan Bhatt	Arts	Rajasthan
2017		Deviprasad Dwivedi	Literature and Education	Uttar Pradesh
2017		Ratnasundarsuri	Others	Gujarat
2017		Niranjanananda Saraswati	Others	Bihar
2017		Cho Ramaswamy# (Note: Cho Ramaswamy died on 7 December 2016, at the age of 82.)	Literature and Education	Tamil Nadu
2017		Maha Chakri Sirindhorn*	Literature and Education	Thailand
2017		Tehemton Erach Udwadia	Medicine	Maharashtra
2018		Pankaj Advani	Sports	Karnataka
2018		Philipose Mar Chrysostom	Others	Kerala
2018		Mahendra Singh Dhoni	Sports	Jharkhand
2018		Alexander Kadakin# (Note: Alexander Kadakin died on 26 January 2017, at the age of 67.)	Public Affairs	Russia
2018		Ramachandran Nagaswamy	Others	Tamil Nadu
2018		Ved Prakash Nanda*	Literature and Education	United States
2018		Laxman Pai	Arts	Goa
2018		Arvind Parikh	Arts	Maharashtra
2018		Sharda Sinha	Arts	Bihar
2019		John T. Chambers*	Trade and Industry	United States
2019		Sukhdev Singh Dhindsa	Public Affairs	Punjab
2019		Pravin Gordhan*	Public Affairs	South Africa
2019		Mahashay Dharampal Gulati	Trade and Industry	Delhi
2019		Darshan Lal Jain	Social Work	Haryana
2019		Ashok Laxmanrao Kukade	Medicine	Maharashtra
2019		Kariya Munda	Public Affairs	Jharkhand
2019		Budhaditya Mukherjee	Arts	West Bengal
2019		Mohanlal	Arts	Kerala
2019		Nambi Narayanan	Science and Engineering	Kerala
2019		Kuldip Nayar# (Note: Kuldip Nayar died on 23 August 2018, at the age of 95.)	Literature and Education	Delhi
2019		Bachendri Pal	Sports	Uttarakhand
2019		V. K. Shunglu	Civil Service	Delhi
2019		Hukmdev Narayan Yadav	Public Affairs	Bihar

== Controversies and refusals ==
The 2010 conferment on an Indian-American businessman Sant Singh Chatwal created much controversy. Awarded in the field of Public Affairs, Chatwal is known for his association with former US President Bill Clinton and his wife Hillary Clinton and pled guilty to violating the Federal Election Campaign Act and witness tampering during the United States presidential election. He was also accused of lobbying for the award by leveraging his contacts in the Prime Minister's Office (PMO) and United States Congress. The Government of India, however, issued a press release defending the conferment. The statement mentioned Chatwal as a "tireless advocate" of the country's interest in the United States. It also clarified that out of five Central Bureau of Investigation (CBI) registered cases against him between 1992 and 1994, three were closed by CBI itself and in remaining two cases, Chatwal was discharged by the Court and as per the reports that were made available to the selection committee, there was "nothing adverse on record against him". According to media reports, there were several cases filed or registered after April 2009 which includes three criminal complaints with Kerala Police and four cases in Delhi High Court and Kerala High Court. Chatwal also served summons in January 2010. However, the then Union Home Secretary Gopal Krishna Pillai said that "no probe has been ordered nor any report sought from anyone".

Earlier in 2008, Chatwal was considered for the Padma Shri but the Indian Embassy in Washington, D.C. declined to nominate Chatwal when asked by the PMO. Ronen Sen, who was then serving as the Indian Ambassador to the United States, had told the PMO that the conferral would not be appropriate because of the controversy associated with Chatwal's financial dealings in two countries. Sen had also mentioned that though positive, Chatwal's contribution are much less compared to other Indian-Americans and the bestowal would not only "demoralise the others who had done much more" but also would create "the impression that India did not regard lack of transparency in financial dealings as a disqualification for its highest honours".

In 2013, playback singer S. Janaki refused to accept her award and stated that "the award has come late in her five-and-half-decade long career". The singer also mentioned that she is not against the Government and expressed happiness for the recognition but requested the Government to "show some more consideration to the artists from the southern parts of the country". In 2014, family members of J. S. Verma who served as 27th Chief Justice of India refused the posthumous conferral stating that "Verma himself would not have accepted" the honour as he "never hankered or lobbied for any acclaim, reward or favour". (Note: J. S. Verma died on 22 April 2013, at the age of 80.)

== Explanatory notes ==
Non-citizen recipients

Posthumous recipients
