= King Fahd Hospital =

King Fahd Hospital may refer to:

- King Fahd University Hospital, Khobar, Saudi Arabia
- King Fahad Specialist Hospital Dammam, Saudi Arabia
- King Fahad Hospital Jeddah, Saudi Arabia

== See also ==
- King Fahd Medical City, Riyadh, Saudi Arabia
