= King Fahd (disambiguation) =

King Fahd or Fahd of Saudi Arabia (1921–2005) was a Saudi monarch.

King Fahd or King Fahad may also refer to:

- King Fahad Academy, an independent school in Acton, London, England
- King Fahd Academy (Germany), a school in Lannesdorf, Bonn, Germany
- King Fahad Air Base, in Taif, Saudi Arabia
- King Fahd Bridge, in Bamako, Mali
- King Fahd Causeway, connecting Saudi Arabia and Bahrain
- King Fahd Complex for the Printing of the Holy Quran, in Medina, Saudi Arabia
- King Fahd's Fountain, in Jeddah, Saudi Arabia
- King Fahd Hospital (disambiguation)
- King Fahd International Airport, in Dammam, Saudi Arabia
- King Fahd International Stadium, in Riyadh, Saudi Arabia
- King Fahd Islamic Cultural Center, in Buenos Aires, Argentina
- King Fahd Medical City, Riyadh, Saudi Arabia
- King Fahd Mosque (disambiguation)
- King Fahad National Library, Riyadh, Saudi Arabia
- King Fahd Naval Academy, Jubail, Saudi Arabia
- King Fahd Security College, Riyadh, Saudi Arabia
- King Fahd Stadium, Ta'if, in Taif, Saudi Arabia
- King Fahd University of Petroleum and Minerals in Dhahran, Saudi Arabia
