= Shamrao =

Shamrao is a given name and middle name. People with the name include:

- Shamrao Pandurang Patil
- Shamrao Madkaikar
- Shamrao Vishnu Parulekar
- Krishna Shamrao Kulkarni
- Nandkishore Shamrao Laud
- Sanjay Shamrao Dhotre
- Sudhakar Shamrao Deshmukh

== See also ==
- Shamrao Vithal Co-operative Bank
