= KFU =

KFU may refer to:

- Kazan Federal University, in Russia
- King Faisal University, in Saudi Arabia
