= King Fahad Specialist Hospital Dammam =

King Fahad Specialist Hospital- Dammam مستشفى الملك فهد التخصصي بالدمام
- Ministry of Health
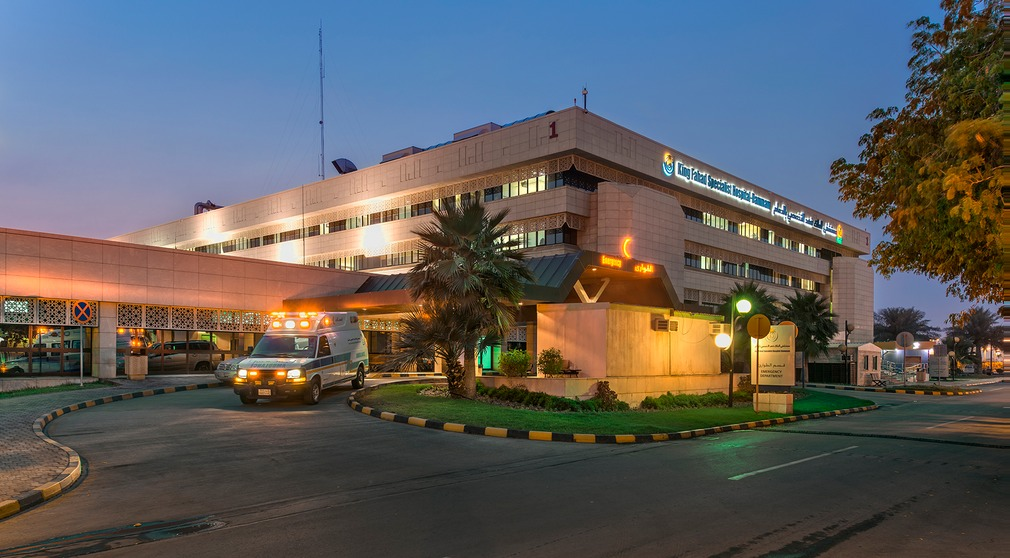
- Hospital building

Geography
- Location: Dammam, Eastern Region, Saudi Arabia
- Coordinates: 26.41208°N 50.10288°E

Organisation
- Type: Specialist, District General

Services
- Standards: JCI / CAP / CBAHI / IAEA / ASHI / AACME
- Emergency department: Yes

History
- Founded: 2005

Links
- Website: http://WWW.KFSH.med.sa

King Fahad Specialist Hospital-Dammam (Arabic: مستشفى الملك فهد التخصصي بالدمام) (KFSHD) is a district general hospital in the Eastern region of Saudi Arabia.

== History ==
KFSH-D is located in the Eastern Region of Saudi Arabia. Hospital construction began in 1984 and was completed in 1999. Initially named "Gulf Hospital", it was renamed "King Fahad Specialist Hospital-Dammam" by a Royal Decree.

On 17 September 2005, King Abdullah Bin Abdul-Aziz inaugurated the Hospital. In 2008, the hospital started to serve as a tertiary referral hospital offering specialized medical care in Oncology, Organ Transplant, Neurosciences, Cardiac Services, and Genetic Sciences. Other specialized services such as Hematology, Nuclear Medicine, Orthopedic Surgery, Urology, Emergency Medicine and others became available as well.

== Location ==
King Fahad Hospital-Dammam is located in the Eastern Region of Saudi Arabia, Dammam City, Al Murekbat area, Omar Bin Thabet Street.

== Board of directors ==
In 2009, the Ministry of Health (MOH) established a Board of Directors to oversee and guide the operation of four specialized, newly developed and recognized hospitals under the leadership and patronage of Dr. Abdullah Al Rabeeah, the Minister of Health.

== Scope of Service ==
KFSH-D provides tertiary specialty health care services mainly for the Eastern Region in the Kingdom of Saudi Arabia. Patient referral is usually initiated by secondary care hospitals. Self-referral for tertiary medical care can be processed and accepted in limited cases.

=== AACME ===
The Academic Affairs gained the American Academy of Continuing Medical Education (AACME) accreditation to become the first MOH hospital in Saudi Arabia. KFSH-D was awarded the AACME accreditation in September.

== KFSH-D Core Competencies ==
One of the latest achievements of KFSH-D is the establishment of the Stem Cell Transplant Service that performed a total of 181 transplants from 2010 to 2015. KFSH-D is the only center amongst the Ministry of Health hospitals in Saudi Arabia that provides this highly specialized service.

1. Multi Organ Transplant Center (MOTC) of KFSH-D was established in 2008 to cover the need for organ transplantations in the Eastern Province and the kingdom. The MOTC continued to expand since the first kidney transplant in September 2008 to meet the growing needs. King Fahad Specialist Hospital-Dammam continues to work closely with the Saudi Center for Organ Transplantation (SCOT), the Eastern Province health authorities, and the other hospitals in the Kingdom.
  Services
  - Adult/Pediatric Hepatology Services
  - Pre- Post renal & Pancreases Transplant Care (Adult + Pediatrics)
  - Pre- Post Liver Transplant Care
  - HIL/ABO incompatible transplantation
  - Transplant Outreach Program
  - Organ Donor Mobile Team
2. The Oncology Center is one of the core competencies of King Fahad Specialist Hospital, Dammam. It offers specialized oncology comprehensive care including the following:
  - Adult medical oncology
  - Adult hematology oncology and stem cell transplant
  - Pediatric hematology oncology and stem cell transplant
  - Palliative care
  - Radiation therapy
  Scope of services
  - Solid tumors
  - Blood malignancies
  - Bone marrow and stem cell therapy for blood and solid malignancies as well as for bone marrow failures and complicated congenital anemia
  The Oncology Center offers multidisciplinary care programs including conventional and advanced oncology therapeutic methods such as chemotherapy, radiation therapy, total body irradiation, oncology surgery, bone marrow transplant, autologous or allogenic target cell therapy, and immunotherapy. In addition, the Radiation Therapy Department is developing a very sophisticated technique of Intraoperative Radiation Therapy (IORT).
3. The Neurosciences Center is another area of KFSH-D. It incorporates the following departments:
  - Neurosurgery Department
  - Spine Department
  - Neurology Department
  - Pediatric Neurology Department
  - Mental Health Department
  - Physical Medicine and Rehabilitation Department
  - Clinical Neurophysiology Department
  Services provided
  - care in specialized areas of Neurosciences
  - Neurosurgery: complex spine surgery, skull base surgery, vascular neurosurgery, epilepsy surgery, pediatric neurosurgery
  - Neurology: epilepsy, multiple sclerosis & autoimmune neurology, neuromuscular disorders, movement disorders, and sleep medicine
  - Pediatric Neurology: epilepsy, neuromuscular disorders, neuro-developmental disorders, neuro-metabolic disorders
  - Mental Health: liaison psychiatry and clinical psychology
  - Physical Medicine & Rehabilitation: neurorehabilitation, spasticity, pain, musculoskeletal rehabilitation, rehabilitation for amputees

== Collaboration agreements ==
KFSH-D has developed, over a very short time, several joint collaborative agreements with hospitals and health centers in North America and Europe. On the regional level, similar joint agreements have been achieved with Saudi and Arab universities.

International

1. Roswell Park Comprehensive Cancer Center
2. Nebraska Medical Center
3. University of California, San Diego
4. St. Jude Children's Research Hospital
5. The Children's Hospital of Philadelphia
6. University of Alabama at Birmingham
7. Rehabilitation Institute of Michigan
8. Calgary Laboratory Services
9. University Health Network
10. The Research Institute McGill University Health Center
11. Arab Gulf University

National

1. King Fahd University of Petroleum & Minerals
2. Prince Mohammad bin Fahd University
3. King Saud University
4. Al Ghad International Colleges for Health Sciences
5. Dammam University
6. Saudi Arabian Cultural Mission in USA

== Medical staff, training, and research ==
The hospital has been recognized by the Saudi Council for Health Specialties (SCFHS) as a center of specialized training in multiple medical and allied health programs. Medical scholars from Arab neighboring countries are also trained in KFSH-D to become diplomat of Saudi Board and/or Arab Board in different specialties. The Research Administration was first established in January 2010; the IRB (Institutional Review Board) reviews and approves submitted research proposals in the area of clinical research with a vision to expand to the basic research as well.

== KFSH-D departments ==
1. Medical Departments
  1. Nursing
  2. Medical & Clinical Affairs
    1. Medical Imaging
    2. Anesthesia
    3. Critical Care
    4. Medicine
    5. Pediatrics
    6. Dietary Therapy
    7. Physiotherapy
    8. Family Medicine
    9. Obstetrics and Gynecology
    10. Respiratory Therapy
    11. Surgery
    12. Infection Control
    13. Home Health Care
    14. Pathology & Laboratory Medicine
      1. Anatomic Pathology
      2. Blood Bank and Transfusion Medicine
      3. Chemistry
      4. Cytogenetics Laboratory
      5. Flowcytometry Laboratory
      6. Histocompatibility and Immunogenetics Laboratory
      7. Immunology Laboratory
      8. Microbiology Laboratory
      9. Molecular Diagnostics Laboratory
    15. Health Education
    16. Social Services
    17. Multi Organ Transplant Center
    18. Oncology Center
    19. Neurosciences Center
    20. Urology
    21. Emergency Medicine
2. Administrative Departments
  1. Academic Affairs, Training and Research
    1. Research
    2. Training
    3. Office of International Collaboration
    4. Academic Affairs
  2. Hospital Operations
    1. Support Services
    2. Housing Services
    3. Security and Safety
    4. Food Services
    5. Maintenance Services
  3. Information Technology Services
    1. Healthcare Informatics
    2. Enterprise Application Management
    3. Systems Management Services and Operations
    4. IT Management Services and Support
    5. Clinical Engineering
  4. Quality and Strategic Planning
    1. Decision Support
    2. Risk Management
    3. Strategic Planning
    4. Accreditation
    5. Performance Excellence
  5. Financial Affairs Administration
  6. Human Resources Administration

== Future of KFSH-D ==
King Khalid Medical City (KKMC) is a large health project planned to be the "leading center of excellence in specialized healthcare" serving seven million with a focus on integrated treatment, research and education. The largest of the five medical cities underway in the Kingdom, located on a 700,000 square meter site, the King Khalid Medical City (KKMC), Dammam is envisioned to be the leading center of excellence for tertiary referral healthcare in the Kingdom’s Eastern Region.

== See also ==
- List of hospitals in Saudi Arabia
- King Fahd Medical City
