= College of Dentistry University of Dammam =

College of Dentistry, Imam Abdulrahman bin Faisal University
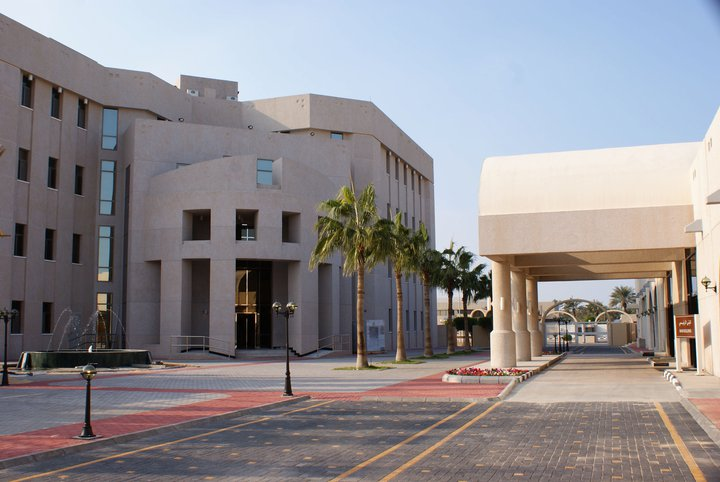
- View of both buildings of the College of Dentistry
- Established: 2001
- Location: Dammam, Eastern Province, Saudi Arabia
- Website: www.iau.edu.sa/en/colleges/college-of-dentistry

The College of Dentistry at the Imam Abdulrahman bin Faisal University is a school of Dentistry associated with the Imam Abdulrahman bin Faisal University; its purpose is to disseminate knowledge of all disciplines of dentistry and promote development in dental education, treatment, and research.

The College of Dentistry was founded in 2001–2002 AD under the patronage of King Faisal University, Dammam. It is the first dental college in the Eastern Province and the third dental educational institution in the Kingdom of Saudi Arabia.

== Deans of the College of Dentistry ==
There have been four deans of the College:

- Prof. Dr. Abdulsalam Abdullah Al Sulaiman (2001–2005) - Founding Dean
- Prof. Dr. Abdullah Mohammad Al Rubaish (2005–2007)
- Dr. Ra'ed Mohammad Bukhari (2007–2009)
- Prof. Fahad Ahmed Al Harbi (2009–2019)
- Dr. Jehan Ahmed AlHumaid (2019–Present)

== Vice Deans ==
- Dr. Muhanad Alhareky, Vice Dean for Academic Affairs
- Dr. Faisal Al Onaizan, Vice Dean for Clinical Affairs
- Dr. Suliman Shahin, Vice Dean for Studies Development and Community Service
- Dr. Faisal Alqarni, Vice Dean for Postgraduate Studies and Scientific Research
- Dr. Maram AlGhamdi, Vice Dean for Female Student Affairs

== Departments ==
=== Biomedical Dental Sciences ===
Dept. Head: Dr. Amr Bugshan

==== Oral and Maxillofacial Surgery ====
In this division, the students are trained on the clinical skills necessary for tooth extraction. They are also trained to apply different surgical techniques to manage aesthetic and prosthetic situations, trauma, and tumors.

==== Oral Biology ====
Is the study of the basic biological characteristics of the oral tissue and peri-oral areas in health and their application in sickness

==== Oral Radiology ====
In this division, students learn the physics of radiation, how to make radiographs and how to interpret them.

==== Oral Diagnosis ====
This division aims to teach and train the students the modern techniques used in diagnosis of oral diseases.

=== Preventive Dental Sciences ===
Dept. Head: Dr. Muhanad Alhareky

- Orthodontics

Dr. Essam Nassar Dr. Naif Al Masoud Dr. Suliman Shahin

- Periodontics

Dr. Khalid Al Mas Dr. Adel Alagl Dr. Steph Smith Dr. Abdulkareem Al Hhmaidan

- Pedodontics

Dr. Azza Taguldin Dr. Yousef Al Yousef Dr. Jehan AL Humaid Dr. Muhannad Alhareky Dr. Sumit Bedi Dr. Eman Bakhurji Dr. Mazin Alqahtani

- Community Dental Health and Public Health

Dr. Khalifa Al Khalifa Dr. Asim Al Ansari Dr. Balgis Gaffar

=== Restorative Dental Sciences ===
Dept. Head: Dr. Khalid AlMulhim

- Endodontics

Dr. Emad AlShwaimi

- Operative Dentistry
- Bio-Dental Material

=== Substitutive Dental Sciences ===
Dept. Head: Dr. Yousif AlDulaijan

- Fixed Prosthodontics
- Advanced Prosthodontics
- Removable Prosthodontics

Dr. Amr Mahrous

== General information ==
=== Admission requirements ===
To be admitted to the College of Dentistry, the students must:

- Hold Saudi Nationality
- Hold Saudi high school certificate, science section or its equivalent
- Not have exceeded two years from the date of graduation from high school
- Be of good behavior and conduct
- Pass the professional health assessment
- Pass the examination of the National Center for Assessment

=== Academic counseling ===
As the university colleges and programs for study are diversified, the college administration is very keen to prepare, develop and apply special counseling programs to orient and advise students on curriculum, study courses, college departments and available student's activities. This starts from admission to the college and continues throughout the years of study. The students are arranged in small groups, each supervised by one faculty staff member.

The aim of Academic counseling is to recognize problems and difficulties, which the students may encounter during their studies, as well as to encourage their participation and cooperation with their colleagues in other colleges to interact with the community.

=== Teaching aids ===
The College of Dentistry has an audiovisual unit, which provides teaching aid services, overhead and transparent projectors, models, mannequins, modern computer display equivalent, televisions, videos and cassette recorders; it also provide medical photography services for the faculty staff and students. Along with this there is a computer laboratory for students, not only to enhance their computer skills but to use this powerful tool for learning as well.

=== Community services ===
One of the main purposes of the College of Dentistry is to improve the health awareness and education of all community members. The community dentistry department organize and conducts outreach programs and symposia, which cover the health centers and other community service centers and facilities.the community dentistry department also provides oral health care education and treatment for residents of social care homes. The College provides many activities in this field such as:

- Annual Dental Symposium (ADS)
- Monthly educational and scientific lectures
- Training courses
