= UOD =

Did you mean: Oud?

UOD may mean:

- Unión Obrera Democrática Filipina, Philippines.
- University of Dammam, Saudi Arabia.
- University of Delaware, Newark.
- University of Delhi, India.
- University of Derby, England.
- University of Durham, England.
- University of Dublin, Ireland.
- University of Dundee, Scotland.
- Universe of Discourse
- Uniform of the Day
