= Maha Al-Mozaini =

Saudi Arabian biomedical scientist

- Born: 1974 (age 51–52); Riyadh, Saudi Arabia
- Education: King Saud University; Imperial College London; Harvard Medical School
- Known for: Translational research Virology

Maha Al Mozaini (born 1974) is a Saudi Arabian Professor and Research Scientist. She is the head of a special research unit that works on different immunodeficiency diseases, where she supervises a group of graduate students, laboratory technicians, and scientists. She was the first person to establish an HIV laboratory in the King Faisal Specialist Hospital and Research Centre, and has since gone on to develop a large number of additional medical laboratories across Saudi Arabia.

== Early life and education ==
Al Mozaini was born in Riyadh, Saudi Arabia. She attended university at King Saud University, KSA and obtained a B.Sc in Applied Medical Laboratory Sciences, graduating in 1996. Subsequently, in 2001, she completed her M.Sc, also at King Saud University, KSU, in Applied Medical Laboratory Sciences. She completed her graduate training by obtaining her Ph.D. in 2007 at the Imperial College School of Medicine, and the UK Ludwig Institute for Cancer Research, in London, UK, working in the laboratory of Dr. Paul Farrell, in the Division of Virology and Immunology.

== Research ==
She started her postdoctoral fellowship at Harvard Medical School in 2009, where she was the recipient of a post-doctoral research fellowship award from the Dubai Harvard Foundation for Medical Research.

She established and is the Director of the "Immunocompromised Host Research" in the Department of Infection and Immunity at Riyadh’s King Faisal Specialist Hospital and Research Center (KFSH&RC).

In 2015 , Al-Mozaini was selected by L'Oreal-UNESCO as the recipient of a L'Oréal-UNESCO For Women in Science Awards Middle East Fellowship Grant, in recognition of her pioneering research, and as a role model for female scientists in the Middle East. Her contributions have also been recognized by the Arab Women Council Awards, and she was selected by Arab Health for a Global Health Pioneer Award in Science from Arab Health.

She has consistently supported female carriers of HIV/AIDS to reduce any stigma surrounding the disease. She was responsible for pushing through the creation of a non-profit organisation that supports women living with HIV (it was a five-year effort). She is also known for her efforts to empower and mentor young women in the STEM fields.

Initially, after Al Mozaini started her own lab in Saudi Arabia, she was working to help organ transplant recipients fight infections (these patients need to take immunosuppressants to prevent rejection of the foreign tissue). Her success on this project led to her including disease pathologies that weaken the immune system including Lupus, multiple sclerosis, and HIV.

Al Mozaini, faced significant obstacles to establishing her HIV-1 research program due to the lack of funding for this field around the Gulf Cooperation Council. Building on the international collaborations studying HIV and transplants that she initiated while at MGH, Ragon, and Harvard, she has continued to make this a priority. In recognition of her tireless efforts she was selected as a temporary adviser to the World Health Organization’s National AIDS Program (for one year).

Beginning in 2023 she also took up a position at the Research, Development and Innovation Authority (RDI) (a branch of the Saudi Arabian Government). There her responsibilities include encouraging and supporting the RDI sector, coordinating the activities of institutions and scientific research centers, proposing policies, legislation, and regulations, and providing sector funding.

== Awards and honors ==
- 2015 L’Oreál-UNESCO Middle East Fellowship Grant
