= Maharaj Kishan Bhan =

Indian pediatrician and clinical scientist (1947–2020)

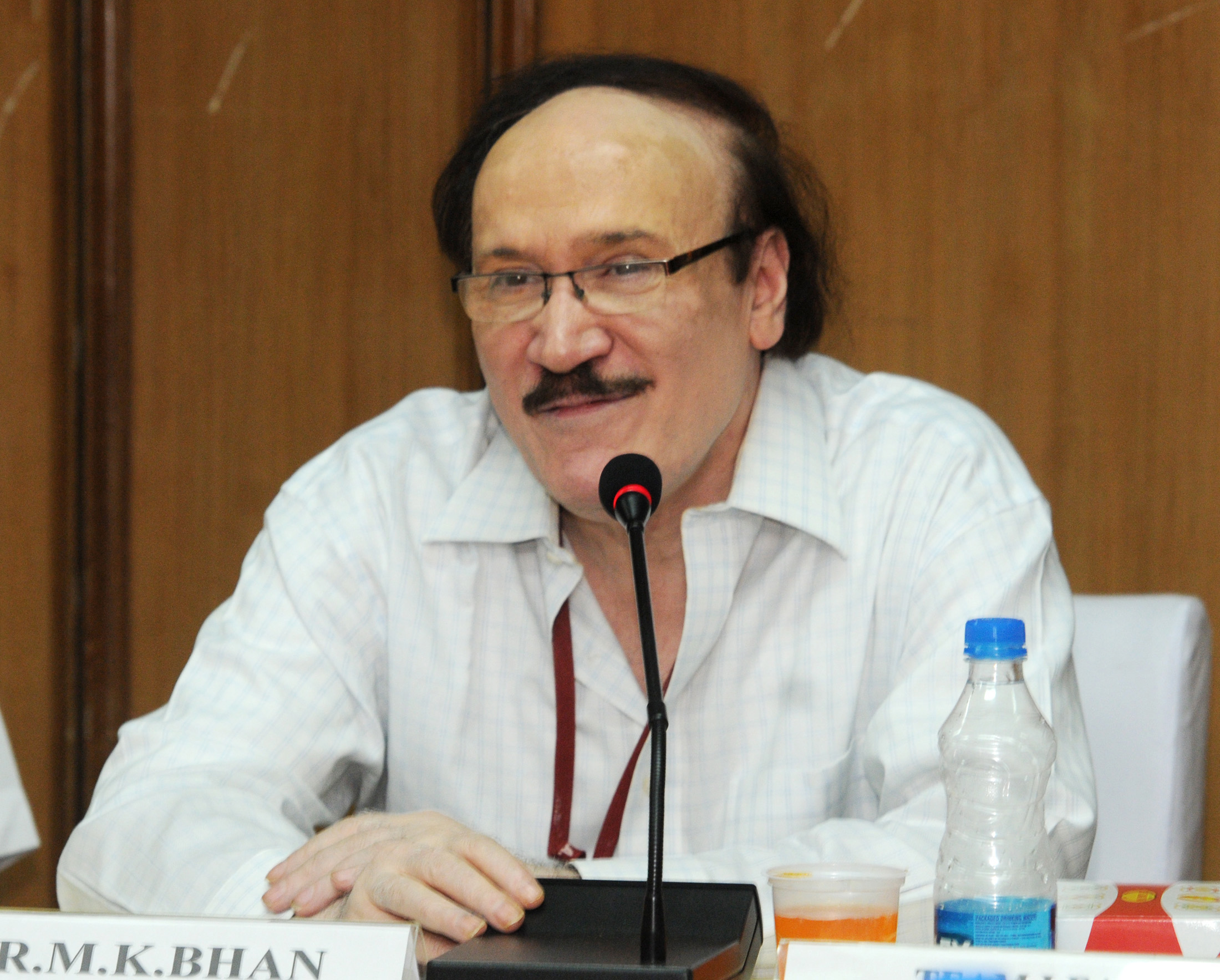
- M. K. Bhan addressing a Press Conference to apprise on the two significant R&D results emanating from DBT support, in New Delhi on May 31, 2012.
- Born: 9 November 1947; Kashmir, India
- Died: 26 January 2020 (aged 72)
- Education: Armed Forces Medical College, Pune; Post Graduate Institute of Medical Education and Research, Chandigarh
- Scientific career
- Fields: Medical Science
- Workplaces: Department of Biotechnology

Maharaj Kishan Bhan (9 November 1947 – 26 January 2020) was an Indian pediatrician and clinical scientist. He received M.B.B.S. Degree (1969) from Armed Forces Medical College, Pune and M.D. Degree from Post Graduate Institute of Medical Education and Research, Chandigarh. He carried out extensive post doctoral research at All India Institute of Medical Sciences in the areas of diarrheal diseases and child nutrition with an emphasis on public health issues. He served as the president of the Jawaharlal Nehru Institute of Postgraduate Medical Education & Research (JIPMER).

He was known for developing Rota Viral Vaccine in collaboration with Bharat Biotech International. He was positioned as Secretary, Department of Biotechnology, Government of India, until 2012. Bhan conceived the newly formed BIRAC, which is expected to result in product development by industry in collaboration with academia. This initiative is to boost product development in the country. For this Bhan was actively assisted by Renu Swarup and Ravi Dhar from BIRAC. An elected fellow of the National Academy of Medical Sciences, he was awarded in 1990 the Shanti Swarup Bhatnagar Prize for Science and Technology, the highest science award in India, in the Medical Sciences category. He held honorary Doctor of Science and was responsible for policy formulation and was Member of the Jury for nearly all major national science awards awarded by the Government of India.

== Prizes and honours ==
- Genome Valley Excellence Award — BIO ASIA (2013)
- Padmabhushan for civil services - 2013.
- Biotech Product and Process Development and Commercialization Award - 2003
- Shanti Swarup Bhatnagar Prize for Science and Technology - 1990
- National Ranbaxy Award - 1990
- S.S. Mishra Award of the National Academy of Medical Sciences - 1986
- ST Achar Gold Medal of the Indian Academy of Pediatrics - 1984
