= Hussein Al-Ali Hospital =

Hospital in Hofuf, Saudi Arabia

Coordinates: 25.39358°N 49.60426°E

- Hussein Al-Ali Medical Group
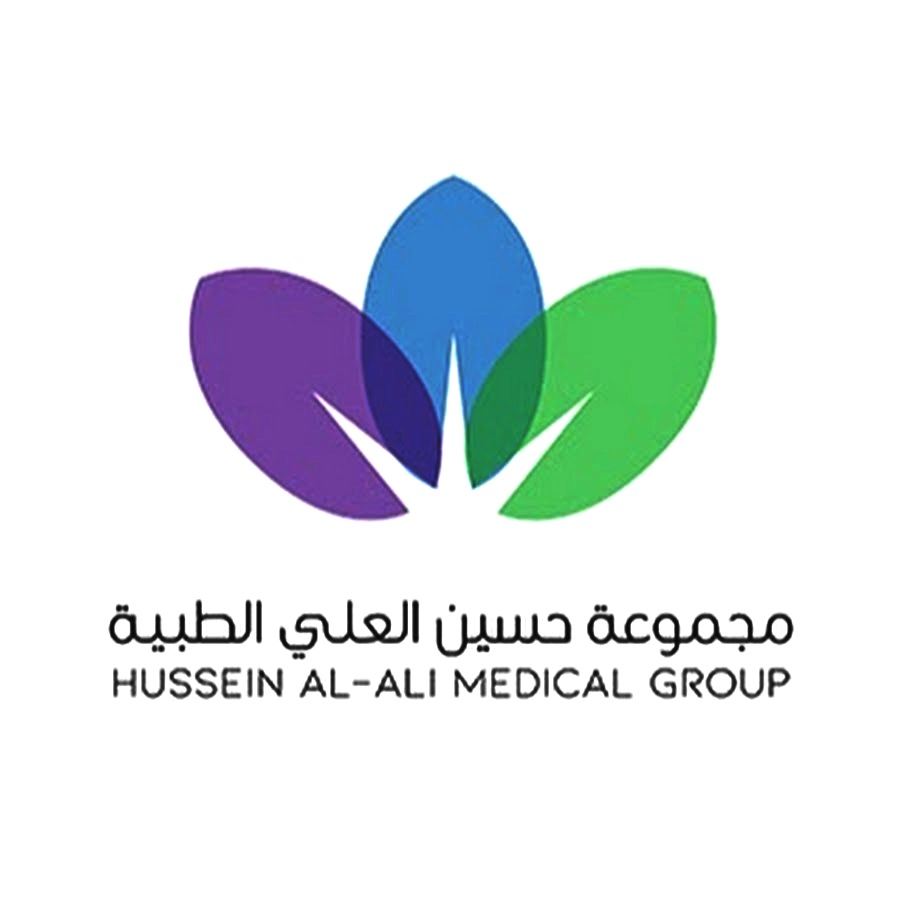

Geography
- Location: Al-Ahsa, Saudi Arabia

Services
- Standards: JCI accreditation (2020) | HAH CBAHI accreditation (2019)

History
- Opened: February 2012

Links
- Website: https://alalimedical.com/hospital/
- Lists: Hospitals in Saudi Arabia

Hussein Al-Ali Hospital (HAH) is a private healthcare facility owned by the Hussein Al-Ali Medical Group and located in Al-Ahsa, in the Eastern Province of Saudi Arabia.

== History ==
Hussein Al-Ali Hospital was opened on 28 February 2012, under the patronage of Saudi Prince Badr bin Muhammad bin Abdullah bin Jalawi Al Saud, the governor of Al-Ahsa. At its opening, the hospital's first phase comprised 50 beds in a three-storey building, with nine outpatient clinics, three operating rooms, neonatal care facilities, five dialysis units and four intensive care units.

The hospital has tertiary care facilities and has been JCI-Accredited since December 2016. The hospital was re-accredited in 2020.

In 2019, CBAHI (Central Board for the Accreditation of Healthcare Institutions) awarded accreditation to HAH for its compliance with the established National Standards for hospitals.

== Partnerships ==
In 2019, the hospital was the medical partner of Al-Adalah football club. Newly signed players underwent medical examinations at the hospital while injured players were referred there for diagnostic imaging.

== See also ==
- List of hospitals in Saudi Arabia
- Health care in Saudi Arabia
- Health in Saudi Arabia
