= King Saud Medical City =

Coordinates: 24°37′40″N 46°41′25″E

King Saud Medical City مدينة الملك سعود الطبية
- Ministry of Health

Geography
- Location: Riyadh, Al Riyadh, Ar Riyadh, Saudi Arabia

Organisation
- Care system: Public
- Type: District General, Teaching
- Affiliated university: King Saud University; Imam Muhammad bin Saud Islamic University; Princess Nora bint Abdul Rahman University; Dar Al Uloom University

Services
- Standards: Accreditation from International Joint Commission (JCI) obtained on 23 Jan 2013
- Emergency department: Level I Trauma Center
- Beds: 1500

History
- Former names: Riyadh Central Hospital; Riyadh Medical Complex; King Saud Medical Complex
- Founded: 13 Oct 1956

Links
- Website: www.ksmc.med.sa
- Lists: Hospitals in Saudi Arabia

King Saud Medical City (KSMC), also known as Al-Shemaisi Hospital, is a large public district general hospital and Level 1 Trauma Center in Riyadh, Saudi Arabia. It was founded in 1956 and is one of the largest tertiary care centers in Saudi Arabia. KSMC is the medical city within Riyadh First Health Cluster, one of the regional health clusters operated through the state-owned Health Holding Company. The institution is listed as having 1400 ward beds, 199 critical care beds, and more than 8,000 employees. The 102-bed emergency department is the busiest in the country, and the hospital serves as the largest referral center in Saudi Arabia for Orthopedic surgery, Trauma surgery and Neurosurgery. The hospital has a high patient turnover, both outpatient and inpatient, and conducted over 20,000 surgical procedures in 2019 alone.

KSMC is also one of the largest medical education, training and research centers in Saudi Arabia, with postgraduate residency and specialist training programs in medicine and surgical subspecialties as well as multiple medical school affiliations.

The medical complex itself houses the General Hospital, as well as the Pediatric Hospital, Maternity Hospital, Dental Center and the King Fahad Charity Kidney Center. KSMC's core competencies are Emergency Care, Trauma, Orthopedics, Burn Care, Bariatric Surgery, Dental Care and Critical Care.

== History ==
King Saud Medical City traces its origins to King Saud I Hospital, which was established in the Al-Shumaisi district of Riaydh in November 1956. During the following five decades, the institutions was successively known as Riyadh Central Hospital, Riyadh Medical Complex, and King Saud Medical Complex, before adopting its present name, King Saud Medical City, in November 2010. Despite these official changes, it has continued to be widely known locally as Al-Shumaisi Hospital.

The hospital was inaugurated during the reign of King Saud bin Abdulaziz and initially comprised an emergency department, together with departments of internal medicine, general surgery, orthopaedics, obstetrics and gynaecology, paediatrics, laboratory medicine, pharmacy, and immunisation.

The institution expanded steadily during the following decades. Outpatient clinics opened in 1962, followed by a central laboratory and blood bank in 1963. Dedicated women's and maternity, and children's hospitals were established in 1969, transferring those services from the original hospital into separate facilities. Later additions included a physical therapy department in 1973, specialist renal services in 1976, and a dental centre in 1984.

In 1992, the General Hospital, the Women's and Maternity Hospital, and the Children's Hospital were reorganised under a unified administration known as the Riyadh Medical Complex. The King Fahad Kidney Centre was subsequently established in 2001.

During the 2000s, the Ministry of Health undertook a major redevelopment programme that replaced many of the original low-rise buildings with new hospital towers and specialist facilities. The redevelopment included a medical tower, outpatient clinics, an expanded King Fahad Kidney Centre, a dental centre, and an academic tower. The medical, academic, and administrative buildings were officially opened on 29 January 2008 by His Royal Highness Price Salman bin Abdulaziz.

In November 2010, its name was officially changed from King Saud Medical Complex to King Saud Medical City following approval by King Abdullah bin Abdulaziz. According to the Ministry of Health, the new designation reflected the institution's redevelopment from a hospital complex into a medical city comprising multiple hospitals, specialist centres, and academic facilities. In January 2013, the hospital received accreditation from Joint Commission International (JCI).

In 2015, KSMC's intensive care service comprised six intensive care units with a combined capacity of 129 beds. The first modern intensive care unit (ICU) in Saudi Arabia was set up in KSMC, and the hospital currently has one of the most highly specialized intensive care units in the region. KSMC's ICU is considered one of the largest in the world.

KSMC and Melbourne's Alfred Hospital entered into a collaboration to develop advanced trauma services in 2017. The services included specialist training, a trauma registry, and research programmes supporting the establishment of a Level 1 Trauma Centre.The resulting TraumA Registry has subsequently been used in comparative trauma research.

In 2018, the hospital began a digital transformation process, which was accelerated during the COVID-19 pandemic through the introduction of virtual consultations and digital clinical records.

In 2020, KSMC introduced nine digital operating theaters, including hybrid operating rooms integrating conventional surgery with interventional radiology and robotic surgery.

As of 2021 it employed 9,200 healthcare personnel. The original building remained as the General Hospital, and new buildings included Medical Towers 1 and 2, the Regional Laboratory, and the Academic Tower. The Academic Tower contains a medical library, a medical training centre, and a lecture theatre accommodating approximately 500 people.

In April 2025, a new 500-bed Maternity and Children Tower was inaugurated as part of the medical city's continued redevelopment. In the same year, KSMC was ranked 113th globally in the Brand Finance ranking of the top 250 academic medical centers.

== See also ==
- List of hospitals in Saudi Arabia
- List of things named after Saudi kings
- King Faisal Specialist Hospital and Research Centre
