= Neelam Kler =

Indian neonatologist

- Born: Srinagar, Jammu and Kashmir, India
- Occupations: Neonatologist, pediatrician
- Awards: Padma Bhushan

Neelam Kler is an Indian neonatologist, known for her pioneering work on neonatal intensive care and ventilation. She is credited with developing neonatal care to better the survival rate of extremely tiny preterm babies (less than 1000 grams) to 90 percent. The Government of India honoured her with the third-highest civilian award, Padmabhushan, in 2014, for her services to the fields of medicine and neonatology.

== Biography ==
Neelam Kler was born in Srinagar, in the state of Jammu and Kashmir in India and had her schooling in the Presentation Convent School in Srinagar. Opting for the medical profession, she obtained a master's degree in Paediatrics from the Postgraduate Institute of Medical Sciences and Research, (PIGMER) Chandigarh and continued there for further training in neonatology. Later, she went to Copenhagen, Denmark, on a fellowship in neonatology from the Copenhagen University for advanced studies on the subject.

== Professional career ==
After returning from Copenhagen, Kler started her professional career in India by joining Sir Ganga Ram Hospital, New Delhi, on 31 May 1988. During a career spanning 26 years, Kler launched the department of neonatology at the hospital, presently holding the position of the Chairperson.

She has also worked as a visiting consultant at King Fahd University Hospital, Gizan, Saudi Arabia and as a fellow in neonatology at the Milwaukee Children Hospital, Wisconsin, USA.

Presently she holds the following offices:

- President of the National Neonatology Forum.
- Advisor on CNAG (Cell of Nutrition Advisory Group) on line service on Nutrition queries.
- Editor -'Journal of Neonatology a quarterly journal published by National Neonatology Forum.
- Organising Chairperson of FAOPS (Federation of Asia and Oceania Perinatal Societies) 2010
- Member – WHO Expert Committee on prevention of birth defects in South East Asia.
- Master trainer, American Academy of Pediatrics – Baby's Breath assistance.
- Member – Global Neonatal Nutrition Consensus Group for the development of international guidelines on feeding the preterm infants

She has, at various points, collaborated with United Nations International Children's Emergency Fund, and World Health Organization, on various matters related to neonatological care. She is also a panel member of the Newborn and child health strategy of the Ministry of Health and Family Welfare.

On the social front, Dr. Kler chairs the Health Care at ALL Ladies League.

== Legacy ==
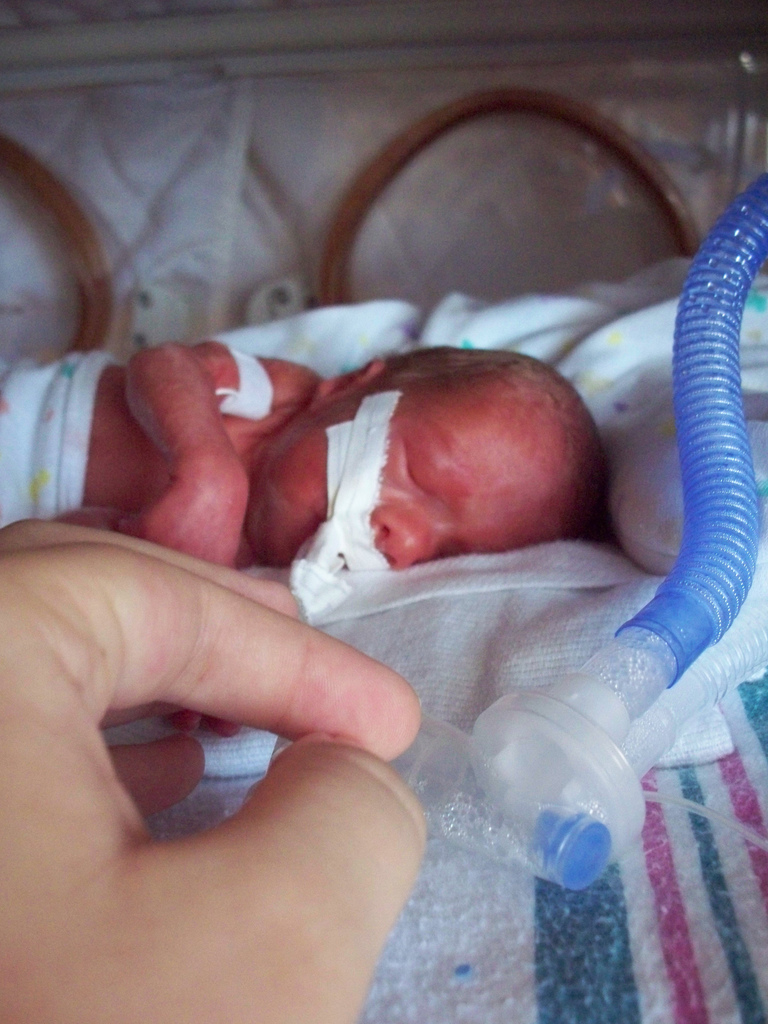
Premature infant in ventilator

Neelam Kler is known for the development of neonatal care, especially the care of preterm babies, is considered a pioneer in intensive care and ventilation. She is credited with developing the department of neonatology at Sir Ganga Ram Hospital, New Delhi to a state of the art facility with modern high frequency ventilation with Nitric Oxide delivery and bedside cerebral function monitoring. Statistical data has shown that, under Dr. Kler, the survival rate of preterm babies, weighing less than 1000 grams, have improved to 90 per cent and the infection rate was brought down to 9.8 per 1000 inpatients.

She has also contributed in initiating a three-year doctoral program in neonatology by the National Board of Examinations.

== Awards and recognitions ==
- Padmabhushan – 2014 – the sole recipient for medicine category to be awarded in 2014.

== Publications ==
Neelam Kler has published several articles in national and international books on paediatrics, some of them are:

- Meconium Aspiration Syndrome (MAS), in collaboration with Pankaj Garg, in Recent Advances in Paediatrics
- Auditory Neuropathy Spectrum Disorder in Late Preterm and Term infants with Severe Jaundice with Satish Saluja, Asha Agarwal and Sanjiv Amin
- Chapter 011 Follow-up of Preterm Baby with Anita Singh
- Chapter-004 Parenteral Nutrition in Neonatal Intensive Care Unit with Choudhury Vivek and Navin Gupta
- Chapter-62 Neonatal Transport with Sony Arun and Navin Gupta
- Chapter-005 Parenteral Nutrition in Newborn with Sony Arun
- Chapter-64 Neonatal Respiratory Disorders with Sony Arun and Satish Saluja
- Selected Macro/Micronutrient Needs of the Routine Preterm Infant with Jatinder Bhatia, Ian Griffin, Diane Anderson and Magnus Domelleof

== See also ==
- Pediatrics
- Preterm birth
- American Academy of Pediatrics
- King Fahd University Hospital
- Sir Ganga Ram Hospital (India)
