= Prince Sultan Military Medical City =

Coordinates: 24°41′N 46°42′E

Geography
- Location: Riyadh, Saudi Arabia

Organisation
- Care system: Public
- Type: District General, Military

Services
- Standards: JCI
- Emergency department: Yes
- Beds: 1,192

History
- Founded: 1978

Links
- Website: https://www.psmmc.med.sa
- Other links: List of hospitals in Saudi Arabia

Prince Sultan Military Medical City (PSMMC), formerly known as Riyadh Military Hospital, is a military medical complex located in Riyadh, the capital of Saudi Arabia. It is approximately 20 kilometres (12 mi) from the city centre and easily accessible to the general population. PSMMC is part of the Medical Services Department (MSD) of the Ministry of Defense (MOD).

== History ==
Riyadh Military Hospital was opened by King Khalid bin Abdulaziz in 1978 with an initial capacity of 385 beds, to meet the needs of capital city, Riyadh. The hospital subsequently expanded beyond the main Riyadh facility. At the end of 1979, Al Kharj Military Industries Corporation Hospital was initiated and included 60 beds, followed in 1983 by a 34-bed facility at King Abdulaziz Military College Hospital.

Further expansion included additional facilities and buildings, as well as a network of 20 dispensaries across the Riyadh metropolitan area and support for three dispensaries operated by the Medical Service Department.

By 2011, the complex was reported to have 1,192 beds, including accident and emergency, delivery, neonatal intensive care, and operating theatre capacity, together with 48 dialysis chairs and 7,179 staff. In January 2010, iCT Health announced an agreement with Riyadh Military Hospital to introduce a web-based electronic medical records system, described at the time as the first implementation of its kind in the region. It also provided support to the Prince Sultan Cardiac Centre.

== Medical specialties ==
The following are the medical specialty departments at PSMMC

- Psychiatry
- Endoscopy
- Otorhinolaryngology, Head & Neck Surgery
- Pathology
- Radiology
- Ophthalmology

== Mission ==
The Hospital Management is committed to providing a high standard of healthcare services for its patients by

- meeting the expectations of its patients and workers
- fully committing to the principles of Total Quality Management
- providing the optimum support to all employees through effective training
- improving the efficiecty of management operations
- ensuring a culture of continuous improvement

== Achievements ==
Riyadh Military Hospital received numerous accolades in the fields of health and medical science. It is the first hospital in Saudi Arabia to have published more than 1600 research articles and has trained more than 1017 physicians and 577 paramedics. It is the first-ever renal transplantation centre in Saudi Arabia where more than 750 kidney transplants have occurred since its inception and it is the only bone marrow transplantation centre in Saudi Arabia operating since 1989. RMH is the first hospital to have conducted a liver transplant, Stereotactic Radio-surgery, and computer operated surgery. Epilepsy treatment and surgery at Riyadh Military hospital was started in 1998 and it is the second-largest referral program and management in Saudi Arabia.

In its academic programmes, there are more than 33 fellowship programs, 238 physicians in training, approximately 20 diploma programs, and 136 trainees.

== Programs ==
- Health Care Students
  - Nursing critical care diploma
- Nursing Academy
  - Post Graduate Critical Care Diploma
  - Nursing Diploma Program
  - Staff development program
- Medical Studies
  - Residency in Medicine
  - Residency in Surgery
  - Residency in Dentistry
  - Residency in Emergency Medicine
  - Residency in Obstetrics and Gynnaecology
  - Residency in Orthopedics
  - Residency in Pediatrics
  - Residency in Plastic Surgery
  - Residency in Psychiatry
  - Residency in Urology
  - Residency in Histopathology
  - Residency in Neurosurgery

== See also ==
- Health care in Saudi Arabia
- List of hospitals in Saudi Arabia
