= Ohud Hospital =

Geography
- Location: Al salam Road, Medina, Saudi Arabia
- Coordinates: 24.470550°N 39.546979°E

Organisation
- Network: Madinah Health Cluster, Ministry of Health

Services
- Standards: Training Centre (approved 2022), Baby-Friendly Accreditation (2025)

History
- Former name: Badr Al-Khairi until 1409
- Opened: 1405 AH

Links
- Lists: Hospitals in Saudi Arabia

Ohud Hospital is a 280-bed government general hospital in the outskirts of Madinah Al Munawwara, Saudi Arabia and forms part of the Madinah Health Cluster. It is located adjacent to the large air conditioning and electricity complex that supplies Masjid Al-Nabawi. The campus was opened in Safar 1405 AH as a charity hospital called Badr Al-Khairi before being renamed Ohud Hospital in 1409 AH. An identical campus is also located on the outskirts of Madinah.

Since its establishment, its facilities have expanded through the addition of specialised services and a major redevelopment programme launched in 2022. It contains a residential campus where the hospital doctors reside. Nurses' quarters are also located on site. The hospital also serves as a regional referral centre for ophthalmology and otolaryngology and is accredited by the Saudi Commission for Health Specialties as a training centre.

== History ==
The hospital opened in Safar 1405 AH (approximately October 1984 CE) as a charity hospital known as Badr Al-Khairi. It was renamed Ohud Hospital in 1409 AH (approximately 19889-1989).

In March 2013, the hospital opened a dedicated day-surgery centre with 13 inpatient beds, four operating rooms, a recovery room, and supporting clinical departments, expanding its surgical facilities. In 2014, the specialist otolaryngological (ear nose and throat (ENT)) services were expanded with the introduction of magnetic bone-anchored hearing implant (Cochlear BAHA Attract) surgery.

In 2020, a major redevelopment programme was announced. The two-year infrastructure replacement and redevelopment project was launched by Madinah Health Cluster in 2022, valued at SAR 106 million ($29 million). During the first phases of the project, paediatric, obstetric and gynaecological, ophthalmological, and otolaryngological services continued at Ohud Hospital, while other services were transferred to hospitals elsewhere in Medina.

In December 2022, the Saudi Commission for Health Specialties granted the hospital institutional accreditation as an approved training centre.

In July 2025, the hospital received Baby-friendly accreditation following an assessment of its implementation of standards associated with the WHO-UNICEF Baby-friendly Hospital Initiative.

== Organisation ==
Ohud Hospital is a government general hospital operated as part of the Madinah Health Cluster, one of Saudi Arabia's regional healthcare networks established under the national health sector transformation programme. The cluster integrates hospitals and primary healthcare centres across the Medina region under a single administrative structure intended to coordinate service delivery.

== See also ==
- List of hospitals in Saudi Arabia
