= Magrabi Hospitals and Centers =

Magrabi Hospitals & Centers, founded in 1955, started as an eye hospital in Jeddah, Saudi Arabia. It was the first private specialized facility in the Middle East and Africa. It became the largest and first sub-specialized medical care network in the region, providing eye care to more than 1,000,000 patients and performing more than 100,000 sight-preserving surgeries annually.

In the late 1970s, Magrabi acquired ENT and Dentistry practices.

In 1997, Magrabi Hospitals & Centers went into partnership with AMI Saudi Arabia Limited.

In 2009, IFC, a member of the World Bank Group, has partnered with Magrabi Hospitals & Centers to expand private eye care in MENA region, to address the need for ophthalmology services, and to bring clinical and patient care to underdeveloped markets in the region.

Magrabi Hospitals & Centers operates in nine countries in the Middle East & Africa. It has 32 hospitals and centers, 8 of which are charitable, 300 physicians and 600 nurses. The facilities host 40 operating theaters.

== See also ==
- List of hospitals in Saudi Arabia
