= List of hospitals in Saudi Arabia =

This is a list of hospitals in Saudi Arabia. There are a total of 504 hospitals as of 2020. 287 of these hospitals are under the direction of the Ministry of Health. Another 50 hospitals are run by other governmental organizations. The remaining 167 hospitals are privately operated.

== Mecca ==
- King Abdullah Medical City (KAMC) - Mecca

The estimated $1.4bn King Abdullah Medical City (KAMC) is the third referral specialist medical city in the country after King Fahd Medical City in Riyadh and King Fahd Specialist Hospital in Dammam. The area of the KAMC is 800,000m². The accommodation capacity of the five-storey building is 1,500 beds, of which 500 have been allotted to the specialist referral hospital. Al Rajhi Holding Group, China State, Construction, El Seif and Saudi Binladin Group have all entered the prequalification stage. The scope of work includes a cardiac centre (150 beds), a centre for specialised surgery and organ transplantation (100 beds), and a centre for cancer treatment and surgical oncology (200 beds). The project's consultants are RTKL/Saudi Diyar Consultants

- Al Baraka Polyclinic, Al Biban, Mecca (https://www.albarakapolyclinic.com) (Location: https://g.co/kgs/2Cz6XEi])
- Al Baraka Polyclinic, Al Shouqiya, Mecca
- Al-Adwani General Hospital - Mecca
- Abeer Medical Center - Mecca
- Saudi National Hospital Managed by Abeer Medical group - Mecca (First private hospital in KSA)
- AL-Noor Specialized Hospital - Mecca
- Makkah Medical Center - Mecca
- Heraa General Hospital - Mecca
- Abeer Medical Center - Taif- Opening soon

== Madinah ==
- King Faisal Specialist Hospital and Research Center - Madinah
- Abeer Medical center - Medina
- King Abdulaziz Hospital - Medina
- King Fahd Hospital - Medina
- Al-Dar Hospital - Medina
- Ohud Hospital - Medina
- Prince Mohammed bin Abdulazeez Hospital (NGHA) - Medina
- Al-Zahra Hospital - Medina

== Tabuk ==
- North West Armed Forces Hospital - Tabuk
- King Fahad Specialist Hospital, Tabuk

== Riyadh ==
- Al-Adwani General Hospital-Riyadh
- Image Dental Clinic] - Riyadh
- Abeer Medical Center - Riyadh
- Al Jazeera Hospital - Riyadh
- Prince Mohammad Bin Abdul Aziz Hospital - Riyadh
- King Salman Bin Abdulaziz Hospital - Riyadh
- King Saud Medical City - Riyadh
- Prince Sultan Military Medical City - Riyadh
- King Fahd Medical City - Riyadh
- King Faisal Specialist Hospital & Research Center - Riyadh
- King Abdulaziz Medical City - Riyadh
- King Khalid University Hospital - Riyadh
- King Abdulaziz University Hospital - Riyadh
- King Khalid Eye Specialist Hospital - Riyadh
- Security Forces Hospital - Riyadh
- Al Iman General Hospital - Riyadh
- Al Yamama Hospital - Riyadh
- Dallah Hospital - Riyadh
- Green Crescent Hospital - Riyadh
- Specialized Medical Center Hospital - Riyadh
- Saudi German Hospital - Riyadh
- Dr.Sulaiman Al-Habib Medical Complex in Olaya - Riyadh
- Dr.Sulaiman Al-Habib hospital in Arrayan - Riyadh
- Dr.Sulaiman Al-Habib hospital in Al Takhassusi - Riyadh
- Magrabi Eye, Ear & Dental Hospital - Riyadh
- Olaya Medical Center - Riyadh
- Obeid Specialized Hospital - Riyadh
- Oxyhealth Clinics - Riyadh
- Kingdom Hospital - Riyadh
- Riyadh Care Hospital - Riyadh
- Riyadh Central Hospital - Riyadh
- Riyadh National Hospital - Riyadh
- Dr. Abanamy Hospital - Riyadh
- Al Hammadi Hospital] - Riyadh
- Al Mashary Hospital - Riyadh
- Al Mowasat Hospital - Riyadh
- Wadi ad-Dawasir Hospital - Wadi ad-Dawasir
- Armed forces Hospital - Wadi ad-Dawasir
- Jarir Medical Centre Riyadh (KMCR) - Riyadh
- Imam Abdul Rehman al Faisal Hospital - Riyadh
- AlOsrah International Hospital (OIH) - Riyadh
- Mouwasat Hospital - Riyadh
- Best Health Center for Home Medical Care-Riyadh

== Jeddah ==
- Al-Adwani General Hospital - Jeddah
- Abeer Medical Center - Jeddah
- Abuzinadah Hospital - Jeddah
- Abdul Latif Jameel Hospital - Jeddah
- Al-Amal Hospital (Ministry of Health) Drug Abuse Rehabilitation Facility - Jeddah
- Al-Hamra Hospital - Jeddah
- Al- Hayat Hospital - Jeddah
- Al-Jedaani Hospital - Jeddah
- Al-Magrebi Hospital - Jeddah
- Al-Mostaqbal Hospital - Jeddah
- Al-Mousat Hospital - Jeddah
- Al-Salama Hospital - Jeddah
- Al-Thagher Hospital (Ministry of Health) - Jeddah
- King Fahd Armed forces Hospital - Jeddah
- Bugshan Hospital - Jeddah
- Dr. Bakhsh Hospital - Jeddah
- Dr. Daghistani Hospital - Jeddah
- Dr. Erfan & Bagedo General Hospital - Jeddah
- Dr. Ghassan N Pharaon General Hospital (GNP) - Jeddah
- Dr. Hassan A. Ghazzawi Hospital - Jeddah
- Dr. Khalid Idriss Hospital - Jeddah
- Dr. Samir Abbas Hospital - Jeddah
- Dr. Suleiman Fakeeh Hospital - Jeddah
- Eye Hospital (Ministry of Health) - Jeddah
- Hai Al Jamea Hospital - Jeddah
- International Medical Center (IMC) - Jeddah
- Jeddah Clinic Hospital, Kandarah - Jeddah
- Jeddah National Hospital - Jeddah
- King Abdulaziz Hospital & Oncology Centre (Ministry of Health) - Jeddah
- King abdulaziz University Hospital - Jeddah
- King Abdullah Medical Complex - Jeddah
- King Fahad Hospital - Jeddah
- King Faisal Specialist Hospital - Jeddah
- Magrabi Hospitals and Centers
- Maternity & Children Hospital - Jeddah
- New Al-Jedaani Hospital - Jeddah
- Saudi American Hospital - Jeddah
- Saudi German Hospital - SGH Group - Jeddah
- Dr Hala Essa Binladin Hospital - Jeddah
- International Medical Center (IMC) - Jeddah
- AlMashfa Hospital - Jeddah
- Shifa Jeddah Polyclinic, Sharafiyya Jeddah

== Eastern Province ==
- Arrawdah General Hospital
- Clinic 9 Medical Center - Mohammediyah, Al Khaleej Road, Dammam.
- Abeer Medical Center - Dammam
- Almana General Hospital - Khobar
- Almana General Hospital - Dammam
- Healthcare Polyclinic - Dammam
- Almana General Hospital - Hofuf
- Al Ahsa Hospital - Hofuf
- Prince Saud Bin Jalawi Hospital - Hofuf
- Almana General Hospital - Jubail
- Al-Sadiq Hospital - Sayhat
- Al-Yousif Hospital - Khobar
- As-Salama Hospital - Khobar
- Badr Al Rabie Dispensary - Dammam
- Dar As Sihha Medical Center - Dammam
- Dammam Central Hospital - Dammam
- Dr. Fakhry and Al Rajhi Hospital - Khobar
- Erfan Hospital - Seyed Gholamreza fanaee
- Gama Hospital (astoon)- Khobar
- Hussein Al-Ali Hospital - Hofuf
- Johns Hopkins Aramco Healthcare - Khobar
- Mouwasat Hospital - Qatif
- Mouwasat Hospital - Dammam
- Mouwasat Hospital - Khobar
- Mouwasat Hospital - Jubail
- King Fahad Specialist Hospital Dammam - Dammam
- King Fahd University Hospital - Khobar
- King Fahd Military Medical Complex - Dhahran
- Mohammad Dossary Hospital (MDH) - Khobar
- Procare Riaya Hospital - Khobar
- Qatif Central Hospital – Qatif
- Al Bati Medical Center – Qatif
- Dar Afia Medical Center – Dammam
- Tadawi General Hospital
- Sigma Diagnostics - Dammam
- Dar Afia Medical Center Khobar – Khobar
- Dar Afia Medical Clinic Airport Branch – King Fahd International Airport
- Shifa Al Khobar Medical Center - Khobar

== Al-Qassim Province ==
- Al Fereh Hospital - Buraydah
- Qassim Armed Forces Hospital (QAFH) - Buraidah
- King Fahad Specialist Hospital - Buraidah
- Life Clinic - Buraidah
- Buraidah Central Hospital - Buraidah
- Buraidah Maternal and Children Hospital - Buraidah
- Bukayriyah General Hospital - Bukayriyah
- Buraidah Psychological Health Hospital - Buraidah
- Dr.Sulaiman Al Habib Hospital - Buraidah
- King Saud Hospital - Unaizah
- Al Wafaa Hospital - Unaizah
- Ar Rass General Hospital - Ar Rass
- Azzayed Hospital - Ar Rass
- Al Midhnab General Hospital - Al Midhnab
- Salamat Hospital - Ha'il
- Maternity And Children's Hospital (MCH) - Buraidah

== Southern Region ==
- King Fahad Hospital - Al Bahah
- Abeer Medical Center - Khamis Mushait- Opening soon
- Asir Central Hospital - Abha
- Abha General Hospital - Abha
- Abha private Hospital - Abha
- The Saudi German Hospital - Abha
- Al-Rahma Hospital - Abha
- Armed forces Hospital Southern Region - Khamis Mushait
- Al-Zafer Hospital - Najran
- Alwaseet Medical Complex. - Jizan City

== Other regions ==
- Abeer Al Noor Medical center - Hail
- Al Hassan General Hospital - Ta'if
- Royal Commission Medical Center - Yanbu
- Dr. Sameer Ibrahim Saeedi General Hospital - Yanbu
- Yanbu National Hospital - Yanbu
- Yanbu General Hospital - Yanbu
- Al Ansari Specialist Hospital - Yanbu
- Taif Maternity Hospital - Ta'if
- Al Hada & Taif Military Hospitals - Ta'if
- King Faisal Hospital - Ta'if
- Dr. Noor Mohd Khan General Hospital - Hafar al-Batin
- King Abdul Aziz Specialist Hospital (KAASH) - Ta'if
- Al Adwani General hospital (AAGH) - Ta'if

== See also ==
- Health care in Saudi Arabia
