= King Fahd Mosque =

King Fahd Mosque or King Fahad Mosque may refer to:

- King Fahd Mosque (Edinburgh) or Edinburgh Central Mosque, Scotland
- King Fahd Mosque (Sarajevo), Bosnia and Herzegovina
- King Fahad Mosque (Culver City, California), U.S.
- King Fahd Islamic Cultural Center, Buenos Aires, Argentina
- Ibrahim-al-Ibrahim Mosque, also known as the King Fahd bin Abdulaziz al-Saud Mosque, Gibraltar
- King Fahd Mosque (Riyadh)
- King Fahad Mosque (Banjul)

== See also ==
- King Fahd (disambiguation)
