= King Faisal Specialist Hospital and Research Centre =

King Faisal Specialist Hospital and Research Centre مستشفى الملك فيصل التخصصي ومركز الأبحاث

Geography
- Location: Riyadh, Saudi Arabia
- Coordinates: 24°40′18″N 46°40′29″E

Organisation
- Care system: Hybrid
- Type: Specialist
- Affiliated university: Alfaisal University

Services
- Standards: JCAHO/JCI/CBAHI
- Emergency department: Level II trauma center
- Speciality: Organ transplant and oncology

Helipads
- Helipad: Available

History
- Founded: 1975

Links
- Website: www.kfshrc.edu.sa

The King Faisal Specialist Hospital and Research Centre (Arabic: مستشفى الملك فيصل التخصصي ومركز الأبحاث; KFSH) is a non-profit tertiary healthcare institution headquartered in Riyadh, Saudi Arabia.

== Overview ==
As a tertiary referral hospital, it offers primary and specialized inpatient and outpatient medical care and participates in clinical research studies. The hospital is known for providing treatments in oncology, organ transplantation, cardiovascular medicine, and genomics. It operates hospitals in Riyadh, Jeddah and Madinah together with a virtual care centre, and reports a combined capacity of about 2,450 beds and a workforce of more than 17,000 people drawn from over 60 nationalities. In 2024, it was ranked 229th globally and 2nd in the Middle East by Newsweek. It placed 209th globally in Newsweek's 2025 ranking, when Arab News reported it as the only hospital from an Arab or African country on the list, and 153rd in 2026.

Newsweek's Best Specialized Hospitals Middle East 2026 ranking listed Riyadh first in the region in oncology and orthopaedics, second in cardiology, gastroenterology and neurology, and fifth in paediatrics, while Jeddah was ranked in all six specialties.

== History ==
KFSH was established in 1970 by King Faisal on land he donated for the hospital. The donated site covered approximately 450,000 square metres. The hospital was officially inaugurated in 1975 by King Khalid. KFSH began operations, initially with a capacity of 17 beds.

The hospital established its Organ Transplant Program in 1981 when the first kidney transplant was performed at the institute. In 1984, KFSH performed its first HSCT and was the first HSCT center in the World Health Organization Eastern Mediterranean Region to perform the procedure. In 1989, the hospital conducted its first heart transplant.

Other early milestones recorded by the hospital include the first cardiac surgical centre in Saudi Arabia, developed with a team from Baylor College of Medicine; the introduction of HLA testing for transplantation and accreditation by the College of American Pathologists, which KFSH describes as the first in Asia; the creation of Academic and Research Affairs; and the launch in 1981 of the journal now published as the Annals of Saudi Medicine.

From 1973 to 1985, the hospital was administered by the Hospital Corporation of America (HCA). HCA was awarded the contract in 1973 to staff, commission and manage the hospital, its first international contract, under an agreement signed with Saudi Arabia that year, and United States court records describe the arrangement as running for at least sixteen years from 1973. In 1985, following a Royal Decree, the contract with HCA ended and the responsibility for the administration and operation of the hospital's premises was undertaken by a national team.

During the 1990s, KFSH introduced new areas of healthcare, including a colorectal unit in 1990 and a national home healthcare program in 1991. The outpatient building began operations in 1995. The King Fahd National Centre for Children's Cancer (KFNCCCR) at KFSH was established in 1997 to provide specialized care for pediatric oncology and hematology patients.

KFSH Jeddah was established in 2000. In 2007 the hospital opened the first bone bank in Saudi Arabia, which became the first national bone bank serving the Ministry of Health the following year. The King Abdullah Center for Oncology and Liver Diseases at KFSH Riyadh began operations in 2017, a 23-floor building with 300 beds, and the Madinah hospital, previously Al-Miqat Hospital, was transferred to KFSH in 2018 by order of King Salman and opened as a KFSH branch in 2021.

In 2020, the Centre for Genomic Medicine was established for research and personalized treatment of genetic diseases. It is one of a group of centres of excellence created in a restructuring around 2019 and 2020, alongside the Organ Transplant Centre of Excellence. In December 2021, a Royal Order transformed KFSH into an independent, government-owned, non-profit foundation, aligning with Saudi Vision 2030 objectives. The Saudi Press Agency and Saudi Gazette both record the instrument as a royal order (أمر ملكي) issued on 21 December 2021. KFSH launched its Virtual Care Centre the same year.

In August 2026 the group opened Almather Hospital in Riyadh, a secondary care hospital for insured and self-paying patients offering internal medicine, general surgery, paediatrics, obstetrics and gynaecology, cardiology and orthopaedics, together with a sports medicine centre and a precision medicine clinic. The group described the new hospital as allowing KFSH itself to concentrate on complex referrals.

== Governance ==
Dr. Majid Ibrahim Alfayyadh is the CEO of KFSH. Björn Zoëga, who joined KFSH as deputy chief executive in 2024, serves as chief executive officer for the Riyadh hospital; in January 2026 the board approved the extension of his appointment through 2030. As of December 2023, the Board of Directors includes independent members and representatives from the Ministry of Health, Royal Clinics, and Ministry of Finance. As of 2026 the board also includes representatives of the Public Investment Fund and the Council of Health Insurance, alongside independent members affiliated with Johns Hopkins Medicine, Duke NUS Medical School and the Royal Marsden, and identifies Saleh Alqahtani as acting chairman.

== Operations and facilities ==
The hospital operates three branches in Saudi Arabia, located in Riyadh, Jeddah, and Madinah. In 2023 the group recorded approximately 1.9 million outpatient visits, an increase of 11% on the previous year, and more than 40,000 admissions across the three hospitals, an increase of 9%. Its corporate profile records 33,295 surgical procedures and 42,149 newly accepted patients in the same year. No later group wide totals have been published.

=== Riyadh ===
KFSH Riyadh serves as the primary facility. The branch covers an area of 1,000,000 m² and has a capacity of 1,519 beds. The campus is organised around centres of excellence covering organ transplantation, oncology, genomic medicine, neurosciences and cardiovascular care, and reports bed occupancy of 86.2%. In 2023, KFSH reported 1.9 million outpatient visits and an average patient stay of 8.8 days across its branches. In 2024 it treated international patients from 17 countries, 77% of them from other Gulf states, and reported a 47% increase in international patients over the year.

=== Jeddah ===
The Jeddah branch is a 537 bed hospital and serves the western region in Saudi Arabia. In 2025 it reported 132,368 outpatient visits within its core specialised services, an increase of 15.5% on 2024; 97,647 virtual clinic visits, up 12.1%; and 14,924 home healthcare visits, up 11.8%. It also reported reducing the time taken to decide on referrals to 21 hours, and introduced therapeutic plasma exchange as an outpatient service so that patients no longer require admission. In December 2024 the branch performed what KFSH described as the first fully robotic liver transplant in the country's western region, on a 23 year old man, in collaboration with the Riyadh liver transplant team.

=== Madinah ===
The Madinah branch has a 400 bed capacity. It treats paediatric and adult oncology patients and also provides ophthalmology, obstetrics and gynaecology. In 2025 it delivered 23,443 chemotherapy sessions, increasing its treatment capacity by 27% on 2024, and reported a 20% year on year rise in patients accepted. The Saudi Press Agency reported 42,402 outpatient visits within core specialised services for the same year, including 20,754 oncology visits, 7,815 new patients and 4,934 surgical operations. A comprehensive radiotherapy centre is under development. In November 2024 the branch introduced a virtual pathology service which KFSH said reduced diagnostic turnaround from more than a week to a single day.

=== Virtual care ===
The Virtual Care Centre, launched in 2021, is counted by KFSH as a fourth site alongside the three hospitals. It served approximately 180,000 patients in 2023 and delivered 293,381 virtual clinic visits in 2024, an increase of 58.2%, averaging more than 800 consultations a day. A round the clock emergency virtual clinic launched at the beginning of 2024 handled more than 23,500 consultations in its first year, about 2,000 patients a month. KFSH states that nearly 70% of its patients live outside Riyadh, Jeddah and Madinah; stable cases are managed virtually while urgent presentations are directed to the nearest emergency department, and prescriptions are posted to patients. A virtual pharmacy consultation service was added in 2024.

=== Patient flow and capacity ===
A Patient Flow and Capacity Command Centre, established in 2021 under the hospital's Centre for Healthcare Intelligence, uses real time monitoring and predictive analytics to forecast demand, detect delays in patient movement and alert staff. KFSH reported that it had made more than 170,000 interventions since its launch, reducing average bed waiting times from 32 hours to 6 hours and emergency waiting times by 14%. Separately, the hospital reported reducing the median time patients wait in the emergency department for an inpatient bed from more than 13 hours in 2023 to 3.2 hours by mid 2025, a reduction of 75%, attributing the improvement to direct admission pathways from outpatient clinics, earlier discharge rounds and faster discharge medication and diagnostics.

== Specialized departments ==
KFSH provides specialized programs and services in organ transplantation, oncology, genomics, and neuroscience.

=== Organ transplantation ===
Since the establishment of the Organ Transplant Program in 1981, KFSH has performed up to 9,000 successful organ transplants. Additionally, more than 5,000 kidneys have been transplanted since the center's inception. Transplantation of the abdominal organs and lungs is managed by an Organ Transplant Centre of Excellence established in 2020, which covers kidney, liver, lung, pancreas and small bowel transplantation and has reported more than 6,600 transplants since 2011. Heart transplantation is run separately by the Heart Centre.

The lung transplant programme, established in 1998, is described by the hospital as the only one in Saudi Arabia and the Gulf, with 268 transplants performed since 2000; the pancreas programme began in 2004 and has performed 56 transplants; and 16 bowel and multi-organ transplants have been performed since 2016. The Organ Transplant Centre of Excellence reported 882 transplants in 2024. Its paediatric activity that year included more than 100 liver, 80 kidney and two lung transplants, and KFSH states that its 80 paediatric kidney transplants were the highest annual volume reported worldwide.

The hospital operates a kidney paired donation programme, in which two or more incompatible donor and recipient pairs exchange kidneys so that each recipient receives a compatible organ. It reported reaching 500 such transplants in October 2024, performing ten paired transplants over two consecutive days in August 2025, and completing 130 in 2025 for a cumulative total of 691. KFSH stated that the 2025 figure exceeded the 94 performed by the highest volume single centre in the United States and the 73 performed across all 23 Canadian centres combined, and reported one year patient and graft survival of 97% to 99%. Women accounted for 62% of beneficiaries.

In August 2025 KFSH performed a heart transplant on a seven year old Saudi child using an organ from a brain dead donor in Abu Dhabi, coordinated between the Saudi Center for Organ Transplantation and the United Arab Emirates national donation programme. The centre runs a three year multi-organ transplant fellowship covering liver, kidney, pancreas and small bowel transplantation, and hosted an international consensus conference on minimally invasive transplantation in Riyadh in December 2024.

=== Robotic surgery ===
In 2023, KFSH conducted the world's first fully robotic liver transplant from a living donor. In 2024, the hospital performed the world's first fully robotic heart transplant on a 16-year-old patient with end-stage heart failure.

Both procedures were subsequently reported in the peer reviewed literature. The liver transplant was described in the International Journal of Surgery in 2024 and followed by a ten case series in Transplantation which the American Society of Transplantation named among its ten most impactful papers of that year; a 2026 review in the Journal of Robotic Surgery, by authors unconnected to KFSH, credits the team with the first fully robotic living donor liver transplant. The heart transplant was published as a first in human report in the Journal of Heart and Lung Transplantation in 2025 and cited in Nature Reviews Cardiology.

KFSH reported 1,370 robotic assisted operations in 2024. Robotic surgery is used across cardiac, transplant, thoracic and upper gastrointestinal, urological, neurosurgical and paediatric procedures. The robotic cardiac programme, begun in 2019, had performed more than 400 operations by mid 2024, which the hospital reported with a survival rate of 98%, and it states that an external assessment placed the programme among the top five of its kind worldwide and the highest volume outside the United States.

The robotic liver programme is led by Dieter Broering, executive director of the Organ Transplant Centre of Excellence, whose team reported a series of 501 robotic living donor hepatectomies in 2022, covering 501 cases performed between November 2018 and January 2022, with no donor mortality and a 6.4 percent complication rate, and described as the first single-centre report of more than 500 fully robotic donor hepatectomies, rising to more than 1,700 robotic living donor liver resections by mid 2026. Robotic liver transplants passed 100 in January 2026 and reached 165 by July 2026.

Beyond the two transplant firsts, the hospital has reported extending robotic techniques into new areas: into paediatric transplantation, with a fully robotic living donor liver transplant in an eight year old in 2025; into mechanical circulatory support, with robotic assisted implantations of a ventricular assist device in January 2025 and of a biventricular device in July 2025; and into thoracic, urological and neurosurgical work, including an Ivor Lewis oesophagectomy and a retroperitoneal lymph node dissection described as regional firsts, and an intracranial tumour resection in October 2025. A liver transplant performed through a single robotic incision in a six year old followed in July 2026.

=== Oncology and advanced therapies ===
The Oncology Centre treated approximately 25% of Saudi Arabia's cancer cases in 2023. The Oncology Centre engages in research and development of treatments, such as CAR T-cell therapy for blood cancers. KFSH describes the centre as the largest of its kind in the Gulf and it has been designated a World Health Organization Collaborating Centre for Cancer Prevention and Control. Radiotherapy services include intensity modulated and volumetric arc radiotherapy, TomoTherapy, CyberKnife, stereotactic radiosurgery and brachytherapy.

The King Fahad National Centre for Children's Cancer reported 66 beds and more than 700 new patients a year in 2025, together with over 150 haematopoietic stem cell transplants annually and 3,318 paediatric transplants performed cumulatively since 1993. It offers MIBG therapy for neuroblastoma and intra-arterial chemotherapy for retinoblastoma. KFSH's haematopoietic stem cell transplant programme marked its fortieth year in 2024, reporting more than 7,400 transplants of which 38% were in children, and stating that it was the first centre outside Europe accredited by the Joint Accreditation Committee ISCT-EBMT, in 2010.

KFSH administered 59 CAR T-cell therapies in 2023 and reported that more than 200 patients had received the therapy since 2020. It produced the first therapeutic T-cells manufactured in Saudi Arabia in June 2024, and in 2025 became the first institution in the country both to manufacture and to administer CAR T-cells in-house, treating a patient with relapsed or refractory B-cell acute lymphoblastic leukaemia in a phase I trial conducted under Saudi Food and Drug Authority oversight. The hospital reported that local manufacturing reduced the cost per patient from about SAR 1.3 million to about SAR 250,000 and shortened production from a range of 21 to 28 days to within 14 days; it has set a target of 100 gene therapy treatments a year. In April 2026 KFSH reported treating sickle cell disease with gene therapy, modifying and reinfusing a patient's own haematopoietic stem cells.

Separately, KFSH clinicians presented the in-house CAR T-cell manufacturing platform at the 67th American Society of Hematology annual meeting as a conference abstract in Blood, reporting an ultra-fast process of about 30 hours and a full GMP process completed in under two weeks.

In October 2025 the hospital launched what it described as Saudi Arabia's first gene and cell therapy manufacturing facility, occupying more than 5,000 square metres on the Riyadh campus with sixteen modular clean room clusters and operating to Good Manufacturing Practice standards. It is designed for an annual capacity of about 2,400 treatment doses and will initially produce T-cell therapies, stem cell treatments and viral vectors. KFSH projects that by 2030 the facility will meet roughly 9% of national demand and reduce treatment costs by an estimated eight billion riyals, figures which are forecasts rather than results achieved to date.

=== Genomic and precision medicine ===
KFSH's genomic medicine services include whole genome sequencing for diagnostic accuracy and personalized treatment plans. In 2023, the hospital performed over 7,000 whole genome sequencing tests, with accurate diagnoses achieved in over half of the cases. Total genomic testing of all kinds, a broader measure than whole genome sequencing alone, rose from approximately 22,000 tests in 2022 to more than 44,000 in 2024, while targeted mutation analyses increased from 3,969 in 2023 to 5,514 in 2024. KFSH reported a 67% reduction in the cost of whole genome sequencing in 2024 alongside a fivefold increase in analytical capacity.

The Genomic Medicine Centre of Excellence and its service model were described in a comment article in Nature Genetics in February 2026. In material accompanying that publication KFSH reported more than 5,000 precision oncology analyses, correction of previous misdiagnoses in about 80% of affected patients, and identification of targeted pathogenic variants in 23% of invasive prenatal tests. It also stated that it had contributed to the discovery of roughly a tenth of disease associated genes listed in OMIM, submitted about 8,000 variants to ClinVar as the largest contributor in the Middle East, and documented about 3,000 Arab specific variants, a third of which are absent from the gnomAD reference database.

A clinical pharmacogenomics service was introduced in 2023, initially in the Heart Centre and covering six frequently prescribed medicines, and was extended to organ transplant recipients in 2024; more than 1,500 patients had been tested by October 2024 and a dedicated pharmacogenomics clinic opened that December. A prenatal genomics programme reported detecting 276 fetal genetic disorders in 1,104 pregnancies using a panel of more than 300 genes. KFSH joined the BeginNGS newborn genome screening consortium in October 2025 and the Global Alliance for Genomics and Health in 2026, and has been certified as a national reference provider for metagenomic sequencing services. Since 2022 it has run the VarSome variant interpretation platform on its own premises so that genomic data remains inside Saudi Arabia.

=== Cardiovascular care ===
The Heart Centre covers adult and paediatric cardiology, cardiac surgery, interventional and structural heart procedures and electrophysiology. KFSH states that its heart transplant programme, begun in 1989, is the largest in the Middle East, with 413 transplants recorded by 2021. In 2023 the centre performed a heart transplant on what Saudi Gazette reported as the youngest patient in the Middle East, an Emirati girl under eight months old.

The robotic cardiac surgery programme, established in 2019, performs valve repair and replacement, coronary grafting, correction of congenital defects and cardiac tumour removal, including in children, and carried out the first reported robotic assisted implantations of a ventricular assist device in January 2025 and of a biventricular device in July 2025. Newsweek placed KFSH second in the Middle East for cardiology in its 2026 specialised hospital rankings.

=== Neurosciences ===
The Neurosciences Centre of Excellence covers adult and paediatric neurology, complex neurosurgery, epilepsy, movement disorders, neurovascular care, neuro-oncology and neuromuscular conditions, and operates theatres equipped with intraoperative MRI and neuronavigation. The epilepsy programme is its largest component: KFSH reported more than 2,000 surgical procedures for drug resistant epilepsy and more than 4,000 patients treated since 1993, describing it as the largest such centre in the Middle East. Stereo- electroencephalography, introduced in the mid 2020s, is used at a rate of one to two cases a week.

In 2024 the hospital reported treating drug resistant epilepsy by thermal radiofrequency ablation combined with electroencephalography without open surgery, describing the combination as a first in the Middle East. In 2025 it reported the region's first implantation of an artificial intelligence enabled brain sensing neurostimulation device for movement disorders and epilepsy, and opened a sixteen room smart neuroscience ward built around an electromagnetically shielded epilepsy monitoring unit with automated seizure detection.

== Research and education ==
The institute provides education and training programs, including postgraduate and undergraduate medical education in collaboration with universities in Saudi Arabia. It also operates a simulation center for training healthcare professionals.

KFSH collaborates with international and national institutions on research and education, including Johns Hopkins Medicine International, Alfaisal University, Mayo Clinic, Massachusetts General Hospital and Massachusetts Institute of Technology (MIT). With the Jameel Clinic at MIT, KFSH introduced Mirai, a deep learning mammography model that estimates breast cancer risk up to five years in advance, in Saudi Arabia in November 2023. A 2024 statement on strategic partnerships additionally names KAUST, the Saudi Space Agency, Northwestern Memorial Hospital and Houston Methodist.

=== Research ===
KFSH's research arm is organised into departments including genetics, molecular oncology, cell biology, infection and immunity, biomedical physics, comparative medicine, and biostatistics and epidemiology, together with a cyclotron and radiopharmaceuticals unit and a research centre at the Jeddah campus. Research is overseen by a Research Advisory Council with standing committees for research ethics, clinical research, basic research and animal care. The hospital publishes the Annals of Saudi Medicine, ISSN 0256-4947 and indexed in MEDLINE, and in 2025 modernised a biobank designed to hold up to ten million biospecimens.

KFSH states that it maintains more than 2,400 active research projects with over 300 researchers and more than 100 international collaborations, and publishes upwards of 1,100 papers a year. Its 2023 annual research report records 1,151 indexed publications, 13 patent applications filed and six patents granted, of which one was a United States patent. The hospital reported 701 active research proposals at the end of 2024, an increase of 8%.

KFSH reported 35 of its scientists in the August 2025 Stanford University and Elsevier data update listing the most cited 2 percent of researchers worldwide.

Fowzan Alkuraya, founding chairman of the hospital's department of translational genomics and a recipient of the American Society of Human Genetics' Curt Stern Award in 2020, has been among its most cited researchers. He moved to a role in the Saudi biotechnology sector in 2024 while continuing to publish with the institution, and was elected to the American Society of Human Genetics board of directors for a term beginning in 2026. A 2025 Nature Genetics review he co-authored argued that the high rates of consanguinity and founder mutations in the Greater Middle East make the region an under-used resource for rare disease gene discovery.

In 2023 four biomedical experiments designed by KFSH researchers were carried out aboard the International Space Station during the Saudi human spaceflight mission, examining how immune cells respond to inflammation in microgravity and how gene expression changes over time. The results were published in Science Advances in 2026: the study reported that spaceflight altered molecular networks in a human monocyte cell model, affecting pathways associated with muscle and cardiac contraction, neuronal signalling and sensory perception, and reducing expression of DNA repair genes. The study was published by KFSH researchers with the Saudi astronaut Rayyanah Barnawi as a co-author. The hospital signed a memorandum of understanding with the Saudi Space Agency on space medicine in 2025.

=== Clinical trials ===
KFSH established a Clinical Trials Transformation Initiative in 2021 to build what it describes as an integrated clinical research ecosystem. Its 2023 annual research report records 60 active interventional trials initiated that year. At the end of 2024 the hospital stated that it accounted for 52% of the 470 clinical studies then active in Saudi Arabia, and in September 2025 it reported 104 active trials with a further 80 studies being activated, representing 48% of the clinical trials newly registered nationally in the first half of that year. The two shares measure different things: the first counts studies active at a point in time, the second counts new registrations. Trials span cancer, cardiovascular, musculoskeletal, dermatological and autoimmune, gastrointestinal and liver, and endocrine and metabolic disease.

The hospital conducts early phase studies, including the phase I trial of its locally manufactured CAR T-cell product, supported by apheresis and Good Manufacturing Practice facilities on site, and reported a one-time gene therapy restoring clotting function in eight patients with haemophilia.

=== Education and training ===
KFSH describes its education portfolio as comprising more than 200 specialised programmes accredited by the Saudi Commission for Health Specialties. Separately, its diagnostic radiology, internal medicine and paediatrics programmes received initial accreditation from the Accreditation Council for Graduate Medical Education International effective July 2024, and KFSH became an ACGME-I sponsoring institution. Undergraduate medical education is delivered in partnership with Alfaisal University, alongside medical internships in Riyadh and Jeddah, nursing and allied health training, and continuing medical education.

In May 2025 KFSH graduated 334 physicians, comprising 191 from fellowship programmes, 120 residents and 23 from specialised health diplomas, which it described as the largest graduating class in its history. At the following ceremony in January 2026 it graduated 379 physicians, comprising 233 fellows, 124 residents and 22 clinical diploma graduates. The simulation centre, inaugurated in October 2020, contains four flexible simulation rooms, two clinics, two simulated patient rooms and four debriefing rooms, and uses three dimensional printing and virtual reality alongside surgical endoscopy and neurosurgical systems.

== Digital health and artificial intelligence ==
KFSH established a Centre for Healthcare Intelligence in 2019 to develop artificial intelligence and related technologies for clinical and operational use. The centre reports having built more than twenty applications in-house, covering medical imaging, clinical decision support and hospital operations, and runs a training programme in applied healthcare artificial intelligence with the Saudi Commission for Health Specialties. Named systems include JuhAIna, a generative model that summarises patient records for organ transplant clinics, and predictive models for bone marrow transplant complications, heart failure readmission and five year breast cancer risk. By 2025 the hospital described more than thirty artificial intelligence tools in use, including systems for clinical note drafting, medical translation and chest radiograph and brain CT analysis. The Patient Flow and Capacity Command Centre described above is operated by the same centre.

KFSH uses a Cerner electronic health record and in 2015 became the first healthcare facility outside North America to reach stage 7 of the HIMSS ambulatory electronic medical record adoption model. It was recognised by CHIME as a Digital Health Most Wired organisation in 2022. In April 2025 it co-hosted the Mass General Brigham MESH Core healthcare innovation programme in Riyadh, the first time the programme was held outside the United States.

== Rankings and recognition ==
In Newsweek's World's Best Hospitals ranking, KFSH placed 229th globally and second in the Middle East in 2024, 209th in 2025 and 153rd in 2026, and is ranked first in Saudi Arabia. It has also been listed among Newsweek's World's Best Smart Hospitals, a list of 350 institutions that does not publish individual ranks. In Newsweek's Best Specialized Hospitals: Middle East 2026 the Riyadh hospital ranked first in the region in oncology and orthopaedics, second in cardiology, gastroenterology and neurology, and fifth in paediatrics; the Jeddah hospital was also ranked in all six specialties.

In the Brand Finance Global Top 250 Hospitals report, which measures brand strength as surveyed among healthcare professionals rather than clinical outcomes, KFSH ranked 20th globally in 2024, 15th in 2025 and 12th in 2026, and first in the Middle East and North Africa for a fourth consecutive year, with a brand strength index of 77.7. In a separate Brand Finance report it was named the most valuable healthcare brand in Saudi Arabia and the Middle East in 2026, with a brand value of about US$1.7 billion. In the SCImago Institutions Rankings 2026, KFSH held an overall institutional world rank of 2961 and was placed in the first quartile of Saudi Arabia's health sector, ranking first nationally in that sector in subject areas including cardiology and cardiovascular medicine, gastroenterology and nephrology.

In Newsweek's World's Best Specialized Hospitals 2027, published on 17 September 2026, the Riyadh hospital was listed in nine specialties: neurology, neurosurgery, cardiology, cardiac surgery, oncology, paediatrics, gastroenterology, pulmonology and orthopaedics. The Jeddah hospital was listed in three: obstetrics and gynaecology, neurology and oncology, giving ten distinct specialties across the two campuses. The ranking is based on a survey of healthcare professionals weighted at 83.5 per cent, accreditation at 10 per cent and implementation of patient reported outcome measures at 6.5 per cent.

KFSH was first accredited by Joint Commission International in 2000, which the hospital states made it the first healthcare institution in Saudi Arabia to be so accredited, and renewed its Academic Medical Centre accreditation in July 2024. KFSH states that it was designated a Magnet organisation by the American Nurses Credentialing Center in 2013 and 2019 and applied for redesignation in 2024. In July 2025 it received Global Healthcare Accreditation for medical travel services with a score of 95%. Other accreditations listed by the hospital include CBAHI, the College of American Pathologists, AABB, JACIE for cell therapy, the American College of Radiology and ISO/IEC 17025 and 27001. It received the King Hussein Award for Cancer Research for institutional excellence in 2021.

== Notable events ==
- Death of Idi Amin, former dictator of Uganda, in 2003.
- King Fahad died in August 2005.
- King Salman underwent surgery for his gallbladder in July 2020.
- Mohammad Bin Salman was admitted and underwent surgery for appendicitis in February 2021.

== See also ==
- List of hospitals in Saudi Arabia
- List of things named after Saudi kings
- King Saud Medical Complex
