= P. R. Dubhashi =

Indian civil servant (1930–2020)

- Born: 7 March 1930; Karwar, Karnataka, India
- Died: 31 August 2020 (aged 90)
- Occupations: Civil servant, social scientist
- Awards: Padma Bhushan; Shiromani Award; Ganesh Saraswati Thakurdesai Award; Lokhitwadi Gopal Hari Deshmukh Award

Padmakar Ramachandra Dubhashi (7 March 1930 – 31 August 2020) was an Indian civil servant, administrator, author, social scientist and academician, known for his administrative and academic abilities. He was a pioneer of Cooperative movement and was instrumental in housing the Goa University in a new campus, a feat he accomplished during his tenure as the Vice-Chancellor of the university. The Government of India honoured him, in 2010, with Padma Bhushan, the third highest civilian award, for his services to the nation.

== Biography ==
P. R. Dubhashi was born on 7 March 1930 in Karwar district of the South Indian state of Karnataka. He received a MA and a Ph.D. from Pune University and a DLitt from Bombay University. In 1953, he joined the Indian Administrative Service.

He started his career in Davangere, as a divisional officer. During a career as a public servant starting in 1953, he held many posts of importance such as Divisional Commissioner, Additional Secretary in the Ministry of Agriculture, the Director of the Indian Institute of Public Administration (IIPA) and the Government Secretary in the Prime Minister's Office, from where he retired in 1981. In between, he was selected for British Council scholarship to the London School of Economics where he obtained a post graduate diploma in Economic and Social Administration, in 1963.

The Government of India continued to make use of his service, even after his retirement and he served in such capacities as member of the Expert Committee on Rural Finance for NABARD and as the Chairman of the Management Institutes Committee for the Pune University. He was also active organising conferences and delivering key lectures such as Dr. Zakir Hussain Memorial Lecture and John Mathai Memorial Lecture. In 1990, he was appointed as the Vice-Chancellor of Goa University. By the time he retired from the post in 1995, he was successful in moving the university to a new campus. He has also worked with international agencies like IFAD and Asian Development Bank as consultant. He was the Chairman of Bharatiya Vidya Bhavan, at its Pune centre.

Dubhashi was married to Sindhu and the couple had a daughter, Medha and a son, Devadatt, both pursuing academic careers.

== Awards and recognitions ==
- Padma Bhushan – 2013
- Lokhitwadi Gopal Hari Deshmukh Award – Maharashtra Sahitya Parishad – 2006
- Ganesh Saraswati Thakurdesai Award – Maharashtra Sahitya Parishad – 1999
- Shiromani Award – 1993
- Gokhale Institute of Politics and Economics, Pune has named an annual lecture after him.

== Writings ==
Dubhashi authored 27 books of which 21 are in English and 6 in Marathi. He wrote on topics such as economic planning, public administration, rural development, cooperative movement and other social issues. .

=== Books ===
- Essays in Public Administration, 1985
- P. R. Dubhashi (1986). Policy and Performance: Agricultural and Rural Development in Post-Independence India. SAGE Publications. p. 320. ISBN 978-0803995161.
- Administrative Reforms, 1986
- Essays in Development Administration, 1986
- Economic Thought Of The Twentieth Century And Other Essays, 1995
- Recent Trends in Public Administration, 1995
- Essays on rural development, 1996
- P. R. Dubhashi (2000). Building up a new university. Allied Publishers. p. 207. ISBN 978-8177640083.
- Pursuing Idealism Through Civil Service: Memories of an Administrator and a Trainer, 2007
