= Shashikumar Chitre =

Indian mathematician and astrophysicist (1936–2021)

Shashikumar Madhusudan Chitre
- Born: 7 May 1936; India
- Died: 11 January 2021 (aged 84)
- Education: Elphinstone College; Peterhouse, Cambridge
- Occupations: Astrophysicist, Mathematician
- Awards: Padma Bhushan

Shashikumar Madhusudan Chitre FNA, FASc, FNASc, FRAS (7 May 1936 – 11 January 2021) was an Indian mathematician and astrophysicist, known for his research in Astronomy and Astrophysics. The Government of India honored him, in 2012, with Padma Bhushan, the third highest civilian award, for his services to the sciences.

== Biography ==
Illustration of the dynamo mechanism that creates the Earth's magnetic field: convection currents of magma in the Earth's outer core, driven by heat flow from the inner core, organized into rolls by the Coriolis force, creates circulating electric currents, which generate the magnetic field.

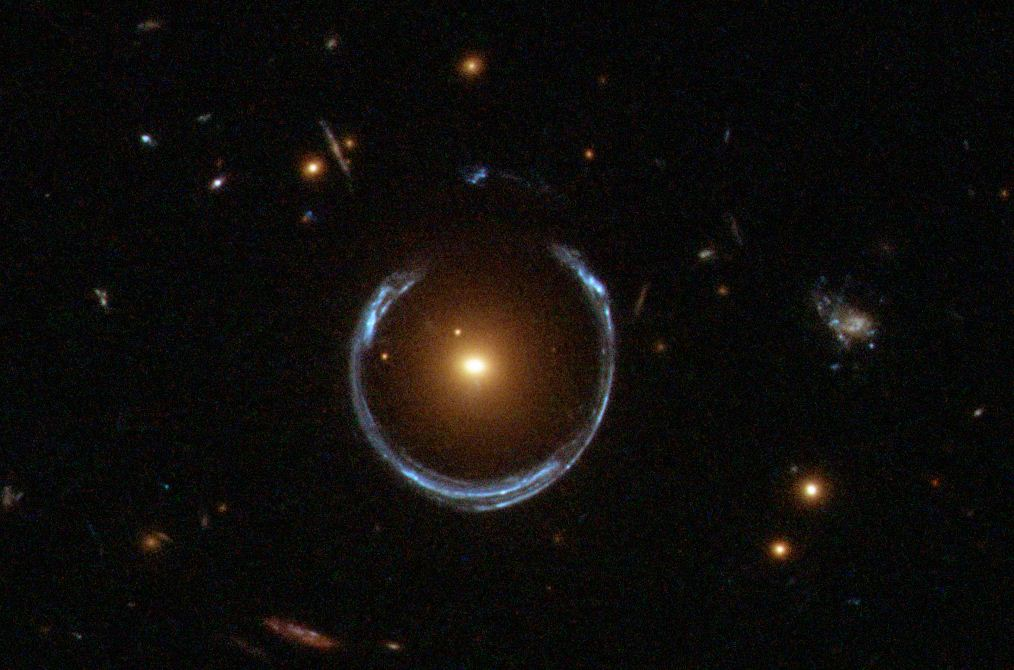
Gravitational Lensing - A Horseshoe Einstein Ring from Hubble

Shashikumar Chitre graduated in Mathematics from the Elphinstone College, Mumbai, in 1956, on completion of which he was awarded the Duke of Edinburgh Scholarship to study abroad. He joined Peterhouse, University of Cambridge and did another bachelor's degree in 1959. In 1960, he was selected as the Peterhouse Scholar, with which he completed his master's degree. Subsequently, he got selected for Gulbenkian Research studentship, moved to Churchill College and obtained his PhD from the Department of Applied Mathematics and Theoretical Physics of Cambridge, in 1963.

Chitre started his career as a lecturer at the University of Leeds, in 1963, and worked there till 1966 when he obtained another fellowship to join the California Institute of Technology, Pasadena. In 1967, he returned to India and joined the faculty of Tata Institute of Fundamental Research, which served as the base of his research till his retirement in 2001. He lived in Mumbai, attending to his duties as the Academic Chair Person and professor emeritus of the Centre for Excellence in Basic Sciences (CBS) and the INSA Honorary Scientist at the University of Mumbai. He was also on the board of Trustees of JN Tata Trust and worked as an Honorary Executive Director of Homi Bhabha Fellowship Council.

Chitre died on 11 January 2021, aged 84.

== Research highlights ==
Chitre's scientific research was focused on solar physics, astrophysics and gravitational lensing. He performed extensive research on the Sun's magnetic activity cycle, the solar dynamo theory, and the role of neutrinos in the solar atmosphere.

== Positions held ==
Sashikumar Chitre has been honored by fellowships by many prominent scientific institutions.

- MaxPlanck Fellow at the Max Planck Institute for Extraterrestrial Physics
- Indian Academy of Sciences
- Indian National Science Academy (1988)
- National Academy of Sciences, India (1992)
- Third World Academy of Sciences (1999)
- Maharashtra Academy of Sciences
- Royal Astronomical Society
- International Astronomical Union

Chitre also served as a visiting fellow or visiting professor at various prestigious institutions around the world.

- UGC National Lecturer in Physics - 1975-76
- Visiting Professor - University of Cambridge
- Visiting Professor - Princeton University
- Visiting Professor - University of Sussex
- Visiting Professor - University of Amsterdam
- Visiting Professor - Columbia University
- Visiting Professor - University of Virginia
- Visiting Professor - Queen Mary and Westfield College, University of London - 1992-1993, '94-'95 and '97
- Senior Research Associateship at Goddard Space Flight Centre, NASA
- Senior Research Associateship of the National Academy of Sciences, USA
- Visiting Astronomer - Institute of Astronomy, Cambridge - 2003-2005 and 2007
- Perren Visiting Fellow and Visiting Professor - Physical Research Laboratory, Ahmedabad - 1999-2000
- Raja Ramanna Fellow - University of Mumbai - 2001-06.

He has also held the posts of:

- President - Astronomical Society of India
- Chairman — Indian National Committee for Astronomy
- Chairman — Bombay Association for Science Education
- Member, Management Board - National Centre for Radio Astrophysics
- Member, Management Boards - Homi Bhabha Centre for Science Education
- Council Member, - Indian Academy of Sciences, Bangalore
- Council Member, Indian National Science Academy, New Delhi
- Council Member, National Academy of Sciences, Allahabad

== Awards and recognitions ==
- Padma Bhushan - 2012
- Professor A. C. Banerjee Memorial Lecture Award - 1992
- INSA Vainu Bappu Memorial Medal - 1995
- M. P. Birla Award - 1999

== Writings ==
- SM Chitre (December 1995). "Probing the Solar Interior". Journal of Astrophysics and Astronomy. 16 (Supplement): 343. Bibcode:1995JApAS..16..343C.
- F. Bernardeau; T. P. Singh; B. Banerjee; S. M. Chitre (1994). "The Quasi-Linear Evolution of the Density Field in Models of Gravitational Instability". Mon. Not. R. Astron. Soc. 269 (4): 947. arXiv:astro-ph/9311055. Bibcode:1994MNRAS.269..947B. doi:10.1093/mnras/269.4.947.
- Narasimha, D.; Chitre, S. M. (1993). "Probing galaxy clusters with straight arcs". Institut d'Astrophysique, Liège. 31: 641. Bibcode:1993LIACo..31..641N.
- D. Narasimha; S. Nair; S. Chitre (1992). "Unobserved lensing agents". Gravitational Lenses. Lecture Notes in Physics. Vol. 406. p. 379. Bibcode:1992LNP...406..379N. doi:10.1007/3-540-55797-0_140. ISBN 978-3-540-55797-5.
- D. Narasimha; S. Chitre (1992). "The Triple Quasar PG1115+080". Gravitational Lenses. Lecture Notes in Physics. Vol. 406. pp. 128–133. Bibcode:1992LNP...406..128N. doi:10.1007/3-540-55797-0_91. ISBN 978-3-540-55797-5.
- B. BANERJEE; S. M. CHITRE; P. P. DIVAKARAN; K. S. V. SANTHANAM (1976). "Polymerisation and the solar neutrino problem". Nature. 260 (5551): 557. Bibcode:1976Natur.260..557B. doi:10.1038/260557a0.
