= King Fahd University Hospital =

King Fahd Hospital of the University (KFHU)
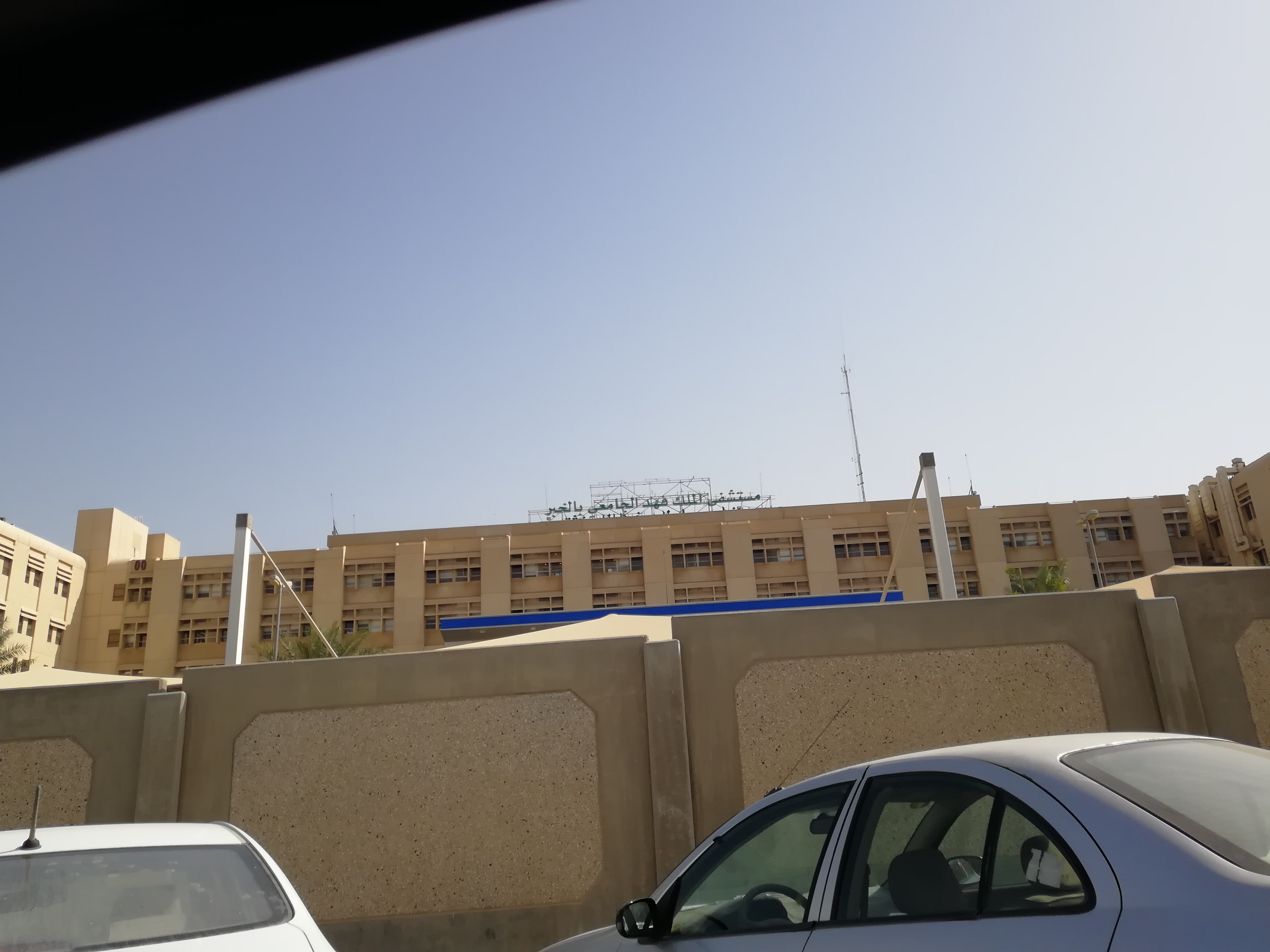

Geography
- Location: Saudi Arabia
- Coordinates: 25.377910°N 49.789084°E

Organisation
- Care system: public
- Type: Teaching, District General
- Affiliated university: Imam Abdulrahman Bin Faisal University

Services
- Beds: 550

History
- Founded: 1981

Links
- Website: www.iau.edu.sa/en/university-hospitals/king-fahd-hospital-of-the-university
- Lists: Hospitals in Saudi Arabia

King Fahd Hospital of the University (KFHU) in Al-Khobar, Saudi Arabia is a public hospital affiliated with Imam Abdulrahman Bin Faisal University (formerly known as the University of Dammam, which was previously part of King Faisal University). The hospital was built by the Ministry of Health as part of the 'Five Hospitals Project' and was originally named Al Khobar Teaching Hospital and was subsequently transferred to King Faisal University. It was renamed King Fahd Hospital of the University and was inaugurated on 19 May 1981 (1401 AH) by then Minister for Health, Dr. Hussain Al Jazairy.

The hospital's main purpose is to train students during their clinical years. It has a capacity of 550-beds distributed across a four-storey building. Each floor houses different wards and serves distinct patient groups. The hospital's functions include patient care, teaching and training, and scientific research.

== History ==
King Fahd University Hospital was constructed by the Ministry of Health as part of the 'Five Hospitals Project' and was originally named Al-Khobar Teaching Hospital, and was subsequently transferred to King Faisal University. Its title was changed to King Fahd Hospital of the University (KFHU) as part of the renaming of hospitals established under the project. KFHU was inaugurated on 19 May 1981 by Hussain Al Jazairy, the then Minister of Health. In 1983, the hospital was accredited for training in Family and Community Medicine.

In 1985, a grant supporting a King Faisal University tumour registry project became associated with King Fahd Hospital of the University. The project was described as the first attempt to establish a regional population-based tumour registry in Saudi Arabia. The hospital later served as the Eastern Region office of the Saudi Cancer Registry.

The Dammam branch of King Faisal University became an independent entity, known as the University of Dammam, in 2009. In 2014, hospital administrators reported plans to increase the hospital's capacity through extensions to inpatient wards and intensive care facilities. A six-storey expansion was inaugurated by Saud bin Nayef Al Saud, governor of the Eastern Province, in 2015. The project, which began in April 2013 and was completed in May 2015, covered approximately 10,000 square metres and cost SAR 100 million. It provided 100 beds, comprising 50 inpatient beds, 20 adult intensive care beds, 20 neonatal intensive care beds, and 10 beds associated with gastrointestinal endoscopy services. The extension also included five digital endoscopy procedure rooms and was connected to the existing hospital building by bridges.

In 2016, the university was renamed Imam Abdulrahman Bin Faisal University. In the same year, the hospital established a Special Medical Services Centre to provide fee-based healthcare services.

The hospital received Joint Commission International (JCI) accreditation in 2015 and entered a second accreditation cycle in September 2018. Ministry of Health figures and academic reports list the hospital as having 550 beds.

During the first wave of the COVID-19 pandemic in 2020, the hospital participated in a Saudi multicentre study of convalescent plasma. A later analysis reported that 185 intensive care unit (ICU) patients were recruited at KFHU between March and September 2020.

By 2021, KFHU was described as a comprehensive stroke centre in the Eastern Province and had implemented a "thrombectomy-and-back" transfer model for patients requiring mechanical thrombectomy. In 2024, the hospital's Heart Centre introduced robot-assisted open-heart surgery; by August that year, the hospital had reported completing 12 such operations. In 2025, the hospital reported the use of robotic surgery to stabilise spinal and pelvic fractures.

== Clinical facilities ==
KFHU provides inpatient, outpatient, emergency, and specialist medical services in Al-Khobar. Its facilities include inpatient wards, operating theatres, intensive care units, diagnostic services, and specialised clinical units.

In February 2012, the hospital operated a specialist pain management centre providing treatment for acute and chronic pain conditions. Its services included medication-based treatment and interventional procedures, including nerve blocks and radiofrequency techniques. In September 2012, the hospital's orthopaedic surgery department was reported to have established a specialist shoulder and upper-limb surgery clinic. The clinic also accepted patients referred by external specialists.

The hospital also operates a cochlear implant programme within its otolaryngology services. The programme was established in 2009, and by 2026, the hospital reported that more than 500 patients had received cochlear implants through the service.

In February 2021, the hospital inaugurated a video-electroencephalography (EEG) monitoring unit within its neurology department. The unit provides inpatient monitoring of seizure activity using continuous EEG, including the identification of seizure types and origins, assessment before epilepsy surgery, and investigation of suspected non-epileptic seizures.

A Special Medical Services Centre was opened at the hospital in 2016 to provide fee-based healthcare services. In December 2023, the centre reported an increase in inpatient accommodation of 20 beds for adult and paediatric medical and surgical services, together with increased operating capacity.

In January 2026, the hospital opened a specialist kidney stone and urology clinic jointly operated by nephrology and urological surgery specialists. The clinic provides assessment and treatment for recurrent kidney stones, including those associated with metabolic disorders.

== Research and education ==
=== Medical education and training ===
KFHU serves as a clinical training site for students of Imam Abulrahman Bin Faisal University. Students enrolled at the university's nursing programme undertake practical training in different hospital departments as part of their clinical education.

The hospital participates in the university's one-year medical internship programme, which includes placements at King Faisal Hospital of the University and other recognised training hospitals. The programme comprises rotations in internal medicine, surgery, obstetrics and gyanecology, paediatrics, family and community medicine, emergency medicine, and elective specialties. KFHU also provides postgraduate clinical training for resident physicians.

The hospital also provides training events and courses. In November 2015, the hospital's Emergency Medicine department, in cooperation with its Academic Affairs and Training department, organised a research event at which resident physicians presented scientific studies and research proposals. Additionally, disaster management and emergency preparedness courses have been hosted on the premises.

Medical education research conducted at the hospital has included a study published in 2020 examining patients' attitudes towards medical students' participation in clinical care. Another study, published in 2025, evaluated a pharmacist-led prescription writing course for undergraduate medical students.

=== Clinical research ===
KFU has been a setting for clinical research in areas including healthcare quality, patient safety, and neurological disorders. Studies published in 2021 examined clinical quality indicators before and after hospital accreditation and healthcare workers' perceptions of patient safety culture.

Research at the hospital has additionally used a prospectively maintained stroke registry. A study published in 2026 analysed the diagnostic evaluation of young adults with ischaemic stroke admitted to KFHU between 2020 and 2025.

== Healthcare information system ==
King Fahd Hospital of the University uses electronic information systems for clinical care, patient records, scheduling, and related administrative functions. A study based on data collected in 2014 reported that the hospital used the QuadraMed electronic health record system.

As part of its computerised medical records system, KFHU uses numeric unit numbering, whereby each patient is assigned a unique identification number. The hospital has also used a straight numeric filing system for patient records. More recent research based on KFHU records from 2024 and 2025 identifies InterSystems TrakCare as the hospital's information system. TrakCare was used to retrieve both clinical and administrative information, including appointment dates and status, care providers, departments, services, payers, and patient categories.

== See also ==
- List of hospitals in Saudi Arabia
- List of things named after Saudi kings
