= Nandkishore Shamrao Laud =

Indian surgeon

- Occupation: Surgeon

Nandkishore Shamrao Laud is an Indian orthopaedic surgeon who was awarded with the honour of Padma Bhusan, the third highest civilian award of India in 2013 for his pioneering contributions to joint replacement surgery.

== Education ==
Laud holds Master of Surgery (orthopaedics) from University of Bombay. He is the former professor and head, department of orthopaedic surgery and traumatology and chief of trauma service at Lokmanya Tilak Municipal Medical College and General Hospital, Sion, Mumbai. He is currently associated with Laud Clinic, Shushrusha Citizens' Co-operative Hospital and Breach Candy Hospital, Mumbai.
