= King Faisal University =

Saudi Arabian university

- جامعة الملك فيصل
- Type: Public
- Established: 1975; 51 years ago
- Faculty: 2,121
- Students: 90,000+
- Location: Al-Ahsa, Saudi Arabia; 25°20′22.38″N 49°35′50.86″E
- Campus: 6 km^{2} (2.3 sq mi)
- Website: www.kfu.edu.sa

King Faisal University (KFU) (Arabic: جامعة الملك فيصل Ğāmiʿat al-Malak Fayṣal) is a public university in Hofuf, Saudi Arabia. Founded in 1975, it is named after King Faisal bin Abdulalziz, the ruler of Saudi Arabia from 1964 until 1975. KFU was initially established with four colleges: two in Dammam and the other two in Al-Ahsa. Later, the colleges in Dammam have been segregated to the Imam Abdulrahman Bin Faisal University.

== History ==
The university was founded in 1975 by the Royal Decree No. H / 67 1395 e in the eastern region of the country. In its first year, it leased buildings, and in subsequent years it used some prefabricated buildings for the colleges.

The first four scientific colleges were: The College of Agricultural and Food Sciences and the College of Veterinary Medicine and Animal Husbandry at the main campus in Al Ahsa; and the College of Architecture and Planning and the College of Medicine and Medical Sciences in Dammam. In later years, with the intent to meet the future needs of the Kingdom, with the issuance of Royal decree No. 7 / b / 11155, and with the consent of the Custodian of the Two Holy Mosques and the Chairman of the Board of Higher Education, the College of Education was founded in 1981, and the Faculty of Administrative Sciences and Planning in 1984. The teaching hospital, the King Fahd University Hospital, is in Khobar, although a newer hospital is currently under construction near the main campus of the university.

In 1996, Royal decree No. 7 / b / 11155, with the consent of the Custodian of the Two Holy Mosques and the Chairman of the Board of Higher Education, sought separate dental and technical laboratories from the college of medicine and medical science in Dammam. The Faculty of Dentistry and the Faculty of Applied Medical Sciences was founded in Klitin.

=== Goals ===
One of the main goals of the university was in the area of scientific research to be one of the basic requirements so as to address the problems of society. Since its inception, and through years of development, the university has sought to revitalize and strengthen scientific research in various fields and disciplines through intensive activity carried out by colleges and research centers, as well as through coordination with other centers from outside the university, the university has completed more than forty national research projects. It has also published more than 2,000 scientific articles in domestic and international scientific journals.

The university also developed and modernised its curriculum, study plans and educational programmes in all colleges to be consistent with the requirements of the Saudi society, as well as to cope with the latest scientific and technical developments.

== Achievements ==
The University has also given special attention to conferences and symposia in scientific and cultural enrichment of knowledge and community service. It has organised more than 66 local and global conferences symposia. Additionally its faculty members have been represented at more than 300 scientific conference and a symposium at home and abroad.

This meant such beneficiaries as computer applications and expanded uses at the administrative and academic level to contribute to automated and streamlined administrative and academic management decisions, including the following regulations: automated information systems at the university level, students' record system, system stores procurement, financial system, a patient care system, and architectural designs.

University rankings

Global – Overall
- QS World: =648 (2026)

In terms of ranking, KFU has been ranked #22 in QS Ranking for Arab Region 2016.

== Colleges ==
By 2010 the number of colleges at KFU has risen to 15 including the following:

- Agriculture and Food Sciences.
- Veterinary Medicine.
- Medicine.
- Engineering.
- College of Clinical Pharmacy.
- Science.
- College of Computer Science and Information Technology.
- Business Administration.
- Education.
- Arts.
- Applied Studies and Community Service.
- Community College (for girls).
- Applied Medical Sciences.
- Dentistry.
- College of Law

Women's Sections

- College of Education for Girls - Scientific sections
- College of Education for Girls - Art sections
- College of Community for Girls
- College of Intermediate Health for Girls
- College of Law

== President of the University ==
Doctor Adel bin Mohammed Abu Zenadah

== See also ==
- List of things named after Saudi kings
- List of universities and colleges in Saudi Arabia
