= Imam Abdulrahman Bin Faisal University =

University in Saudi Arabia

- جامعة الإمام عبد الرحمن بن فيصل
- Former names: King Faisal University; University of Dammam
- Type: Public university
- Established: 1975; 51 years ago
- President: Abdullah M. Al Rubaish
- Academic staff: 2,094 (2023)
- Students: 85,407
- Undergraduates: 28,079 (2023)
- Postgraduates: 57,328 (2020)
- Location: Dammam, Eastern Province, Saudi Arabia; 26°23′38″N 50°11′22″E
- Campus: Urban
- Language: English, Arabic
- Website: iau.edu.sa

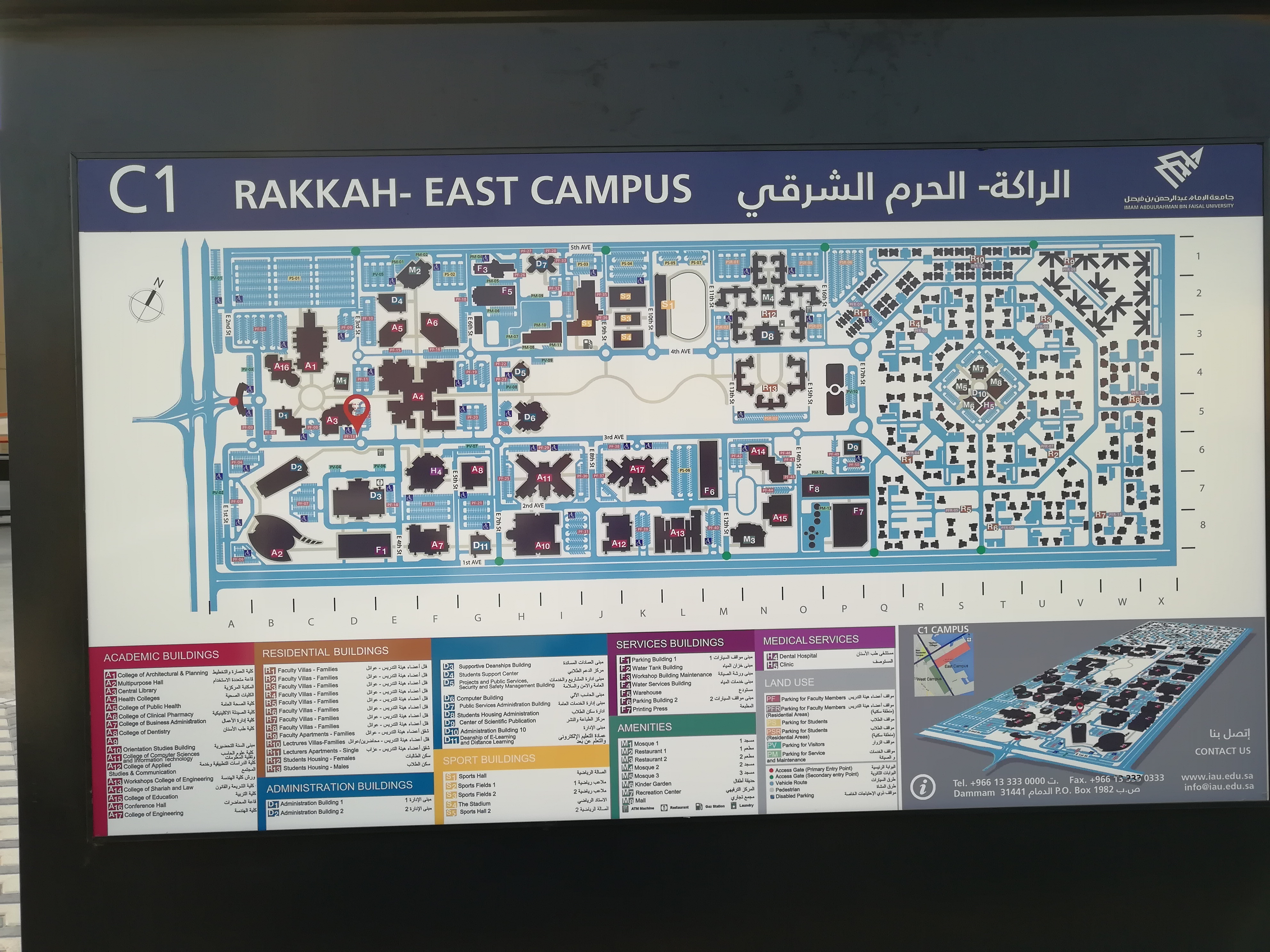
Imam Abdulrahman bin Faisal University campus map

Imam Abdulrahman Bin Faisal University (IAU), formerly known as the University of Dammam, is a public university in Dammam, Saudi Arabia. It is one of the oldest and leading universities in medicine in the country's Eastern Province. It is named after Abdul Rahman bin Faisal, the last ruler of the Second Saudi State and the father of King Abdulalziz ibn Saud, the founder and first monarch of Saudi Arabia

Prof. Fahad Alharbi is its President. It was a previously a part of King Faisal University (now in Al-hasa only).

The new name is Imam Abdulrahman Bin Faisal University, it has been renamed during the visit of King Salman bin Abdulaziz to Dammam November 2016.

The main campus is in the coastal area of Al-Rakah (situated between Dammam and Khobar). Several colleges are scattered around the eastern province (College of Medicine is in the main campus.)

The admissions to this university is based on standardized national exams. Afterwards, students are admitted into tracks based on their grades. In their first year, students compete for majors where the top students are sorted into the colleges of their choice. The medical track is one of the most competitive in the entire university. For example, only the top 140 students would be admitted into the college of medicine, and so on.

In May 2021, Dr. Ebtisam Mohammed Al-Mathal, who is the dean of human resources and a professor of parasitology in the science faculty, was appointed secretary of the board of trustees at the university.

== History ==
The University of Dammam was founded 1975 with two colleges - the College of Medicine and the College of Architecture. Both male and female students have been enrolled at the University since its inception.

Other colleges followed: Applied Medical Sciences (1995), Dentistry (2001), Applied Studies and Community Services (2003) and Nursing.

== University Colleges ==
- College of Medicine
- College of Dentistry University of Dammam
- Medical Applied Sciences
- Science
- Nursing
- Computer Science and Information Technology
- Engineering
- College of Architecture and Planning
- Business administration
- Basic Medical Sciences
- Medical Applied Sciences- Qatif
- Education-Hafer AlBatin
- Science and Arts-Khafji
- Medical Applied Sciences - Jubail (Under Construction)
- Dammam Community College
- Clinical Pharmacy (Under Construction)
- Public Health (Under Construction)
- Administrative Sciences Qatif (Under Construction)
- Design
- Medical Applied Sciences - Jubail (Under Construction)
- Clinical Pharmacy
- Public Health
- Administrative Sciences Qatif (Under Construction)
- Design

== See also ==
- List of universities and colleges in Saudi Arabia
