= King Fahad Medical City =

Coordinates: 24°41′15″N 46°42′19″E

King Fahad Medical City مدينة الملك فهد الطبية
- Ministry of Health, Saudi Arabia
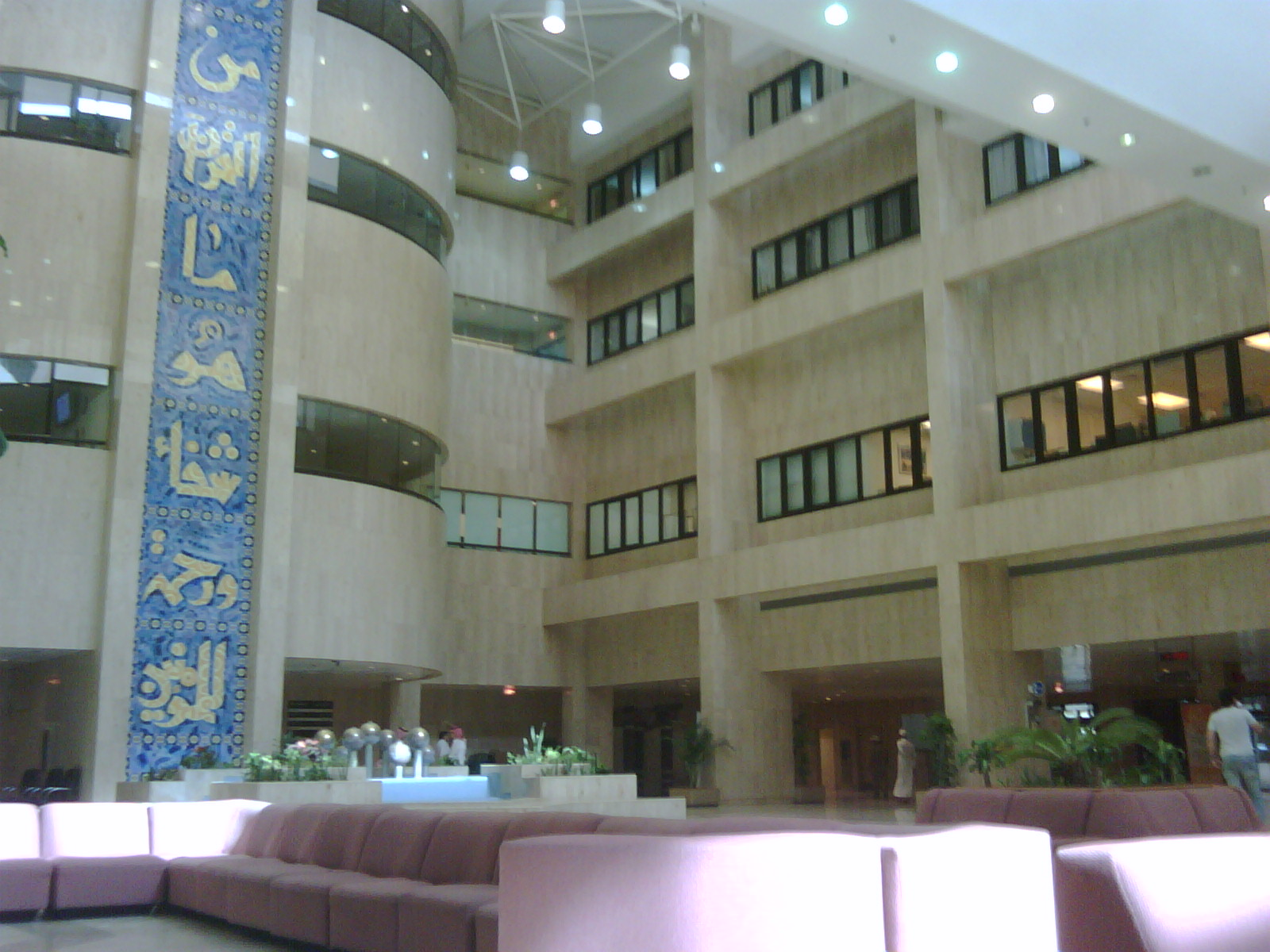

Geography
- Location: Riyadh, Saudi Arabia, Saudi Arabia

Organisation
- Type: Public

Services
- Emergency department: Yes

History
- Constructed: 1984–1995
- Opened: 2004

Links
- Website: www.kfmc.med.sa

King Fahad Medical City (KFMC) is a public medical complex in Riyadh, Saudi Arabia. It consists of four hospitals: the Obstetrics & Gynecology Hospital, the Specialist Hospital, the Rehabilitation Hospital, and the Pediatric Hospital, with approximately 1200 beds. It was built at a cost of $633 million. KFMC's yearly operating budget is estimated at $150 million. KFMC forms part of the Riyadh Second Health Cluster, an integrated healthcare network serving eastern and northern Riyadh.

== History ==
The development of King Fahad Medical City (KFMC) was adopted by King Fahd bin Abdulaziz Al Saud. Salman bin Abdulaziz, then governor of Riyadh, laid its foundation stone in 1983. Construction-industry reporting describes the medical city as having been constructed between began in 1984 and 1995. The medical city was officially inaugurated in 2004 by Abdullah bin Abdulaziz, then crown prince. The medical city was named after King Fahd bin Abdulaziz Al Saud.

In December 2005, the King Salman Heart Centre was opened, providing adult and paediatric cardiac, vascular, and thoracic care.

In 2010, a cancer center was established at KFMC.

Initially, KFMC provided general and specialized medical services but gradually expanded to include advanced research, education, and training programs.In 2012, the Ministry of Health signed a SR 1.18 billion ($316 million) contract for an expansion of KFMC. The development programme included facilities for neuroscience, cancer, proton therapy, cardiovascular services, and laboratories, together with administrative buildings and a purpose-built cochlear implant centre. The expansion included an 11-storey National Neurosciences Institute and an 11-storey cancer centre.

In February 2021, KFMC introduced the EPIC electronic medical record system, following the migration of approximately 800,000 existing patient records.

The Ministry of Health introduced a diagnostic imaging public-private partnership across seven hospitals in Riyadh in 2023. As part of the arrangement, KFMC served as the hub of a teleradiology network.

In 2024, the medical city became the first facility in Saudi Arabia to receive accreditation from the International Accreditation System for Interventional Oncology Services (IASIOS).

In 2025, KFMC was ranked in Brand Finance's 2025 Global Top 250 Hospitals, placed 61st worldwide.

== Hospitals and centers ==
=== Hospitals ===
The original medical complex comprised a 459-bed Main Hospital, a 246-bed Children Specialised Hospital, a 236-bed Women Specialised Hospital, and a 159-bed Rehabilitation Hospital.

- Main Hospital

The main hospital provides medical, surgical, critical-care and dental services.

- Children Specialized Hospital

The children specialised hospital provides paediatric and neonatal care.

- Women Specialized Hospital

The women specialised hospital provides tertiary obstetric and gynaecological services.

- Rehabilitation Hospital

The rehabilitation hospital provides interdisciplinary tertiary rehabilitation services. It was first accredited by CARF International in 2010.

=== Centers ===
KFMC's principal specialist centres include:

- National Neurosciences Institute
- King Salman Heart Centre
- Comprehensive Cancer Center
- Obesity, Endocrine, and Metabolism Center

== Education and research ==
KFMC's Academic and Training Affairs administration oversees postgraduate education, continuing professional development and health-professions training. The medical city provides residency training in a range of medical and surgical specialties, including programmes.

Simulation-based education is provided through the Centre for Research, Education and Simulation Enhanced Training (CRESENT), which uses simulation technologies for clinical training. KFMC also maintains a Research Centre supporting research conducted within the medical city.

== KFMC Apps ==
iKFMC App was designed to serve patients and employees of King Fahad Medical City, as well as suppliers and other members of the community. Services provided by the app are designed to meet the needs of a broad range of users and facilitate quick and easy access to information. The medical service allows patients to access information about appointments and medications, as well as lab results, radiology, diagnoses, reports, and relatives' medical records. It also provides employees with details of their leave, salaries, and annual evaluations.

- IKFMC Apple
- IKFMC Android

Tahoor is an application for smart devices that provides educational materials for patients in Arabic and English, promoting the concept of religious culture and raising awareness of patients' religious and spiritual needs.

- Tahoor Apple

== See also ==
- List of hospitals in Saudi Arabia
