= Gerónimo Cuervo González =

Spanish architect (1838–1898)

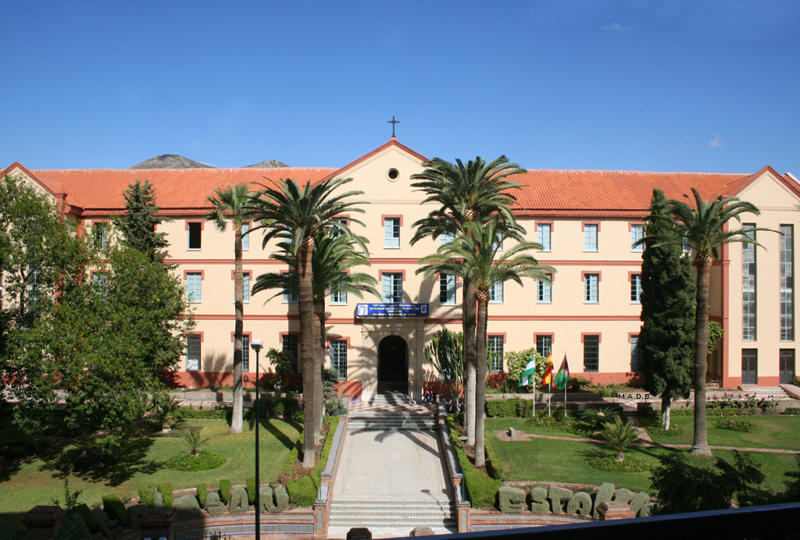
Colegio San Estanislao de Kostka.

Gerónimo Cuervo González (30 June 1838, in Madrid – 25 June 1898, in Málaga) was a Spanish architect and the designer of a number of the most iconic buildings of Malaga, among them the Cervantes Theatre (Teatro Cervantes), the Galvez Hospital (Hospital Gálvez), the Church of St. Peter (Iglesia de San Pablo), the Abbey of St. Anne (Abadía de Santa Ana), the College of St. Stanislav of Kostka (Colegio San Estanislao de Kostka), as well as a number of residential buildings, among them, those situated in Spinola Square (plaza de Spínola) and Bishop's Square (plaza del Obispo).

He was also involved in the construction of St. Michael's Cemetery (Cementerio de San Miguel) alongside other important architects of Malaga.

In 2010 reformation work began on one of his most elegant residential buildings, number 3 at Calle Marques de Guadiaro. Several years earlier the neglected building had been bought by the Iraqi-born, British architect Dr. Basil Al Bayati. In homage to Jerónimo Cuervo González, the building has now been renovated to its former glory and houses an Architectural and Cultural Centre, a bookshop, 'Basil's' cafeteria, as well as Dr. Al Bayati's architectural studios.
