= Edinburgh Central Mosque =

Mosque in Edinburgh, Scotland, United Kingdom

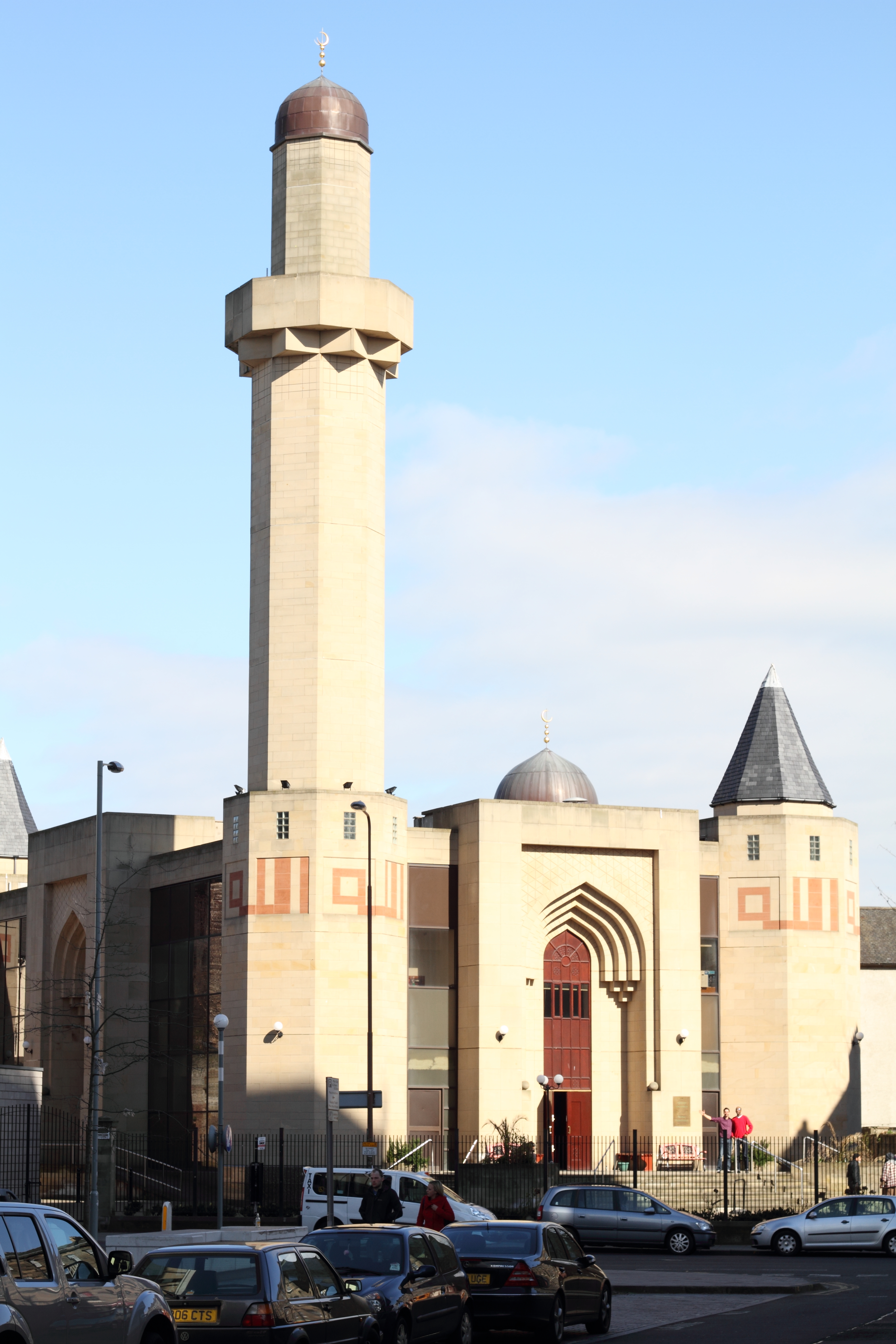

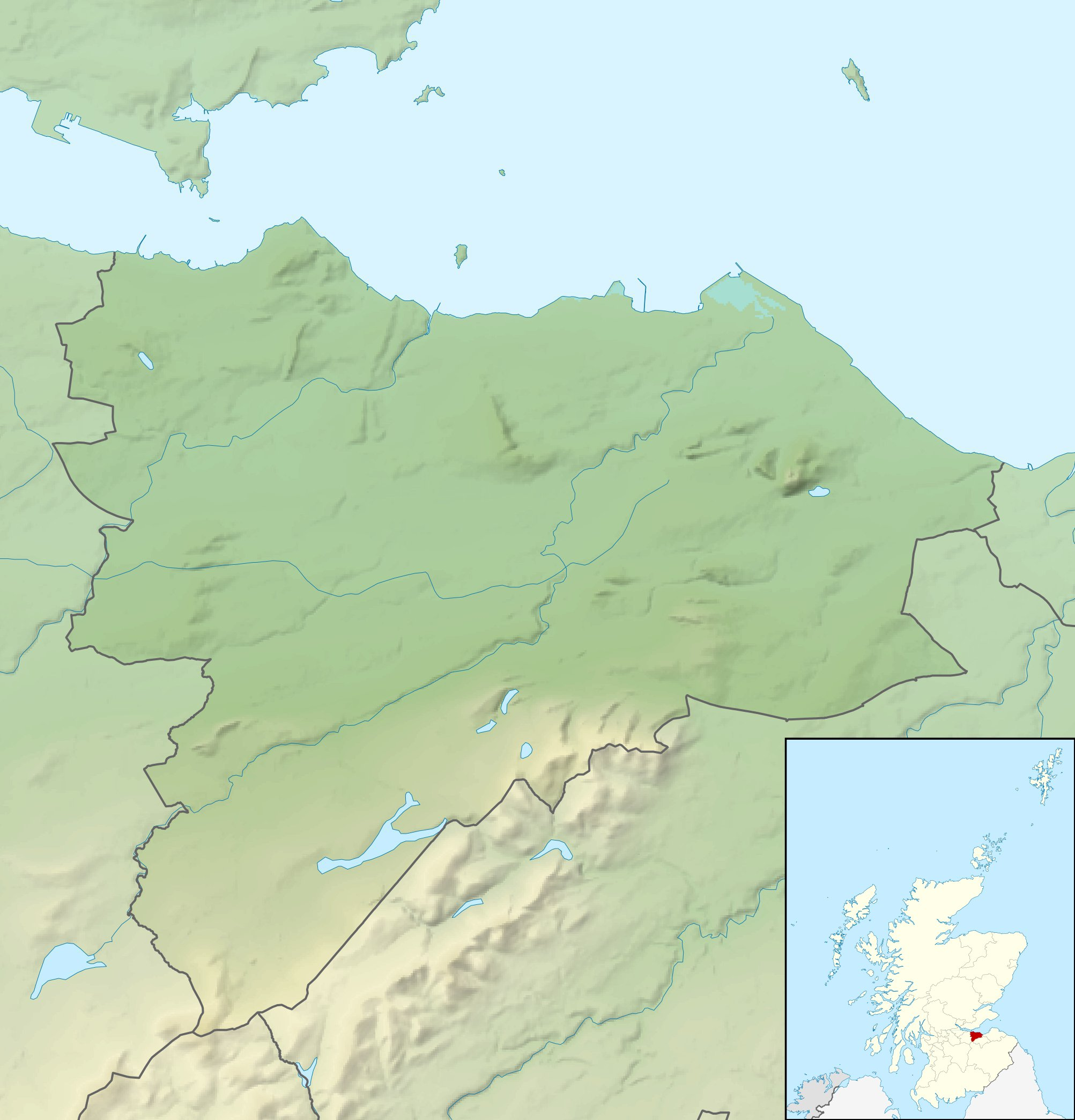
- Location of the mosque in Edinburgh

Religion
- Affiliation: Sunni Islam
- Ecclesiastical or organizational status: Mosque
- Status: Active

Location
- Location: Potterow, Edinburgh, Scotland
- Country: United Kingdom
- Interactive map of Edinburgh Central Mosque
- Coordinates: 55°56′42″N 3°11′10″W

Architecture
- Architect: Basil Al-Bayati
- Type: Mosque architecture
- Style: Modernist; Scots baronial; Islamic
- Construction cost: £3.5 million

Specifications
- Capacity: 1,250 worshippers (including women)
- Dome: Two
- Minaret: One (also 3 towers on the corners)

Website
- www.edmosque.org

The Edinburgh Central Mosque (officially known as the King Fahd Mosque and Islamic Centre of Edinburgh) is located on Potterrow near the University of Edinburgh central area and the National Museum of Scotland. The mosque and Islamic centre was designed by Dr. Basil Al Bayati, and took more than six years to complete at a cost of £3.5M. The main hall can hold over one thousand worshippers, with women praying on a balcony overlooking the hall. The mosque holds chandeliers and a vast carpet, with very little furniture.

The architecture combines traditional Islamic features with a Modernist Scots baronial style. Geza Fehervari, Professor of Islamic Art & Archaeology at London University, said "The architectural elements and decorative details, while basically relying on Islamic, mainly Turkish traditions, successfully interact with the architectural and decorative age-old customs of Scotland."

== History ==
Prior to its construction, there was no mosque large enough to fulfill the needs of the Muslims in the city centre of Edinburgh. As the Muslim population increased a large mosque became viable. Eventually, the project was able to purchase land from the City Council with the proviso that an existing listed building be preserved and used. The project ran into funding difficulties; but these were solved when King Fahd of Saudi Arabia donated 90% of the project's total cost. On 31 July 1998 (8 Rabi II 1419) the mosque was opened by his son Prince Abdulaziz bin Fahd Al Saud, who was also the project patron.

== Architecture ==
The mosque is built from stone and has calligraphy instilled in the design, facing the courtyard. The calligraphy found on the mosque is square kufic, highlighting God's name in Arabic as Allah.

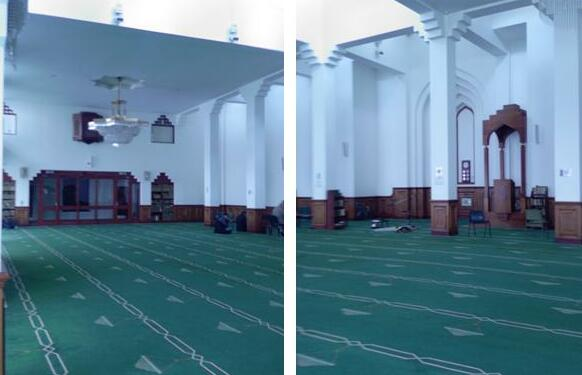
Different views of the prayer hall

The main hall is where the Friday prayer (Jumu'ah) and the five daily prayers (salat) are held. There are two chandeliers, a vast carpet, and chairs for the elderly and disabled. Many short lectures and small discussion groups are held here, although such groups must give notice. The mosque also offers funeral services and the prayer Salat al-Janazah. There are two side entrances to the hall and a small glass room which also has a separate entrance/exit with a ramp for the disabled.

There are separate ablution (wudu) rooms for both male and female. The males' contains 21 ablution washers, nine flush toilets, four Squat toilets and six sinks. As of 2010, the mosque has received additional funding and the decision has been made to upgrade the ablution facilities to accommodate more people; there will also be a separate room for the Islamic funeral process of bathing the dead body and enshrouding.

A second hall is located downstairs; it is much smaller than the main prayer hall. The room is sometimes opened for Friday prayers and Salat al Eid. The room is mainly used for storage but opens every year for the Islam Festival Edinburgh.

There is a medium-sized library that holds a large variety of Islamic books for selling and lending. The library is opened from the morning to evening. It also holds many services such as classes in Arabic and the Qur'an as well as group discussions such as the "Brother circle", since there are two medium-sized tables and chairs.

=== Mosque Kitchen ===
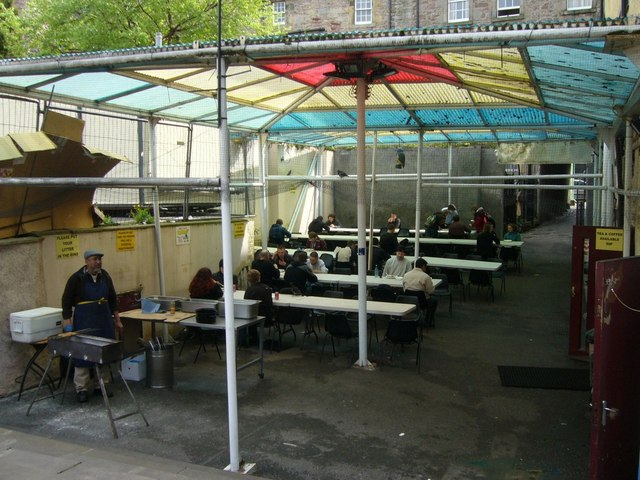
Kitchen behind the mosque.

The Mosque Kitchen (formerly called the Lunch Box) was opened to the public in 2004. It offers takeaway, outdoor tables and catering. The capacity is roughly 80–100. The menu consists of halal South Asian and Middle Eastern food, including various meat and vegetable curries, with rice or naan on the side. Barbecued chicken, shish kebabs and corn on the cob are also available on some days as well as barbecues on Saturdays. The sitting area is specially opened at Iftar time during ramadan for the Muslims opening their fast. In August 2007, The Scotsman newspaper placed the Edinburgh Central Mosque's adjoining restaurant top of their list of Best Festival Food. In Summer 2011, the team who originally ran the Mosque Kitchen left amidst a dispute with the mosque and moved to a more conventional restaurant on Nicolson Square (still called the Mosque Kitchen); the kitchen at the mosque is now run under separate management and operates as 'The Original Mosque Kitchen and Café'.

== Islam Festival Edinburgh ==
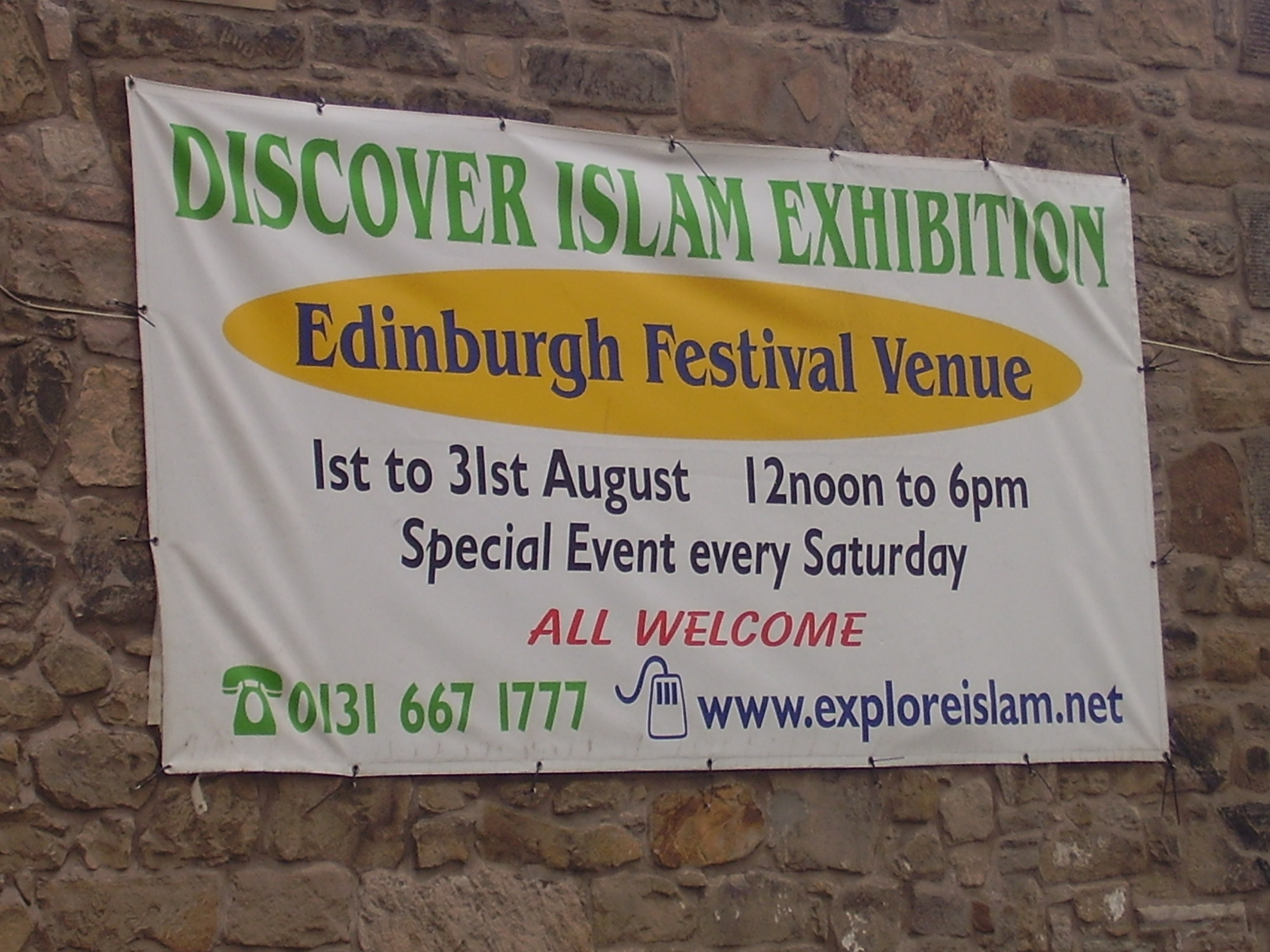
Banner of the IFE

The Islam Festival Edinburgh (IFE, and also known as the Discover Islam Exhibition) is part of the Edinburgh Festival. The mosque is opened to the public and hosts educational talks and guided tours. Usually special events are held on Saturdays, such as classes on Arabic calligraphy and presentations of Arabic art. There are also lectures from various speakers, some of whom, such as Farkhanda Chaudhry, come back each year. For example, in 2007 Chaudhry gave a talk on "Women and Islam" and in 2009 he spoke on "Women, Islam and Liberation". Similarly, Idris Tawfiq has presented "Who's afraid of Sharia law?" and "The Muslim Jesus" several times. Well-known people have visited the exhibition, including the First Minister's advisors, and MPs including Sir Menzies Campbell.

== Minority Ethnic Health Inclusion Project (MEHIP) ==
The mosque has been recognised for their collaborations with the Minority Ethnic Health Inclusion Project (MEHIP) who wanted to start a health education program. The health fair was organised by multiple organisations and hosted at the Edinburgh Central Mosque in November 2002 (during Ramadan). This pilot fair was the first of its kind and created trust between the ethnic community and health officials.

== Gallery ==
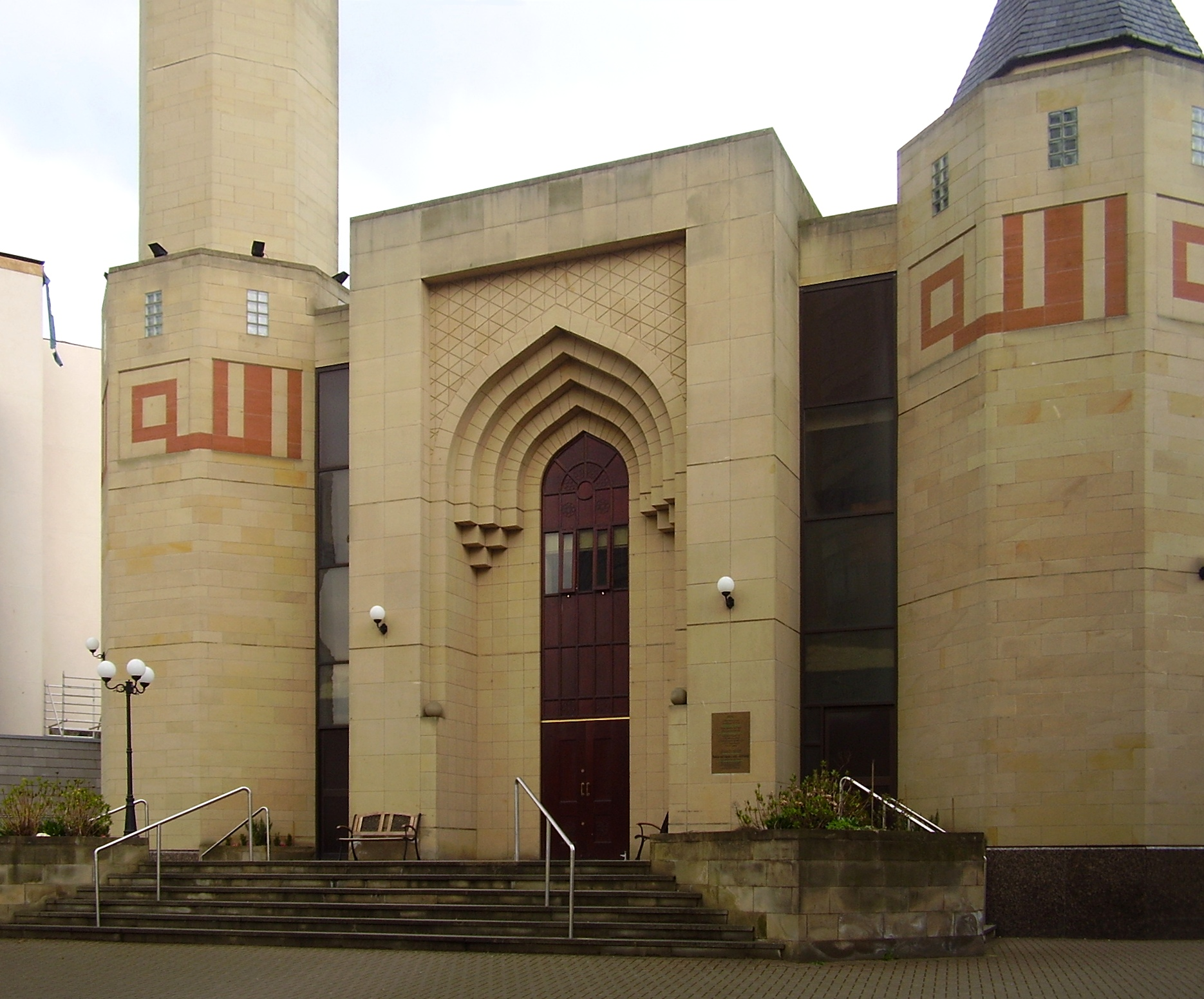
Front entrance

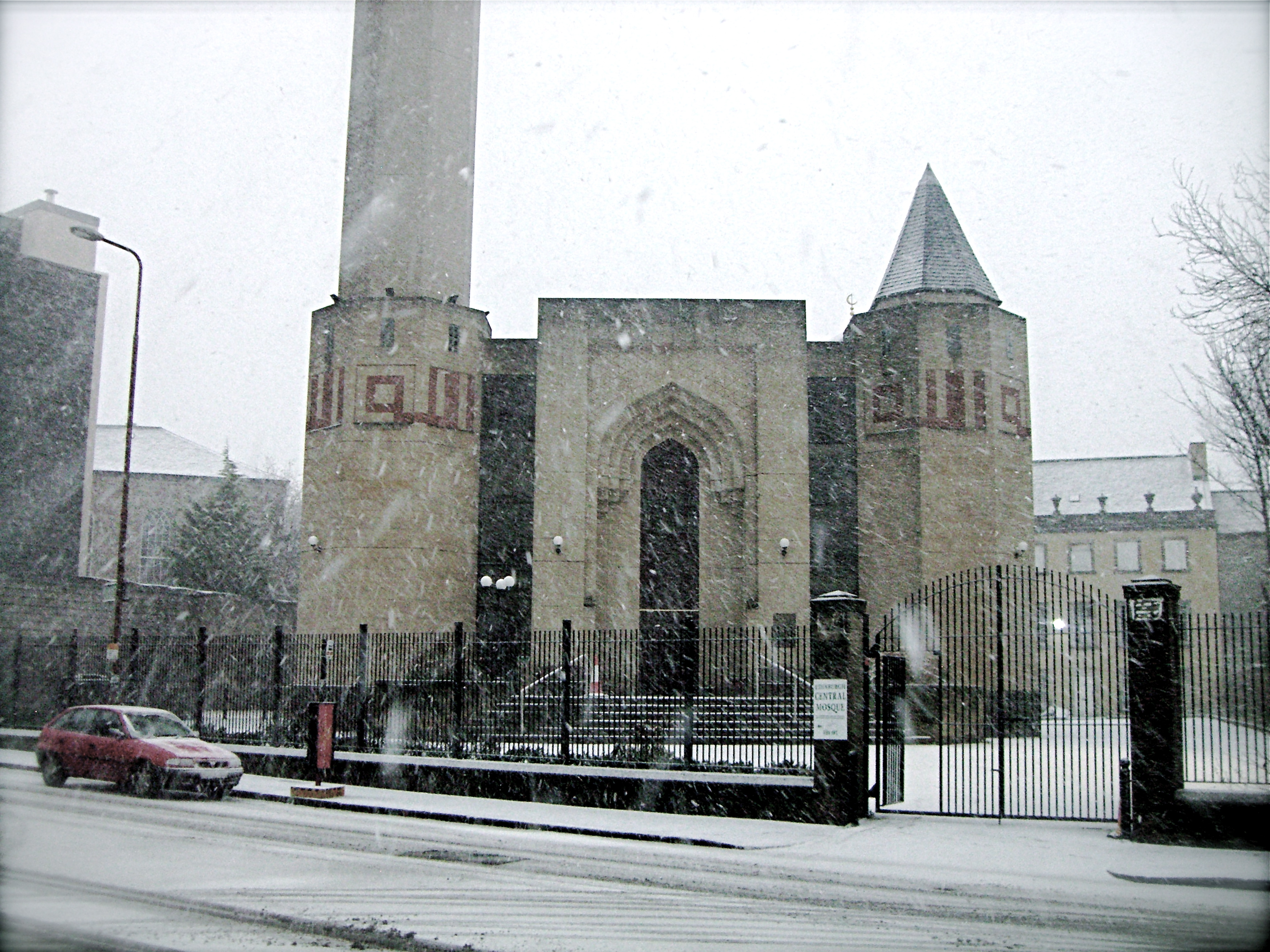
Snow in December 2009

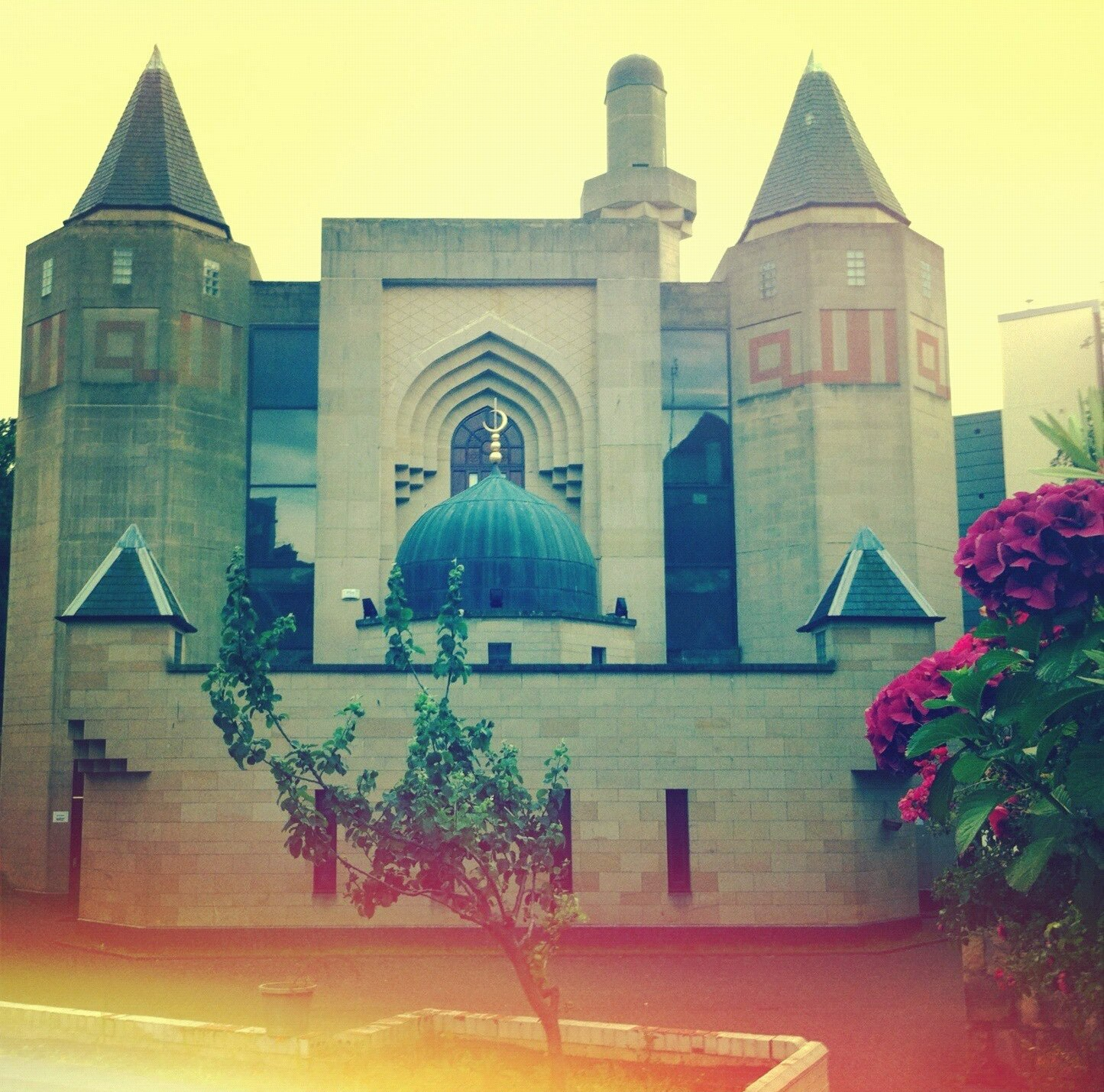
Back entrance

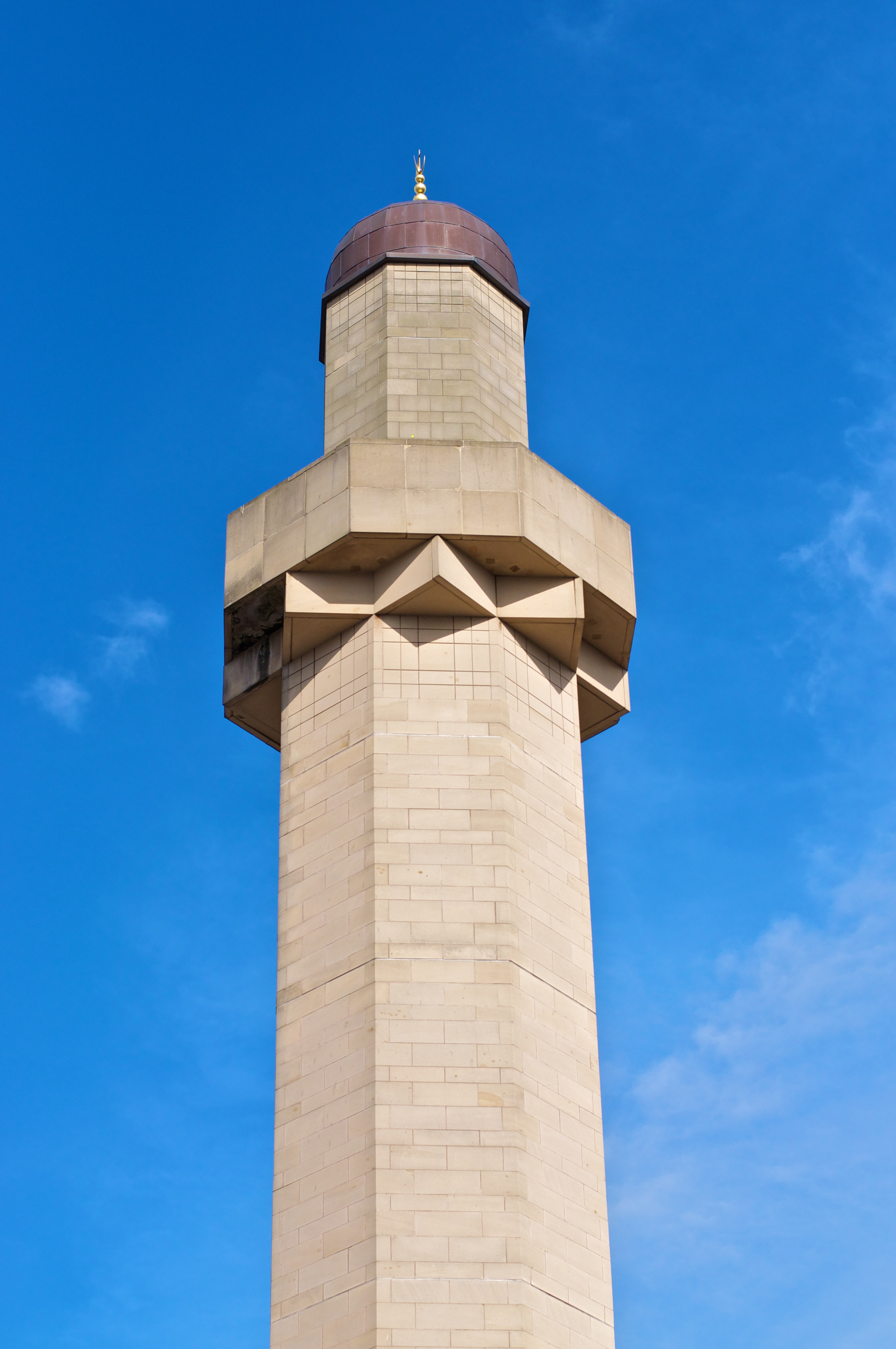
Minaret

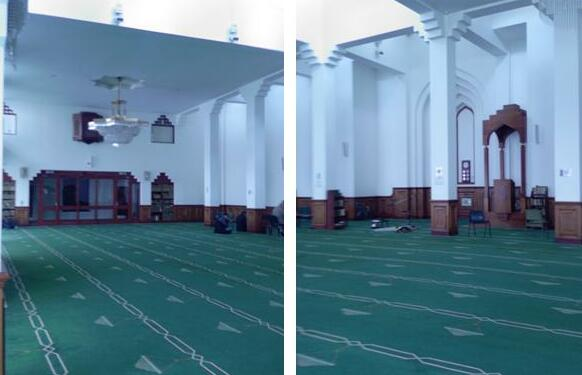
Interior

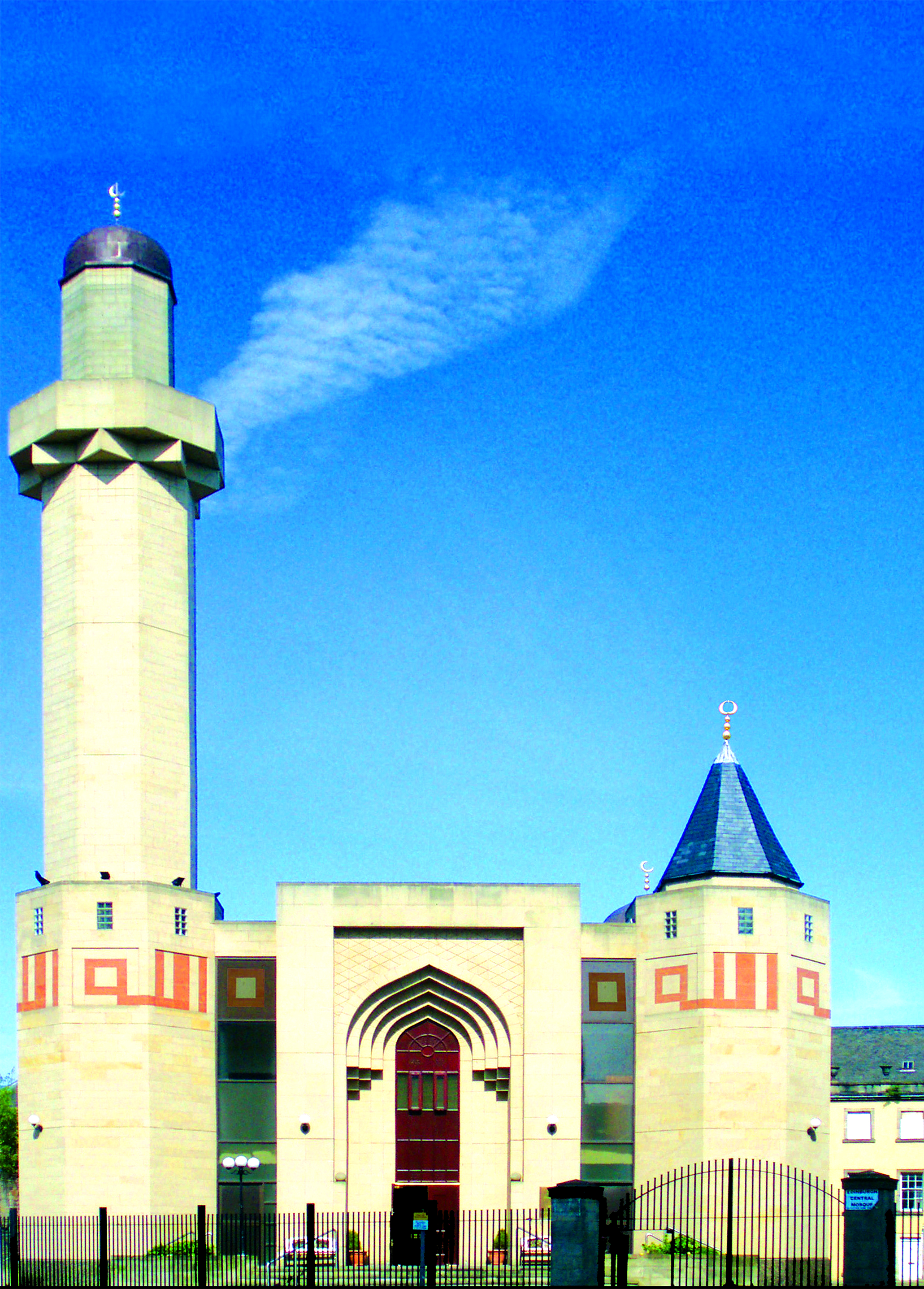
Front courtyard

== See also ==
- Islam in the United Kingdom
- List of mosques in the United Kingdom
- List of things named after Saudi kings
