= Metaphoric architecture =

20th-century architectural movement

Metaphoric architecture is an architectural movement that developed in Europe during the mid-20th century.

It is considered by some to be merely an aspect of postmodernism whilst others consider it to be a school in its own right and a later development of expressionist architecture.

The style is characterised by the use of analogy and metaphor as the primary inspiration and directive for design. Well known examples of this can be found in the Palm Mosque at the King Saud University in Riyadh by Basil Al Bayati, based upon the form of a palm tree, the Lotus Temple in New Delhi, by Fariborz Sahba, based on a lotus flower, the TWA Flight Center building in New York City, by Eero Saarinen, inspired by the form of a bird's wing, or the Sydney Opera House, in Australia, by Jørn Utzon that is derived from the sails of ships in the harbour.

Certain architects have also been known to utilise metaphors as a theme throughout their work such as Le Corbusier and the open hand motif. This to him was a sign of "peace and reconciliation. It is open to give and open to receive."

Perhaps the most prominent voice of the Metaphoric architectural school at present is Dr. Basil Al Bayati whose designs have been inspired by trees and plants, snails, whales, insects, dervishes and even myth and literature. He is also the founder of the International School of Metaphoric Architecture in Málaga, Spain.

== Metaphoric architects ==
- Basil Al Bayati
- Le Corbusier
- Jørn Utzon
- Eero Saarinen
- Fariborz Sahba

== Gallery ==
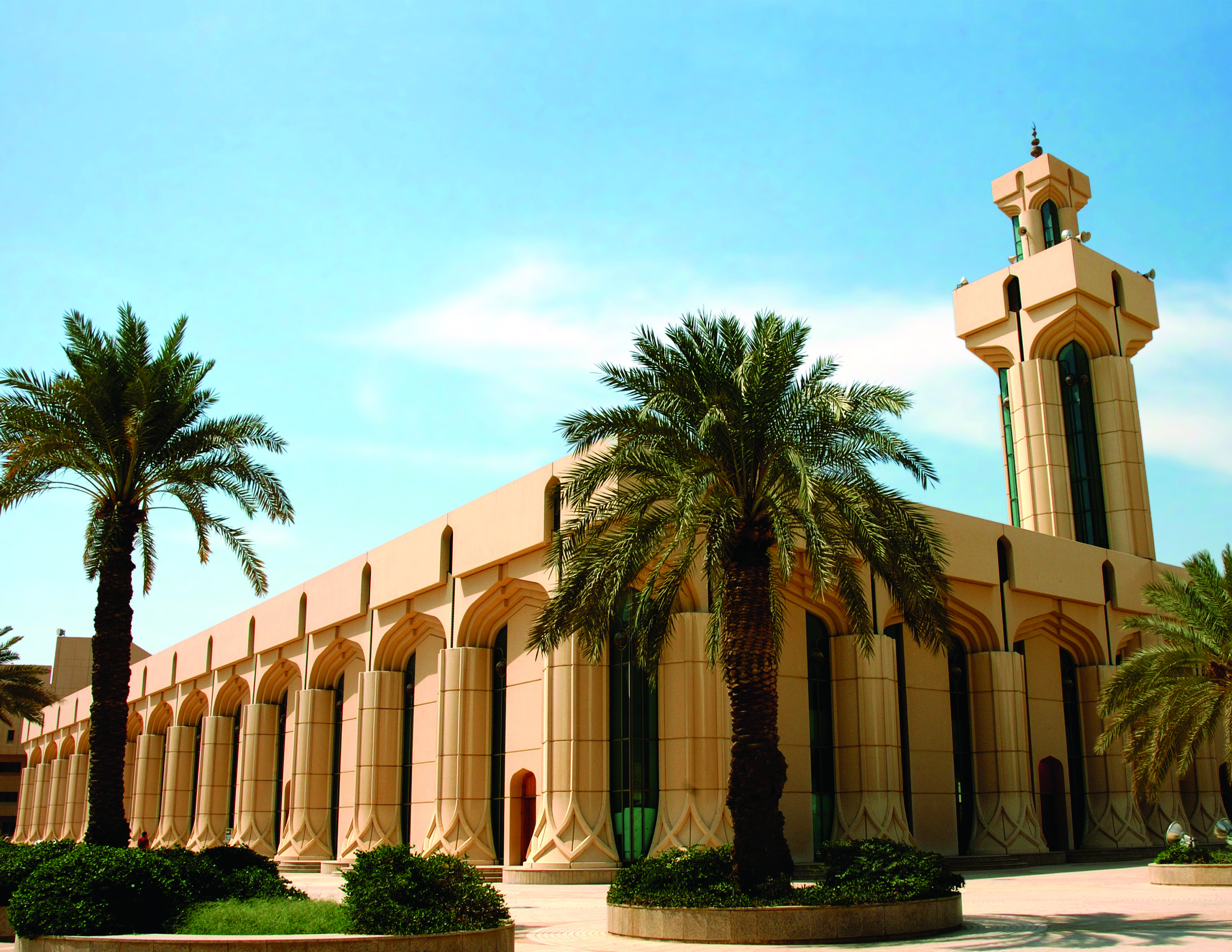
The Palm Mosque at King Saud University, Riyadh

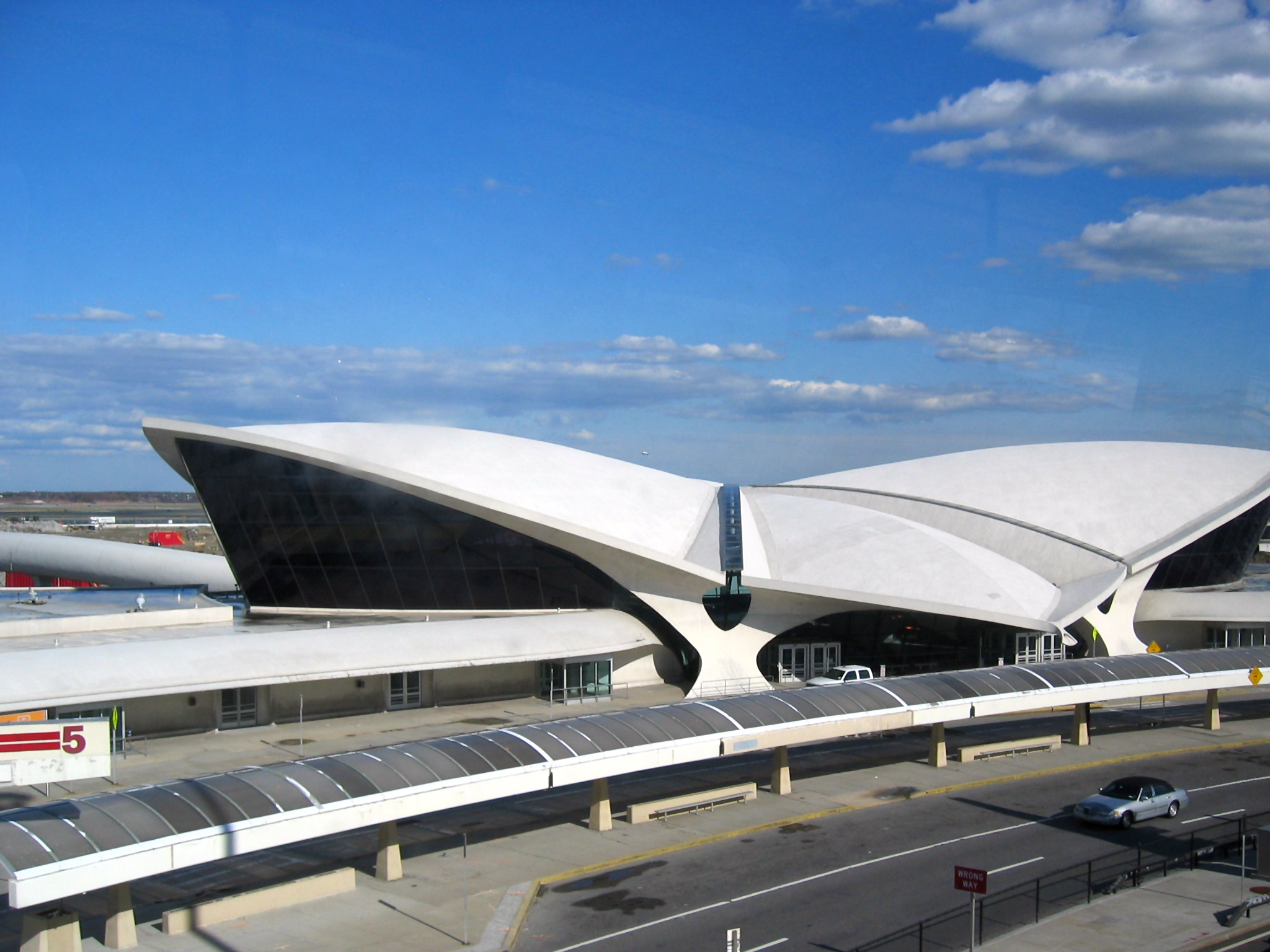
TWA Flight Centre, New York

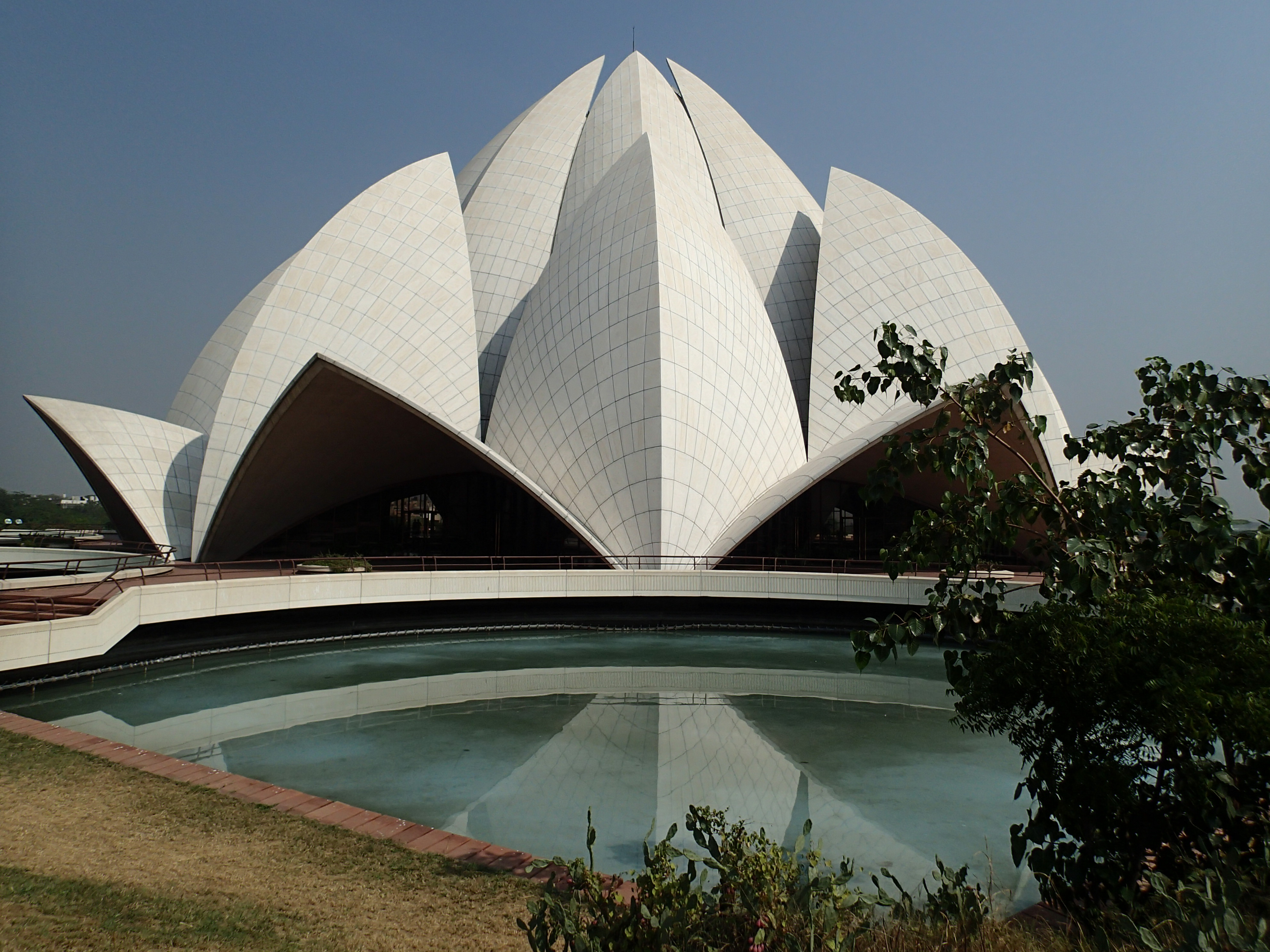
Lotus Temple, New Delhi

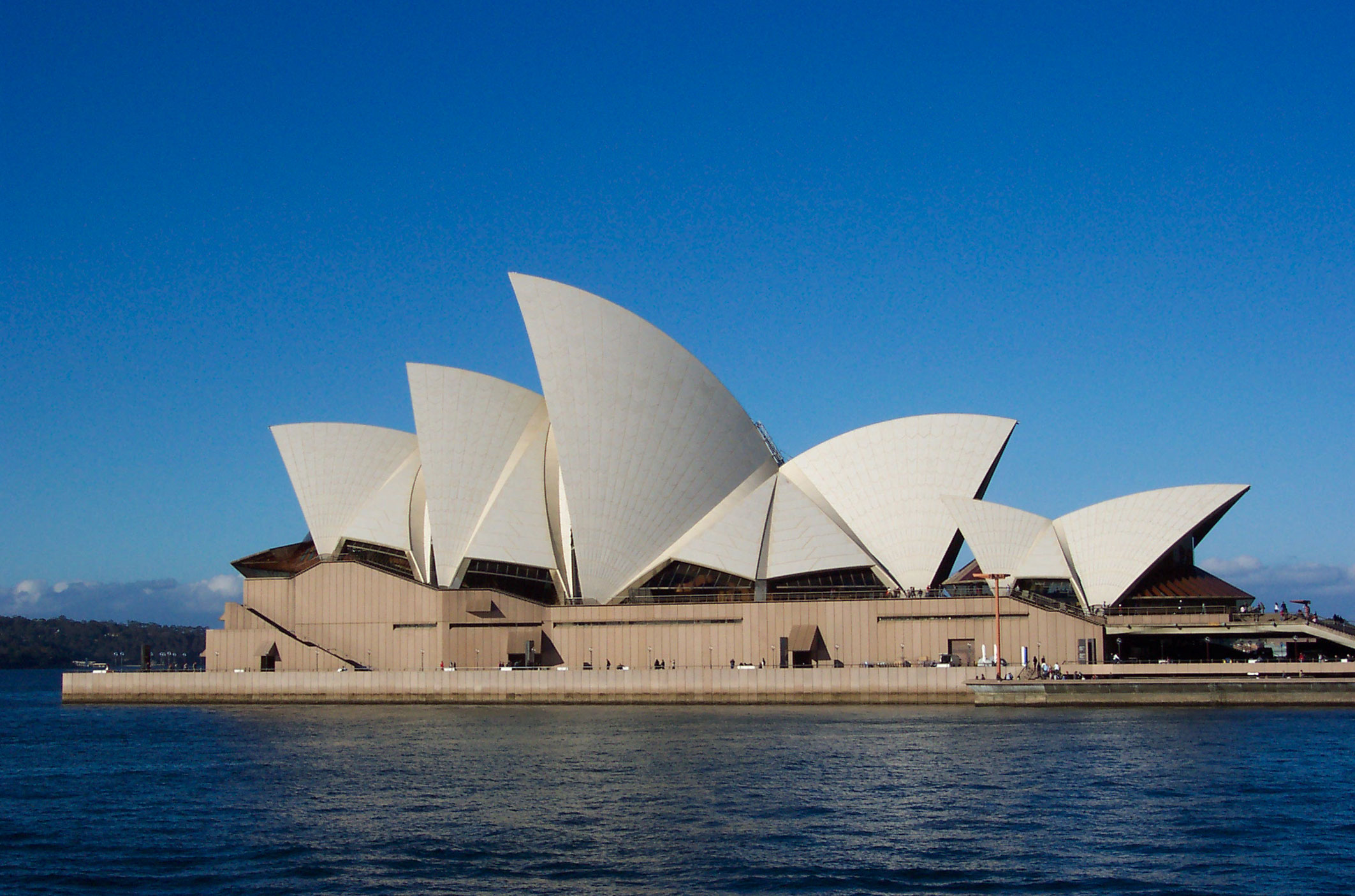
Sydney Opera House, Australia

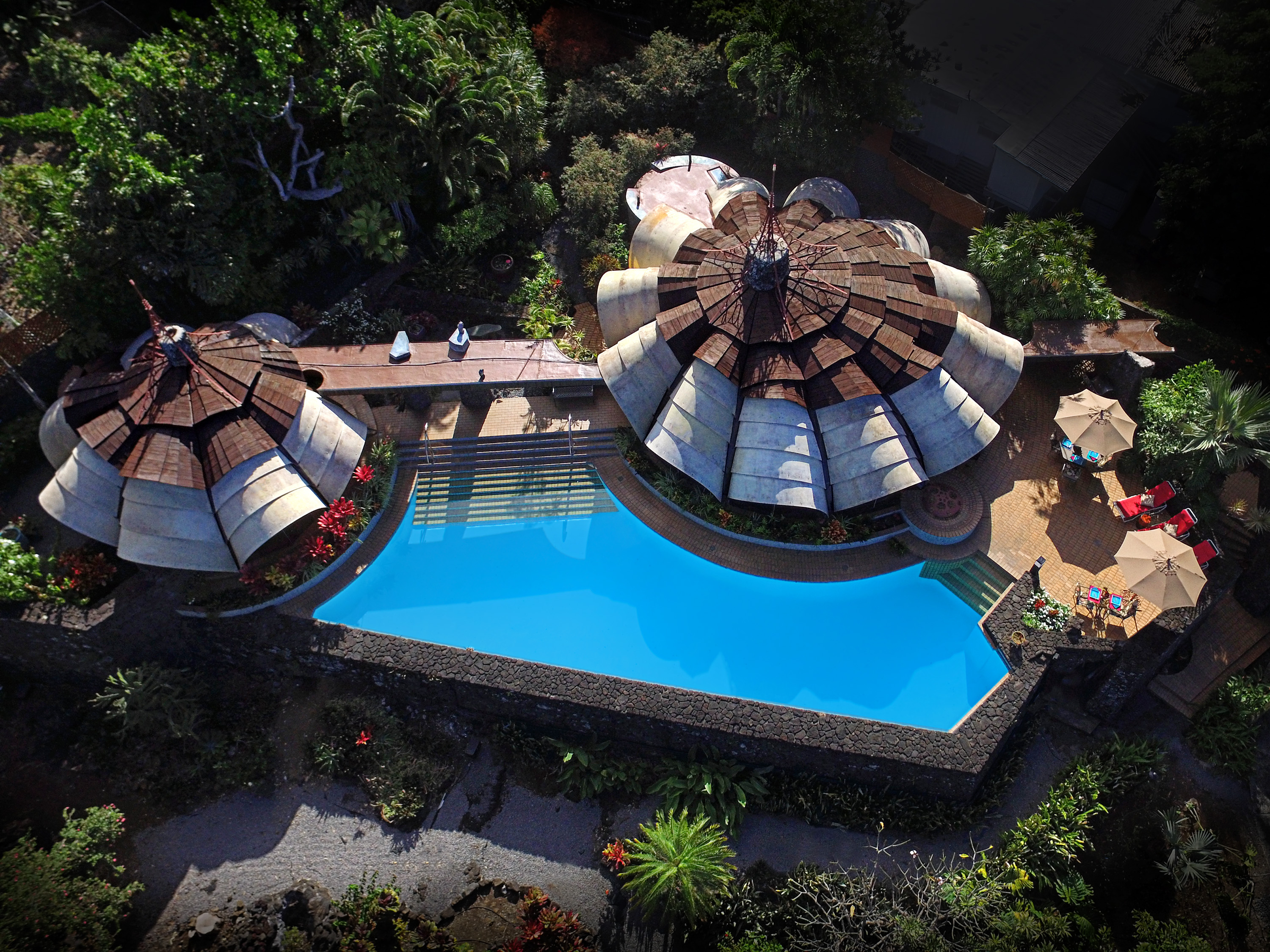
The Onion House, Hawaii
