= Basil Al Bayati =

Iraqi architect

Basil Al Bayati باسل البياتي
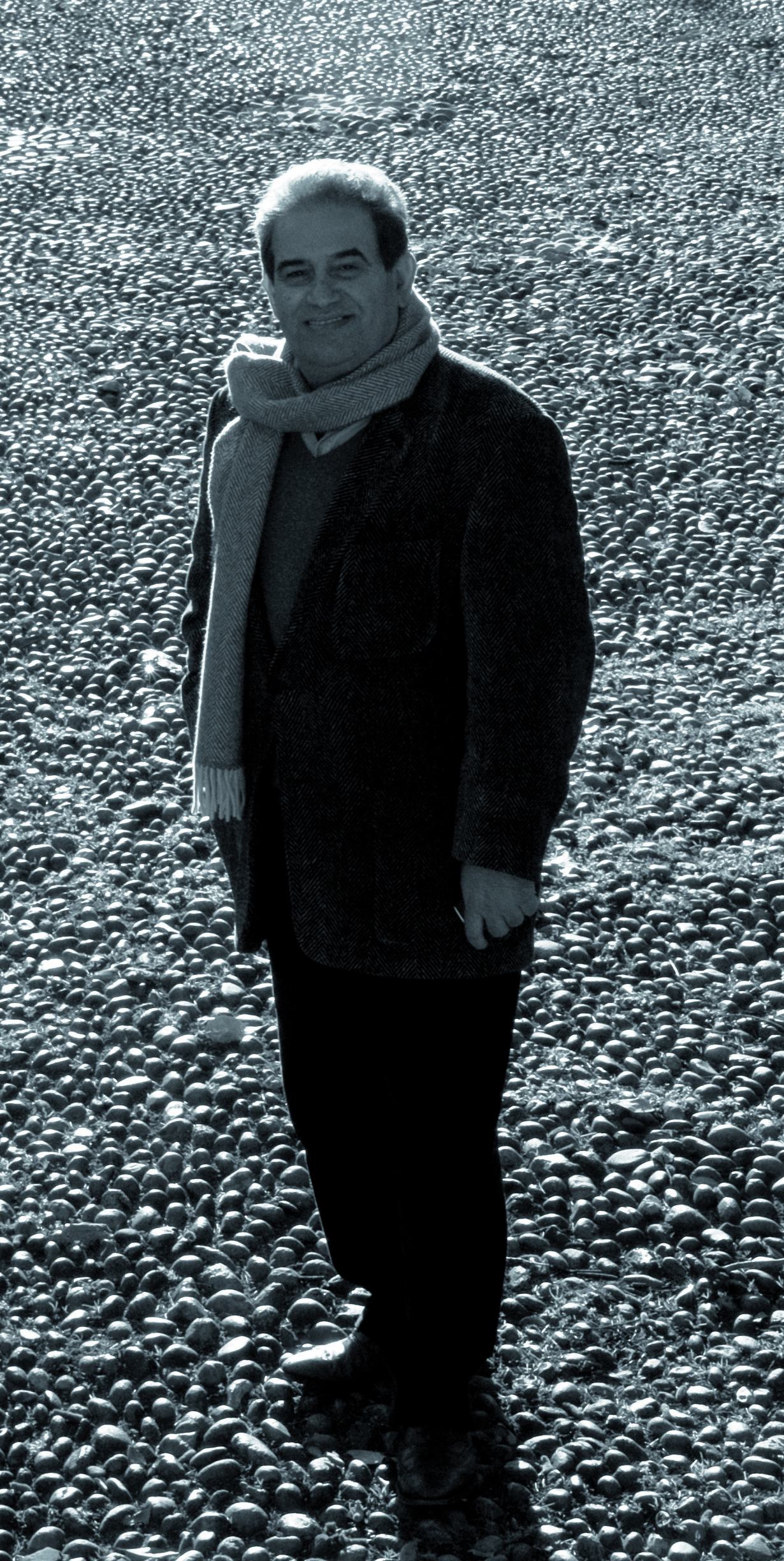
- Born: Basil Younis Rasheed Al Bayati; 13 May 1946; Baghdad, Iraq
- Education: University of Baghdad, University of London
- Occupation: Architect
- Awards: King Saud University main Mosque Competition first prize, Abu Dhabi City Competition third prize, Las Terrenas Architectural Competition Honourable Mention, MECO Architectural Competition First Prize
- Buildings: Edinburgh Central Mosque, Palm Mosque King Saud University

Basil Al Bayati (Arabic: باسل البياتي; born 13 May 1946) is an Iraqi-born architect and designer who has lived and practiced for the most part in Europe, in particular, London and who Neil Bingham, in his book 100 Years of Architectural Drawing: 1900–2000, has described as "an architect in whom East meets West." Al Bayati is considered to be one of the most important names in metaphoric architecture, an area he was at the forefront of pioneering, which uses analogy and metaphor as a basis for architectural inspiration as well as the "exploration of geometric and design patterns found in nature" .

He is also the inventor of what he termed "the mechanism of the wasitah (or excitor apparatus)" a geometric feedback mechanism for generating form and a method he himself often uses in the design process.

Throughout his almost 50 years working in the field of architecture, he has also designed furniture and artistic pieces for the household using such varied techniques as metalwork, inlay, glass and ceramic work and stonework as well as authoring nine books, principally on architecture but also fantasy/fiction and autobiography.

"His work is manifested in plans and publications that express an exuberance for visual forms rare in the Arab world today…… His projects encompass a wide variety of architectural possibilities and transcend generally accepted patterns……. In all of his buildings an organic obsession with flower forms and old Islamic symbolism has been merged into a fantastic alternative architecture for the future."

He currently resides in Málaga in the South of Spain where he runs a successful architectural practice and cultural centre as well as continuing his writing.

== Early life and education ==
Basil Al Bayati was born on 13 May 1946 in the neighbourhood of Adhamiyah in Baghdad, the sixth of ten children.

He began his architectural studies in the Faculty of Architecture at the College of Engineering, University of Baghdad, under the guidance of Dr. Mohamed Makiya. Soon afterwards he became a member of the Iraqi Engineering Union, the Society of Iraqi Architects and the Society of Kuwaiti Engineers.

In 1970 he moved to London to continue his studies and once there, was granted a British Council Scholarship to attend University College London, School of Environmental Studies, Development Planning Unit, studying under Professor Patrick Wakely before attending the Architectural Association School of Architecture, where he worked with Paul Oliver, Geoffrey Broadbent and John Chris Jones. At the A.A he received a diploma in the post-graduate course of ‘Design Method and Creative Process’. From here he continued his research into the psychology of creativity with Andrew Szmidla and spent a year researching structural engineering with Paul Regan before acquiring a BSc (Bachelor of Science) in Professional Practice from the Polytechnic of Central London in 1978. Later that same year he was registered with the Architects Registration Board (ARB) and in 1980 he was elected into corporate membership of the Royal Institute of British Architects (RIBA). In 1981 he became a Fellow (F.F.B) of the Faculty of Building (now known as the Forum for the Built Environment), in 1982 was elected member of the Incorporated Association of Architects and Surveyors, IAAS (now known as the Chartered Association of Building Engineers) as well as the British Institute of Interior Design (BIID).

In 1986, he was awarded the title of Doctor of Philosophy from University of London, School of Oriental and African Studies (SOAS) for his studies into Islamic architecture.

Having completed his doctorate, Al Bayati spent time travelling and studying various types of indigenous architecture around the world, in particular in India, China and the Near and Middle East and on his return he was elected a Fellow of the Royal Geographical Society (RGS) as well as the Royal Asiatic Society (RAS), the British Society for Middle Eastern Studies (BRISMES), and the Society for Moroccan Studies.

== Career ==
Having graduated from the University of Baghdad, he opened his first practice, Basil Al Bayati & Partners, which he opened in Baghdad with a branch in Basra.

In 1970 he moved to London to continue his studies and whilst studying, worked in a number of architectural practices before becoming the Middle East Consultant at Fitzroy Robinson & Partners. Here, in the mid-70s, he worked on a project to redevelop the White City Stadium, as well as a Liverpool Street/Broad Street redevelopment comprising a railway terminal, shops, offices, hotel and civic amenities. In the late 70s he opened his first practice in London, Basil Al Bayati Architect, at 9 Montpellier Street, opposite Harrods, in Knightsbridge, London.

In 1983, he moved his offices to an old mill that he had restored and renovated on Miller's Way in Shepherd's Bush. This became for him the busiest time in his career so far and was a highly creative period for him, designing and renovating buildings in both London as well as throughout the Middle East. Much of his work at this time was also published in several books, the most notable being 'Basil Al Bayati: Architect' and 'Basil Al Bayati: Recent Works', the results of a fruitful relationship with Andreas Papadakis, of Academy Editions.

In 2003, he relocated his offices to what was already his private studio at St. Paul's Studios, 141 Talgarth Road – in one of the famous artist studios designed by Frederick Wheeler in 1890.

In 2008, he moved to Málaga in Spain. There he acquired a five-storey listed building at Calle Marques de Guadiaro 3, designed by Jerónimo Cuervo, the Spanish architect responsible for a number of Málaga's most iconic buildings. Shortly afterwards, work began on the full renovation of the building into an architectural centre, as well as the centre for his on-going architectural practice.

According to Jim Antoniou, "he has created an architecture based on stark symbols and historical notions which utilise geometric patterns ranging from square courtyards to domed ziggurats; reproduced objects in exaggerated size, from open books to tall palm trees; and explored technology from giant balloons to Islamic space shuttles. In undertaking all these projects, Al-Bayati has shown an ability to translate the significance of symbols into dynamic and workable buildings, while retaining the simplicity of his original concept. This is partly because his work is based on thoughtful research, and partly because he is able to give shape and form to what are essentially simplistic notions. He is thus able to create architecture with all the inherent qualities and perceptions of workable buildings. For although his buildings are based on simple concepts and often presented on an exaggerated scale, his attention to detail allows builders to remain not too distant from his unusual designs."

== Notable works ==
=== Great Mosque of Edinburgh, 1987 ===
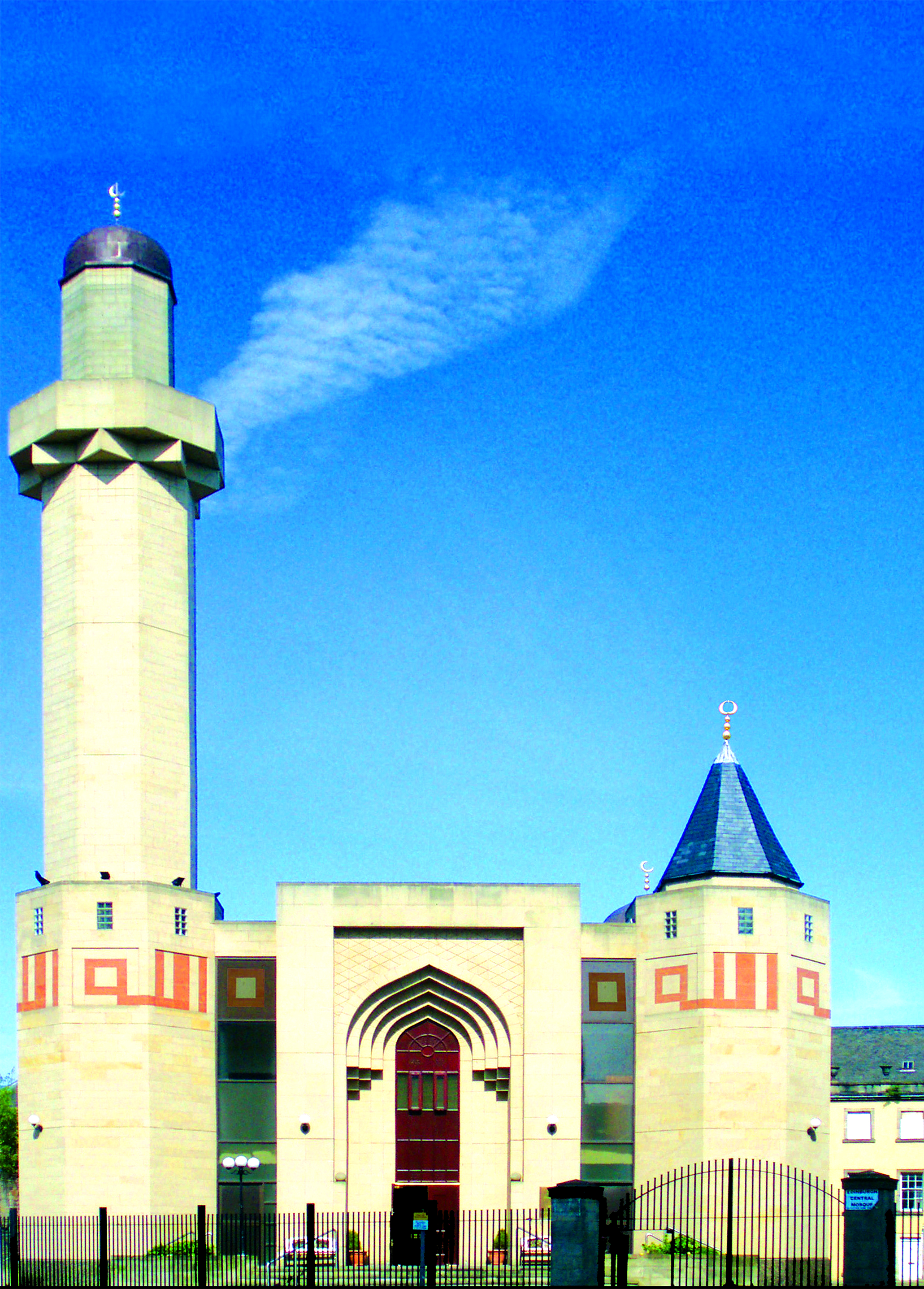
Great Mosque of Edinburgh

Al Bayati is known in particular for the Great Mosque of Edinburgh, also known as the Edinburgh Central Mosque of which, Geza Fehervari, Professor of Islamic Art & Archaeology at London University, has said "The architectural elements and decorative details, while basically relying on Islamic, mainly Turkish traditions, successfully interact with the architectural and decorative age-old customs of Scotland."

"Al-Bayati’s detailed scheme will combine the calligraphic texts of mosque architecture with a chequered motif subtly derived from plaid-tartan."

=== The Palm Mosque, (Jama’a Al-Nakheel) King Saud University, Riyadh, 1984. ===
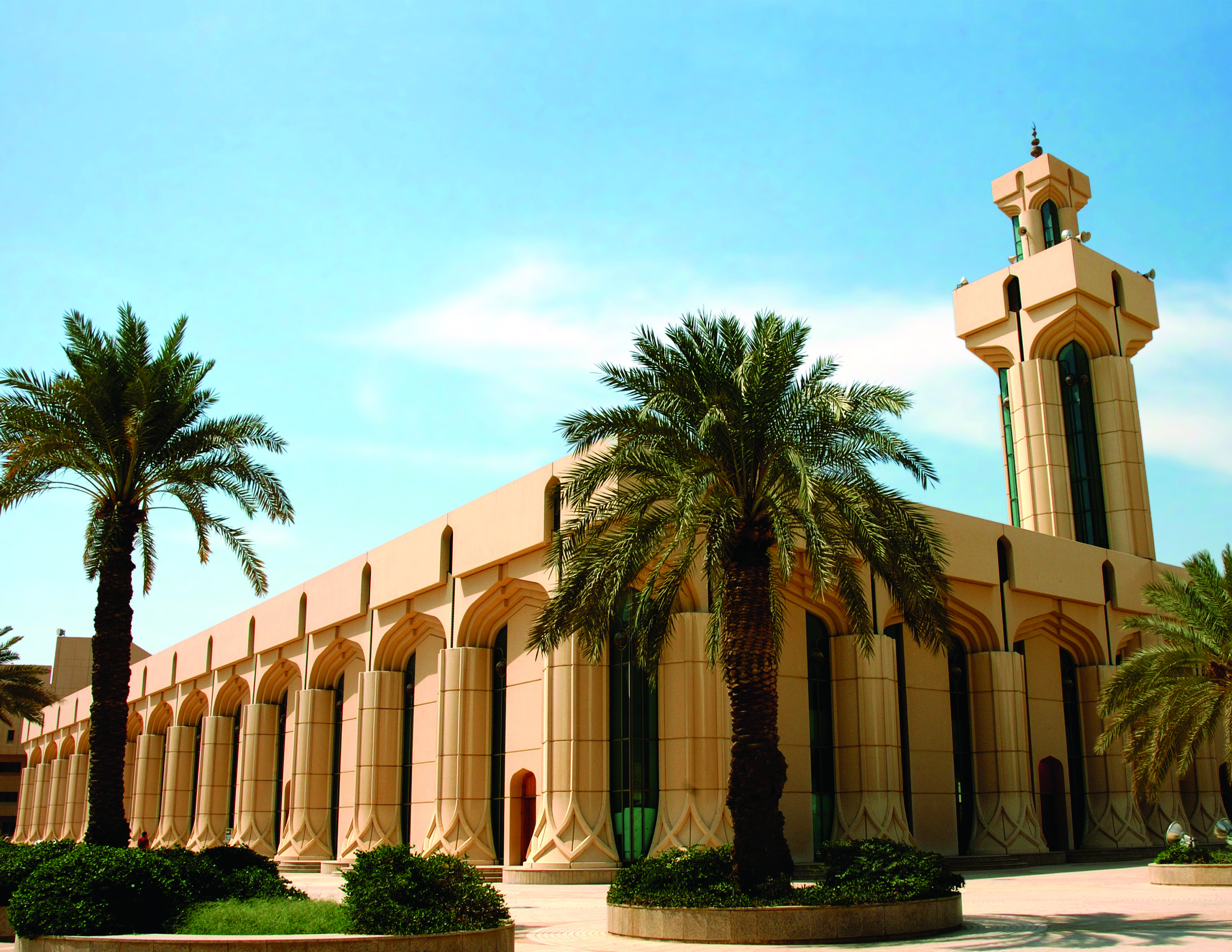
The Palm Mosque at King Saud University, Riyadh

In 1982, Al Bayati won the 1st prize in the King Saud Competition to build the main mosque for the university. His design incorporated extensively the motif of the palm trunk, as used in the very first Mosque of the Prophet in Medina. It was highly praised and was even claimed to "mark the beginning of a new era, a new revival in Islamic architecture."

The interior calligraphy above the doors and in the mihrab was done by Ghani Alani, the last of the Baghdad School of Calligraphy. He was a student of Hashem al-Khattat. Ghani Alani taught Dr. Bayati whilst at the College of Engineering in Baghdad. The building was also nominated for the 1992 Aga Khan Award for Architecture.

=== King Saud University Entrance Gate, (Faith & Knowledge), Riyadh ===
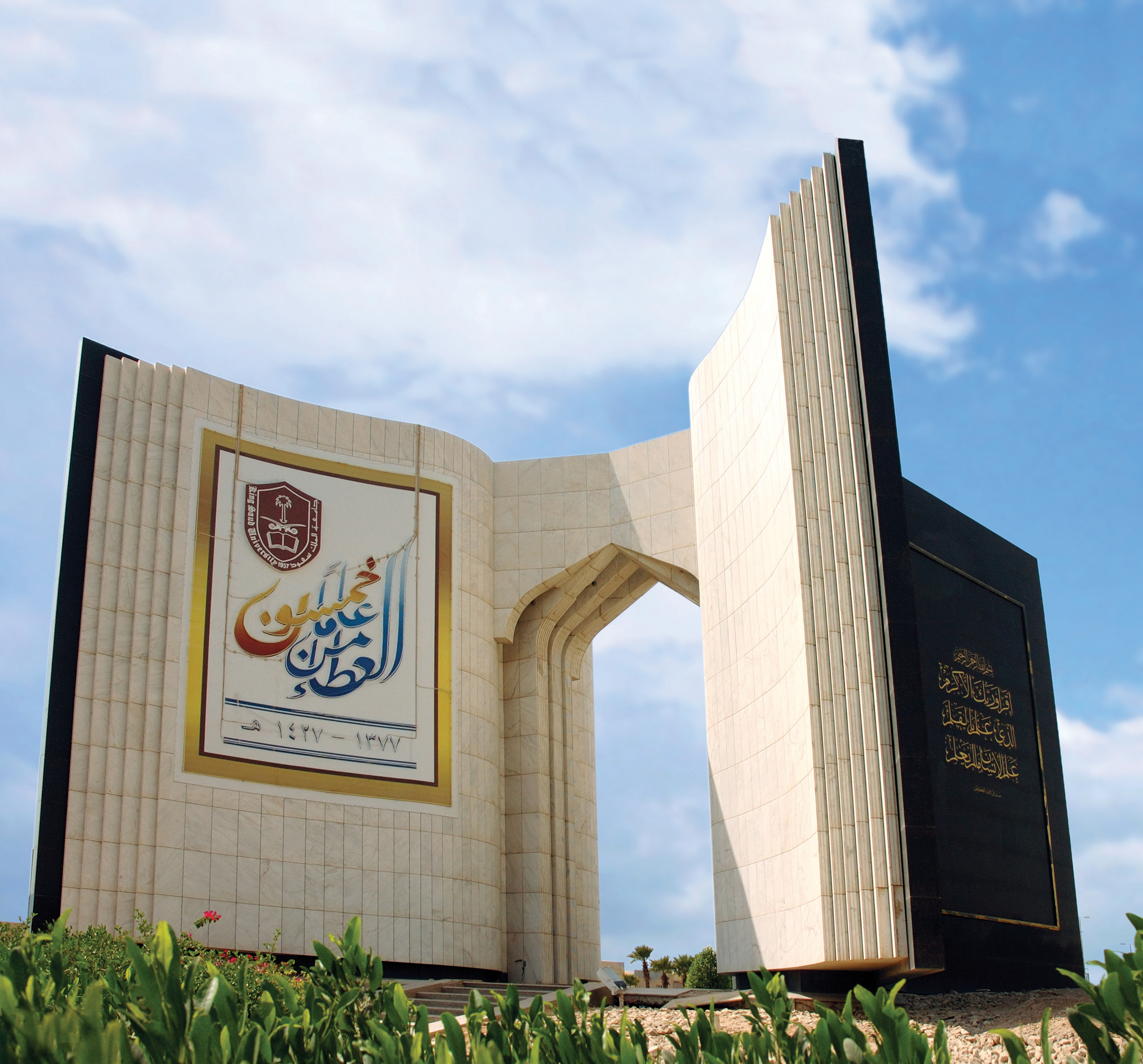
King Saud University Entrance Gate, Riyadh

Dr. Bayati's design for the entrance gates to the King Saud University is based upon the theme of faith and knowledge; two pillars of Islam that must be taken together, "Knowledge cannot do without faith nor can faith ignore knowledge for Islam calls always for faith and knowledge to run in parallel."

"The design consists of two books representing knowledge and faith. They have been so placed so that their pages are interlocked thus showing the close connection between faith and knowledge. Verses from the Quran on faith and knowledge are written in beautiful script on the cover of each book."

=== Church Island House, Staines, 1987 ===
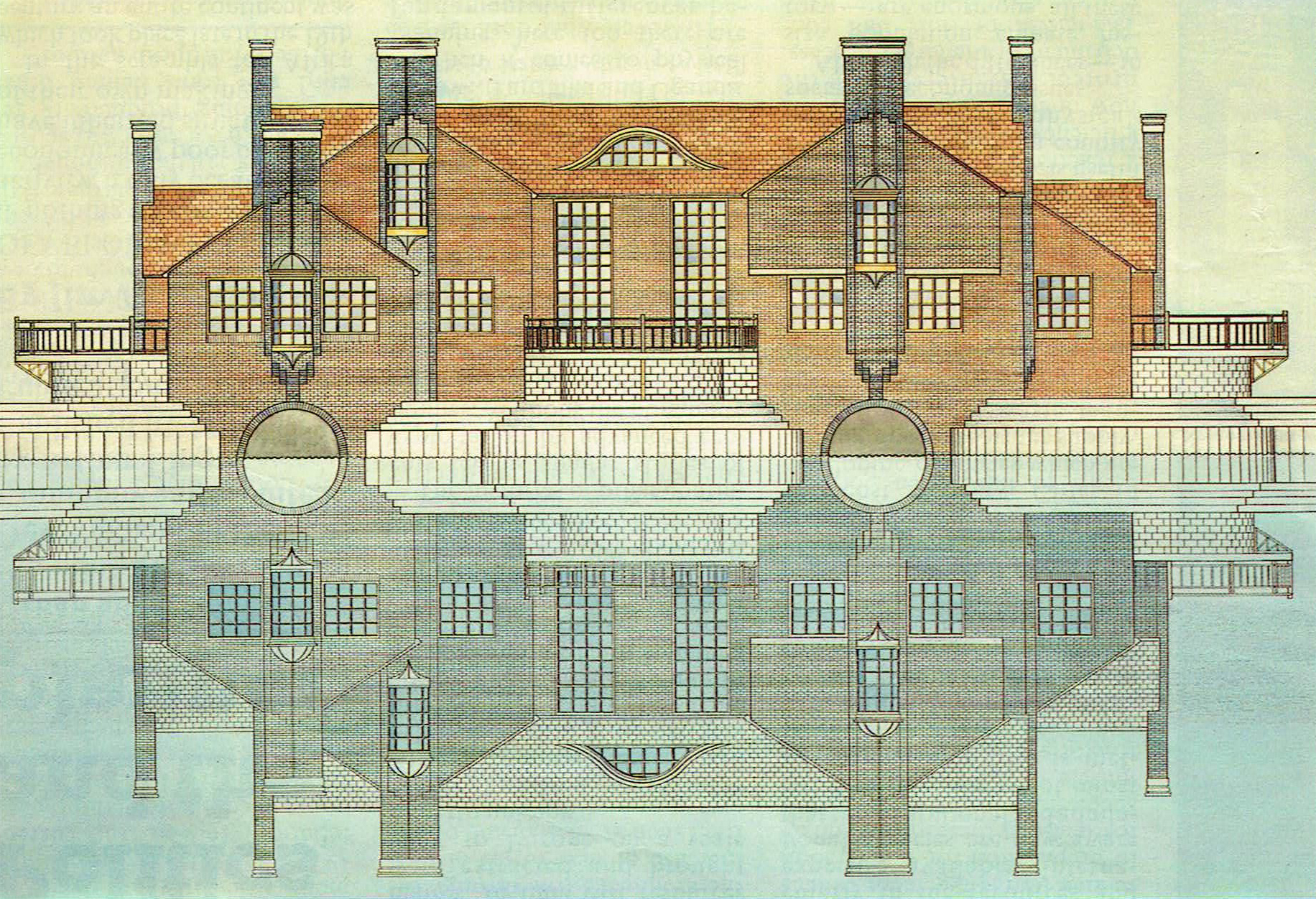
Church Island House in the Thames, Staines

Church Island House was a building commissioned by the publisher of Academy Editions and Architectural Design magazine, Andreas Papadakis.

"For his luxury mansion on his Greek-island-in-the-Thames, the great man chose not Michael Graves, one of the deconstructivists or even CZWG, but pragmatic classicist Basil Al Bayati, whom he instructed to design a country house in the English turn-of-the-century manner." The plan of the house is based on multiple units of structural geometrical forms and utilises extensive brickwork in a postmodern, art & craft style. It was "designed in a vernacular manner, using building materials similar to those traditionally used in the area."

In 1988, Church Island House was exhibited at the German Architecture Museum in Frankfurt in an exhibition titled The Architecture of Pluralism that included work by James Gowan, Terry Farrell, Charles Jencks and some twenty other internationally recognised architects.

=== Hyde Park Gate Mews, London, 1990 ===
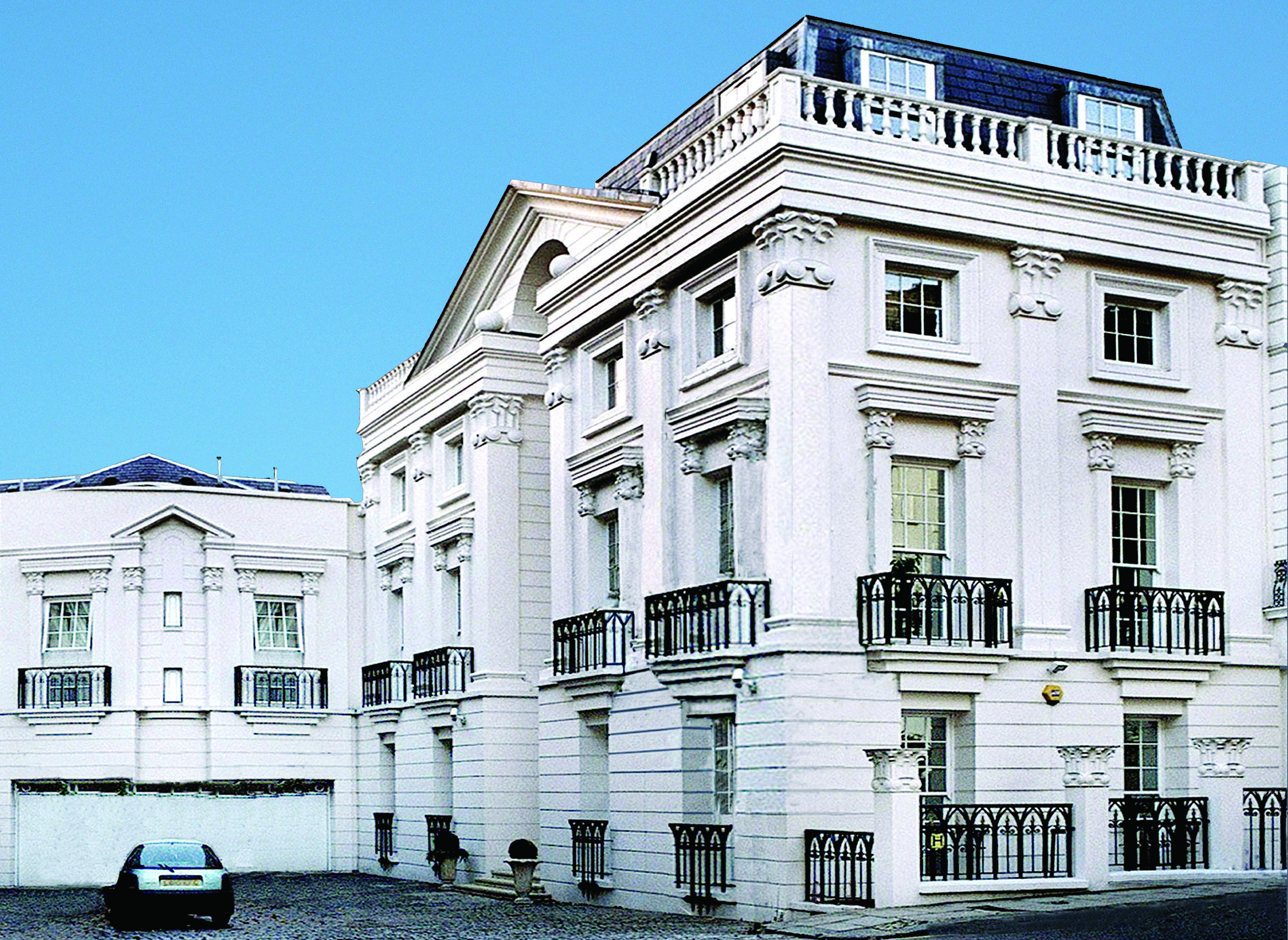
Hyde Park Gate Mews, London

This building reflects the more classical side of Al Bayati's architecture and is a four-storey post-modern classical townhouse in the heart of Kensington. Architectural Design magazine wrote of him and this work: "He is steeped in the history of Islamic architecture, and deeply inspired by Persian tomb-towers, Cairo Mosques, Moghul palaces etc. He is also, however, motivated by Western Classicism, in for example his project for Park Gate, London, drawn from the Classical ordering system of proportion, as well as the use of columns and mansard roofs."

The building can be seen as part of The Decorative Arts Society architectural walk – A Walk Around and About ‘Albertopolis’.

=== Oriental Village by the Sea, Dominican Republic, 1988 ===
The Oriental village by the sea "is based upon Oriental building types arranged in a plan originating in patterns of insect and plant life. The exoskeleton of a dragonfly forms the main body of the building’s layout, its triangular mouth of stairs on the waterfront leading to the creature’s circular head of the entrance lobby. The insect’s long segmented yellow body is the central corridor, dome-lit, which intertwines with a branch of a tree, its stem a road and its leaves the roofs of condominiums and leisure facilities. The colourful berries are cone-topped villas intended to be reminiscent of Chinese temples."

This design was awarded the runner-up position and an honourable mention in the 1988, Las Terrenas Competition for Architecture.

=== Tomb of Gul Baba, Budapest, 1987 ===
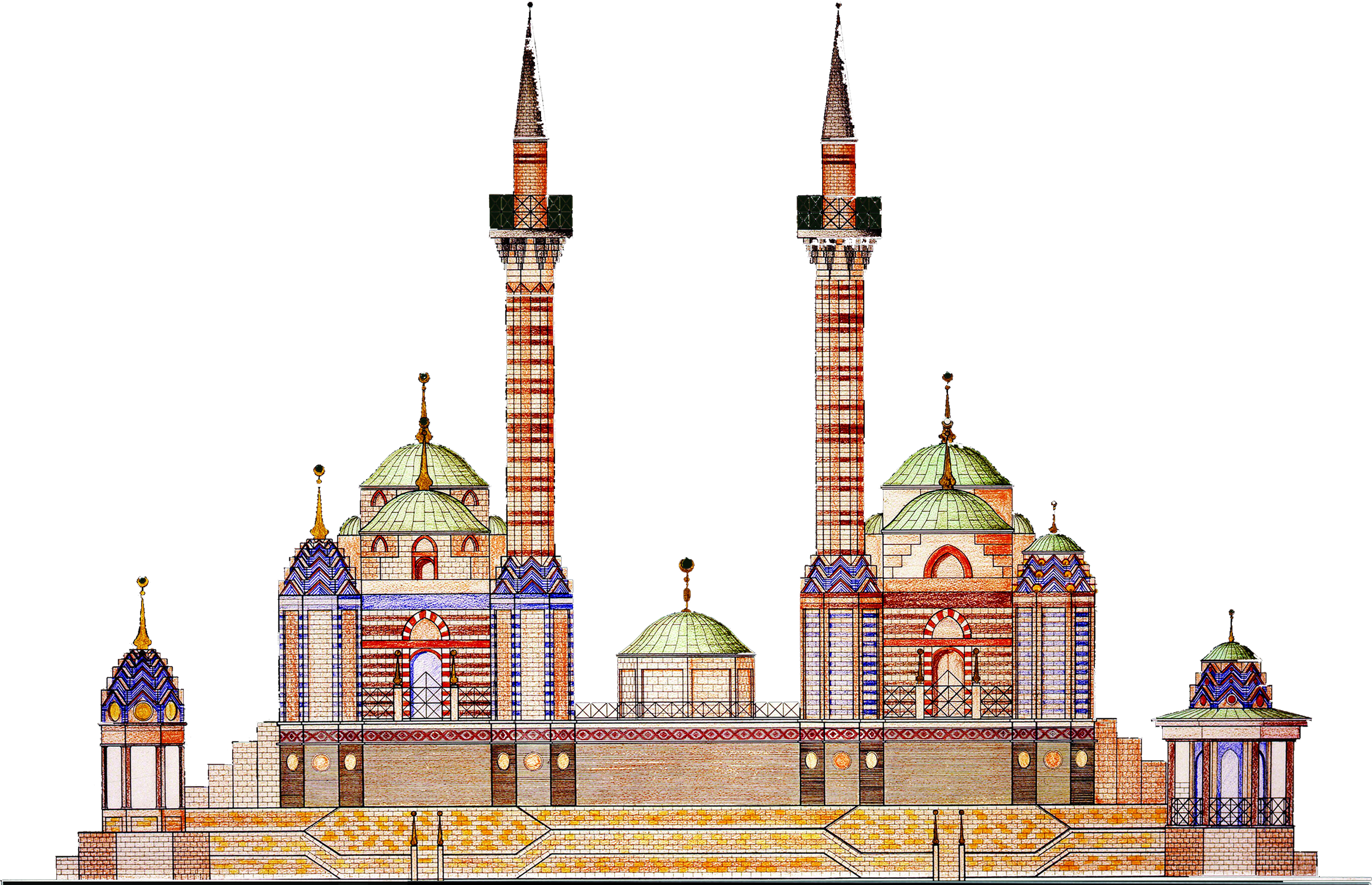
Gul Baba Turbe Precinct, Budapest

"Dr. Bayati’s design presents a large complex which successfully combines the styles of Ottoman architecture (as it was practised in Eastern Europe) and Hungarian architecture in the style of Lechner. The platform on which this complex is envisaged is already standing. The new buildings flank the turbe to the right and left. The building to the left, or more precisely to the south of the turbe, is a mosque. This is covered by three domes, all resting on drums of various heights, that in the centre being taller than the lateral ones. Due to the cold climate of the country the mosque is entirely covered and is rectangular in shape. Since colour is very much in evidence both on the exterior and interior of the building, it is envisaged that the mihrab will be coated with Zsolnay tiles and framed by a rectangular border containing Quranic inscription."

=== Ad-Dariyya Cultural Centre, Department of Antiquities & Museums, Saudi Arabia ===
"Inspired by the ruins of ad-Dariyya (Diriyah) the architect Basil Al-Bayati in his design for the new cultural centre incorporated some of the ancient architectural features. There are the mud-faced walls with square and circular buttresses invoking the old fortifications as well as ornamental triangular perforations arranged in rows in imitation of those on the walls of the ancient buildings; doorways, too, have recessed upper portions in the traditional manner. In this way the style of the new building reinforces the connection with the ruins of the old capital."

== Other works ==
=== Furniture ===
After finishing his studies and whilst running his first practice, he became interested in furniture design. Many of these early designs were created especially for architectural projects that he was working on. They were made from carved wood, made with the assistance of the classically trained carpenter, Faruq al-Najjar and displayed Assyrian and Sumerian motifs together with muqarnas (a mixture of pendentive and squinch). i.e. the offices of the President of the University of Basra.

Later, in the early 80s, Al Bayati continued his experiments with furniture design, mixing floral wood-carving with geometric inlay and turned work. Much of this work was made in Cairo and India and was once again designed specifically for houses that had been built by him in the Middle East. Some of these pieces are now on display in his centre in Málaga.

In the mid-80s Al Bayati's furniture design took a bold turn – influenced perhaps by the wave of post-modern architects and designers of the time. His designs attracted the attention of a number of flamboyant clients who commissioned suites for their weddings. His furniture of this period was all made at the exclusive OAK factory in Cantu, Italy, owned by the Pologna family with whom Al Bayati became close friends. His work, at this time, was considered by some to be post-modern although to others it readily escaped such definitions. Michael Collins in his Post-Modern Design said of it: "Pluralistic Post-Modernism is evident in the exotic furniture designed by Basil-Al Bayati…….inspired by Persian tomb-towers, Cairo Mosques, minarets, and the balconies of Moghul palaces, to name but a few sources. His is fantasy furniture, inflected towards Islamic colour and luxury."

In 2000 Al Bayati opened ‘Basil Leaf’, the first of a series of organic food shops in London in which all of the specialty gourmet food furniture and displays had been designed by him. The design of these pieces was extravagant and theatrical, using Sumerian mythological figures, chariots, temples, elephants and even Saint Basil's Cathedral as sources of inspiration. At the same time, the pieces were practical, functional creations – cake display cabinets, coffee grinders, fruit cabinets and so on. A number of these pieces can be seen at his centre in Málaga. In 2013, he was introduced by a mutual friend to Sidqa Usta, an expert craftsman from Istanbul. Together they began working on a new line of new furniture that was to include tables, display cabinets and wall units, in a uniquely Arabesque style utilising wood, marble and bronze as the principal materials. A number of these can now be seen in the centre in Málaga.

=== Metalwork ===
His frequent visits to Istanbul put him in touch with a number of local artisans, from sculptors, carvers, glass workers and metal workers. One of these was Yuksel Ustaoglu, an expert metal worker specialised in bronze and brass. Al Bayati began frequenting his workshop in the old Ottoman market and with Al Bayati's designs, they soon began producing a collection of chandeliers and lamps made from bronze and brass, five of which can now be seen in the cafeteria of his Málaga centre. The inspiration for this collection came this time from the natural world, in particular the geometric patterns and shapes of unusual sea creatures, blended with traditional old Ottoman-style lamps and lighting.

=== Glasswork and ceramic ===
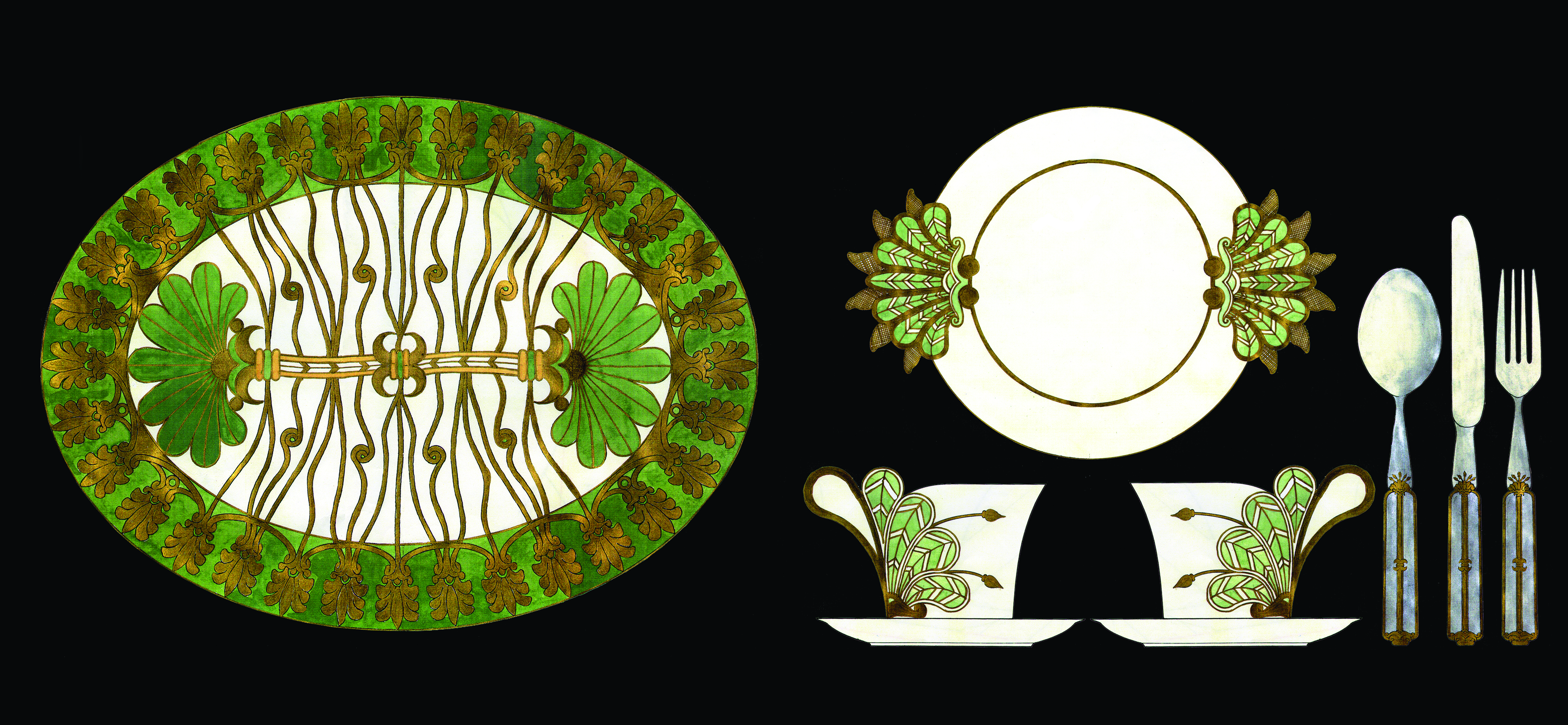
Palm Banqueting Suite

In 1990, he designed a collection of cutlery and tableware, called the Palm Banqueting Suite, based upon the motif of the palm tree. It was a one-off commission for one of his buildings for a client in Kuwait and was made by a local Italian artisan. A reproduction of this set, made in Morocco, is on display at the centre in Málaga.

In 1980 he designed a glass fountain for one of the Saudi royal family. The piece was so particular in its design that it took an expert glass-blower seven attempts before being successfully executed.

During the last few years he has continued his experiments, combining bronze and glass to create a series of bowls and sculptures that can be seen in the centre in Málaga.

=== Stonework ===
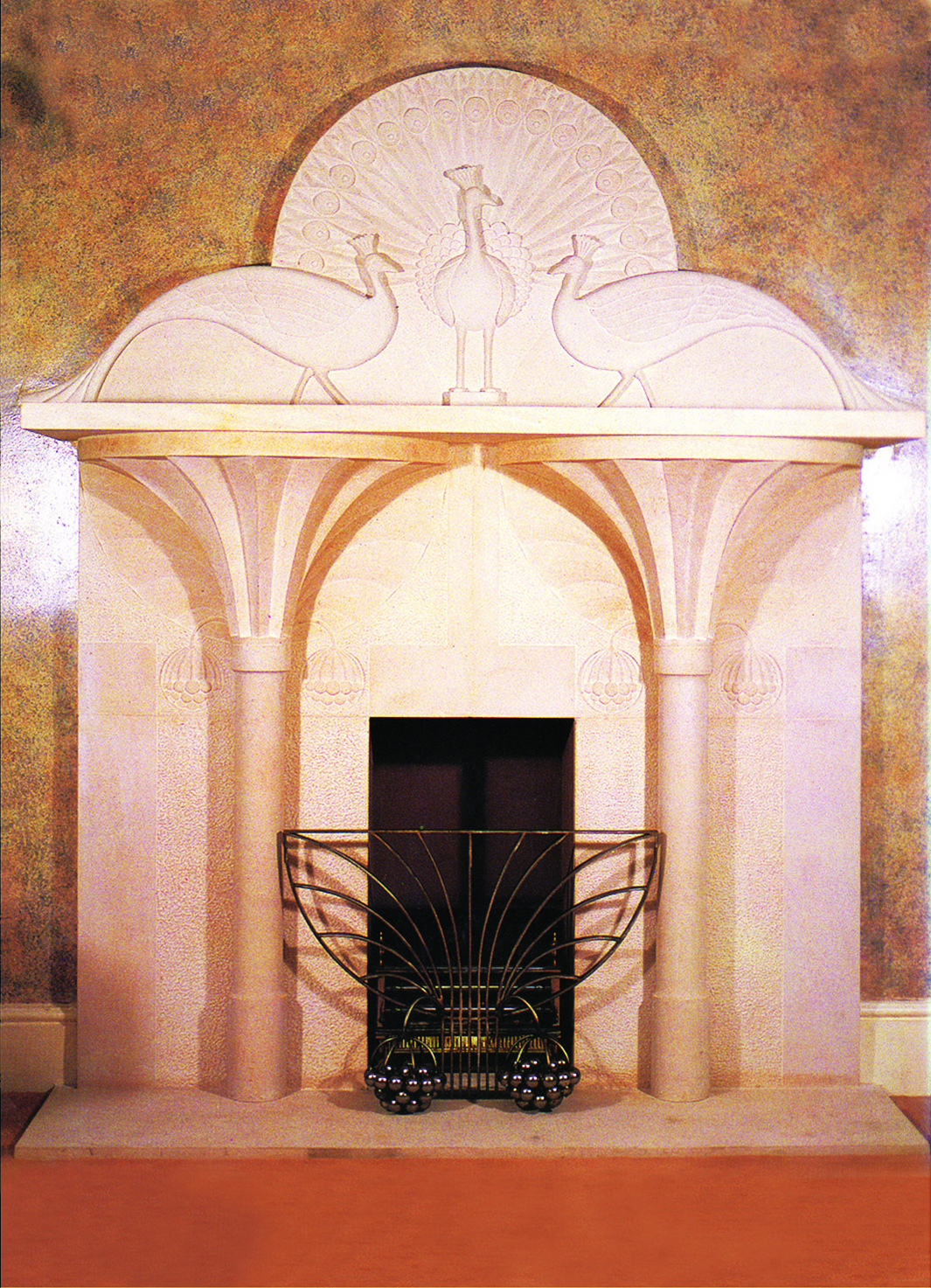
Palm Suite Fireplace

Al Bayati has also designed a number of features in stone usually as part of a larger architectural design. Two of the most notable are the waterfall feature of Westbourne Terrace (see list of works) and the Palm Suite fireplace, with its delicate peacock motif.

=== Writing ===
Apart from writing books on architecture, Dr. Bayati has also published works of fiction and autobiography and has contributed articles to publications such as Building Design, Alam Al-Benaa magazine and others. See below for a comprehensive list of books:

=== Books by Basil Al Bayati ===
- Al Bayati, Basil (1981). Process and Pattern. aarp. ISBN 0-906468-07-8.
- Al Bayati, Basil (1983). Community and Unity. Academy Editions/St. Martin's Press. ISBN 0-906468-07-8.
- Al Bayati, Basil (1984). The City and the Mosque. Oxford. ISBN 0-906468-08-6.
- Al Bayati, Basil (1988). Basil Al-Bayati: Architect. Academy Editions/St. Martin's Press. ISBN 0-85670-925-5.
- Al Bayati, Basil (1993). Basil Al Bayati: Recent Works. Academy Editions/Ernst & Sohn. ISBN 1-85490-170-2.
- Al Bayati, Basil (2008). Basil Al-Bayati: Conceptualist. Genivs Loci. ISBN 978-88-903666-2-8.
- Al Bayati, Basil (2011). The Age of Metaphors. Fabulist. ISBN 978-0-9571235-0-2.
- Al Bayati, Basil (2012). Baghdad: Memories of an Architect. Fabulist. ISBN 978-0-9571235-1-9.
- Al Bayati, Basil (2014). In Days of Old. Fabulist. ISBN 978-0-9571235-3-3.
- Al Bayati, Basil (2015). Creativity in Architectural Design. Fabulist. ISBN 978-0-9571235-5-7.
- Al Bayati, Basil (2015). The Sun, The Moon, The Architecture of Time. Fabulist. ISBN 978-0-9571235-4-0.

=== Other books ===
- Bingham, Neil. 100 Years of Architectural Drawing: 1900-2000. London: Laurence King, 2012. ISBN 978-1-78067-272-4
- Collins, Michael. Papadakis, Andreas. Post-Modern Design. London: Academy Editions, 1989. ISBN 978-0-84781-136-6
- Reynolds, Dwight (ed.). The Cambridge Companion to Modern Arab Culture. London: Cambridge University Press, 2015. ISBN 978-0-52172-533-0
- Kultermann, Udo. Architecture in the 20th Century. Van Nostrand Reinhold, New York, 1993. ISBN 978-0-44200-942-7
- Hattstein, Markus & Delius, Peter. Islam: Arte y Arquitectura. H.F. Ullmann, Berlin, 2007. ISBN 978-3-83313-536-1

=== Other information of interest ===
- Participated in the ‘Symposium on the Arab City: Its Character and Islamic Cultural Heritage’, 1981, held in Medina.
- Served on the editorial board for the Alam Al-Benaa magazine, published by the Centre of Planning and Architectural Studies.
- Served on the jury for the Arab Towns Organisation (ATO) Architectural award, Doha, Qatar.
- Book reviewer for Building Design magazine and Alam Al-Benaa magazine.
- Participated in the Arab Architecture Exhibition – Past and Present, organised by the Arab British Chamber of Commerce at the Royal Institute of British Architects, 1984.
- Participated in the Venice Biennale of Architecture Exhibition in 1982, directed by Paolo Portoghesi exhibiting ‘Jama’a Al-Kitab’ - The Book Mosque, Al-Nakhlah Palm Telecommunications Tower and others.

== List of works ==
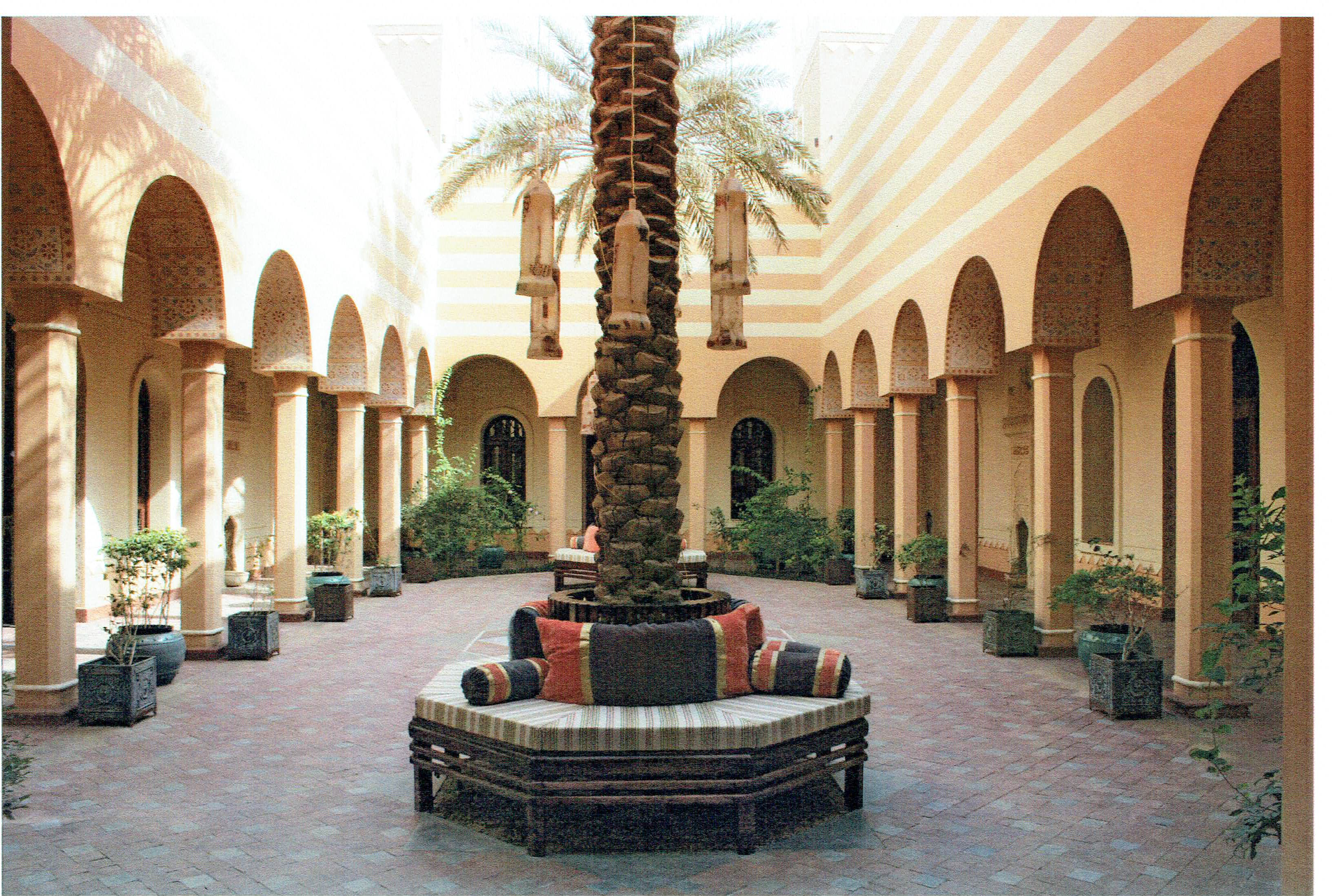
Seaside Chalet, Kuwait

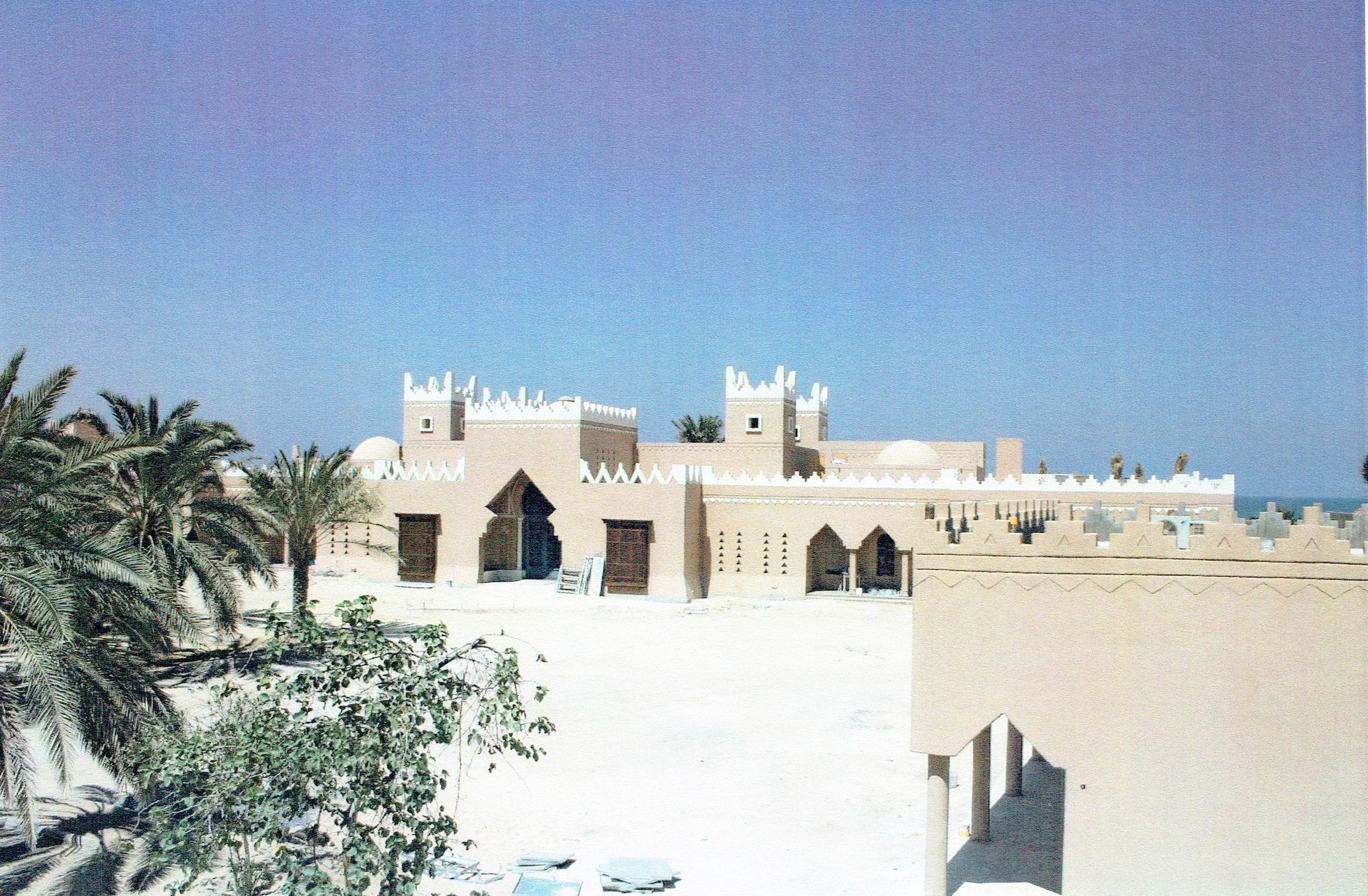
Seaside Chalet in Kuwait

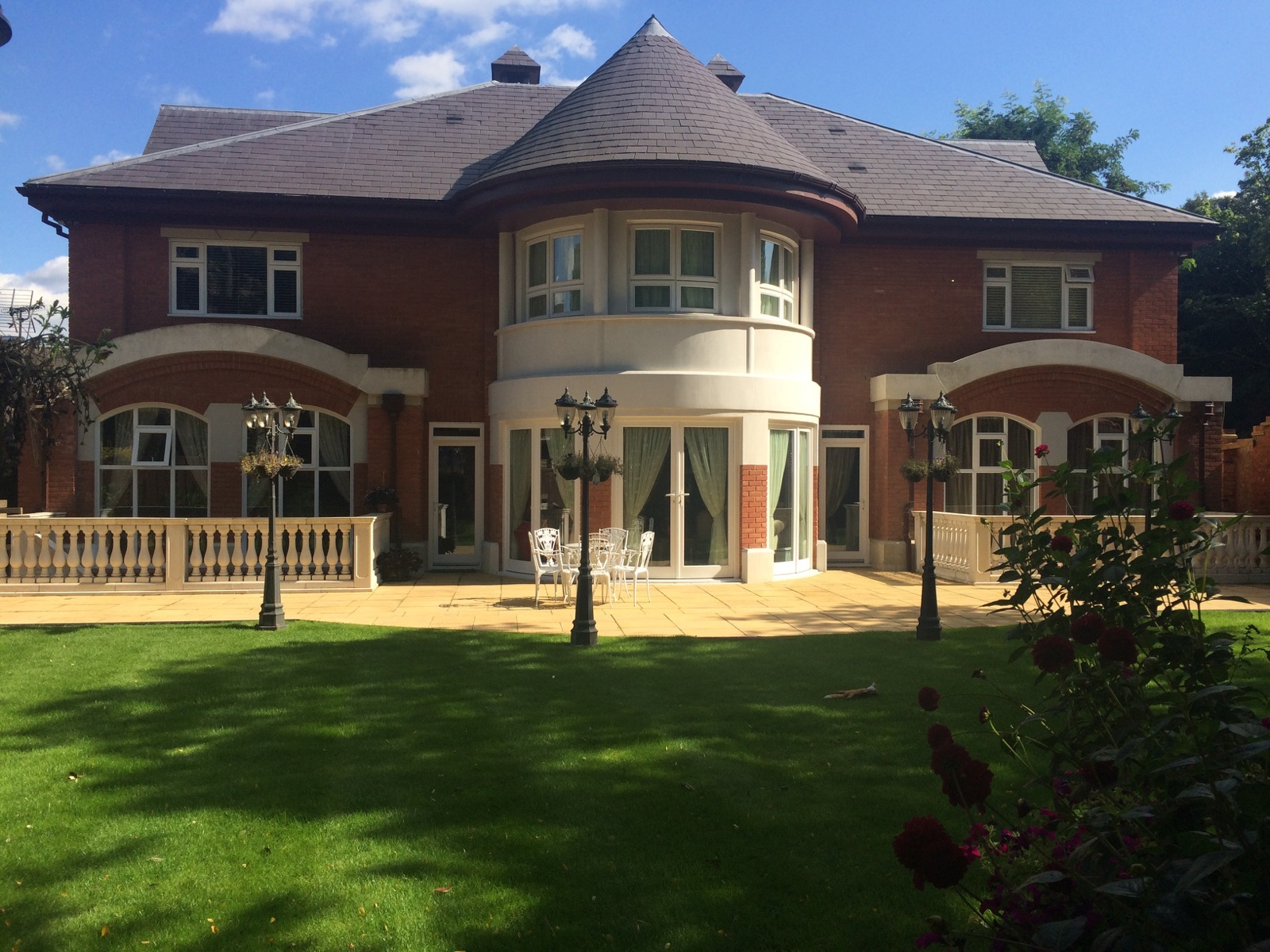
Wimbledon House

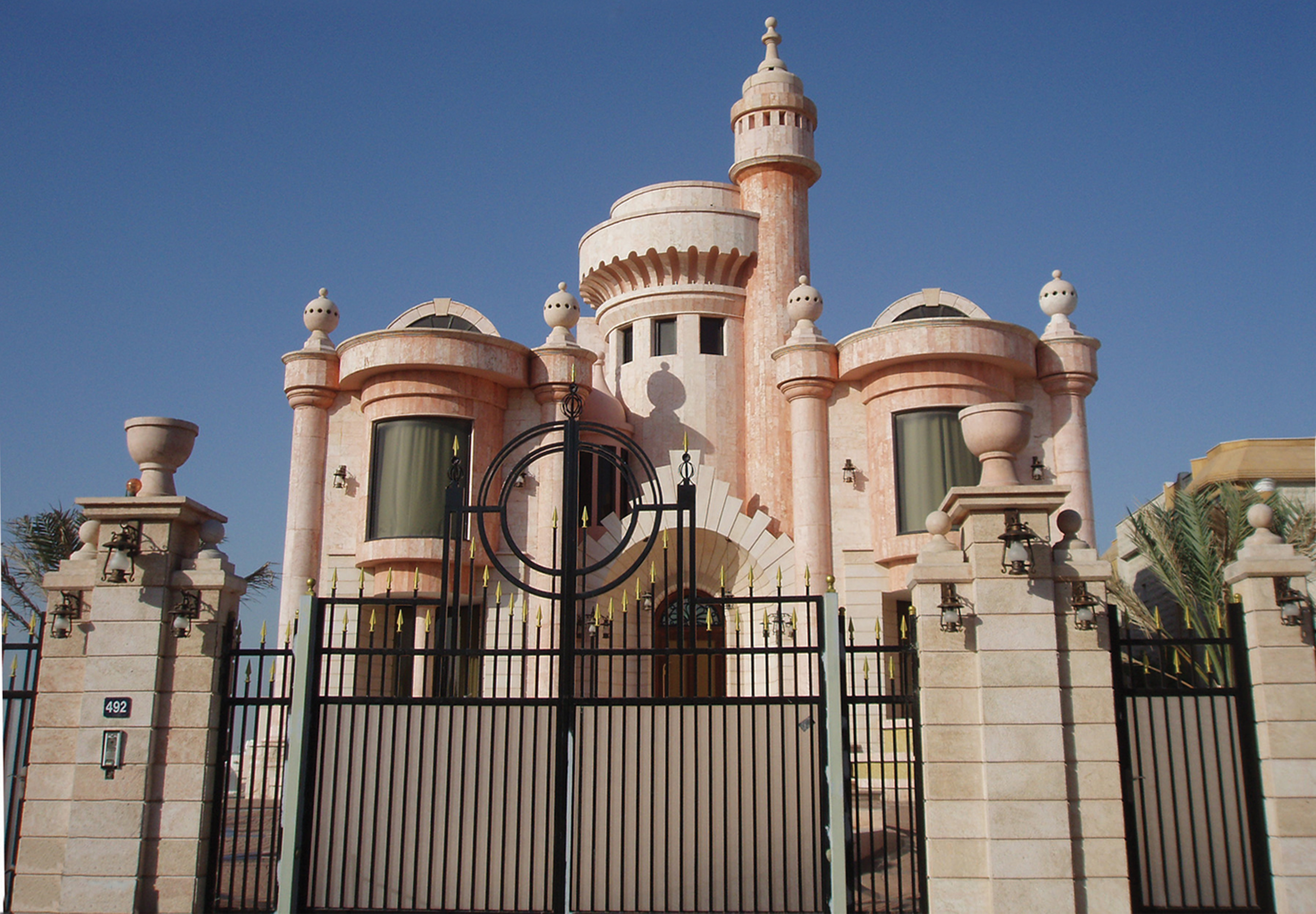
Jewel of Sharja

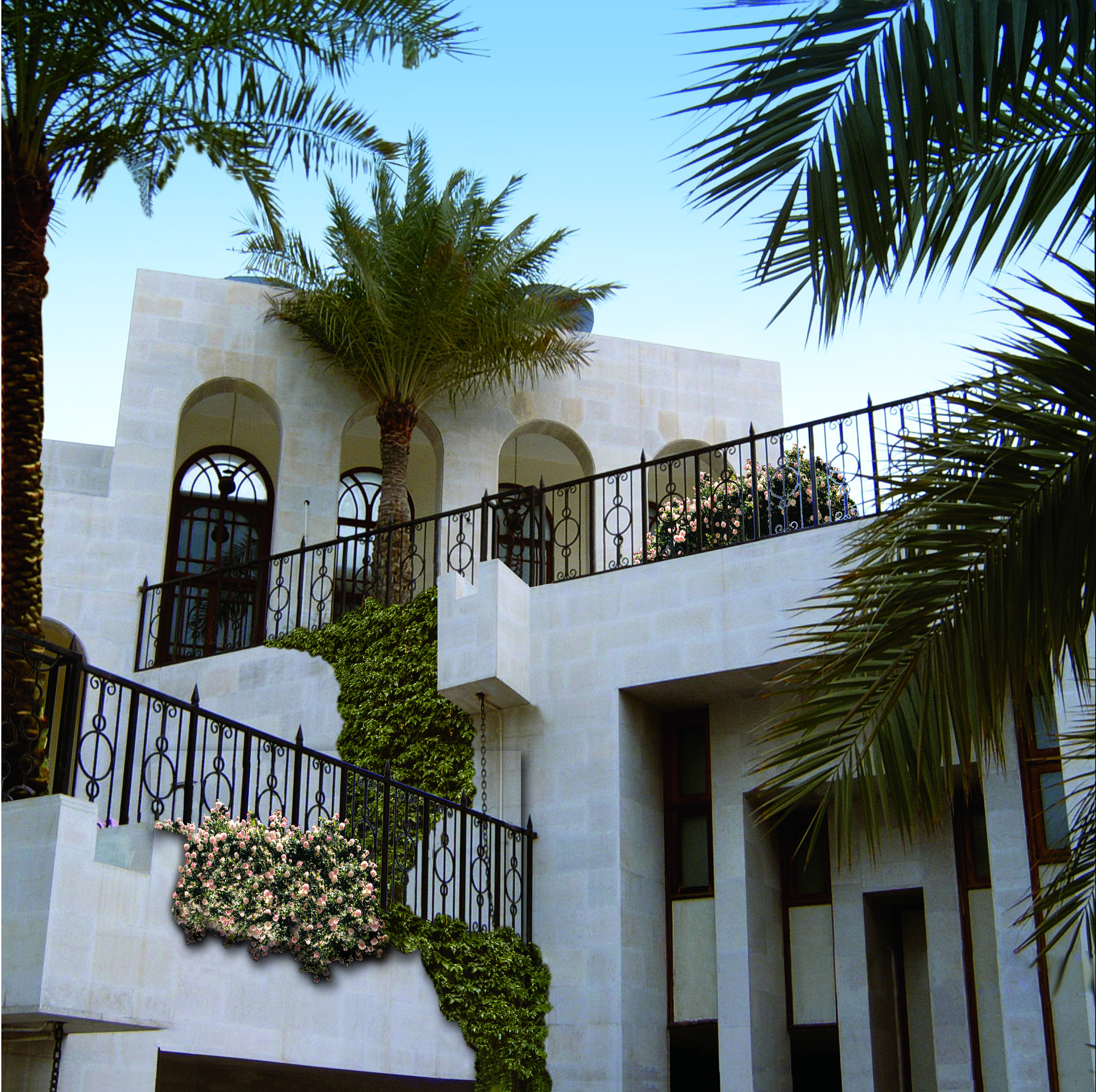
Hanging Garden Villa, Kuwait

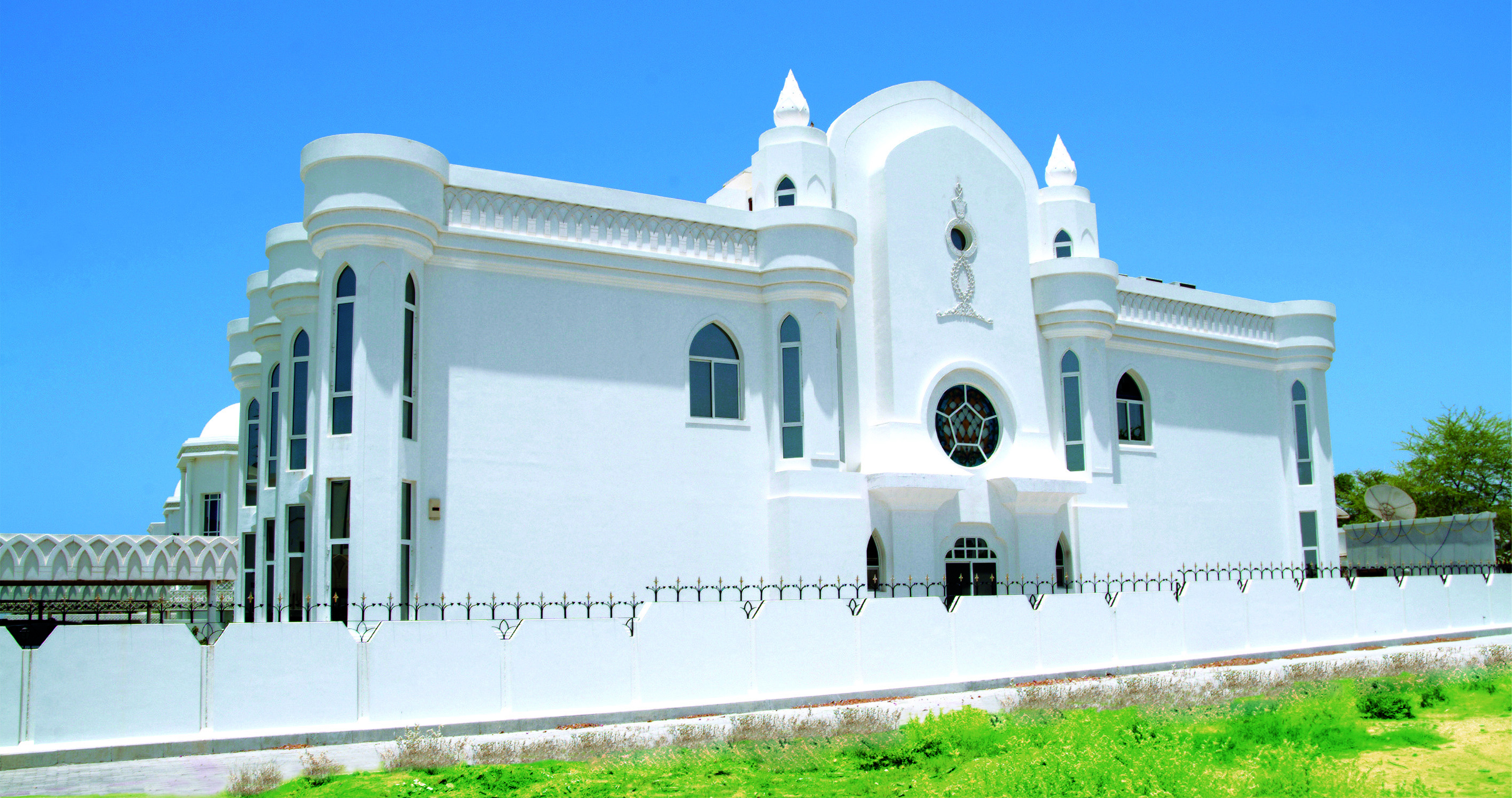
Oman Villa

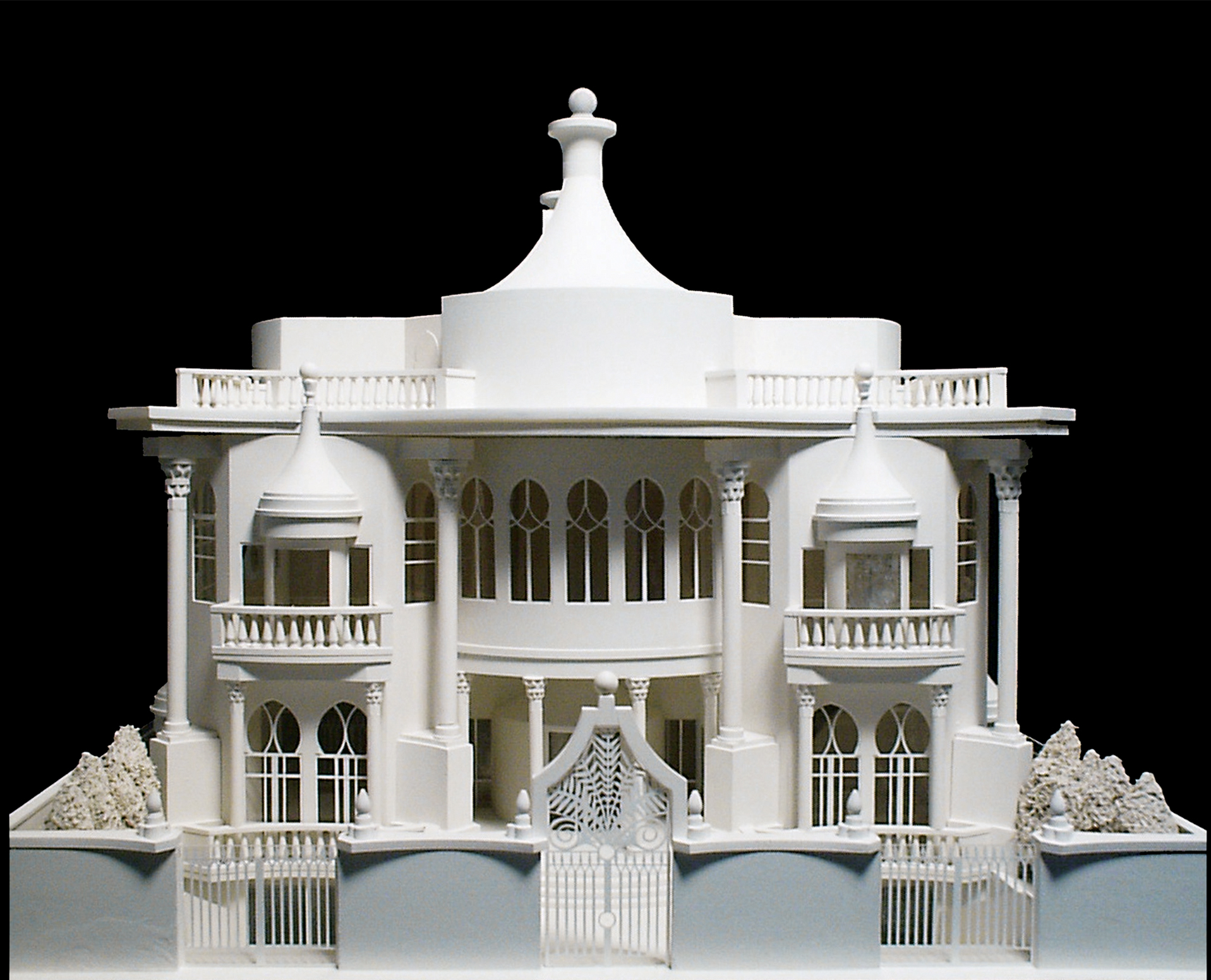
Arab Nouveau Villa, Kuwait

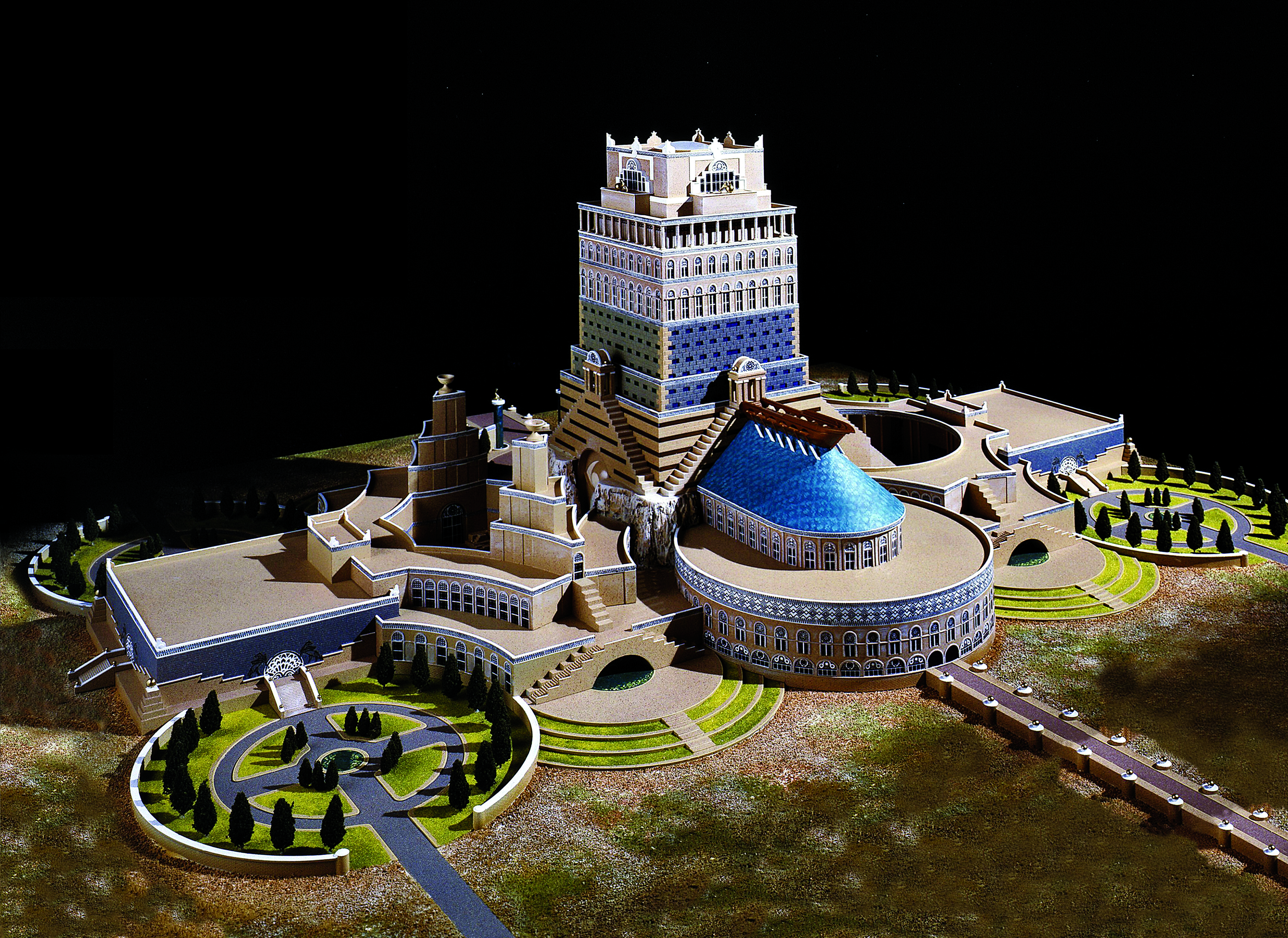
Qasir Ghumdan Hotel, Yemen

(Non-exhaustive)

Site	Location	Year
Istath Wadiya, Private Residence	Basra	1969
Skeleton, Stadium		1974
The Dhow, Hotel		1977
Al-Mabkharah, Water Tower		1979
Hanging Gardens, Courtyard Villa	Kuwait	1979
Ashburn Place	London	1982
Ukhaider, Government Complex		1982
Residential & Commercial Centre	Abu Dhabi	1982
Westbourne Terrace	London	1983
The Hamman, Turkish Baths, Spa & Sports' Centre		1983
Movotel, Hotel		1983
Crystal Towers	London	1983
Crystal House	London	1983
Government House	Saudi Arabia	1983
Camel Train, Monument		1984
Cylinders, Office & Commercial Centre		1984
Seagull, Senior Citizens' Home		1984
Dream World, Magic Island & Fantasy Palace		1984
Palm Mosque, King Saud University	Riyadh	1984
The Old Mill	London	1984
Maaber 1 & 2, Pedestrian Bridge		1985
St. Barbara House, Office Building		1985
Pleasure, Pavilion		1985
Time, Garden Lodge		1985
Bliss Tweed Mill	Chipping Norton	1986
Lisson Grove Development	London	1986
Hammersmith Road	London	1986
St. Barbara's House	London	1986
Vihara, Commercial Town Centre		1986
Orient Tower	United States	1986
Tristar Office Building		1986
Pavilion, House Art Gallery		1986
Blue Bird, Office Building		1987
Southall Town Centre	London	1987
Boadicea, Residential Apartments		1987
Scottish Castle, Bank		1987
Denmark Hill	London	1987
Ship, Residential Building		1987
Church Island House	London	1987
Diana House, Office & Commercial Centre		1987
Office Building	Riyadh	1987
Oculus, Private Office		1987
Gul Baba Turbe	Budapest	1987
Edinburgh Central Mosque	Edinburgh	1987
Mosque & Community Centre	Walsall	1988
Golden Hillock Road	Birmingham	1988
Courtyard House	Milton Keynes	1988
Morning Flower Residence	Dubai	1988
The Old Boat House	Church Island	1988
House in Riyadh	Riyadh	1988
Lord's View II, Penthouse & Duplexes	London	1989
Mova-Book, Library		1989
Bibliotheca Alexandria	Egypt	1989
Palace of Unity, Government House		1989
Sana'a, Shopping Centre		1989
Commercial & Residential Building	Yemen	1989
Medina Qaboos School	Oman	1990
Hyde Park Gate Mews	London	1990
T.V Studios, Video Library & Administration Building	Abu Dhabi	1990
Budapest, Trade Centre		1990
Qasir Ghumdan, Hotel & Conference Centre	Yemen	1990
Polyheight Office Building		1990
Dakkah Project	Yemen	1990
Trade Centre	Budapest	1990
27-30 Nicolson Square	Edinburgh	1990
Sinmar Palaces, Residential Complex		1990
Bugsy, Kindergarten		1990
The Drive	Middlesex	1991
Anguila, Hotal, Spa & Health Centre		1991
Seaside Complex	Yemen	1991
St. Cross, Student Accommodation		1991
St. Cross Road, Student Accommodation	Oxford	1991
College for Islamic Studies	Oxford	1991
Fish Canning Factory	Yemen	1991
Suburban House	London	1992
Private Residence	Oman	1992
Shopping Complex	Oman	1992
French, Seaside Chalet		1992
Cedar Hotel	Lebanon	1992
Seaside Chalet	Kuwait	1992
Private Residence	Yemen	1992
Fortress, Residence		1993
Snail, Car Showroom		1994
Sinbad, Theme Park		1994
Branches, Industrial Village		1995
Awatif Sultan, Private Residence	Oman	1995
Arab Nouveau Villa	Kuwait	1999
Dancing Dervish, Hotel		2000
Ribs, Health Centre, Spa & Hotel		2000
Quadrangle, Private Residence		2003
Jewel of Sharja, Family Residence		2003
Sky Castle, Residential Complex		2004
Gulf Wonders, Offices & Apartments		2005
Amsterdam Height		2005
Flying Terraces, Shopping Centre		2005
Heart & Lung, Medical Centre		2005
Venezia Al-Khaleej, Commercial & Residential Seaside Complex		2005
Jawharat-Al-Khaleej, Jewellery & Craft Centre		2006
Burjabal, Government Building		2006
Burjisr, Mall, Hotel, Apartments & Offices		2006
Minaret, Hotel & Apartments		2006
Samarkand, Shops & Apartments		2005
Octagon, Private University		2005
Jama Al Kitab, Mosque & Library		2006
Green Oak, Private Residence		2006
Malwiya, Commercial Centre		2006
Indo-Chinese Villa		2007

== Awards ==
- 1982: King Saud University main Mosque Competition first prize.
- 1982: Abu Dhabi City Competition UAE third prize.
- 1989: Awarded an honourable mention by the international jury of ‘Las Terrenas’, competition for architecture, in the city of New York.
- 1990: First prize in a competition held by the MECO Sana’a Yemen (hotel and conference centre).

== See also ==
- Iraqi art
- List of Iraqi artists
