= Future Minerals Forum =

Future Minerals Forum, Saudi Arabia

- Formation: 31 August 2021; 4 years ago
- Founder: Ministry of industry and mineral resources
- Type: Forum
- Purpose: To provide a platform the world’s minerals industry
- Headquarters: Riyadh, Saudi Arabia
- Region served: Worldwide
- Website: Official Website

The Future Minerals Forum is an international annual forum focused on the minerals and mining industry based in Riyadh, Saudi Arabia. It was founded on 21 October 2021 by the Saudi ministry of industry and mineral resources.

== History ==
The first summit was held from 11 to 13 January 2022 in the King Abdulaziz Conference Center in Riyadh, Saudi Arabia.

The 3rd summit took place from 9 to 11 January 2024. During its first day, the forum witnessed the signing of deals worth $7.2 billion. In the summit, Saudi Arabia's 2016 estimates of the $1.3 trillion of untapped minerals reserves in Saudi Arabia has seen a jump by around 90% to $2.5 trillion. In addition, Bandar Al-Khorayef, the Saudi minister of industry in mineral resources announced a $182 million in exploration incentives and the issuing of 33 mining licenses.
