= Ministry of Industry and Mineral Resources =

Government ministry of Saudi Arabia

- وزارة الصناعة والثروة المعدنية

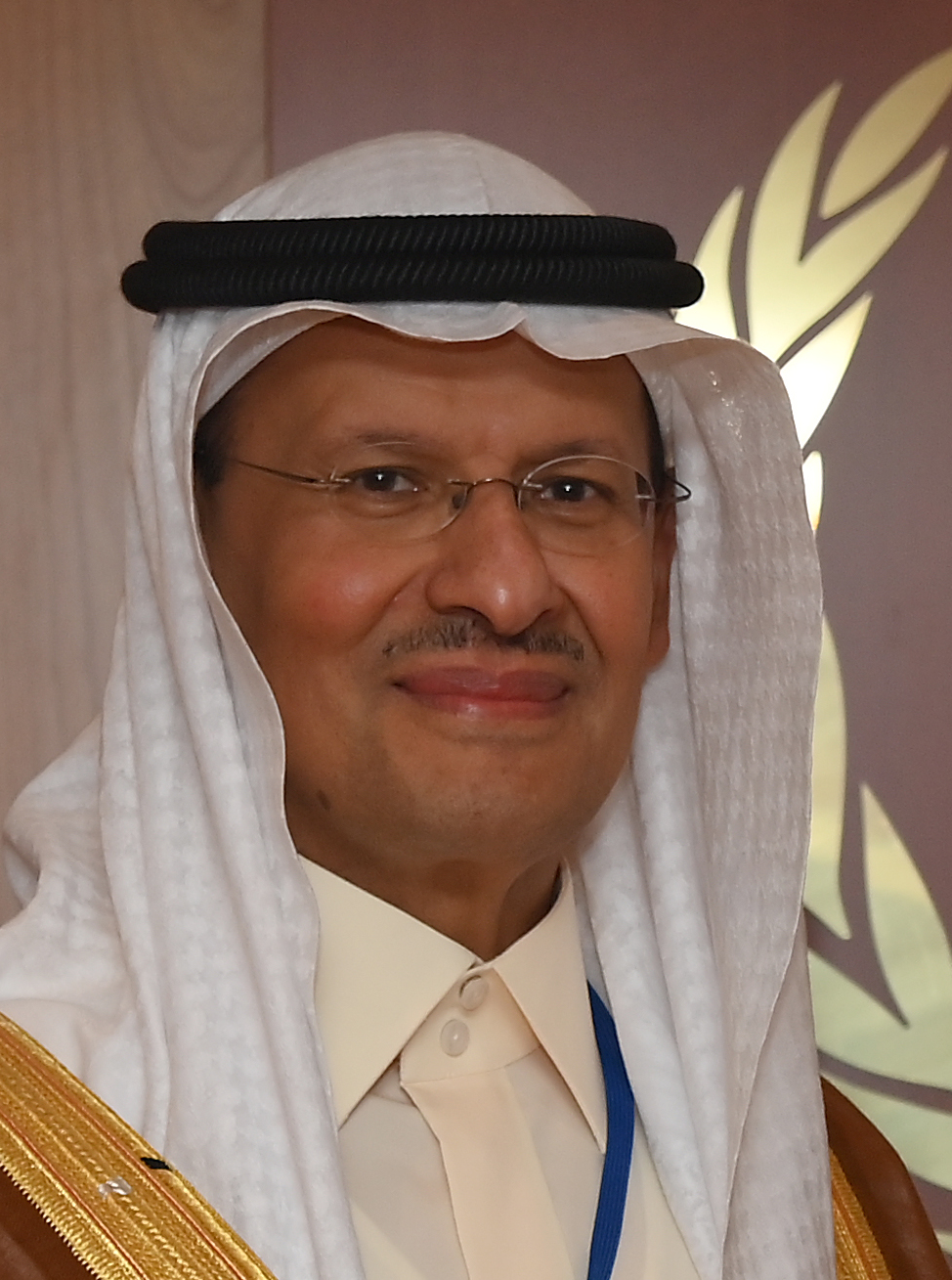
- Abdulaziz bin Salman, the current minister since 11 July 2026.

Agency overview
- Formed: 30 August 2019; 6 years ago
- Jurisdiction: Government of Saudi Arabia
- Headquarters: Riyadh
- Minister responsible: Abdulaziz bin Salman
- Child agencies: Saudi Export Development Authority; Saudi Geological Survey; Saudi Authority for Industrial Cities and Technology Zones
- Website: mim.gov.sa/en/

The Ministry of Industry and Mineral Resources (Note: Arabic: وزارة الصناعة والثروة المعدنية) is a government ministry in Saudi Arabia responsible for developing the industrial sector, managing the Kingdom’s mineral resources, and promoting sustainable economic growth.

== History ==
The Ministry of Industry and Mineral Resources was established on 30 August 2019, following the division of the Ministry of Energy, Industry and Mineral Resources into two separate entities: the Ministry of Energy and the Ministry of Industry and Mineral Resources, with Bandar Al-Khorayef appointed as its first minister.

The ministry was created to promote industrial development, manage the Kingdom’s mineral resources, and support economic diversification beyond oil.

In 2021, the ministry founded the Future Minerals Forum, Saudi Arabia's first-ever international event focused on the development of the mining and minerals sector.

On 11 July 2026, a royal order relieved Bandar Al-Khorayef of his duties as Minister of Industry and Mineral Resources and appointed him as a Minister of State. On the same day, Abdulaziz bin Salman was appointed Minister of Industry and Mineral Resources while retaining his position as Minister of Energy, making him concurrently responsible for both ministries.

== List of ministers ==
No.	Portrait	Minister	Took office	Left office	Time in office
1		Bandar bin Ibrahim	30 August 2019	11 July 2026	6 years, 315 days
2		Abdulaziz bin Salman	11 July 2026	Incumbent	1 day

== See also ==
- Future Minerals Forum
- Ministries of Saudi Arabia
