= Al Sadu =

Saudi traditional weaving skills

- Type: Weaving
- Material: Wool
- Production method: Weaving
- Production process: Handicraft
- Place of origin: Arabian Peninsula

Traditional weaving of Al Sadu
- UNESCO Intangible Cultural Heritage
- Country: Kuwait, Qatar, and Saudi Arabia
- Reference: 02158
- Region: Arab States

Inscription history
- Inscription: 2020 (15th session)
- List: Representative

Al Sadu, or simply Sadu, describes a specific technique of weaving in geometrical shapes hand-woven by Bedouin people. Sadu House in Kuwait was established by the Al Sadu Society in 1980 to preserve the interests of the Bedouins and Sadu weaving.

This traditional form of Bedouin weaving, is made on a ground loom which you can find in peoples homes. This is a way to be able to make homes called Bait al shaar which translates to house made from hair as in tents. It also makes camel accessories for carrying items and harnesses for Bedouins throughout their history. This was made for bedouin women specifically as they create new ideas and designs.

In 2011 Al Sadu traditional weaving skills in the United Arab Emirates was inscribed in the UNESCO List of Intangible Cultural Heritage in Need of Urgent Safeguarding (Item USL/00517), and transferred to the Representative List of the Intangible Cultural Heritage of Humanity in 2025. In 2020 traditional weaving of Al Sadu in Saudi Arabia and Kuwait was inscribed on the Representative List. In 2025 Qatar was included in this inscription.

== The nature of Al Sadu ==
Al Sadu weaving is said to be an ancient tribal craft that artistically portrays Arabian nomadic peoples’ rich cultural heritage and instinctive expression of natural beauty. Woven geometric and figurative patterns and symbols such as triangles and diamonds represents tribal identity as well as the elements of the desert and the weavers’ creative self-expression. These designs are seen as a way of storytelling cultural meaning and social identity. The textiles and weaving practice can be seen as an extension of the weaver's hand, and the graceful moving pace of the camel. Camels were used for transportation and food, but also for textile production, and so their figurative symbolism is important. Camel symbols and tribal animal brandings can create a complex visual code depicted in highly prized woven Sadu textiles. With the demise of tribal existence and the decline of associated weaving skills and memories, the demands for tribal camel textiles have virtually ceased, and so Al Sadu weaving and nomadic animal husbandry, once crucial and vital, is in decline.

== Al Sadu in Kuwait ==
There are two main settings for Al Sadu in Kuwait: the desert, the traditional home of the nomadic Bedouin, where weaving was carried out by women; and the settled, urban existence of the town, where a very different type of weaving was undertaken by men. The history of wool weaving in the Arabian desert goes back thousands of years with woven items such as the tent and its colorful dividers, storage bags and animal trappings. In the urban setting of the town, men took on the weaving of cloth for the bisht (a man's cloak).

The Al Sadu Society of Kuwait is dedicated to preserving, documenting and promoting the rich and diverse textile heritage of the Kuwaiti Bedouin, from the nomadic weaving of the desert through to the urban weaving of the town. Begun in 1978, as a private initiative, by a group of concerned Kuwaitis who wished to preserve a fast disappearing, yet intrinsic, cultural identity, the Al Sadu Project was founded. In 1991, soon after the Liberation of Kuwait, the project was transformed into Al Sadu Weaving Co-operative Society, a venture owned and run by the weavers and artisans themselves. The society runs a gallery, museum, shop and workshop at Sadu House (Beit al Sadu).

In 2020 at the Session of the UNESCO Intergovernmental Committee for the Safeguarding of the Intangible Cultural Heritage, Al Sadu was recognized as part of the Intangible Cultural Heritage of Humanity, following a request from Kuwait and Saudi Arabia.

== Al Sadu in the United Arab Emirates ==
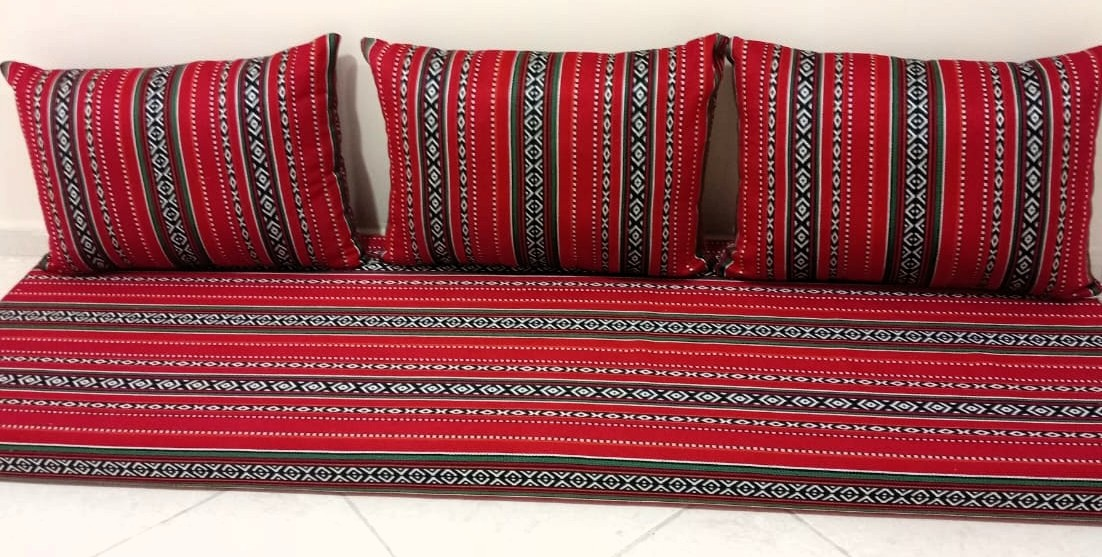
Majlis furniture in the UAE

Al Sadu in the United Arab Emirates is a traditional form of weaving practised by Bedouin women in rural communities. It is a practice that they use to fulfil the basic needs of their community. The raw materials used to make Al Sadu consists of camel fur, goat hair, and sheep wool. These furs and wool are sheared and cleaned to be prepared by the women. The yarn is spun on a drop spindle, then dyed using local plant extracts (such as henna or saffron), and then woven on a floor loom using a warp-faced plain weave. The traditional colours are black, white, brown, beige and red, with distinctive patterns in the form of narrow bands of geometric designs. The result is colourful products: clothing, camel and horse decorations, Bedouin tents, majlis floor pillows, carpets and mats. Traditionally, women gather in small groups to spin and weave, exchanging family news and occasionally chanting and reciting poetry. Such gatherings are also the means of transmitting the tradition: girls learn by watching, and are gradually given tasks to do, such as sorting the wool, before learning the more intricate skills involved.

In 2011 at the Sixth Session of the UNESCO Intergovernmental Committee for the Safeguarding of the Intangible Cultural Heritage, Al Sadu in the United Arab Emirates was inscribed on the List of Intangible Cultural Heritage in Need of Urgent Safeguarding.

Al Sadu weaving is not just a practice to create and design things. It is also used as a social gathering and a way to bring together communities and gather around and enjoy each others company. These gatherings make Al Sadu a symbolical and meaningful element that is placed in every household and moves to each generation as they learn new ways to pattern make and use it in majlis areas or living room areas where social gatherings take place.

== Al Sadu in Qatar ==
Like their neighbouring countries, Sadu weaving is a labour-intensive handicraft. This form ancient weaving practiced by bedouin women is important for survival as bait alshaar is what was used for sheltering and privacy within the Qatari desert. Traditionally, nomadic people obtained most of the raw materials from their flocks: fibres were made of sheep wool or camel or goat hair. They raised livestock close to where they live and removed their fur to wove sadu. The short fibres were combed and teased, before spinning them to create a continuous yarn. Women of all ages could often be found spinning throughout the day, as they carried out other daily activities, such as herding, or cooking. Al-Sadu weaving is distinguished by its technique, in which long and narrow strips of cloth, sometimes up to 7 metres, are woven individually on a horizontal ground loom. The bands are then sewn together to create a large canvas. It was common for these designs to reflect the desert environment. Symbols represented the stars, meteorological phenomena, or sand dunes, desert plants or animals. Weavers also depicted the jewellery and face decorations that women of the tribe wore to represent not only their beauty, but also the tribe’s wealth.

In 2021, Embrace Doha an independent cultural house located in Souq Al Wakrah curated two private galleries dedicated to telling the story of Sadu from the prospective of the last few local Sadu weavers left in the country. The aim of their work is to bring attention to the urgency of safeguarding the intangible heritage of Sadu weaving to ensure the continuity and preservation efforts for the wider community.

Al Sadu is an important part of the cultural heritage in Qatar as exhibitions keep it alive. For example, an Al Sadu center recently opened in Katara shows how people are promoting the craft through workshops and other educational programs (Qatar News Agency, 2022).

== Notable people ==
- Bibi Duaij Al-Jaber Al-Sabah
- Haifa al-Mogrin
- Aljoud Lootah
