= Tawfig AlRabiah =

Saudi Arabian politician

His Excellency Tawfig AlRabiah
- توفيق الربيعة
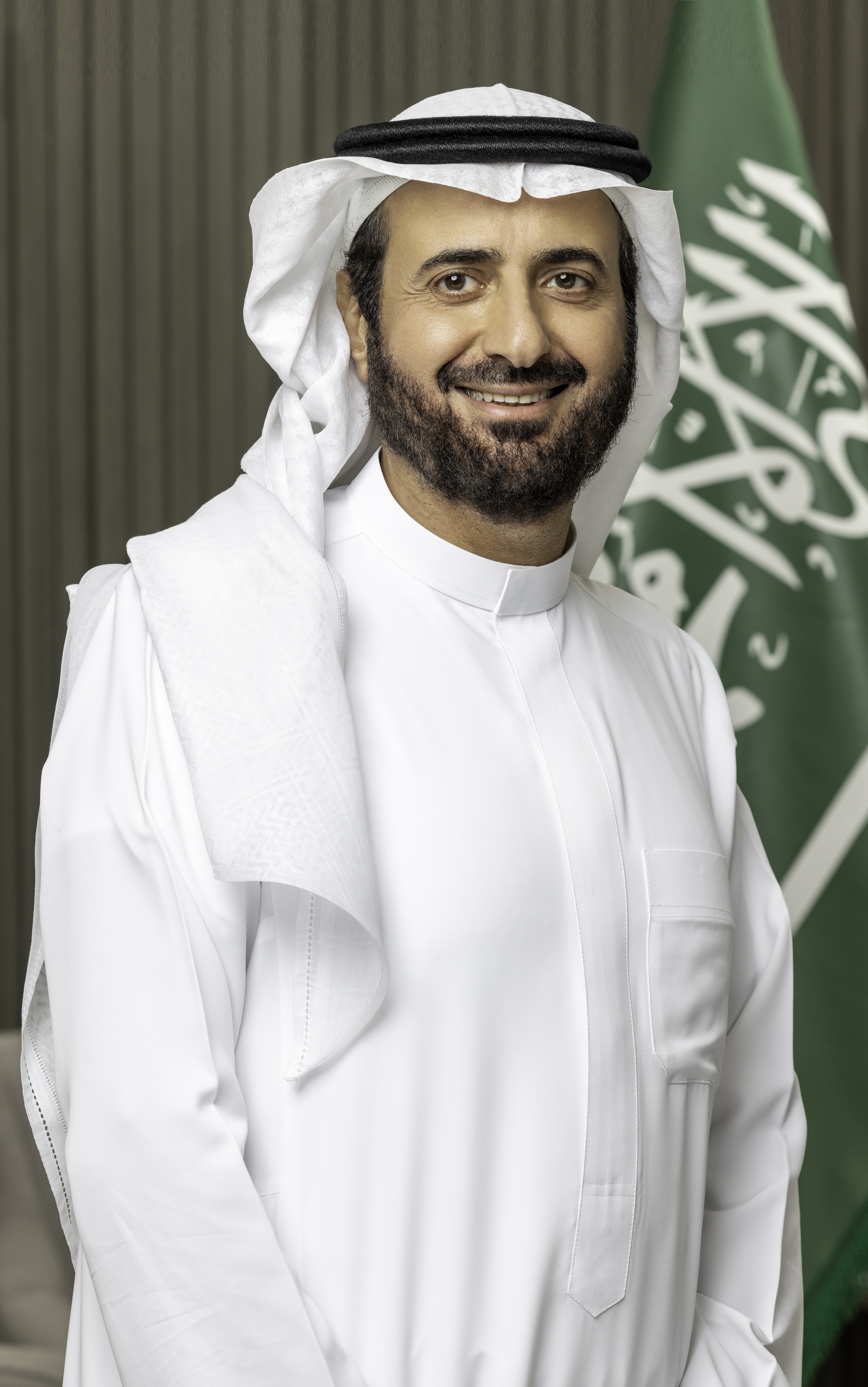
- Al Rabiah in 2022

Minister of Hajj and Umrah
- Incumbent
- Assumed office 15 October 2021
- Monarch: Salman
- Prime Minister: Salman (2021–2022); Mohammed bin Salman (2022–present)
- Preceded by: Dr. Issam bin Saad bin Saeed

Minister of Health
- In office 7 May 2016 – 15 October 2021
- Prime Minister: Salman
- Preceded by: Khalid A. Al-Falih
- Succeeded by: Fahad Al-Jalajel

Minister of Commerce and Industry
- In office 13 December 2011 – 6 May 2016
- Prime Minister: Abdullah of Saudi Arabia (2011–2015); Salman (2015–2016)
- Preceded by: Abdullah Zainel Alireza
- Succeeded by: Majid bin Abdullah Al Qasabi

Personal details
- Born: 26 October 1965 (age 61) Riyadh, Saudi Arabia
- Education: King Saud University; The University of Pittsburgh

Tawfig AlRabiah (Arabic: توفيق بن فوزان الربيعة; born 26 October 1965) is a Saudi politician and computer scientist who has served as the Minister of Hajj and Umrah since 2021. He served as Minister of Health from May 2016 until October 2021. He was the Minister of Commerce and Industry from December 2011 to May 2016.

Before his ministerial appointments, AlRabiah served as director general of the Saudi Authority for Industrial Cities and Technology Zones (MODON). Alongside this role, he was assigned to serve as deputy minister for industrial affairs at the Ministry of Commerce and Industry. He was also entrusted with the duties assigned to the Minister of Commerce and Investment under the regulations governing the Consumer Protection Association.

On 30 April 2022, the Royal Commission for Makkah City and Holy Sites announced that AlRabiah had been assigned to serve as its acting chief executive officer. On 8 August 2023, he was appointed chairman of the board of directors of the General Authority for the Care of the Affairs of the Grand Mosque and the Prophet’s Mosque.

== Early life and education ==
AlRabiah was born in Riyadh, Saudi Arabia, on 26 October 1965. In 1986, he graduated with a bachelor's degree from the College of Business at the King Saud University (KSU) His bachelor’s degree was in business administration, with a specialization in quantitative methods. He then worked as a teaching assistant at King Saud University for one year, until 1987. He studied at the University of Pittsburgh, where he attained master's degree in Information Science in 1990, a master's degree in computer science in 1995, and Ph.D. in Computer Science in 1999. He also received a teaching fellowship at the University of Pittsburgh in 1999.

He worked as an assistant professor at King Saud University between 1999 and 2002.He published approximately 16 peer-reviewed research papers and contributed to the development of Saudi Arabia’s national information technology plan by participating in the preparation of its IT vision document.

== Political career ==
Before his ministerial appointments, AlRabiah served as director general of the Information and Communications Technology sector at the Saudi Arabian General Investment Authority (SAGIA). In April 2007, he was appointed director general of the Saudi Authority for Industrial Cities and Technology Zones (MODON), serving until December 2011. The Saudi Arabian General Investment Authority (SAGIA) was established in 2000. In 2002, AlRabiah took up a leadership position as director general of its information and communications technology sector. His work included investment projects aimed at improving administrative processes in the sector and opening the Saudi market to multinational companies.

He also participated in SAGIA’s “10 × 10” programme, which aimed to position Saudi Arabia among the world’s top ten countries in terms of its investment environment. During this period, Saudi Arabia’s position in the World Bank’s Doing Business rankings rose from 67th in 2005 to 16th in 2009.

At MODON, AlRabiah worked on expanding industrial cities and attracting new companies to invest in Saudi Arabia. His responsibilities included improving services and the business environment within industrial cities, supporting small and medium-sized enterprises, and developing industrial initiatives.

MODON’s expansion strategy was described as achieving a sixfold increase in development, exceeding the expansion recorded over the preceding four decades. Growth was reported across several sectors, with manufacturing-sector growth exceeding 50 per cent in 2011.

Other initiatives included the development of MODON Lake Park near Dammam. The project formed part of a broader strategy to improve the industrial city’s environment, transforming an area affected by wastewater and waste into green space and recreational facilities.

During his tenure, MODON was recognised for its performance as a government organisation for four consecutive years. AlRabiah subsequently became Minister of Commerce and Industry in December 2011.

=== Minister of Commerce and Industry (2011–2016) ===
On 13 December 2011, AlRabiah was appointed Minister of Commerce and Industry. He held the post until May 2016, when he was appointed Minister of Health. As a member of the Council of Ministers, AlRabiah worked on planning and implementing Saudi Arabia’s national industrial strategy. His work included regulatory reforms intended to address gaps in commercial legislation and facilitate business operations, as part of broader efforts to diversify the economy and reduce its dependence on oil.

These reforms addressed competition, intellectual property rights and consumer protection. New provisions were introduced to promote fair competition and strengthen confidence in products and services in the Saudi market.

Between 2011 and 2015, he also served on several government bodies, including the Supreme Council for Petroleum and Minerals, the board of directors of the Public Investment Fund, and the General Committee of the Council of Ministers.

=== Business regulatory reforms ===
During AlRabiah tenure, the ministry introduced changes to business regulations as part of efforts to align Saudi commercial practices with World Trade Organization standards. These included measures supporting the adoption of International Financial Reporting Standards (IFRS) to improve transparency in corporate financial reporting. AlRabiah and other government bodies also worked to explain the new requirements to businesses.

Changes to intellectual property procedures included updates to registration processes and measures to strengthen patent protection and address infringements. Trademark application procedures were also revised. By 2015, AlRabiah had introduced electronic processes intended to reduce the time required to review and decide trademark applications. Within two years, most trademark applications were being submitted online.

Similar electronic services were introduced to simplify procedures for sole proprietorships. Other changes included electronic submission of industrial licence applications and financial statements.

AlRabiah identified undisclosed charges as a challenge facing consumers. Measures introduced during this period addressed service charges and commercial pricing, particularly in restaurants. Other rules covered delivery, installation and product warranties.

A consumer contact centre was established to receive complaints, protect consumer rights and assist the public. Businesses were also required to display product prices to improve transparency and reduce disputes.

Under AlRabiah’s leadership, several new organisations were established under the ministry’s umbrella. In 2007, the Saudi Export Development Authority was established to develop the export market. Other business-related organisations were also established, including the Small and Medium Enterprises General Authority, Bayan Credit Bureau, and THIQAH, an information technology solutions company. AlRabiah also founded ASAS, a non-profit company established to maintain and manage industrial cities.

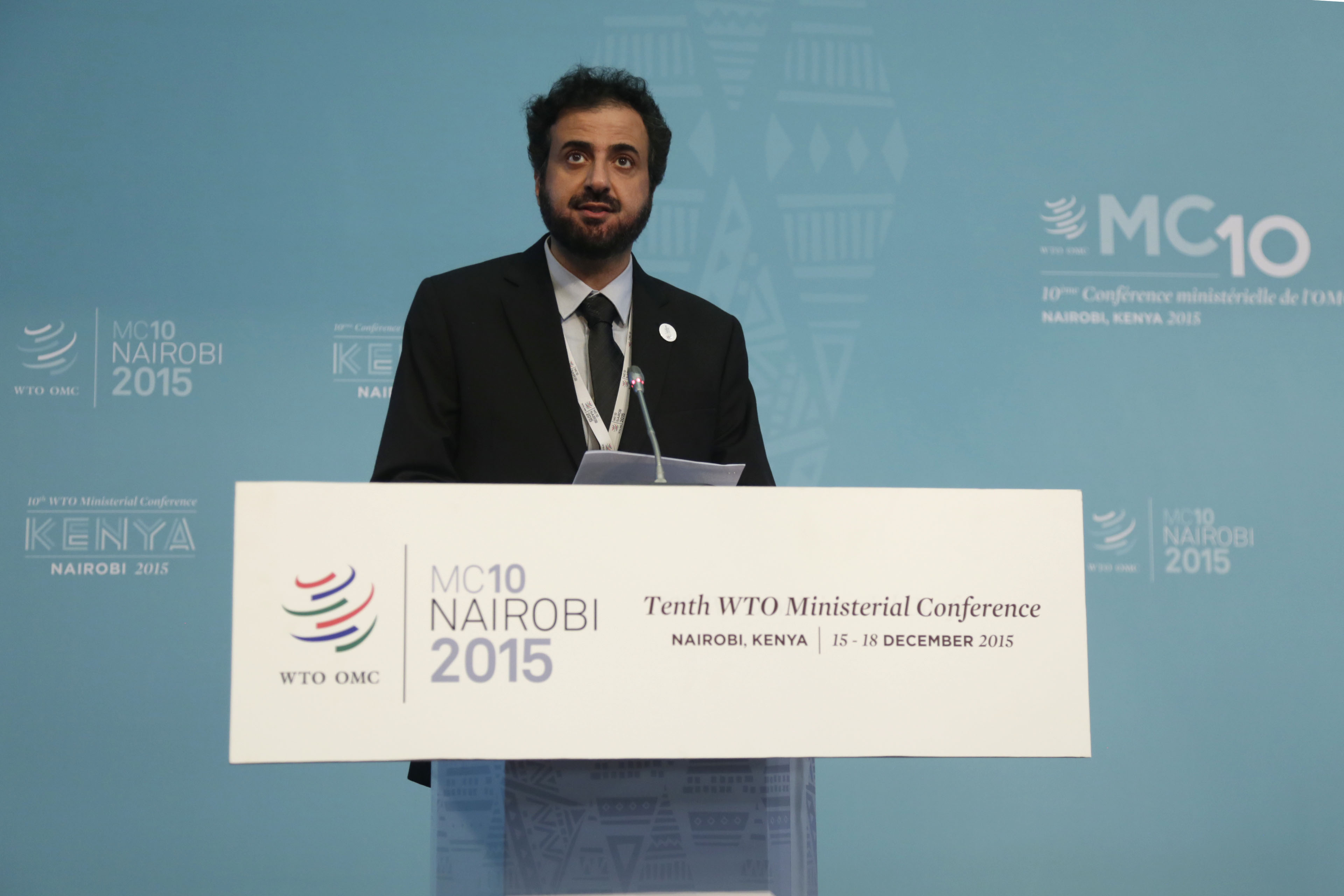
Speaking at the Tenth WTO Ministerial Conference in 2015

=== Minister of Health (2016–2021) ===
On 7 May 2016, a royal decree appointed AlRabiah as Minister of Health. He served until 15 October 2021, when he was appointed Minister of Hajj and Umrah. Before becoming Minister of Health, AlRabiah had been involved in strategic planning for government initiatives through his ministerial work from 2011. Following his appointment to the health portfolio in 2016, his responsibilities focused on healthcare reform within the framework of Saudi Vision 2030.

This included overseeing plans to restructure healthcare delivery and decentralise services through 20 regional healthcare clusters. The planned model envisaged each cluster providing healthcare services to approximately one million people.

In 2019, AlRabiah received the World Health Organization Director-General’s Special Recognition Award for tobacco control during the 72nd World Health Assembly.

Saudi Arabia had ratified the WHO Framework Convention on Tobacco Control in 2005. Its tobacco-control targets included reducing tobacco use from 12.7 per cent in 2017 to 5 per cent by 2030.

In March 2019, he also received the Sharjah Government Communication Award in the category recognising an influential social media personality serving the public good through awareness-raising.

=== Minister of Hajj and Umrah (2021–present) ===
On 15 October 2021, a royal order relieved AlRabiah of his position as Minister of Health and appointed him Minister of Hajj and Umrah. Fahad Al-Jalajel was appointed Minister of Health as his successor

== Positions and achievements ==
AlRabiah supported the development of high-speed communications networks and digital services in industrial cities, alongside improvements to public, commercial and government services. He also worked on developing the industrial affairs agency at the Ministry of Commerce.

He served as director general of ICT investment development at the Saudi Arabian General Investment Authority. He contributed to the National Information Technology Plan and served on the council of its General Secretariat. His academic and advisory roles included teaching at King Saud University and the University of Pittsburgh, membership of the Saudi Computer Society’s board, and advising government and private-sector organisations.

During his tenure as Minister of Health, he worked on 40 initiatives under Saudi Vision 2030 concerning digital services, healthcare restructuring, and a flexible financing model based on payment for services rather than budget allocations.

== Management of the COVID-19 pandemic in Saudi Arabia ==
In 2020, AlRabiah led Saudi Arabia’s response to the COVID-19 pandemic in his capacity as Minister of Health. The Ministry of Health implemented a plan that included providing healthcare services to all population groups and introducing preventive measures to limit transmission. These measures contributed to maintaining relatively low mortality rates.

The ministry organised a programme providing free COVID-19 vaccines through dedicated centres across the country. Vaccination coverage exceeded 90% among people aged 60 and over, while the vaccination rate among the target population reached 95.9%. A total of 58,812,295 vaccine doses were administered, and 38,791,981 tests were conducted. The ministry also provided specialised services through Tetamman clinics, which served more than five million people. The recovery rate among people infected with the virus was approximately 95.4%. These efforts were associated with increased satisfaction among users of healthcare services during the pandemic.

Under AlRabiah, the ministry worked with other authorities to limit transmission and strengthen health-system preparedness. Measures included free treatment and testing for all citizens and residents, including those without valid residency status. The ministry conducted field screening campaigns and established fixed and mobile testing centres, with appointments available through the Sehhaty application.

The ministry expanded hospital capacity by increasing the number of general, intensive care and isolation beds and establishing mobile field hospitals. It also strengthened health surveillance at points of entry and developed domestic laboratory capacity for early detection of the virus. Community prevention measures included the nationwide provision of free vaccines. Government measures also included additional funding for the health sector and international assistance to health organisations and countries affected by the pandemic.

== International Monetary Fund report ==
According to the International Monetary Fund’s 2021 Article IV consultation report, Saudi Arabia’s swift and decisive government response helped limit COVID-19 infections and deaths. The report noted that ongoing economic reforms under Saudi Vision 2030, coordination among government agencies, and the establishment of specialised high-level committees helped mitigate the pandemic’s economic impact.

During AlRabiah’s tenure as Minister of Health, health and preventive measures were organised and implemented, including public awareness campaigns, expanded testing and widespread vaccine provision, as part of efforts to limit the spread of the virus.

== Government boards, organisations and committees ==
- Chairman of the Board of Directors of the General Authority for the Care of the Affairs of the Grand Mosque and the Prophet’s Mosque, appointed on 8 August 2023.
- Chairman of the Pilgrim Experience Program Committee.
- Chairman of the Board of Directors of Kidana Development Company.
- Chairman of the Board of Directors of the Saudi Industrial Development Fund.
- Chairman of the Board of Directors of the Saudi Authority for Industrial Cities and Technology Zones (MODON).
- Chairman of the Board of Directors of the Saudi Standards, Metrology and Quality Organization.
- Chairman of the Board of Directors of the Saudi Export Development Authority.
- Chairman of the Board of Directors of the Competition Protection Council.
- Chairman of the Board of Directors of the National Industrial Clusters Development Program.
- Chairman of the Board of Directors of the Saudi Organization for Certified Public Accountants.
- Chairman of the Board of Directors of the Saudi Institute of Internal Auditors.
- Chairman of the Board of Directors of the Saudi Authority for Accredited Valuers.
- Member of the Industrial Development Board of the United Nations Industrial Development Organization (UNIDO).
- Board member of several companies.
- Director General of the Information and Communications Technology Sector at the Saudi Arabian General Investment Authority.
- Acting Chief Executive Officer of the Royal Commission for Makkah City and Holy Sites.
- Chairman of the Board of Directors of King Khaled Eye Specialist Hospital and Research Centre.

== Awards and honours ==
AlRabiah has received awards and honours in healthcare, innovation, and the development of Hajj and Umrah services, including:

- Social media personality serving the public good (20 March 2019): Presented at the Sharjah Government Communication Award ceremony in the United Arab Emirates in recognition of his use of social media to promote public awareness and serve the community.
- International tobacco-control award (22 May 2019): Received on behalf of Saudi Arabia during the 72nd World Health Assembly in Geneva, recognising the country’s efforts to combat tobacco use, encourage cessation, and raise awareness of its effects on individuals and society.
- State Appreciation Award from the United Arab Emirates (6 November 2019): Presented in recognition of his contributions to innovation and support for social and economic development in Saudi Arabia.
- International Maal Hijrah Personality Award from Malaysia (28 June 2025): Presented in recognition of his efforts to develop Hajj and Umrah services and Saudi Arabia’s role in improving the pilgrim experience.

== Publications ==
Book	Yaer	Description	Reference
الوقوف على أطراف الأصابع: ذكريات مع جائحة كورونا 2020	2023	Documents his experience during the COVID-19 pandemic and the challenges he faced while serving as Minister of Health.	الربيعة يقدم "الوقوف على أطراف الأصابع" في "كتاب الرياض" - جريدة المدينة

== Personal life ==
AlRabiah is married to Maha Muhammad Alsayari. They have five children.

Political offices
Preceded by Abdullah Zainel Alireza	Minister of Commerce and Industry; 2011–2016	Succeeded by Majid bin Abdullah Al Qasabi
Preceded by Khalid A. Al-Falih	Minister of Health; 2016–2021	Succeeded by Fahad Al-Jalajel
Preceded by Issam bin Saad bin Saeed	Minister of Hajj and Umra; 2021–present	Incumbent
