= Ministry of Health (Saudi Arabia) =

Government ministry of Saudi Arabia

Ministry of Health Kingdom of Saudi Arabia
- Logo, Ministry of Health of Saudi Arabia

Agency overview
- Formed: 26 August 1951
- Jurisdiction: Kingdom of Saudi Arabia
- Headquarters: Riyadh, Saudi Arabia
- Employees: 206,000
- Annual budget: 86,000,000,000 SR
- Minister responsible: Fahad Al-Jalajel
- Website: www.moh.gov.sa/en/

The Ministry of Health (MOH) (Arabic: وزارة الصحة) is a governmental body in the Saudi Cabinet created to develop and implement health policy, monitor and regulate the health sector, and protect and enhance public health to drive the realization of the country's vision for a vibrant, healthy society that serves as the nation's foundation for economic prosperity.

== History ==
The Ministry of Health (MOH) traces its origins to 1925, with the establishment of regional health departments, beginning in Mecca. As Saudi Arabia’s economy grew, the first national Ministry of Health was formed in 1950 under Minister Abdullah bin Faisal Al Saud. Over the decades, the MOH expanded healthcare infrastructure, building hospitals and clinics nationwide. Today, under Minister Fahad Al-Jalajel, the MOH continues to advance Saudi Arabia’s health sector, aligning with Vision 2030 to create a vibrant, healthy society in alignment with the nation's Quality of Life Program and social development aims.

=== Foundation of Ministry (1925-1960) ===
In 1925, Saudi Arabia's first public health department was established in Mecca. The department was founded with the aim to increase the quality and access to healthcare in the country. In the first few decades of its existence, the Ministry focused on the development of hospitals and other healthcare infrastructure in Saudi Arabia. Additional regulation was also added with healthcare centers enforcing regulations to provide necessary standards for practicing medicine and pharmacology. A public health council was also established to address the growing need for healthcare services, and it was the highest-level supervisory board, overseeing all aspects of the country's healthcare services.

The various healthcare institutions were merged to become a ministerial body in 1950. Abdullah bin Faisal Al Saud was the first health minister and served in the position for three years with his main role to set up the newly formed ministry. He served in the position for three years. He was replaced by Rashad Pharaon who was the personal doctor of King Abdulaziz, and he served in the post between 1954 and 1960.

=== Growing healthcare importance (1960s-1990s) ===
Following World War II, Saudi Arabia's oil production increased dramatically and many remote areas began to see an influx of workers to work in the oil industry. This meant that developing regions in the Kingdom required more healthcare infrastructure, which was subsequently provided. The initial management of this expansion in the early 1960s fell under the responsibility of Hassan bin Yousef Nassief and Hamid bin Mohammad Al Harsani, the third and fourth ministers of health. They each served a year in the position, from 1960 to 1962.

Later in the 1960s, the growth turned the country into a regional and global power. Following a number of conflicts in the 1960s and 1970s, Saudi Arabia's importance in the region grew. This continued rise in wealth meant that huge investments were made by the country's leaders, in order to improve the standard of living across the country. Health in the rural areas of the country became more accessible during this period, as communities that were once considered rural, were more integrated into society with the expansion of oil fields. This expansion required health facilities, which saw the first major rural expansion of medical care in the country's history. This was overseen by Dr. Yousef Bin Yaqoub Al Hairi and Shaikh Hassan bin Abdullah Aal Alshaikh, both of whom served as ministers of health in the mid to late 1960s.

Cities such as Riyadh and Jeddah saw their healthcare infrastructure grow substantially. The expansion of the city infrastructure was essential, with urbanization increasing in the country, with large corporations also moving their offices to the country with the growing economy. This early development was overseen by Dr. Jamil bin Ibrahim Al Hujailan and Dr. Abdulaziz bin Abdullah Al Khuwaiter, who served as ministers in the early 1970s. The economic expansion did not only lead to the development of hospitals for citizens but also care for the Kingdom's military. In the 1970s saw the construction of Riyadh Military Hospital and many other major infrastructure projects that led to more accessible healthcare. A number of years later saw the creation of King Khalid University Hospital was also completed. Dr. Hussain bin Abdulrazzaq Al Jazairy played a major role in the Kingdom's improved hospitals during his eight-year tenure between 1975 and 1983.

=== Recent history (1990s-present) ===
Towards the end of the 1990s, Dr. Faisal bin Abdulaziz Al Hujailan retired as minister of health after twelve years. He remains the longest-serving minister of health in Saudi Arabia's history. Al Hujailan's role as health minister was complex due to the turbulent times. In the wake of the invasion of Kuwait and the Battle of Khafji, caring for wounded soldiers became an additional burden.

In the early 21st century, two ministers played a major part in the development of new high-tech hospitals and infrastructure in many of the cities in the Kingdom. Of them, Hamad bin Abdullah Al Manie served between 2003 and 2009, with Abdullah bin Abdulaziz Al Rabiah serving for five years until 2014. Following Al Rabiah's departure, a number of well-known public officials served as ministers of health between 2014 and 2016. In total, five Ministers were appointed during this period, including Adel Fakeih, Dr. Mohammed Al-Hayaza and Khalid Al Falih.

A new minister of health was announced in early 2016 as Dr. Tawfig Al Rabiah.

The Kingdom has attempted to link lifestyle with health through a number of initiatives. This focused on attempting to solve the country's obesity issues. Taxes on unhealthy food products were introduced, as well as nutritional labeling. As part of the focus on tackling obesity, the health minister announced that the Kingdom would allow women to use women-only gyms. Local media had reported that women in the Kingdom often struggled to exercise enough during a typical day, which was leading to health issues in some women.

Until 2018, healthcare in schools fell under the stewardship of the Ministry of Education. It was proposed by the Ministry of Health that this should change and should be managed by the Ministry of Health. In 2018, the responsibility was officially transferred between the two ministries. Additionally, periodic health checks were introduced for Saudi pupils at specific grade intervals. In April 2018, The World Health Organization presented AlRabiah with certifications for two new health cities in the country. The cities were Diriyah and Jalajil. Awards were also later given for the cities of Unayzah and Riyadh Al Khabra.. Up to April 2026, a total of 16 Saudi cities have been accredited by the World Health Organization as “Healthy Cities.”

In February 2022, the Director-General of the World Health Organization (WHO) congratulated Saudi Arabia in eliminating Trachoma, a disease of the eye caused by infection with the bacterium Chlamydia trachomatis.

On 28 September 2025, the World Health Organization (WHO) and the United Nations Inter-Agency Task Force on the Prevention and Control of Noncommunicable Diseases (UNIATF) awarded Saudi Arabia’s Ministry of Health a 2025 UN Inter-Agency Task Force Award the Prevention and Control of Noncommunicable Diseases, at the 10th annual Friends of the Task Force Meeting in New York City, held during the 80th session of the United Nations General Assembly (UNGA 80).

On 27 February 2022, the Ministry of Health launched the first virtual hospital in the Kingdom.

Saudi Arabia has a life expectancy of 80 years (79 for males and 81 for females) according to the latest data for the year 2023 from the World Bank. Infant mortality in 2022 was 6 per 1000 (5 for males and 5 for females) 1000. In 2023, 71.8% of the adult population was overweight and 40.6% was obese.

== Services and strategies ==
=== National insurance agency ===
Under the leadership of Tawfig AlRabiah, it was announced that the Kingdom would be creating a national health insurance agency, which would be managed by the Ministry of Health. It was announced that implementation would begin in 2018 and would be regulated centrally, but medical services would be independently provided. The move meant that Saudi Arabia was one of the first countries in the Middle East to offer health insurance to its people.

=== Pilgrimage health ===
Saudi Arabia identified in the past decade that health concerns with pilgrims could cause severe problems to the country's infrastructure during the pilgrimage season. International Health Regulations were applied to pilgrims, in line with the World Health Organization following the discovery, which would give better medical protection to more than two million people annually. This protection is provided by 25 hospitals, 155 health centers and a workforce of 30,000 medical professionals in the country. As part of the same strategy, a new contingency and emergency planning were introduced by the Minister, with the creation of the Saudi Disaster Medical Assistance Team (S-DMAT). The newly formed relief team would be used during pilgrimage season, but could also be deployed to neighboring countries in times of crisis.

=== Apps ===
One major new service was the creation of eHealth Analytics, abbreviated to Seha. The platform allows Saudi citizens to connect with a physician via the Internet and remotely. The app 'Med Consult' was launched in collaboration with King Salman Center for Relief and Humanitarian Aid (KSRelief) and the support of the World Health Organization. This app enables visual communication to provide medical consultations among health practitioners in Low to Middle-Income Countries (LMIC) with consultants all over the world.

=== Artificial intelligence ===
Since the mid-2010s, the Ministry has had an increased focus on artificial intelligence. As a medium to long-term aim, trails and developments demonstrated how Saudi Arabia could become a pioneering country in medical AI. With partnerships with the likes of Siemens and Babylon Health, it is believed that AI operations and other advanced forms of AI could be tested in the country within the next decade.

=== Saudi Center for Disease Prevention and Control ===
In recent years, Saudi Arabia has created and developed the Saudi Center for Disease Prevention and Control (Weqaya), often abbreviated to CDC. The announcement of a newly formed CDC came in 2013, which became the first centralized facility of its kind in the Kingdom. The main goals of the facility were to research and treat various health issues across the country, while also conducting experiments. It was believed at the time of its creation, the CDC would dramatically boost the country's health sector.

A new commission was formed in 2016 to aid the treatment of Hepatitis C in the country. The aims of the commission are to eradicate the disease from the domestic population in the Kingdom. This also coincided with the creation of a new Saudi-made medicine that would be used to treat the virus. Wider initiatives on the treatment of disease were also implemented, with flu vaccinations becoming a focus. Between 2016 and 2018, vaccinations in the country quadrupled. The vaccinations were made possible with the launch of rural medical care in the country. Mobile primary care became a new initiative under the Minister's guidance, which meant rural citizens in the Kingdom could access health-related services more easily. The care industry in Saudi Arabia recognized that more people required home visits as part of a wider initiative to help the elderly and those less mobile. The Minister increased the number of services that could be implemented during home visits. It was estimated that 250,000 home visits were conducted by the end of 2018.

=== Tobacco clinics ===
As part of a move toward healthier citizens of the Kingdom, the Minister announced that there would be an expansion in the number of clinics to treat tobacco addiction. In order to reduce the number of people taking up smoking, the Kingdom also created a number of initiatives to take a stricter view on smoking as a whole. This included a tax increase on the sale of cigarettes. The University of Massachusetts also became involved in the initiatives, signing a partnership with the Kingdom to assist in the research of the treatment of tobacco addiction.

In order to reduce the number of people taking up smoking, the Kingdom created a number of initiatives to take a stricter view on smoking, which saw a 97% increase in anti-smoking clinics from 254 to 504 clinics, in addition to 100 mobile units for universities and education directorates. Meanwhile, focusing on community consciousness, the MOH achieved a 336% increase in the proportion of breast cancer screenings and screened 61,000, while 3.75 million people were given flu vaccination.

The then Minister of Health Dr. Tawfiq bin Fawzan Al-Rabiah received a global award on behalf of the Kingdom for combatting smoking through social awareness, treatment, and application of regulations. The award was presented as part of the 72nd session of the World Health Assembly, held in Geneva in May 2019. After becoming one of the first nations to ratify the WHO Framework Convention on Tobacco Control in 2005, it plans to reduce tobacco use from 12.7% in 2017, to 5% in 2030.

=== Youth health ===
Healthcare in schools until recently fell under the stewardship of the Ministry of Education. In 2018, the Council of Ministers transferred healthcare in schools to the Health Ministry. Following this, a thorough check was carried out into the processes at schools for children's health, and health checks for 339,825 pupils in 5,570 schools were implemented. In 2018, this was transferred across to the Health Ministry. Following this move, a thorough check was carried out into the processes at schools for children's health. It was decided that reform on health checks was required and subsequently implemented that all pupils in chosen grade intervals would have health checks.

As a wider move to improve health infrastructure in the Kingdom, the Minister opened a number of new Cardiac centers, both for operations and research. The new facilities totaled six by the end of 2018, with performance indicators suggesting heart operation success was up to 96%. Due to the Kingdom's growing population, the MOH launched the Newborn Screening Program, which includes hearing tests and heart examinations, covering up to 96% of the Kingdom's babies. Other highly specialized services are offered in parallel with the screening program.

== Vision 2030 ==
Healthcare and health infrastructure were a key performance indicators for Saudi Arabia's Vision 2030, a program to increase standards across the Kingdom in a number of fields. Following its introduction in 2013, a number of major milestones were reached. The development of remote health meant that the 937 Call Center received a total of 3 million calls in 2018, this more than doubled from the 1.4 million the year prior.

As part of the ongoing efforts to transform the digital interaction patients have in the country, a new app 'Mawid' was introduced to centralize health bookings. 10 million bookings have been made since its introduction, with five million using the app last year. Seha was also a success, allowing patients to speak remotely to a doctor or medical professional. It is believed that 300,000 people used the app in 2018 alone.

Raising the levels of productivity, efficiency, and quality of performance in the provision of health services in hospitals, the Ministry is implementing the program «Health Performance - Ada'a» towards achieving the Saudi Vision 2030, and currently includes 98.8% of hospitals, where more than 40 indicators are used to measure performance in 7 service hubs, wherein positive results were achieved in reducing waiting periods in emergency and outpatient clinics. Enhancing Traffic Safety is one of the Kingdom's goals in its 2030 vision. The Minister of Health is part of a ministerial committee overlooking the implementation of many initiatives and projects in all aspects of Traffic Safety dimensions, which focuses on enforcement, engineering, education, and emergency response. These efforts resulted in the reduction of fatalities by 33%, injuries by 21%, and motor vehicle accidents by 34% in the last two years. Fatalities per 100,000 had been reduced from 28.8 in 2016 to 17.7 in 2018. The Kingdom is aiming to be the best in class in road safety by 2030.

To strengthen the role of the private sector, the MOH has introduced electronic licensing services for medical facilities. Prior to the introduction of this license, the process used to take 120 days in many cases. The MOH has also enabled the sector to monitor itself through the self-assessment service, followed by inspections of health establishments to ensure that they are free of harmful health practices.

== Alternative care ==
Healthcare services in Saudi Arabia are provided by several public and private agencies. However, the ministry is the major planner and provider of these services.

== 937 Call Center ==
In line with the Saudi Vision 2030, the Saudi Ministry of Health introduced the 937 Call Center, which uses a toll-free number to provide medical services. The Center provides high-quality and immediate emergency assistance to patients as it fulfills their medical needs and requirements.

The 937 number was an instant success in the Kingdom and by 2017 had reached a million annual medical calls. As the service grew, so did the quality of the medical feedback, with satisfaction ratings increasing 25% in less than one year. Once the call center passed one million annual calls, it continued to grow, processing 80,000 calls a week by the end of 2018.

The call center can also process and book appointments with a medical professional should it be required, which can be now done digitally since the introduction of a centralized booking system, known as Mawid. The system can also be used for referrals for the first time, so physicians can refer patients to a hospital for a specific reason using the system. The most notable thing about this is not the technology, but that it is provided free of charge to Saudi Arabian citizens and residents. When compared to US services, many similar offerings are privatized and operated by for-profit companies, such as WebMD.

== Seha Virtual Hospital ==
In line with the Saudi Vision 2030, the Saudi Ministry of Health launched the first virtual hospital in the Kingdom. The Seha Virtual Hospital (SVH) aims to promote virtual healthcare, achieve innovation in the health sector, develop resources, and achieve sustainability in addition to achieving institutional excellence. SVH connects 224 hospitals and offers 44 specialized services across the Kingdom. Specialized services in the SVH include emergency and critical advice, specialized clinics, multidisciplinary committees, medical support services, and home care services. In early November 2023, the SVH won the Zimam Award for Digital Health after being recognized as the best business incubator for the Safe Environment Incubator Project (Sandbox) in the field of innovation in the Arab region for 2023. In October 2024, the SVH received the Guinness World Record as the Largest Virtual Hospital during the Global Health Exhibition 2024 in Riyadh.

== The Innovation Center ==
The Innovation Center at the Ministry of Health (Saudi Arabia) is a national platform established under the Saudi Vision 2030 to foster a culture of innovation and creative problem-solving in the healthcare sector. The center supports the transformation of employee-driven ideas into scalable solutions through initiatives such as Innovate with an Idea, Pioneers Award, and Seha-thon. It plays a pivotal role in developing strategic partnerships with hospitals, universities, and technology accelerators to promote healthcare innovation. The center has also been recognized for piloting novel technologies, including virtual reality in vaccinations, and contributed to the national deployment of pioneering cardiac procedures.

== Ada’a Health Center ==
Ada’a Health Center (Arabic: مركز أداء الصحة) is the national healthcare performance management center of the Saudi Ministry of Health (MOH) Ministry of Health (Saudi Arabia). It originated in 2016 as the Patient-Centered Performance (PCP) Program, the Ministry’s first initiative for healthcare performance measurement, introducing the first healthcare performance indicators across MOH facilities. As its role expanded, the program evolved into Ada’a Health, extending its scope to public, private, military, and other governmental healthcare sectors across Saudi Arabia. Aligned with Saudi Vision 2030 and the Health Sector Transformation Program, Ada’a Health develops and oversees national performance indicators, clinical audit programs, benchmarking systems, and the Healthcare Quality Index (HQI).. Its methodology integrates performance governance, clinical governance, data integrity, benchmarking, and continuous quality improvement. Key achievements include establishing the Kingdom’s first unified healthcare performance indicator framework, developing the Healthcare Quality Index (HQI), launching the Ada’a Health Performance Award. obtaining CQI-IRCA accreditation, publishing national healthcare performance reports, and receiving international recognition for advancing healthcare performance excellence and organizational improvement.

== National Health Command and Control Center (NHCC) ==
The National Health Command and Control Center (NHCC) is a national center under the Ministry of Health (Saudi Arabia). Established in October 2019, the Center has evolved into a key national platform supporting the monitoring, coordination, and management of healthcare operations across Saudi Arabia.

NHCC integrates and analyzes health data to enable evidence-based decision-making, enhance operational efficiency, and strengthen the responsiveness and preparedness of the healthcare system. Through advanced analytics and real-time monitoring, it provides national-level visibility into healthcare performance, capacity, and operational indicators.

The Center supports coordination among healthcare entities and operational centers, contributing to improved resource utilization, service quality, and system-wide integration.

Aligned with Saudi Vision 2030 and the Transformation of the National Health Sector Program, NHCC contributes to advancing data-driven decision-making and digital health capabilities.

The Center also collaborates with national and international organizations, academic institutions, and strategic partners to exchange expertise and advance innovation in healthcare management.

In April 2026, NHCC was designated a Collaborating Center by the World Health Organization (WHO)..

== Ministry's Response to COVID-19 ==
By the end of December 2019, China witnessed a widespread of acute pneumonia cases, later known as Coronavirus disease 2019 COVID-19. Thereafter, countries around the world started preparedness and response efforts, in different ways at different times, in an attempt to limit the spread of COVID-19.

The Kingdom of Saudi Arabia was one of the first countries that started precautionary and preventive measures and anticipated the danger of this disease, which turned into a global pandemic within a short period of time. The Kingdom did not limit its efforts to curb COVID-19 to the local level, as it also expanded them to the international level, given its political, strategic, and economic roles. These are evident with the Kingdom's leadership role during its presidency of the G20 for the year 2020. Moreover, several international bodies and media channels praised the Kingdom's efforts at the national and international levels to strengthen response, develop a treatment, and ensure the availability of preventive equipment, as well as its $500 million contributions to support global efforts to curb the pandemic. This support is part of the Kingdom's commitment to fund international organizations according to the agreements announced at the G20 extraordinary summit initiated by the Kingdom.

The Kingdom of Saudi Arabia participated in a pledging conference hosted by the European Commission and associated with efforts to support the Access to COVID-19 Tools Accelerator (ACT Accelerator). Saudi Arabia was among the participants in the global initiative, which sought to promote equitable access to COVID-19 diagnostics, therapeutics, and vaccines.

The ACT Accelerator brought together governments, international organizations, and other stakeholders to coordinate efforts related to the development, production, and distribution of COVID-19 diagnostic tools, treatments, and vaccines.

Owing to the experience that the Kingdom accumulated over the years in risk management and assessment to secure national and global health, ensure the security and the safety of Hajj and Umrah pilgrims every year, and develop a health system, and to its previous experience in curbing the Middle East Respiratory Syndrome (MERS-CoV); the Kingdom took several early, evidence-based precautionary measures.

The Kingdom's success in "flattening the epidemic curve", is thanks to the strict measures it took early based on scientific evidence and previous experiences, the attack rate in the country was 9 cases per 1,000 population, tests were conducted at a rate of 13,000 tests per 100,000 population, and the case fatality rate was at 1% compared to 3.47% globally, as of 23 August 2020. Although COVID-19 has the same origins as MERS-CoV and the Severe Acute Respiratory Syndrome (SARS), the development of COVID-19 is not yet fully clear.

The Kingdom's leadership relied on its previous experience with the spread of the MERS-CoV to take a series of proactive and precautionary measures to curb COVID-19 before the first case was confirmed in the country on 2 March 2020. These measures included activating Command and Control Centers (CCCs), suspending travel to China, and suspending entry to the Kingdom using tourist visas. On 28 February, the Minister of Foreign Affairs of Saudi Arabia announced the temporary suspension of entry for Gulf Cooperation Council (GCC) citizens to Mecca and Medina. Citizens of the GCC who had been in Saudi Arabia for more than 14 consecutive days and didn't show any symptoms of the COVID-19 would be excluded from this rule. After the first case was confirmed in the Kingdom, firm and effective precautionary measures were taken to impose social distancing, and strengthen key capabilities and resources on several fronts for virus containment, prevention, preparedness, detection, and treatment, as part of an integrated national approach to combating the pandemic. Some of these measures included the suspension of Umrah, education, and all international and domestic flights; the launch of Mass field testing; and the expansion of laboratory capacity to conduct over nine million COVID-19 tests. On 19 March, Saudi Arabia suspended the holding of daily prayers and the Friday prayers in and outside the two mosques in Mecca and Medina to limit the spread of coronavirus. Similar measures were carried out across the country during the same week. On 20 March, Saudi Arabia suspended entry and praying to the general public at the two Holy Mosques in Mecca and Medina to limit the spread of the coronavirus. Other measures included a partial then total curfew in various regions of the Kingdom, and the decision to treat all citizens, legal and illegal residents for free without any consequences.

The Kingdom's Position among the G20 Countries

While the Kingdom, chair to the G20 summit for 2020, many of these countries are still recording varying numbers of COVID-19 confirmed cases and deaths. The Kingdom had the lowest COVID-19 case fatality rates at lower than 1%, while Italy and France had the highest rate at 15%, and China had a rate of 5%.

Risk Assessment

Since the beginning of the pandemic, the Kingdom has based its decisions on the risk assessment of the COVID-19 spread at the international and domestic levels. The "Jeddah Tool" was used to conduct a strategic assessment of the health risks of Umrah and Hajj due to the pandemic. This assessment revealed that the risks of Umrah were "extremely high". Accordingly, a recommendation was made and a decision was issued to suspend Umrah. "Salem COVID Tool" was used to assess the health risks of COVID-19 in mass gatherings and events, which resulted in the cancellation and suspension of many events before a curfew was imposed. "Jeddah" and "Salem COVID" tools are scientific risk assessment tools that the Ministry of Health's Global Center for Mass Gatherings Medicine (GCMGM), a WHO collaborating center, developed based on scientific methods and reviewed and studied its application several times.

Precautionary measures

The Ministry announced several precautionary measures for the general public to limit the spread of COVID-19, such as:

- Avoid going out unless necessary
- Stay at home if one suspects having COVID-19 symptoms
- Self-isolate at home and report anyone who has symptoms
- Provide educational materials for the community
- Suspend all gatherings and promote the "We Are All Responsible" campaign
- Ban gatherings in residences, workplaces, and businesses.

Hajj 2020 - A success story

Hajj for the year 1441 AH (2020G) was organized with many efforts and cooperation of the authorities under these exceptional circumstances. The Kingdom applied meticulous and multi-stage procedures to select a limited number of pilgrims from different nationalities from within the Kingdom, with the aim of reducing and preventing health risks for pilgrims and workers. This included close monitoring and conducting tests before, during, and after the Hajj period for the selected few. There were no COVID-19 reported cases.

Risk Communication and Community Engagement

Strategic and effective tasks were completed in cooperation with the relevant authorities to communicate with the community and engage it, under MOH's leadership. Which is centered around traditional channels of communications through TVs, radios, and text messages, as well as technology and digital health programs, through the optimal use of media by publishing the most prominent developments about the pandemic and developing awareness campaigns through its website https://covid19awareness.sa/ aimed at spreading awareness among the community, as well as through WhatsApp messages and the use of various electronic applications such as "Tetamman" and "Mawid" applications.

Further actions that took place included daily joint press conferences to highlight the latest updates, the production of high-quality media materials by the Ministry of Health, Ministry of Media, and the Center for Government Communication, and awareness campaigns to urge citizens to stay at home for their safety.

E-health

- Developed the 937 hotline to support the community by answering inquiries, giving instructions and providing medical and psychological consultations on all aspects related to COVID-19 around the clock;
- Launched additional channels to reach the community in addition to the existing channels, such as offering the 937-health service on WhatsApp using a chatbot on the number 920005937 to provide advice and educational information on COVID-19, as well as launching the Sign Language Application "Eshara", to reach deaf people and provide them with services and information;
- Activated the role of virtual clinics, telemedicine, teleconsultation, tele-radiology, and robotics use to prevent the spread of COVID-19.
- Started tracking and tracing in drawings, and then immediately taking action to digitize the same.
- Aside from the "Taqasi" track and trace platform, through which suspected and confirmed cases can be reported, the Ministry of Health launched or revamped several other apps to help fight COVID-19.
- An existing e-consultation health app called "Sehha", which uses AI-enhanced chatbots, was updated to be able to identify potential infections and facilitate communication with isolated patients.
- The Saudi Data and Artificial Intelligence Authority (SDAIA) also launched an exposure notification and distancing application called " Tabaud", which uses Bluetooth to alert individuals who may have come in contact with infected people. A central data warehouse is also being used, where COVID-19 information is aggregated, analyzed, and reported.

Coronavirus Vaccination Campaign

Saudi Arabia started registration for the vaccinations through its Sehaty app in early December 2020. And with the arrival of COVID vaccines, and after being approved by the Saudi Food and Drug Authority (SFDA), Saudi Arabia became one of the first countries in the Arab world on 17 December 2020, to launch its coronavirus vaccination campaign by administering the first doses of Pfizer-BioNTech vaccine to healthcare workers and the elderly Saudis and expats who had registered through the Sehaty app. Coronavirus vaccination centers are spread in all the regions of Saudi Arabia.

The registrations registered a three-fold increase after HRH Crown Prince Mohammad Bin Salman was administered the vaccine.

Thereafter, Saudi Arabia witnessed a tremendous response after the Custodian of the Two Holy Mosques King Salman received the vaccination.

Vaccination centers also opened in Jeddah, Dammam, Medina, and Mecca, and in February 2021 in other regions as part of the second phase of the campaign.

The Ministry of Health also launched the mobile coronavirus vaccination service by vaccinating people inside their cars.

The vaccination campaign is going in full swing and more than 780 thousand people have been vaccinated until the end of February 2021.

More than 42 million COVID-19 vaccine doses have been administered in Saudi Arabia until the end of September 2021, with more than 53 percent of the country's 34.8 million population completing the course. The number of COVID-19 doses administered in Saudi Arabia until the end of January 2022 increased to more than 57 million doses. At the end of February 2022, the immunization rate in the Kingdom reached 99% among those aged above 12. More than 67 million COVID-19 vaccine doses have been administered in Saudi Arabia until the end of August 2022, with more than 77 percent of the country's 34.8 million population completing the course.

Results and Success Lessons

- Holding a daily press conference at a fixed time by MOH's official spokesperson
- Sending over 6.6 billion awareness text messages in several languages
- Reaching over 150 million views for educational videos, with over 9 million people benefitting from field awareness campaigns
- Reaching over four million followers on the Ministry's Twitter and @saudiMOH937 accounts, with the most popular tweets being about COVID-19 and its prevention
- 937 line received over 10 million calls, including inquiries about COVID-19
- Telemedicine services provided over five million consultations
- MOH's COVID-19 prevention website in various languages reached over 15 million visitors
- More than 1.5 million beneficiaries from the Tetamman application.

== Ministers of Health ==
Name of Minister	Period of Service
Abdullah bin Faisal Al Saud	1950-1953
Dr. Rashad bin Mahmoud Pharaon	1953-1960
Dr. Hassan bin Yousef Nassief	1960-1961
Dr. Hamid bin Mohammad Al Harsani	1961-1962
Dr. Yousef Bin Yaqoub Al Hairi	1962-1966
Hassan bin Abdullah Aal Alshaikh	1966-1970
Jamil bin Ibrahim Al Hujailan	1970-1974
Dr. Abdulaziz bin Abdullah Al Khuwaiter	1974-1975
Dr. Hussain bin Abdulrazzaq Al Jazairy	1975-1982
Dr. Ghazi bin Abdulrahman Al Qasabi	1982-1983
Dr. Faisal bin Abdulaziz Al Hujailan	1983-1995
Dr. Osama bin Abdulmageed Shobukshi	1995-2003
Hamad bin Abdullah Al Manie	2003-2009
Abdullah bin Abdulaziz Al Rabeeah	2009-2014
Adel Fakeih	2014-2015
Dr. Mohammed Al-Hayaza	2015
Ahmed Al Khateeb	2015
Mohamad Al ash Sheikh	2015
Khalid Al Falih	2015-2016
Dr. Tawfig Al Rabiah	2016–2021
Eng. Fahad Al-Jalajel	2021–present

== See also ==
- Ministries of Saudi Arabia
- Saudi Arabia
- Health care in Saudi Arabia
- Saudi Commission for Health Specialties
