= Ahmed Al Khateeb =

Saudi Arabian bureaucrat

His Excellency Ahmed Al Khateeb
- أحمد الخطيب
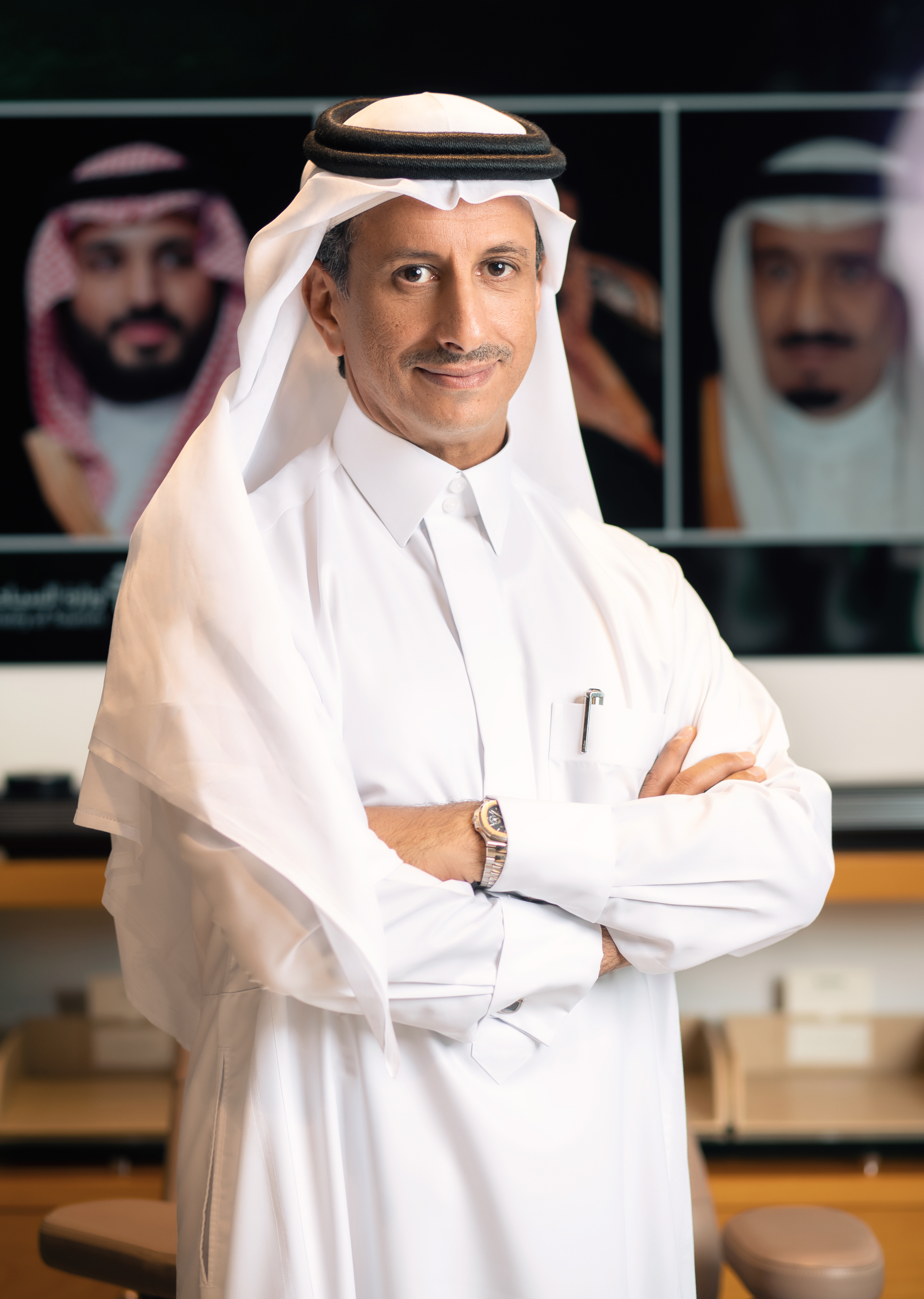
- Official portrait, 2019

Minister of Tourism
- Incumbent
- Assumed office February 2020

Minister of Health
- In office 29 January 2015 – 11 April 2015
- Preceded by: Mohammed Al-Hayaza
- Succeeded by: Mohamad Al ash Sheikh

Personal details
- Born: 1965 (age 60–61) Riyadh
- Education: King Saud University (BA), Dalhousie University (Diploma in Wealth Management)

Ahmed bin Aqil al-Khateeb (Arabic: أحمد الخطيب) is a Saudi Arabian government official and former banker who has served as Minister of Tourism of Saudi Arabia since February 2020. He previously led the country's General Entertainment Authority as its inaugural president between May 2016 and June 2018 and was previously Minister of Health from January to April 2015. He is also a former advisor at the Saudi Royal Court and has served as the chairman of Saudi Arabian Military Industries as well as the Saudi Fund for Development.

== Early life and career ==
Al Khateeb was born in Riyadh in 1965. He graduated with a Bachelor of Arts in Business Administration from King Saud University and subsequently gained a diploma in Wealth Management from Dalhousie University in Canada.

In 1992, Al Khateeb joined Riyad Bank and worked on the establishment of its Customer Investment department. He worked for eleven years in different departments of the firm. In 2003, he joined SABB Bank and participated in the establishment of Islamic banking (Amanah) before moving to SABB's Private Services division as a general manager.

In 2006, he established Jadwa Investment Company and later joined the Court of Crown Prince Mohammed bin Salman as an advisor, counseling the Minister of Defense and the manager of the Ministry of Defense development project. Al Khateeb then moved to work as an advisor in the Saudi Royal Court.

In June 2022, he was recognized by the International Hospitality Institute on the Global 100 in Hospitality, a list featuring the 100 Most Powerful People in Global Hospitality.

== Current positions ==
- Minister of Tourism
- Chairman of board of directors for the Saudi Arabian Military Industries (SAMI)
- Heads the committee of Quality of Life Program
- Chairman of board of directors for the Saudi Fund for Development
- Advisor to the Council of Ministers General Secretariat
- Advisor to the Minister of Defense

== Membership ==
- Secretary General and member of the board of directors for Diriyah Gate Development Authority
- Board member at the General Authority for Military Industries
- Board member at the Council of Economic and Development Affairs
- Board member at the Public Investment Fund
- Board member at the National Development Fund

== Previous positions ==
- Chairman of Board of Directors for the Kingdom's General Entertainment Authority (2015-2018)
- Minister of Health (2015)
- Established Jadwa Investment Company (2006)
- Advisor to Crown Prince at the Royal Court
- Establishment of the Islamic Banking (Amanah)- SABB Bank (2003)
- Establishment of the Customer Investment Department at Bank of Riyadh (1992)
- General Manager of Private Services at SABB Bank
