= Mohammed Al-Hayaza =

Saudi chemist and politician

Prof. Mohammed A. Al-Hayaza
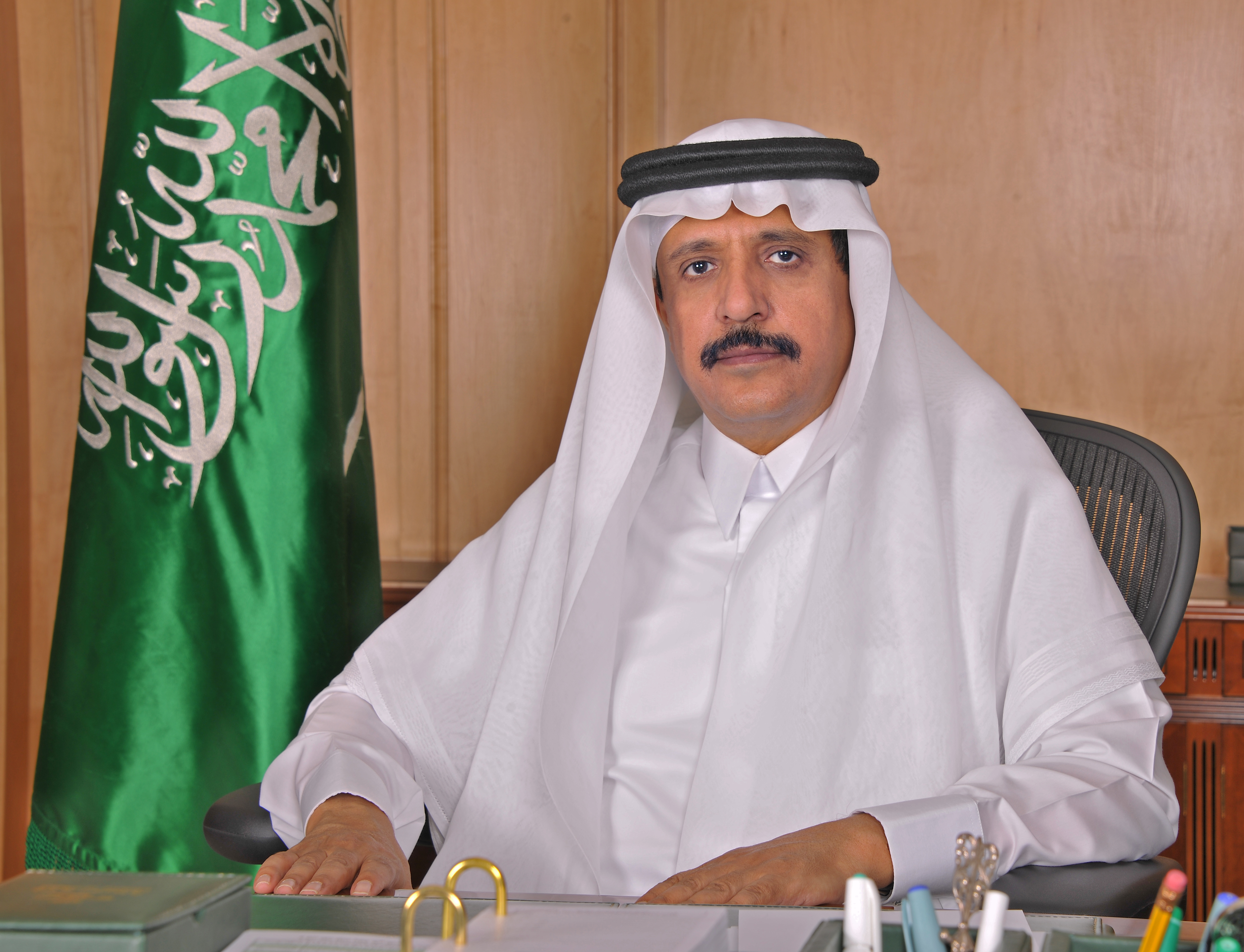

Member of The Education & Training Evaluation Commission Board
- In office March 2020 – Present
- Monarch: King Salman

Member of The Universities Affairs Council
- In office February 2020 – Present
- Monarch: King Salman

Chairman of Misk Schools Board
- In office June 2019 – Present
- Monarch: King Salman

Member of KAUST Board of Trustees
- In office April 2018 – Present
- Monarch: King Salman

President of Alfaisal University
- In office March 2015 – Present
- Monarch: King Salman

Member of The Shura Council
- In office February 2015 – November 2016
- Monarch: King Salman

Minister of Health
- In office December 2014 – January 2015
- Monarch: King Abdullah

President of Jazan University
- In office January 2007 – December 2014
- Monarch: King Abdullah

Vice President for Post Graduate Studies and Research, King Khalid University
- In office October 2002 – November 2007
- Monarchs: King Abdullah, King Fahd

Personal details
- Born: December 30, 1959 (age 66) Asir, Saudi Arabia
- Spouse: Prof.Mona Al-Mushait
- Children: Eng.Waleed, Dr.Ghada, Dr.Raid, Dr.Rami
- Education: 1981- B.S. in Chemistry King Saud University, 1988- M.S. in Chemistry Boston University, 1992- Ph.D. in Organic Chemistry
- Alma mater: King Saud University; Boston University

Mohammed bin Ali Al-Hayaza (Arabic: محمد بن علي آل هيازع) is a Saudi chemist and politician, who has been the president of Alfaisal University since 1 March 2015. During his term as president, Alfaisal University has risen from one of the Top 800 (2017) to one of the Top 300 (2020) universities in the world according to the Times Higher Education World University Rankings, though the university has faced criticism for its claims of being the best University in the Arab world and in Saudi Arabia.

Alhayaza also serves as the Chairman of Misk schools board, a member of King Abdullah University of Science and Technology (KAUST) board of trustees, member of the first universities affairs council and member of the education and training evaluation commission board. Prior to joining Alfaisal, Al-Hayaza served as the vice president for post Graduate Studies and Research in King Khalid University from 2002-2007 and the president of Jazan University from 2007 to 2014. At the time of his appointment, Jazan University had only three colleges and 3,000 students, but expanded to 40 colleges with an enrollment of 70,000 students during his presidency. Later, he was appointed as health minister in 2014. In 2015, Al-Hayaza was appointed to the Shoura Council, where he served until 2016.
