= Alfaisal University =

Private university in Riyadh, Saudi Arabia

- جامعة الفيصل
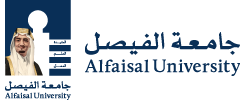
- Motto: Faith, Knowledge and Performance
- Type: Private nonprofit university
- Established: 2002; 24 years ago
- Chairman: Khalid bin Faisal Al Saud
- President: Prof.Mohammed Alhayaza
- Faculty: 331
- Students: 7,124
- Location: Riyadh, Riyadh Province, Saudi Arabia; 24°39′51″N 46°40′35″E
- Campus: Urban
- Language: English
- Colors: Blue and purple
- Website: alfaisal.edu

Alfaisal University is a private university in Riyadh, Saudi Arabia, located in the compound enclosing the vicinity of the al-Ma'dhar Palace. Established in 2002, the institute offers courses in various subjects up to post graduation and is named after King Faisal bin Abdulalziz.

The university was founded by the King Faisal Foundation and admitted its first students in 2008. In the 2025–2026 academic year, it had 7,124 enrolled students. In 2024–2025, it reported 2,155 international students from 53 countries and 331 faculty members. Members of the Board of Trustees are appointed by the King Faisal Foundation.

== Academics ==
Alfaisal University is organized into six colleges: the College of Business, the College of Science and General Studies, the College of Medicine, the College of Engineering and Advanced Computing, the College of Law and International Relations, and the College of Pharmacy. Its academic departments cover fields including business, engineering and advanced computing, medicine, pharmacy, science, and law and international relations.

== Accreditation ==
Alfaisal University is accredited by the Saudi Ministry of Education and institutionally accredited by the National Center for Academic Accreditation and Evaluation.

== Ranking ==
Alfaisal University has appeared in several international rankings. Its results differ between overall rankings and rankings restricted by institutional age or size.

In the 2026 Center for World University Rankings (CWUR), the university was ranked 1,737th globally and 19th in Saudi Arabia. In the 2026 uniRank ranking, it was ranked 25th in Saudi Arabia and 5,254th globally. It is not listed in the Academic Ranking of World Universities.

In the Times Higher Education (THE) World University Rankings, the university was placed in the 251–300 band in 2020, 201–250 in 2022, 301–350 in 2023, 501–600 in 2024, 601–800 in 2025, and 501–600 in 2026.

In the QS World University Rankings, the university was placed in the 651–700 band in 2023, 731–740 in 2024, 791–800 in 2025, and 801–850 in 2026. Its QS 2026 indicator scores were Academic Reputation 4.8/100, Citations per Faculty 10.6/100, Employer Reputation 5.9/100, and Employment Outcomes 5.7/100, alongside an International Faculty Ratio of 100/100.

On the official Webometrics Ranking of World Universities, the university was ranked 2,469th globally and 19th nationally in the July 2026 edition. In 2018 the university was ranked 2,031st globally and 9th nationally.

In November 2020, the university announced that it had ranked first in Saudi Arabia and the Arab region, and 31st worldwide, in THE's Young University Rankings, which cover institutions under 50 years old. In the same ranking, it was placed 36th in 2022, 51st in 2023, and 189th in 2024.

The university separately announced tenth place in THE's Best Small Universities ranking for 2020 and joint ninth place for 2021; the 2021 list was topped by the California Institute of Technology. Eligibility for this ranking required institutions to appear in THE's overall ranking, teach more than four subjects, and have fewer than 5,000 students. In the 2024 edition of the small-university ranking, the university was placed 36th. It was ranked 20th in THE's Emerging Economies University Rankings 2020.

Discrepancies between claimed and actual ranking positions have been documented across Saudi universities. In December 2024, El País reported that Saudi institutions had paid foreign researchers up to €70,000 a year to falsely claim Saudi affiliations, artificially inflating their positions in international rankings. In a 2020 article titled "University rankings are mostly meaningless" the Asia Times cited the university's placement in THE's Emerging Economies rankings as an example of methodological weakness in those rankings.

== See also ==
- List of universities in Saudi Arabia
