= Riyadh Valley Co =

Riyadh Valley Co (formally known as: Riyadh Techno Valley; RTV) is one of the contributions of King Saud University in building partnership with the public and private sectors in the area of knowledge economics. The Kingdom of Saudi Arabia has adopted a long term economic strategy that shifts its focus to develop a knowledge-based economy. King Saud University (KSU) is seeking to play a full part in this strategy through the development of a substantial science and technology park, “Riyadh Techno Valley - King Saud University (RTV-KSU)”, on its Riyadh campus. Through this project, KSU aims to satisfy the demands of the knowledge-based industries, and to commercialize its research outcomes, in addition to enhancing the research environment and encouraging researchers and graduates to participate in the incubation program and to establish spin-off knowledge-based companies.

== Vision ==
To be a leading university technology park that promotes the culture of innovation and competence for its associated knowledge-based institutions and business partners.

== Mission ==
Providing a stimulating and attractive environment for R&D, which will contribute to achieving sustainability in development, as well as enhancing competitiveness of the national economy.

== Objectives ==
• Transferring and developing technology to serve the national economy and achieve sustainable development. • Promoting the university’s cooperation with research and developing centers locally and internationally. • Creating a stimulating and attractive environment for local and global investment by establishing specialized firms in research and development. • Discovering, attracting and adopting innovators from within and outside the Kingdom. • Enhancing the utilization of knowledge and skills of all university students to achieve harmony between the output of education and the demands of industry. • Generating distinguished job opportunities in knowledge industry arenas.

== History ==
On 19 October 1426 Hijri The Council of Ministers approved the 8th Development Plan of the Kingdom of Saudi Arabia which included the call for the "establishment of science parks at universities and research centers", and to direct "more attention to the promotion of co-financing and joint research programs between industry and public sector institutions, and the establishment of business incubators in order to transform research results into industrial and commercial applications." Thus, on 20 November 1429 Hijri the King Saud University Council passed a resolution approving the creation of the Riyadh Techno Valley.

== Value of King Saud University ==
Many factors distinguish King Saud University as a unique scientific and educational institution including:

• Located uniquely in the capital of the Kingdom.

• Having the King Abdullah Institute for Nanotechnology & Prince Sultan Institute for Advanced Technology on its premises, along with laboratories and research centers in America, China, Germany, Sweden, and the United Kingdom.

• Ranking as number one in the Arab world for patents registered.

• Enjoying infrastructure valued over 70 billion Saudi Riyal, ($18.7 billion).

• Benefiting from a global network of alliances with top universities and research centers in more than 12 developed countries.

• Signing service contracts with 14 Nobel Prize winners in various scientific specialties.

== Main Research Areas of RTV ==
Three areas of research and technology have been proposed for the Valley as a result of feasibility studies based on the needs of the local and global market and the overall trend of the strategic plans of the Saudi Arabia, while keeping in mind the research areas that characterize the university. The feasibility studies were conducted by firms of international experience specialized in science parks.

• Chemicals Technologies and Materials. • Biological, Agricultural, and Environmental technologies. • Information and Communications Technologies.

=== Chemical Technology and Materials ===
This research area has been selected for its importance of chemical and petroleum research and its subsidiary specialties for the Kingdom and because King Saud University is characterized by distinct possibilities for research in this field. The four sub-areas of research are: • Petrochemicals technologies • Chemicals technologies • Materials technologies • Renewable Energy

=== Biological, Agricultural, and Environmental Technologies ===
This unique area links the strategic needs of the Kingdom in the areas of health and food to the progress of research at the university in these technologies. It is compatible with the results of local and international industry market analysis, as well as the trends and mergers in the international biological, environmental and agricultural technologies sector. The three sub-areas of research are:

• Pharmaceutical technologies. • Environmental technologies. • Food science and agricultural technologies.

=== Information and Communications Technologies (ICT) ===
This area of research and development has been selected in view of the remarkable expansion and competition in the market of information and communications technology in the Middle East with the growing demand for various telecommunications services and high speed internet, as evident in surveys conducted by King Abdullah Institute for Research and Consulting Studies. This area of research also supports other research areas in the Valley.

The sub-areas of research include:

- ICT
- Information security
- Electronic Services
- Software Engineering

== Support and Recreational Zones of RTV ==
Two zones dedicated to support services, housing, and recreation are also important parts of RTV. These are:

=== Scientific Village ===
The residential, recreational, and educational zone of the project.

=== Central Core ===
The pulsating heart of the science park, which contains the Incubation Center, the Center for Entrepreneurs, Technology Transfer Office, in addition to the Office of Support Services and Operations, and the laboratories to serve the local market, as well as governmental centers for research and development.
