= Fahad Al-Jalajel =

Saudi Arabian politician (born 1978)

His Excellency Fahad Al-Jalajel
- فهد بن عبدالرحمن الجلاجل
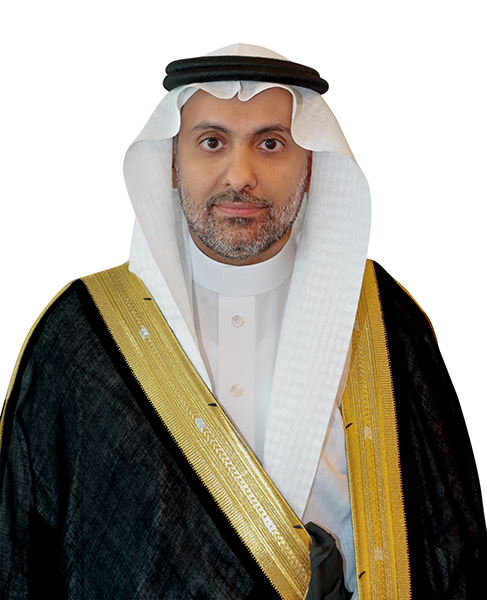
- Al-Jalajel in 2021

Minister of Health
- Incumbent
- Assumed office 15 October 2021
- Monarch: Salman
- Prime Minister: Salman (2021–2022); Mohammad bin Salman (2022–present)
- Preceded by: Dr. Tawfig Al-Rabiah

Personal details
- Born: 17 August 1978 (age 48)
- Education: King Saud University; MIT Sloan School of Management; Saint Joseph's University

Fahad bin Abdul-Rahman Al-Jalajel (Arabic: فهد بن عبدالرحمن الجلاجل) is the Minister of Health of Saudi Arabia since 15 October 2021.

== Early life and education ==
Al-Jalajel was born in Riyadh, Saudi Arabia, on 17 August 1978. He studied at King Saud University, Saudi Arabia during the 1990s in Riyadh. He holds an Executive Certificate in leadership and management from MIT Sloan School of Management in the United States, a master's degree in computer science from Saint Joseph's University in Pennsylvania in the United States, and BSc in computer science from King Saud University.

== Professional life ==
In 2012, Fahd Al-Jalajel was appointed as the Undersecretary for Consumer Affairs in the Ministry of Commerce and Industry (Saudi Arabia) (currently the Ministry of Commerce (Saudi Arabia). He was an Advisor to the Minister of Commerce and Industry and General Supervisor of Information Technology in the ministry. He was also the acting Director-General of Information Technology in The General Investment Authority (currently the Ministry of Investment (Saudi Arabia) as well as Director of Networks and Operations. He was also the Director of the Open Source Operating Systems Project (the Computer Society and King Abdulaziz City for Science and Technology).

Al-Jalajel was a member of a number of councils and committees, including a member of the Executive Council of Medical Cities, a member of the Health Insurance Council, a member of the board of directors of General Organization of Saudi Airlines, a member of the Competition Protection Council, and a board member of the General Organization for Grains, Silos and Flour Mills.
