= Saudi Fund for Development =

Saudi Arabian government agency

Saudi Fund for Development (SFD)
- Native name: الصندوق السعودي للتنمية
- Founded: 1 March 1975; 51 years ago
- Headquarters: Riyadh, Saudi Arabia
- Key people: Ahmed Al-Khateeb (Chairman); Sultan bin Abdulrahman Al-Marshad (CEO)
- Website: www.sfd.gov.sa/en

The Saudi Fund for Development (SFD) (Arabic: الصندوق السعودي للتنمية) is a Saudi Arabian government agency that provides development assistance to developing countries by financing social and infrastructure projects. Established in 1974 and operational since 1975, the SFD reports to the National Development Fund (NDF) while maintaining an independent legal and financial status.

As of 2024, marking its 50th anniversary, the SFD has financed over 800 development projects in more than 100 countries, with total contributions exceeding $20 billion. The fund's legal capital is SAR 25 billion (approximately $6.7 billion).

== History ==
The SFD was established by Royal Decree No. M/48 on 1 September 1974, under the leadership of King Faisal bin Abdulaziz Al Saud. The decision followed the 1973 oil boom, which increased state revenues and enabled Saudi Arabia to expand its international aid initiatives. The fund was created to promote "solidarity with developing nations" and "long-term socioeconomic development" through structured financial assistance. In its early years, the SFD focused on infrastructure development, such as roads, hospitals, and educational facilities, primarily in Arab and Muslim-majority countries.

== Governance and Legal Framework ==
The SFD operates with an independent legal and financial personality but reports to the National Development Fund (NDF), which oversees several development funds in the Kingdom. The fund is managed by a ten-member Board of Directors, with its Chairman appointed by the Prime Minister. The board includes the CEO, a representative from the NDF, and seven members with relevant experience who are appointed for three-year terms.

The fund's law specifies lending limits: no single project can receive financing exceeding 5% of the SFD's capital, and the total value of active loans to any single country cannot exceed 10% of the capital. These limits can be waived by the Council of Ministers upon a joint recommendation from the SFD and NDF boards.

== Leadership ==
- Chairman: Ahmed bin Aqeel Al-Khateeb was appointed Chairman of the Board of Directors. He also serves as Saudi Arabia's Minister of Tourism, Chairman of the Quality of Life Program Committee, and sits on the boards of the Saudi Arabian Military Industries (SAMI) and the National Development Fund.
- Chief Executive Officer: Sultan bin Abdulrahman Al-Marshad has served as CEO since March 2021. He previously held several positions within the fund, including General Manager of the Monitoring and Auditing Department.

== Sectors and Initiatives ==
The SFD's activities are aligned with the UN Sustainable Development Goals and Saudi Arabia's Saudi Vision 2030.

=== Vision 2030 and Climate Action ===
As part of the Saudi Green Initiative, the SFD has supported renewable energy projects in nine Asian and African countries, contributing to the production of 42,000 megawatts of sustainable energy. The fund has also established over 8,800 solar-powered water facilities in 18 African countries, providing water access to 4.5 million people. In 2021 alone, the SFD financed 15 renewable energy projects worth $650.6 million, nine afforestation and flood protection projects totaling $163.6 million, and eleven agricultural land reclamation projects worth $473 million.

=== Health Sector and COVID-19 Response ===
The SFD's total financing in the health sector exceeds $1.85 billion, representing 8.94% of its total support across 75 projects globally. Notable projects include the King Faisal Hospital in Rwanda, which performed the country's first kidney transplant, and a 220-bed Heart Institute in Uganda serving over 62,000 people annually.

In response to the COVID-19 pandemic, the SFD made a $39 million multiyear contribution to The Global Fund to Fight AIDS, Tuberculosis and Malaria, making Saudi Arabia the 19th largest donor. It also contributed $50 million to the global Pandemic Fund for future pandemic preparedness and provided $1 billion in 2021 to support the recovery of African countries from the pandemic.

=== Humanitarian and Disaster Relief ===
In 2023, the SFD announced an allocation of $800 million for projects in Least Developed Countries. That same year, it provided over $580 million in development loans to 12 African countries for projects in healthcare, education, and infrastructure. The fund also supports natural disaster recovery, such as a $50 million loan to St. Vincent and the Grenadines for infrastructure resilience following volcanic activity.

=== Recent Projects (2024) ===
Throughout 2024, the SFD continued to expand its operations globally:

- Serbia: Marked its entry into the country with three loan agreements valued at $205 million for agriculture, education, and energy.
- Pakistan: Invested $101 million for the Shounter and Jagran-IV Hydropower Projects.
- Turkey: Provided a $55 million loan to support the education sector.
- Benin: Signed a $5 million grant for a water project.

== Partnerships ==
The SFD collaborates with numerous multilateral and bilateral partners. In 2023, it signed a Memorandum of Understanding with the Africa Finance Corporation (AFC) to co-finance infrastructure projects across Africa.

The fund works closely with United Nations agencies, including the United Nations Development Programme (UNDP) on climate initiatives, as well as UNHCR, UNRWA, UNICEF, and the World Health Organization (WHO) on various humanitarian programs. Other partners include the World Bank, Islamic Development Bank, OPEC Fund for International Development, Agence française de développement (AFD), and the Japan International Cooperation Agency (JICA).
