= Saudi Export Development Authority =

Government department in Saudi Arabia

Saudi Export Development Authority (SEDA)
- هيئة تنمية الصادرات السعودية

Agency overview
- Formed: June 2013
- Jurisdiction: Government of Saudi Arabia
- Headquarters: Arcade Center, King Fahd Road, al-Olaya, Riyadh 11578, Saudi Arabia
- Ministers responsible: Bandar bin Ibrahim Al-Khorayef, Minister of Industry and Mineral Resources; Abdulrahman Al-Thukair, CEO
- Parent department: Ministry of Industry and Mineral Resources
- Website: www.saudiexports.gov.sa/en

Saudi Export Development Authority (SEDA) (Arabic: هيئة تنمية الصادرات السعودية), simply shortened to Saudi Exports, is an organ of the Ministry of Industry and Mineral Resources in Saudi Arabia that is responsible for developing the country's export industry in the non-oil sector. It was established in June 2013 and is the official representative of the Made in Saudi initiative.

== Objectives ==
The "strategic themes" of the organization are:

- Facilitate the end-to-end exporters' journey by strengthening the overall export environment.
- Uplift exporters capabilities and readiness to global challenges and enhance their competitiveness in the marketplace.
- Elevate the image and brand of KSA's exports to boost their positioning on global markets.
- Identify, create and promote international business opportunities, connecting exporters and buyers.
- Drive a culture of institutional excellence, collaboration and customer centricity and push digitization to enable the provision of best-in-class, innovative services.
