= Al Ma'dhar Palace =

Historic palace in Riyadh, Saudi Arabia

- قصر المعذر
- Alternative names: King Faisal Palace

General information
- Location: Riyadh, Saudi Arabia
- Opened: 22 May 1952; 73 years ago
- Client: Faisal bin Abdulaziz

Al-Ma'dhar Palace (Arabic: قصر المعذر), also known as King Faisal Palace (Arabic: قصر الملك فيصل), is a historic palace in the al-Ma'dhar neighborhood of Riyadh, Saudi Arabia, located within the precincts of Alfaisal University. Built in 1952 by Prince Faisal bin Abdulaziz, the palace has received several foreign dignitaries and head of state around the 1970s besides being a witness to various matters involving Saudi Arabia at bilateral and regional levels such as the al-Wadiah War of 1969 and the 1973 Arab-Israeli War. In 2024, the Saudi government approved plans to transform the palace into a museum.

== Overview ==
The palace was built in 1952 by Prince Faisal bin Abdulaziz and was one of the earliest palaces inaugurated following the dismantling of the city walls. The inauguration was attended by King Abdulaziz ibn Saud and served as one of the residences of Prince Faisal. The construction of the palace costed around 10 million Saudi riyals at the time.

King Faisal received the delegation of Sudanese president Gaafar Nimeiry in the palace in 1972. In 1973, Egyptian president Anwar Sadat held a meeting with King Faisal bin Abdulaziz in the palace to discuss matters pertaining to the Yom Kippur War. Following the assassination of King Faisal in 1975, the palace was used by his successor, King Khalid bin Abdulaziz. In 1976, he hosted Egyptian president Anwar Sadat in the palace compound. In 1980, he received South Korean president Choi Kyu-hah in the palace.

In 2002, the Alfaisal University was established by the King Faisal Foundation surrounding the palace compound. In 2017, an exhibition was held in the palace compound by Prince Khalid al-Faisal. In 2019, French luxury goods conglomerate Cartier International SNC organized an event to showcase its products.

In 2024, King Salman bin Abdulaziz approved plans to transform the palace into a museum and a tourist attraction that would be known as al-Faisal Museum.
