= Haifa al-Mogrin =

Saudi Arabian economist and politician

- هيفاء بنت عبد العزيز آل مقرن
- Citizenship: Saudi Arabia
- Education: King Saud University; SOAS
- Occupations: Economist; politician
- Known for: Saudi Arabia’s ambassador to Spain; Saudi Arabia's permanent delegate to UNESCO
- Honours: Order of King Abdulaziz

Haifa bint Abdulaziz bin Muhammad bin Abdulaziz bin Ayyaf Al-Mogrin (Arabic: هيفاء بنت عبد العزيز آل مقرن) is a Saudi royal, an economist and politician, who is Saudi Arabia’s permanent representative to the United Nations Educational, Scientific and Cultural Organization, in addition to being the Saudi ambassador to Spain.

== Education ==
Al-Mogrin graduated from King Saud University in 2000 with a BA in Economics. In 2007 she graduated from SOAS with an MA in Economics.

== Career ==
In 2009, she began a part-time lectureship in the Department of Economics at King Saud University, before moving jobs to work on the United Nations Development Programme (UNDP). In 2013 she became a program analyst for the UNDP. In 2016, the Ministry of Economy & Planning employed Al-Mogrin as Head of Sustainable Development Goals. In 2017 she was promoted to Deputy Minister for Sustainable Development. In 2018, she moved roles to Assistant Deputy Minister for G20 Affairs. In 2020, she chaired the G20 Development Working Group.

In January 2020, Al-Mogrin was appointed as Saudi Arabia’s permanent representative to the United Nations Educational, Scientific and Cultural Organization (UNESCO). At her appointment she presented her credentials to Director-General of UNESCO, Audrey Azoulay. Her appointment marked a new achievement for woman from Saudi Arabia. A key part of her role is the promotion of the Arabic language within UNESCO's cultural heritage frameworks. She has also been instrumental in the adoption of al Sadu by UNESCO as part of Saudi Arabia's intangible cultural heritage. In 2020, she was described by Emirates Woman, as "one of the most powerful people in Saudi Arabia".

In January 2023, she was appointed as Saudi Arabia's ambassador to the Kingdom of Spain.

== Awards ==
In 2021, Al-Mogrin was awarded the Order of King Abdulaziz.
