= Saleh Abdullah Kamel =

Saudi businessman (1941–2020)

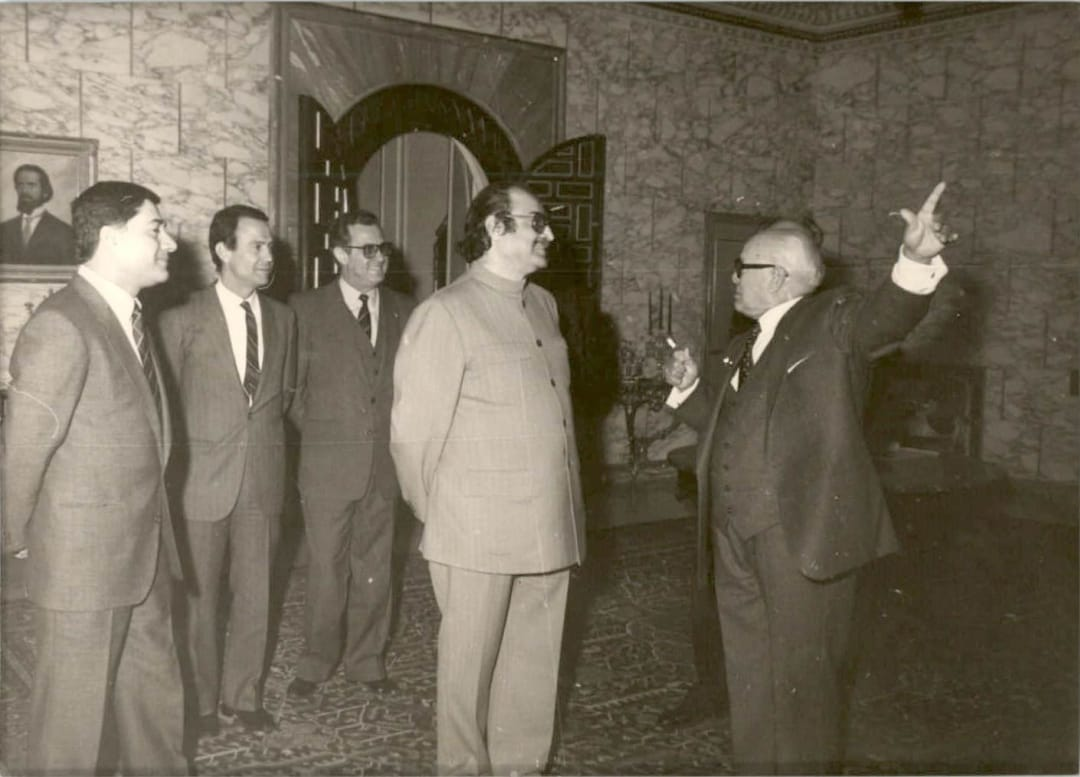
- Moncef Cheikh-Rouhou, Zakaria Ben Moustapha, Sheikh Salah Abdullah Kamel, Habib Bourguiba
- Born: 1941; Mecca, Saudi Arabia
- Died: 18 May 2020 (aged 78–79); Jeddah, Saudi Arabia
- Education: King Saud University
- Occupation: Businessman
- Known for: Chairman and founder, Dallah al Baraka Group
- Spouse(s): Safaa Abu Al Saud, Maydah Nazer
- Children: 9

Saleh Abdullah Kamel (Note: Alternatively transliterated as Salih Abdullah Kamil) (1941 – 18 May 2020) (Arabic: صالح عبد الله كامل Ṣaleḥ 'Abdullāh Kamel) was a Saudi billionaire businessman. He had a net worth estimated at US$2.3 billion, as of March 2017. He was the chairman and founder of the Dallah al Baraka Group (DBHC), one of the Middle East's largest conglomerates. He was also the chairman of the General Council for Islamic Banks and the Jeddah Chamber of Commerce.

He was arrested by the Saudi authorities on 4 November 2017, among other businessmen such as Al-Waleed bin Talal.

== Early life ==
Kamel was born in Mecca, Saudi Arabia in 1941. He was educated in Mecca, Taif, and Jeddah. He earned a bachelor’s degree in commerce from the University of Riyadh in 1963.

== Wealth ==
As of March 2017, Forbes estimated his net worth at US$2.3 billion. In 2018, he was removed from its list of billionaires, as it was no longer clear what assets he owned. Saleh Kamel was the founder and chairman of Dallah Albaraka, a multi-national holding company with investments including the financial, banking, healthcare, real estate, manufacturing, transportation, and operations and maintenance sectors.

== Career ==
He was chairman of the Jeddah Chamber of Commerce and Industry, and the Islamic Chamber of Commerce. Kamel was called "the father of contemporary Islamic finance", receiving Malaysia's Royal Award for Islamic Finance in November 2010. He attempted to significantly expand trade among member states of the Organization of Islamic Cooperation countries and to promote Jeddah as a leading international port and hub for global commerce. In his capacity as chairman of DBHC and the JCC, he led numerous projects to promote the Kingdom of Saudi Arabia as a regional economic force. Kamel stated that his vision was to combine the efforts of his DBHC and the Chamber of commerce with ongoing mega-infrastructure projects such as King Abdullah Port, the Economic City, the new railways, and the King Abdullah International Airport to catalyze domestic business across the Kingdom. He was also behind the creation of the Saudi national bus company - Saudi Public Transport Company, a/k/a "SAPTCO". Saptco was created by signing contracts with American transportation companies to manage it, with the money being provided by the Saudi government, and Saleh Kamel acting as the middleman and collecting a percentage of the contracts as a fee. The initial bus fare within cities was one Saudi riyal, by royal degree, but this has been overturned and the fare increased.

Kamel promoted philanthropy. In an interview with Arab News in 2012, Kamel estimated the total value of Islamic zakat in the Kingdom at SR 1 trillion. "Such a huge amount could be used to solve many economic and social problems in the country." He said that people should pay zakat for real estate properties that have been offered for sale. "We Muslims should understand the economic wisdom behind the system if we collect and use zakat properly for it can bring about substantial improvement in our economic conditions. If we had collected zakat from real estate property we would not have faced housing or land problems." He recalled discussing this matter with German Chancellor Angela Merkel. "I can tell you," he said that Islamic economics offers solutions for world problems." Referring to global economic crises he said they would not have occurred if we had implemented an Islamic Hadith by Muhammad which says, "Do not sell what you do not own or possess." In 2010, his son, CEO of DHBC, donated $10 million to Yale University to establish the Abdallah S. Kamel Center for the Study of Islamic Law and Civilization at Yale Law School

In addition to being chairman and member of many boards within his companies and sister companies, Kamel was a member of the boards of trustees and directors in many social, charitable and cultural societies and foundations such as the Arab Thought Foundation, King Abdul Aziz and His Companions Foundation for Gifted, the international academy for info & Media Sciences, Arab Academy for Financial & Banking and the Islamic Solidarity fund. Sheikh Saleh Kamel was also the president of the Islamic Chamber of Commerce & Industry, the General Council for Islamic Banks and Financial Institutions, Jeddah Chamber of Commerce & Industry, Council of Saudi Chambers and Federation of GCC Chambers.

== Arrest ==
On 4 November 2017, Kamel was arrested in Saudi Arabia in a "corruption crackdown" conducted by a new royal anti-corruption committee. It was the first purge organized by Crown Prince Mohammad bin Salman.

== Awards and recognition ==
Kamel has been honored by many medals, titles and prizes including:

- Jordanian Independence Decoration First Order, 1986
- Gulf Business Man Award, Dubai 1993
- International Golden Knight Belt of World Public House, 1995
- Islamic banker Award, IOB 1995
- Banker of the Year, Union of Arab Banks, 1996
- King Abdul Aziz Decoration, First Order, Sept. 2001
- Two Nile decoration, First Class Sudan, Feb. 2001
- Al-Ala Decoration, Leader Class Morocco, Feb. 2001
- Honorary Doctorate Degree (Media), U.S. Jan. 2003
- Honorary Title of "Datuk Seri", Malaysia, Sept, 2003

=== Resorts ===
Kamel was the owner of Durrat Al-Arus, a resort in Jeddah, Saudi Arabia.

=== Coded TV channels ===
He owned the ART TV network, the only sports channels that broadcast the 2002 and 2006 FIFA world cups in the Middle East. In 2009 these sports channels were bought by the Al Jazeera Group.

=== Civil services ===
Kamel moderated many plans of the City Hall, such as garbage collecting and plans for traffic police, such as driving licenses tests, water desalination plant work and roads building. His companies were also contracted to maintain the region's pilgrimage sites and Holy Mosques of Mecca and Medina.

== Allegations ==
Dallah al Baraka Group, property of al Baraka Banking and Investment Group chaired by Kamel, was named in a lawsuit put forward by families of victims of the 9/11 attacks. The plaintiffs alleged that subsidiaries of the group were involved in illicit finance that aided extremists. Ultimately, all claims were subsequently dismissed in entirety by the U.S. District Court of Southern New York in 2005. Despite controversy surrounding his philanthropic work, the District Court ruled that Kamel had never knowingly abetted any extremist entities. Kamel has consistently stated that his company and philanthropic work remain committed to fostering dialogue and inter-religious understanding.

== Personal life ==
Kamel was married to Egyptian actress Safaa Abu Al Saud, and they had one daughter. He had a son Abdullah with another wife, and he was the chairman the board of the Arab Radio and Television Network. He lived in Jeddah, Saudi Arabia.

Kamel died on 18 May 2020, aged 79.

== Sources ==
- Mustafa Hamid; Leah Farrall (2015). The Arabs at War in Afghanistan. Oxford University Press. p. 189. ISBN 9781849045940.
