= King Saud University =

Public university in Riyadh, Saudi Arabia

- جامعة الملك سعود
- Former names: Riyadh University (1964–1982)
- Motto: ريادة وتميز
- Motto in English: Leadership and Excellence
- Type: Public university
- Established: 6 November 1957; 68 years ago
- Founder: Saud bin Abdulaziz
- Endowment: US$2.7 billion (2013)
- President: Ali M. Masmali
- Administrative staff: 4,952
- Students: 61,412 (2022)
- Location: Riyadh, Saudi Arabia; 24.722°N 46.627°E
- Campus: 2,224 acres (900 ha); Urban
- Language: English, Arabic
- Website: ksu.edu.sa

King Saud University (KSU, Arabic: جامعة الملك سعود, romanized: Jāmiʿa al-Malik Saʿūd) is a public university in Riyadh, Saudi Arabia. Established in 1957 by King Saud bin Abdulalziz to address the country's skilled worker shortage, it is the first university in Saudi Arabia. It was known as Riyadh University from 1964 until it was reverted to its inceptive name in 1982. It was converted into an independent non-profit academic institution in 2023.

The student body of KSU today consists of 40,000 students, 7% of which are international. Female students have their own disciplinary panel, and there is a center supervising the progress of female students, either personally by female faculty members or by male faculty members via a closed television network. The university offers courses in the natural sciences, the humanities, and professional studies, and many courses are tuition-free. The medium of instruction in undergraduate programs is English and Arabic depending on the chosen major.

== History ==
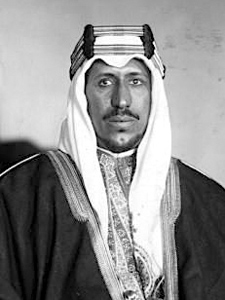
King Saud bin Abdulaziz prior to his ascension to the throne, 1952

Establishing Saudi Arabia's first university was a response to the educational and professional needs of a young nation. King Abdulaziz became king in 1932, and began laying the foundations for modernizing his country and establishing an educational system. In 1953 King Saud, the eldest son of Abdulaziz, acceded to the throne upon his father's death, and instituted the Council of Ministers and the Ministry Education.

Prince Fahd, who eventually became the Saudi king, was the first minister of education. Following the first session of the Council of Ministers, he announced that the first Saudi university would be established as a house of culture and sciences. Prince Fahd said that he was committed to promoting higher education.

In 1957, according to the dictates of the Royal Decree No. 17, Prince Fahd announced the founding of King Saud University, established to "Disseminate and promote knowledge in Our Kingdom for widening the base of scientific and literary study, and for keeping abreast with other nations in the arts and sciences and for contributing with them discovery and invention, in addition to reviving Islamic civilization and articulate its benefits and glories, along with its ambitions to nurture the young virtuously and to guarantee their healthy minds and ethics."

Students began studying at the College of Arts in the 1957–58 academic year. Since then KSU developed further according to the needs of the nation.

Between 1958 and 1960 the College of Sciences, the College of Business (now the College of Public Administration) and the College of Pharmacy were established.

Royal Decree no. 112 of 1961 recognized that King Saud University was an independent legal entity, with a budget of its own, responsible for higher education, promoting scholarly research, and advancement of sciences and arts in the country. Naming the minister of education as the president of the university, the statute ordered that the university have a vice president and secretary general, and that each college and institute have a dean, vice dean, and a council.

In 1965 the College of Agriculture was established and KSU assumed control over the Colleges of Engineering and Education, formerly under the Ministry of Education in cooperation with UNESCO.

=== Riyadh University ===
Royal Decree no. M/11 of 1967 enforced the Statute of the University of Riyadh (currently King Saud University), rescinding all earlier statutes, bylaws, and regulations. Of the main landmarks of the new statute is the creation of the Higher Council of the university as one of its administrative powers. The membership of the new council includes two active or inactive university presidents, two faculty members who had assumed such positions outside the country, or two native leading intellectuals.

The Higher Council of the university is the dominant power over the university affairs: it draws out policies, issues decisions to implement and achieve the objectives of the university (especially those pertaining to the creation of new colleges and departments), proposes budgets, and systems of faculty salaries, annuities, and financial awards.

Royal Decree no M/6 of 1972 superseded the statute of 1967. With the new statute, the membership of the Higher Council of the university includes five active or inactive university presidents, or native leading intellectuals. To the council are also added the university secretary general and two other non-university members. Again, the statute dictates the creation of an Academic Council overlooking scholarly research and studies. The Higher Council of the university issues the bylaws governing the number of the Academic Council's members, responsibilities, and powers.

These decrees were issued in response to the growing and widening needs of the university as the establishment of new colleges started. Between 1958 and 1960, three colleges were established: the College of Sciences, College of Business (now the College of Public Administration) and the College of Pharmacy. In 1961/1962 women were first admitted into the College of Arts and the College of Public Administration.

Five years later the College of Agriculture was established. In the same year the College of Engineering and College of Education, having been under the Ministry of Education in cooperation with the UNESCO, were annexed to the university. A year later (1969/1970) the College of Medicine opened. In 1974/1975 the Arabic Language Institute was inaugurated to serve non-Arabic speakers. At this time deanships of Admission and Registration, Students Affairs, Libraries were also established. Again, a year later (1976) the College of Dentistry and the College of Applied Medical Sciences were added to the Riyadh campus, while launching at the same time the Abha-based campus with the College of Education. In 1977, the Graduate College assumed its office in supervising and organizing all graduate programs in the various departments of the university.

At Abha, the College of Medicine was established according to Royal Order no. 3/M/380 of 1979 and was added to the university according to Royal Directive no. 15128 of 29 June 1400H. Formal study there started in the academic year of 1980/1981.

In 1980 another branch of the university opened at Qassim with three colleges: Agriculture, Veterinary Medicine, and Economics and Administration. Formal study started in 1980/1981 academic year.

=== King Saud University ===
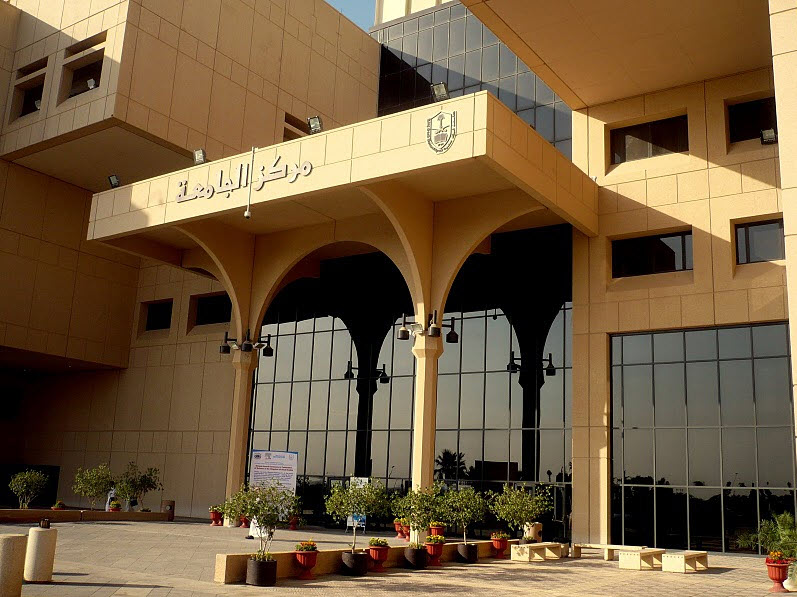
King Saud University entrance

In 1982, celebrating its 25th anniversary, the University of Riyadh went back to its original name of King Saud University at the orders of King Khalid bin Abdulaziz. In that year, too, the Deanship of Community Service and Continuing Education replaced the Center for Community Service, and King Khalid University Hospital (KKUH) was formally opened.

Two years later (1983) two other colleges were created: the College of Computer and Information Science Sciences and the College of Architecture and Planning. Later, in 1990, the Institute of Languages and Translation was established to be turned four years later into the full-fledged College of Languages and Translation.

In 1993, the royal ratification of the System of the Council of Higher Education and Universities was issued dictating that each university form its own council which attends to its academic, administrative, and financial affairs, and carries out its general policy.

In 1996, the Council of Higher Education issued its decision no. 1282/A approving the creation of the Center for Consulting and Research which was renamed King Abdullah Center for Consulting and Research.

In 1997, Royal Decree no. 33 dictated the creation of a King Saud University Community College in Jazan, as well as the establishment of the College of Sciences at the Qassim campus.

In 1998, Royal Order no. 7/78/M of 11 March 1419 decreed that King Khalid University be created in the south. The branches of Imam University and of King Saud University consequently formed the new university. In the same year, after the issuance of the unified regulations for Graduate Studies at Saudi universities, the Graduate College became the Deanship of Graduate Studies, and the Deanship of Academic Research was established in accordance with the dictates of the System of Academic Research issued that year.

In 2000, the College of Medicine was established at the Qassim campus, and the Deanship of Community Service and Continuing Education was turned into the College of Applied Studies and Community Service.

In 2001, the Community College in Riyadh was inaugurated according to the Cabinet Council no. 73. During the academic year of 2002/2003 the College of Science at Al-Jouf was established. That same year the College of Engineering was opened at the Qassim campus, and the creation of community colleges at Al-Majma'ah, Al-Aflaj, and Al-Qurayat was approved.

Beginning with the academic year 2003/2004 the Qassim campus became an independent university. In 2003, the Council of Higher Education approved the promotion of the Department of Nursing, College of Applied Medical Sciences, into the College of Nursing.

=== Former rectors ===
The following individuals have served as the rectors of the university since its inception:

Rectors	From	Up to
Abdulwahab Mohammed Azzam	1957	1959
Sheikh Nasser Al Manqour	1959	1960
Abdulaziz bin Muhammad Al Khwaiter	1961	1971
Abdulaziz bin Abdullah Al Fadda	1971	1979
Mansour bin Ibrahim Al Turki	1979	1990
Ahmad bin Muhammad Al Dhubaib	1990	1995
Abdullah bin Muhammad Al Faisal	1995	2007
Abdullah Al Othman	2007	2012
Badran Al Omar	2012	2024
Abdullah Al-Salman	2024	2025
Ali bin Mohammed Mosmily	2025	present

== Campus ==
The school's current main campus was designed by HOK Architects, headquartered in St. Louis, Missouri. Mechanical and Electrical systems were designed by Syska Hennessy Group, Inc. New York City, New York. The facility was constructed in the 1980s by Blount International, a construction firm led by Winton M. Blount headquartered in Montgomery, Alabama, after the firm was awarded the world's then-largest fixed-price contract in history for the sum of approximately $5 billion.

=== Libraries ===
The King Salman Central library is housed in a seven-floor building, with an area of 51,400 square metres (553,000 sq ft) and more than 4,000 seats, has collections of books, periodicals, manuscripts, government publications, academic theses, dissertations, press clippings, audio-visual and electronic media.

=== King Khalid University Hospital ===
In 1982, a dedicated university hospital was opened and was named King Khalid University Hospital. This facility is an 850-bed facility with all general and subspecialty medical services. It contains a special outpatient building, more than 20 operating rooms, and a fully equipped and staffed laboratory, radiology, and pharmacy services in addition to all other supporting services.

The hospital provides primary and secondary care services for Saudi patients from Northern Riyadh area. It also provides tertiary care services to all Saudi citizens on referral bases. All care is free of charge for all King Saud University staff and students.

=== The Palm Mosque (Jama'a Al-Naqheel) ===
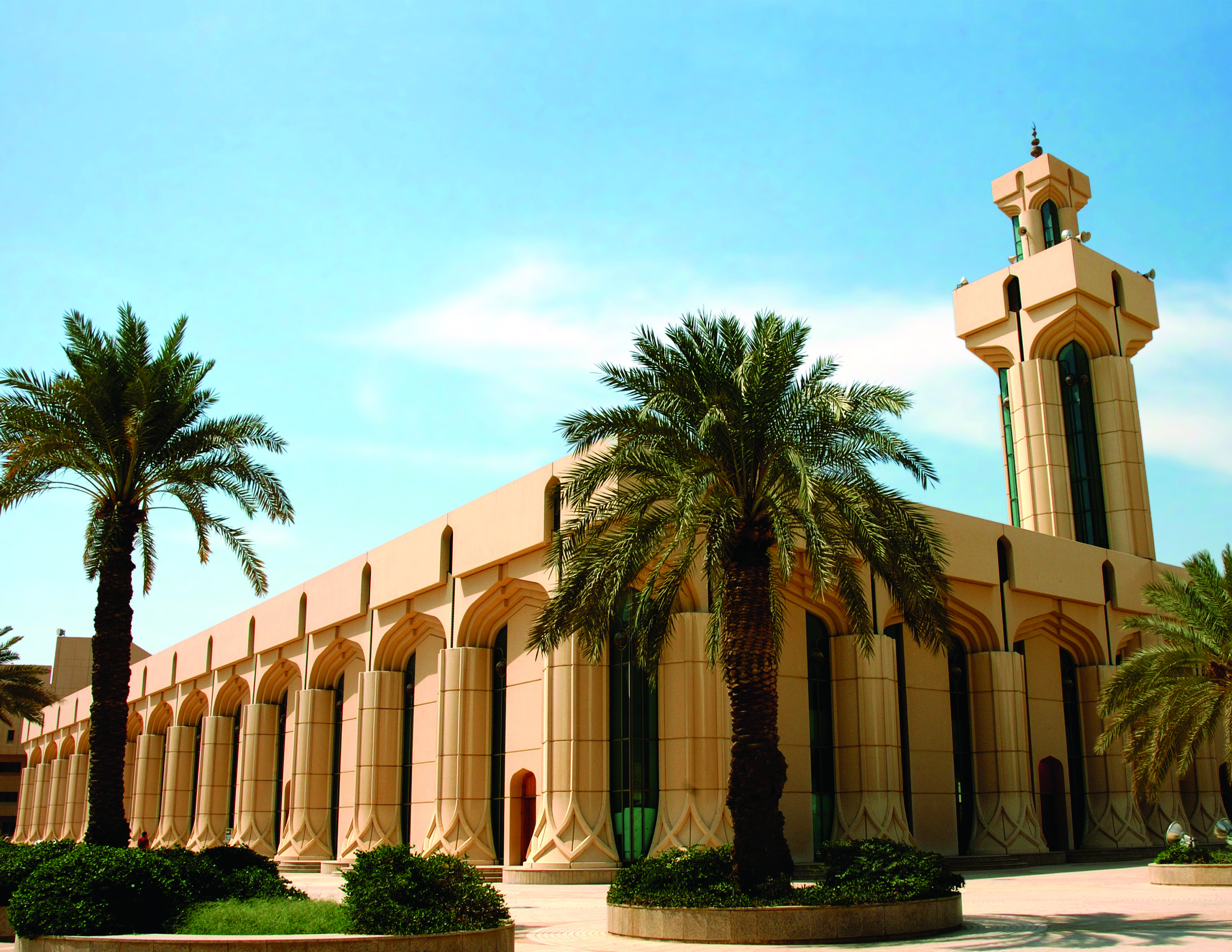
The Palm Mosque, (Jama'a Al-Nakheel)

In 1982, Dr. Basil Al Bayati won the 1st prize in the King Saud Competition to build the main mosque for the university. His design incorporated extensively the motif of the palm trunk, as used in the very first Mosque of the Prophet in Medina. It was highly praised and was even claimed to "mark the beginning of a new era, a new revival in Islamic architecture." The interior calligraphy above the doors and in the mihrab was done by Ghani Alani, the last of the Baghdad School of Calligraphy. He was a student of Hashem al-Khattat. Ghani Alani taught Dr. Bayati whilst at the College of Engineering in Baghdad. The building was also nominated for the 1992 Aga Khan Award for Architecture.

=== University Entrance Gate (Faith & Knowledge) ===
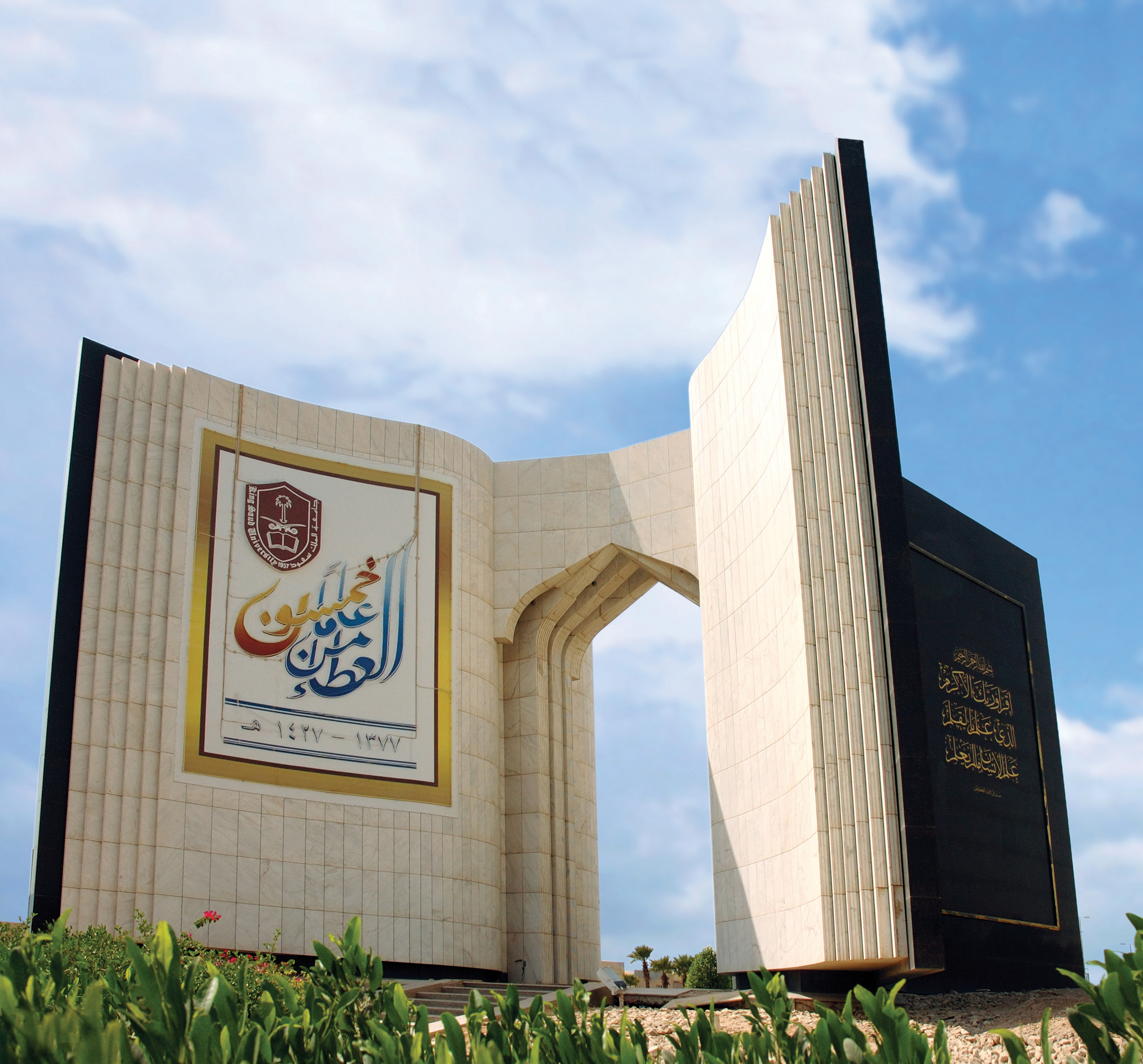
King Saud University Entrance Gate by Basil Al Bayati

As well as designing the mosque, Basil Al Bayati also designed the entrance gates to the university which are based upon the theme of faith and knowledge; two pillars of Islam that must be taken together, "Knowledge cannot do without faith nor can faith ignore knowledge for Islam calls always for faith and knowledge to run in parallel." "The design consists of two books representing knowledge and faith. They have been so placed so that their pages are interlocked thus showing the close connection between faith and knowledge. Verses from the Quran on faith and knowledge are written in script on the cover of each book."

== Academics ==
University rankings

Global – Overall
- ARWU World: 101–150 (2022)
- CWTS World: 111 (2023)
- QS World: 143 (2026)
- THE World: 401–500 (2024)
- USNWR Global: 213 (2023)

Regional – Overall
- QS Arab region: 4 (2024)
- THE Arab Countries: 7 (2022)
- THE Asia: 38 (2023)
- USNWR Asia: 32 (2023)

The university offers a broad range of undergraduate courses in the natural sciences, the social sciences, the humanities and professional studies. Tuition is completely free and generous scholarships are available for Saudi and international students. The medium of instruction in undergraduate programs is English and Arabic. Applicants are required to pass an Arabic examination if they are from a non-Arabic speaking country. English-language support at all levels is provided by the Languages Unit.

== Colleges ==
- Preparatory Year Program

Science Colleges

- College of Architecture and Planning
- College of Business Administration
- College of Engineering
- College of Science
- College of Foods And Agriculture
- College of Computer and Information Sciences

Health Colleges

College of Medicine

- College of Medicine
- College of Dentistry
- College of Pharmacy
- College of Applied Medical Sciences
- College of Nursing
- College of Prince Sultan for Emergency Medical Services

Humanities Colleges

- College of Arts
- College of Education
- College of Law and Political Science
- College of Languages and Translation
- College of Tourism & Archaeology
- Arabic Language Institute
- College of Teaching
- College of Physical Education & Sports

Community Colleges

- College of Applied Studies and Community Service
- Community College in Riyadh

=== College of Science ===
The College of Science was established in 1958, and offers the following bachelor's degrees:

- Statistics
- Operations Research
- Geology
- Geophysics
- Chemistry
- Biochemistry
- Zoology
- Botany
- Microbiology
- Mathematics
- Financial Mathematics
- Physics

=== College of Business Administration ===
This college was established in 1959 and got the Association to Advance Collegiate Schools of Business (AACSB), and it comprises nine departments:

- Accounting
- Economics
- Finance
- Health Administration
- Management
- Management Information Systems
- Marketing
- Public Administration
- Quantitative Analysis.

=== College of Engineering ===
The college of Engineering was established as a joint project between the Saudi Ministry of Education and UNESCO in November 1962. This project lasted until 1969 when the college became an official part of King Saud University. The college now has seven departments:

- Petroleum Engineering (established in 1974)
- Chemical Engineering (established in 1974)
- Surveying Engineering (established in 1988)
- Civil Engineering (established in 1962)
- Industrial Engineering (established in 2002)
- Mechanical Engineering (established in 1962)
- Electrical Engineering (established in 1962)

The number of students of the college rose from 17 in 1962 to more than 4000 students in 2005. The Faculty members have grown from 4 to 210 (including lecturers and teaching assistants) in the same time span.

=== College of Architecture and Planning ===
This college was initially established as a department in the College of Engineering in 1968. It was extended as a college in 1984 to include the department of "Urban Planning".

=== College of Pharmacy ===
The College of Pharmacy was established in 1959, with a stated mission of "high-quality instruction and research" and currently has numerous teaching and research centers. There are five academic departments: Medicinal Chemistry, Pharmacology and Toxicology, Pharmaceutics, Pharmacognosy and Clinical Pharmacy. The college offers a Doctor of Pharmacy (Pharm.D) program as a six-year program undergraduate entry-level program with a final year of internship. The college also offers many graduate programs Masters (MSc) and Doctor of Philosophy (PhD), along with many postgraduate programs including Residencies and Fellowships.

== Discoveries and innovation ==
=== Innovation Initiatives ===
- King Abdullah Institute for Nanotechnology.
- Riyadh Techno Valley Program

== Notable alumni ==
- Abdulaziz bin Saud Al Saud, Interior Minister
- Abdulaziz bin Turki Al Saud, Sports Minister
- Abdullah bin Bandar Al Saud, Minister of the National Guard
- Abdulrahman Al-Fadhli, Minister of Environment, Water and Agriculture
- Ahmed Al Khateeb, Tourism Minister
- Badr bin Abdullah Al Saud, Culture Minister
- Bandar Alkhorayef, Minister of Industry and Mineral Resources
- Fahad Al-Jalajel, Health Minister
- Faisal bin Farhan Al Saud, Minister of Foreign Affairs
- Habib Rizieq Former FPI leader, Islamic organization in Indonesia
- Hafiz Saeed, Pakistani Islamist militant
- Haifa al-Mogrin, Saudi permanent representative to UNESCO
- Rania Nashar, businesswoman
- Hamad bin Mohammed Al Al-Sheikh, Education Minister
- Ibrahim Abdulaziz Al-Assaf, Former Finance and Foreign Minister
- Mohammad bin Salman, Crown Prince and Prime Minister of Saudi Arabia
- Saleh Abdullah Kamel, Founder and Chairman of Dallah Al-Baraka
- Saleh bin Nasser Al-Jasser, Transport Minister
- Tawfig Al-Rabiah, Minister of Hajj and Umrah

== Notable faculty ==
- Mujahid Kamran, Associate professor at King Saud University from 2001 to 2004
- Nourah al-Qahtani, Professor of Modern Literature and Criticism
- Saad Albazei, Professor of English and Comparative Literature

== See also ==
- List of Islamic educational institutions
- List of things named after Saudi kings
- List of universities in Saudi Arabia
- Prince Sultan Advanced Technology Research Institute
