= Saudi Authority for Industrial Cities and Technology Zones =

Saudi Government authority

Saudi Authority for Industrial Cities and Technology Zones (Modon)
- الهيئة السعودية للمدن الصناعية ومناطق التقنية (مدن)
- Nickname: MODON
- Formation: 12 November 2001; 24 years ago
- Type: Government agency
- Location: Riyadh, Saudi Arabia
- Region served: Saudi Arabia
- CEO: Majed Al-Argoubi
- Website: Official Website

The Saudi Authority for Industrial Cities and Technology Zones (Arabic: الهيئة السعودية للمدن الصناعية ومناطق التقنية), also known simply as MODON (Arabic: مُدُن), is a government agency created by the Government of Saudi Arabia in 2001 through Ministerial Legislation No. 235 dated 27/8/1422H. It is responsible for the regulation and promotion of industrial estates and technology zones in Saudi Arabia and to encourage the private sector to become involved in the development, operation and maintenance of industrial estates.

== Director Generals of MODON ==
Tawfiq Al Rabiah was Director General of MODON from April 2007 to January 2012.

Eng. Saleh Al-Rasheed was Director General of MODON from December 2011 to April 2017.

Eng. Khaled Al-Salem has been Acting Director General since April 2017. Thereafter he was appointed Director General of MODON by a resolution of its board of directors in September 2017.
