= Dallah Al-Baraka =

Multinational holding company based in Jeddah, Saudi Arabia

Dallah Albaraka مجموعة دلة البركة
- Founded: 1969; 57 years ago
- Founder: Saleh Abdullah Kamel
- Headquarters: Jeddah, Saudi Arabia
- Key people: Abeddallah Saleh Kamel, CEO
- Website: http://www.dallah.com

Dallah Al-Baraka Holding Company (DBHC), is a private multinational corporation based in Jeddah, Saudi Arabia. The company has holdings throughout the Middle East, North Africa, the Far East and Europe. The company is best classed as a conglomerate with investments including the financial, banking, healthcare, real estate, manufacturing, transportation, and operations and maintenance sectors.

== Overview ==
Dallah Albaraka Holding Company (DBHC) is a multinational private corporation based in Jeddah, Saudi Arabia. DBHC has a broad-based investment portfolio with holdings throughout the Middle East, North Africa, Far East and Europe. It invests across many industries including financial and banking services, health care, manufacturing, real estate, transportation and operations and maintenance.

== History ==
The company began in 1969 as a courier service with the name Dallah Establishment by Saleh Abdullah Kamal in Riyadh. By 1979 was one of the largest contractors for the Saudi government. DBHC was formed as a holding company in 1984 when Dallah Establishment expanded its activities to include financial and banking services, health care, manufacturing, real estate and tourism, trading, agriculture, operations and maintenance and transportation. As DBHC continued to grow, major subsidiaries were established to manage the investments in key sectors which includes an international network of banks, in addition to investment and insurance vehicles; and general business, which range from hospital operations to cleaning and maintenance to food manufacture and restaurants. Today, DBHC is one of the largest conglomerates in the region, with diversified investments totaling billions of dollars spanning 40 countries.

In 1969, DBHC expanded its investments to create Dallah Works and Maintenance Company in Riyadh. That company, benefiting from contracts with the Saudi government, including the cleaning and maintenance of the Mecca and Medina holy sites, provided the financial launch for increasingly diverse investments. In the mid-1970s, Dallah expanded its investments to include Dallah Avco Trans Arabia Company, which specialized in airport construction, operation, and maintenance. Dallah Avco Arabia attained a large number of airport and related operations in Saudi, such as the 1988 contract to maintain and run the Saudi’s air traffic control system.

In 2012 DBHC, the Islamic Development Bank, and the Qatari government signed a memorandum of understanding to establish an Islamic Bank with $1 billion in capital. The huge Islamic Bank shall provide “liquidity-management solutions in an effort to create an Islamic inter-bank market,” said Ahmad Mohamed Ali Al-Madani, chairman of Jeddah-based IDB. The Doha-based bank had a subscribed capital of $500 million and finances infrastructure projects.

== Philanthropy ==
As part of an effort to build inter-religious harmony and bridge the West and the Islamic world. In 2015, DHBC CEO Kamel donated $10 million to Yale Law School to establish “Abdallah S. Kamel Center for the Study of Islamic Law and Civilization ” in what has become the country’s top center for the study of Islamic law. The center hosts distinguished scholars in the field of Islamic law and civilization who will spend a semester at the Law School to teach courses in their area of expertise. Visiting professors will also offer public lectures and engage with students and faculty at the Law School and Yale University. DBHC is active in publicizing its social engagement activities, to include support for the Islamic economic centers at King Abdulaziz University, King Saud University, Azhar University, Al-Faisal University and Yale University.

== Allegations ==
In 2005 both Kamel and Al Baraka were cleared of allegations that sections of the holding company were involved in illicit financing . Despite controversy surrounding his philanthropic work, Kamel was never charged with knowingly abetting any extremist groups and has consistently stated that his company and philanthropic work remain committed to fostering dialogue and inter-religious understanding. The ruling by Judge Casey of the United States District Court, Southern District New York "dismissed in their entirety" all claims against Al Baraka and Mr. Kamel.

== Major subsidiaries and business units ==
=== Dallah Group ===
Established in 1997, Dallah Group was organized to perform contracts related to the operation and maintenance of airports and mosques, road construction, driving training schools, traffic control and business solutions, among other business lines.

=== Dallah Real Estate and Tourism Company ===
Dallah Real Estate and Tourism Company is a regional real-estate holding company that specializes in real estate advisory, management and development.

=== Al-Samaha Trade Holding Company ===
Al-Samaha Trade Holding Company specializes in trade within local and global markets. Its activities include importation of consumer goods, hoist platforms and servicing contracts to operate e-government services.

=== Al-Jazira Transport Company ===
The Al-Jazira Transport Company focuses on providing transportation services for Pilgrims and Omra visitors. Its activities also include refrigerated transport (a primary hauler for most of the dairy and juice producers in Saudi Arabia) while its fleet comprises more than 400 trucks and trailers in addition to 100 plus towing trucks and trailers for the transportation of dry and liquid materials, over 2,000 vehicles in total.

=== Dallah Telecom Company ===
Dallah Telecom was established in 1990 to modernize telecommunications and information technology in Saudi Arabia and other countries in the region. Since its establishment, Dallah Telecom has implemented high-tech projects for wired and wireless telecommunications on regional and international levels. Dallah Telecom provides digital learning systems to Saudi universities and helps implement long-term education-development strategies. It also cooperates with local and international companies to develop new business opportunities and manage commercial telecommunications projects.

=== TeleInvest Limited ===
TeleInvest Ltd, based on Cayman Islands, focuses and invests in telecommunications companies worldwide.

== Other investments ==
Dallah Albaraka Holding Company holds direct and indirect investments in many private and publicly traded/listed companies including:

- Private Equity:
  - Al-Manakha Urban Project Development Holding Co.
  - Durrat Al-Riyadh Co.
  - Dallah Eastbridge Investment Co.
  - Dallah Media Production Company
  - Dallah for Technology and Alternative Energy
  - Ejada
  - Food Manufacturing Company (ULKER)
  - Makkah Printing and Information Company
  - Maad International Co.
  - Okaz
  - Umm Alqura for Development & Construction
- Publicly Listed Companies:
  - Majority Investments
    - Dallah Health Care Company
    - Al Baraka Banking Group
    - Al-Multaka
    - Aseer Trading, Tourism & Manufacturing Company
    - El-Ismaila Poultry
  - Minority Investments
    - Jabal Omar Development Company
    - Bank Al Jazira
    - Reinvention Media, Ltd.
