= Bibi Duaij Al-Jaber Al-Sabah =

Kuwaiti migration rights activist and curator

Sheikha Bibi Duaij Al-Jaber Al-Sabah
- بيبي دعيج الجابر الصباح
- Citizenship: Kuwait
- Organization: Al Sadu Society

Sheikha Bibi Duaij Al-Jaber Al-Sabah (Arabic: بيبي دعيج الجابر الصباح) is a cultural and education activist known for her efforts to preserve and promote Kuwait's textile heritage. As the chairperson of the AlSadu Society – Weaving Cooperative, she has spent over a decade advocating for the master weavers, ensuring the continuity of craft traditions.

== Early life and education ==
Bibi Duaij AlJaber Al Sabah earned her bachelor's degree in accounting from Kuwait University in 2002. She further pursued her education at Kuwait University, achieving an MBA with a focus on finance, graduating summa cum laude in 2004.

== Career ==
In 2004, Bibi began her career as a faculty member and accounting instructor at Gulf University for Science and Technology. In 2010, she transitioned to her current role as the chairperson of the AlSadu Society – Handcrafts Cooperative. In this capacity, Bibi advocates for the preservation and promotion of weaving crafts through documentation, educational programs, and cultural initiatives.

== Accomplishments and initiatives ==
Under Bibi's leadership, the AlSadu Society achieved accreditation by UNESCO and WIPO. Notably, she spearheaded the establishment of the SADI Studio art residency under the Sadu Art & Design Initiative (SADI), transforming the craft of weaving into an artistic form of expression. Bibi played a pivotal role in the inauguration of AlSadu Street and worked towards accrediting the Sadu Society as a consultative society accredited to UNESCO by the State of Kuwait in 2022. She successfully advocated for the inclusion of the Al-Sadu educational program on UNESCO's list of good safeguarding practices, making it the first Kuwaiti and Arab file to be included in UNESCO in 2022.

== Conferences and Lectures ==
Bibi has been an active participant in international conferences and symposia, contributing insights on the cultural relevance of AlSadu in modern-day life. Noteworthy lectures include presentations at Kuwait University, the International Symposium on Intangible Heritage in Doha, Design Doha Forum, and the Selvedge World Fair in London.

== Studies and Publications ==
Bibi Duaij Al Sabah has made contributions to the field of education and cultural preservation. She participated in the preparation of the national Arts education curriculum for eighth graders, focusing on The Art of Weaving in 2018. Additionally, she co-authored articles and contributed to publications, including "The Desert Environment and the Sadu Craft" in the book "Architectural Features of Cultural Heritage" (2023) and the introduction to the book "Al Dhafra" (2022).

== Achievements and Collaborations ==
She actively cooperated with the United Nations High Commissioner for Refugees on the MADE 51 program, empowering refugees in the field of handicrafts in 2021. Bibi Duaij Jaber AlAli AlSabah continues her role in preserving Kuwait's cultural heritage, promoting education, and fostering innovation in traditional weaving.
