= Bandar Al-Khorayef =

Saudi politician

His Excellency Bandar Al-Khorayef
- بندر الخريف
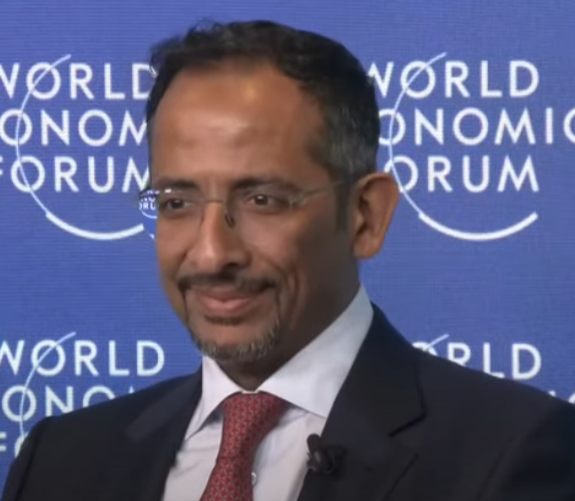
- Al-Khorayef in 2023

Minister of Industry and Mineral Resources
- In office 30 August 2019 – 11 July 2026

Personal details
- Education: King Saud University
- Occupation: Business executive

Bandar bin Ibrahim Al-Khorayef is the Minister of Industry and Mineral Resources in Saudi Arabia. He was appointed on 30 August 2019 to the newly formed industry that was created from the Ministry of Energy. He was replaced on July 2026 by prince Abdulaziz bin Salman.

== Education ==
Alkhorayef holds a Bachelor of Arts in International Agriculture from King Saud University. He also earned several certificates from Switzerland's International Institute for Management Development in Business Administration and International Business.

== Career ==
Alkhorayef is the top executive at Alkhorayef Group, as well as the vice-chairman of the Arabian Agricultural Services Company. In addition, Alkhorayef is a board member at Riyadh Chamber, the Saudi Economic Association, and the Saudi industrial council.
