= List of things named after Saudi kings =

This is a list of things named after kings of Saudi Arabia.

== List ==
=== Abdulaziz ===
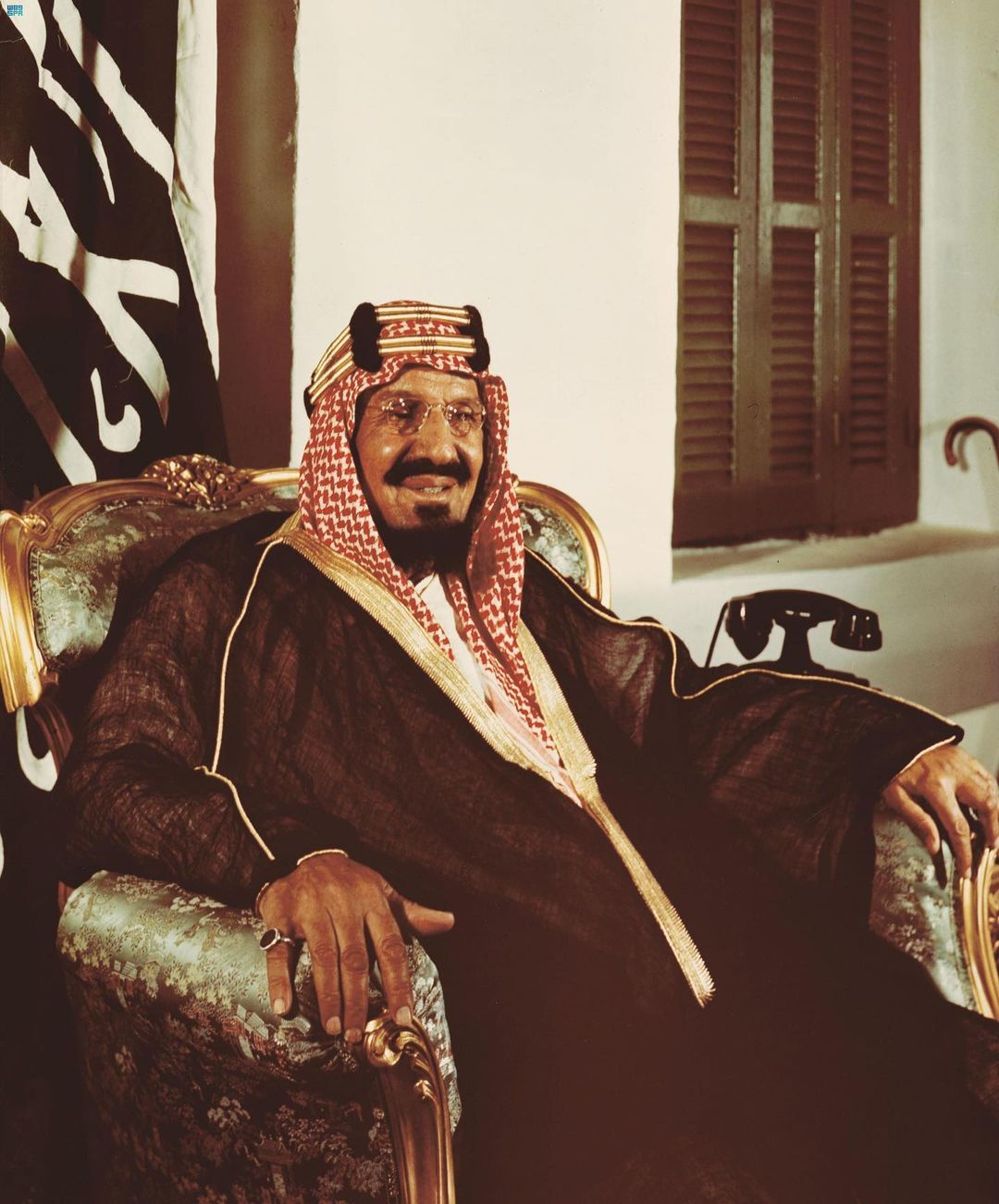
King Abdulaziz

Reign: 23 September 1932 – 9 November 1953

| Location | Name | Type |
|---|---|---|
| Riyadh | King Abdulaziz Center for Cultural Communication | Cultural / Government |
| Riyadh | King Abdulaziz City for Science and Technology | Research |
| Riyadh | King Abdulaziz Historical Center | Cultural |
| Riyadh | King Abdulaziz Public Library | Cultural |
| Riyadh | King Abdulaziz Foundation for Research and Archives | Cultural |
| Riyadh | King Abdulaziz Medical City | Healthcare |
| Riyadh | King Abdulaziz Mosque | Religious |
| Riyadh | King Abdulaziz Racetrack | Sports |
| Riyadh | King Abdulaziz Manakh Park | Urban park |
| Jeddah | King Abdulaziz International Airport | Infrastructure |
| Jeddah | King Abdulaziz Medical City | Healthcare |
| Jeddah | King Abdulaziz University | Education |
| Jeddah | King Abdulaziz University College of Health Sciences | Education |
| Dhahran | King Abdulaziz Air Base | Military |
| Dhahran | King Abdulaziz Center for World Culture | Cultural |
| Mecca | King Abdulaziz Hospital | Healthcare |
| Mecca | King Abdulaziz Complex for Holy Kaaba Kiswa | Religious |
| Mecca | King Abdulaziz Sports City Stadium | Sports |
| Jubail | King Abdulaziz Naval Base | Military |
| Uyayna | King Abdulaziz Military College | Military |
| Dammam | King Abdulaziz Port | Infrastructure |
| Kuwait | King Abdulaziz Road | Infrastructure |
| Marbella | King Abdulaziz Mosque | Religious |
| Casablanca | King Abdul Aziz Foundation for Human Sciences and Islamic Studies | Research |
| Saudi Arabia | Order of King Abdulaziz | Award |

=== Saud ===
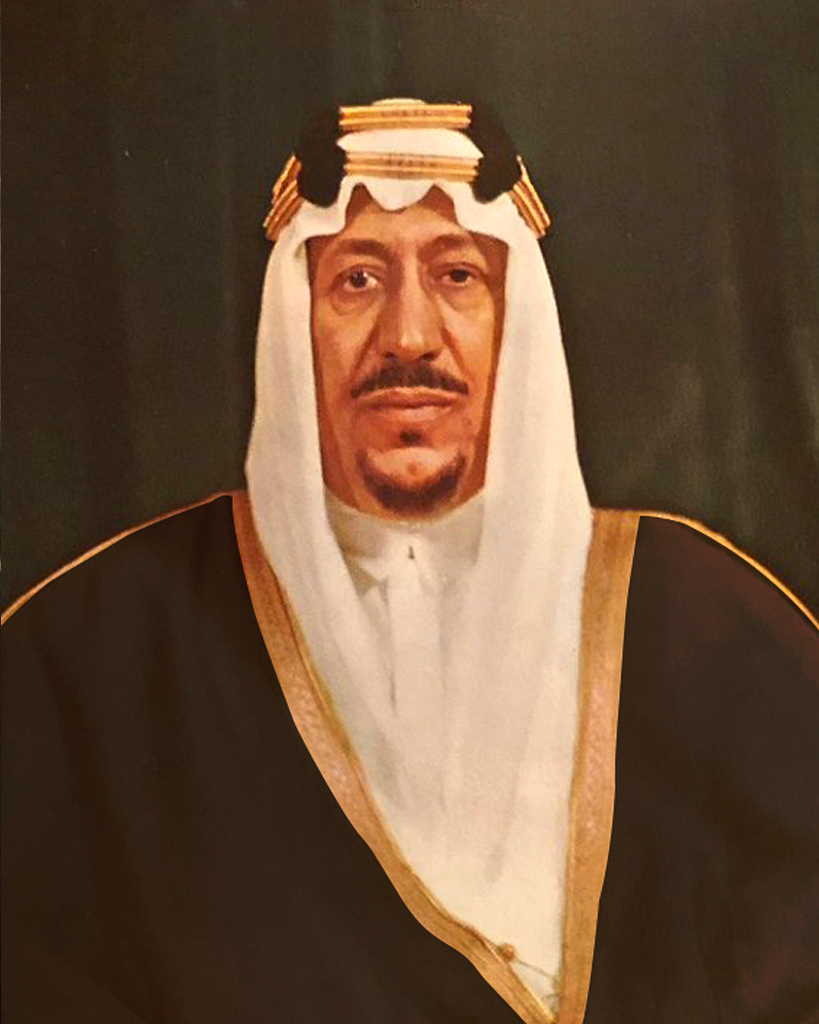
King Saud

Reign: 9 November 1953 – 2 November 1964

| Location | Name | Type |
|---|---|---|
| Riyadh | King Saud University | Education |
| Riyadh | King Saud University College of Medicine | Education |
| Riyadh | King Saud University for Health Sciences | Education |
| Riyadh | King Saud Medical City | Healthcare |
| Unaizah | King Saud Hospital | Healthcare |
| Jeddah | King Saud Mosque | Religious |
| Al-Aqiq | King Saud Domestic Airport | Infrastructure |

=== Faisal ===
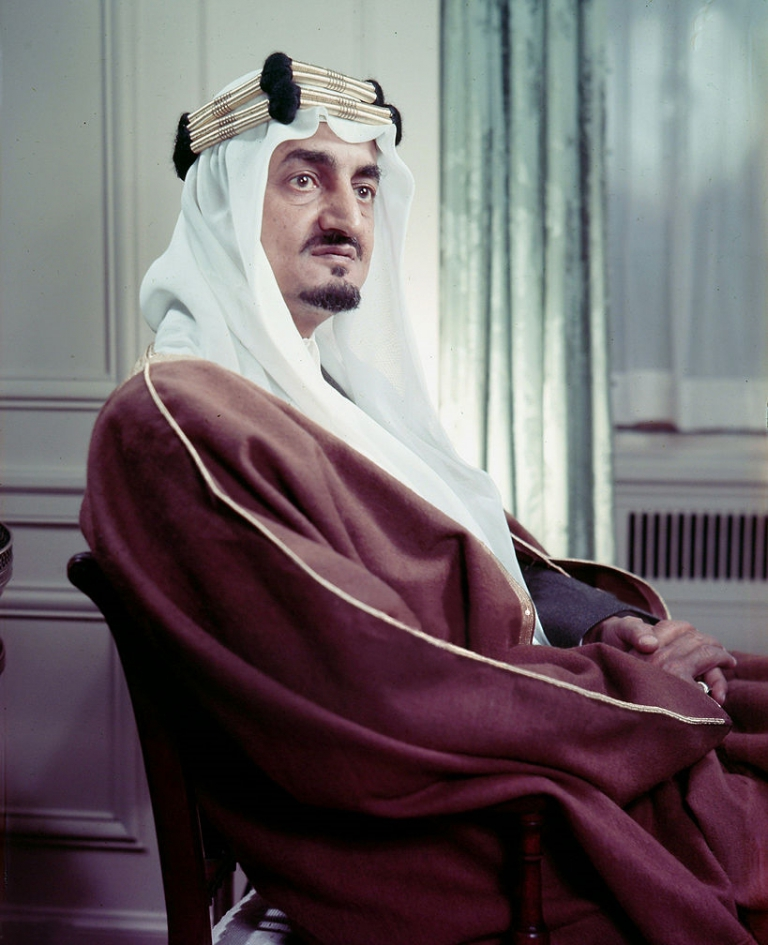
King Faisal

Reign: 2 November 1964 – 25 March 1975

| Location | Name | Type |
|---|---|---|
| Riyadh | King Faisal Air Academy | Military / Education |
| Riyadh | King Faisal Road | Infrastructure |
| Riyadh | King Faisal Specialist Hospital and Research Centre | Healthcare |
| Riyadh | Al-Faisal University | Education |
| Riyadh | King Faisal Foundation | Organization |
| Riyadh | King Faisal Prize | Award |
| Riyadh | Al-Faisaliah Tower | Landmark |
| Jeddah | King Faisal Naval Base | Military |
| Mecca | King Faisal Hospital | Healthcare |
| Mecca | Al-Faisaliah City | Urban development |
| Al-Ahsa | King Faisal University | Education |
| Jizan | King Faisal Sports City Stadium | Sports |
| Tabuk | King Faisal Air Base | Military |
| Sharjah | King Faisal Mosque | Religious |
| Manama | King Faisal Road | Infrastructure |
| Kigali | King Faisal Hospital | Healthcare |
| Pakistan | Faisal Mosque | Religious |
| Pakistan | Faisalabad | City |
| Ghana | King Faisal F.C. | Sports |

=== Khalid ===
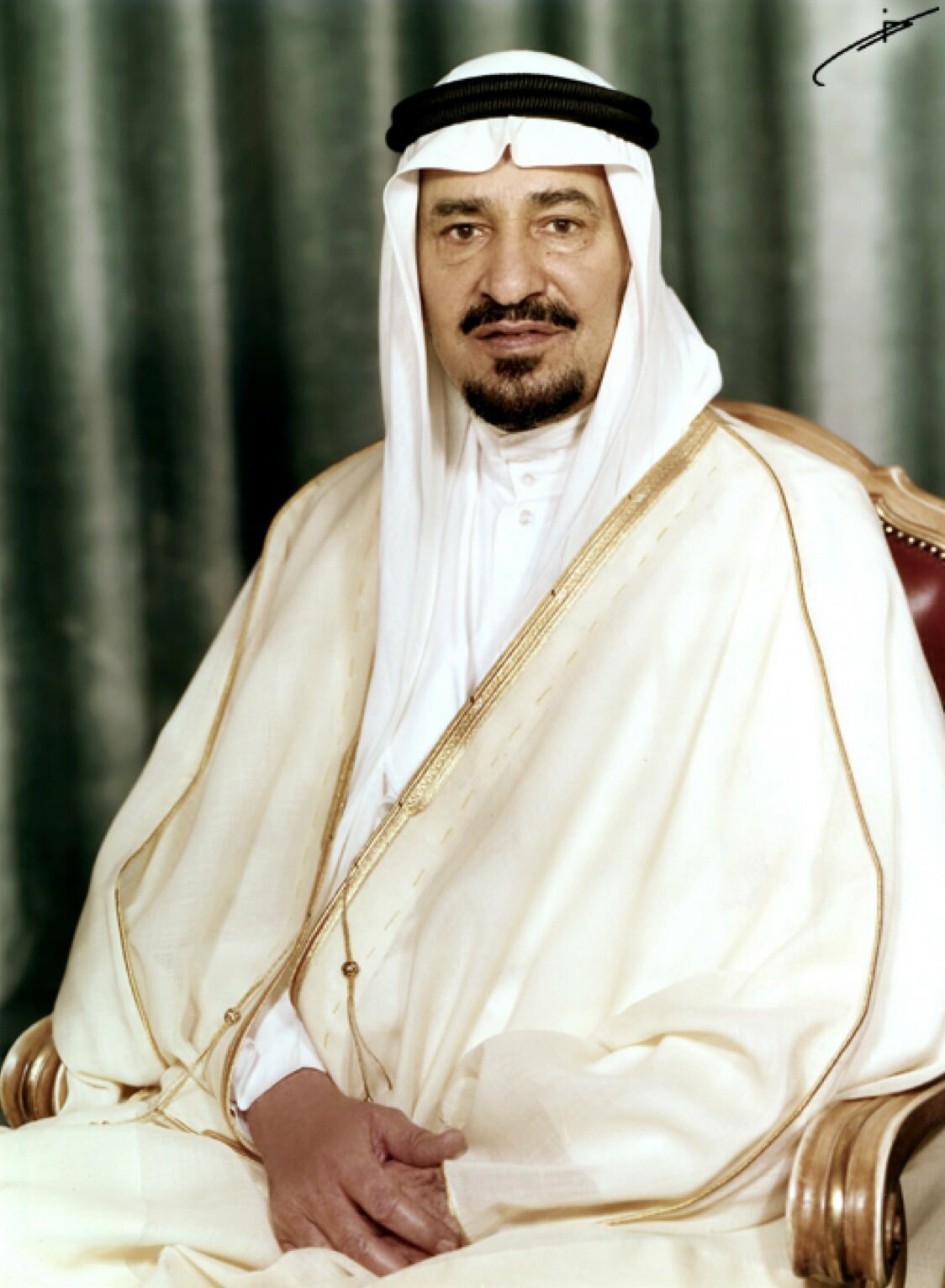
King Khalid

Reign: 25 March 1975 – 13 June 1982

| Location | Name | Type |
|---|---|---|
| Riyadh | King Khalid Eye Specialist Hospital | Healthcare |
| Riyadh | King Khalid Airport Mosque | Religious |
| Riyadh | King Khalid Grand Mosque | Religious |
| Riyadh | King Khalid Foundation | Organization |
| Riyadh | King Khalid International Airport | Infrastructure |
| Riyadh | King Khalid University | Education |
| Riyadh | King Khalid Royal Reserve | Nature reserve |
| Riyadh | King Khalid Wildlife Research Center | Research |
| Hafar al-Batin | King Khalid Military City | Military |
| Hafar al-Batin | King Khaled Military City Airport | Military |
| Khamis Mushait | King Khalid Air Base | Military |
| Abha | King Khalid University Stadium | Sports |
| Dammam | King Khalid Medical City | Healthcare |
| Bujumbura | Kamenge University Hospital | Healthcare |
| Edinburgh | King Khalid Building | Lecture theatre |
| Penang | Al-Malik Khalid Mosque | Religious |

=== Fahd ===
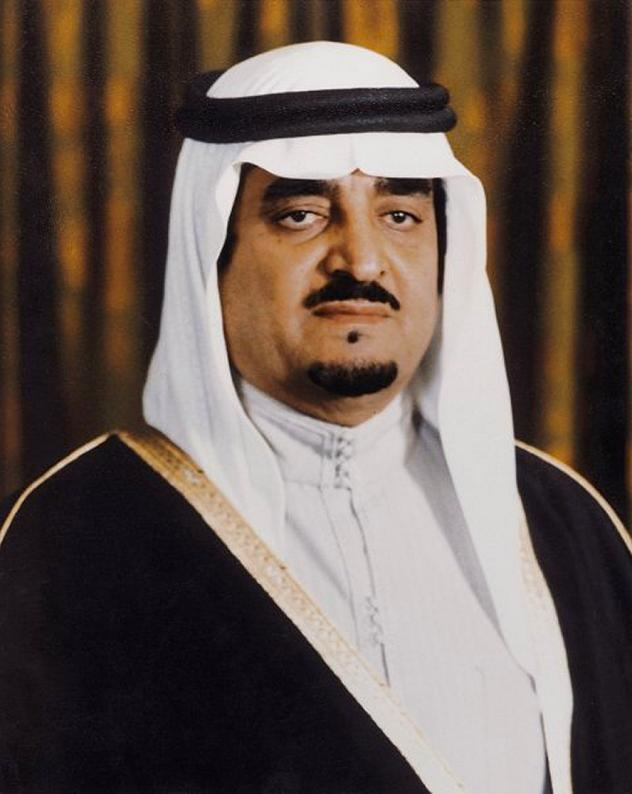
King Fahd

Reign: 13 June 1982 – 1 August 2005

| Location | Name | Type |
|---|---|---|
| Riyadh | King Fahd Sports City Stadium | Sports |
| Riyadh | King Fahad Medical City | Healthcare |
| Riyadh | King Fahad National Library | Cultural |
| Riyadh | King Fahd Road | Infrastructure |
| Riyadh | King Fahd Mosque | Religious |
| Riyadh | King Fahd Security College | Education |
| Dammam | King Fahd International Airport | Infrastructure |
| Dammam | King Fahd Military Medical Complex, Dammam | Military |
| Dammam | King Fahd Specialist Hospital | Healthcare |
| Khobar | King Fahd University Hospital | Healthcare |
| Dhahran | King Fahd University of Petroleum and Minerals | Education |
| Jubail | King Fahd Industrial Port | Infrastructure |
| Jubail | King Fahd Naval Academy | Military |
| Yanbu | King Fahd Industrial Port | Infrastructure |
| Medina | King Fahd Glorious Quran Printing Complex | Religious |
| Taif | King Fahd Sports City Stadium | Sports |
| Taif | King Fahd Air Base | Military |
| Buraydah | King Fahd Specialist Hospital, Buraydah | Healthcare |
| Jeddah | King Fahd Hospital | Healthcare |
| Jeddah | King Fahd's Fountain | Landmark |
| Jeddah | King Fahd Road | Infrastructure |
| Mecca | King Fahd Road | Infrastructure |
| Mecca / Jeddah | King Fahd Satellite Telecommunications City | Infrastructure |
| Bisha | King Fahd Dam | Infrastructure |
| Bahrain / Saudi Arabia | King Fahd Causeway | Infrastructure |
| Bahrain / Saudi Arabia | King Fahd Island | Artificial island |
| Kuwait | King Fahd Road | Infrastructure |
| Bamako | King Fahd Bridge | Infrastructure |
| Buenos Aires | King Fahd Islamic Cultural Center | Religious |
| Edinburgh | King Fahd Mosque | Religious |
| Alipašino polje | King Fahd Mosque | Religious |
| Tangier | Ecole Supérieure Roi Fahd de Traduction | Education |
| South Western Sydney | Malek Fahd Islamic School | Education |
| Germany | King Fahd Academy | Education |
| London Borough of Ealing | King Fahd Academy | Education |

=== Abdullah ===
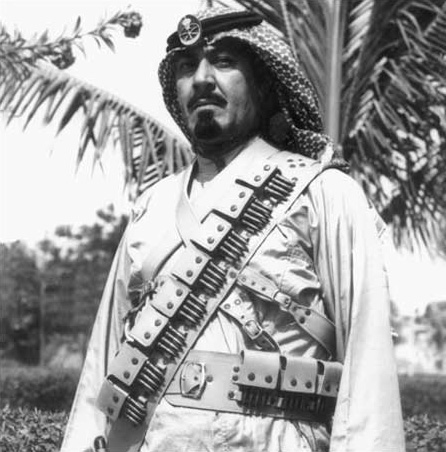
King Abdullah

Reign: 1 August 2005 – 23 January 2015

| Location | Name | Type |
|---|---|---|
| Riyadh | King Abdullah City for Atomic and Renewable Energy | Research |
| Riyadh | King Abdullah Petroleum Studies and Research Center | Research |
| Riyadh | King Abdullah Financial District | Economic |
| Riyadh | King Abdullah Gardens | botanical garden |
| Riyadh | King Abdullah Park | Recreation |
| Jeddah | King Abdullah Sports City Stadium | Sports |
| Jeddah | King Abdullah Street | Infrastructure |
| Buraydah | King Abdullah Sports City Stadium Buraydah | Sports |
| Jizan | King Abdullah International Airport | Transport |
| Rabigh | King Abdullah Economic City | Economic |
| Thuwal | King Abdullah University of Science and Technology | Education |
| Northern Virginia | King Abdullah Academy | Education |

=== Salman ===
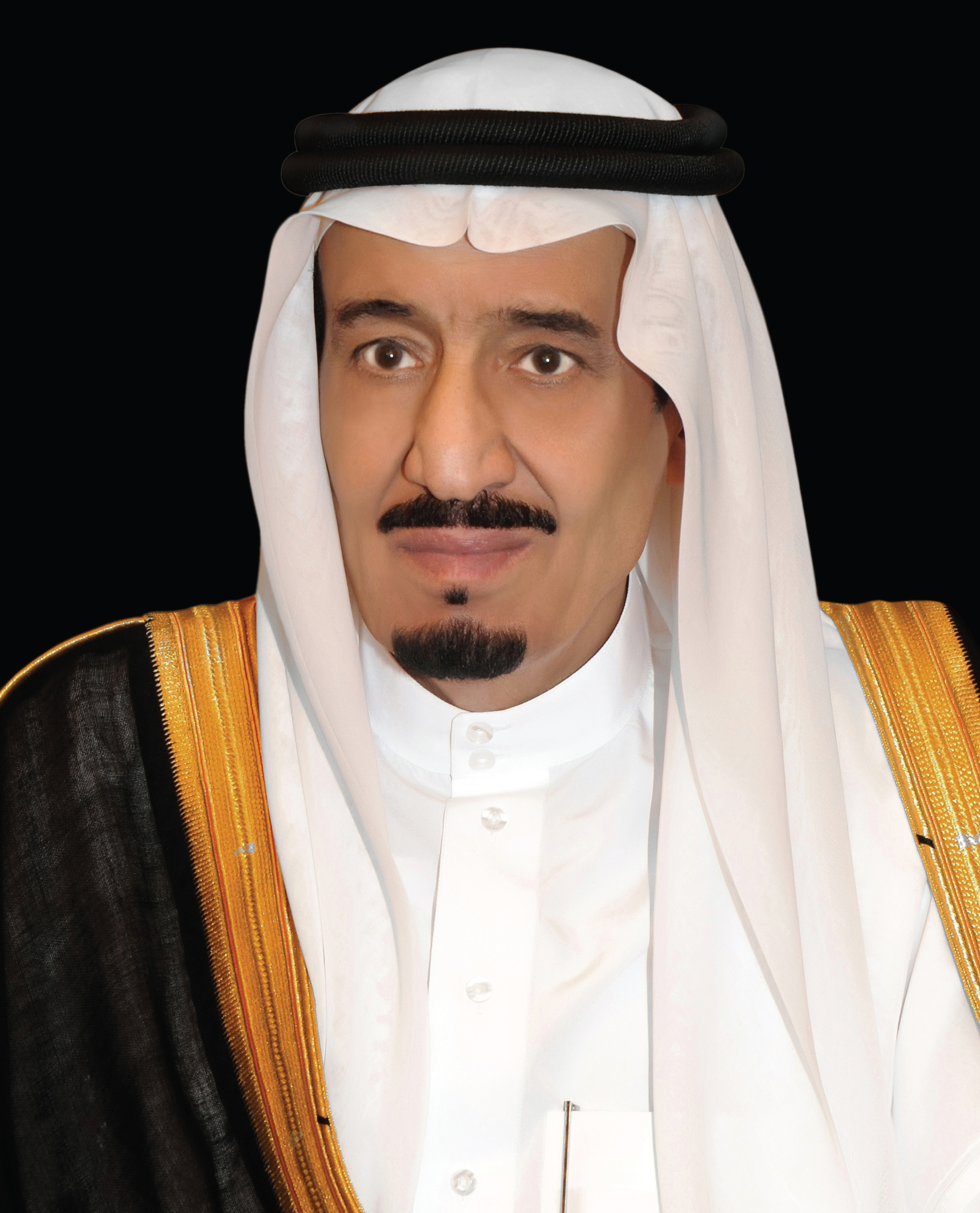
King Salman

Reign: 23 January 2015 – present

| Location | Name | Type |
|---|---|---|
| Riyadh | King Salman International Airport | Infrastructure |
| Riyadh | King Salman Air Base | Military |
| Riyadh | King Salman International Stadium | Sports |
| Riyadh | King Salman Center for Disability Research | Research |
| Riyadh | King Salman Central Library | Education |
| Riyadh | King Salman Humanitarian Aid and Relief Center | Humanitarian |
| Riyadh | King Salman Park | Urban park |
| Riyadh | King Salman Social Center | Social |
| Riyadh | King Salman Global Academy for Arabic Language | Education |
| Sinai Peninsula | King Salman International University | Education |
| Dammam / Al-Ahsa | King Salman Energy Park | Economic |
| Ras Al-Khair | King Salman Global Maritime Industries Complex | Industrial |
| Mecca | King Salman Gate | Religious |
| Malé | King Salman Mosque | Religious |

== Gallery ==
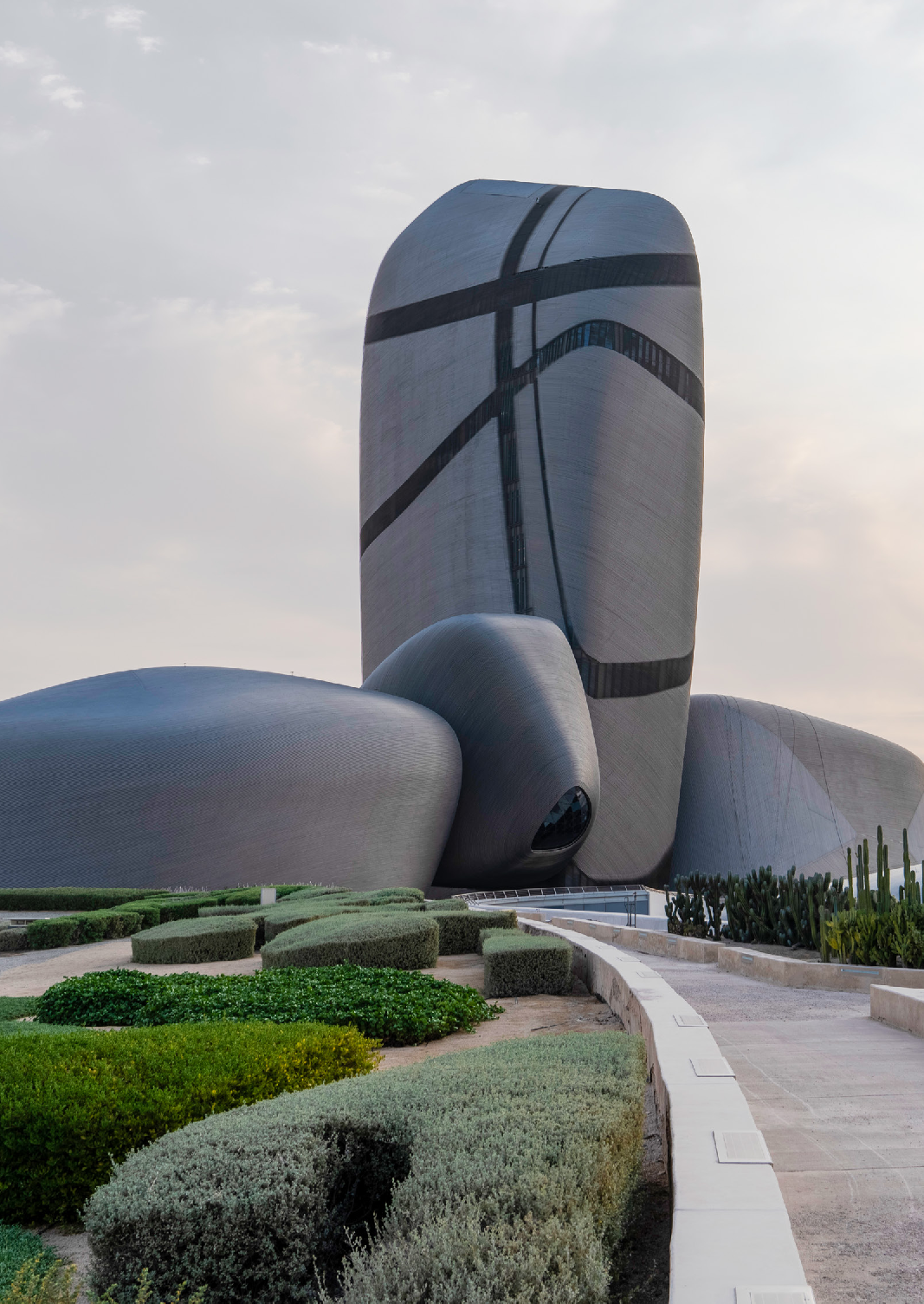
Dhahran – King Abdulaziz Center for World Culture

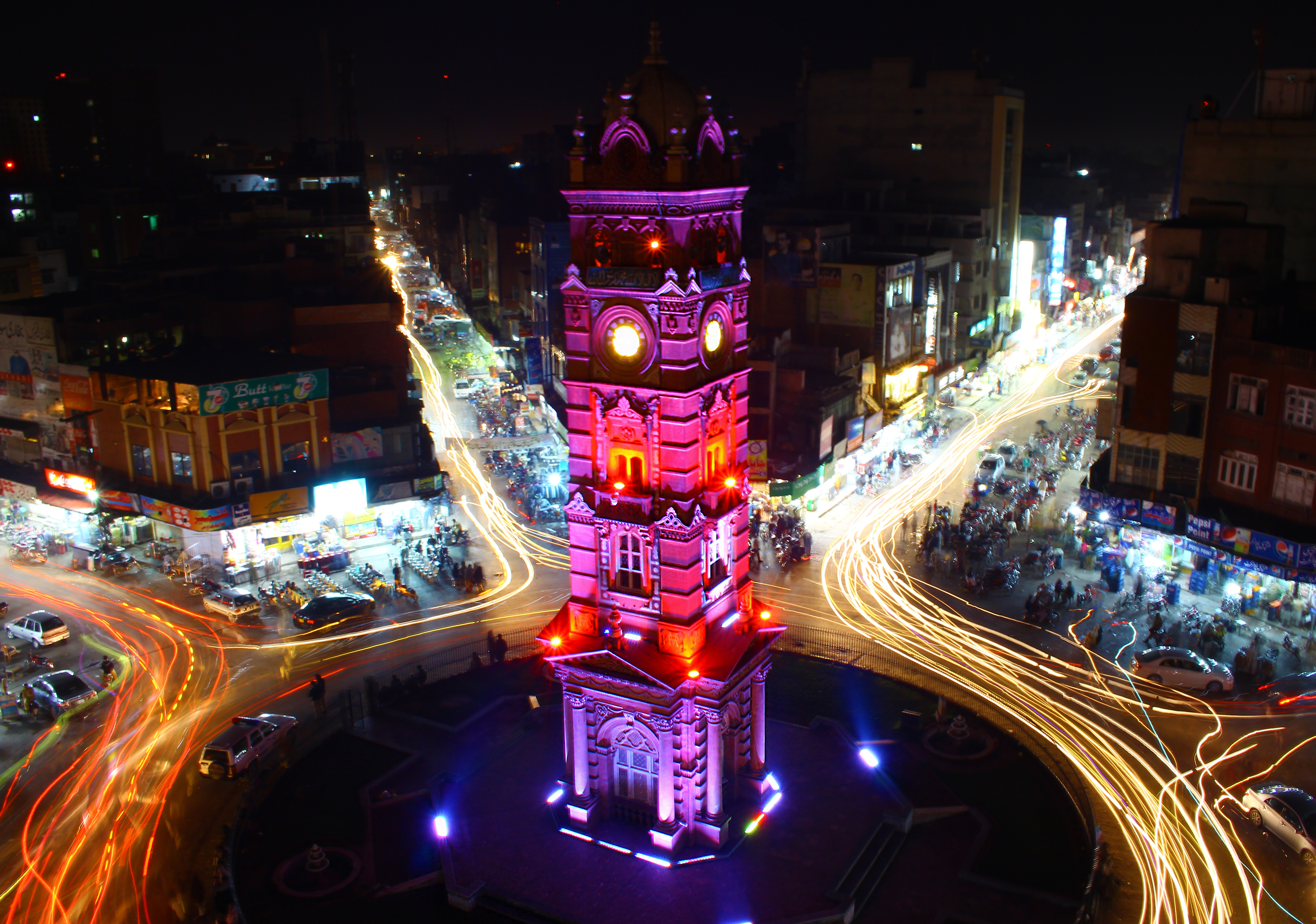
Pakistan – Faisalabad

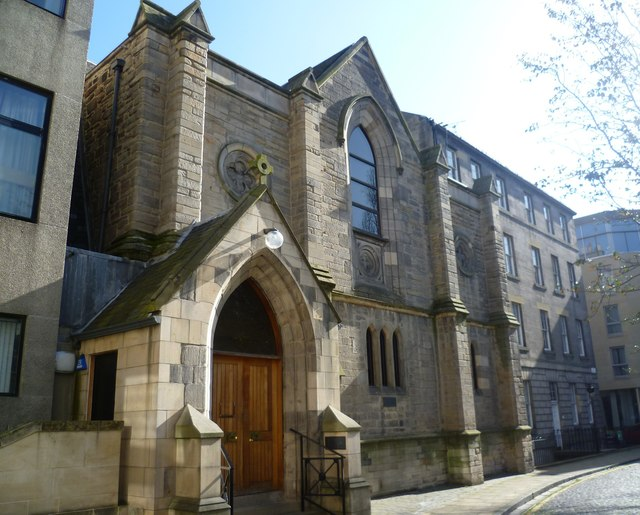
Edinburgh — King Khalid Building

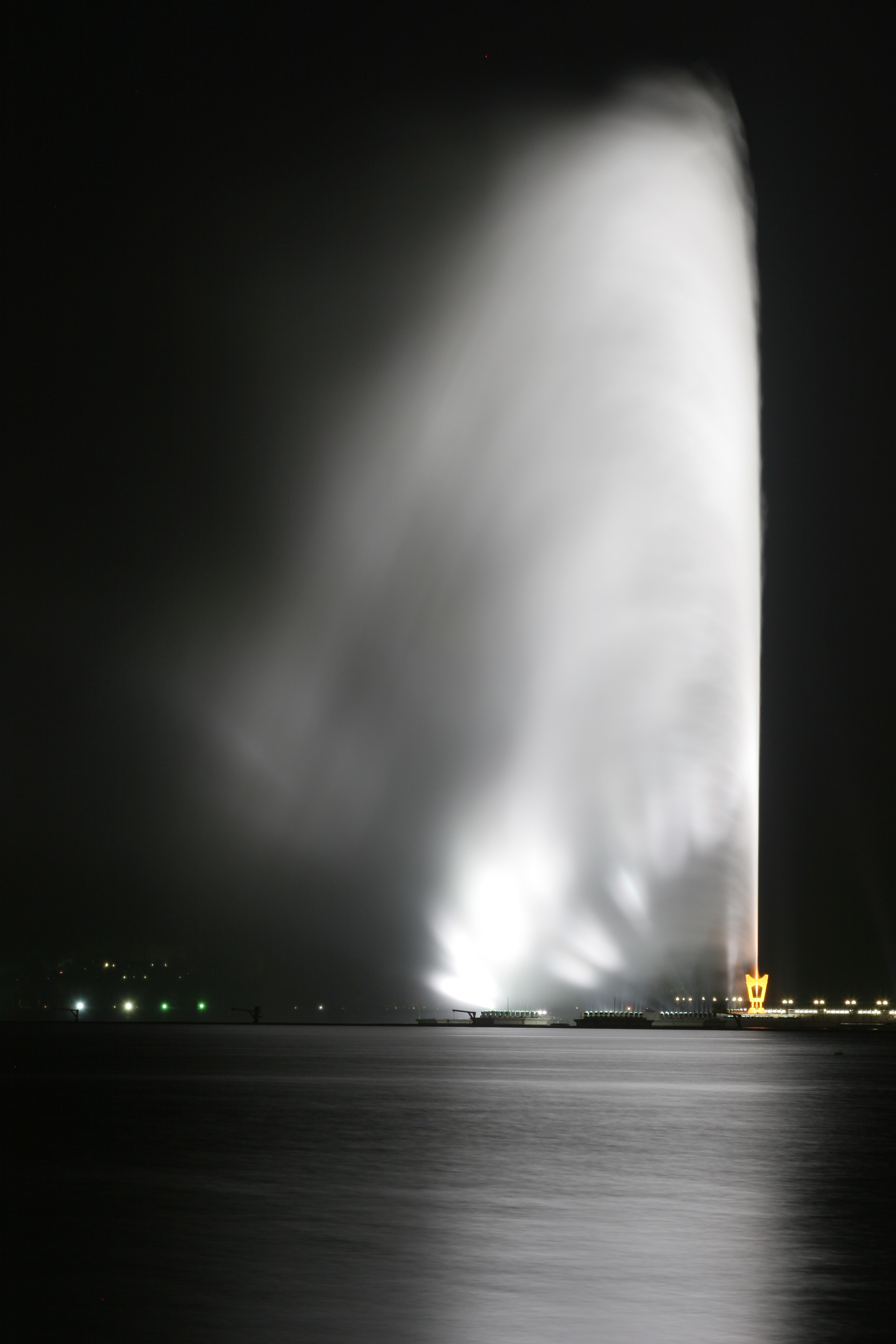
Jeddah — King Fahd's Fountain

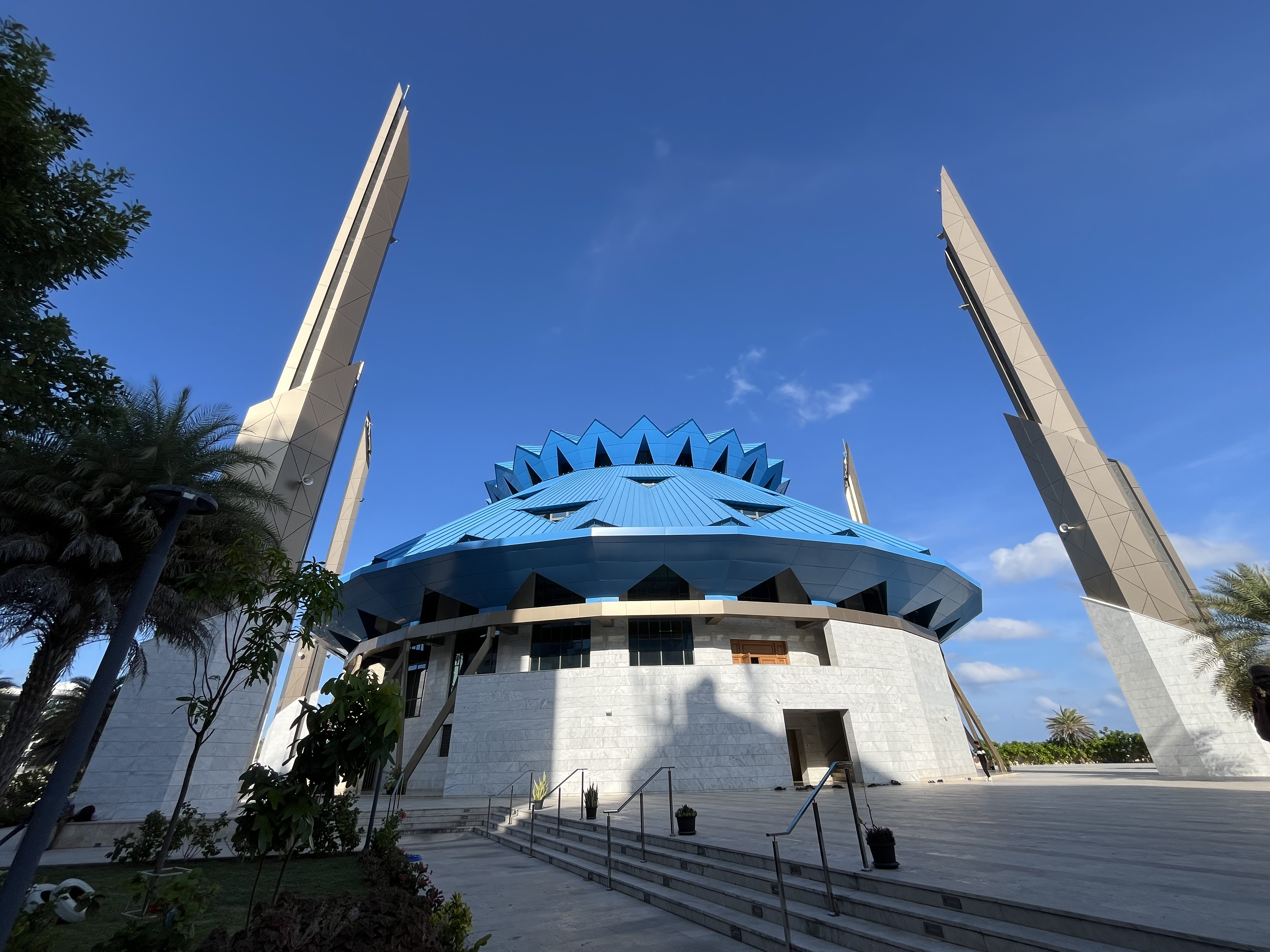
Malé — King Salman Mosque

== See also ==
- House of Saud
- Provinces of Saudi Arabia
