= Amina Lahbabi-Peters =

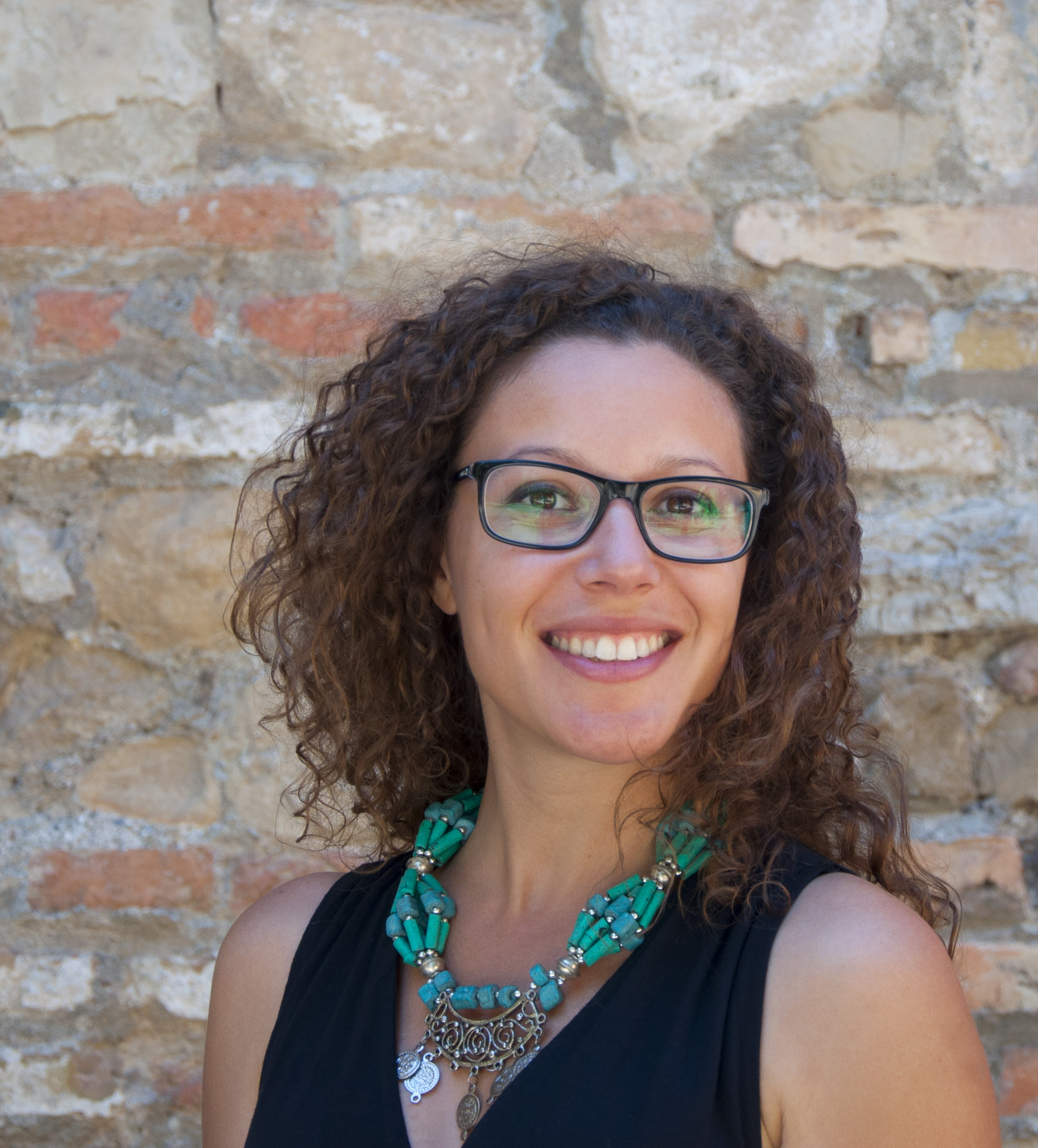
- Born: Tangier, Morocco
- Other name: née Amina Lahbabi
- Education: Abdelmalek Essaâdi University, Michigan State University
- Occupations: Interpreter, translator, branding, marketing and Communication for Development specialist
- Spouse: Lucas Peters
- Website: http://www.aminalahbabi.com/

Amina Lahbabi-Peters, née Amina Lahbabi is a Moroccan interpreter and translator, who has gone on to become a branding, marketing and Communication for Development specialist.

== Life and career ==
Amina Lahbabi was born in Tangier, Morocco into a family that spoke both Arabic and French and an environment that was influenced by Spanish culture. A multilinguist who also spent fourteen years studying and living in an English-speaking environment, she is fluent in Arabic, English, French and Spanish. At a young age, she had an involvement in different civil society organizations, such as the Scouting-related Fédération Nationale du Scoutisme Marocain.

Lahbabi gained a degree in English languages and literature, with a specialization in discourse analysis and sociolinguistics, at Abdelmalek Essaâdi University in Tétouan, a city in northern Morocco. From there, she gained a master's degree in translation at the King Fahd School of Translation in Tangier. Awarded a Fulbright scholarship, she then went to study for a second master's degree in advertising and marketing at Michigan State University (MSU) in the United States.

In 2008, while studying at MSU, Lahbabi acted as team leader for an international group of students who carried out market research to help the town of Marine City, Michigan promote itself as a tourist attraction. She also co-founded the International Sponsored Students Organization at MSU in 2007 and volunteered in several community action projects helping minorities and refugees.

After finishing her first master's degree, Lahbabi worked for three years in management positions at Al Akhawayn University in Ifrane, Morocco. While in the United States, she worked as a marketing and communications consultant for non-governmental organizations and for the local chamber of commerce. Returning to Morocco in 2009, she again found work at Al Akhawayn University as Director for Communication and Development, where she developed the institution's first branding and communication strategy and led innovative communication actions with her team. For a time, Lahbabi worked as a Communication and Visibility Officer at the UNESCO headquarters in Paris, where she led innovative and successful global campaigns and initiatives in Communication for Development, working particularly in the Southern Mediterranean/MENA region, Africa and Europe. Throughout her career, she has also worked as a translator, interpreter, newspaper contributor, and writer, as well as a freelance graphic designer, illustrator and photographer.

Lahbabi-Peters is married to photographer and writer, Lucas Peters, and currently lives in Paris, France.

== Books ==
Lahbabi wrote a self-improvement book, Les Couleurs de la Vie and this was published by Édilivre on 8 January 2016, ISBN 2334026743.

Reviewing Les Couleurs de la Vie for Kenzi+, Kenza Tazi describes the work as a collection of philosophical reflections that tell us about the different colours of life and their relation to experiences such as "self-esteem, love, the need to have objectives and to fight to reach them." She says that the book encourages optimistic and positive thought to cope with life's difficulties and to move forward, and that it is therapeutic for readers who are overwhelmed by negativity.

== Selected publications ==
- Networks of Mediterranean Youth (NET-MED Youth) project annuals reports submitted to the European Commission, 2015–2017
- NET-MED Youth website news and stories, 2015–2017:
  - "A Young Libyan User’s Manual for Burying the Hatchet", NET-MED Youth website, July 2015
  - "From Tragedy to Action: How Employment Policies Can Guarantee Job Safety", NET-MED Youth website, September 2016
  - "Youth Raise Awareness with Creative Integrated Communication Campaign", NET-MED Youth website, November 2016
  - "World Radio Day 2017: Bringing in Youth Audiences", NET-MED Youth website, February 2017
- Lahbabi, Amina (27 March 2015). "5 Tips for Arab Region University Students to Avoid Culture Shock". U.S. News & World Report. Archived from the original on 6 November 2018.
- Lahbabi, Amina (20 May 2015). "Extracurricular Activities Grow at Arab Region Universities". U.S. News & World Report. Archived from the original on 6 November 2018.
- Peters, Lucas (25 October 2016). Moon Morocco (Travel Guide). Berkeley, California: Moon Travel. ISBN 978-1631211577. Photography for the book.
- "Mediterranean Superheroes" promotional video series, scripted, edited and produced in Arabic and English for NET-MED Youth project as part of a global campaign #BuildTomorrow (focus: MENA region), 2017.

== Interviews ==
- Packer, Jeri (4 June 2008). "International MSU team helps MC in tourism efforts: Improving signage, increasing awareness top priorities" (PDF). The Voice. The Voice Newspapers. pp. 1, 16. Archived (PDF) from the original on 6 November 2018.
- Lahbabi-Peters, Amina (21 March 2014). "Amina Lahbabi, un bel exemple de réussite!" [Amina Lahbabi, a great example of success!] (PDF). La Chronique (Interview). Interviewed by Filali Nour'Eddine. p. 4. Archived (PDF) from the original on 6 November 2018.
- Staff (15 December 2016). "New project aims to empower youth in the Mediterranean region". UN News. United Nations. Archived from the original on 6 November 2018. Interview also available in Arabic and French.
