= Sharafiyah Housing Towers =

Jeddah Urgent Housing Project
- مشروع الإسكان العاجل بجدة (Arabic)
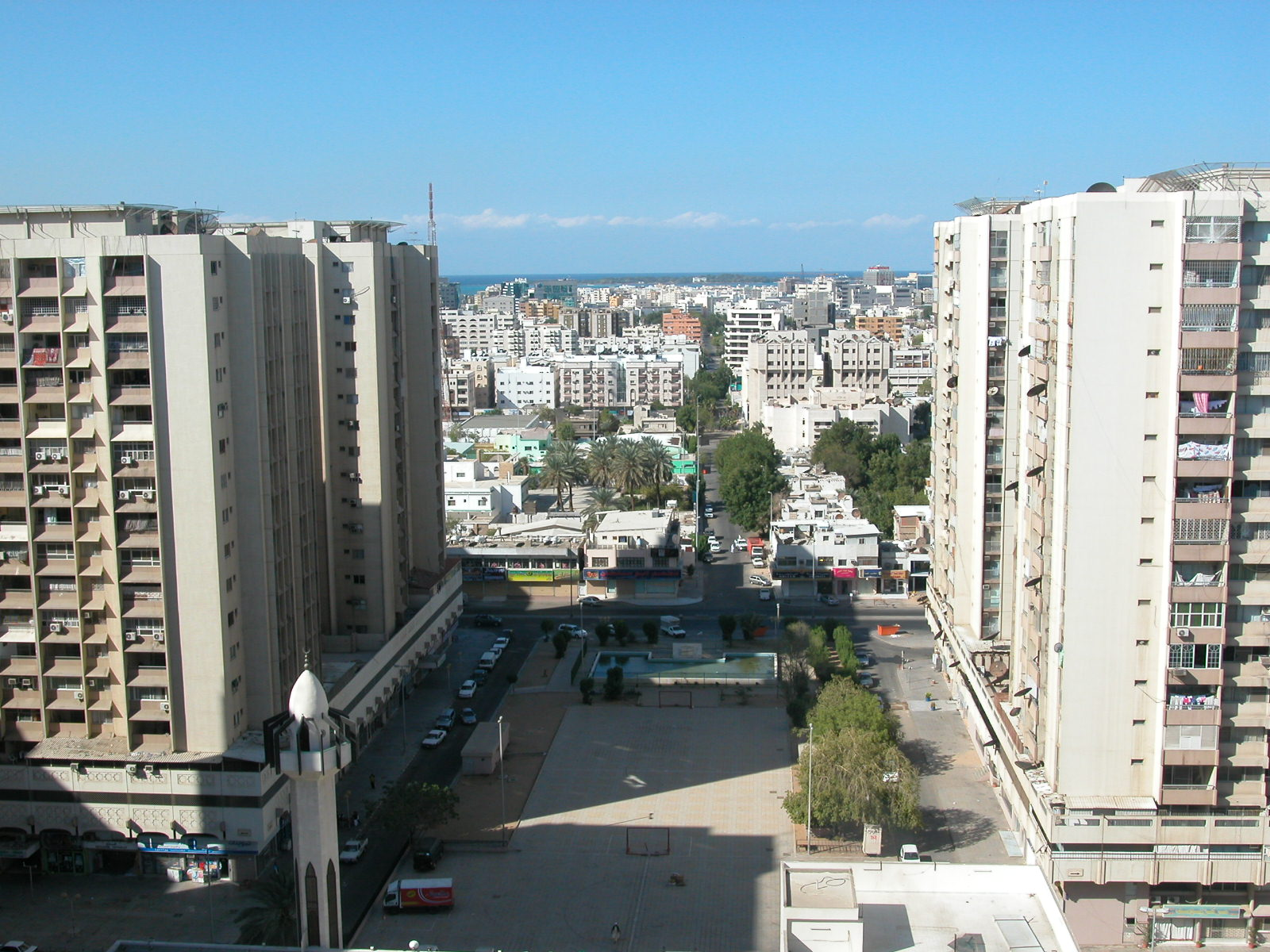
- View of the Red Sea from the Sharafiyah Housing Towers.

General information
- Architectural style: Modernist brutalism
- Location: Tawbah Street, Ash Sharafiyah District, Jeddah, Saudi Arabia
- Coordinates: 21°30′49.64″N 39°11′27.44″E
- Construction started: 1977
- Inaugurated: 1 March 1980
- Client: Saudi government
- Owner: Ministry of Public Works and Housing

Technical details
- Floor area: Podium: 10,000 m^{2} (110,000 sq ft); Tower: 950 m^{2} (10,200 sq ft)

Other information
- Public transit: Bus: Saudi Public Transport Company, Routes 8, 9, and 9B (via King Fahd Road)

The Sharafiyah Housing Towers, officially known as the Jeddah Urgent Housing Project, refers to 32 high-rise buildings located at King Fahd Road and Tawbah Street, Al-Sharafiyah District in central Jeddah. The entire complex is grouped into four 18-storey residential towers on a three storey podium for commercial space.

The Saudi government needed to address a national housing shortage during the economic boom caused by oil revenues in the 1970s. As a result, the construction began in 1977 led by three French contractors supervised by three German consultants. The complex was opened in 1980, permanently shaping Jeddah's low-rise skyline. As a result, there was reluctance and no one initially moved in.

== History ==
In 1977, the Ministry of Public Works and Housing launched a development scheme called the Rush Housing Project, as part of the second Five Year Development Plan (1975–1980). It led the development of completely prefabricated, high-rise public housing in Dammam, Jeddah, and Riyadh. The Jeddah Urgent housing Project was the second to commence within the scheme, with Riyadh as the last of the three. An empty plot of 157,000 square meters of land in the city centre was chosen for development. It was located at al-Setteen Street, positioned on the western side of the old Jeddah Airport. On 1 April 1977, the formal contract was signed before King Khalid returned from an overseas medical trip, and issued orders to increase state employee salaries by 50%.

=== Construction ===
Afterwards, works were led by three French construction companies, SAE, Thenet-Dumez, and Boyques, working under the supervision of German consultant firms Dorsch Consult and Boll & Partner, Kimming & Schwab. The three contractors operated competitively rather collaboratively, as the Saudi government aimed to rush construction. SAE established a precast-concrete factory to supply the project, and other regional developments including a seawater desalination plant. Subsequently, the complex was built using prefabricated construction methods, and large precast concrete plants were also established on-site by the contractors. These plants produced reinforced load-bearing concrete panels for the walls and roofing, which were transported and assembled using cranes. As it was led by a European venture, the complex featured several unfamiliar additions, including vertical garbage chutes, a central communal garden, and shared public spaces on the third floor of each tower podium. As a result, these amenities became under-utilised even up to present. In total, the project cost approximately 2.15 billion Saudi Riyals. After two years of construction, works were finalised in 1979.

=== Opening ===
The housing complex was officially opened on 1 March 1980. Although the project sought to solve the housing shortage, no one had moved in by 1983. The towers remained largely unoccupied until the beginning of the Gulf War in 1990. During the war, Kuwaiti families began temporarily moving into the complex as it provided a reliable shelter for those displaced from the conflicts. Onwards, it became highly sought by residents looking to live in central Jeddah. By 2015, the complex housed up to 16,000 residents across 2,800 families.

== Present ==
By 2017 essential amenities provided by the housing complex began to age and deteriorate. The elevators, over 40 years old, were unable to be serviced due to the unavailability of spare papers for its model. Residents also commonly reported frequent sewage leaks, lack of surveillance, no dedicated security as the previous contractor's agreement expired, shortage of cleaning staff, abandoned vehicles occupying the parking space, and residents paying additional cleaning costs despite annual maintenance fees. In response, the General Department of Engineering Affair conducted a study to modernize the current elevators, and a new security service was submitted for inclusion in an upcoming budget.

== Layout ==
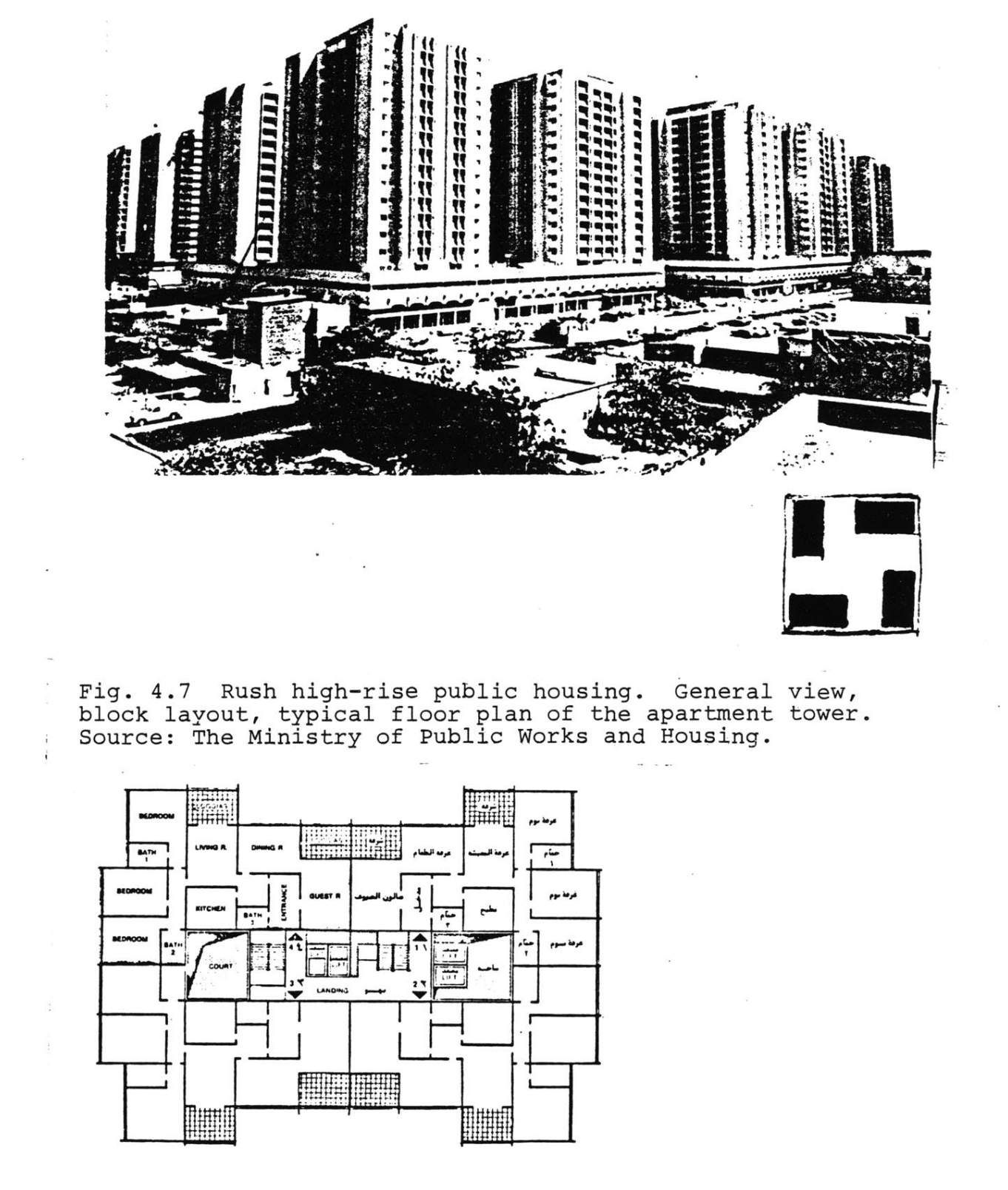
View of the housing complex (top) and residential floor plan (bottom).

The entire complex composed a total of 32 towers, grouped into eight 100 by 100 square meter clusters. The first three stories of each podium were reserved for commerce, office, and parking spaces. The top of podium serves as a platform where the four residential towers rise by 15 storeys. Each individual tower has a dimension of 40 x 28 meters, with every floor featuring four identical 225 meter squared apartments. In total, the entire complex provided 1,936 apartment units upon completion in 1979.

Today, the complex features gated residential complexes, schools, mosques, markets, internal gardens, and internal road networks.

=== Architecture ===
The facades of each tower is decorated with locally-sourced stones and poster, featuring open balconies and corridors to improve ventilation and allow natural light to pass through. Each facade of the clusters are reminiscent of traditional Islamic architecture, featuring wide windows. The complex was built using reinforced concrete, stones and plaster, aluminium, reflective glass, and marble and ceramic flooring.
