= Aishath Aniya =

Maldives political activist and journalist (1966 – 2023)

- Born: 1966
- Died: August 23, 2023; Bangalore, India
- Known for: Journalism; activism
- Political party: Maldivian Democratic Party (until 2022)

Aishath Aniya (1966 – 20 August 2023) was a Maldivian political activist and journalist.

Aniya served as Deputy Secretary-General of the Maldivian Democratic Party. In 2006, she was one of a number of MDP supporters arrested at a peaceful demonstration and she went on a hunger strike in protest. In March 2007, an article she wrote Minivan Daily opposing the burqa was the subject of intense criticism and she received death threats. She resigned her position with the MDP and was arrested, but released by the Supreme Council of Islamic Affairs.

Aniya was a host for Minivan Radio. In 2019, she received threats and harassment after tweeting that the King Salman Mosque was an "ugly structure". Aniya left the Maldivian Democratic Party in 2022.

Aishath Aniya died on 20 August 2023 in a hospital in Bangalore.
