= Khalid Al-Rubeaan =

Saudi endocrinologist & diabetologist (born 1956)

Khalid Ali Al-Rubeaan (born February 13, 1956) is a Saudi endocrinologist and diabetologist.

== Early life and education ==
Khalid Ali Al-Rubeaan
- Born: February 13, 1956 (age 70); Saudi Arabia
- Education: King Saud University (MBBS) Royal College of Physicians and Surgeons of Canada (FRCSC)
- Occupations: Endocrinologist, diabetologist, academic
- Notable work: Saudi National Diabetes Registry
- Awards: Novo Nordisk Research Merit Award in Diabetes Research (2002) Arabian Award for Diabetes Education (2001)

Al-Rubeaan earned his Bachelor of Medicine, Bachelor of Surgery (M.B.B.S.) from the College of Medicine at King Saud University in July 1980 and currently serves as a consultant Endocrinologist. He is the director of the University Diabetes Center at King Saud University and heads the Saudi National Diabetes Registry. He is known for his research on the epidemiology, genetics, and clinical management of diabetes mellitus in Saudi Arabia.

Al-Rubeaan completed his master's degree in epidemiology from the University of Alberta, Canada, and was appointed as a Fellow of the Royal College of Physicians and Surgeons of Canada (F.R.C.P.(C)) in November 1988. He completed Special Competence training in Endocrinology and Metabolism at the same institution and specialized as an endocrinologist and diabetologist from March 1988 to September 1989.

== Career ==
His appointments include executive director of the Strategic Center for Diabetes Research and the head of the Saudi National Diabetes Registry. Earlier in his career, he headed the Endocrine Unit at the Medical College of King Saud University (1995–1998) and chaired the Pharmacy and Therapeutics Committee at King Khalid University (1993–1997).

He organized diabetes education courses for primary care physicians from 1997 to 2001 and co-founded the Gulf Group for the Study of Diabetes (GGSD). He served as president of the Pan Arab Group for the Study of Endocrinology and Diabetes from 2003 to 2004.

== International roles ==
Al-Rubeaan is chairman of the board of trustees and founder of the Diabetes Science International Foundation, based in Basel, Switzerland. He has served as editor-in-chief of the International Journal of Diabetes Mellitus, published by Elsevier, since April 2009, and of Al-Sukhari Magazine, published by the Diabetes Science International Foundation, since 1997. He has also worked as a part-time consultant to the World Health Organization's Regional Office for the Eastern Mediterranean (EMRO) in Cairo, Egypt.

=== Research and patents ===
He is an inventor on two international patents:

- A Mediator-less Electrochemical Glucose Sensing Procedure Employing the Leach-proof Covalent Binding of Enzyme to the Electrodes and Products Thereof (WO2013/165318 A1), filed May 3, 2013
- Wound Dressing Comprising of Silver Chitosan (WO 2012/143788 A1) filed April 19, 2012

He secured a Novo Nordisk Research Merit Award in Diabetes Research in 2002 and the Arabian Award for Diabetes Education in 2001.

=== Author ===
Al-Rubeaan has authored and co-authored more than 100 peer-reviewed publications, with several Arabic-language books on diabetes, including Diabetes from A to Z (2002, contributing author), Notions that Need to Be Corrected about Diabetes Mellitus (2009), Deportments Related to Diabetes (2010), and Diabetes Inheritance (2014).

He contributed to World Health Organization reports on national diabetes programs and diabetic retinopathy prevention and wrote a chapter on the epidemic of type 2 diabetes in Diabetes in the Arab World (2005).

== Selected publications ==
- Al-Rubeaan, K., et al. (2015). Diabetic foot complications and their risk factors from a large retrospective cohort study. PLOS ONE, 10(5), e0124446. DOI: 10.1371/journal.pone.0124446
- Vashist, S. K., et al. (2011). Advances in carbon nanotube-based electrochemical sensors for bioanalytical applications. Biotechnology Advances, 29(2), 169–188. DOI: 10.1016/j.biotechadv.2010.10.002
- Collison, K. S., et al. (2010). Sugar-sweetened carbonated beverage consumption correlates with BMI, waist circumference, and poor dietary choices in school children. BMC Public Health, 10, 234. DOI: 10.1186/1471-2458-10-234
- Sacks, F. M., et al. (2014). Association between plasma triglycerides and high-density lipoprotein cholesterol and microvascular kidney disease and retinopathy in type 2 diabetes mellitus: A global case-control study. Circulation, 129(9), 999–1008. DOI: 10.1161/CIRCULATIONAHA.113.002529
- Vashist, S. K., et al. (2011). Delivery of drugs and biomolecules using carbon nanotubes. Carbon, 49(13), 4077–4097. DOI: 10.1016/j.carbon.2011.05.022
- Saeb, A. T. M., et al. (2014). Production of silver nanoparticles with strong and stable antimicrobial activity against highly pathogenic and multidrug-resistant bacteria. The Scientific World Journal, 2014, 704708. DOI: 10.1155/2014/704708
- Fruchart, J. C., et al. (2014). Residual macrovascular risk in 2013: What have we learned? Cardiovascular Diabetology, 13, 26. DOI: 10.1186/1475-2840-13-26
- Vashist, S. K., et al. (2011). Technology behind commercial devices for blood glucose monitoring in diabetes management: A review. Analytica Chimica Acta, 703(2), 124–136. DOI: 10.1016/j.aca.2011.07.024
- Al-Rubeaan, K., et al. (2014). Diabetic nephropathy and its risk factors in a society with a type 2 diabetes epidemic: A Saudi National Diabetes Registry-based study. PLOS ONE, 9(2), e88956. DOI: 10.1371/journal.pone.0088956
- Jarallah, J. S., et al. (1999). Prevalence and determinants of smoking in three regions of Saudi Arabia. Tobacco Control, 8(1), 53–56. DOI: 10.1136/tc.8.1.53
