= Taleedah Tamer =

Saudi fashion model

- Born: Jeddah, Makkah Region; Kingdom of Saudi Arabia
- Education: British International School of Jeddah
- Occupation: Model
- Parent(s): Ayman Tamer; Cristina Tamer

Taleedah Tamer (Arabic: تليدة تمر) is a Saudi Arabian fashion model. She is the first Saudi Arabian model to walk a couture runway in Paris and the first to be on the cover of an international magazine.

== Early life and education ==
Taleedah Tamer was born and raised in Jeddah, Makkah in the Kingdom of Saudi Arabia. Her father, Ayman Tamer, is a Saudi businessman who is CEO and chairman of Tamer Group, a pharmaceutical, healthcare, and beauty company. Her mother, Cristina Tamer, is an Italian former dancer and model for Giorgio Armani, Gianfranco Ferré and La Perla. Tamer met the designer Antonio Grimaldi, who she would later model for, when she was ten years old.

She is a graduate of the British International School of Jeddah.

== Career ==
Tamer's first modelling job was for the jewelry company Korloff. She also modeled for Rubaiyat before being photographed by Stefania Paparelli in 2018 as the July/August cover girl for Harper's Bazaar Arabia, making her the first Saudi woman to be featured on the cover of an international magazine and in a global editorial campaign. On 2 July 2018 she opened the 2018-2019 autumn/winter collection Antonio Grimaldi couture show at the Salons France-Amériques in Paris wearing an all-white pantsuit and cape, becoming the first Saudi model to walk in Paris Couture Fashion Week, and the first to walk in a couture fashion show outside of Saudi Arabia. She also closed the Grimaldi show, wearing a silver gown with feathered wings.

== Personal life ==
Tamer is a practicing Muslim. She speaks English, Arabic and Italian. She has a younger brother and sister, and her grandmother is Greek.

She is planning on moving to Milan to study marketing and continue modelling.

Tamer credits Gisele Bündchen, Imaan Hammam, Ameera al-Taweel, and her mother as her inspirations. Tamer has expressed understanding and respect for people from Saudi Arabia who may disapprove of her modelling, but hopes she is able to broaden the perception of what it means to be a modern Saudi woman.
