= Al Thumama =

Al Thumama or Al Thumamah may refer to:

- Al Thumama (Doha), a district in Doha in Qatar
  - Al Thumama Stadium, in Al Thumama, Qatar
- Al Thumamah (Riyadh), an area in northeastern Riyadh, Saudi Arabia
