= King Khalid Wildlife Research Center =

Wildlife observatory in al-Thumamah region of northeastern Riyadh, Saudi Arabia

King Khalid Wildlife Research Center مركز الملك خالد لأبحاث الحياة الفطرية
- Alternative names: Thumamah Research Center
- Named after: King Khalid
- Organization: National Center of Wildlife; Zoological Society of London (until 2016)
- Location: King Khalid Royal Reserve, al-Thumamah, Riyadh, Saudi Arabia
- Coordinates: 25.2206°N 46.6263°E
- Established: 1987; 39 years ago
- Website: www.ncw.gov.sa/En/Wildlife/KKWRC/

King Khalid Wildlife Research Center (KKWRC) (Arabic: مركز الملك خالد لأبحاث الحياة الفطرية), also known as the Thumamah Research Centre, and formerly as al-Thumamah Farm (Arabic: مزرعة الثمامة), is a biological research facility and a wildlife observatory located at the King Khalid Royal Reserve (formerly al-Thumamah Wildlife Park) in the al-Thumamah area of northeastern Riyadh, Saudi Arabia. It was established for the preservation and captive breeding of the country's endangered wildlife in 1987 during the reign of King Fahd and was managed by the Zoological Society of London under the supervision of the Saudi Wildlife Authority (now the National Center of Wildlife) before the former completely handed over administrative duties to the latter in 2016.

== Observatory duties and role ==
The observatory's purpose is to oversee the preservation, propagation and resettlement of over 500 endangered animal species of Saudi Arabia, that include

- Rhim gazelle
- Mountain gazelle
- Erlanger's gazelle
- Nubian ibex
- Arabian oryx
