= Bakri Osman Saeed =

Sudanese medical scientist

- Education: University of Khartoum (BSc.) University of Leeds (PhD)
- Awards: President of the Association of African Universities
- Scientific career
- Fields: Medicine and surgery

Bakri Osman Saeed is president of the Association of African Universities. He is the former Pioneer Dean of St George’s International Medical School.

== Early life and education ==
Bakri Osman Saeed is a Sudanese, a medical scientist. He was president of the Union of Sudanese Students in the United Kingdom and Ireland, London, (1982-1983).

== Academics career ==
Professor Bakri Osman Saeed received his bachelor degree from the University of Khartoum in the field of medicine and surgery and his PhD from University of Leeds, he became a doctor of medicine from the University of Newcastle-upon-Tyne. He started his academic career as a lecturer at the University of Khartoum in Sudan in 1985. He was also one time lecturer at King Saud University in Saudi Arabia.

== Selected publications ==
- Peripheral Bone Mineral Density and Bone Turnover in Postmenopausal Women with Type 2 Diabetes
- Traditional medicine in The Sudan
- Syndrome of Inappropriate Secretion of Antidiuretic Hormone
- Effect of Quinoline-Type Antimalarial Drugs on the Binding of Oestradiol-17β and Progesterone by Rabbit and Human Uterine Cytosols
- Dermal absorption of isopropyl alcohol from a commercial hand rub: Implications for its use in hand decontamination
- Fasting homocysteine levels in adults with type 1 diabetes and retinopathy
- Comparison of three homogeneous methods for measuring high-density lipoprotein cholesterol with a precipitation method in diabetic and non-diabetic subjects
- Plasma homocysteine concentrations in patients with Type 1 diabetes
- Severe hyponatraemia: investigation and management in a district general hospital
- Calculation of coronary risk in Type II diabetes: another cause for concern

== Awards and honors ==
He is the President of the Association of African Universities. He is also the president of Sudan International University.
