= Thumamah Airport =

- IATA: none; ICAO: OETH

Summary
- Airport type: Public
- Location: Ath Thumamah
- Elevation AMSL: 1,870 ft / 570 m
- Coordinates: 25°12′47″N 046°38′28″E
- Interactive map of Thumamah Airport

Runways
Direction	Length		Surface
Direction	m	ft	Surface
17/35	4,014	13,170	Asphalt

Thumamah Airport (ICAO: OETH) is an airport located near ath-Thumamah in northeastern Riyadh, Saudi Arabia. It is located about 28.9 km (18 mi) north of King Khalid International Airport.

== See also ==
- List of longest runways
- Saudi Aviation Club
