= King Abdulaziz University College of Health Sciences =

Saudi Arabia College of Health Sciences

Coordinates: 21.513847°N 39.23231°E

King Abdulaziz University College of Health Sciences is a college of King Abdulaziz University, Saudi Arabia. It comprises departments for pharmacy, surgery, laboratory medicine, and emergency medical services.

== See also ==
- List of things named after Saudi kings
