= Éditions Édilivre =

French publishing company

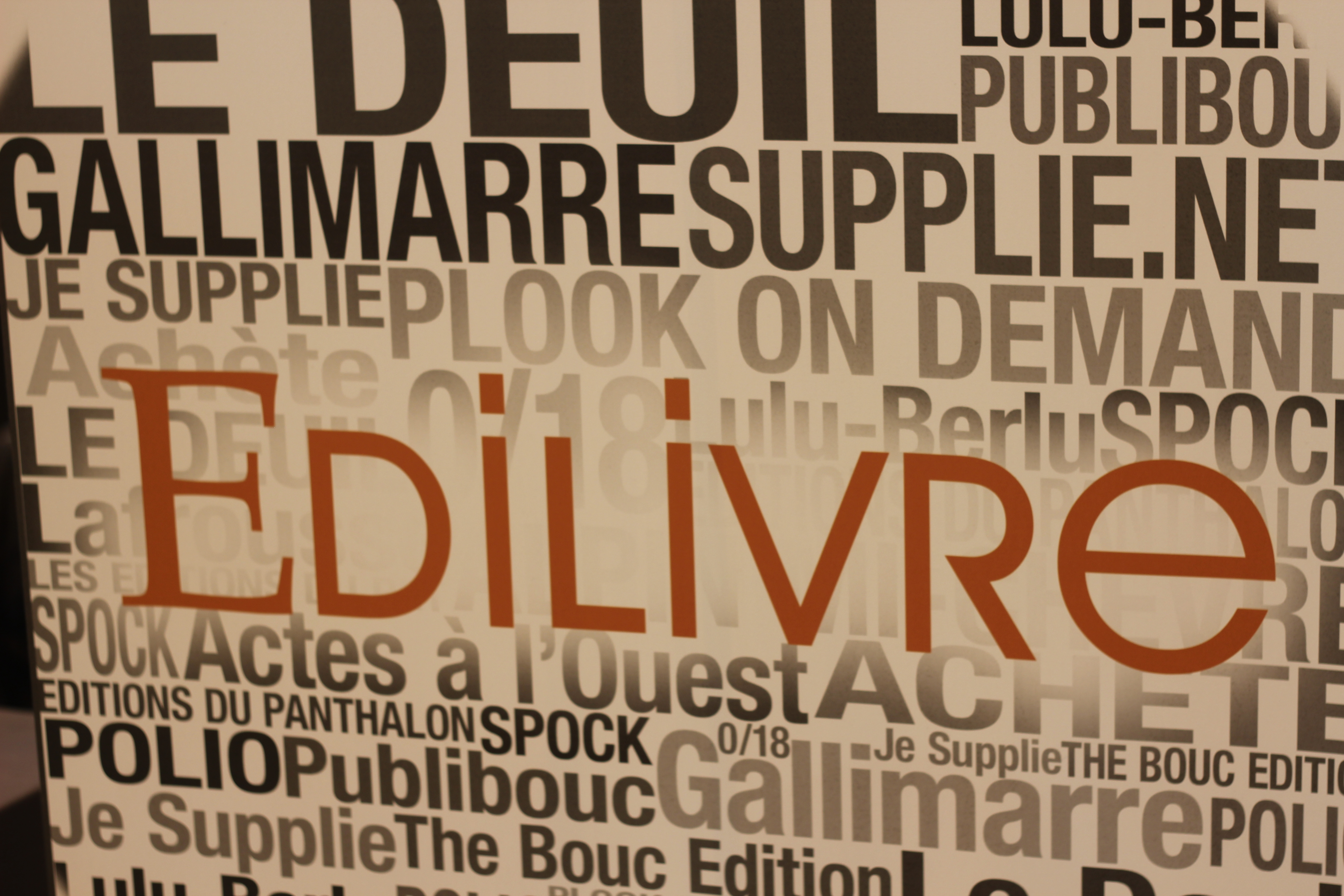
- Founded: 2007; 18 years ago
- Country of origin: France
- Headquarters location: Paris
- Key people: David Stut (CEO)
- Revenue: ▲€2.8 million (2014)
- Official website: www.edilivre.com

Édilivre is a French publishing company founded in 2007 and offering services in Paris. It is presented as a collaborative publishing platform, although critics have described it as a vanity press.

== History ==
Édilivre is part of the AParis company (along with Édithèse, Édidoc, ADomicile and Édifree). It is built on a community of more than 12,000 authors through 27 authors clubs in every region of France, Belgium, Switzerland, Canada, North Africa and overseas through social networks.

The books are published digitally or through print on demand. The publisher also offers printing of out-of-print books available through the Bibliothèque nationale de France's digital library, Gallica.

The publishing house presents itself as distinct from a vanity press, in which authors pay to have their books published. However, it does require authors to pay for several aspects of publication, if they so desire: proofreading, personalized covers, etc. It does not guarantee the promotion of its published works in bookstores, only that they will be available on its digital platform. Critics including Victor de Sepausy have petitioned in protest of the company, accusing it of being a vanity press in disguise.

Éditions Édilivre has participated since its foundation at the Livre Paris book fair.

== Books edited ==
Since its foundation, Édilivre has published more than 19,000 books in various fields:

- novels, science fiction,
- thrillers, poetry, arts,
- stories, children's literature,
- memoirs, biographies, travel books,
- essays, plays,
- guides, tourism,
- B2B books, professional books.

== See also ==
- Small press
- Self-publishing
- Print on demand
