= King Khalid Grand Mosque =

Mosque in Riyadh, Saudi Arabia

- Arabic: جامع الملك خالد
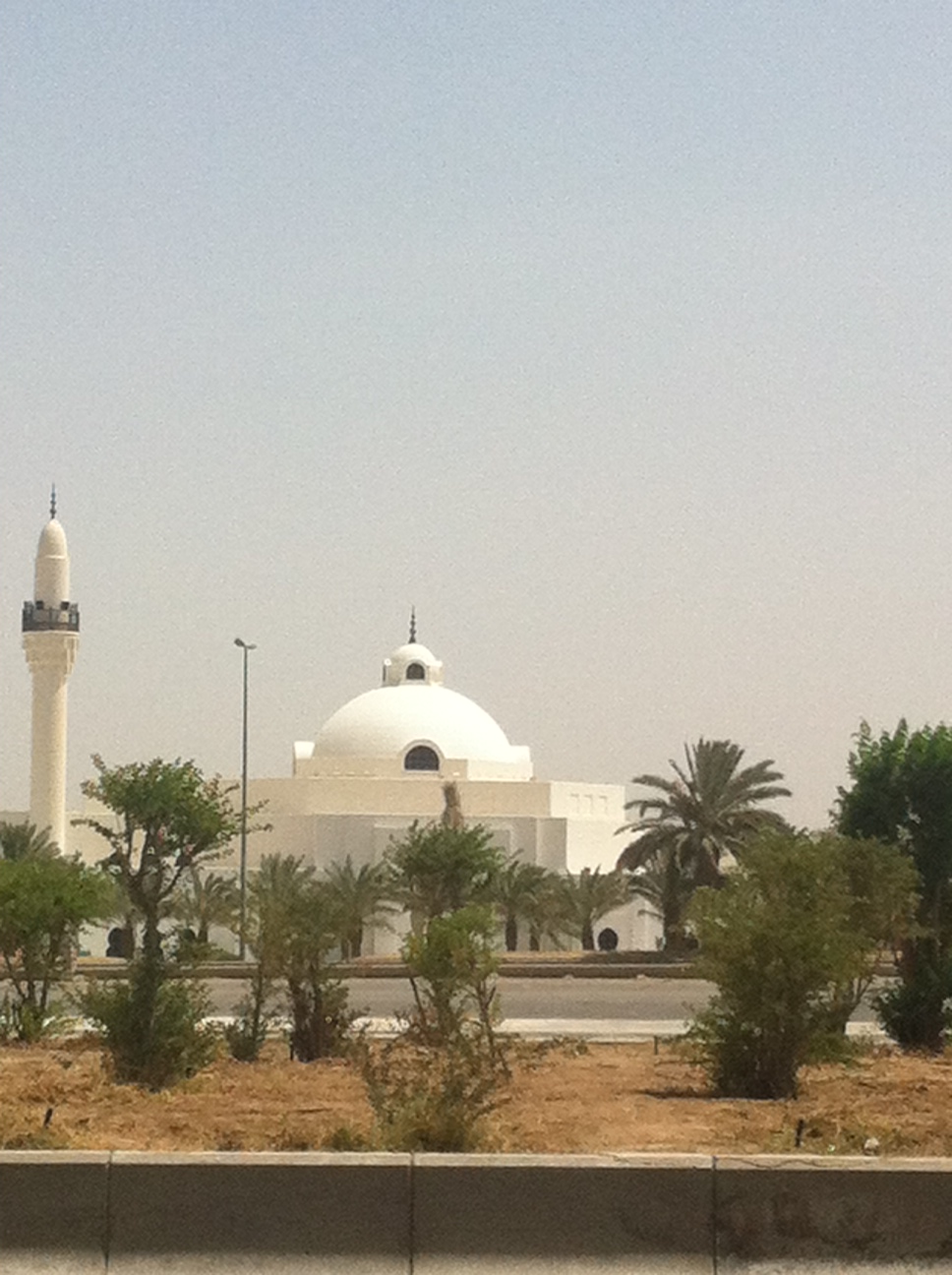
- King Khalid Grand Mosque, 2012

- Location of the mosque in Saudi Arabia

Religion
- Affiliation: Sunni Islam
- Ecclesiastical or organizational status: Mosque
- Status: Active

Location
- Location: Riyadh
- Country: Saudi Arabia
- Interactive map of King Khalid Grand Mosque
- Administration: King Khalid Foundation
- Coordinates: 24°42′3″N 46°39′8″E

Architecture
- Type: Islamic architecture
- Style: Partly Turkish
- Completed: 1988

Specifications
- Capacity: 5,400 worshippers
- Dome: 1
- Minaret: 1

The King Khalid Grand Mosque (Arabic: جامع الملك خالد) is a Sunni Islam Friday mosque and an active place of worship in the Umm al-Hammam al-Gharbi neighborhood of Riyadh, Saudi Arabia. Built in 1987 and opened in 1988, it incorporates some elements of Turkish architecture and is one of the most prominent landmarks of Riyadh.

The mosque usually gets flocked by worshippers during the month of Ramadan to perform Taraweeh prayers and on religious holidays like Eid al-Fitr and Eid al-Adha for Salat al-Eid. It is locally known for providing Islamic funerary services to the deceased, such as ritual baths and prayers and is named after King Khalid bin Abdulaziz, whose relatives funded the mosque's construction.

== History ==
The mosque was funded by relatives of King Khalid bin Abdulaziz, the ruler of Saudi Arabia from 1975 to 1982; and was built in 1987 and officially inaugurated on 14 April 1988. The following day, the mosque's inaugural sermon was held by Sheikh Abd al-Aziz Ibn Baz.

The mosque underwent expansion in 1993 when the women's section was added, and again in 2004. In April 2022, the French ambassador to Saudi Arabia paid a visit to the mosque.

== See also ==
- Islam in Saudi Arabia
- List of mosques in Saudi Arabia
- List of things named after Saudi kings
