= King Fahad Academy =

- أكاديمية الملك فهد بلندن

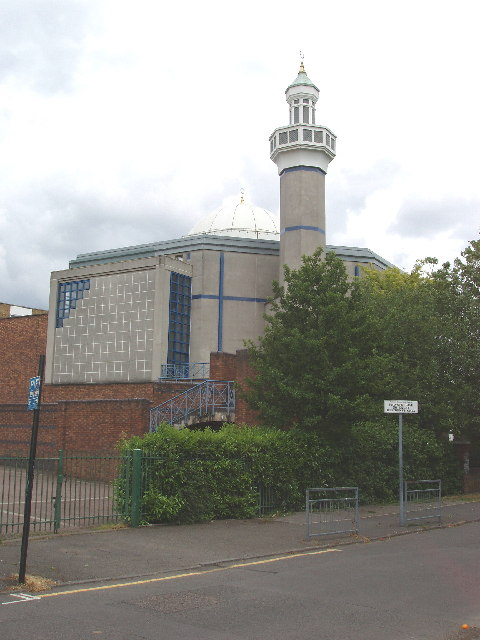
- The academy's mosque and minaret

Location
- Bromyard Avenue, London, W3 7HD. 51.511928°N 0.25189000000000306°W

Information
- Type: Private school
- Religious affiliation: Islam
- Established: 1985
- Closed: 2023
- Local authority: London Borough of Ealing
- Department for Education URN: 101957 Tables
- Ofsted: Reports
- Director General: Tahani Aljafari
- Gender: Mixed
- Age range: 3–18
- Enrolment: 560
- Capacity: 620
- Website: www.thekfa.org.uk

King Fahad Academy (KFA; Arabic: أكاديمية الملك فهد بلندن) was a private school in Acton in the London Borough of Ealing that provided an Islamic-based education for children aged from 3 to 18. The school was on the former site of the Faraday High School (closed in 1984).

It was a registered charity under English law, and the chairman of the board of trustees was Khalid bin Bandar Al Saud (born 1977). The school was founded in September 1985 under the authority of King Fahad Bin Abd Al-Aziz Al-Saud and catered to the children of Saudi diplomats, Arab Muslims, and the local community in London.

In February 2007, the school was featured on BBC's Newsnight programme. The school's director, Dr. Sumaya Aluyusuf, defended the use of Saudi textbooks describing religions other than Islam as "worthless" and comparing their adherents to pigs and monkeys. The books were later edited, and the controversial descriptions removed as they were found to not adhere to Islamic beliefs of equality and peace.

The school was financially supported by the Kingdom of Saudi Arabia since its inception. Due to a lack of funding, the school closed at the end of the academic year 2022/23 as alternate funding was not established. Despite pushback from the Director General, the news regarding the closure was announced internally to staff on Tuesday 2 May 2023, and to parents by the trustees of the school on Friday 5 May 2023.

== See also ==
- List of schools in Ealing
- British International School of Jeddah
- List of things named after Saudi kings
