= King Fahd's Fountain =

Fountain in Jeddah, Saudi Arabia

- نافورة الملك فهد
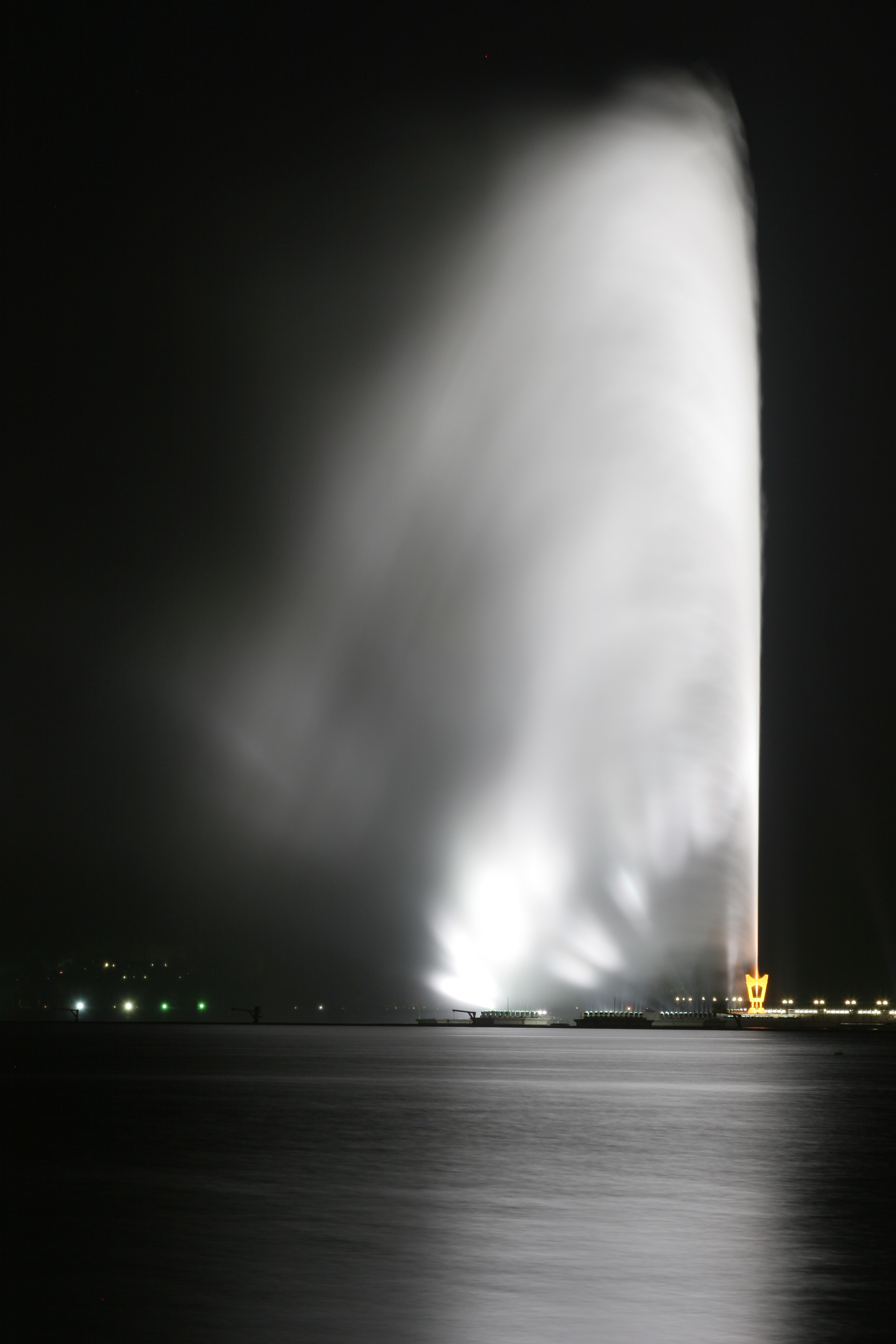
- The fountain illuminated at night
- Interactive map of the King Fahd's Fountain area
- Alternative names: Jeddah Fountain

General information
- Status: Operational
- Location: Jeddah, Mecca Province, Saudi Arabia
- Coordinates: 21°30′56″N 39°8′42″E
- Completed: 1985; 41 years ago
- Owner: Jeddah Municipality

Height
- Height: 312 m (1,024 ft)

Technical details
- Structural system: Fountain
- Material: Seawater (Red Sea)

The King Fahd’s Fountain, also known as the Jeddah Fountain, is a prominent landmark in Jeddah, Saudi Arabia, and holds the distinction of being the tallest fountain in the world.

== History ==
The fountain was initially constructed between 1980 and 1983 and was inspired by the Geneva Fountain, which stands at 140 meters with a pumping speed of 124 mph. However, the initial design did not meet expectations for height, leading to further development.

The fountain was later brought into its current operational form in 1985, when it began pumping seawater at very high pressure to achieve its full height and performance of 312 m (1,024 ft).

Team Red Bull Air Force base jumper Othar Lawrence set a global record by completing a historic jump near the fountain.

== Overview ==
The fountain was gifted to the city of Jeddah by King Fahd, after whom it is named. It was constructed between 1980 and 1983 and was officially launched in 1985.

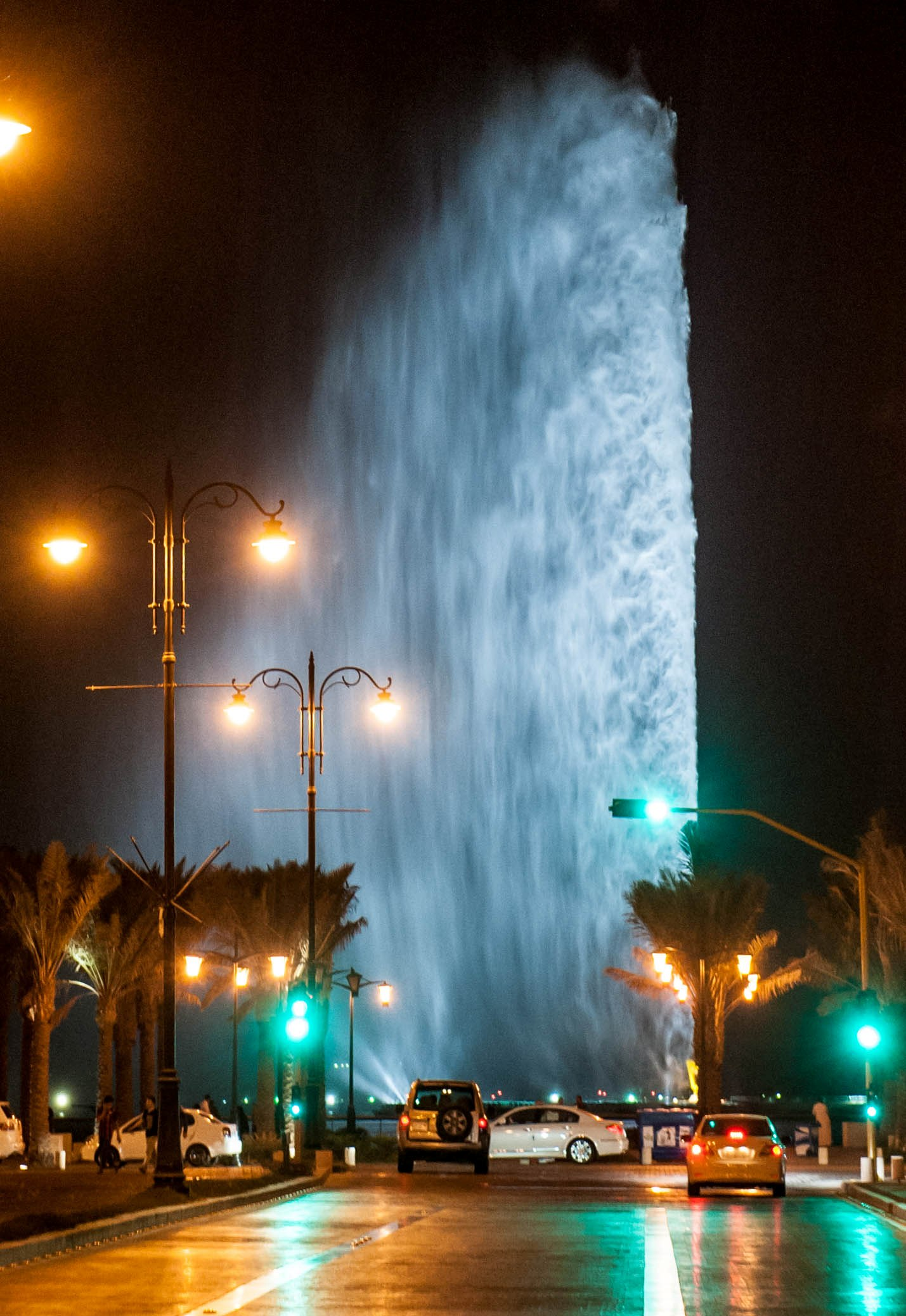
View of King Fahd’s Fountain from the streets of Jeddah

The base of the fountain is shaped like a large mabkhara, and King Fahd’s Fountain is listed in the Guinness World Records as the tallest water fountain in the world.

The fountain is visible throughout the vicinity of Jeddah. The water ejected can reach a speed of 375 km/h (233 mph) and its airborne mass can exceed 16 tonnes (18 short tons). The fountain uses saltwater taken from the Red Sea instead of freshwater. Over 500 LED spotlights illuminate the fountain at night.

== See also ==
- List of things named after Saudi kings
