= King Khalid Royal Reserve =

Nature reserve in northeastern Riyadh, Saudi Arabia

King Khalid Royal Reserve محمية الملك خالد الملكية
- Thumamah Park متنزه الثمامة
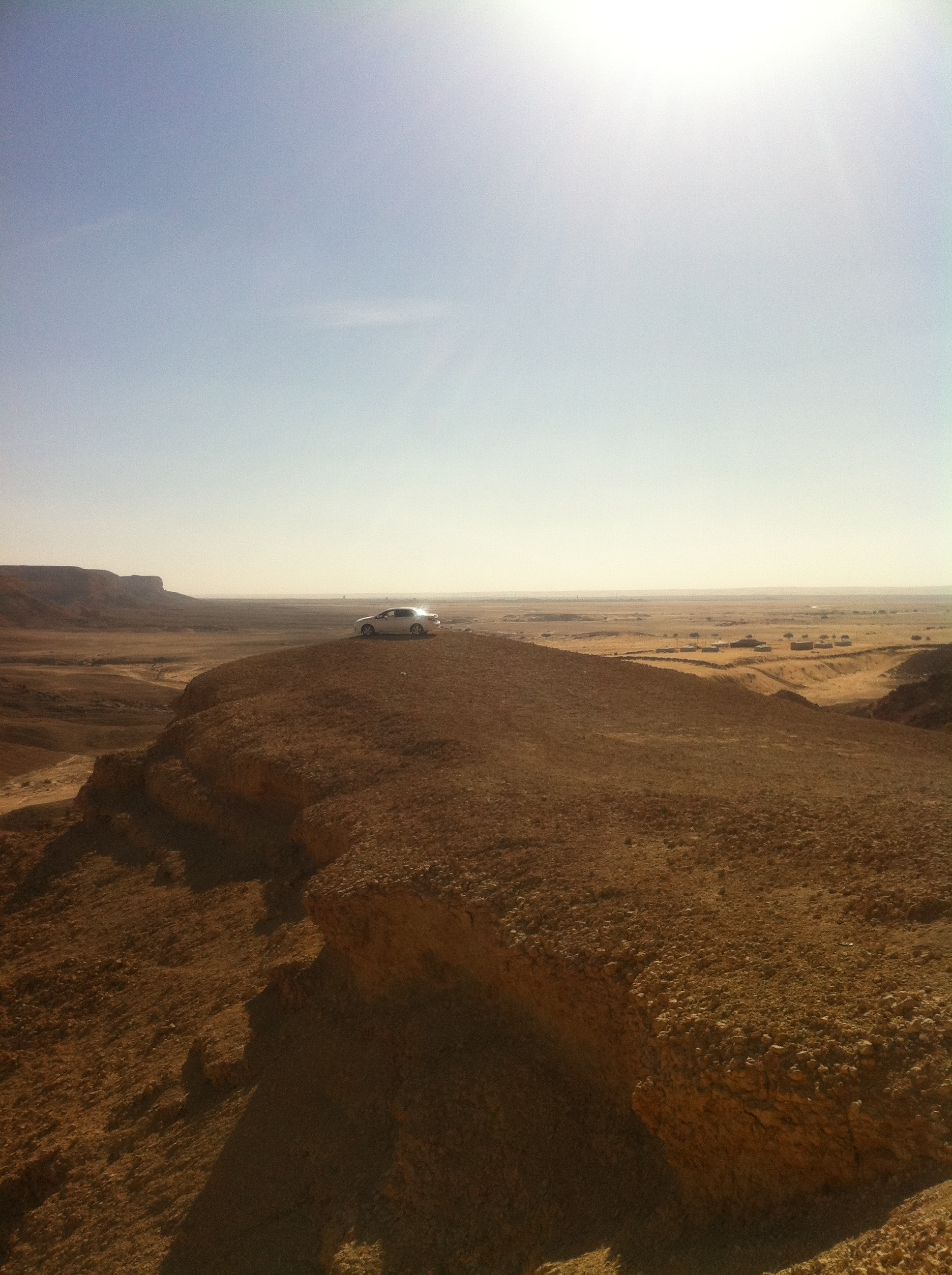
- Thumamah National Park (now King Khalid Royal Reserve), 2011
- Interactive map of King Khalid Royal Reserve محمية الملك خالد الملكية
- Location: Riyadh Province, Saudi Arabia
- Nearest city: Riyadh
- Coordinates: 25°19′10″N 46°41′10″E
- Established: 02 August 1983; 42 years ago

King Khalid Royal Reserve (Arabic: محمية الملك خالد الملكية), formerly as al-Thumamah Wildlife Park (Arabic: متنزه الثمامة البري) and better known as al-Thumamah Park, is a nature reserve and a popular outdoor tourist attraction in the al-Thumamah region of northeastern Riyadh, Saudi Arabia. It was a private farm owned by King Khalid and was partially turned into a public park after its nationalization by the Saudi government under King Fahd in 1983 following the former's death in 1982. It was renamed as the King Khalid Royal Reserve in October 2019 after its recognition as a protected area through a royal decree by King Salman.

== History ==
Prior to its nationalization by the Saudi government in 1983, the park was a private farm owned by the late King Khalid. Following his death in 1982, the newly crowned monarch of Saudi Arabia, King Fahd issued a royal decree for nationalization of the property. The then governor of Riyadh Prince Salman tasked the High Commission for the Development of Arriyadh to transform the farm into a public park. Around 1992, both the Al Thumamah Wildlife Park and the Thumamah National Park projects were merged under the responsibility of High Commission for the Development of Arriyadh. In October 2019, King Salman issued a royal decree which officially declared the area as a natural reserve and was renamed as the King Khalid Royal Reserve.

== See also ==
- Geography of Saudi Arabia
- Red Sand (Riyadh)
- Thumamah Airport
