= King Abdulaziz Manakh Park =

Park in Riyadh, Saudi Arabia

- Pearl of Gardens
- منتزه مناخ الملك عبد العزيز
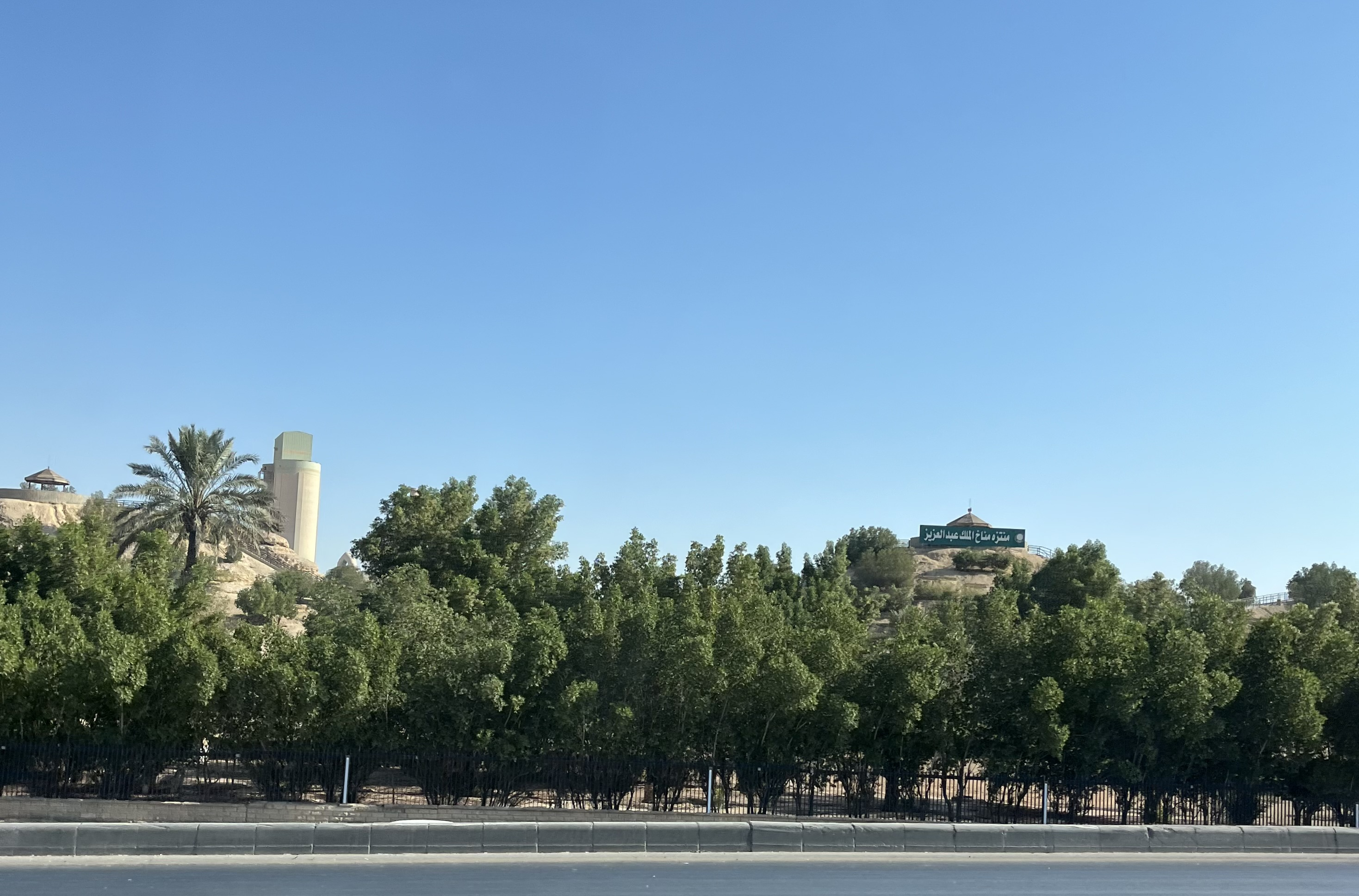
- King Abdulaziz Manakh Park, 2024
- Interactive map of King Abdulaziz Manakh Park
- Location: Riyadh, Saudi Arabia
- Coordinates: 24°37′2″N 46°46′20″E
- Area: 24 hectares (59 acres)
- Opened: 13 September 2005; 20 years ago

King Abdulaziz Manakh Park (Arabic: منتزه مناخ الملك عبد العزيز), simply shortened to al-Manakh Park (Arabic: منتزه مناخ) and also known as the Pearl of Gardens (Arabic: درة الحدائق), is a public park in the Manakh district of Riyadh, Saudi Arabia, located next to the Al Yamamah Cement Factory. It was originally built around the 1980s and reopened in 2005, covering an area of almost 59 acres. Named after King Abdulaziz ibn Saud, the park mostly gets frequented by families on weekends and on holidays during Eid al-Fitr, Eid al-Adha and Saudi National Day.

== Overview ==
The park was originally built around the 1980s but was later closed to the general public by the Riyadh Municipality, following which it was kept under constant maintenance and renovation. By mid-2005, the park prepared itself to be reopened in September 2005 by Prince Abdulaziz bin Mohammed bin Ayyaf, the-then mayor of Riyadh. Al Riyadh reported that within a week after its inauguration, the park received over 20 thousand visitors.

In 2009, Riyadh Municipality held several events at the park during the Eid holidays, such as the Telematch-based game competition for children. The park hosted a wide range of entertainment and cultural activities during the Eid holidays in 2010. In 2011, the Saudi National Day celebrations were organized by the Riyadh Municipality in the park, followed by similar Eid al-Fitr celebrations the next year in 2012.
