= Networks of Mediterranean Youth =

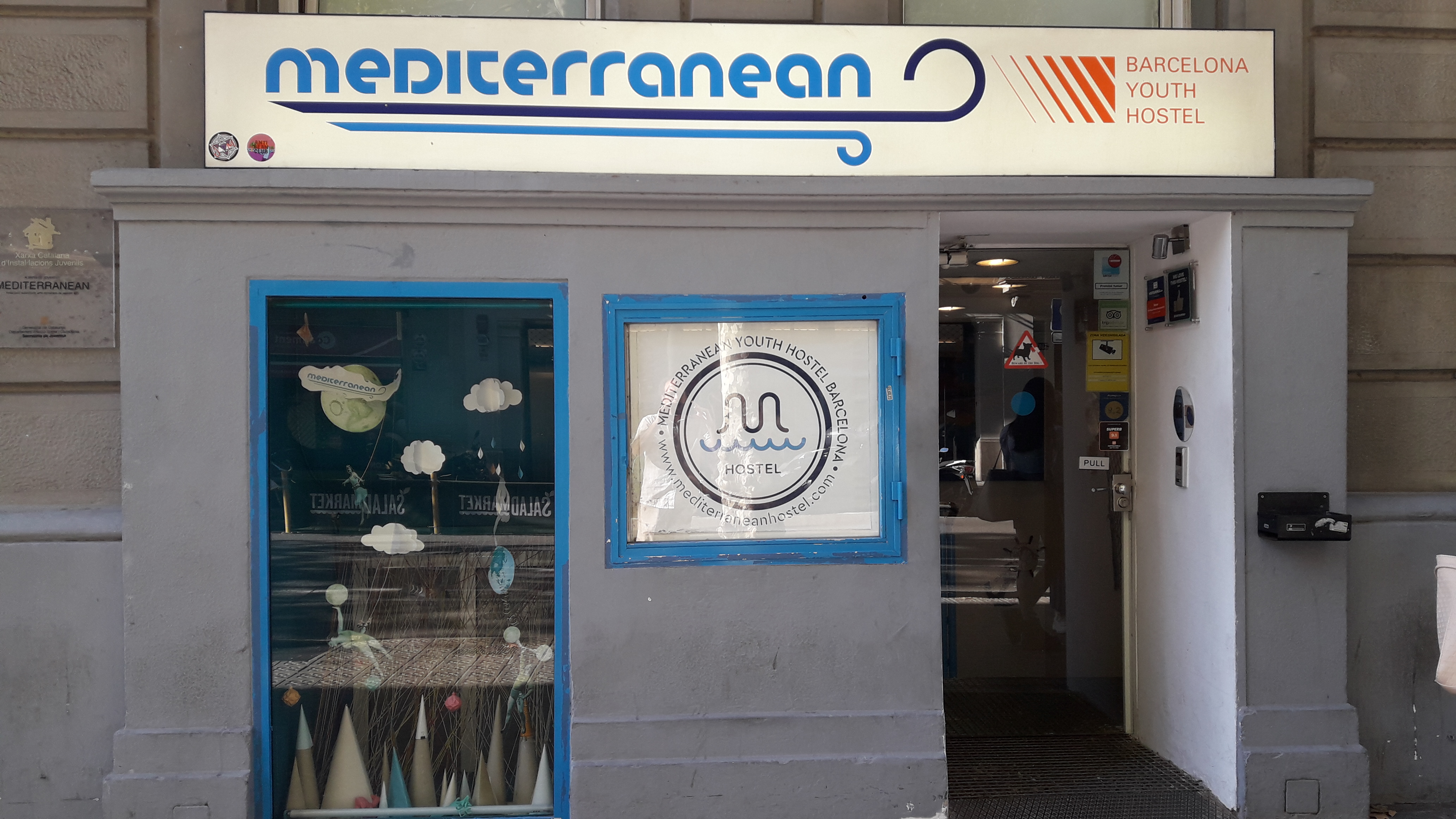
Mediterranean youth

The Networks of Mediterranean Youth (NET-MED Youth) (2014-2017) was a three-year project implemented by UNESCO and funded by the European Union for young people in the Mediterranean area of Europe.

== Goal ==
Networks of Mediterranean Youth, Its goals were to improve youth employment and youth civic participation by empowering youth organizations to deal with national governments national media and regional media.

== Beneficiaries ==
- Youth organizations from 10 countries along the eastern and western basins of the Mediterranean Sea
- Youth, skills development and employment stakeholders (ministries, public institutions, social partners, and others)
- Media professionals, citizen journalists and bloggers

== Reason for NET-MED ==
The project came as a response to the common challenges shared by Southern Mediterranean countries related to the social inclusion of youth. These include, among others, disinterest in civic engagement; insufficient representation in public and political spheres, as well as in mainstream media; high unemployment and a particularly weak participation of women in the labour market.

== Focus areas of NET-MED ==
- Dynamic mappings of youth organizations
- National consultative working groups on key themes: Public Policy on Youth, Youth and Media, Youth and Employment
- Situational analysis of youth and national stakeholders, including legal and political frameworks
- Capacity building among youth organizations and ministries
- Formulation of and advocacy for national action plans on youth
- Monitoring of youth's representation in media, and surveying of youth's opinion about media
- Outreach actions fostering youth-friendly, inclusive, objective and fair media coverage
- Trainings and resources to promote freedom of expression, media and information literacy, production of media content by youth
- Capacity building among young journalists, bloggers and citizen journalists
- National and regional situational analysis reports on labour market, youth transition and data availability challenges
- Development of tools for skills anticipation in close collaboration with national stakeholders
- Capacity building among youth organizations for better involvement of youth in evidence-based policy design.
