= Wadi Thumamah =

Valley in Saudi Arabia

Wadi al-Thumamah (Arabic: وادي الثمامة) is a wadi (valley) located approximately 90 kilometers northeast of Riyadh in Riyadh Governorate, Saudi Arabia. It descends from the Al-Armah mountains and passes through Ghilanah village and ends at Rawdat Khuraim in Ramah Governorate of Riyadh Province. The valley is 60 km long and has an average slope of 3 min/km. It is named after Thumam (Arabic: الثمام), the Arabic word for desert bunchgrass.
