= British International School of Jeddah =

The British International School of Jeddah

Location
- Jeddah; Saudi Arabia; 21°38′46″N 39°7′25″E

Information
- Type: Private
- Established: 1977
- Director: Helen Olds
- Grades: Nursery to Year 13 (IB2)
- Gender: Co-educational
- Enrollment: 1400
- Language: English
- Website: bis-jeddah.com

The British International School of Jeddah (also known as BISJ, The Continental School, Conti) is an international co-educational school established in 1977 in Jeddah, Saudi Arabia.

The Continental School (officially known as the British International School, Jeddah) offers a British-style international curriculum to boys and girls from Pre-school to IB (International Baccalaureate) (approximately pre-K to Grade 12) levels. Patronage is offered by some 20 embassies. The medium of instruction is English (as well as Arabic, French and Spanish in their respective classes).

== History ==
In the late 1970s, there existed in Jeddah an American school and a British preparatory school. The prep school only admitted holders of British or Dutch passports, and it had been founded under the auspices of those two embassies, which were located in Jeddah at that time. A group of families decided to take the initiative and to start their own school with the support of the British and Belgian Embassies. The school was named the Continental School as it was expected to have the flavour of Continental Europe. The school was inaugurated on 1 October 1977 as a "villa school", with the declared aim of providing a high-quality education for the expatriate community in Jeddah. Over time, the school expanded, with a change in premises and expansion of the student body.

In 1996, the name of the school was changed by order of the Ministry of Education to the British International School of Jeddah. Unofficially, the 'Conti' continues to be the preferred name used by many in the community.

== Curriculum ==
The educational syllabus is British in style, however, it has been modified to meet students' requirements. The school offers a full-time day school program for boys and girls from pre-school age up till the secondary high school level. BISJ is also an accredited IB World School. It offers the IPC in the Primary School and the International Baccalaureate Diploma Programme for year 12 and 13 (Grades 11 and 12). In years 10 and 11 (Grades 9 and 10) students follow a curriculum which prepares them for the International General Certificate of Secondary Education (IGCSE) examination which is externally marked by Cambridge International Examinations (CIE).

On completing Year 9 at the Continental School, students prepare for the International General Certificate of Secondary Education through Cambridge International Examinations (IGCSE exams). After completing their IGCSE students may then apply to continue at the school in the IB programme for a further two years or move on to many destinations worldwide, including public and private universities and colleges in the UK, the USA, and the Middle East.

The British International School of Jeddah's terms are similar to the three terms of the UK system, with some flexibility to accommodate both Islamic and Western calendars. With slight variations, the school week is from Sunday to Thursday, and the day runs from 08:00 to 15:10, with many weekly afternoon clubs and activities to choose from.

Students in secondary school are required to take a foreign language: Arabic, French, or Spanish.

== Accreditation ==
In its original form as 'The Continental School' it was accredited by the European Council of International Schools (ECIS) in 1990, the first British-style school worldwide to achieve this status. It gained re-accreditation by the Council of International Schools (CIS) as 'The British International School of Jeddah' in 2002 and again in 2012. It is also accredited by the New England Association of Schools and Colleges (NEASC) and is an accredited member of British Schools in the Middle East (BSME).

BISJ is an International Baccalaureate World School, and also a member of the Cambridge International Examinations: Excellence in Education.

== Campus and facilities ==
The campus is 15 kilometres (9.3 mi) north of the city centre.

Housed on a purpose-built campus, the school has three separate sections, the Lower Primary School, the Upper Primary School and the Upper School, in addition to the Administration block. Each school has its own individual buildings, play areas and administration. The Upper School has an additional International Baccalaureate Block and Language Block, making up to a total of 90 rooms, two music rooms (one equipped with a recording studio), eight science laboratories, and four computer rooms. The shared facilities include a large sports hall, the Russ Law Hall (which includes a stage and sound booth), a gymnasium, a multi-purpose hall, a cafeteria, three libraries, a clinic, two pools and an outside sports area with running circuit and 100m sprint track. Additional facilities have recently been constructed.

== Students and faculty ==
As of 2012, BISJ has over 1,531 students; 15% of the students were Saudis, 13% were British, 12% were Egyptians, 10% each were Americans and Lebanese, and the remainder come from about 55 countries. The staff is in excess of 240 from more than 20 countries.

== See also ==
- King Fahad Academy - Saudi school in London
- List of schools in Saudi Arabia
