= Festival du Livre de Paris =

The Festival du Livre de Paris (Paris Book Festival), known as Livre Paris prior to 2021 and originally the Salon du livre de Paris is an international fair open to the public, dedicated to books and, more broadly, the written word and media.

Established in 1981 by the National Publishing Union (SNE), it was co-managed by Paris Livres Événements (an SNE subsidiary) and Reed Expositions France, before coming under the sole management of Paris Livres Événements starting in 2022. Over the course of three days in 2024, the event hosted 350 publishing houses and 102,000 visitors, with 90,000 books sold.

In the early 21st century, various controversies regarding the presence or absence of certain figures or nationalities prompted several publishing groups to boycott the fair and sparked protests within the event itself. Publishers were also deterred by the "exorbitant cost of stands."

In 2020 and 2021, it was cancelled due to the COVID-19 pandemic.
