= Ecole Supérieure Roi Fahd de Traduction =

Translation school in Tangier, Morocco

The Ecole Supérieure Roi Fahd de Traduction (ESRFT, "King Fahd School of Translation", Arabic: مدرسة الملک فهد العلیا للترجمة) is a translation and interpreting school located in Tangier, Morocco.

== History and operations ==
The school was established in Tangier in 1986 in an attempt to regularize the training of translators in this multilingual region. Before then, specialized centres for training translators did not exist in the Arab world.

== See also ==
- List of things named after Saudi kings
