= King Saud University College of Medicine =

King Saud University, College of Medicine
- جامعة الملك سعود, كلية الطب
- Type: Public
- Established: 1967
- Dean: Prof. Fahad Abdullah Al Zamil
- Location: Riyadh, Saudi Arabia
- Website: www.medicine.ksu.edu.sa

The College of Medicine in King Saud University was established as the first medical college in the Kingdom in 1967. One year later, King Abdul-Aziz University Hospital, became affiliated with the college and subsequently in 1981, King Khalid University Hospital and the new college building were established to become the main teaching campus and patient service facility. To date, the college has graduated more than 4000 undergraduate students, 200 postgraduates students, and more than 700 graduates from different medical specialties fellowship programs.

== History ==
King Saud University's College of Medicine was established in 1967 during the reign of King Faisal. Actual studies began in 1969. The choice of members for the Teaching Board and the supervision of exams until 1978 were done cooperatively between the faculty and the University of London. In 1974/1975, the College opened a special department for female students and incorporated the Ministry of Health's Prince ts name was changed to King Abdulaziz University Hospital to be utilized for training male and female students in the clinical stage. At the 25th anniversary of inauguration of King Saud University 1981, the building of College of Medicine and King Khalid University Hospital were inaugurated for teaching and health services. The college has also made agreements with different universities in America, Canada and U.K. to support this Academic Board in the college and to train graduate Saudi doctors, as well as to provide preparation for their higher studies and specialization in different medical disciplines.

== Research ==
They have had recent interest in scientific research at all levels in the country starting from the government to the University administration and finally from the Deanship of Medical College.

== Hospitals ==
=== King Abdulaziz University Hospital ===
The first university Hospital was King Abdulaziz University Hospital which was founded in 1956 but only got affiliated to the college in 1976. This facility now specializes in ENT and ophthalmology. These two departments are among the largest in the Middle East in these specialties. They host skilled physicians in all subspecialties of ENT and ophthalmology as well as world class researchers. In addition, it contains some general medical and pediatric services as well as the university diabetes center. All care is free of charge for all King Saud University staff and students. The hospital provides primary and secondary care services for Saudi patients from Northern Riyadh area. It also provides tertiary care services to all Saudi citizens on referral basis.

=== King Khalid University Hospital ===
In 1982, a dedicated university hospital was opened and was named King Khalid University Hospital. This facility is an 850-bed facility with all general and subspecialty medical services. It contains a special outpatient building, more than 20 operating rooms, and a fully equipped and staffed laboratory, radiology, and pharmacy services in addition to all other supporting services. The hospital provides primary and secondary care services for Saudi patients from Northern Riyadh area. It also provides tertiary care services to all Saudi citizens on referral bases. All care is free of charge for all King Saud University staff and students.

== Undergraduate ==
The college offers Bachelor of Medicine, Bachelor of Surgery degree(M.B.B.S.).After high-school students can join King Saud university preparatory year college, after passing first year with the required GPA, they can join the medical school.

== Postgraduate ==
The college offers 43 accredited postgraduate training programs (4 programs in process). The duration of training varies from 1 to 5 years. There are currently approximately 315 trainees, including residents, fellows, and international trainees.

== Departments ==
All basic sciences are represented as well as all clinical disciplines. Most departments also have divisions representing different specialties. Most departments supervise both academic and clinical functions of the discipline as well as all related research activities. In addition, a fully staffed Medical Education department supports all teaching and learning issues as well as supervise the skills lab.

- Medical Education
- Anatomy
- Anesthesia
- Cardiac Sciences
- Dermatology
- Emergency Medicine
- ENT
- Family & Community Medicine
- Medicine
- OBS-Gynecology
- Ophthalmology
- Orthopedics
- Pathology
- Pediatrics
- Pharmacology
- Psychiatry
- Physiology
- Radiology
- Surgery
- Critical Care

== Notable alumni ==
Notable alumni

- Abdullah bin Abdulaziz Al Rabiah - Minister of Health.
- Yazeed Abdul Rahman al-Ohali - Director of the Hospitals at the Ministry of Health.
- Tawfik Ahmed Khoja - GM of health centers at the ministry of health.
- Mohammed Hassan Mufti - Hospital Director of public security forces hospital.
- Sultan Abdullah Bahebri - Executive Director of King Faisal Specialist Hospital and Research Centre, Jeddah.
- Muhammad Hamza Khchim - Director of King Khaled Hospital.

== See also ==
- List of things named after Saudi kings
