= Al Thumamah (Riyadh) =

Desert area in northeastern fringes of Riyadh, Saudi Arabia

Al-Thumamah الثمامة
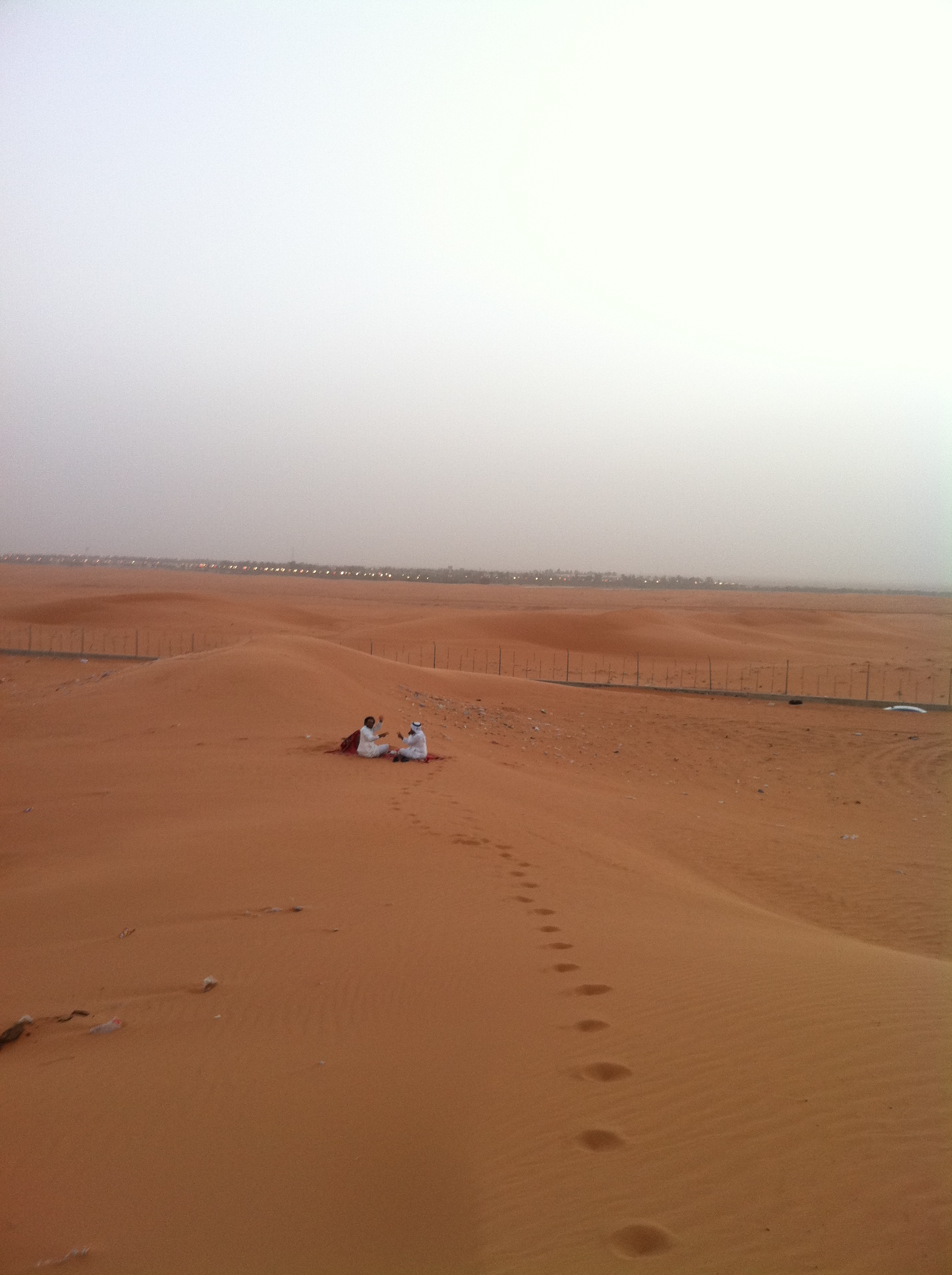
- Al-Thumamah, 2013

- Location within Saudi Arabia
- Coordinates: 25.25141°N 46.63067°E
- Country: Saudi Arabia
- Province: Riyadh Region
- First settled: Around 8,000 BC to 3,000 BC (Neolithic period)

Area
  - Total: 2.1 km^{2} (0.81 sq mi)

Al-Thumamah (Arabic: الثمامة, romanized: ath-Thumāmah, lit. 'the blade of grass'), alternatively spelt as al-Thumama and pronounced as ath-Thumamah, is an arid lowland desert area situated in Wadi Thumamah at the edge of al-Armah mountains in the northeastern fringes of Riyadh in Riyadh Governorate, Saudi Arabia. Named after thumam (Arabic: الثمام), the Arabic word for desert bunchgrass, it is located approximately 50 miles (80 km) from Riyadh and is known for hosting outdoor recreational places, most notably the Thumamah National Park. The first census of the area was conducted in 1981 during the reign of King Khalid.

== Archaeological findings ==
Recent archaeological excavations in the area trace the settlement's early existence to almost 8000 years ago, during the Neolithic period.

== Landmarks ==
- Thumamah National Park
