= King Salman Mosque =

Mosque in Malé, Maldives

- Dhivehi: ސަލްމާން ރަސްގެފާނު މިސްކިތް
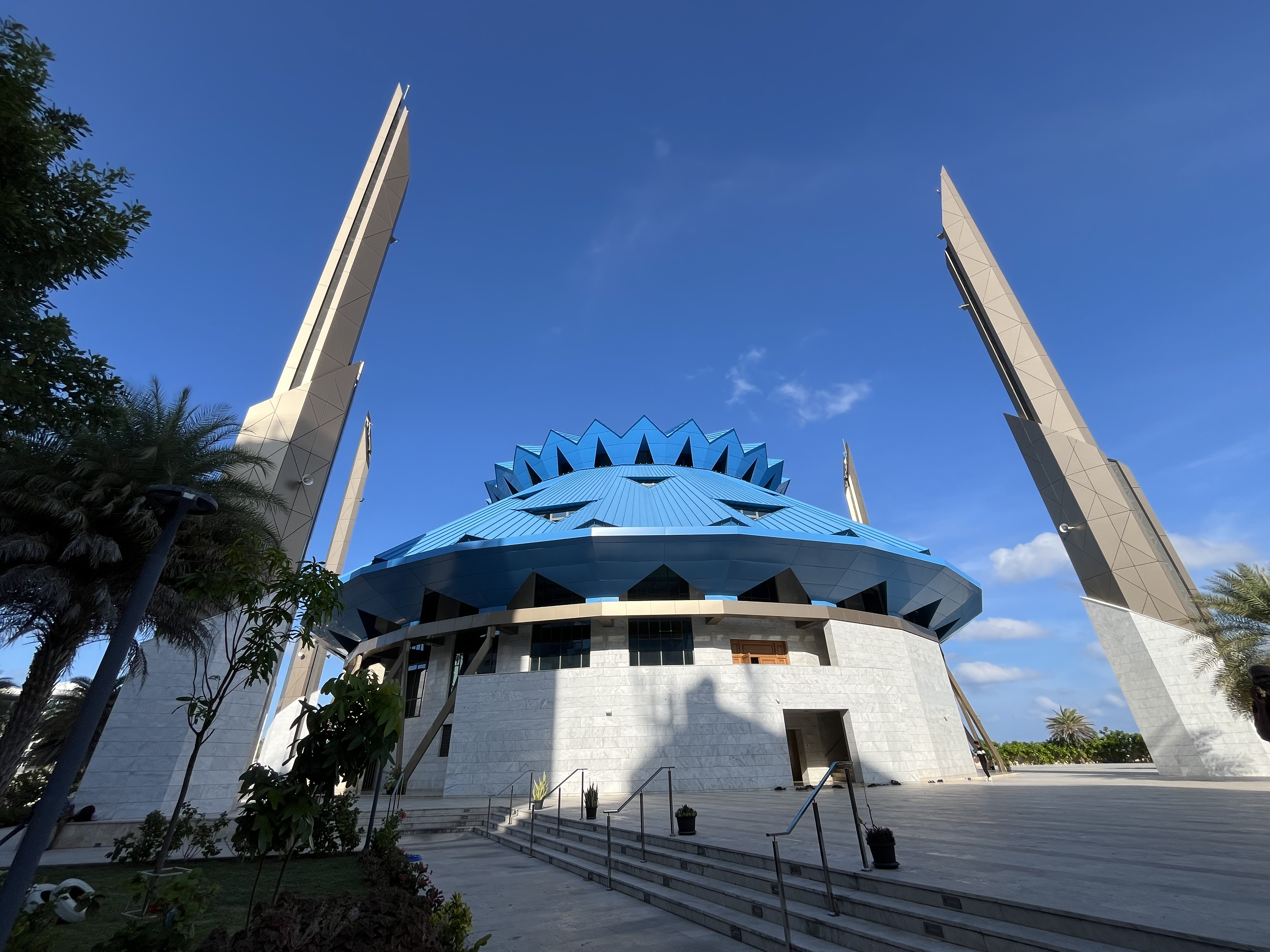
- The mosque in 2024

- Location of the mosque in the Maldives

Religion
- Affiliation: Sunni Islam
- Ecclesiastical or organizational status: Mosque
- Status: Active

Location
- Location: Malé
- Country: Maldives
- Interactive map of King Salman Mosque
- Coordinates: 4°10′32.4″N 73°31′06.6″E

Architecture
- Type: Mosque architecture
- Style: Contemporary
- Funded by: Kingdom of Saudi Arabia
- General contractor: Turkmaks Alke (Turkey)
- Groundbreaking: 2017
- Completed: 2022
- Construction cost: c. US$24 million (Rf. 370 million)

Specifications
- Capacity: 10,000 worshippers
- Dome: 1
- Minaret: 5
- Site area: 10,000 m^{2} (110,000 sq ft)

The King Salman Mosque (Dhivehi: ސަލްމާން ރަސްގެފާނު މިސްކިތް; Arabic: مسجد الملك سلمان) is a Sunni Islam mosque, located on the eastern side of Boduthakurufaanu Magu and close to the Artificial Beach in the capital Malé, Republic of Maldives. With capacity for 10,000 worshippers, it is considerably one of the largest mosque in the Indian Ocean.

The construction of the mosque was funded in part by the Kingdom of Saudi Arabia and it is named after King Salman.

== History ==
The mosque was planned to commemorate the 50th anniversary of the independence of the Maldives. The construction of the mosque began in 2018. The opening of the mosque was scheduled in 2021, but was delayed as the structure remains unfinished. The mosque opened unofficially for prayers in April 2022. The official opening is yet to be announced. In May 2024 the Islamic Minister, Dr Mohamed Shaheem Ali Saeed, advised that Rf. 6 million was needed in order to fix air conditioning issues in the building; and that the official opening was delayed until the funds could be secured.

== Architecture ==
The six-storeyed mosque building is flanked by five minarets, representing the five pillars of Islam. The building lacks a traditional dome. Instead, the dome-like structure is designed to resemble a Bedouin desert tent in the Maldivian vernacular roof structure style.

The mosque complex also includes a library, an auditorium, classrooms, and a multi-purpose hall.

== See also ==
- Islam in the Maldives
- List of mosques in the Maldives
