= King Fahd Road =

Road in Jeddah, Saudi Arabia

King Fahd Road (Sitteen Street)
- Length: 20 km (12 mi)
- northbound end: Al Nuzha Road
- southbound end: Al Andalus Road

King Fahd Road, also known as Sitteen Street, is a major traffic artery running through Jeddah, Saudi Arabia.

== Route ==
The northern terminus of King Fahd Road begins from Al Nuzha Road on the southern edge of King Abdulaziz International Airport. Afterwards, it continues south intersection through the Al Nuzha, Al Faisaliyah, Aziziyah, Mishrifah, and Sharafiyah neighbourhoods. Originally, the road ended at King Khalid Road which led to the old Jeddah International Airport. The southern terminus of King Fahd Road begins at Al Andalus Street beside the Jeddah Islamic Port. Afterwards, it ran through the Al Hindawiya district, popular for hosting large open-air Yemeni markets. It was known as the Souk Al-Yumanah Markets, which existed since the late 1940s.

== Transportation ==
King Fahd Road serves multiple bus routes for the Saudi Public Transport Company, all of which end at the Bin Laden Mosque. Line 8 commences at the Security Forces Hospital and runs every 20 minutes (15 on Friday morning and 30 on Friday afternoon). Line 9 commences at the Periodic Inspection Terminal and runs every 15 minutes (30 on Friday afternoon). Line 9B also commences at the same terminal and runs every 15 minutes (20 on Friday morning and 35 on Friday afternoon).

== History ==
When Sitteen Street was first built, its name was directly taken from the Arabic spelling of sixty, as it had a width of 60 meters. In 1979, construction began of an extension beyond the southern terminus at King Khalid Road. It was completed in 1981, running south between the Al-Ammariyah and Al-Kandarah neighbourhoods, turning west at Al-Sabeel and ending at Al Andalus Road in Al-Hindawiya. The extension also included two 40-metre wide flyovers, becoming the center of Jeddah northward and southward traffic flow. In 1994, an extension was made at Al Ahsa, aimed at removing eastbound traffic from the Sitteen Street intersection with the Makkah Road frontage roads.

=== Modern improvements ===
In 2012, major improvements for King Fahd Road began, under the Jeddah Urban Development Plan directed by HM King Abdullah. This led to the removal of Bicycle (Darraja) Square and its art installation to make way for an overpass. In January 2014, the expansion works received a major funding of $103.7 million under the plan. As the road was congested, especially at Nuzha district, roundabouts and traffic signals were removed to singularly flow traffic. The project led to the development of a 750-meter underpass at Al-Falak Square, and a 583-metre-long elevated bridge spanning across Al-Rawda Street with three lanes on each side at Al-Darraja Square.

On January 18, 2015, Jeddah Mayor Hank Aburas inaugurated an overpass over Hera Street and Prince Sultan Bin Salman Street. The bridge measured 2.4 kilometers, becoming one of the longest in the city to ever be built.
