= Council of Ministers of Saudi Arabia =

Cabinet and highest executive body of Saudi Arabia

- مجلس الوزراء السعودي
- Emblem of Saudi Arabia
- Formation: 9 October 1953; 73 years ago
- Legal status: Constitutional executive body
- Location: Al-Yamamah Palace (Riyadh); Al-Salam Palace (Jeddah)
- Prime Minister: Mohammed bin Salman
- Head of State: King Salman
- Membership: Prime Minister, ministers with portfolio, and ministers of state
- Website: www.my.gov.sa

The Council of Ministers (Arabic: مجلس الوزراء) is the cabinet and highest executive body of the Government of Saudi Arabia. It is chaired by the prime minister, a position traditionally held by either the king or the crown prince. Since 27 September 2022, the council has been chaired by Crown Prince Mohammed bin Salman.

== History ==
The Council of Ministers was established by King Abdulaziz in 1953. It is responsible for "drafting and overseeing the implementation of the internal, external, financial, economic, educational and defense policies, and general affairs of the state." It functions in accordance with the Basic Law of Saudi Arabia and is advised by the Consultative Assembly. Legislation must be ratified by a royal decree. It meets every Tuesday and is chaired by the crown prince in his capacity as Prime Minister or one of his deputies. It is the final authority for financial, executive and administrative matters. Its resolutions are non-binding unless agreed upon by a majority vote. In case of a tie, the Prime Minister casts the tie-breaking vote. The present law governing the form and function of the Council of Ministers was issued by King Fahd in 1993. Among others, it stipulates that every member of the Council must be "a Saudi national by birth and descent; well-known for righteousness and capability;" and "not previously convicted for a crime of immorality or dishonor."

In the early hours of 29 April 2015, King Salman issued 25 royal decrees which included a cabinet reshuffle. This included the removal of his brother Muqrin bin Abdulaziz as Crown Prince and appointment of his nephew Muhammad bin Nayef. The king appointed his son Mohammed bin Salman as Deputy Crown Prince.

In another reshuffle on 21 June 2017, King Salman removed his nephew as Crown Prince and appointed his son, Mohammed bin Salman, as the new Crown Prince.

== Membership ==
Current members
Office	Officeholder	Assumed office
Executive leadership
Prime Minister	Mohammed bin Salman	27 September 2022
Ministers
Minister of Defense	Khalid bin Salman	27 September 2022
Minister of National Guard	Abdullah bin Bandar	27 December 2018
Minister of Interior	Abdulaziz bin Saud	21 June 2017
Minister of Foreign Affairs	Faisal bin Farhan	23 October 2019
Minister of Islamic Affairs	Abdullatif Al-Sheikh	2 June 2018
Minister of Education	Yousef Al-Benyan	27 September 2022
Minister of Justice	Walid Al-Samaani	23 January 2015
Minister of Energy	Abdulaziz bin Salman	8 September 2019
Minister of Industry and Mineral Resources	Abdulaziz bin Salman	11 July 2026
Minister of Transport and Logistic Services	Saleh bin Nasser	23 October 2019
Minister of Commerce	Majid Al-Qasabi	7 May 2016
Minister of Investment	Fahd Al-Saif	12 February 2026
Minister of Economy and Planning	Faisal F. Alibrahim	3 May 2021
Minister of Health	Fahad Al-Jalajel	15 October 2021
Minister of Media	Salman bin Yousuf	5 March 2023
Minister of Finance	Mohammed Al-Jadaan	1 November 2016
Minister of Culture	Badr bin Abdullah	2 June 2018
Minister of Environment, Water and Agriculture	Abdulrahman Al-Fadhli	7 May 2016
Minister of Hajj and Umrah	Tawfig Al-Rabiah	15 October 2021
Minister of Communications and Information Technology	Abdullah Al-Swaha	23 April 2017
Minister of Municipalities and Housing	Majed Al-Hogail	25 February 2020
Minister of Human Resources and Social Development	Ahmed Al-Rajhi	2 June 2018
Minister of Sport	Abdulaziz Al-Faisal	25 February 2020
Minister of Tourism	Ahmed Al-Khateeb	25 February 2020
Ministers of State
Minister of State for Foreign Affairs	Adel al-Jubeir	27 December 2018
Minister of State for Gulf Affairs	Thamer Al-Sabhan	16 October 2016
Minister of State for Shura Affairs	Issam bin Saad bin Saeed	14 January 2022
Minister of State	Mohammad Al-Sheikh	29 January 2015
Minister of State	Khalid Al-Eissa	29 April 2015
Minister of State	Musaad Al-Aiban	2 August 1995
Minister of State	Mansour bin Mutaib	29 January 2015
Minister of State	Saleh Al-Sheikh	2 June 2018
Minister of State	Ibrahim Al-Assaf	23 October 2019
Minister of State	Turki bin Mohammed	27 September 2018
Minister of State	Hamad Al-Sheikh	27 September 2022
Minister of State	Bandar Al-Khorayef	11 July 2026

== See also ==
- Saudi Royal Court
- List of Saudi rulers
- King of Saudi Arabia
- Ministries of Saudi Arabia
- Government of Saudi Arabia
- Crown Prince of Saudi Arabia
- Prime Minister of Saudi Arabia
- Council of Political and Security Affairs
- Council of Economic and Development Affairs
