= Ministries of Saudi Arabia =

This is a list of ministries of the Government of Saudi Arabia.

== List of ministries ==
| No. | Ministry | Minister | Founded | Website |
|---|---|---|---|---|
| 1 | Ministry of Communications and Information Technology وزارة الاتصالات وتقنية المعلومات | Abdullah Alswaha | 1926 | www.mcit.gov.sa/en/ |
| 2 | Ministry of Interior وزارة الداخلية | Abdulaziz bin Saud | 1926 | www.moi.gov.sa |
| 3 | Ministry of Foreign Affairs وزارة الخارجية | Faisal bin Farhan | 1930 | www.mofa.gov.sa/en |
| 4 | Ministry of Finance وزارة المالية | Mohammed Al-Jadaan | 1932 | www.mof.gov.sa/en |
| 5 | Ministry of Defense وزارة الدفاع | Khalid bin Salman | 1943 | mod.gov.sa |
| 6 | Ministry of Hajj and Umrah وزارة الحج والعمرة | Tawfig Al-Rabiah | 1945 | www.haj.gov.sa/Home |
| 7 | Ministry of National Guard وزارة الحرس الوطني | Abdullah bin Bandar | 1947 | www.sang.gov.sa |
| 8 | Ministry of Health وزارة الصحة | Fahad Al-Jalajel | 1951 | www.moh.gov.sa/en/ |
| 9 | Ministry of Environment, Water and Agriculture وزارة البيئة والمياه والزراعة | Abdulrahman Al-Fadhli | 1953 | www.mewa.gov.sa/en/ |
| 10 | Ministry of Transport and Logistic Services وزارة النقل والخدمات اللوجستية | Saleh Al-Jasser | 1953 | www.mot.gov.sa/en |
| 11 | Ministry of Education وزارة التعليم | Yousef Al-Benyan | 1953 | www.moe.gov.sa/en/ |
| 12 | Ministry of Commerce وزارة التجارة | Majid Al-Qasabi | 1954 | mc.gov.sa/en |
| 13 | Ministry of Energy وزارة الطاقة | Abdulaziz bin Salman | 1960 | www.moenergy.gov.sa/en/ |
| 14 | Ministry of Human Resources and Social Development وزارة الموارد البشرية والتنمية الاجتماعية | Ahmed Al-Rajhi | 1961 | www.hrsd.gov.sa/en |
| 15 | Ministry of Justice وزارة العدل | Walid al-Samaani | 1962 | www.moj.gov.sa/english |
| 16 | Ministry of Economy and Planning وزارة الاقتصاد والتخطيط | Faisal F. Alibrahim | 1975 | www.mep.gov.sa/en |
| 17 | Ministry of Municipalities and Housing وزارة البلديات و الإسكان | Majid Al-Hogail | 1975 | momah.gov.sa/en |
| 18 | Ministry of Islamic Affairs, Dawah and Guidance وزارة الشؤون الإسلامية والدعوة والإرشاد | Abdullatif Al-Sheikh | 1993 | www.moia.gov.sa |
| 19 | Ministry of Culture وزارة الثقافة | Bader bin Abdullah | 2018 | www.moc.gov.sa/en |
| 20 | Ministry of Media وزارة الإعلام | Salman bin Yousuf | 2018 | media.gov.sa/en |
| 21 | Ministry of Industry and Mineral Resources وزارة الصناعة والثروة المعدنية | Bandar Al-Khorayef | 2019 | mim.gov.sa/en/ |
| 22 | Ministry of Investment وزارة الاستثمار | Fahd Al-Saif | 2020 | misa.gov.sa/en/ |
| 23 | Ministry of Sport وزارة الرياضة | Abdulaziz Al-Faisal | 2020 | mos.gov.sa/en |
| 24 | Ministry of Tourism وزارة السياحة | Ahmed Al-Khateeb | 2020 | mt.gov.sa |

== Former ministries ==
- Ministry of Higher Education (1975–2015), merged into the Ministry of Education.
- Ministry of War (1744–1934), the former military administration of the First and Second Saudi states.
- Ministry of Civil Service (1999–2020), merged into the Ministry of Human Resources and Social Development.
- Ministry of Social Affairs (1961–2016), merged into the Ministry of Labour and Social Development, which was later renamed the Ministry of Human Resources and Social Development.
- Ministry of Water and Electricity (2002–2016), abolished; its water portfolio was transferred to the Ministry of Environment, Water and Agriculture, and the electricity portfolio was transferred to the Ministry of Energy.
- Ministry of Housing (2011–2021), merged with the Ministry of Municipal and Rural Affairs to form the Ministry of Municipalities and Housing.

== See also ==
- Saudi Royal Court
- List of Saudi rulers
- King of Saudi Arabia
- Government of Saudi Arabia
- Crown Prince of Saudi Arabia
- Prime Minister of Saudi Arabia
- Council of Ministers of Saudi Arabia
