= Mahd Sports Academy =

Sports academy in Saudi Arabia

- أكاديمية مهد الرياضية
- Interactive map of Mahd Sports Academy
- Location: Riyadh, Saudi Arabia
- Coordinates: 24.648537°N 46.649246°E

Construction
- Opened: 27 July 2020; 6 years ago

Website
- mahd.gov.sa/en

Mahd Sports Academy (Arabic: أكاديمية مهد الرياضية, romanized: Akadīmīyyāt Māhd Ar-Riyaḍiyya) is a sports academy based in Riyadh, Saudi Arabia. The academy was officially launched in July 2020 in line with Saudi Arabia's Vision 2030 to develop the sports sector. Mahd aims to scout, help, and train Saudi athletes in various sports that include football, handball, athletics, taekwondo, and gymnastics.

Once complete, Mahd Sports Academy will be among the largest sports academies in the world. The academy is available to Saudi children from ages 6 to 14.

== History ==
Mahd Sports Academy was launched in July 2020 by Saudi minister of sport Abdulaziz bin Turki Al Saud in a press conference held in Riyadh. The ceremony was attended by FIFA president Gianni Infantino and football manager José Mourinho.

The establishment of the academy was approved in June 2021 as per the Council of Ministers Resolution No. (654), with its mandates approved in August 2022 by Council of Ministers Resolution No. (10).

In July 2023, Mahd Academy's board of directors was announced by Saudi Crown Prince Mohammed bin Salman. The board members include José Mourinho, Ioan Lupescu, and Reema bint Bandar with Abdulaziz bin Turki as the chairman.

In May 2025, the academy announced its expansion to all 13 Provinces of Saudi Arabia, opening a total of 16 different branches. The initiative, named “Takween”, was in collaboration with the Ministry of Education.

Following Cristiano Ronaldo's signing with Al Nassr and his relocation to Riyadh, Cristiano Ronaldo Jr. joined the academy where he reportedly trains with an age group two years above him.

== See also ==
- Ministry of Sport (Saudi Arabia)
- Sport in Saudi Arabia
- Saudi Arabian Football Federation
- Saudi Arabia national football team
- Saudi Arabia 2034 FIFA World Cup bid
- Aspire Academy
