= Politics of Saudi Arabia =

Politics of Saudi Arabia سياسة المملكة العربية السعودية
- Emblem of Saudi Arabia
- Polity type: Unitary Islamic absolute monarchy
- Constitution: Basic Law of Saudi Arabia (De facto); The Quran and the Sunnah (De jure) (Note: King Faisal declared the Quran to be the constitution in 1960. In 1992, King Fahd adopted the Basic Law as a constitution-like charter for the country. The Basic Law declares that the Quran and the Sunnah are the constitution of Saudi Arabia.)

Legislative branch
- Name: Consultative Assembly (Note: Serves as an advisory body to the king with no legislative power.)
- Type: Unicameral
- Meeting place: Al Yamamah Palace
- Presiding officer: Abdullah ibn Muhammad Al ash-Sheikh, Chairman of the Consultative Assembly

Executive branch
- Head of state and government
- Title: King
- Currently: Salman
- Appointer: Allegiance Council
- Cabinet
- Name: Council of Ministers
- Current cabinet: Salman government
- Leader: Prime Minister (Note: Since the reign of King Faisal, the prime minister post has been held by the king.)
- Deputy leader: First Deputy Prime Minister
- Appointer: King
- Ministries: 23

Judicial branch
- Name: Judiciary of Saudi Arabia
- Specialized Criminal Court

Saudi Arabia is a unitary absolute monarchy, along traditional Islamist lines, where the King is both the head of state and government. Decisions are, to a large extent, made on the basis of consultation among the King, the Council of Ministers, Islamic scholars (until the mid-2010s), tribal leaders, and other traditional elites of the society. Saudi government is authoritarian, (Note: Sources: Schlager, Weisblatt, Neil, Jayne; A. Faksh, Hendrickson, Mahmud, Mary (2006). "Kingdom of Saudi Arabia". World Encyclopedia of Political Systems and Parties (4th ed.). 132 West 31st Street, New York NY 10001, USA: Facts on File. p. 1171. ISBN 0-8160-5953-5. "Saudi Arabia is not totalitarian. Travel outside the country is common, political crimes and violence are rare, people are not in constant fear of the police, and the state does not try to take over all existing organizations, such as philanthropic, religious, commercial, and industrial groups. Saudi rulers still see themselves in a parental role, much like a sheikh of a tribe who is in close touch with the concerns of his tribesmen and keeps those concerns in balance. For so long a time, a relatively benign monarchy has ruled over this populace that it has become used to being looked after in this manner. Therefore, until recently, calls for a more open, representative political system did not win wide support."; Oliver Collin, L. Martin, Richard, Pamela (2013). An Introduction to World Politics. United Kingdom: Rowman & Littlefield. p. 269. ISBN 978-1-4422-1803-1.; A. Dobratz, K. Waldner, Buzzel, Betty, Lisa, Timothy (2016). "2: Role of the state". Power, Politics, and Society: An Introduction to Political Sociology. NY 10017, New York, USA: Routledge. p. 50. ISBN 9780205486298.; Bernholz, Peter (2017). "1: Introduction". Totalitarianism, Terrorism and Supreme Values: History and Theory. Springer. p. 4. ISBN 978-3-319-56906-2. LCCN 2017937505.) although some analysts have characterized the government of Mohammed bin Salman as totalitarian. (Note: Sources: Bergen, Peter (10 October 2018). "The totalitarian prince: Trump's questionable friend in the Middle East". CNN. Archived from the original on 21 March 2022.; Bandow, Doug (19 May 2020). "Time to Cut Off Saudi Arabia". Cato Institute. Archived from the original on 29 March 2021.; Alkhaled, Sophia (27 January 2021). "Women's entrepreneurship in Saudi Arabia: Feminist solidarity and political activism in disguise?". Gender, Work & Organization. 28 (3): 950–972. doi:10.1111/gwao.12626.) The Crown Prince and Prime Minister of Saudi Arabia, Mohammed bin Salman, is the de facto ruler of Saudi Arabia. Under his rule, he has centralized policymaking, purged competing political elites, and dismantled pre-existing power-sharing dynamics.

The Basic Law of Saudi Arabia contains many characteristics of what might be called a constitution in other countries. The Qur'an and the Sunnah is declared as the official constitution of the country. The kingdom's governance is officially proclaimed to be conducted on the basis of Islamic law (Shari'a). The Allegiance Council is responsible to determine the new King and the new Crown Prince. All citizens of full age have a right to attend, meet, and petition the king directly through the traditional tribal meeting known as the majlis.

The government is dominated by the vast royal family, the Al Saud, which has often been divided by internal disputes and into factions. The members of the family are the principal political actors allowed by the government. Political participation outside the royal family is limited. Saudi Arabia is one of only four countries (the other being Vatican City, Brunei, and Afghanistan) that does not have a separate legislative body.

== Constitution ==
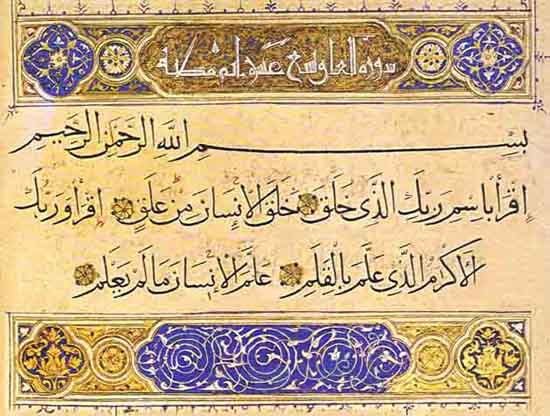
Verses from the Qur'an, the official constitution of the country

Saudi Arabia is an absolute monarchy. According to the Basic Law of Saudi Arabia, the country's de facto constitution adopted by royal decree in 1992, the king must comply with Sharia (that is, Islamic law) and the Qur'an. The Qur'an and the Sunnah are declared to be the de jure country's constitution. There is no legally binding written constitution and the Qur'an and the Sunna remain subject to interpretation. This is carried out by the Council of Senior Scholars, the Saudi religious establishment, although the power of the religious establishment has been significantly eroded in the 2010s.

The government of Saudi Arabia is led by King Salman, who acceded to the throne on 23 January 2015. No political parties or national elections are permitted, and according to The Economist's Democracy Index, the Saudi government was the eighteenth-most authoritarian regime among the 167 countries rated in 2022, being at it lowest score in 2012 and at its highest from 2020 to 2022. Government is dominated by the royal family.

== The King ==
The Basic Law specifies that the king must be chosen from among the sons of the first king, Abdulaziz Al Saud, and their male descendants subject to the subsequent approval of leaders (the ulama). In 2007, an "Allegiance Council" was created, consisting of King Abdulaziz's surviving sons plus a son of each of his deceased sons, to determine who will be the heir apparent (the Crown Prince) after the previous heir apparent dies or accedes to the throne. Prince Mohammad bin Salman is the current Crown Prince, and is widely regarded as the country's de facto ruler.

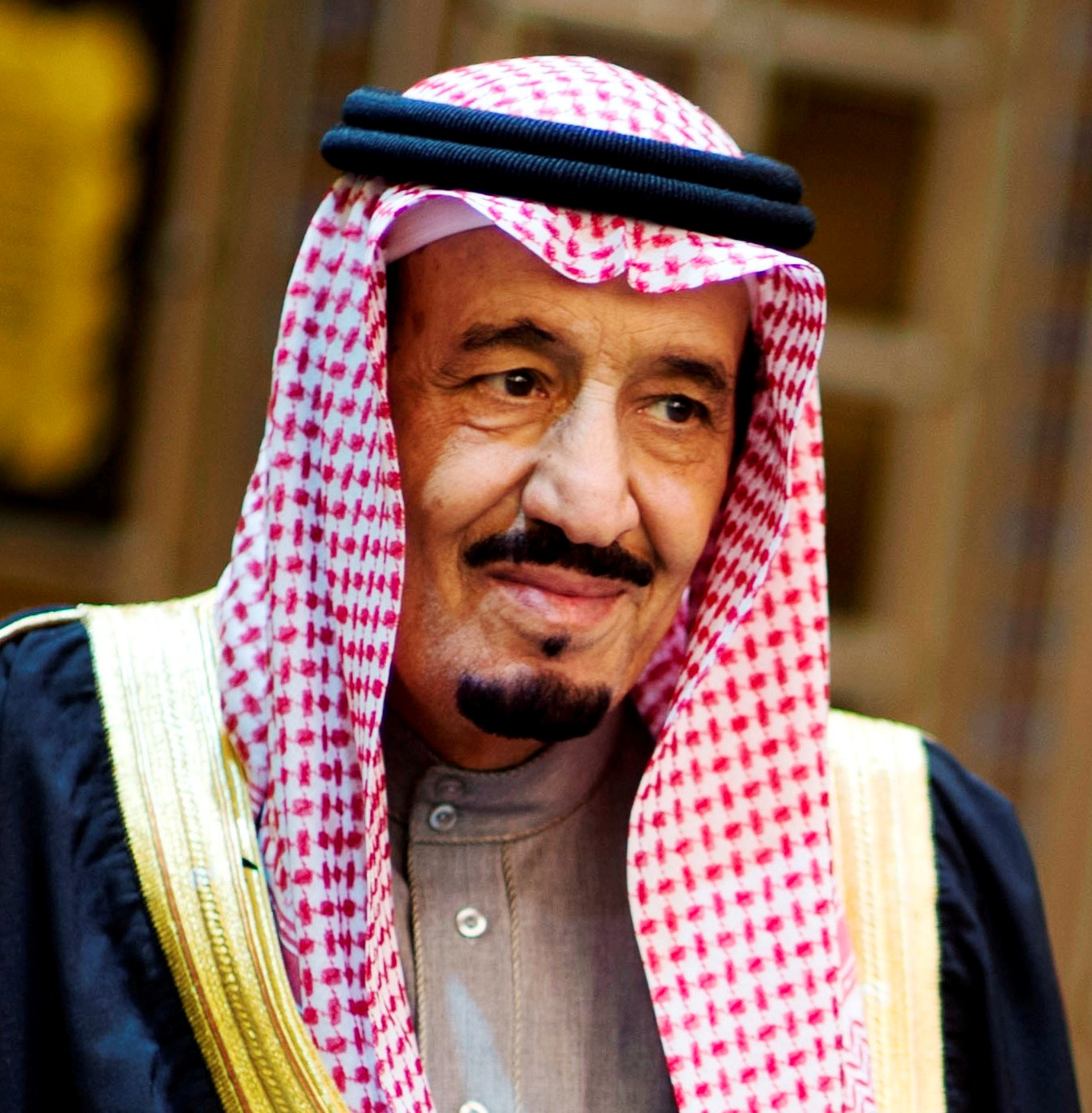
King Salman of Saudi Arabia (r. 2015–present)

The king combines legislative, executive, and judicial functions and royal decrees form the basis of the country's legislation. Until 27 September 2022, the King also served as Prime Minister. On that date, a royal decree appointed Crown Prince Mohammed bin Salman as Prime Minister, while King Salman retained his role as head of state and continues to chair cabinet meetings he attends. He presides over the Council of Ministers (Majlis al-Wuzarāʾ), which comprises the first and second deputy prime ministers (usually the first and second in line to the throne respectively), 23 ministers with portfolio, and five ministers of state. The king makes appointments to and dismissals from the council, which is responsible for such executive and administrative matters as foreign and domestic policy, defense, finance, health, and education, administered through numerous separate agencies. There is also a 150-member Consultative Assembly, appointed by the King, which can propose legislation to the King but has no legislative powers itself, including no role in budget formation. The government budget itself is not fully disclosed to the public. "Fully 40%" ... is labeled 'Other sectors' (including defense, security, intelligence, direct investment of the kingdom's revenues outside the country, and how much goes directly to the royal family).

Although in theory, the country is an absolute monarchy, in practice major policy decisions are made outside these formal governmental structures and not solely by the king. Decisions are made by establishing a consensus within the royal family (comprising the numerous descendants of the kingdom's founder, King Abdulaziz). Also, the views of important members of Saudi society, including the ulama (religious scholars), leading tribal sheiks, and heads of prominent commercial families are considered.

As an absolute monarchy, the personality and capabilities of the reigning monarch influence the politics and national policies of the country. King Saud (r. 1953–1964) was considered incompetent and extravagant and his reign led to an economic and political crisis that resulted in his forced abdication. King Faisal (r. 1964–1975) was a "modernist" who favored economic, technological and governmental progress but was also politically and religiously conservative. He directed the country's rapid economic and bureaucratic development of the early 1970s, but also made concessions to the religious establishment, and abandoned plans to broaden political participation. King Khalid (r. 1975–1982) left government largely to his Crown Prince, Fahd, who succeeded him as King (r. 1982–2005). Prince Fahd was a talented administrator who initiated significant industrial development in the Kingdom. He was regarded by many as the "father of the country's modernization". However, during the last 10 years of his reign, ill health prevented him from fully functioning. In the absence of a king who could provide strong central leadership, the state structure began to fragment and the country stagnated. King Abdullah (r. 2005–2015) was seen as a reformer and introduced economic reforms (limited deregulation, encouragement of foreign investment, and privatization) and made modernizing changes to the judiciary and government ministries.

=== Royal family ===
The royal family dominates the political system. The family's vast numbers allow it to hold most of the kingdom's important posts and to have an involvement and presence at all levels of government. The number of princes is estimated to be anything from 7,000 upwards, with the most power and influence being wielded by the 200 or so male descendants of King Abdulaziz. The key ministries have historically been reserved for the royal family, as are the thirteen regional governorships. With the large number of family members seeking well-paying jobs, critics complain that even "middle management" jobs in the Kingdom are out of reach for non-royal Saudis, limiting upward mobility and incentive for commoners to excel.

The one exception to this rule was Khaled al-Tuwaijri, Secretary-General of the Court and King Abdullah's éminence grise. He was a commoner and immensely powerful, which meant he was despised by most royals, especially the Sideris, who sacked him as soon as the old king died.

Long term political and government appointments result in the creation of "power fiefdoms" for senior princes. Examples include: King Abdullah, who was the Commander of the National Guard from 1963 until 2010, when he then appointed his son to replace him; Crown Prince Sultan was Minister of Defense and Aviation from 1962 to 2011; Crown Prince Nayef was the Minister of Interior from 1975 until his death in 2012; Prince Saud had been Minister of Foreign Affairs from 1975 to just before his death in 2015; and King Salman was the Governor of the Riyadh Region from 1962 to 2011.

In the absence of national elections and political parties, politics in Saudi Arabia takes place in two distinct arenas: within the royal family, the Al Saud, and between the royal family and the rest of Saudi society. The royal family is politically divided by factions based on clan loyalties, personal ambitions, and ideological differences. The most powerful clan faction is known as the 'Sudairi Seven', comprising the late King Fahd and his full brothers and their descendants. Ideological divisions include issues over the speed and direction of reform, and whether the role of the ulama should be increased or reduced. There were also divisions within the family over who should succeed Crown Prince Sultan.

Leading figures in the royal family with differing ideological orientations included Prince Nayef, the late Interior Minister, and Prince Saud Al-Faisal, the Foreign Minister. Prince Nayef was personally committed to maintaining Saudi Arabia's conservative Wahhabi values. Of the senior princes, he was probably the least comfortable with King Abdullah's desire for reform. Following the 11 September 2001 attacks in the United States, perpetrated mostly by Saudi nationals, Prince Nayef was strongly criticized by the U.S. for his reaction. It also took pressure from within the royal family for him to launch a hunt for Islamist militants who had attacked Western targets in Saudi Arabia. By contrast, Prince Saud Al Faisal is one of the strongest supporters of political and social reform. For example, he (as well as King Abdullah) has spoken in favor of women having the right to vote, to follow the career path they wish, and to be able to drive a car. Women would be able to vote in municipal elections beginning in 2012.

== Politics outside of the royal family ==
Politics in Saudi Arabia, outside the royal family, can be examined in three contexts: the extent to which the royal family allows political participation by the wider Saudi society, opposition to the regime, and Islamist terrorism. Main political issues included unemployment and jobs, inflation and taxes according to a 2026 Ipsos poll.

=== Political participation ===
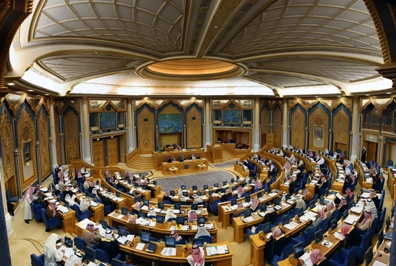
The Consultative Assembly at Al Yamamah Palace in Riyadh

Outside the House of Al Saud, participation in the political process is limited to a relatively small segment of the population and takes the form of the royal family consulting with the ulama, tribal sheiks, and members of important commercial families on major decisions. This process is not reported by the Saudi media. In theory, all males of the age of majority have a right to petition the king directly through the traditional tribal meeting known as the majlis. In many ways, the approach to government differs little from the traditional system of tribal rule. Tribal identity remains strong and, outside the royal family, political influence is frequently determined by tribal affiliation, with tribal sheiks maintaining a considerable degree of influence over local and national events. In recent years there have been limited steps to widen political participation, such as the establishment of the Consultative Council in the early 1990s and the National Dialogue Forum in 2003.

=== Opposition to the royal family ===
The rule of the Al Saud faces political opposition from four sources: Sunni Islamist activism, liberal critics, including an underground green party, the Shia minority – particularly in the Eastern Province; and long-standing tribal and regional particularistic opponents (for example in the Hejaz). Of these, the Islamic activists have been the most prominent threat to the regime and have in recent years perpetrated a number of violent or terrorist acts in the country. However, open protest against the government, even if peaceful, is not tolerated. On 29 January 2011, hundreds of protesters gathered in the city of Jeddah in a rare display of protest against the city's poor infrastructure after deadly floods swept through the city, killing eleven people. Police stopped the demonstration after about 15 minutes and arrested 30 to 50 people.

In March 2018, the crown prince Mohammed bin Salman faced severe criticism from British opposition figures during his visit to the United Kingdom. Salman was accused of funding extremism in the UK, committing human rights abuses domestically, and breaching international humanitarian law in Yemen with the on-going war, where millions are on the verge of famine. Later that year, he was criticized by many other countries after Saudi American journalist Jamal Khashoggi was murdered.

On 24 September 2020, a group of dissidents from Saudi Arabia announced the launch of a political party in opposition to King Salman's rule. The National Assembly Party members were exiled in the US, Britain, and elsewhere at the time of the party's launch from London. The opposition party aims to bring democracy as a form of government in the absolute monarchy and oust the de facto leader of Saudi Arabia, Mohammed bin Salman. The NAP is the first formalized political opposition in King Salman's rule. The country's Basic Law bans the formation of political parties and sanctions sedition and condemnation of the king with long jail terms. The founding members of the National Assembly Party are Activist Yahya Assiri, comedian Omar Abdulaziz, Professor Madawi al-Rasheed, and scholar Abdullah al-Aoudh.

== The influence of the ulama ==
The significance of the ulama (the body of Islamic religious leaders and jurists) is derived from the central role of religion in Saudi society. It has been said that Islam is more than a religion, it is a way of life in Saudi Arabia, and, as a result, the influence of the ulama is pervasive. Saudi Arabia is almost unique in giving the ulama a direct role in government, the only other example being Iran. Prior to 1971, a council of senior ulama advising the king was headed by the Grand Mufti and met informally. In that year, the council was formalized in a Council of Senior Scholars, appointed by the king and with salaries paid by the government.

Not only is royal succession subject to the approval of the ulama, so are all new laws (royal decrees). The ulama have also influenced major executive decisions, for example the imposition of the oil embargo in 1973 and the invitation of foreign troops to Saudi Arabia in 1990. It plays a major role in the judicial and education systems and has a monopoly of authority in the sphere of religious and social morals.

By the 1970s, as a result of oil wealth and the modernization of the country initiated by King Faisal, important changes to Saudi society were under way and the power of the ulama was in decline. However, this changed following the seizure of the Grand Mosque in Mecca in 1979 by Islamist radicals. The government's response to the crisis included strengthening the ulama's powers and increasing their financial support: in particular, they were given greater control over the education system and allowed to enforce stricter observance of Wahhabi rules of moral and social behaviour. Following his accession to the throne in 2005, King Abdullah took steps to rein back the powers of the ulama, for instance transferring their control over girls' education to the Ministry of Education.

The ulama have historically been led by the Al ash-Sheikh, the country's leading religious family. The Al ash-Sheikh are the descendants of Muhammad ibn Abd al-Wahhab, the 18th century founder of the Wahhabi form of Sunni Islam which is today dominant in Saudi Arabia. The family is second in prestige only to the Al Saud (the royal family) with whom they formed a "mutual support pact" and power-sharing arrangement nearly 300 years ago. The pact, which persists to this day, is based on the Al Saud maintaining the Al ash-Sheikh's authority in religious matters and upholding and propagating Wahhabi doctrine. In return, the Al ash-Sheikh support the Al Saud's political authority thereby using its religious-moral authority to legitimize the royal family's rule. Although the Al ash-Sheikh's domination of the ulama has diminished in recent decades, they still hold the most important religious posts and are closely linked to the Al Saud by a high degree of intermarriage.

=== Islamist terrorism ===
Osama bin Laden and 15 out of the 19 hijackers of 9/11 were Saudi nationals or were Saudi nationals formerly and former CIA director James Woolsey described Saudi Arabian Wahhabism as "the soil in which Al-Qaeda and its sister terrorist organizations are flourishing."

== Regional government ==
The kingdom is divided into 13 regions or provinces (manāṭiq), which in turn are divided into numerous districts. Regional governors are appointed, usually from the royal family, and preside over one or more municipal councils, half of whose members are appointed and half elected. The governors are responsible for such functions as finance, health, education, agriculture, and municipalities. The consultative principle operates at all levels of government, including the government of villages and tribes. The governors act as regional "mini-kings", sitting in majlises, hearing grievances, and settling disputes.

=== Municipal elections ===
In February 2005, the first elections in Saudi Arabian history were held. The elections for "virtually powerless" municipal councils were for half the seats (half of each council's seats were appointed). Women were not allowed to stand for office or to vote.

In Riyadh, the number of registered voters did not exceed 18% of those eligible to vote, representing only 2% of the city's population. There was evidence of much greater interest in the Shia community of the Eastern Province. Women will be allowed to vote beginning in 2012, as King Abdullah announced in the opening speech of the new term of the Shura Council.

In 2005, candidates tended to be local businessmen, activists, and professionals. Although political parties were not permitted, it was possible to identify candidates as having an Islamist orientation, a liberal agenda, or reliant on tribal status. The Islamist candidates tended to be backed by public figures and the religious establishment and won most of the seats in the Saudi cities such as Riyadh, Jeddah, Medina, Tabuk, and Taif. Candidates with "Western sympathies or any suspicion of secularism" lost out heavily to "hardline conservatives who were endorsed by the local religious establishment." This demonstrated to some that rather than being a conservative force holding back the country, the royal family was more progressive than the Saudi population as a whole.

In 2007, a Saudi commentator noted that the municipal councils were proving to be powerless. Nevertheless, the elections represented an important step in modernizing the regime.

Although male-only municipal elections were held again on 29 September 2011, Abdullah announced that women will be able to vote and be elected in the 2015 municipal elections.

== Corruption ==
Corruption is widespread in Saudi Arabia, most prevalent in the form of nepotism, the use of middlemen, 'wasta', to do business, as well as patronage systems. The Saudi government and the royal family have often, and over many years, been accused of corruption. In a country that is said to "belong" to the royal family and is named after it, the lines between state assets and the personal wealth of senior princes are blurred. The corruption has been described as systemic and endemic, and its existence was acknowledged and defended by Prince Bandar bin Sultan (a senior member of the royal family) in an interview in 2001.

Although corruption allegations have often been limited to broad undocumented accusations, specific allegations were made in 2007, when it was claimed that the British defence contractor BAE Systems had paid Prince Bandar US$2 billion in bribes relating to the Al-Yamamah arms deal. Prince Bandar denied the allegations. Investigations by both US and UK authorities resulted, in 2010, in plea bargain agreements with the company, by which it paid $447 million in fines but did not admit to bribery. Transparency International in its annual Corruption Perceptions Index for 2010 gave Saudi Arabia a score of 4.4 (on a scale from 0 to 10 where 0 is "highly corrupt" and 10 is "very clean").

During the 2017 Saudi Arabian anti-corruption arrests on 5 November, 11 princes and dozens of former ministers were detained in a new anti-corruption probe in Saudi Arabia. Among those detained include prominent billionaire investor Prince Al-Waleed bin Talal, National Guard Minister Miteb bin Abdullah and Economy and Planning Minister Adel Fakeih. The official line is that the purge was in response to corrupt practices by the accused and that the anti-corruption committee has the right to issue arrest warrants, impose travel restrictions, and freeze bank accounts. It is also empowered to investigate financials and freeze assets until cases are decided on. The Royal proclamation further said, "due to the propensity of some people for abuse, putting their interest above public interest, and stealing public funds."

In 2018, Saudi Arabian journalist Jamal Khashoggi was kidnapped and killed after he criticized the Saudi government.

On 6 March 2020, the Crown Prince of Saudi Arabia, Mohammed bin Salman detained three senior royal members, including King Salman's brother, Prince Ahmed bin Abdulaziz, the former crown prince, Muhammed bin Nayef, and his younger brother, to eliminate the risk of potential successors to the throne.

On 15 March 2020, Saudi Arabia conducted another mass-detention campaign and arrested 298 government employees out of the 674 people investigated on suspicion of corruption. The detainees included current and retired military officers, security officers under the Interior Ministry, health officials, and judges. The mass detention raised human rights concerns; Human Rights Watch called for the revelation of the legal and evidentiary basis for each person's detention.

On 6 August 2020, former top Saudi Intelligence official Saad AlJabri, who self-exiled in Canada, filed a lawsuit against Saudi Arabia's Crown Prince Mohammed bin Salman and other high-ranking officials. The lawsuit was filed at the Washington, D.C. court under the Torture Victim Protection Act, accusing the crown prince of sending a hit squad, dubbed Tiger Squad, in October 2018 for his extrajudicial killing.

In March 2021, more than 240 people were arrested in Saudi Arabia for corruption. Employees from the ministries of interior, health, municipal and rural affairs and housing, education, and human resources and social development, customs and the postal story were arrested.

== Political reform ==
In March 1992, King Fahd issued several decrees outlining the basic statutes of government and codifying royal succession for the first time. The King's political reform program also provided for the establishment of a national Consultative Council, with appointed members having advisory powers to review and give advice on issues of public interest. It also outlined a framework for councils at the provincial or emirate level.

In September 1993, King Fahd issued additional reform decrees, appointing the members of the National Consultative Council and spelling out procedures for the new council's operations. He announced reforms to the Council of Ministers, including term limitations of 4 years and regulations to prohibit conflict of interest for ministers and other high-level officials. The members of 13 provincial councils and the councils' operating regulations were also announced.

The membership of the Consultative Council was expanded from 60 to 90 members in July 1997, to 120 in May 2001, and to 150 members in 2005. Membership has changed significantly during each expansion of the council, as many members have not been reappointed. The role of the council is gradually expanding as it gains experience.

Since the 9/11 attacks in 2001, there has been mounting pressure to reform and modernize the royal family's rule, an agenda championed by King Abdullah both before and after his accession in 2005. The creation of the Consultative Council in the early 1990s did not satisfy demands for political participation, and, in 2003, an annual National Dialogue Forum was announced that would allow selected professionals and intellectuals to publicly debate current national issues, within certain prescribed parameters. In 2005, the first municipal elections were held. In 2007, the Allegiance Council was created to regulate the succession. In 2009, the king made significant personnel changes to the government by appointing reformers to key positions and the first woman to a ministerial post. However, the changes have been criticized as being too slow or merely cosmetic, and the royal family is reportedly divided on the speed and direction of reform.

Saudi municipal elections took place in 2005 and some journalists saw this as a first tentative step towards the introduction of democratic processes in the Kingdom, including the legalization of political parties. Other analysts of the Saudi political scene were more skeptical. Islamist candidates, often businessmen, did well, but in practice had little real power. In 2009, promised new elections and hopes for female suffrage in them were postponed for at least two years.

On 15 February 2009, in a reshuffle King Abdullah removed Sheikh Ibrahim Bin Abdullah Al-Ghaith from his position as President of the Commission for the Promotion of Virtue and the Prevention of Vice. He also removed Sheikh Saleh al-Luhaidan as head of the Supreme Judicial Council and appointed the first female minister.

In 2011, Abdullah announced that women will be able to be nominated to the Shura Council.

In his first act as King, Salman removed Khaled al-Tuwaijri, Abdullah's de facto Prime Minister and éminence grise, replacing him with Mohammed bin Nayef.

=== Arab Spring protests ===
Since 2011, Saudi Arabia has been affected by its own Arab Spring protests. In response, King Abdullah announced on 22 February 2011 a series of benefits for citizens amounting to $36 billion, of which $10.7 billion was earmarked for housing. No political reforms were announced as part of the package, though some prisoners indicted for financial crimes were pardoned. On 18 March the same year, King Abdullah announced a package of $93 billion, which included 500,000 new homes to a cost of $67 billion, in addition to creating 60,000 new security jobs.

The lack of critical thought in the education system has been cited by some as the reason why fewer protests occurred in the Kingdom.

Saudi Arabia and other GCC countries also sent some policemen to Bahrain to assist police clampdown on protesters within Bahrain.

== See also ==
- Censorship in Saudi Arabia
- Ministries of Saudi Arabia
- Committee for the Promotion of Virtue and the Prevention of Vice (Saudi Arabia)
- Human rights in Saudi Arabia
- The Bees Army
