= Royal State Palace, Jeddah =

Al-Salam Royal Palace
- قصر السلام الملكي
- Interactive map of the Al-Salam Royal Palace area

General information
- Status: Completed
- Type: Royal Palace / Government Building
- Architectural style: Modernist Architecture
- Location: Jeddah, Saudi Arabia
- Completed: 1982
- Client: King Fahd
- Owner: Government of Saudi Arabia

Technical details
- Size: 14,000 m^{2} (150,000 sq ft) (interior)
- Floor count: 2 storeys and a basement
- Grounds: 65,000 m^{2} (700,000 sq ft) (site)

Design and construction
- Architect: Kenzō Tange
- Architecture firm: Kenzo Tange & Urtec
- Main contractor: Saudi Oger

The Al-Salam Royal Palace (Arabic: قصر السلام الملكي) is an official royal residence and government building in the coastal city of Jeddah, Saudi Arabia. Commissioned during the reign of King Fahd, the modernist palace was designed by the Pritzker Prize-winning Japanese architect Kenzō Tange and completed in 1982.

The palace functions as a primary administrative hub for the Saudi Royal Court in the Western Region, frequently hosting meetings of the Council of Ministers and official state receptions for foreign heads of state.

== Design and specifications ==
The palace features a gross internal floor area of 14,000 m^{2} (150,000 sq ft) and sits on a heavily secured 65,000 m^{2} (700,000 sq ft) waterfront site along the Red Sea. Built over two storeys with an additional subterranean basement level, the layout is organized around a grand central axis, a characteristic feature of Tange's mid-to-late career projects. The design incorporates local environmental considerations, using thick granite facades and deep geometric recesses to mitigate the intense heat and glare of the coastal climate.

== Influence on subsequent works ==
The structural blueprint of the Al-Salam Royal Palace served as a direct template for Tange’s subsequent civic work in West Africa. In his monograph on Nigerian civic architecture, Nnamdi Elleh noted that Tange used the Al-Salam Royal Palace as the foundational inspiration for the Presidential Complex (Aso Rock Villa) in Abuja, Nigeria. The two complexes share a nearly identical composition, particularly visible in the treatment of the main facade, the entrance hallways, and the spatial progression of the official reception zones.
