= List of Saudi rulers =

This is a list of rulers of Saudi Arabia, a country in West Asia located on the Arabian Peninsula, along with its predecessor states, all ruled by the House of Saud.

For the First and Second Saudi states, the sovereign title was Imam (1727–1891). For the modern Kingdom of Saudi Arabia, the official title is King, who also officially holds the title of the Custodian of the Two Holy Mosques.

== List of rulers ==
List of Saudi rulers since 1727
| # | Ruler | Reign Start | Reign End | Reign Length |
|---|---|---|---|---|
First Saudi State (Emirate of Diriyah)
| 1 | Imam Muhammad bin Saud | 22 February 1727 | 20 August 1765 | 38 years |
| 2 | Imam Abdulaziz bin Muhammad | 1765 | 1803 | 38 years |
| 3 | Imam Saud bin Abdulaziz | 1803 | 1814 | 11 years |
| 4 | Imam Abdullah bin Saud | 1814 | 1818 | 4 years |
Second Saudi State (Emirate of Nejd)^{Note (Note: The Second Saudi State experienced frequent leadership transitions due to internal conflicts; however, the four designated Imams are recognized as the official, legitimate rulers according to Saudi government history accounts.)}
| 5 | Imam Turki bin Abdullah | 1824 | 1834 | 10 years |
| 6 | Imam Faisal bin Turki | 1834 | 1865 | 31 years |
| 7 | Imam Abdullah bin Faisal | 1865 | 1889 | 24 years |
| 8 | Imam Abdulrahman bin Faisal | 1889 | 1891 | 2 years |
Third Saudi State (Kingdom of Saudi Arabia)
| 9 | King Abdulaziz | 13 January 1902 | 9 November 1953 | 51 years |
| 10 | King Saud | 9 November 1953 | 2 November 1964 | 11 years |
| 11 | King Faisal | 2 November 1964 | 25 March 1975 | 10 years |
| 12 | King Khalid | 25 March 1975 | 13 June 1982 | 7 years |
| 13 | King Fahd | 13 June 1982 | 1 August 2005 | 23 years |
| 14 | King Abdullah | 1 August 2005 | 23 January 2015 | 9 years |
| 15 | King Salman | 23 January 2015 | Incumbent | 11 years |

== See also ==
- Saudi Royal Court
- King of Saudi Arabia
- History of Saudi Arabia
- Ministries of Saudi Arabia
- Formation of Saudi Arabia
- Government of Saudi Arabia
- Crown Prince of Saudi Arabia
- Prime Minister of Saudi Arabia
