= Franck Cédric =

Cameroonian footballer

Personal information
- Full name: Franck Cédric Njiki Tchoutou
- Date of birth: 15 May 1995 (age 31)
- Place of birth: Douala, Cameroon
- Height: 1.80 m (5 ft 11 in)
- Position: Winger

Youth career
- -2017: Roma

Senior career*
Years	Team	Apps	(Gls)
2014-2015	→ Nîmes (loan)	4	(0)
2015	→ Voluntari (loan)	4	(0)
2016	→ Siena (loan)	6	(1)
2016	→ Taranto (loan)	3	(0)
2017	→ Catanzaro (loan)	2	(0)
2018	Matera	3	(0)
- * Club domestic league appearances and goals

Franck Cédric Njiki Tchoutou (born 15 May 1995) is a Cameroonian former footballer who is last known to have played as a winger for Matera.

== Career ==
As a youth player, Cédric joined the youth academy of Italian Serie A side Roma after playing for Aspire Academy in Qatar.

In 2014, he was sent on loan to French second division club Nîmes.

In 2015, he was sent on loan to Voluntari in Romania.

Before the second half of 2016/17, Cédric was sent on loan to Italian third division team Catanzaro.
