= Saudi Arabian Boxing Federation =

- Sport: Boxing
- Abbreviation: SABF
- Founded: 1980; 46 years ago
- Headquarters: Riyadh
- President: Abdullah Ahmed Eid Al-Harbi

Official website
- www.sabf.sa
- (Saudi Arabia)

The Saudi Arabian Boxing Federation (SABF), also known as the Saudi Boxing Federation, is the governing body of amateur boxing in Saudi Arabia, established in 1980.

== History ==
In 1980, the Ministry of Sport of Saudi Arabia formed a national commission to monitor amateur boxing and regulate the sport in the Kingdom of Saudi Arabia. The federation oversees amateur boxing in both the men's and women's categories. Headquartered in Riyadh, it hosts amateur boxing matches, organizes training initiatives, and partners with international boxing bodies to enhance the sport's visibility in Saudi Arabia.

The national federation is a member of the International Boxing Association (IBA).

== Present-day ==
In April 2024, the Saudi Boxing Federation entered into a partnership with Ready to Fight, a pioneering boxing social platform co-founded by Oleksandr Usyk. The agreement is based on discovering new talent and involving leading boxing professionals in the Federation's initiatives.
