= Ministry of Sport (Saudi Arabia) =

Government ministry of Saudi Arabia

Ministry of Sport وزارة الرياضة

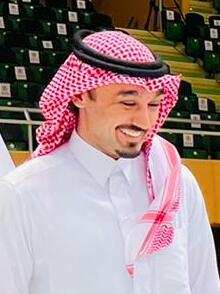
- Abdulaziz Al-Faisal, the current Minister of Sport since 25 February 2020

Agency overview
- Formed: 25 February 2020; 6 years ago
- Preceding agencies: General Presidency of Youth Welfare (1974–2016); General Sports Authority (2016–2020)
- Jurisdiction: Government of Saudi Arabia
- Headquarters: Riyadh
- Minister responsible: Abdulaziz Al-Faisal
- Child agencies: Saudi Arabian Football Federation; Saudi Arabian Basketball Federation; Saudi Arabian Handball Federation; Saudi Arabia Volleyball Association; Saudi Esports Federation; Saudi Olympic and Paralympic Committee
- Website: mos.gov.sa

The Ministry of Sport (Arabic: وزارة الرياضة) is a government ministry responsible for overseeing sport in Saudi Arabia.

== History ==
The General Presidency of Youth Welfare (GPYW) was established in 1974 by royal decree by the late King Faisal. In July 1987, the GPYW launched the Leadership Institute campus, the main Saudi entity accredited with training the youth to become expert trainers in sport.

The GPYW became known as the General Sports Authority in May 2016, following a royal decree restructuring the entity and placing Prince Abdullah bin Musaad Al Saud as its chairman.

Mohammed Al-Sheikh was appointed to the position of chairman of GSA in April 2017, replacing Prince Abdullah bin Musaad Al Saud. On September 6, Mohammed Al-Sheikh was replaced by Turki bin Abdel Muhsin Al-Asheikh at this position.

=== Community sports ===
The Ministry of Sport’ remit of improving and developing the sports environment in the Kingdom of Saudi Arabia includes a focus on encouraging sports and physical activity at the grassroots level. Towards that end, the Saudi Sports for All Federation (SFA) was created in 2018 as a dedicated body to drive community sports. In 2019, it was given the official mandate to lead community sports initiatives supporting the Saudi Vision 2030’s goals. The Quality of Life program calls for increasing the number of people undertaking regular physical activity in the Kingdom to 40% by 2030. Under the Ministry of Sport umbrella, the SFA is helping the Kingdom meet this target by creating sporting opportunities, encouraging lifestyle changes, and initiating campaigns and challenges encouraging physical activity. The SFA runs year-round initiatives, including community activities, sports challenges, virtual walking and running challenges, tournaments, and activations of public spaces to host sports-related activities.

The SFA App, launched in 2020 for iOS and Android devices, serves as the central hub for these initiatives. The App also hosts the SFA Rewards program, where users are incentivized to stay active by earning points that can be redeemed against gifts or charitable donations.

The SFA collaborates closely with public and private sector entities such as the Saudi Arabian Olympic Committee (SAOC), Ministry of Sport, Ministry of Municipal and Rural Affairs and the Saudi Data and AI Authority (SDAIA) to further its goal of a healthier, more active Saudi Arabia.

=== Football ===
In 2014, the Ministry of Sport unveiled a new stadium, King Abdullah Sports City Stadium, which hosted the final of the 2014 King's Cup. After the appointment of Turki Al-Asheikh as chairman in 2017, a committee was formed to find local talent in Saudi Arabian youth, and develop them into professional footballers. 70 young persons were admitted in the first edition of the program. Some tournaments and award systems were also restructured: The Crown Prince Cup was renamed the Super Cup, and the First Class Tournament became the Prince Faisal bin Fahd Tournament. The reward of the Custodian of the Two Holy Mosques Cup (King's Cup) was raised from SAR 5.5 million to SAR 10 million.

In July 2020, the ministry of sport launched Mahd Sports Academy, a sports academy that aims to scout, help, and train Saudi talent in various sports. The establishment of the academy is in line with Saudi Vision 2030 goals to develop the sports sector in Saudi Arabia.

=== Women in sports ===
On August 1, 2016, Princess Reema bint Bandar became the vice-president of Women’s Affairs at the Ministry of Sport.

In July 2017, the Saudi government announced physical education classes would be made available to girls in public state schools.

== Responsibilities ==
The Ministry of Sport in Saudi Arabia is responsible for the development and regulation of sports in the country. It oversees national sports federations, including the Saudi Arabian Football Federation, Saudi Arabian Basketball Federation, Saudi Arabian Handball Federation, Saudi Arabia Volleyball Association, Saudi Esports Federation, and the Saudi Olympic and Paralympic Committee.

The ministry owns and manages major sports venues, including King Fahd Sports City Stadium and King Abdullah Sports City Stadium. It also owns most professional football clubs and has plans to gradually transfer them to private owners; several clubs, including Al-Kholood, Al-Zulfi, and Al-Ansar, have already been sold to private owners.

The ministry organizes and supervises sporting events in the Kingdom and, in some cases, works with the General Entertainment Authority on major events.

== List of sports officials ==
No.	Portrait	Official	Took office	Left office	Years in office
Presidents of the General Presidency of Youth Welfare (1974–2016)
1		Faisal bin Fahd	1 July 1975	21 August 1999	24 years, 51 days
2		Sultan bin Fahd	1 September 1999	14 January 2011	11 years, 135 days
3		Nawaf bin Faisal	14 January 2011	26 June 2014	3 years, 163 days
4		Abdullah bin Musaed	26 June 2014	7 May 2016	1 year, 316 days
Presidents of the General Sports Authority (2016–2020)
1		Abdullah bin Musaed	7 May 2016	22 April 2017	350 days
2		Mohammad bin Abdulmalik	22 April 2017	6 September 2017	137 days
3		Turki Al-Sheikh	6 September 2017	27 December 2018	1 year, 112 days
4		Abdulaziz Al-Faisal	27 December 2018	25 February 2020	1 year, 60 days
Ministers of Sport (2020–present)
1		Abdulaziz Al-Faisal	25 February 2020	Incumbent	6 years, 240 days

== See also ==
- Ministries of Saudi Arabia
- Sport in Saudi Arabia
