= Saudi Human Resources Development Fund =

Saudi Arabia government agency

Human Resources Development Fund
- صندوق تنمية الموارد البشرية

Agency overview
- Formed: 31 July 2000; 24 years ago
- Headquarters: Riyadh, Saudi Arabia
- Agency executive: Ahmed Al-Rajhi, Chairman
- Website: www.hrdf.org.sa

The Human Resources Development Fund (HRDF) focuses efforts on raising the skills of national human resources, equipping them with knowledge, qualification, and adapting them to the needs of the labor market and jobs.

== History and Establishment ==
The Human Resources Development Fund (HRDF) was established by Council of Ministers Resolution No. (107), dated 29/04/1421 AH, with the goal of supporting the training and employment of the national workforce in the private sector.

HRDF is also linked to the National Development Fund (NDF), established by Royal Decree No. (A/13) on 13 Muharram 1439 AH (October 4, 2017). NDF is an independent entity, both financially and administratively, and reports to the Prime Minister. Meanwhile, the NDF aims to enhance the performance of the development funds and banks under its umbrella, ensuring they fulfill the objectives for which they were established. It seeks to align their efforts with national development priorities and economic needs, in line with the goals and pillars of Saudi Vision 2030.

== HRDF Vision ==
Building a sustainable national workforce in the Kingdom of Saudi Arabia.

== Mission ==
HRDF focuses efforts on raising the skills of national human resources, equipping them with knowledge, qualification, and adapting them to the needs of the labor market and jobs, while adopting an approach that puts the results achieved for the beneficiary as a focus in designing and providing work and services. It also seeks to improve the human resources system in KSA through the application of visions, drawing future directions for the labor market, and providing services to beneficiaries within a focused package of programs that takes into account the needs of the beneficiary and meets his requirements.

== HRDF Objectives ==
The Fund aims to support efforts to train and employ the national workforce in the private sector, and to achieve its objectives, it is authorized to undertake the following:

- Provide financial support for training, qualifying, and employing Saudi nationals in the private sector.
- Contribute to the costs of training the national workforce for private sector jobs. The HRDF Board determines the percentage it covers, while employers pay the remaining amount.
- Cover a portion of the salary for those hired in private sector companies after being trained or hired in coordination with HRDF. Employers cover the rest.This support is provided for up to two years, based on conditions set by the Board.
- Support field programs, projects, and studies aimed at increasing Saudi employment and replacing expat labor.
- Offer loans to training institutions established in the Kingdom or to existing companies looking to expand or modernize their operations.
- Conduct studies related to training, qualification, and employment, and provide technical and administrative consulting to relevant institutions.

== HRDF Programs ==
The programs have been redesigned to become (8) major programs with products designed to meet the needs of individual beneficiaries and enterprises, in order to achieve a comprehensive beneficial experience. The programs include:

Career Counseling and Guidance Program

Empowering all Saudis to make better educational and career choices by building an integrated system of career guidance services for students, teachers, job seekers, employers, and employees.

Products:

- Career Counseling and Guidance Platform (Subol): A dedicated platform designed to empower all Saudis to make informed educational and career decisions.
- Remote Career Counseling: Career counseling services delivered remotely by certified career advisors, aimed at supporting target groups—such as school and university students, job seekers, and employees—in their professional development.
- Career Counseling at Universities: A collaborative initiative with higher education institutions to promote the concept of career guidance by establishing career centers or offices within universities. This includes university and institute visits to activate career guidance programs and activities, helping students explore career skills and labor market trends to better align educational outcomes with labor market demands.
- Career Counseling at Schools: This initiative seeks to integrate and collaborate with the public and private education sectors to promote career awareness by activating career guidance programs in schools. Qualified career counselors work to align educational outputs with current and future labor market needs, enabling students to understand professional skills and requirements. The initiative also collaborates with educational authorities to deliver services that contribute to the academic and career development of students.

Training Support Program

It provides a set of enablers and support mechanisms for the training and employment of job seekers, in partnership with private sector establishments, non-profit organizations, and training providers. The goal is to enhance the skills of target groups, increase their employment opportunities in the private sector, develop their capabilities, and improve their job retention. Additionally, the initiative aims to prepare and develop future national leaders from among male and female employees in the private sector.

Products:

-Training Support for Job Seekers

-Training related to employment for job seekers.

-Training Support for Employees

-Training Support in Partnership with Employers

E-Training Program

It is one of the initiatives of the Human Resources Development Fund (HRDF), aimed at developing the capabilities and enhancing the skills of the national workforce—both male and female—by equipping them with the job-related competencies that support employment and job stability in line with the requirements of the Saudi labor market.

The e-Training Program (Doroob) offers a wide range of online training courses and learning tracks covering various topics that meet job market needs. These programs are accessible anytime, anywhere. Additionally, Doroob includes specialized training programs delivered in collaboration with HRDF’s partners to strengthen participants’ knowledge in specific fields and help them gain further experience and practical skills.

Products:

- General Training Content: Training Programs, Interactive Sessions, Learning Tracks

- Subsidized Training Content: Customized Training, Open Access

- Employee Training Support: in partnership with employers

On-The-Job-Training Program

A set of programs designed to train Saudi students in high school, diploma, and bachelor’s levels, as well as graduates of institutes and universities. These programs aim to raise career awareness and prepare them for the labor market by providing hands-on professional experience. The goal is to equip them with essential workplace skills, help them explore various fields and professions, and understand job roles within real work environments—ultimately reducing the duration of their job search period.

Products:

- Work Experience

- Cooperative Training

- Graduate Development (Tamheer)

Income Support Program

The program aims to provide financial support to private sector and non-profit organizations for employing male and female job seekers, with the Fund covering a percentage of the employee’s salary. It supports all full-time positions in the private sector, in addition to offering financial assistance for self-employment through freelance career pathways.

Products:

- Employment Support

- Freelance Products, which includes the following tracks:

- (Directed Transportation Support)

- Delivery Orders Support

Enablement Program

It offers a range of enablers and financial support for some of the most in-need cases. This includes covering part of the cost of childcare for working women, as well as covering part of the transportation costs for working women to and from the workplace. It also includes support for persons with disabilities (both males and females) working in the private and non-profit sectors, in order to empower their employment and enhance their stability in the labor market.

Products:

- Transport Support

- Childcare Support

- Dialysis Wage Support

Job Matching Program

Products:

Unified National Employment Platform – Jadarat

A national platform that facilitates the employment of promising talents by enabling access to all job opportunities in both the public and private sectors within the Saudi labor market.

The Platform was established by Royal Decree on 20/6/1442H, which mandated the consolidation of various employment platforms into a single, comprehensive platform. This unified system includes jobs in the civil service, semi-governmental entities, and the private sector.

Job Search Assistance Program

The program aims to support job seekers by providing a gradually decreasing financial allowance, starting at 2,000 SAR and continuing for a period of 15 months. The program also includes a range of training and employment services to help beneficiaries secure job opportunities.

It targets two main groups: individuals entering the labor market within two years of completing their education or training, and those who have been out of the labor market for more than two years.

Products:

A single program offering a decreasing financial allowance starting at 2,000 SAR for 15 months, integrated with the beneficiary’s journey through training and career guidance services provided by HRDF.

== See also ==
- Ministry of Labor and Social Development
- Saudization
