= Crown Prince of Saudi Arabia =

Heir to the Saudi throne

- ولي عهد المملكة العربية السعودية
- Standard of the Crown Prince

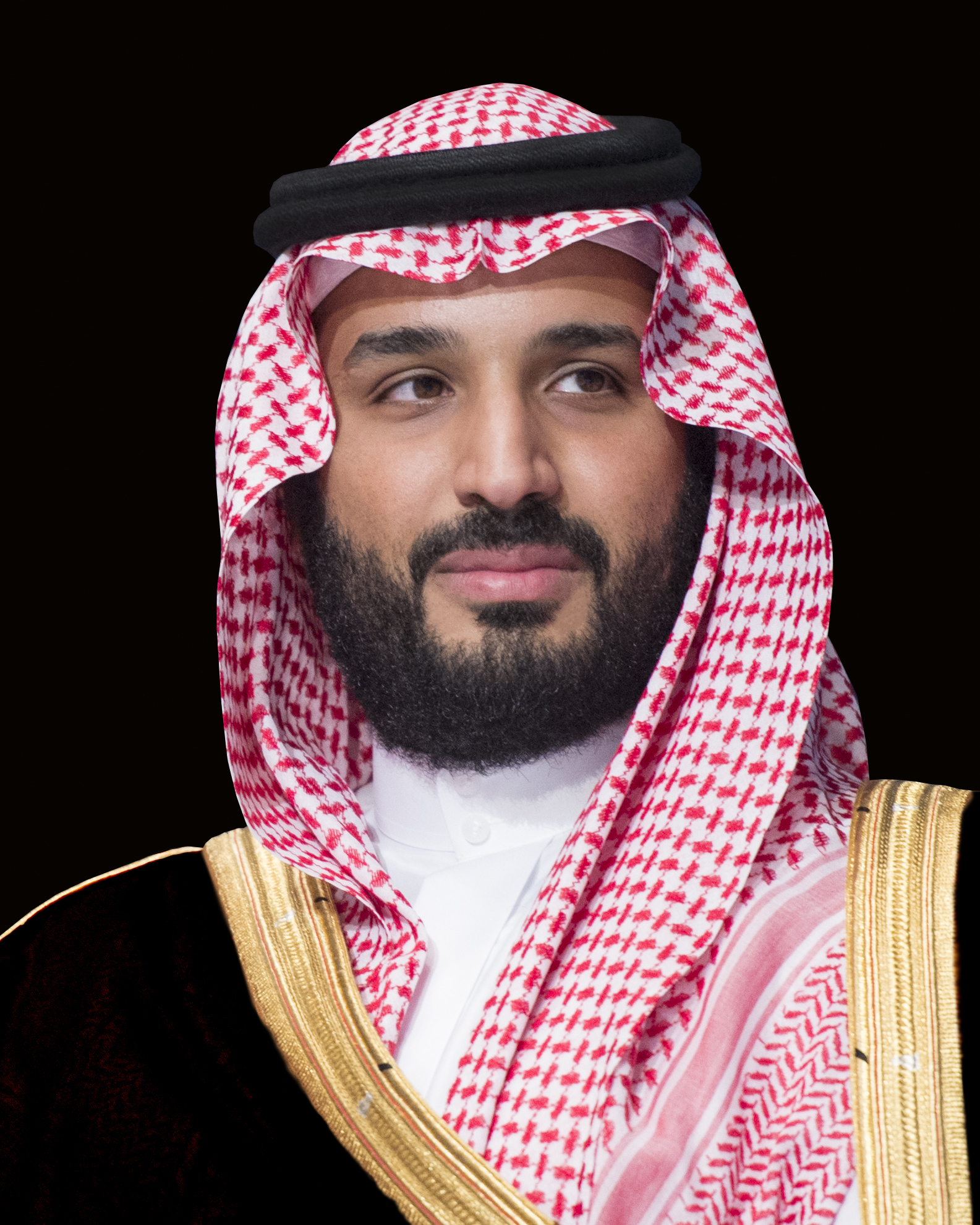
- Incumbent; Mohammed bin Salman since 21 June 2017
- Style: His Royal Highness
- Appointer: The King with approval of the Allegiance Council
- Term length: At the King's pleasure or until accession
- Inaugural holder: Saud bin Abdulaziz
- Formation: 11 May 1933; 93 years ago

The Crown Prince of the Kingdom of Saudi Arabia (Note: (Arabic: ولي عهد المملكة العربية السعودية, romanized: Waliyy ʿAhd al-Mamlakah al-ʿArabiyyah as-Suʿūdiyyah)) is the heir to the Saudi throne and the second-highest-ranking position in Saudi Arabia, after the King. The office of Prime Minister, which is the head of government, is traditionally held by either the King or the Crown Prince.

== History of the position ==
The last crown prince of the second Saudi State was Abdulaziz, who lost the title when Abdul Rahman bin Faisal, his father, lost his state after the Rashidis conquered Riyadh in 1890. The Al Sauds went into exile and took refuge in multiple Arab states of the Persian Gulf for nearly a decade. After the defeat at the battle of Sarif in 1900, Abdul Rahman bin Faisal gave up all ambitions to recover his patrimony. Despite this, Abdulaziz and his relatives remained determined to regain Nejd. Throughout the early 1900s, the Al Sauds went on multiple raiding expeditions and wars of conquest to attempt to regain Nejd from the Rashidis. Their efforts were highly successful, and as a result, they successfully formed the third Saudi state. When Abdulaziz had taken enough land to become recognized as an Emir, he designated his eldest son Turki as his heir. When Turki died during the flu pandemic of 1919, Abdulaziz designated his second son Saud to be heir and further succession would be brother to brother. The Al Sauds went on to expand their borders out of Nejd and established multiple iterations of the third Saudi state. In 1932, after Abdulaziz administered the Nejd and Hejaz as two separate states, he unified them and formed Saudi Arabia. Abdulaziz declared himself king, and designated Saud, one of his sons, as crown prince.

When King Abdulaziz discussed succession before his death, he was seen to favor Prince Faisal as a possible successor over crown prince Saud due to Faisal's extensive knowledge from years of experience. Many years before, King Abdulaziz recognized Faisal as the most brilliant of his sons and gave him multiple responsibilities in war and diplomacy. "I only wish I had three Faisals", King Abdulaziz once said when discussing who would succeed him. However, King Abdulaziz made the decision to keep Prince Saud as crown prince. His last words to his two sons, the future King Saud and the next in line Prince Faisal, who were already battling each other, were "You are brothers, unite!" Shortly before his death, King Abdulaziz stated, "Verily, my children and my possessions are my enemies."

A fierce power struggle between Abdulaziz's most senior sons, Saud and Faisal, erupted immediately after Abdulaziz's death. Faisal was declared the prime minister of Saudi Arabia in 1954, but had limited powers. Soon after, Saudi Arabia began having financial issues and debt as a result of Saud's disastrous policies. Saud was often associated among other things with the plundering of oil revenues, luxurious palaces, and conspiracy inside and outside of Saudi Arabia while Faisal was associated with sobriety, piety, puritanism, thriftiness, and modernization. As the issues in Saudi Arabia worsened, the House of Saud forced King Saud to delegate most of his executive powers to Faisal in 1958. However, Faisal was still unable to use his powers as Saud continued to block them, which prompted Faisal to resign in 1960, although he returned to the position in 1962. On 4 March 1964, Faisal and his brothers launched a bloodless coup d'état against Saud. Faisal was made regent, and Saud remained King as a purely ceremonial role. In November, the ulema, cabinet and senior members of the ruling family forced Saud to abdicate altogether, and Faisal became king in his own right. On 6 January 1965, Saud went to the palace with his uncle Abdullah bin Abdul Rahman to declare his allegiance to King Faisal.

The next in line, Prince Mohammed, was crown prince for a short time but disclaimed that title in favour of Prince Khalid in 1965.

Shortly after King Faisal was assassinated by his nephew, Khalid became the King of Saudi Arabia and Fahd became the crown prince. During Khalid and Fahd's reigns, both adopted conservative Islamic policies after the 1979 Grand Mosque seizure. When King Fahd had a stroke in 1995, crown prince Abdullah became the formal Regent for the remainder of Fahd's reign. When Abdullah became King, he began to modernize Saudi Arabia. He allowed women the right to vote and to work in government positions. Abdullah also created the Allegiance Council, a body that is composed of the sons and grandsons of Saudi Arabia's founder, King Abdulaziz, to vote by a secret ballot to choose future kings and crown princes.

As the nation became a gerontocracy in the 2000s and early 2010s, three crown princes died of old age in rapid succession. In the meantime, more and more princes were passed over. In January 2015, King Abdulaziz's last son, Muqrin, became crown prince, only to be ousted three months later in favour of his nephew, Muhammad bin Nayef. Mohammed bin Nayef, the first grandson of King Abdulaziz to hold the title, was himself removed in June 2017 by Mohammed bin Salman, another grandson of King Abdulaziz.

=== History of the second deputy prime minister position ===
The honorific title of "Second Deputy Prime Minister" goes back to 1967, in order to designate who was the senior prince not excluded from the throne. The position was created by King Faisal.

In March 1965, under pressure from King Faisal and the House of Saud, crown prince Mohammed stepped down as heir apparent to the Saudi throne. Mohammed was known to have temper issues and drinking problems. As a result, King Faisal installed Prince Khalid as crown prince. However, he was reluctant to accept the offer of King Faisal to be named crown prince several times until March 1965. In addition, Khalid asked King Faisal to remove him from the position various times. One of the speculations about Prince Khalid's selection as heir designate was his lack of predilection for politics. In short, by selecting him as heir designate the royal family could create an intra-familial consensus. In 1967, crown prince Khalid expressed his desire not to preside over the Council of Ministers against King Faisal's request which led to the appointment of Prince Fahd as second deputy prime minister with the task of leading the Council meetings. Prince Saad and Prince Nasir, who were older than Fahd, were set aside from the throne due to being less experienced.

When King Faisal was assassinated in 1975, King Khalid designated Prince Fahd as crown prince and Prince Abdullah as second deputy prime minister.

As King Khalid became ill with old age, the question of who would succeed Abdullah as the second deputy prime minister became more pressing. Prince Abdullah was succeeded by Prince Sultan as de facto Deputy Prime Minister of The Kingdom.

Name	Lifespan	Reign start	Reign end	Notes	Family	Image
Fahd bin Abdulaziz: فهد	16 March 1921 – 1 August 2005 (aged 84)	1967	25 March 1975 (became crown prince)	Son of King Abdulaziz and Hussa bint Ahmed Al Sudairi	Saud	Fahd of Saudi Arabia
Abdullah bin Abdulaziz: عبد الله	1 August 1924 – 22 January 2015 (aged 90)	25 March 1975	13 June 1982 (became crown prince)	Son of King Abdulaziz and Fahda bint Asi Al Shammari	Saud	Abdullah of Saudi Arabia
Sultan bin Abdulaziz: سلطان	1 August 1931 – 22 October 2011 (aged 80)	13 June 1982	1 August 2005 (became crown prince)	Son of King Abdulaziz and Hussa bint Ahmed Al Sudairi	Saud	Sultan bin Abdulaziz
Nayef bin Abdulaziz: نايف	23 August 1934 – 16 June 2012 (aged 77)	1 August 2005	22 October 2011 (became crown prince)	Son of King Abdulaziz and Hussa bint Ahmed Al Sudairi	Saud	Nayef bin Abdulaziz

=== History of the deputy crown prince position ===
The honorific title of "Deputy Crown Prince" dates back to 2014. The position was created by King Abdullah. Muqrin bin Abdul'aziz Al Saud was the first prince to hold the deputy crown prince position. Since 21 June 2017, the post of deputy crown prince has been vacant. So far, no man who has served as Deputy Crown Prince has ever become King.

Name	Lifespan	Reign start	Reign end	Notes	Family	Image
Muqrin bin Abdulaziz: مقرن	15 September 1945 (age 81)	27 March 2014	23 January 2015 (became crown prince)	Son of Ibn Saud and Baraka Al Yamaniyah	Saud	Muqrin bin Abdulaziz
Muhammad bin Nayef: محمد بن نايف	30 August 1959 (age 67)	23 January 2015	29 April 2015 (became crown prince)	Son of Prince Nayef bin Abdulaziz and Al Jawhara bint Abdulaziz Al Jiluwi	Saud	Mohammed bin Salman
Mohammed bin Salman: محمد بن سلمان	31 August 1985 (age 41)	29 April 2015	21 June 2017 (became crown prince)	Son of King Salman and Fahda bint Falah Al Hithlain	Saud	Mohammed bin Salman

== Crown Princes of Saudi Arabia (1933–present) ==
Name	Lifespan	Reign start	Reign end	Notes	Family	Image
Saud bin Abdulaziz: سعود	15 January 1902 – 23 February 1969 (aged 67)	11 May 1933	9 November 1953 (became king)	Son of King Abdulaziz and Wadha bint Muhammad Al Orair	Saud	Saud of Saudi Arabia
Faisal bin Abdulaziz: فيصل	14 April 1906 – 25 March 1975 (aged 68)	9 November 1953	2 November 1964 (became king)	Son of King Abdulaziz and Tarfa bint Abdullah Al Sheikh	Saud	Faisal of Saudi Arabia
Muhammad bin Abdulaziz: محمد	4 March 1910 – 25 November 1988 (aged 78)	2 November 1964	29 March 1965 (abdicated)	Son of King Abdulaziz and Al Jawhara bint Musaed Al Saud	Saud	Muhammad bin Abdulaziz Al Saud
Khalid bin Abdulaziz: خالد	13 February 1913 – 13 June 1982 (aged 69)	29 March 1965	25 March 1975 (became king)	Son of King Abdulaziz and Al Jawhara bint Musaed Al Saud	Saud	Khalid of Saudi Arabia
Fahd bin Abdulaziz: فهد	16 March 1921 – 1 August 2005 (aged 84)	25 March 1975	13 June 1982 (became king)	Son of King Abdulaziz and Hussa bint Ahmed Al Sudairi	Saud	Fahd of Saudi Arabia
Abdullah bin Abdulaziz: عبد الله	1 August 1924 – 22 January 2015 (aged 90)	13 June 1982	1 August 2005 (became king)	Son of King Abdulaziz and Fahda bint Asi Al Shammari	Saud	Abdullah of Saudi Arabia
Sultan bin Abdulaziz: سلطان	1 August 1931 – 22 October 2011 (aged 80)	1 August 2005	22 October 2011 (died in office)	Son of King Abdulaziz and Hussa bint Ahmed Al Sudairi	Saud	Sultan bin Abdulaziz
Nayef bin Abdulaziz: نايف	23 August 1934 – 16 June 2012 (aged 77)	22 October 2011	16 June 2012 (died in office)	Son of King Abdulaziz and Hussa bint Ahmed Al Sudairi	Saud	Nayef bin Abdulaziz
Salman bin Abdulaziz: سلمان	31 December 1935 (age 90)	16 June 2012	23 January 2015 (became king)	Son of King Abdulaziz and Hussa bint Ahmed Al Sudairi	Saud	Salman bin Abdulaziz
Muqrin bin Abdulaziz: مقرن	15 September 1945 (age 81)	23 January 2015	29 April 2015 (abdicated)	Son of King Abdulaziz and Baraka Al Yamaniyah	Saud	Muqrin bin Abdulaziz
Muhammad bin Nayef: محمد بن نايف	30 August 1959 (age 67)	29 April 2015	21 June 2017 (deposed)	Son of Prince Nayef bin Abdulaziz and Al Jawhara bint Abdulaziz Al Jiluwi	Saud	Muhammad bin Naif
Mohammed bin Salman: محمد بن سلمان	31 August 1985 (age 41)	21 June 2017	Incumbent	Son of King Salman and Fahda bint Falah Al Hithlain	Saud	Mohammed bin Salman

== Royal symbols and styles ==
Styles of The Crown Prince of Saudi Arabia
- Reference style: His Royal Highness
- Spoken style: Sir

The Crown Prince is styled as His Royal Highness and is addressed as "Your Royal Highness" in formal contexts and as "Sir" in direct address.

=== Royal Standard ===
The Royal Standard of the Crown Prince is based on the Flag of Saudi Arabia, consisting of a green field bearing the Islamic declaration of faith and a sword, both rendered in white. The national emblem of Saudi Arabia is embroidered in silver in the lower-right canton.

Royal Standard of the Crown Prince

== See also ==
- Saudi Royal Court
- List of Saudi rulers
- King of Saudi Arabia
- Government of Saudi Arabia
- Prime Minister of Saudi Arabia
- Council of Ministers of Saudi Arabia
- Succession to the Saudi Arabian throne
