= Prime Minister of Saudi Arabia =

Head of government

Prime Minister of the Kingdom of Saudi Arabia
- رئيس وزراء المملكة العربية السعودية
- Royal Standard of the Crown Prince

- Flag of Saudi Arabia

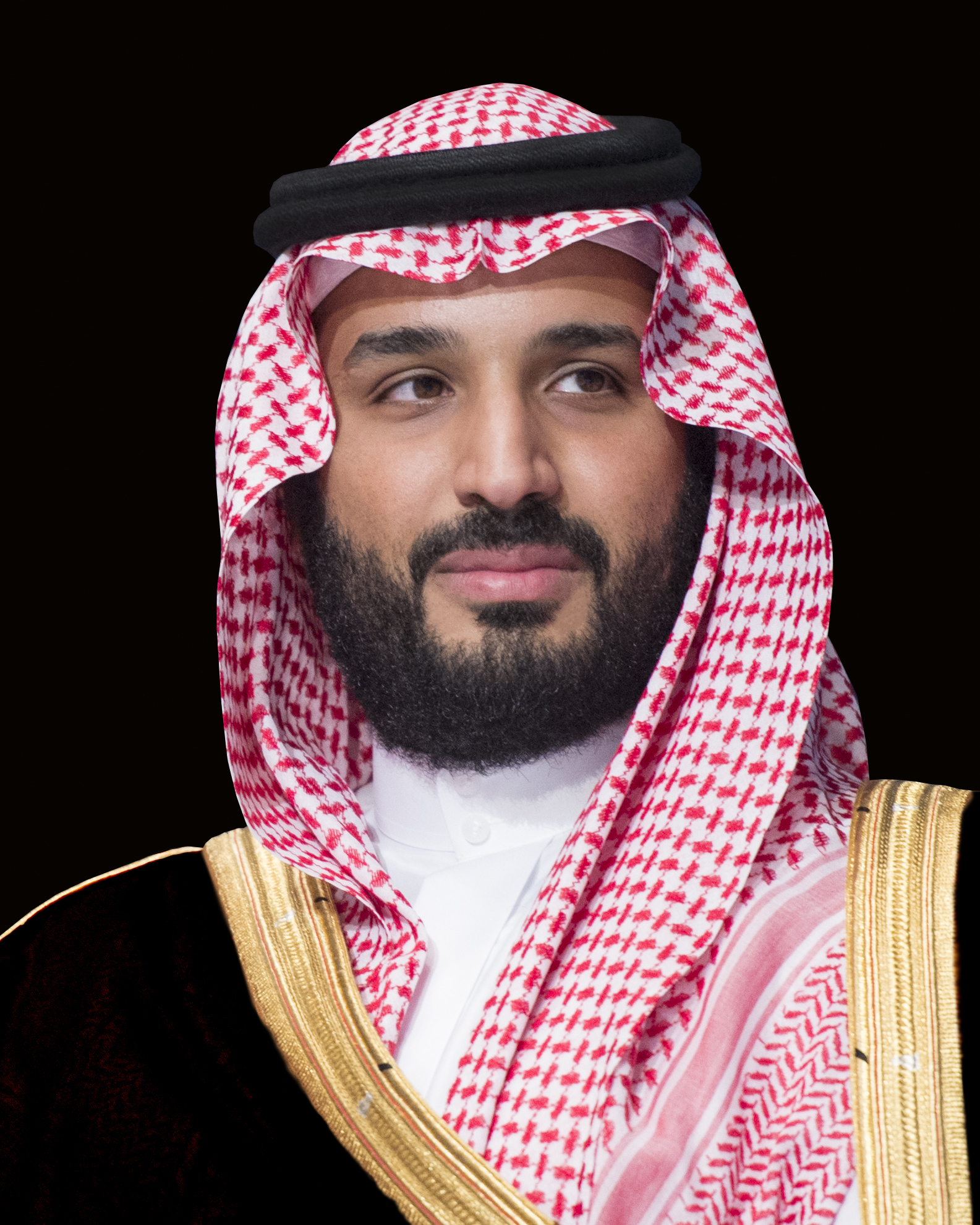
- Incumbent; Mohammed bin Salman since 27 September 2022
- Council of Ministers of Saudi Arabia
- Style: His Royal Highness (formal); Mr. Prime Minister (informal)
- Type: Head of government
- Abbreviation: PM
- Member of: Council of Ministers; Riyadh City Royal Commission; Mecca City and Holy Sites Royal Commission
- Reports to: King of Saudi Arabia
- Residence: Various
- Seat: Riyadh
- Appointer: Royal order
- Term length: No fixed term
- Constituting instrument: Basic Law of Saudi Arabia
- Formation: 9 October 1953; 73 years ago
- First holder: Saud bin Abdulaziz
- Deputy: Vacant
- Website: www.my.gov.sa

The prime minister of Saudi Arabia (Note: The office is called رئيس مجلس الوزراء in Arabic, romanized as raʾīs majlis al-wuzrāʾ, which literally means "Chairman of the Council of Ministers.") is the chairman of the Council of Ministers and the head of government of the Kingdom. The office is traditionally held by either the king or the crown prince. Since 27 September 2022, the position has been held by Crown Prince Mohammed bin Salman.

== History ==
The office of prime minister was established on 9 October 1953, by decree of King Saud. Internal royal family dissatisfaction with Saud's rule led to the appointment of his half-brother, Crown Prince Faisal, as prime minister. A power struggle between the two led to Faisal's resignation in 1960, allowing Saud to regain control. Continued instability, however, resulted in Faisal's reappointment in 1962.

After Saud was deposed in 1964, Faisal succeeded him as King while remaining Prime Minister. Following Faisal’s death, his successors maintained the merger of the two offices until 2022. Since the reign of King Khalid, administrative duties were often delegated, and during the kingdom's gerontocracy in the 1990s and 2000s, royal favorites occasionally carried out the duties of the prime minister in practice.

The merger of the offices ended on 27 September 2022, when King Salman issued a royal decree appointing his son and top aide, Mohammed bin Salman, as Prime Minister. At 37 years old, Mohammed bin Salman became the youngest person to hold the office and the first prime minister from the generation of the grandsons of King Abdulaziz. Under this arrangement, Mohammed bin Salman became the head of government, while King Salman remains the head of state.

== List of prime ministers ==
No.	Portrait	Name (Birth–Death)	Took office	Left office	Time in office	Monarch
1		Saud bin Abdulaziz (1902–1969)	9 October 1953	16 August 1954	311 days	Himself
2		Faisal bin Abdulaziz (1906–1975)	16 August 1954	21 December 1960	6 years, 127 days	Saud
3		Saud bin Abdulaziz (1902–1969)	21 December 1960	31 October 1962	1 year, 314 days	Himself
4		Faisal bin Abdulaziz (1906–1975)	31 October 1962	25 March 1975	12 years, 145 days	Saud (1962–64) Himself (1964–75)
5		Khalid bin Abdulaziz (1913–1982)	25 March 1975	13 June 1982	7 years, 80 days	Himself
6		Fahd bin Abdulaziz (1921–2005)	13 June 1982	1 August 2005	23 years, 49 days	Himself
7		Abdullah bin Abdulaziz (1924–2015)	1 August 2005	23 January 2015	9 years, 175 days	Himself
8		Salman bin Abdulaziz (born 1935)	23 January 2015	27 September 2022	7 years, 247 days	Himself
9		Mohammed bin Salman (born 1985)	27 September 2022	Incumbent	4 years, 37 days	Salman

== List of first and second deputy prime ministers ==
=== First Deputy Prime Minister ===
No.	Portrait	Name (Birth–Death)	Time in office		
No.	Portrait	Name (Birth–Death)	Took office	Left office	Time in office
1		Faisal bin Abdulaziz (1906–1975)	9 October 1953	16 August 1954	311 days
2		Faisal bin Abdulaziz (1906–1975)	21 December 1960	31 October 1962	1 year, 314 days
3		Khalid bin Abdulaziz (1913–1982)	31 October 1962	25 March 1975	12 years, 145 days
4		Fahd bin Abdulaziz (1921–2005)	25 March 1975	13 June 1982	7 years, 80 days
5		Abdullah bin Abdulaziz (1924–2015)	13 June 1982	1 August 2005	23 years, 49 days
6		Sultan bin Abdulaziz (1928–2011)	1 August 2005	22 October 2011	6 years, 82 days
7		Nayef bin Abdulaziz (1934–2012)	28 October 2011	16 June 2012	232 days
8		Salman bin Abdulaziz (born 1935)	18 June 2012	23 January 2015	2 years, 219 days
9		Muqrin bin Abdulaziz (born 1945)	23 January 2015	29 April 2015	96 days
10		Muhammad bin Nayef (born 1959)	29 April 2015	21 June 2017	2 years, 53 days
11		Mohammed bin Salman (born 1985)	21 June 2017	27 September 2022	5 years, 98 days
–	–	Vacant	27 September 2022	Incumbent	4 years, 37 days

=== Second Deputy Prime Minister ===
No.	Portrait	Name (Birth–Death)	Took office	Left office	Time in office
1		Fahd bin Abdulaziz (1921–2005)	1967 (Note: The exact date in 1967 is unknown.)	25 March 1975	8 years, 83 days
2		Abdullah bin Abdulaziz (1924–2015)	25 March 1975	13 June 1982	7 years, 80 days
3		Sultan bin Abdulaziz (1928–2011)	13 June 1982	1 August 2005	23 years, 49 days
4		Nayef bin Abdulaziz (1934–2012)	27 March 2009	28 October 2011	2 years, 215 days
5		Muqrin bin Abdulaziz (born 1945)	1 February 2013	23 January 2015	1 year, 356 days
6		Muhammad bin Nayef (born 1959)	23 January 2015	29 April 2015	96 days
7		Mohammed bin Salman (born 1985)	29 April 2015	21 June 2017	2 years, 53 days
–	–	Vacant	21 June 2017	Incumbent	9 years, 135 days

== See also ==
- Saudi Royal Court
- List of Saudi rulers
- King of Saudi Arabia
- Government of Saudi Arabia
- Crown Prince of Saudi Arabia
- Council of Ministers of Saudi Arabia
