= Walid al-Samaani =

Saudi Minister of Justice (born 1977)

- وليد الصمعاني
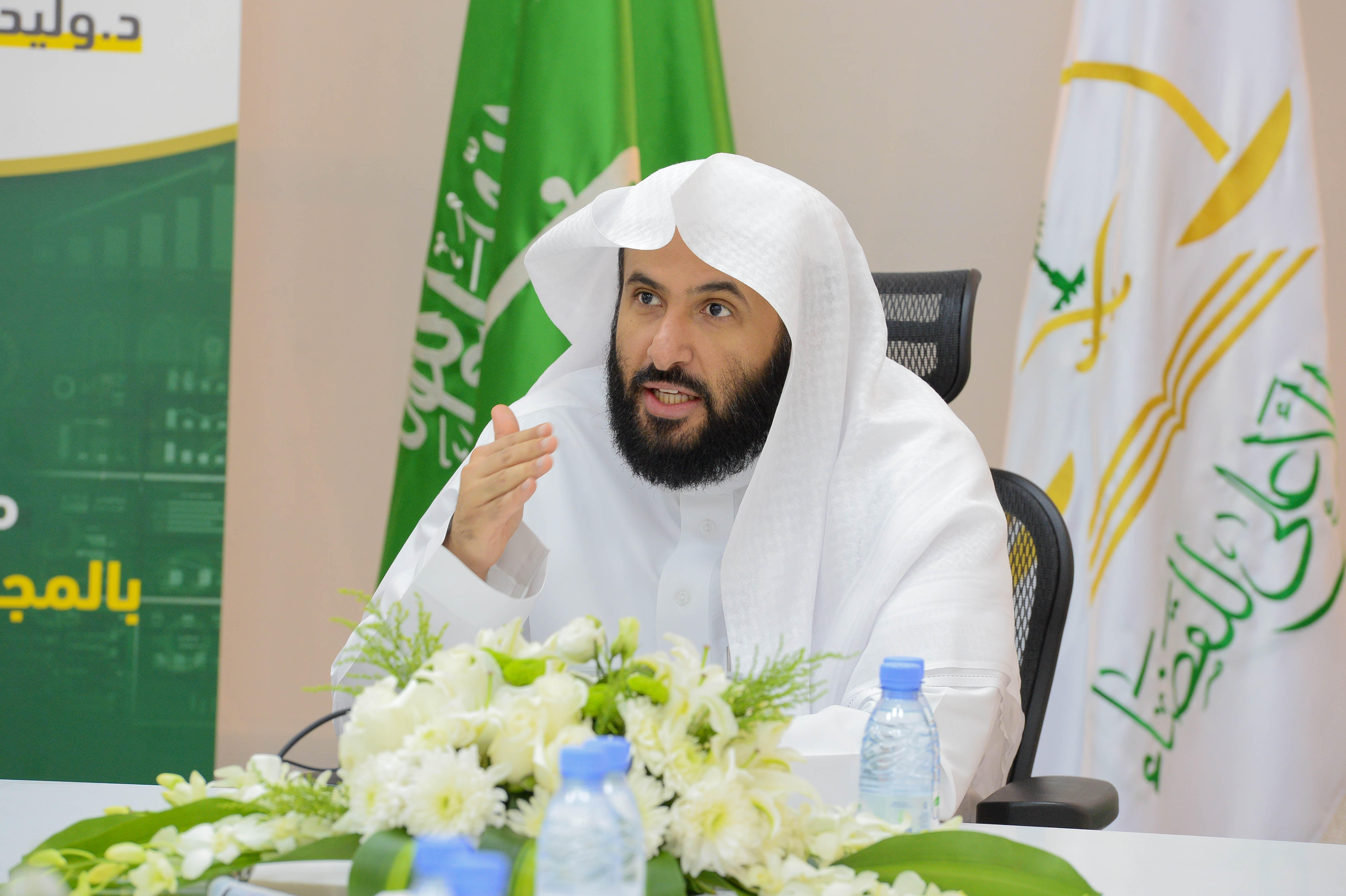
- Al-Samaani in 2019

Minister of Justice President of the Supreme Judicial Council
- Incumbent
- Assumed office 23 January 2015
- Monarch: Salman
- Prime Minister: Salman (2015–2022); Mohammad bin Salman (2022–present)
- Preceded by: Mohammad bin Abdulkarim Al-Issa

Personal details
- Born: 1977 (age 48–49)
- Education: Imam Mohammad Ibn Saud Islamic University (BA, PhD)

Dr. Walid bin Mohammed al-Samaani (born 1977) is a jurist and administrator who has serves as the Justice Minister in the Government of Saudi Arabia. He was appointed in the first cabinet formed by King Salman bin Abdulaziz Al Saud after he assumed the throne on January 23, 2015.

Previously, al-Samaani was an advisor at King Salman's office while he was crown prince in July 2013. Al-Samaani also served as a judge at the Saudi Board of Grievances (administrative judiciary).

== Early life ==
Al-Samaani grew up in Riyadh, with his parents and brothers, where he completed his public education.

== Education ==
In his youth, al-Samaani was an avid reader, especially literature, jurisprudence, history and intellectual books. He also participated in cultural events and scholarly contests.

He earned a B.A. in Islamic Law from Riyadh College of Islamic Sharia, Imam Muhammad bin Saud Islamic University, in 1999–2000. He was then nominated as a lecturer at the Department of Jurisprudence at the same college and concluded his first master's degree. Al-Samaani earned his second master's degree with honors from the Department of Sharia at the High Judicial Institute, part of Imam university. Al-Samaani earned his PhD in comparative law with first class honors from the same institute. His Dissertation was on “the Discretionary jurisdiction of administrative judges - a comparative applied study.” Which received admiration of the panel and recommended for scholarly publishing and circulation.

== Career ==
On May 21, 2001, al-Samaani joined the Board of Grievances and served as a judge in the administrative, disciplinary, criminal and commercial judiciary. He headed a number of panels; and served as a member of the Technical Affairs Office, specialized in review, research, and classification of rulings and judicial principles. He was appointed as a member of the Training and Development Committee, and a member of the team supervising electronic documentation of rulings. He also served as secretary of the review body establishing judicial principles.

He represented the Board of Grievances in many committees formed at the Cabinet's Bureau of Experts for studying and amending draft laws and regulations, such as the committee formed for reviewing laws from 2007 to 2013.

As of July 9, 2013, al-Samaani was appointed as a legal advisor at King Salman's office when he was crown prince, and participated in many judicial seminars.

On January 29, 2015, a royal decree appointed al-Samaani as Minister of Justice in the first cabinet formed by King Salman after he succeeded late King Abdullah.

=== Other positions Ministry of Justice ===
- President of the Supreme Judicial Council
- Member of the Council of Economic and Development Affairs
- Chairman of Alimony Fund
- Chairman of the Support and Liquidation Center
- Chairman of the Saudi Bar Association

=== Al-Samaani’s work at the Saudi ministry of Justice ===
- Judicial specialization through the introduction of number of specialized courts
- Implementing pleadings before the Appellate Court
- Implementing appeals before the Supreme Court
- Preparing for the bankruptcy judiciary
- Launching initiative for audio-visual recording of hearings
- Adopting Model Court initiative for developing judicial work
- Launching commercial courts on October 16, 2017
- Launching labor courts on November 25, 2018
- Launching Paperless Court project
- Launching electronic minutes and judgments
- Issuing a circular prohibiting penalty based on suspicion (“either conviction or acquittal”)
- Launching electronic notices
- Launching the digital transformation of enforcement judiciary
- Launching e-payment service for enforcement of rulings
- Engaging the private sector in enforcement services
- Recognizing new types of enforcement instruments, such as electronic leases and mediation records
- Setting up special centers for implementing child custody and visitation rulings
- Initiating the digital transformation of notarial procedures
- Launching the Property Title Digitization Initiative
- Engaging the private sector in notarial services
- Revoking territorial jurisdiction of notarial offices
- Granting notarization licenses to women for the first time
- Launching Najiz portal for effective and unified communication
- Launching Najiz Center for Judicial Services
- Launching Qayyim initiative for enhancing client satisfaction
- Launching electronic certification of marriage contracts
- Establishing the Alimony Fund
- Empowering women in new roles at the Ministry of Justice
- Contributing to improving Saudi Arabia's rankings in global indicators such as the World Bank indicators and Global Competitiveness Report
- Establishing the Judicial Command Center to enhance performance and quality
- Launching Law Practice Diploma and granting licenses to successful trainees
- Launching English publication initiative and opening communication channels with the public
- Approving new work rules for mediation offices
- Introducing awards for judges to encourage innovation and enrichment of knowledge

== Research ==
- The Discretionary Jurisdiction of Administrative Judges - a Comparative Applied Study. (Two volumes.) Dar Al-Maiman for Publishing and Distribution, 2015.
- Participating in the joint development agreement, signed between the Board of Grievances and the Imam Muhammad bin Saud Islamic University.
- Participating in the preparation of the draft regulations for judiciary affairs at the Board of Grievances and the Supreme Judicial Council.
- Presenting a vision for the academic curriculum of the High Judicial Institute of Imam Muhammad bin Saud Islamic University.
- Participating in studying academic standards for Islamic Law programs at Saudi universities.
- Preparing scholarly themes for several courses and seminars, including: The program for drafting rulings; the program for training judge assistants; and the preparatory diploma for the judges of the Board of Grievances.
- Studying the feasibility of establishing a commission for state cases.
- Studying aspects of cooperation between the Board of Grievances and the Egyptian Ministry of Justice.

== Scholarly participations ==
- Legitimacy and Administrative Justice Symposium, Riyadh.
- Disciplinary Justice Program, Tunisia.
- Decision-making and problem-solving program, Lebanon
- Conference on electronic documentation and archiving systems, the United States.
- Conference on “Justice and Investment: Stakes and Challenges,” Morocco.
