= Aspire Academy =

Sports academy in Qatar

- أكاديمية أسباير
- Interactive map of Aspire Academy
- Former names: ASPIRE Academy for Sports Excellence
- Location: Al Rayyan, Qatar
- Coordinates: 25.268071°N 51.443605°E

Construction
- Opened: 2004

Website
- aspire.qa

Aspire Academy (Arabic: أكاديمية أسباير, romanized: Akādīmiyat 'Asbāyr) is a sports academy based in the Aspire Zone in Qatar, founded in 2004 with the goal to scout and help develop Qatari athletes, whilst also providing them with secondary school education.

== History ==
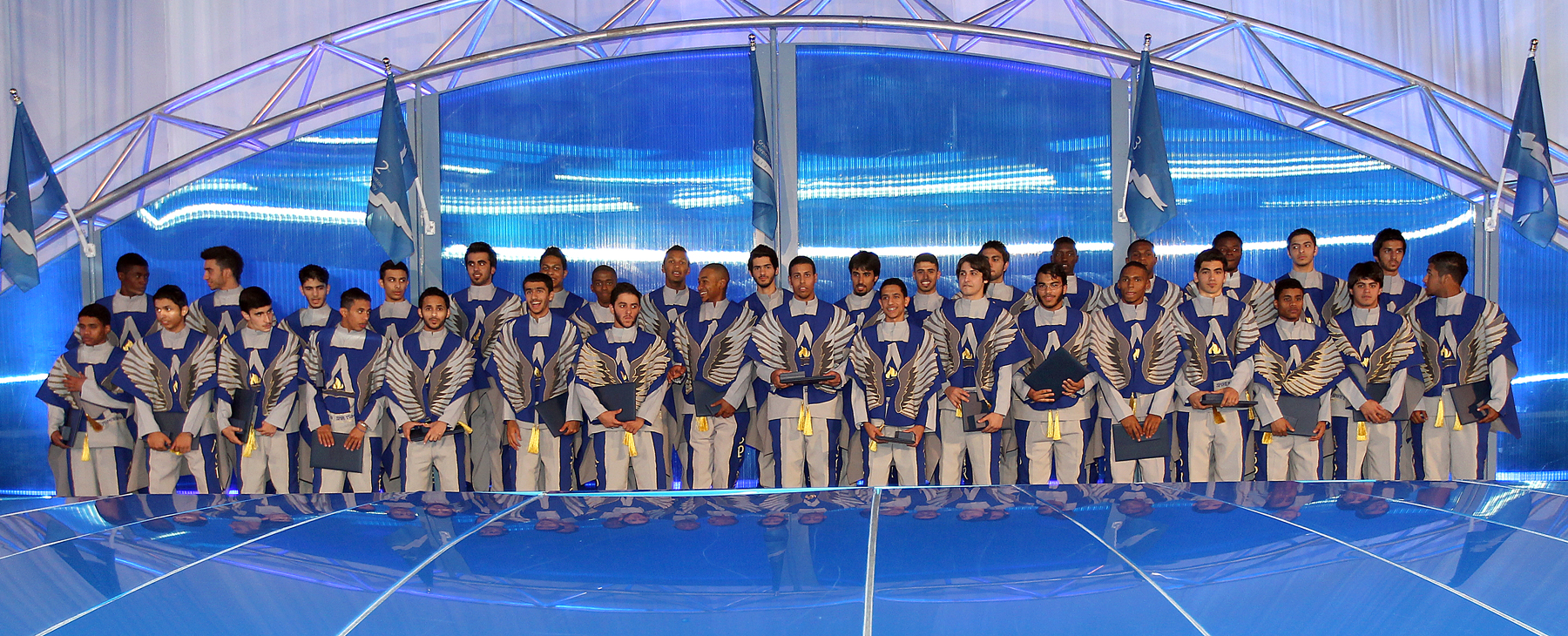
Aspire Academy graduates in 2012

Aspire Academy was established by an emiri decree, No. 16 of 2004, as an independent government-funded agency that reported directly to the Emir Sheikh Hamad Bin Khalifa Al-Thani through the heir apparent, Sheikh Tamim Bin Hamad Al-Thani.

Later, an emiri decree – no.1 of 2008 – incorporated the Aspire Academy as a strategic business unit (SBU) into the new, parent organization of Aspire Zone Foundation. Despite the switch from an independent government body to an SBU, the original purpose and objectives of the Aspire Academy remained the same.

On 17 November 2005, the Emir Sheikh Hamad Bin Khalifa Al-Thani led an opening ceremony of the Aspire Dome, essentially signaling the global announcement of Aspire Academy as an international institute of high standing. Over the years, it has received international recognition.

Aspire own Spanish team Cultural Leonesa and Belgian team K.A.S. Eupen. In August 2017, Spanish side Atlético Astorga announced links with Aspire Academy. The link up saw some Aspire based players join the club. As of 3 January 2018, Aspire also have an official partnership with Leeds United in England. They also have a satellite academy in the African country of Senegal.

In January 2019 and January 2020 the complex hosted the Match Premier Cup friendly tournament.

In September 2023, the Aspire Academy and Qatar Football Association (QFA) signed a cooperation agreement to further develop the coaching education system and enhance their joint expertise.

== Achievements ==
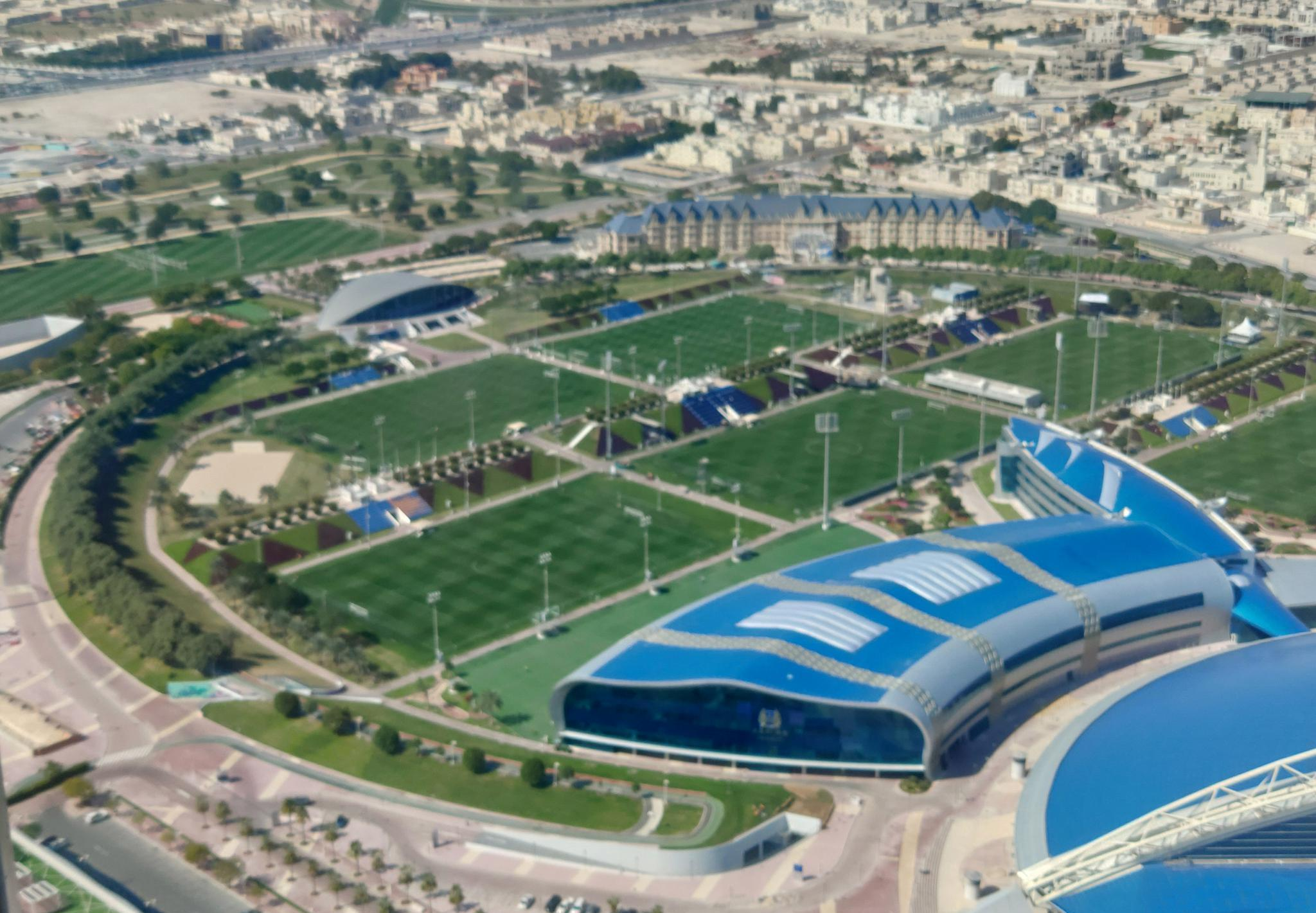
Aerial view of the Aspire Dome and the academy's football pitches

=== Football ===
In 2014, the Qatar U-19 national football team, composed solely of Aspire Academy student-athletes, won the 38th edition of the AFC U-19 Championship in Myanmar, for the first time in Qatar's history. With the same Aspire players, the senior side managed to win the nation's first ever AFC Asian Cup in the 2019 edition.

=== Athletics ===
- Mutaz Essa Barshim, high jumper, has been the 2014 World Indoor Champion, the 2017 and 2019 World Champion and a 2020 Summer Olympics gold medalist, besides holding the Asian record and second best outdoor high jump in history. set during the 2014 Diamond League.
- Abdulla Al-Tamimi, professional squash player, was also a footballer scouted by Al Sadd SC at the Aspire Academy, is the Qatari number 1 and the world number 18.
- Ashraf El Seify, hammer thrower, graduated from Aspire Academy in 2014, won a gold medal at the 2012 Asian Junior Athletics Championships and 2012 World Junior Athletics Championships setting a new World Junior Record and World Youth Best. In 2014, Ashraf became the 1st athlete to successfully defend his title at the IAAF World Junior Championships.

== See also ==
- Sport in Qatar
- Aspire Zone
- Aspire Dome
- Mahd Sports Academy
