= Sheikh Ibrahim Bin Abdullah Al-Ghaith =

Sheikh Ibrahim Bin Abdullah Al-Ghaith is the former General President for the Saudi Committee for the Promotion of Virtue and the Prevention of Vice.
