= Ahmed Al-Rajhi =

Saudi businessman and government minister (born 1967)

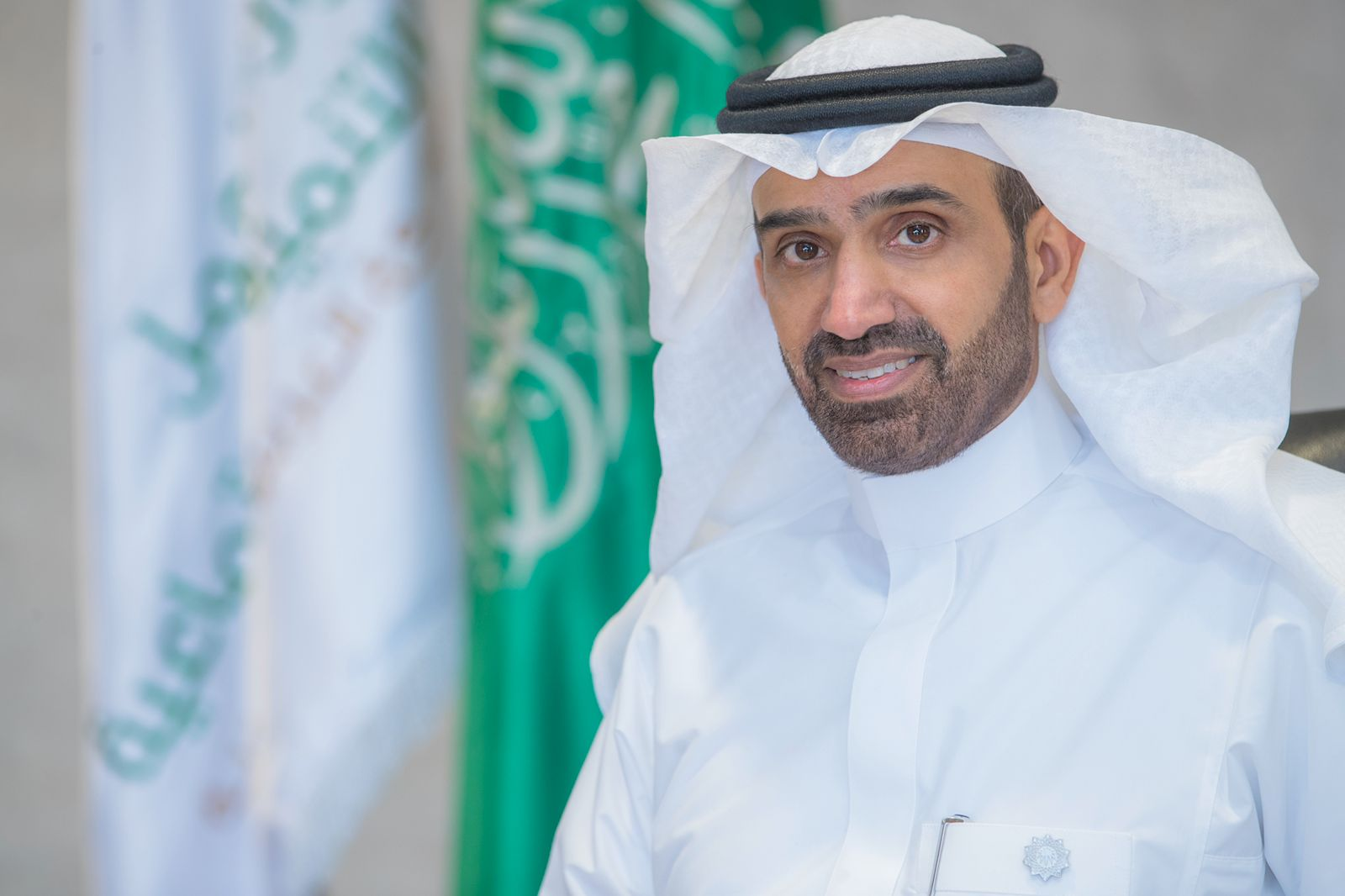

Ministry of Human Resources and Social Development
- Incumbent
- Assumed office 02 June 2018
- Monarch: Salman
- Preceded by: Ali Al-Ghafees

Personal details
- Born: 4 October 1967 (age 59) Riyadh, Saudi Arabia
- Parent: Sulayman ibn Abdul Aziz Al-Rajhi
- Education: King Fahd University of Petroleum and Minerals

Ahmed bin Suleiman bin Abdulaziz Al-Rajhi (Arabic: أحمد بن سليمان بن عبد العزيز الراجحي) is a Saudi politician, engineer, and businessman currently serving as the minister of human resources and social development in Saudi Arabia. He has held this position since June 2, 2018.

== Early life and education ==
Ahmed Al-Rajhi was born and raised in Riyadh, where he completed his primary and secondary education. He later pursued higher education at King Fahd University of Petroleum and Minerals in Dhahran, earning a bachelor's degree in industrial engineering. His academic background laid the foundation for his professional journey, which began in the industrial sector.

=== Career ===
Al-Rajhi started his professional career in the industrial sector, where he held several leadership positions. He later transitioned into entrepreneurship, founding and managing several successful companies operating at local, regional, and international levels. His expertise in business earned him key leadership roles in major organizations, including the Council of Saudi Chambers and the Riyadh Chamber of Commerce and Industry.

In addition to his business ventures, Al-Rajhi served as the first vice president of the Federation of GCC Chambers, where he contributed to regional economic cooperation. His leadership and contributions across various sectors paved the way for his appointment as minister of human resources and social development.

As the minister of human resources and social development, Al-Rajhi has overseen major reforms aimed at modernizing Saudi Arabia's labor market, improving social welfare programs, and advancing the goals of Saudi Vision 2030. His efforts include fostering private sector growth, enhancing workforce participation, and promoting social development initiatives.
