= Ministry of Human Resources and Social Development =

Government ministry of Saudi Arabia

Agency overview
- Formed: 1961
- Jurisdiction: Government of Saudi Arabia
- Headquarters: Riyadh, Saudi Arabia
- Agency executive: Ahmed Al-Rajhi, Minister
- Website: Official English Website

The Ministry of Human Resources and Social Development (HRSD; Arabic: وزارة الموارد البشرية والتنمية الاجتماعية) is a government ministry in Saudi Arabia. It was established in 2019 after merging Ministry of Labour and Social Development with Ministry of Civil Service. It is responsible for community development, as well as overseeing labor affairs. The current Minister is Ahmed al-Rajhi who was appointed in June 2018.

== History ==
The Ministry was established in 1961 under the name of the Ministry of Labor and Social Affairs. In 2004, The Ministry was separated into two independent ministries: the Ministry of Labor and the Ministry of Social Affairs. later, in 2015, the two ministers were merged into one ministry to become the Ministry of Labor and Social Development. In February 2020, a royal decree was issued to merge Ministry of Labour and Social Development with Ministry of Civil Service into a new ministry called Ministry of Human Resources and Social Development.

The deputy minister for civil services at the Ministry of Human Resources and Social Development is currently Mahir bin Abdulrahman Al-Gassim.

== The Mission ==
The mission of the Ministry in its current form, after integrating the civil service into labor and social development under the name of the Ministry of Human Resources and Social Development, focuses on:

1. Empowering individuals, societies, and institutions.
2. Promoting social responsibility.
3. Upgrading the labor market through developing policies and legislation.
4. Enabling the Ministry's employees to provide a distinctive experience to the customers that is in accordance with its vision of a vibrant, enabled society, and a distinguished work environment, towards an attractive labor market.

== Values ==
The Ministry's values are summarized in:

1. Focus on the beneficiaries.
2. Share.
3. Excellence.
4. Social Responsibility
5. Cooperation.

== Objectives ==
The Ministry's objectives stem from:

1. Increasing workforce participation and inclusiveness.
2. Supporting the labor market.
3. Increasing the non-profit sector's contribution to the national economy.
4. Shifting to effective policy development and system oversight.
5. Achieving operational excellence.
6. Improving the productivity and performance of the workforce.
7. Strengthening social safety nets and promoting self-reliance for families and individuals.
8. Rationalizing the wage bill in the government sector.
9. Building future human capabilities.
10. Achieving sustainable social development services.
11. Optimizing the customer experience.
12. Ensuring effective and comprehensive social welfare services.
13. Enabling the employment of Saudis.

== Roles and Responsibilities ==
The ministry supervises and organises labour and workers affairs in ministries and general government departments. In addition, the ministry is responsible for:

- Legislating the general policy for labour affairs in Saudi Arabia in accordance with Islamic principles and social justice.
- Researching and studying labour issues and problems within the framework of economic and social development plans and projects in partnership with the competent authorities in the Kingdom.
- Developing plans and drawing up policies related to the employment of Saudis and the Saudization of jobs in public and private sectors.
- Drawing up policies related to labour inspection, monitoring the implementation of the labour system and guiding employers to the requirements of its texts.
- Establishing a database for the labour market in the Kingdom that includes data on workers in the private sector, whether Saudis or non-Saudis.
- Follow up on the implementation of projects and programs related to work affairs and strive to achieve common goals in this regard in cooperation with the competent state agencies, considering the competencies and powers entrusted to each of them.
- Preparing and implementing labour statistical research and publishing its results in agreement with the Department of Statistics and Information.

== Recruitment Strategy ==
The Ministry of Human Resources and Social Development has developed an employment strategy that was approved by the Saudi Council of Ministers in 2009. This strategy is based on providing sufficient job opportunities in terms of number, and appropriate in terms of pay, leading to full employment of Saudi human resources, and achieving a competitive advantage for the national economy. It set 25 years to achieve a group of goals. First, a short-term goal which is to control unemployment for a period of two years. Second, a medium-term goal which is to reduce the unemployment rate for a period of three years. Finally, a long-term goal, which is to achieve a competitive advantage for the economy, depending on the national manpower, for a period of twenty years.

== Improving the contractual relationship and "Kafala" the sponsorship system ==
In March 2021, the actual activation of abolishing the sponsorship system began within the initiative to improve the contractual relationship and develop the work environment as it allows expatriate workers enjoy job mobility and freedom to enter and exit the Kingdom without the need for an employer's permission. The new conditions also include stipulations that will allow migrant workers to transfer to other jobs upon the expiry of their work contract without the need for their former employer's approval. The kafala system in Saudi Arabia previously tied workers to their employers, or sponsors, who are responsible for the employees' visa and legal status. The new law limited the relationship between employers and expatriate workers under the system, who primarily work in construction and domestic work.

== See also ==
- Ministries of Saudi Arabia
- Foreign workers in Saudi Arabia
- Saudi Human Resources Development Fund
