= Mohammad bin Abdulmalik Al-Sheikh =

Saudi government minister and lawyer

Mohammad Bin Abdul Malek Al ash-Shaikh is a Saudi minister of state and a member of the Council of Economic and Development Affairs. He is currently one of four Al ash-Shaikhs serving in King Salman’s Government.

Mohammad Bin Abdul Malek was born in Riyadh in 1969. He earned a bachelor's degree from Umm Al Qura University and a master's degree in law from Harvard University. Between 1998 and 2001, he was a lawyer for the World Bank in Washington, D.C, and then went into private practice in New York at White & Case between 2001 and 2003. He returned to Saudi in 2003 when he opened his own practice. In September 2012, he was designated as the Saudi Arabian Government’s representative at the World Bank, and in February 2013 was appointed chairman of the Capital Market Authority (Saudi Arabia) (CMA), the formal name of the Saudi stock market regulator.
