= Al Yamamah Palace =

Residence and Court for the King of Saudi Arabia

- قصر اليمامة
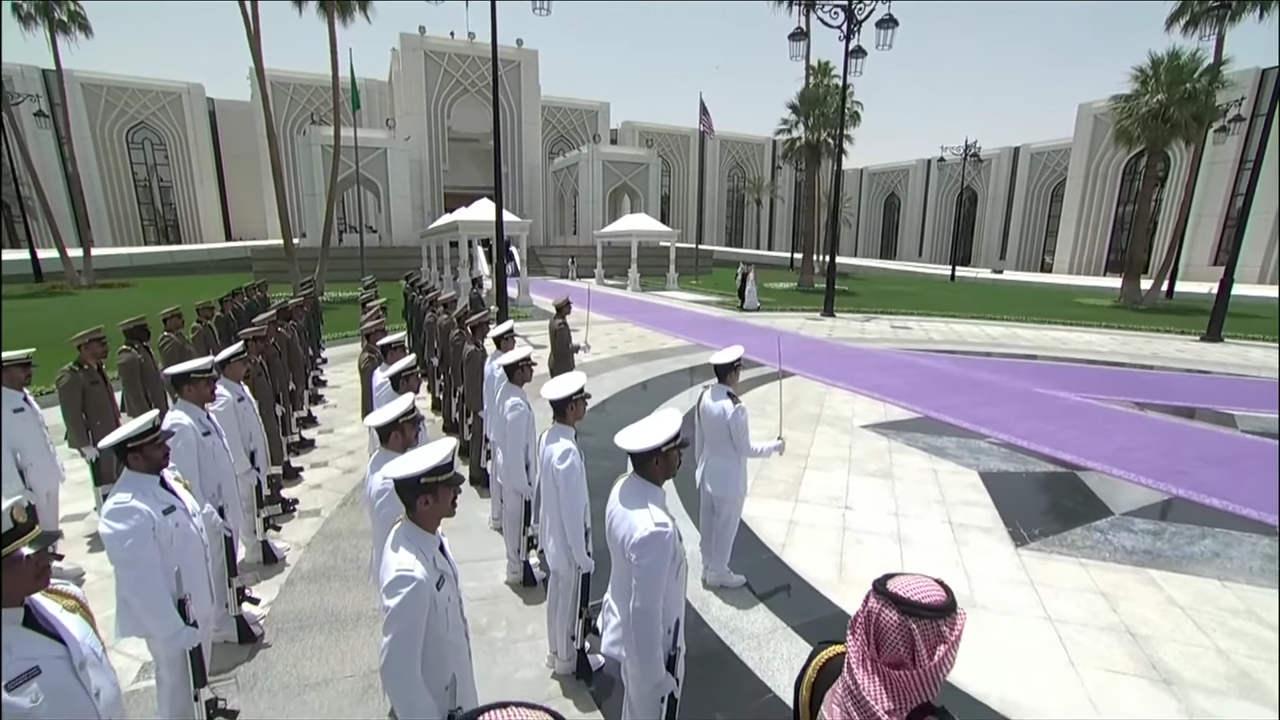
- Al Yamamah Palace during a state visit in 2025

General information
- Location: Riyadh, Saudi Arabia
- Coordinates: 24°39′46″N 46°38′11″E
- Opened: 1988

Al Yamamah Palace (Arabic: قصر اليمامة) is the official workplace and residence of the King of Saudi Arabia and the seat of the royal court since 1988. Named after the historic al-Yamama region, the palace is located in the al-Hada district of northwestern Riyadh and was built in 1988 during the reign of King Fahd bin Abdulaziz. It is the main place to receive the country's senior guests, and also the headquarters for drafting royal decrees. The palace is made of Italian marble floors and intricately carved ceiling and wall panels. King Salman chairs weekly government meetings in the building and often welcomes foreign dignitaries and other VIPs to the palace.

== Gallery ==
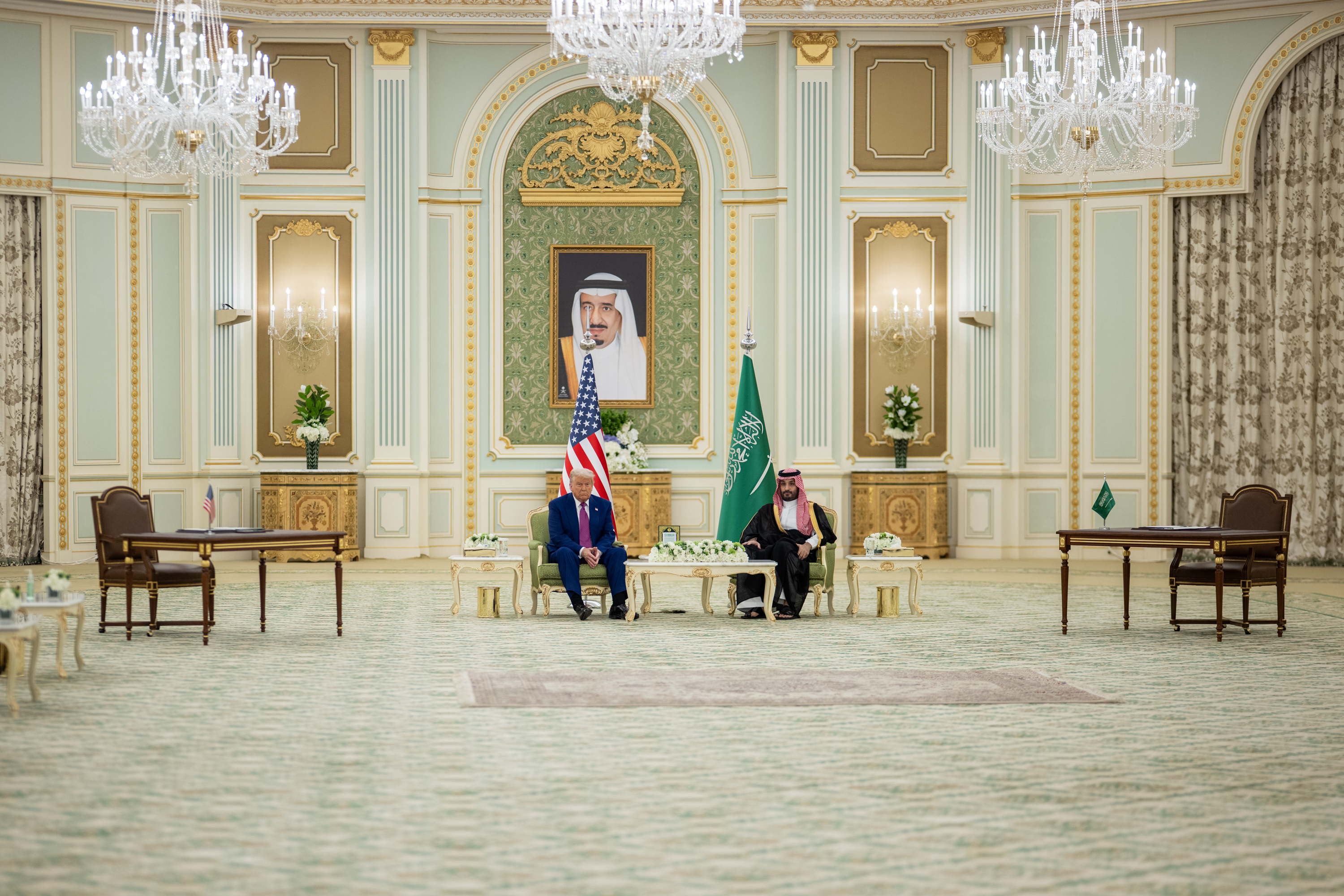
Crown Prince Mohammed Bin Salman and US President Donald Trump in Al Yamamah Palace

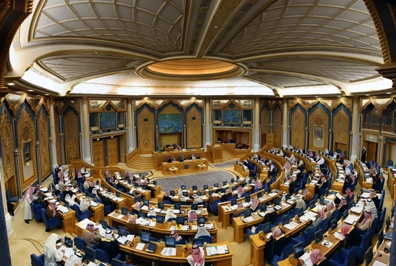
The Consultative Assembly of Saudi Arabia is based in Al Yamamah Palace
