= Yousef Al-Benyan =

Saudi Arabian business executive and Minister of Education

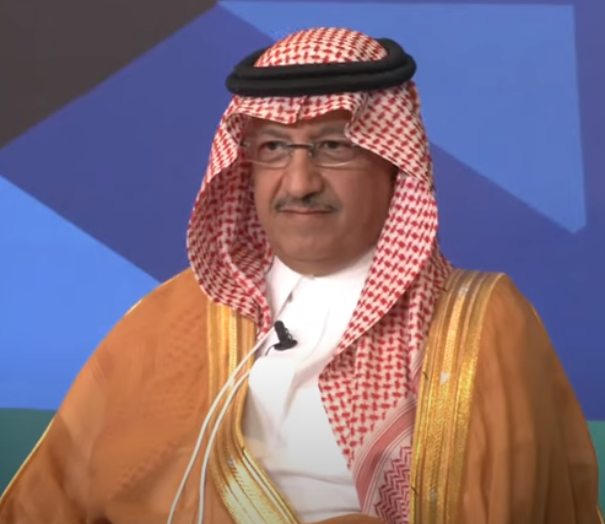
- Al-Benyan at the World Economic Forum Growth Summit (2023)

Minister of Education
- Incumbent
- Assumed office 27 September 2022
- Monarch: King Salman
- Preceded by: Hamad Al-Sheikh

Personal details
- Born: November 20, 1962 (age 63) Riyadh, Saudi Arabia
- Education: King Saud University (BSc Economics); IMD Business School (executive programmes); University of Michigan – Ross School of Business (executive education)
- Occupation: Business executive • politician
- Awards: Gulf CEO of the Year (2018)

Yousef bin Abdullah Al-Benyan (يوسف بن عبد الله البنيان; born 20 November 1962) is a Saudi Arabian business executive and government official who has served as the kingdom's Minister of Education since September 2022.
