= Emblem of Saudi Arabia =

National emblem

Emblem of Saudi Arabia شعار السعودية
- Armiger: Salman, King of Saudi Arabia
- Adopted: 1950; 76 years ago
- Shield: A palm tree vert, two swords in saltire argent hilted or in base

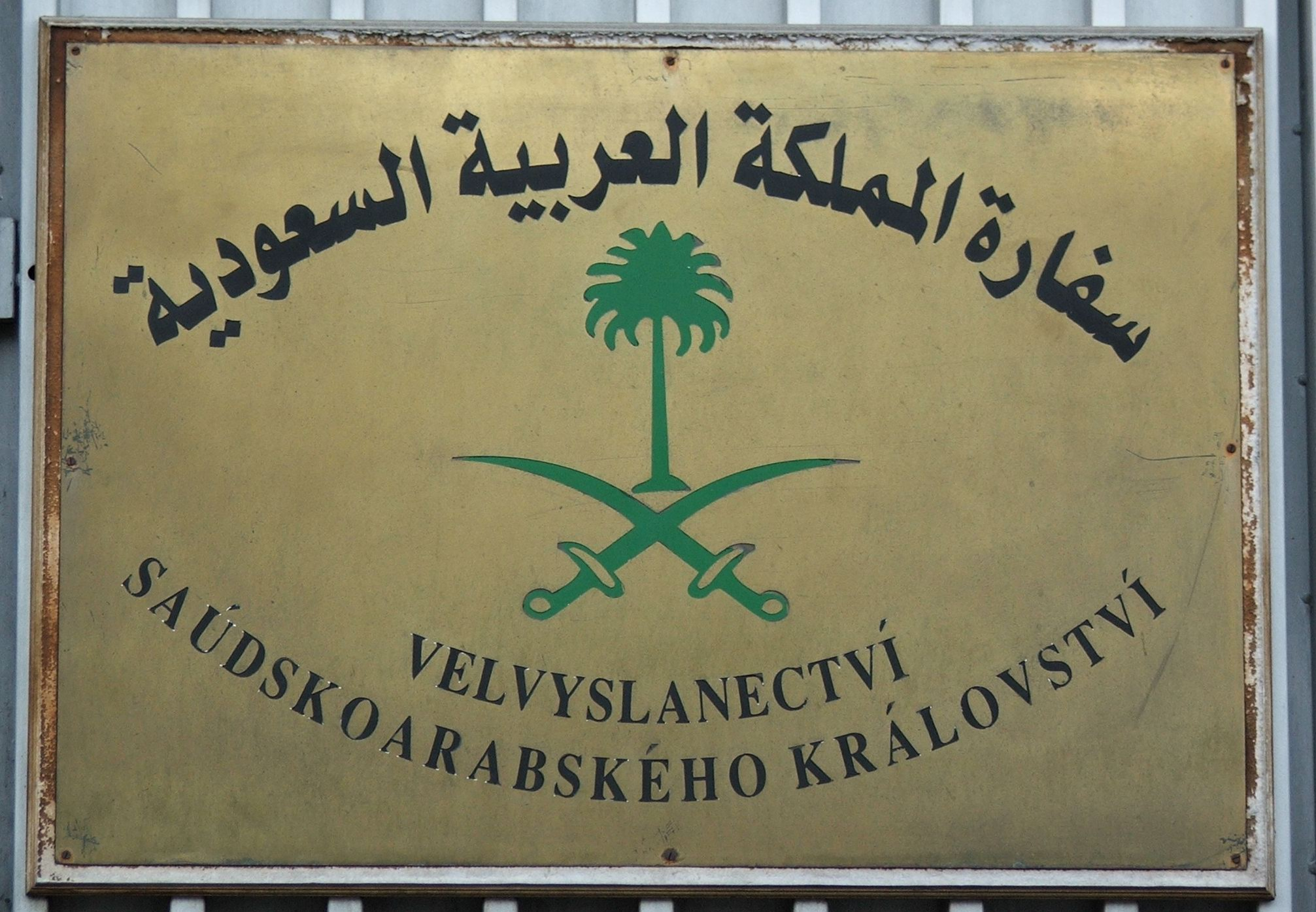
The emblem of Saudi Arabia at the Saudi Arabian Embassy in Prague, Czech Republic.

The Emblem of Saudi Arabia (شعار السعودية) was adopted in 1950. According to the Saudi Basic Law, it consists of two crossed swords with a palm tree in the space above and between the blades.

The two swords represent the Kingdom of Hejaz and the Sultanate of Nejd and its dependencies, which were united under Ibn Saud in 1926, or strength, stamina, and sacrifice.

The crest represents that prosperity can only be had through justice.

The palm stands for growth, vitality, and prosperity and the crossed swords represent justice. The palm tree represents the Kingdom's assets which are defined as its people, heritage, history, and resources natural and non-natural. Thus, the palm is shown to be guarded by the two swords, which represent the forces to be used in defence of the nation.

== Historical emblems ==
Coat of arms of the Kingdom of Hejaz from 1920 to 1925

Coat of arms of the Kingdom of Hejaz and Nejd from 1926 to 1932

Seal of Saudi Arabia from 1932 to 1950

== Usage ==
Passport with the coat of arms of Saudi Arabia

The emblem appears on government documents, diplomatic missions, as well as several Saudi Arabian flags. It is emblazoned in gold on the flag of the Armed Forces of Saudi Arabia (which is also the Kingdom's war ensign), and on the lower hoist of the royal standard. The latter is essentially the national flag with the added emblem in gold, which is placed in the lower part of the (left-facing) hoist and not in the canton as with other royal standards. The emblem's lower position is in deference to the sacred nature of the Shahada, the Islamic creed.

The emblem also forms a prominent part of state airline Saudia’s branding, being featured on the tail fins of the airline's fleet.

== See also ==
- National symbols of Saudi Arabia
