= Abdulaziz bin Turki Al-Faisal =

Saudi racing driver and royal (born 1983)

His Royal Highness Abdulaziz bin Turki Al-Faisal
- عبد العزيز بن تركي آل سعود
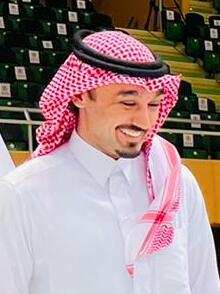
- Abdulaziz in 2022

Minister of Sport
- Incumbent
- Assumed office 25 February 2020
- Monarch: Salman
- Prime Minister: Salman (2020–2022); Mohammad bin Salman (2022–present)
- Preceded by: Office established

Personal details
- Born: 4 June 1983 (age 43) Riyadh, Saudi Arabia
- Parents: Turki bin Faisal Al Saud (father); Nouf bint Fahd bin Khalid Al Saud (mother)
- Education: King Saud University; SOAS University of London
- Categorisation: FIA Silver

Abdulaziz bin Turki bin Faisal bin Abdulaziz Al Saud (Arabic: عبد العزيز بن تركي آل سعود, ‘Abd al-‘Azīz bin Turkī Āl Su‘ūd) (born 4 June 1983), also known as Abdulaziz bin Turki Al Faisal, is a former Saudi racing driver and businessman as well as a member of the House of Saud. Prince Abdulaziz is the Minister of Sports appointed by King Salman with a royal decree on 25 February 2020.

== Early life and education ==
Prince Abdulaziz was born on 4 June 1983 in Riyadh. He is the second son of Turki bin Faisal Al Saud, the brother of Faisal bin Turki, a grandson of King Faisal of Saudi Arabia, and the great-grandson of Ibn Saud, the founder of Saudi Arabia.

He claims that he learned to drive at nine years old. His father allowed him behind the wheel of a grey Nissan Patrol, which he drove around in the sand.

Abdulaziz bin Turki graduated from King Faisal School, Riyadh, in 2000. He went to study politics at King Saud University from 2001 to 2003. He continued to study politics at School of Oriental and African Studies (SOAS), University of London, from 2003 to 2006. He studied marketing at College of Business Administration (Saudi Arabia), Jeddah beginning in 2006 and graduated in 2010. He also graduated from the Formula BMW school in Bahrain in 2005.

== Motorsport career ==
Abdulaziz Al Faisal's early motorsport career includes the following races:

- Formula BMW racing centre race series (2005 – 2006): (Contested) One race, one pole position, first place.
- Formula BMW racing centre race series (2006 – 2007): Eight races out of nine, four pole positions, four wins, finished third on the championship.
- Speed trip 7 Bahrain (2006 – 2007): Second overall autocross championship.

In 2010, Abdulaziz bin Turki participated and won several places in the following races: Radical Masters AUH round: 2nd Place; Porsche GT3 CCME Champion 9 wins and 12 podium finishes. The races he participated in 2011 are as follows: 24h Dubai Race with Saudi Falcons, 5th place; Lotus T125 F1 testing in Abudhabi; Porsche GT3 CCME 2nd overall with Most fastest Laps and Most Pole positions; 24h LeMans Official Testing with Porsche Factory Support Team; Hungaroring BMW Z4 GT3 testing; FIA GT3 Championship – 1st place in Algarve Portugal with Team Need for Speed by Schubert Motorsport.

Abdulaziz Al Faisal won the championship title in the first GT3 European championship round organized in the Algarve International Circuit in Portugal in May 2011. He came first with his co-pilot Edward Sandström on a BMW Z4 on the Need for Speed Schubert team. With this success, Abdulaziz Turki became the first Saudi to participate and win a GT3 European championship race.

His most frequent co-pilots were Edward Sandström (6), Nick Tandy (2), Bryce Miller (2), Bret Curtis (1), Sean Edwards (1) and Spencer Pumpelly (1) until 2012.

The Saudi Falcons, led by him, did not participate in 24H Dubai 2013 due to several unexpected mechanical problems.

=== Racing career summary ===
His racing career summary is as follows:

Year	No of races	Wins	Podium	Pole position	No of fastest race
2013	13 races	2 wins	11 podiums	1 pole positions	4 fastest race lap
2012	16 races	4 wins	12 podiums	2 pole positions	2 fastest race lap
2011	22 races	7 wins	10 podiums	6 pole positions	7 fastest race laps
2010	17 races	9 wins	13 podiums	6 pole positions	6 fastest race laps
2009	8 races	1 win	1 podium	0 pole positions	0 fastest race laps
2008	1 race	0 win	1 podium	0 pole positions	0 fastest race laps

Races entered: 79; Wins: 23; Podiums: 48; Pole positions: 16; Fastest laps: 19; Race win percentage: 29.11% (Data updated as of 25 March 2013)

=== Racing career highlights ===
- Le Mans 24h with Porsche RSR Factory Support Team, 2012
- Winner of Porsche GT3 Cup Challenge Me Championship for the second time, 2012
- Fourth in 24H Dubai race, 2012
- Third in ADAC GT Masters Round 4 in June 2012
- Second in Porsche GT3 Cup Challenge Middle East, 2010–11.
- Second in 24H Series, A5 2010.
- Middle Eastern Porsche GT3 Cup Challenge champion 2009–10.
- Third in Formula BMW Bahrain 2007.
- See also: 2011 FIA GT3 European Championship season and Porsche GT3 Middle East Championship

=== ADAC GT Masters ===
Abdulaziz Al Faisal was the only Arab driver racing in the ADAC GT Masters in June 2012, one of the world's biggest GT3 championships. He achieved significant success during his first participation in one of the most important GT3 races of the ADAC GT Masters, Rounds 3 and 4 of the championship at Sachsenring circuit in Germany with Schubert Motorsport Team in June 2012. Abdulaziz finished 3rd among 44 cars on the starting grid of Round 4.

=== Complete 24 Hours of Le Mans results ===
Abdulaziz participated in Complete 24 Hours of Le Mans together with Sean Edwards and Bret Curtis in June 2012. They managed to qualify the #75 Porsche 997 GT3 RSR a remarkable second in the Pro-Am category in the race.

Year	Team	Co-Drivers	Car	Class	Laps	Pos.	Class Pos.
2011	(Germany) Team Felbermayr-Proton	(United States) Bryce Miller (United Kingdom) Nick Tandy	Porsche 997 GT3-RSR	GTE; Pro	169	DNF	DNF
2012	(Belgium) Prospeed Competition	(United States) Bret Curtis (United Kingdom) Sean Edwards	Porsche 997 GT3-RSR	GTE; Am	180	DNF	DNF
2013	(United Kingdom) JMW Motorsport	(Italy) Andrea Bertolini (United Arab Emirates) Khaled Al Qubaisi	Ferrari 458 Italia GT2	GTE; Pro	300	34th	10th
2014	(United Kingdom) JMW Motorsport	(United States) Seth Neiman (United States) Spencer Pumpelly	Ferrari 458 Italia GT2	GTE; Am	327	27th	7th
2015	(United Kingdom) JMW Motorsport	(Poland) Jakub Giermaziak (United States) Michael Avenatti	Ferrari 458 Italia GT2	GTE; Am	320	36th	7th
2017	(Germany) Proton Competition	(United States) Patrick Long (United States) Mike Hedlund	Porsche 911 RSR	GTE; Am	329	37th	9th

== Awards and recognition ==
APSCO, the dealer of Mobil 1 oil in Saudi Arabia, presented an honorary shield to Abdulaziz Al Faisal - the leader of the Saudi Racing team - at Reem International Circuit in Riyadh in 2010. His team received the award for winning 1st place nine times at the Porsche GT3 Middle East Championship, a record number, as well as winning the title of the first edition of this championship. The championship was held over a period of six months on the most famous Arab racing circuits in Bahrain, Saudi Arabia, and the UAE. APSCO was a major sponsor of the championship.

Abdulaziz bin Turki was named as ambassador for Road Safety in Shell's 2013 road safety programme in Saudi Arabia. In February 2019, he was appointed president of the Saudi Arabian Olympic Committee. In August 2020, Arabian Business deemed Abdulaziz as one of the most powerful people in Saudi Arabia.

Abdulaziz bin Turki is the chairman of the Riyadh 2030 committee which won the bid for the 2034 Asian Games.

Sporting positions
Preceded by Inaugural	Porsche Carrera Cup Middle East; Champion; 2010	Succeeded by Salman Al-Khalifa
Preceded by Salman Al-Khalifa	Porsche Carrera Cup Middle East; Champion; 2012	Succeeded by Clemens Schmid
