= King of Saudi Arabia =

Head of state

- ملك المملكة العربية السعودية
- Royal Standard of Saudi Arabia

Incumbent
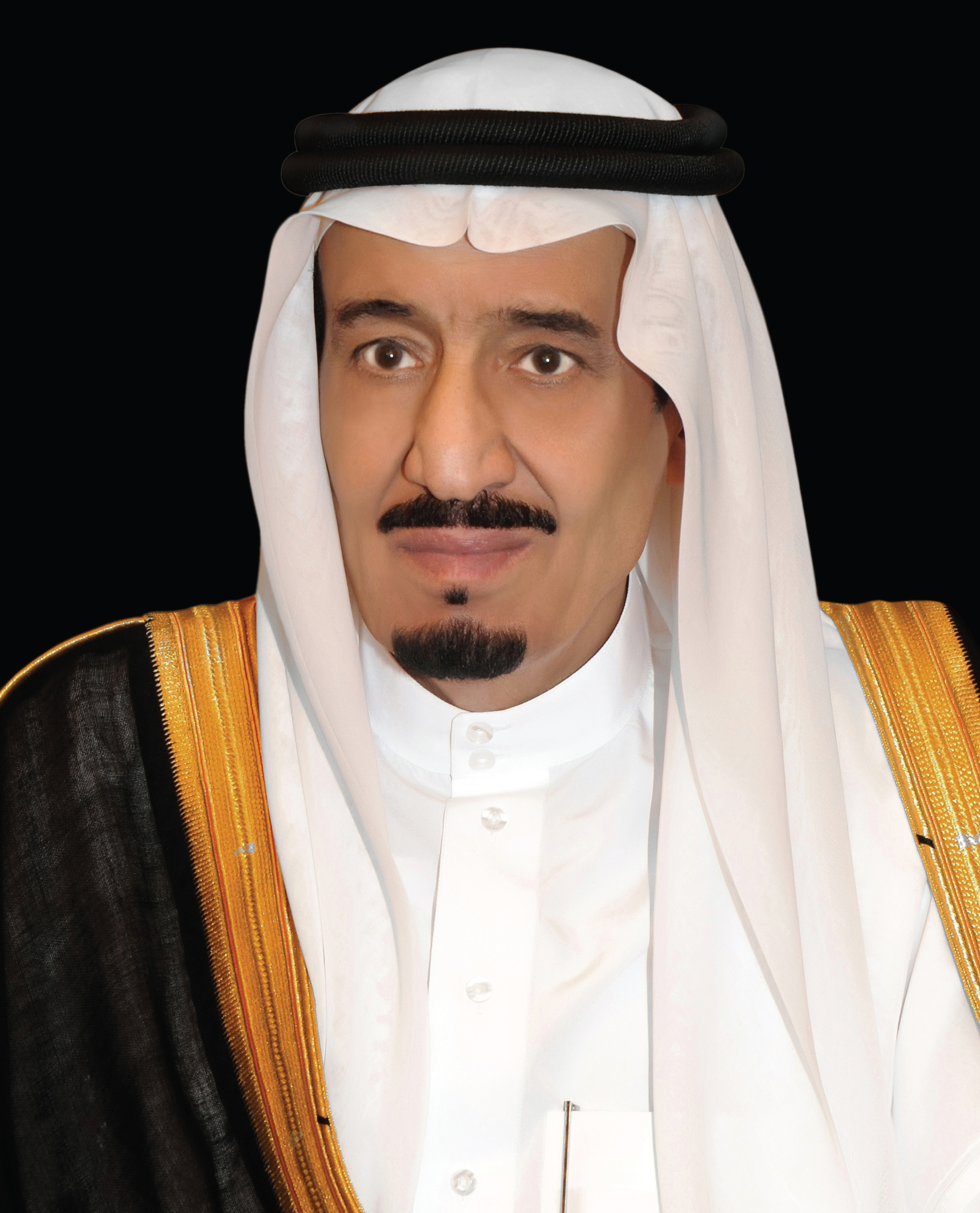
- Salman bin Abdulaziz Al Saud since 23 January 2015

Details
- Style: The Custodian of the Two Holy Mosques
- Heir apparent: Mohammad bin Salman Al Saud
- First monarch: Abdulaziz Al Saud
- Formed: 23 September 1932; 94 years ago
- Residences: Al-Yamamah Palace (Riyadh); Al-Safa Palace (Mecca); Al-Salam Palace (Jeddah); Tayibah Palace (Medina); Al-Aziziya Palace (Dammam)

The King of the Kingdom of Saudi Arabia (Note: (Arabic: ملك المملكة العربية السعودية, romanized: Malik al-Mamlakah al-ʿArabiyyah as-Suʿūdiyyah)) is the head of state of Saudi Arabia, who holds absolute power. He is the head of the Saudi Arabian royal family, the House of Saud. The king is the commander-in-chief of the Saudi Arabian Armed Forces and the head of the Saudi national honors system. The king is called the "Custodian of the Two Holy Mosques" (Arabic: خادم الحرمين الشريفين, romanized: Khadim al-Haramayn aš-Šarīfayn), a title that signifies Saudi Arabia's jurisdiction over the mosques of Masjid al-Haram in Mecca and Al-Masjid an-Nabawi in Medina. The title has been used many times through the history of Islam. The first Saudi king to use the title was Faisal; however, King Khalid did not use the title after him. In 1986, King Fahd replaced "His Majesty" with the title of Custodian of the Two Holy Mosques, and it has been since used by both King Abdullah and King Salman. The king has been named the most powerful and influential Muslim and Arab leader in the world according to The Muslim 500.

Styles of The King of Saudi Arabia
- Reference style: His Majesty
- Spoken style: Custodian of the Two Holy Mosques

== History ==
King Abdulaziz Al Saud, known in the West as Ibn Saud, regained his patrimony, which is known as today's Saudi Arabia, in 1902. Restoring his family as emirs of the Emirate of Riyadh, he then established the Sultanate of Nejd as his headquarters in 1922. Following the establishment of Riyadh as the capital of his state, Ibn Saud then captured Hejaz in 1925.

Ibn Saud proclaimed his dominions as the Sultanate of Nejd in 1921, shortly before completing the unification of the region. He was proclaimed king (malik) of Hejaz in 1926, and raised Nejd to a kingdom as well in 1927. For the next five years, Ibn Saud administered the two parts of his realm, the Kingdom of Hejaz and Nejd, as separate units. On 23 September 1932, he formally united his territories into the Kingdom of Saudi Arabia.

== Succession ==
The kings since Ibn Saud's death have all been his sons, and all likely immediate successors to the reigning King Salman will be from among his progeny. This makes the Saudi monarchy quite distinct from Western monarchies, which usually feature large, clearly defined royal families and orders of succession, and use the primogeniture system of succession. Muhammad bin Nayef was the first grandson of Ibn Saud to be in the line of succession before being deposed from the position of Crown Prince by a royal decree in 2017.

== Other functions ==
The king of Saudi Arabia is also considered the head of the House of Saud and, until 2021, the prime minister. The crown prince was also the "deputy prime minister" until 2021 and is currently prime minister. The kings after Faisal have named a "second deputy prime minister" as the subsequent heir after the crown prince.

== Opposition ==
Criticism of the king, religious leaders, or government is not allowed and can generally mean jail time for the critics. It can also result in death.

== Kings of Saudi Arabia (1932–present) ==
Name	Lifespan	Reign start	Reign end	Notes	Family	Image
Abdulaziz: Ibn Saud; عبد العزيز	15 January 1876 – 9 November 1953 (aged 77)	23 September 1932 (aged 57)	9 November 1953 (death by natural causes)	Reign established by conquest Son of Imam Abdul Rahman and Sara bint Ahmed Al Sudairi	Saud	Ibn Saud of Saudi Arabia
Saud: سعود	15 January 1902 – 23 February 1969 (aged 67)	9 November 1953 (aged 51)	2 November 1964 (abdicated)	Son of King Abdulaziz and Wadha bint Muhammad Al Orair	Saud	Saud of Saudi Arabia
Faisal: فيصل	14 April 1906 – 25 March 1975 (aged 68)	2 November 1964 (aged 58)	25 March 1975 (assassinated)	Son of King Abdulaziz and Tarfa bint Abdullah Al Sheikh	Saud	Faisal of Saudi Arabia
Khalid: خالد	13 February 1913 – 13 June 1982 (aged 69)	25 March 1975 (aged 62)	13 June 1982 (death by natural causes)	Son of King Abdulaziz and Al Jawhara bint Musaed Al Saud	Saud	Khalid of Saudi Arabia
Fahd: فهد	16 March 1920; 16 March 1921; 16 March 1923 – 1 August 2005 (aged 82) – 1 August 2005 (aged 85)	13 June 1982 (aged 61)	1 August 2005 (death by natural causes)	Son of King Abdulaziz and Hussa bint Ahmed Al Sudairi	Saud	Fahd of Saudi Arabia
Abdullah: عبد الله	1 August 1924 – 23 January 2015 (aged 90)	1 August 2005 (aged 81)	23 January 2015 (death by natural causes)	Son of King Abdulaziz and Fahda bint Asi Al Shammari	Saud	Abdullah of Saudi Arabia
Salman: سلمان	31 December 1935 (age 90)	23 January 2015 (aged 79)	Incumbent	Son of King Abdulaziz and Hussa bint Ahmed Al Sudairi	Saud	Salman of Saudi Arabia

=== Current heir-apparent ===
- Crown Prince: Mohammed bin Salman Al Saud, born 31 August 1985 (age 41); son of King Salman and Fahda bint Falah Al Hithlain.

== Royal Standard ==
The Royal Standard consists of a green flag, with an Arabic inscription and a sword featured in white, and with the national emblem embroidered in gold in the lower right canton of the year 1973.

Royal Standard of the King
(Ratio: 2:3)

Royal Standard of the King
(Ratio: 1:1)

The script on the flag is written in the Thuluth script. It is the shahada or Islamic declaration of faith:

لَا إِلٰهَ إِلَّا الله مُحَمَّدٌ رَسُولُ الله
lā ʾilāha ʾillā-llāh, muhammadun rasūlu-llāh
There is no god but God: Muhammad is the Messenger of God.

- The Royal Standard consists of a green flag, in the center of the national emblem embroidered with gold.
Royal Standard of the King (1938–1953)
(Ratio: 2:3)

Royal Standard of the King (1938–1953)
(Ratio: 12:25)

Royal Standard of the King (1938–1953)
(Ratio: 1:1)

Royal Standard of the King (1953–1964)
(Ratio: 2:3)

Royal Standard of the King (1953–1964)
(Ratio: 1:1)

Royal Standard of the King (1964–1973)
(Ratio: 2:3)

Royal Standard of the King (1964–1973)
(Ratio: 1:1)

== See also ==
- History of Saudi Arabia
- List of Saudi rulers
