= Saudi Royal Court =

Saudi Arabian government organization

- الديوان الملكي السعودي
- Emblem of Saudi Arabia
- Established: 1932
- Location: Riyadh, Saudi Arabia

Chief
- Currently: Fahd bin Mohammed bin Saleh Al-Issa

The Saudi Royal Court is the principal executive office of the King of Saudi Arabia. It serves as the main liaison between the King and the government institutions.

== History ==
The current Saudi judicial system was created by King Abdulaziz, who founded the Kingdom of Saudi Arabia in 1932, and was introduced to the country in stages between 1927 and 1960. Courts at three levels were established in Hijaz by a royal decree in 1927 i.e. Summary Courts, High Courts, and Subordinate Courts (both types are ordinary courts), and Judicial Control Body (Appellate Court).

== Function ==
The Royal Court oversees the offices of the King's advisors on domestic policy, religious affairs, international relations, national security, and royal protocol, in addition to the King's private office. The King conducts most routine government affairs from this office, including drafting regulations and royal decrees. The Royal Court is currently headed by Fahd bin Mohammed bin Saleh Al-Issa.
