= Royal Commission for Makkah City and Holy Sites =

Saudi commission for services at Mecca

Agency overview
- Formed: 2 June 2018
- Jurisdiction: Saudi Arabia
- Headquarters: Makkah, Saudi Arabia
- Agency executives: Prince Mohammed bin Salman, Chairman; Saleh bin Ibrahim Al-Rasheed, Chief Executive Officer
- Website: https://www.rcmc.gov.sa/

The Royal Commission for Makkah City and Holy Sites is a Saudi commission that was established on 2 June 2018 by a royal decree issued by Saudi Arabia's King Salman. The commission is responsible for the improvement of services as well as the establishment of a sustainable system at the Grand Mosque in Makkah and the holy sites.

== Board of directors ==
A board of directors governs the commission under the chairmanship of the President of the Council of Ministers and membership appointed by the Prime Minister of the Council of Ministers. The members of the commission are:

Royal Commission for Makkah City and Holy Sites Members
Prince Mohammed bin Salman	Crown Prince, Prime Minister, Chairman
Prince Khaled Al-Faisal	Governor of Makkah region, Member
Prince Saud bin Mishaal bin Abdulaziz	Deputy Governor of Makkah Region, Member
Prince Abdulaziz bin Saud Al Saud	Minister of Interior, Member
Prince Abdullah bin Bandar bin Abdulaziz	Minister of the National Guard, Member
Dr. Tawfiq bin Fawzan Al-Rabiah	Minister of Haj and Umrah, Member
Dr. Majid bin Abdullah Al-Qasabi	Minister of Commerce, Member
Ahmed bin Aqeel Al-Khatib	Minister of Tourism, Member
Eng. Abdulrahman bin Abdulmohsen Al-Fadhli	Minister of Environment, Water and Agriculture, Member
Mohammed bin Abdullah Al-Jadaan	Minister of Finance, Member
Saleh bin Nasser Al-Jasser	Minister of Transport and Logistics Services, Member
Faisal bin Fadel Al-Ibrahim	Minister of Economy and Planning, Member
Mohammed bin Mazid Al-Tuwaijri	Advisor at the Royal Court, Member
Yasir Bin Othman Al-Rumayyan	Governor of the Public Investment Fund, Member
Ibrahim Al-Sultan	Advisor at the Royal Court, Member
Fahd Bin Abdullah Tunisi	Advisor at the Royal Court, Member
Musaed bin Abdulaziz Al-Daoud	Holy Makkah Mayor, Member
