= Ministry of Economy and Planning (Saudi Arabia) =

Government ministry of Saudi Arabia

- وزارة الاقتصاد والتخطيط

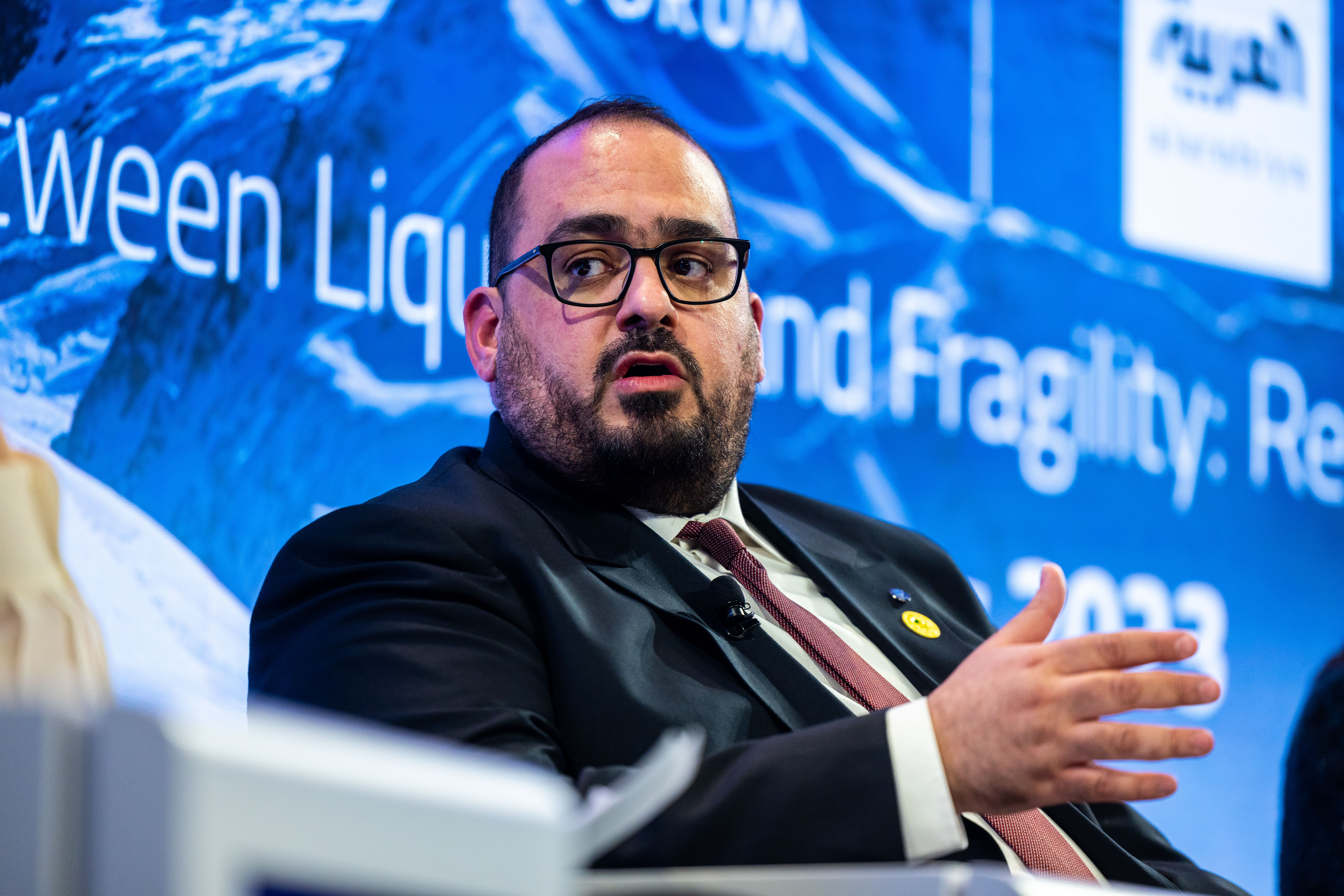
- Faisal F. Alibrahim, the current Minister of Economy and Planning since 3 May 2021

Agency overview
- Formed: 13 October 1975; 50 years ago
- Preceding agencies: Ministry of Economy (1953 – 1954); Supreme Council for Planning (1959 – 1964); Central Planning Organization (1964 – 1975)
- Jurisdiction: Government of Saudi Arabia
- Headquarters: Riyadh
- Minister responsible: Faisal F. Alibrahim
- Child agency: General Authority for Statistics
- Website: www.mep.gov.sa/en

The Ministry of Economy and Planning (Arabic: وزارة الاقتصاد والتخطيط) is a government ministry in Saudi Arabia responsible for developing and implementing plans that guide the country’s long-term growth.

== History ==
The Ministry of Economy was established in 1953 and merged the following year, in 1954, with the Ministry of Finance to form the Ministry of Finance and National Economy. In 1959, the Supreme Council for Planning was created to oversee national planning functions. It was replaced in 1964 by the Central Planning Authority. In 1975, the Central Planning Authority was transferred to the Ministry of Planning, consolidating planning responsibilities within a single ministry. In 2000, responsibility for economic affairs was transferred from the Ministry of Finance and National Economy to the Ministry of Planning. In 2003, the Ministry of Planning was renamed the Ministry of Economy and Planning.

== List of ministers ==
No.	Portrait	Minister	Took office	Left office	Time in office
Ministers of Planning (1975–2003)
1		Hisham Nazer	13 October 1975	2 August 1991	15 years, 293 days
2		Abdul Wahhab Attar	2 August 1991	16 June 1999	7 years, 318 days
3		Khalid Al-Qusaibi	16 June 1999	30 April 2003	3 years, 318 days
Ministers of Economy and Planning (2003–present)
1		Khalid Al-Qusaibi	30 April 2003	13 December 2011	8 years, 227 days
2		Muhammed Al-Jasser	13 December 2011	29 April 2015	3 years, 137 days
3		Adel Fakeih	29 April 2015	4 November 2017	2 years, 189 days
4		Mohammad Al-Tuwaijri	4 November 2017	6 March 2020	2 years, 123 days
—		Mohammed Al-Jadaan (Acting)	6 March 2020	3 May 2021	1 year, 58 days
5		Faisal F. Alibrahim	3 May 2021	Incumbent	4 years, 312 days

== Functions ==
The major function of the ministry is to prepare the development plans of the country. It has various major agencies including the General Authority for Statistics and the national computer center.

== See also ==
- Ministries of Saudi Arabia
