= Council of Economic and Development Affairs (Saudi Arabia) =

One of two subcabinets of the Kingdom of Saudi Arabia

The Saudi Council of Economic and Development Affairs is one of two subcabinets of the Kingdom of Saudi Arabia. It was established by King Salman to replace the Supreme Economic Council, and is led by the King Salman’s son and Crown Prince Mohammad bin Salman, who holds additional roles such as Defense minister.

== History ==
The fall in oil prices in 2014, coupled with developing security threats led King Salman bin Abdulaziz Al Saud to reshuffle the existing cabinet structure and staff. On 29 January 2015, days after assuming the throne, King Salman bin Abdulaziz ordered major changes to government including a cabinet reshuffle, via royal decree. He replaced a dozen existing cabinets, or advisory bodies, with two new ones: the Council of Political and Security Affairs, and the Council of Economic and Development Affairs, in order to improve efficiency in the government’s decision-making apparatus.

Each year, a meeting is chaired by the crown prince to review and assess the Council’s actions and decisions. Following an inaugural session in February 2015, review sessions were held in February 2016 and 2017: the first included briefs made by the Project Management Office (within CEDA) and the second featured briefs by the Ministry of Energy, Industry and Mineral Resources as well as the Minister of Justice, on improving their respective entities’ outputs, to be in line with the kingdom’s Vision 2030.

== Structure and function ==
The Council of Economic and Development Affairs aims at establishing the overall governance, the mechanisms and measures necessary to achieve Saudi Vision 2030. The body addresses issues spanning all Saudi domestic affairs, from health, labor, education and Islamic affairs.

The council shall also make decisions on any matter under its jurisdiction that could prevent programs from achieving their goals. Several dedicated committees and management offices have been set up. The council breaks down the roles and responsibilities of the relevant government agencies and mechanisms, including a strategic committee and an office of strategic management.

== Membership ==
Council of Economic and Development Affairs
Prince Mohammad bin Salman Al Saud	Crown Prince and Prime Minister, President
Dr. Walid bin Mohammed bin Saleh Al-Samaani	Minister of justice, Member
Dr. Musaad bin Mohammed Al Aiban	Minister of State, Member of the Council of Ministers, Member
Eng. Khalid bin Abdulaziz Al-Falih	Minister of Petroleum and Mineral Resources, Member
Mohamed Bin Abdullah Al-Jadaan	Minister of Finance, Member
Ahmed bin Suleiman Al-Rajhi	Minister of Labor and Social Development, Member
Majed Al-Hogail	Minister of Housing, Member
Dr. Mohammad Saleh bin Taher Benten	Minister of Hajj and Umrah, Member
Mohammad Al-Tuwaijri	Minister of Economy and Planning, Member
Dr.Majid bin Abdullah Al Qasabi	Minister of Commerce and Investment, Member
Saleh bin Nasser Al-Jasser	Minister of Transport, Member
Abdullah bin Amer Al-Sawaha	Minister of Communications and Information Technology, Member
Mohammed bin Abdulmalik Al Al Sheikh	Minister of State, Member of the Council of Ministers, Member
Fahad Al-Jalajel	Minister of Health, Member
Sulaiman Alhamdan	Minister of Civil Service, Member
Eng. Abdulrahman bin Abdulmohsen Al-Fadhli	Minister of Environment, Water and Agriculture, Member
Dr. Hamad bin Mohammed Al Al-Sheikh	Minister of Education, Member
Turki Al-Shabanah	Minister of Media, Member
Badr bin Abdullah bin Mohammed Al Farhan	Minister of Culture, Member
Faisal bin Farhan Al Saud	Minister of Foreign Affairs, Member
Dr. Essam bin Saad bin Said	Minister of State, Member of the Council of Ministers, Member
Ghassan bin Abdulrahman Al-Shibl	Chairman of the board of directors of the Local Content and Government Procurement Commission, Member
Ahmad bin Aqeel Al-Khatib	Chairman of the Board of Directors of the Saudi Commission for Tourism and National Heritage, Member
Mohammed bin Sulaiman Al-Ajaji	Head of experts commission at the Council of Ministers, Member
