= Faisal F. Alibrahim =

Saudi government minister

His Excellency Faisal F. Alibrahim
- فيصل بن فاضل الإبراهيم
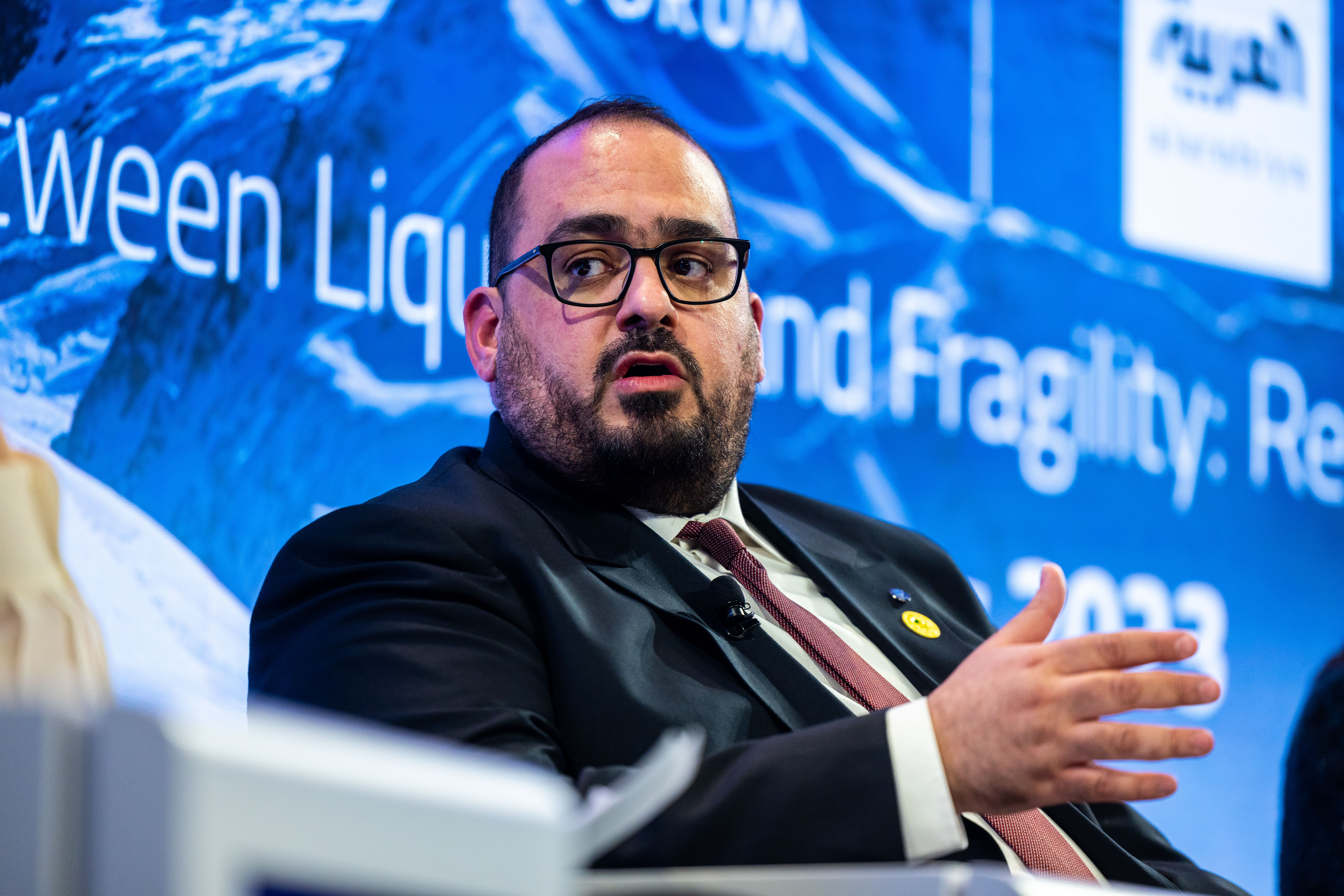
- Alibrahim in 2023

Minister of Economy and Planning
- Incumbent
- Assumed office 3 May 2021
- Monarch: Salman
- Prime Minister: Salman (2021–2022); Mohammad bin Salman (2022–present)
- Preceded by: Mohammed Al-Jadaan

Vice Minister of Economy and Planning
- In office 26 February 2018 – 2 May 2021

Personal details
- Born: Faisal bin Fadhil Alibrahim
- Children: 2
- Education: Pennsylvania State University; Massachusetts Institute of Technology (MBA)

Faisal bin Fadhil Alibrahim (Arabic: فيصل بن فاضل الإبراهيم) is the minister of Economy and Planning of Saudi Arabia. Alibrahim previously served as vice minister of Economy and Planning (6 February 2018 – 3 May 2021), supervisor of the Secretariat of the Council of Economic and Development Affairs, secretary of the board of directors of the National Development Fund, and chair of the Board of General Authority for Statistics. He is currently tasked with leading the diversification of Saudi Arabia's economy.

== Education ==
Alibrahim graduated from Pennsylvania State University with two bachelors of science, one each in economics and accounting.

He later completed his MBA at the Massachusetts Institute of Technology.

== Career ==
Prior to his appointment as minister, Alibrahim served as Vice Minister of Economy and Planning for three years (2018–2021). He began working in the ministry as an adviser in 2016.

Previously, he held several roles at Saudi Arabian Oil Company (Saudi Aramco), including vice president of Aramco Development (2013–2015), head of Mergers & Acquisitions at New Business Development (2012–2014), commercial director of the Ras Al-Khair Maritime Yard Project, and project director of the Vela-Bahri Transaction. He also worked as a project manager for the Merger of Operations and Fleet Deals for Villa and Bahri Company, in addition to serving as project manager for King Salman International Complex for Services and Maritime Industries in Ras Al-Khair for Commercial and Financial Affairs (2014–2015).

=== Minister of Economy and Planning ===
Alibrahim assumed his position as minister of Economy and Planning after a period of advising the ministry. Since being appointed as a minister in May 2021, he has overseen the continued digital transformation of Saudi Arabia's economy. In that time, the kingdom has risen 20 places in the Digital Competitiveness Report 2021 to rank second among G20 countries. In May 2022, the Ministry of Economy and Planning launched the 2022 Census of Saudi Arabia, which is the Kingdom's first digital census.

== Presidencies and memberships ==
- chairman of the board of General Authority for Statistics. (since 2021)
- Member of the advisory board for Young Leaders in Aramco (2011–2012)
- Member of the board of directors of the Cultural Development Fund (since 2021)
- Member of the board of directors of the Geophysical Equipment Factory Ltd (2014–2015)
- Member of the board of directors of the Local Content and Government Procurement Authority (since 2019)
- Member of the board of directors of the National Council for Measuring the Performance of Public Institutions "Adaa" (since 2020)
- Member of the board of directors of the National Energy Efficiency Services Company "Tarsheed" (since 2018)
- Member of the board of directors of the Non-Oil Revenue Development Center (since 2019)
- Member of the board of directors of the Nuclear and Radiological Regulatory Authority (since 2022)
- Secretary of the board of directors of the National Development Fund (since 2018)
- Strategy advisor at Uber (2015–2016)
- Supervisor of the Secretariat of the Council of Economic and Development Affairs

== Honors and awards ==
- Selected as Young Global Leader of the Year 2020 by the World Economic Forum.
