= Uqair =

Ancient fort in Saudi Arabia

Uqair العقير
- City
- العقير
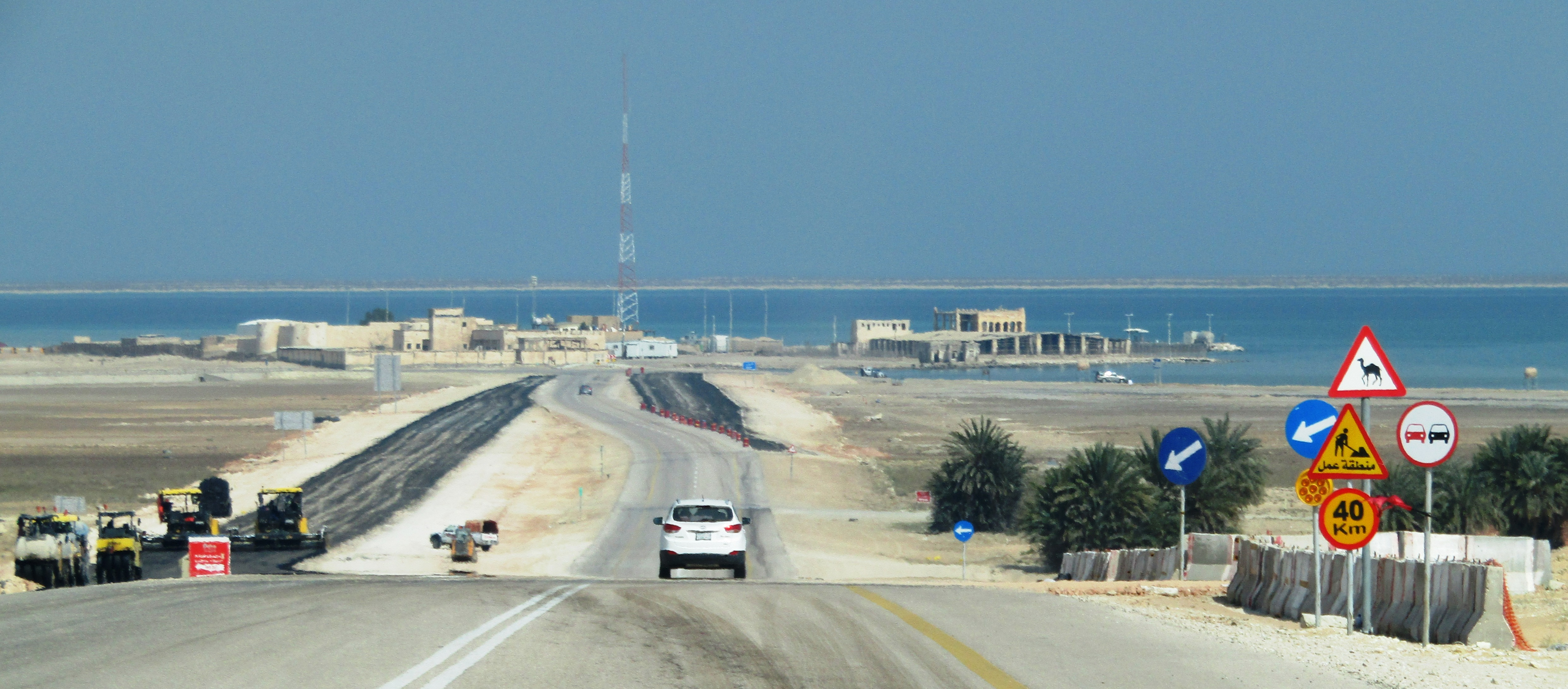
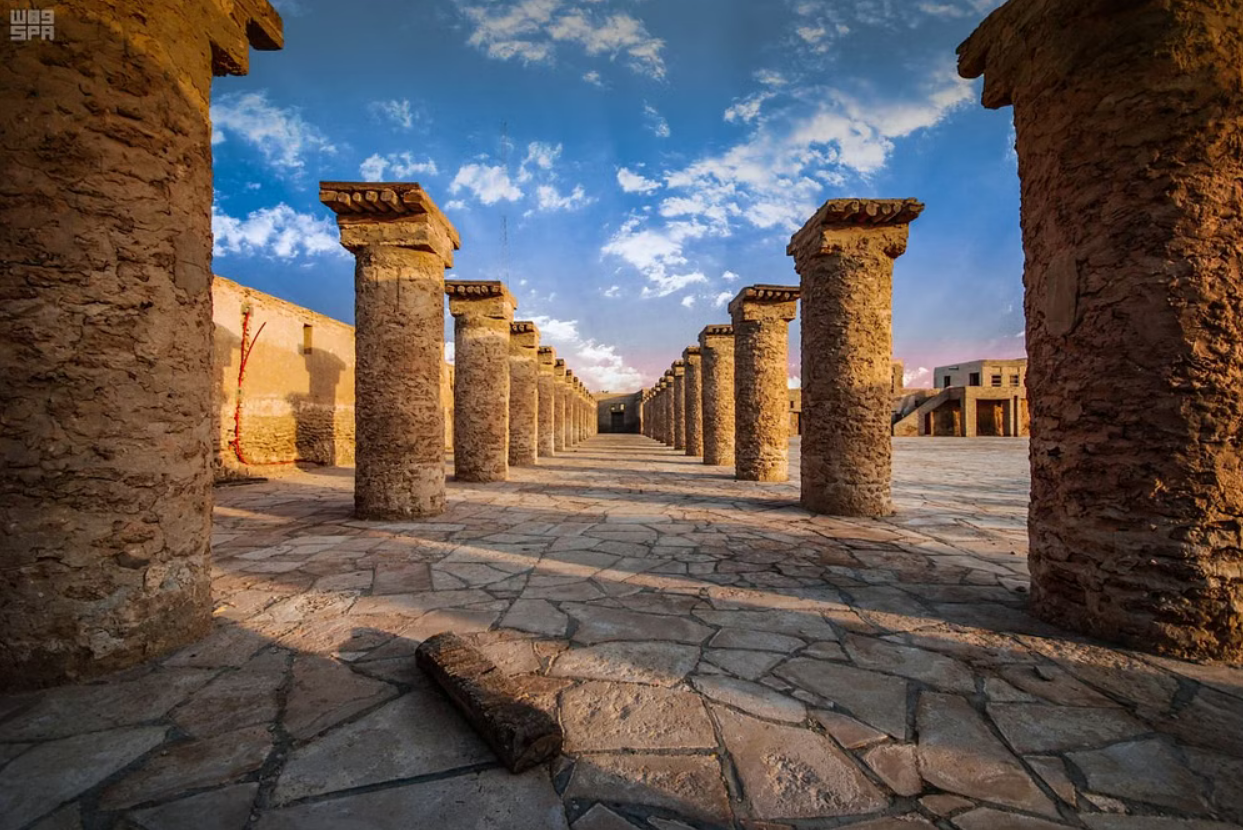
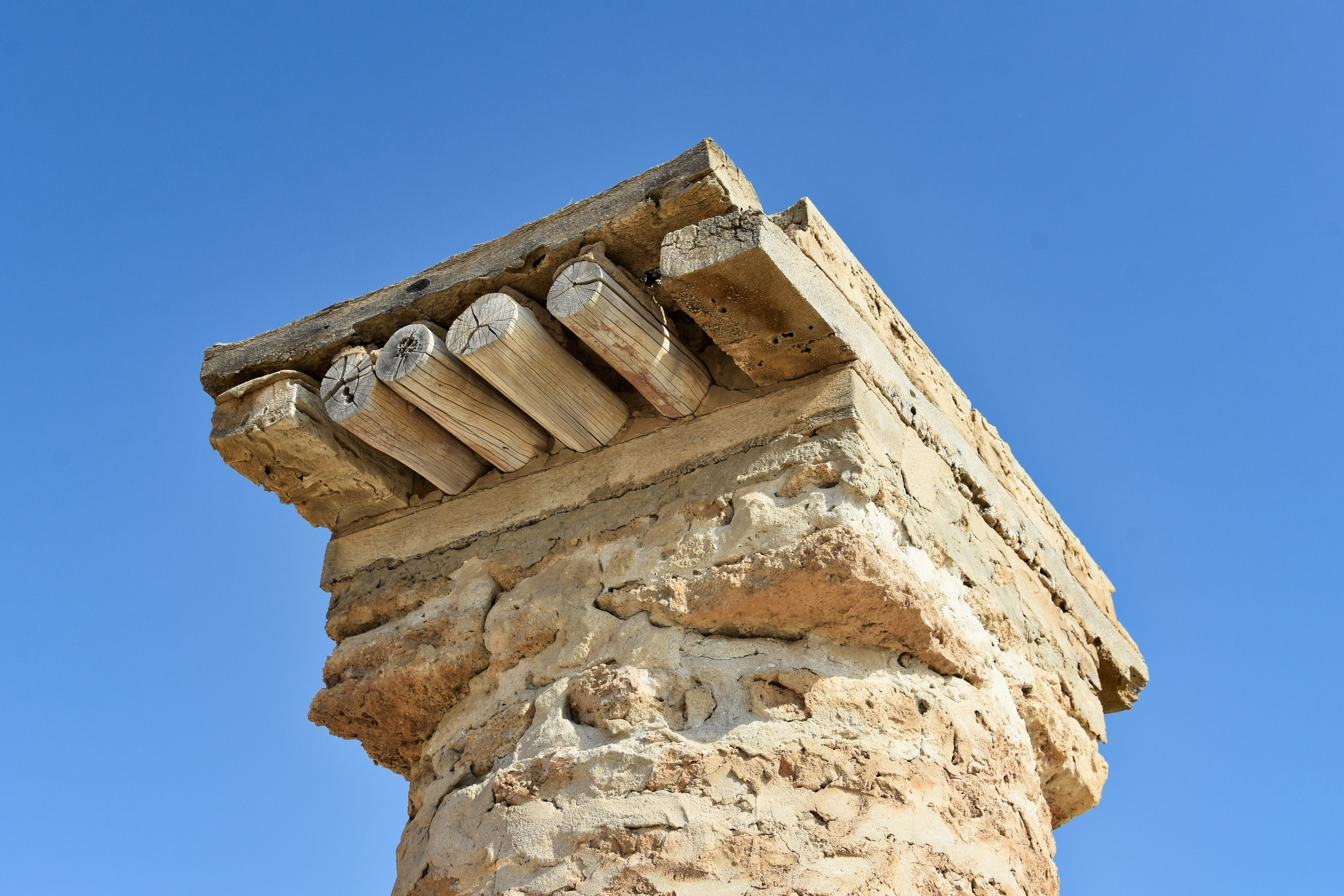
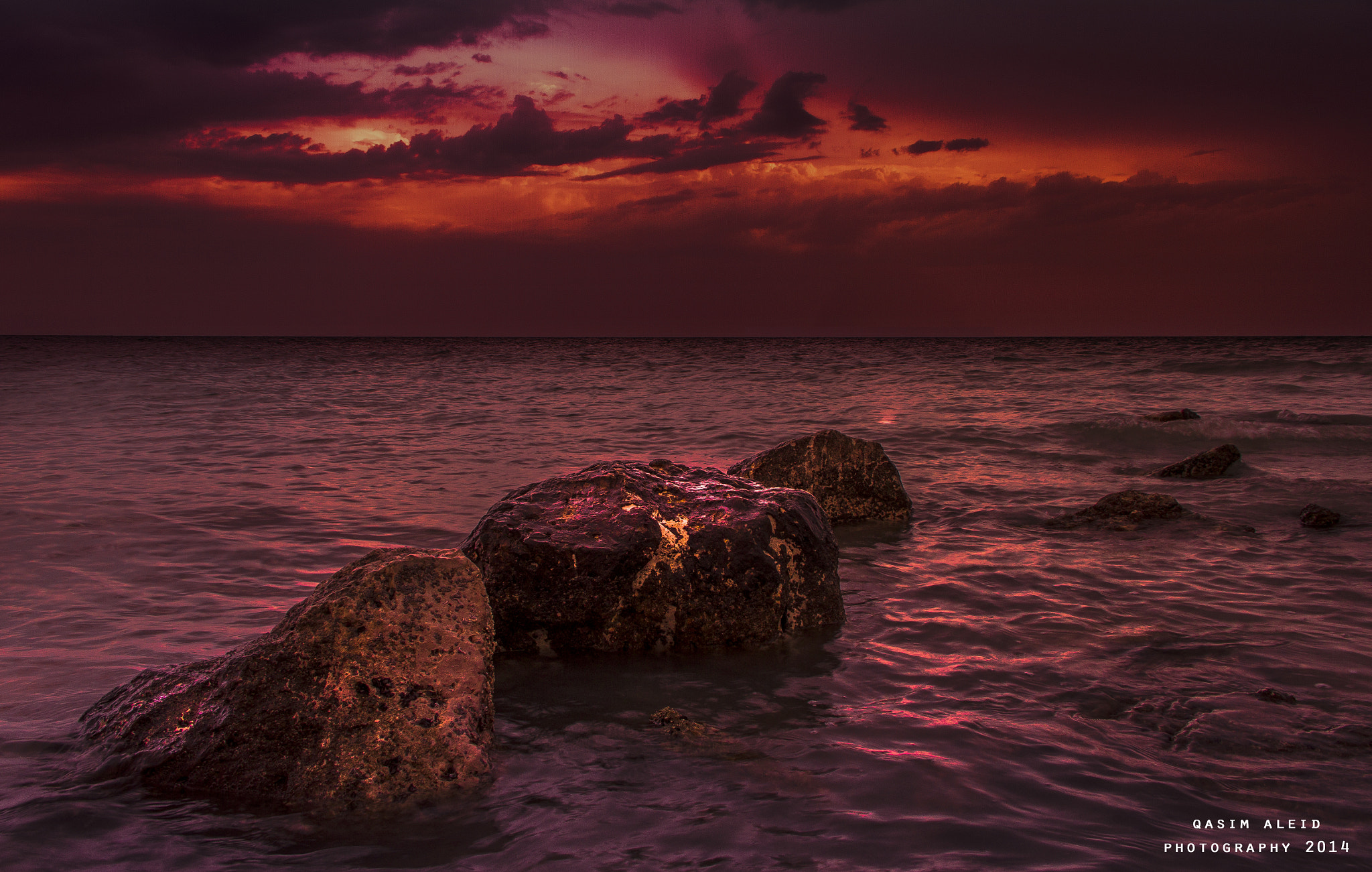
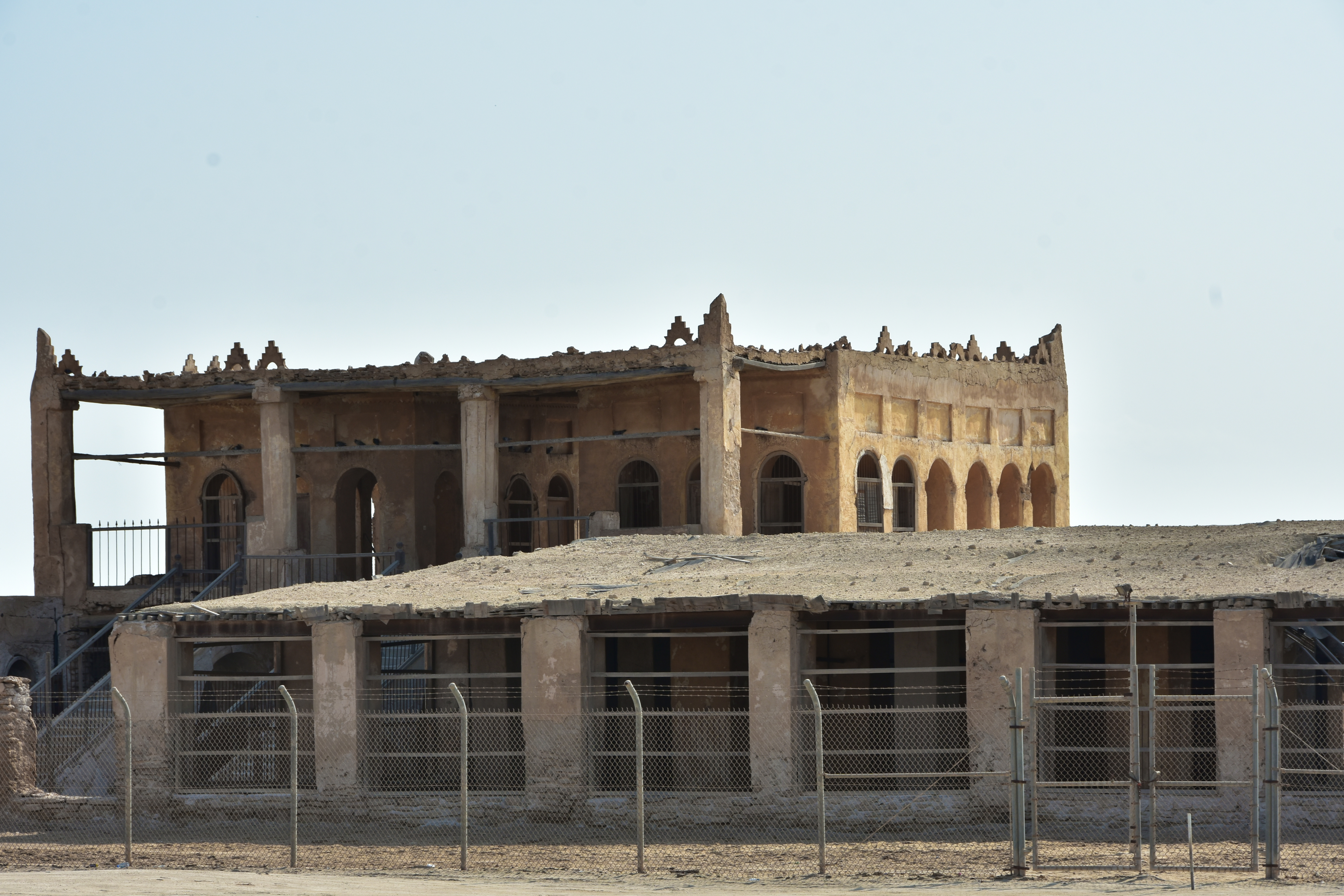

- Location within Saudi Arabia
- Coordinates: 25°38′39″N 50°12′54″E
- Country: Saudi Arabia
- Province: Eastern Province

Government
  - Type: Monarchy
  - Provincial Governor: Saud bin Nayef
- Time zone: UTC+3 (AST)
- Postal code: 36217

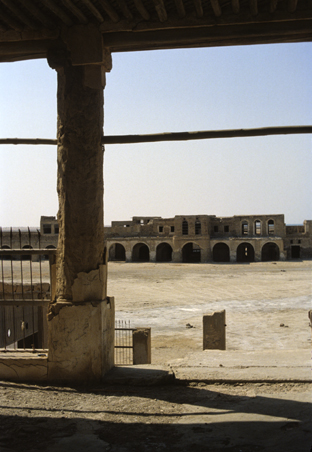
Uqair

Uqair (Arabic: العقير), also transliterated as al-'Uqair, Uqayr, and Ogair, is an ancient seaport located in the Al-Ahsa Governorate of the Eastern Province of Saudi Arabia. Situated on the Persian Gulf coast, it is considered one of the earliest seaports in the region and has been linked to the ancient city of Gerrha mentioned in classical Greek and Roman sources. Uqair is also notable as the site of the 1922 Uqair Protocol, a significant event in the establishment of modern Saudi Arabia's borders. Today, Uqair is recognized for its archaeological remains, historical importance, and natural features. Its strategic location opposite the Al-Ahsa Oasis made it a vital link for sea trade with Bahrain and a key entry point for caravans to inland regions until the 1930s.

== Etymology ==
The name "Uqair" is attributed to the Ajaru (Arabic: أجاروا) or Ajeeru (Arabic: عجيروا) tribe that inhabited the region in the first millennium BC. It is believed that the name was altered to "Uqair" due to a common practice in the Gulf dialect of substituting certain letters, such as replacing the "qaf" (ق) with the "jeem" (ج), resulting in "Ajeer" instead of "Uqair."

== History ==
Uqair's importance stemmed from its strategic location on a protected bay opposite the al-Hasa Oasis. Al Uqayr was a vital link for sea trade with Bahrain, the Gulf's shipping and political hub. Until the 1930s, when road connections to Dammam, Qatif, and al-Hasa were established, most imports for Hofuf and inland regions passed through Al Uqayr via caravans.

=== Ancient and Classical Periods ===
Uqair has been associated with the ancient city of Gerrha, a wealthy merchant city described by classical authors such as Strabo and Pliny the Elder. Gerrha was a key player in the incense trade, connecting Arabia with Mesopotamia, India, and beyond. While the exact location of Gerrha remains debated, Uqair has been proposed as a potential candidate due to its proximity to the Al-Ahsa Oasis and its position along ancient trade routes. However, archaeological findings from a 1968 Danish expedition indicate that the Uqair ruins date to a later, Islamic period.

Archaeological evidence suggests that Uqair was part of a broader network of settlements in the region, including Dilmun and Thaj . The area's access to fresh water from the Al-Ahsa Oasis and its coastal location made it an ideal site for a trading port.

==== Link to Gerrha ====
Ancient Gerrha has been associated with several locations. The notorious shifting sands of the desert have made it difficult to locate the trading emporium, well described in general history and archeological texts. Even though Uqair is the present location of what is believed to be an Islamic fort, the whole region twenty miles north of the current structure was also referred to as Uqair, or Gerrha, long before the fort was built. The lost city of Gerrha according to Danish archeologist Geoffrey Bibby, however, "still awaits its discoverer."

In accounts written by his biographer Arrian, Alexander the Great mentions a planned coastal exploration of 323 BC that includes the eastern Arabian coast but does not mention Gerrha. A hundred years later, however, Eratosthenes tells of merchants from Gerrha carrying their spices and incense overland to Mesopotamia. And later Strabo quotes Artimedoros: "by the incense trade ... the Gerrhaei have become the richest of all the tribes and possess great quantity of wrought articles in gold and silver." Gerrha is described by Pliny the Elder: "On the Arabian shore of the Gulf one comes to the island Ichara and then the Gulf of Capeus where we find the city of Gerrha, five miles in circumference, with towers built of square blocks of salt. Fifty miles from the east lying in the interior is the region of Attene and opposite to Gerrha is the island of Tylos."

In 200 BC a Greek grammarian named Agatharchides, who wrote a book on the Erythraean (modern Red) Sea now lost, is quoted by the Roman geographer/historian Strabo on Gerrha: "from their trafficking, the Gerrhaeans have become the richest of all; and they have a vast equipment of both gold and silver articles, such as couches and tripods and bowls, together with drinking vessels and very costly houses; for doors and wall and ceilings are variegated with ivory and gold and silver set with precious stones." The city of Gerrha played a central role in the interchange of commodities of certain regions of the Arabian Peninsula during the reign of the Seleucid King Antiochus III, (223–187 BC). Most notable was the frankincense and myrrh of southwestern Arabia in Yemen's Hadramawt region.

The Gerrhaeans also traded with East Africa and China through India. In their activity "they act as the warehouse for everything from Asia and Europe ... seem more prosperous than the Sabaeans." Trade through Gerrha was heavy in the time of Antioch; Strabo writes: "the leading people of this time were the Gerrhaeans, and the Arab tribe whose capital lay on the mainland just opposite Bahrain made ... enormous incomes by trading the precious wares of Arabia and India to the mouths of the Euphrates and Tigris, along the upper course of the rivers by ancient caravan routes to the coast of Syria and Phoenicia even as far as Delos and the Aegean Sea."

The lure of wealth generated in Gerrha by its inhabitants was too tempting for Antiochus to avoid. In 205 BC, he felt it necessary to make a large-scale military incursion against the Gerrhaeans with the object of securing himself a reasonable portion of their trade. Antiochus was diverted from his goal of capturing the city, however, when the "Gerrhaeans bought off his attack with 500 talents of silver, 1000 talents of frankincense, and 200 talents of 'stacte' myrrh."

==== Ties to Mesopotamia ====
Trade and commerce of early civilizations in the Persian Gulf region was both the umbilical cord to surrounding cultures and the eventual physical link that has allowed scientists and researchers to literally piece together its murky history. The greatest regional center of civilization lay only 300 miles north of Uqair at the confluence of the Tigris and Euphrates Rivers. Mesopotamia, a very fertile region north of this confluence in modern Iraq, and where Sumerian civilization began. By 3500 BC the Sumerians were living and trading beyond the Strait of Hormuz, venturing out as far as the Indus River and the Red Sea. The Sumerians were conquered by the Semitic Akkadians in 2340, becoming united under Babylon from 1792 - 1750 BC.

==== Dilmun ====
Gerrha was preceded by the legendary Sumerian-era civilization of Dilmun (4000 - 2000 BC), which has been archeologically linked to the northern tip of Bahrain. During its zenith, the culture controlled the oceanic trading routes to the Indies and was the trading link to the Indus Valley and Mesopotamia. To the Sumerians, Dilmun was the land of immortality and the god of Abzu. The second sea of fresh water that lay beneath the gulf and was believed to flow from the Tigris and Euphrates under the ground to present Bahrain - in the land called Enki. "Dilmun founded a maritime network unrivaled for its breadth by any other in the early days of man's world ... it was home of the Utunapishtim, who survived the flood, it was soapstone for figurines, alabaster for bowls, carnelian heads beads, cowries and pearls ... it was copper and lapis lazuli.". Dilmun is the "Paradise Land, the original home of the gods, the archetypical Holy Land" to which the Mesopotamian hero Gilgamesh travels to in his epic journey.

===== Danish expedition =====
Geoffrey Bibby, an English archeologist who excavated on the island of Bahrain from 1954 to 1969 and claimed it to be Dilmun, included Uqair, across the straits, in his investigations, visiting it on three separate journeys, in 1963 by air only, and in 1965 and in 1968 by land. Bibby wrote:

Tylos we knew was Bahrain...Attene, was fifty miles inland, was normally believed to be the Hofuf oasis. On the coast, in the direct line between Hofuf and Bahrain, lay the village of Uqair, and beside it the ruins of a large walled town. It had seemed obvious to many modern theorists that Uqair must be Gerrha and the identification seemed clinched by the fact that in the local dialect of the Arabic, the letter 'q' was pronounced as a 'g.' Uqair is pronounced Ogair, which is close enough to the Greek name to be convincing.

In Bibby's quest for the city of Dilmun he managed three sondages (digs) at the city of Uqair. Of his investigation, he detailed his search for pre-Islamic clues: "the ruined city of Uqair stretches more vastly on the ground than it appeared from the air. I followed ... the northern wall across the subkha [Arabic term for dried salt flats] toward the shore, the ruined tower - certainly a modern addition - marked the southwestern corner ... ahead of me the wall ended at a coastal tower, but like the wall, only a course or so high ... and beyond the strait lay the mud brick houses and yellow fort of the present villages."

Bibby details the construction of the wall and deduces that "the wall was built of a coral like conglomerate called farush," which to Bibby "felt wrong because of the fluctuating level of sea water." He stated; "If anywhere there was a subkha today there should have been water even as recently as 2000 years ago. If that were true then this wall (at Uqair) could not be as old as the wall at Thaj." (The walls of Thaj, another ruined city near Qatif, were built during the same period as Gerrha - the Greek period.) But as Bibby concludes ... "in the cities of the Greek period on Bahrain and the temple of towns of the Seleucid on Failaka (an island off the coast of Kuwait once thought to be a Hellenistic foundry of coins) farush was never used. The walls there were made of quarried limestone."

Northwest of Uqair, referred to as the salt mine site, or Gerrha, are the extensive remains of irrigation works and fields visible on aerial photographs of the area, some of which may be dated to the Hellenistic period. (Potts, p. 56-57). Bibby went to these irrigation channels to dig and search for artifacts in 1968. He excavated what he labeled the "subkha fort and produced several shards comparable to types known from Thaj and Hellenistic Bahrain. Identical results were obtained in a sounding carried out in a different structure. This was the so called inland fort. It measured 150 ft. (49 m) by 156 ft. (52 m) and was constructed by large stone ashlars. The contention has sometimes been made that this was the site of ancient Gerrha, but there is no evidence to support this. (Potts, p. 56-57). The site of the fort is not the same as the irrigation channels.

==== Other important surrounding locations of antiquity ====
The location of pre-Islamic Al-Hasa is of great importance and relevance to Uqair. Artesian wells once fed "a series of interconnected streams and lakes draining north eastward toward the Persian Gulf above Uqair. Reports of the existence of this active ravine system can be traced back to the time of Pliny." Evidence of this effluent has a great bearing on the exploration of the fort at Uqair and the ancient Arabian city of Gerrha. A large source of fresh water near the Persian Gulf is reason enough to create a trading port located at Uqair and to facilitate the civilization that flourished at Al-Hasa. It is well documented that the Al-Hasa region and most notably Uqair were once considered to be strong candidates for the possible lost city of Gerrha, an emporium of trade and mercantile activity dating to at least 225 BC.

Other ancient civilizations flourished in the surrounding area. Across the shallow Gulf strait sixty miles to the northeast are the ancient burial mounds of what is now known to be the lost ancient civilization of Dilmun. These burial mounds estimated at more than 100,000, rest on the island of Bahrain. On the Arabian Peninsula, the walled city of Thaj is 80 miles north of Uqair and just 20 miles inland from another ancient Arabian oasis, Qatif. Both of these sites have been dated to at least the Hellenistic period. The Saudi island of Tarut, another rich archeological area, lies 40 miles to the east of the old port and fishing village of Jubail, which once served Thaj and Qatif, and is located about 35 miles north of Uqair.

=== Islamic Era ===
During the Islamic period, Uqair continued to serve as an important harbor for the Al-Ahsa region. The 10th-century geographer al-Hamdani described Uqair as one of the most important towns in Eastern Arabia. It served as the harbor for al-Hasa, and was noted for its palm groves. Vestiges of these medieval gardens may still be seen in the scrub palms on the low ground near the fortified well of Abu Zahmul.

=== 16th & 17th century ===
==== Possible Portuguese Influence ====
It is not impossible the fort at Uqair could be the result of the Portuguese domination of the Persian Gulf, which began in 1506 with the expedition of Afonso de Albuquerque. His mission was to destroy Arab trade and establish Portuguese dominance. Their oppressive influence may have completely transformed the regional power structure but they left no religious and hardly any cultural imprint, except for their cannons and ruined garrisons. Before the Portuguese, "wealthy city states were developed around favorably situated harbors ... inhabited mostly by Arab tribes ... to dominate the entrepot trade between India, Arab countries and Europe, which passed through Mesopotamia and the Red Sea." The construction of Portuguese forts was common. A large structure still stands on the island of Bahrain (1521 AD) in recognition of its importance as a favorable position to assert their power and control of the Persian Gulf by way of the Straits of Hormuz. The Portuguese stayed in the gulf just until the 18th century after several revolts of Arab natives attempted to regain their harbors and trade. The confusion and growing interest of the Turks (who also built forts in the region) and Persians created a situation for the Portuguese which they could not control.

In 1799, an important event took place at Aluqair Port in Saudi Arabia, known as the Battle of Aluqair. This battle was part of a larger series of conflicts involving the First Saudi state and its efforts to defend its territories from external threats.

The Saudi forces, led by Imam Abdulaziz ibn Muhammad Al Saud, defended Aluqair Port against an invading Ottoman Egyptian army under the command of Ibrahim Pasha, the son of the Ottoman viceroy of Egypt, Muhammad Ali Pasha. The Ottomans sought to regain control over the region and suppress the growing influence of the Saudi-led forces, who were establishing a theocratic state based on their interpretation of Islam, known as the Wahhabi movement.

The battle was significant because the Saudi forces managed to defend the port, and it marked one of the many confrontations between the Saudi state and the Ottomans during that period.

=== 20th Century ===
==== The Uqair Protocol (1922) ====
In the late 19th and early 20th centuries, Al Uqayr became a natural port of entry for visitors to Hofuf. It was a key location for political meetings, particularly during the reign of King Abdulaziz. In 1920, British High Commissioner for Iraq Sir Percy Cox met King Abdulaziz at Al Uqayr, and in late 1922, they negotiated and signed the Uqair Protocol of 1922. This meeting established the Kingdom's boundaries with Iraq and Kuwait and created the Neutral Zones, which allowed tribes from both sides to access traditional wells and grazing grounds. The event was attended by notable figures, including Lebanese-American writer Ameen Rihani and Major Frank Holmes.

==== 1920-1930s ====
During the 1920s and 1930s, Al Uqayr experienced a surge in shipping activity, particularly when inland trade with Kuwait was suspended. However, the advent of automobiles and the challenges posed by Al Uqayr's shallow offshore waters and sandy terrain led to its decline as a major port. By the mid-20th century, it had become a quiet coastal village, largely unchanged since the pre-Aramco era.

==== 1950-1970s ====
Uqair's importance as a port declined starting in 1957 with the commencement of operations at the King Abdul Aziz Port (in Dammam) and the construction of the railway line. The development of easier land routes closer to the newly discovered oil fields further facilitated the transport of resources and personnel, further impacting Uqair's role.

By the 1970s, Al Uqayr had become a quiet fishing village, with its old customs compound and sheds lying deserted. The paved route to Qatar, completed in the 1970s, bypassed the village. A paved road to the harbor was planned, along with a combined seawater desalination and power plant capable of producing 25 million gallons per day.

=== 20th Century ===
- 1997: The buildings of Al-Uqair Port, including the khan, emirate and emirate fort, were re renovated in 1997.
- 2003: Al-Uqair designated as a Tourism Development Area of high strategic priority.
- 2004: Establishment of Al-Uqair Steering Committee.
- 2010: Area designated as 'Tourism Investment Area'.
- 2013: Establishment of Uqair Development Company

== Geography ==
Uqair is located approximately 70 kilometers (43 miles) northeast of the Al-Ahsa Oasis and 70 kilometers (43 miles) south of Dhahran. The site lies on the coast of the Persian Gulf, along a direct line between the Al-Ahsa Oasis and Bahrain. The area is characterized by a shallow lagoon and a harbor, next to which the ruins of Abu Zahmul, a large fort stand.

=== Natural Features ===
Uqair is home to several unique natural features:

- Abu Zahmul Well: A fortified well with a tower.
- Salvadora Persica Grove: A thick grove of "toothbrush trees," traditionally used for oral hygiene, known locally as "rak" or "toothbrush trees," grows. The roots and twigs of this shrub are traditionally used for teeth cleaning and are sold in markets in Khobar and Dammam.
- Musical Beach: A beach where fine white sand emits squeaking sounds when walked upon, first noted by British naturalist R. E. Chessman in the 1920s.

== Landmarks ==
=== Uqair Fort ===
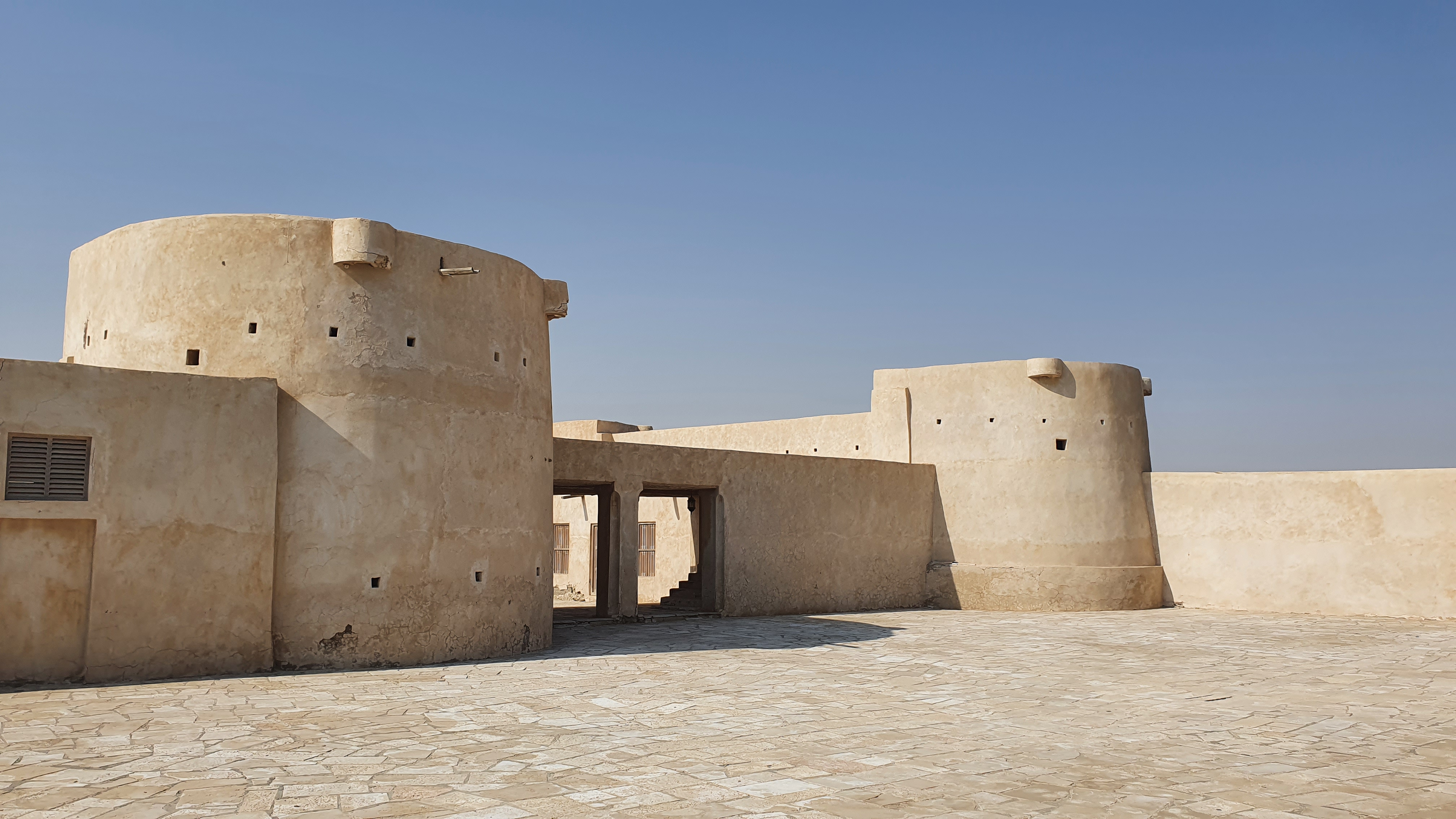
Uqair Fort, 2020.

Uqair Fort, also known as Al-Hisn, served as the primary structure in the port and the seat of local governance. The rectangular-shaped fort measures approximately 25 by 19 meters. Adjacent to the fort are a mosque and a caravanserai to the east. The fort features a long arcade with large arches extending from west to east, resembling a canopy. Its main entrance is a wide arched gateway flanked by two elevated chambers, each containing six arched windows. Archaeological surveys suggest that the fort was not military in nature, as it lacks significant fortifications or large structures. The fort was associated with the local ruler and military garrison, serving as their headquarters. During his visit, the American missionary Samuel Zwemer noted that the local ruler, Abdulwadood, resided there with approximately sixty officials, soldiers, and customs officers. Ottoman documents indicate that Uqair Port maintained a permanent military force, including regular infantry, gendarmerie, and cavalry units. British records specify that these forces consisted of 50 cavalry and 20 other soldiers.

=== Uqair Mosque ===
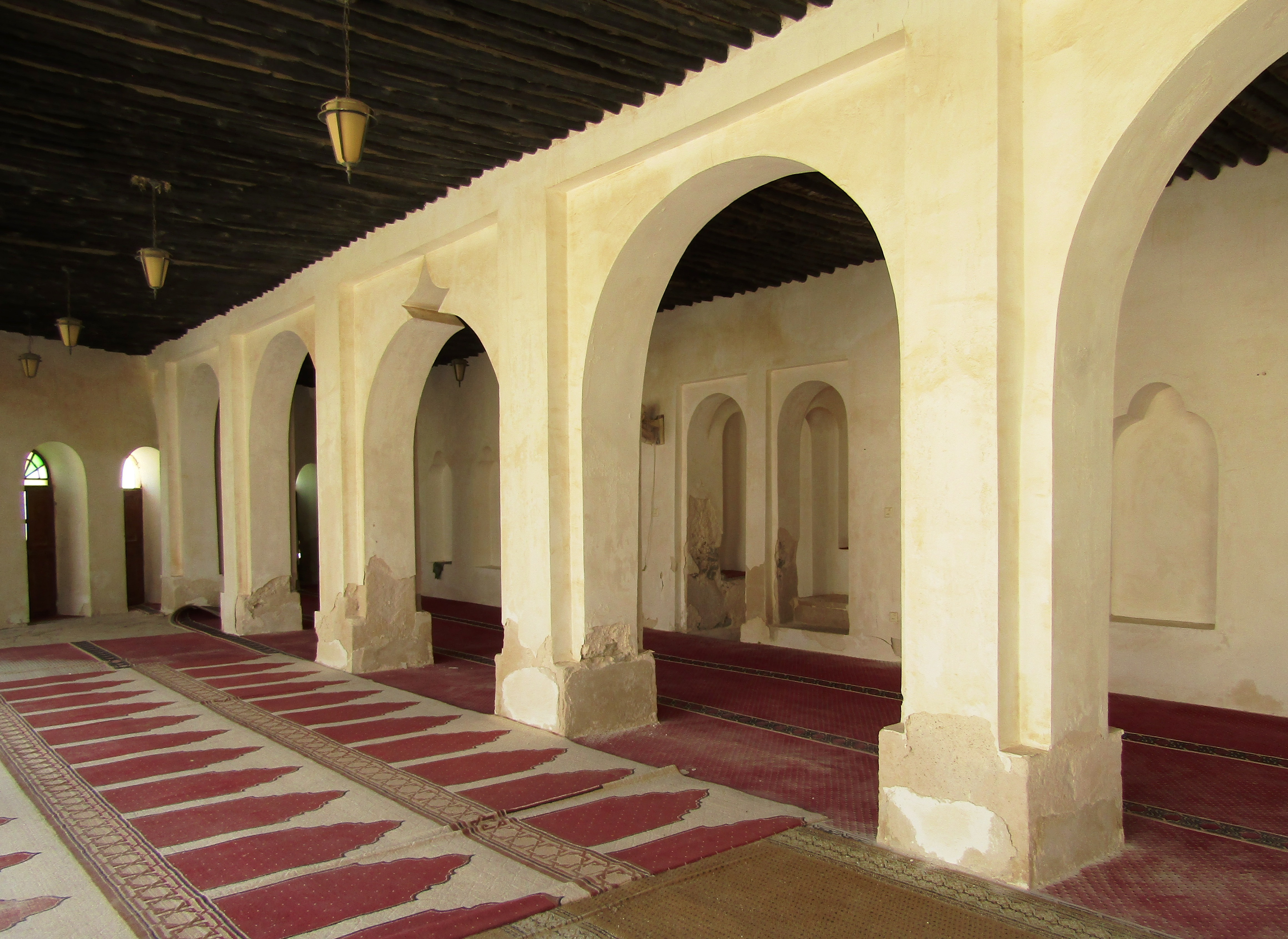
Inside Uqair Mosque, 2020.

The Uqair Mosque is one of the oldest standing structures in Uqair, reflecting the central role of mosques in Islamic urban architecture. While the exact date of its establishment is unknown, archaeological surveys suggest it dates back to the 16th century. It was later renovated during the Ottoman rule of Al-Ahsa, with British reports noting Ottoman efforts to build a large mosque in Uqair in 1890. The mosque was constructed by Sheikh Mohammed Abdulwahab and later expanded and renovated by Sheikh Hassan Al-Qusaibi under the orders of King Abdulaziz Al Saud. The mosque features Gulf-style architecture, with spacious courtyards, arches, and numerous windows and openings. Built from stone with a roof made of palm wood, the mosque covers an area of 353 square meters and can accommodate around 300 worshippers. It includes a prayer hall measuring 21 by 7 meters, containing a mihrab and minbar, and a triangular courtyard surrounded by a wall, covering approximately 150 square meters. The main entrance is located on the southern side, and the mosque lacks a minaret, indicating the absence of a significant residential population in the port area.

=== Uqair Caravanserai (Khan) ===
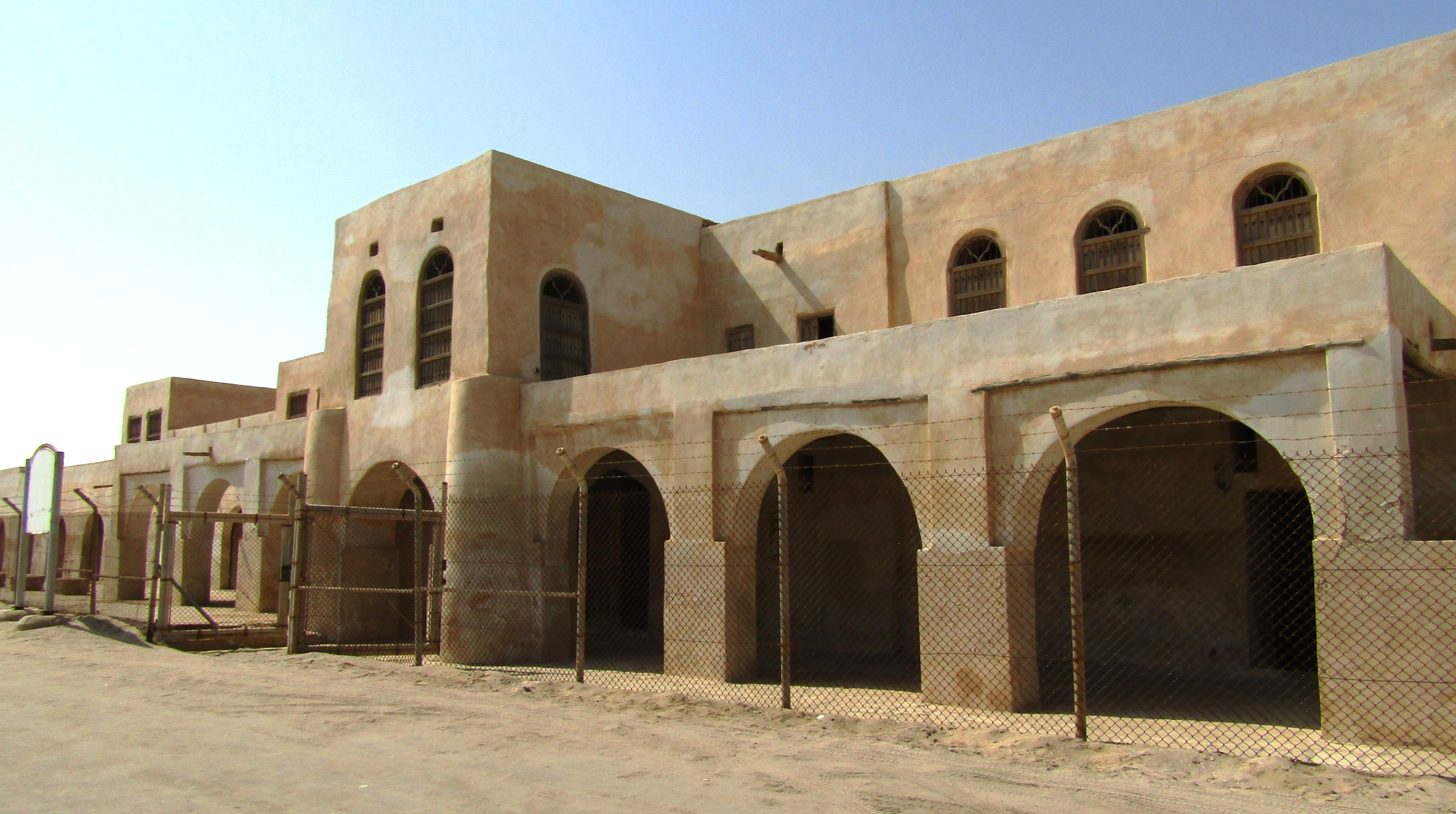
Uqair Ottoman Khan

Located east of the mosque, the Uqair Caravanserai built by the Ottomans used to be a large storage facility with a central main entrance. It served as a resting place for travelers and their animals, with caravans often stopping here. The caravanserai includes sleeping quarters, halls for merchants to display goods, and spaces for animals. It is flanked by approximately 30 small storage rooms where goods were kept until transportation. The structure measures about 150 yards in length and 80 yards in width, with walls on three sides and a roofed interior. It features entrances on the front side facing the desert and the rear side facing the Gulf. Most travelers stayed in the caravanserai, which contained 3 adjacent residential units. Nearby, a courtyard is adorned with short cylindrical columns, reflecting local and Islamic architectural influences, evoking the bustling market atmosphere of the past.

=== Historical Customs Building ===
The Customs Building is situated to the south, where officials used to manage customs procedures, shipping, unloading, and fee collection. The building reflects traditional local architecture. Adjacent to it on the eastern side are several offices, with two large chambers overlooking the sea and the port area. These chambers are accessible via two stone staircases leading to a spacious balcony. Samuel Zwemer noted that the Customs Building was the most significant structure in Uqair Port. It is rectangular, measuring approximately 100 by 200 yards, and is overseen by the port's director, whose office is located at the entrance on the southwestern wall. The building contains four rooms on the lower floor and two on the upper floor.

=== Rakka Fort (Abu Zahmul Tower) ===
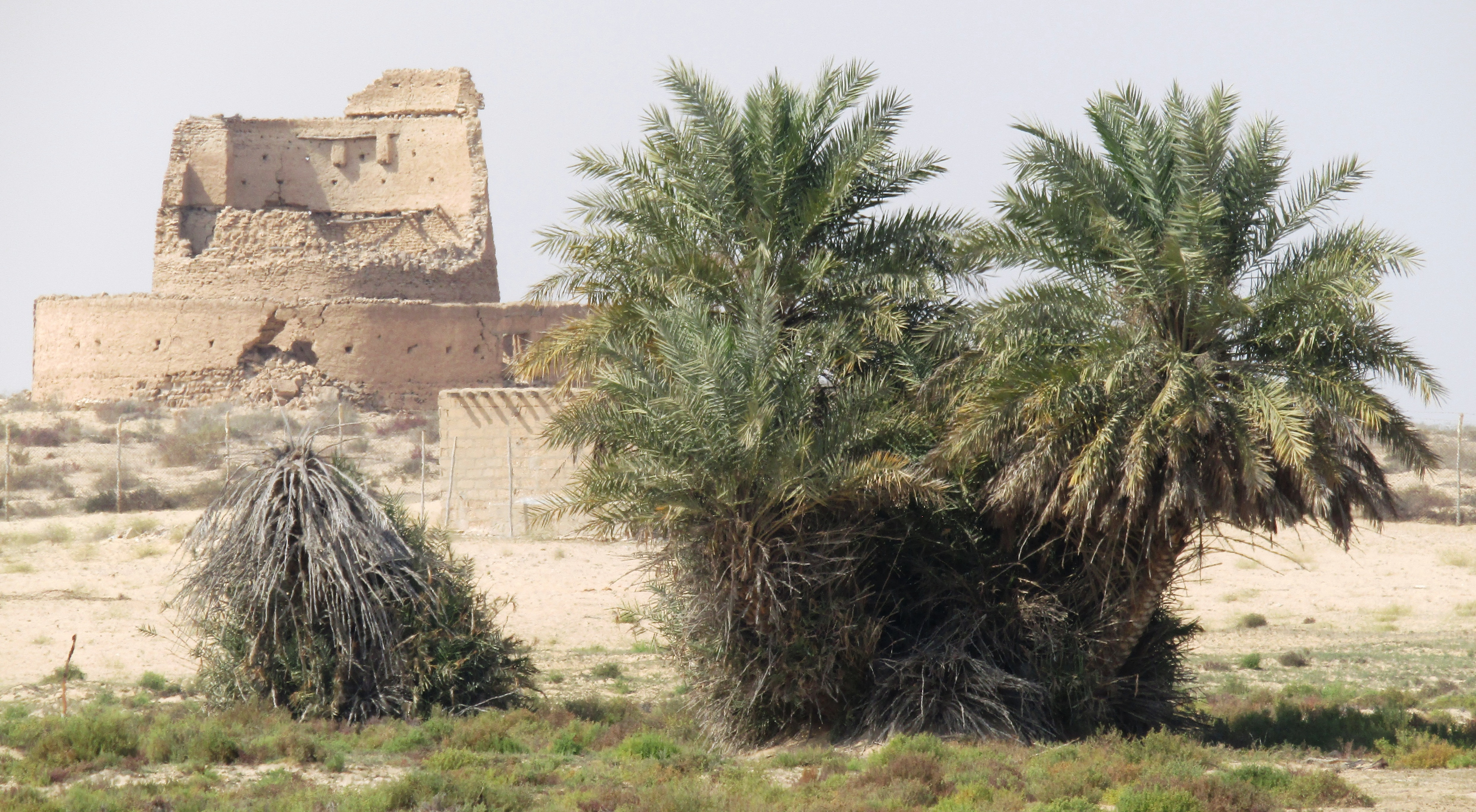
Abu Zahmul Tower

Rakka Fort, also known as Abu Zahmul Tower, was a well that provided water to the inhabitants of Uqair. Located approximately 600 yards northwest of the Customs Building, the tower is a cylindrical structure protecting a freshwater well that supplied water to Uqair. Built on an elevated hill overlooking Uqair Fort, about three kilometers to the northwest, the tower stands on a high plateau visible from the main road leading to the port. Architecturally, it is a significant defensive tower and historically linked to the Third Saudi State. The tower, often referred to as "Rakka Tower," is situated on a hill where high-quality arak trees grow. It was likely constructed during the Ottoman era, possibly before their arrival in the 16th century, to protect caravans from attacks and serve as a water supply station. The cylindrical tower is surrounded by a three-meter-high wall, with a partially collapsed section. It stands about ten meters tall, with three levels and an internal spiral staircase. Nearby is the Abu Zahmul Well, approximately four meters deep, known for its fresh water. To the northeast of the tower, remnants of an ancient buried city are visible along the sandy hill.

=== Uqair Beach ===
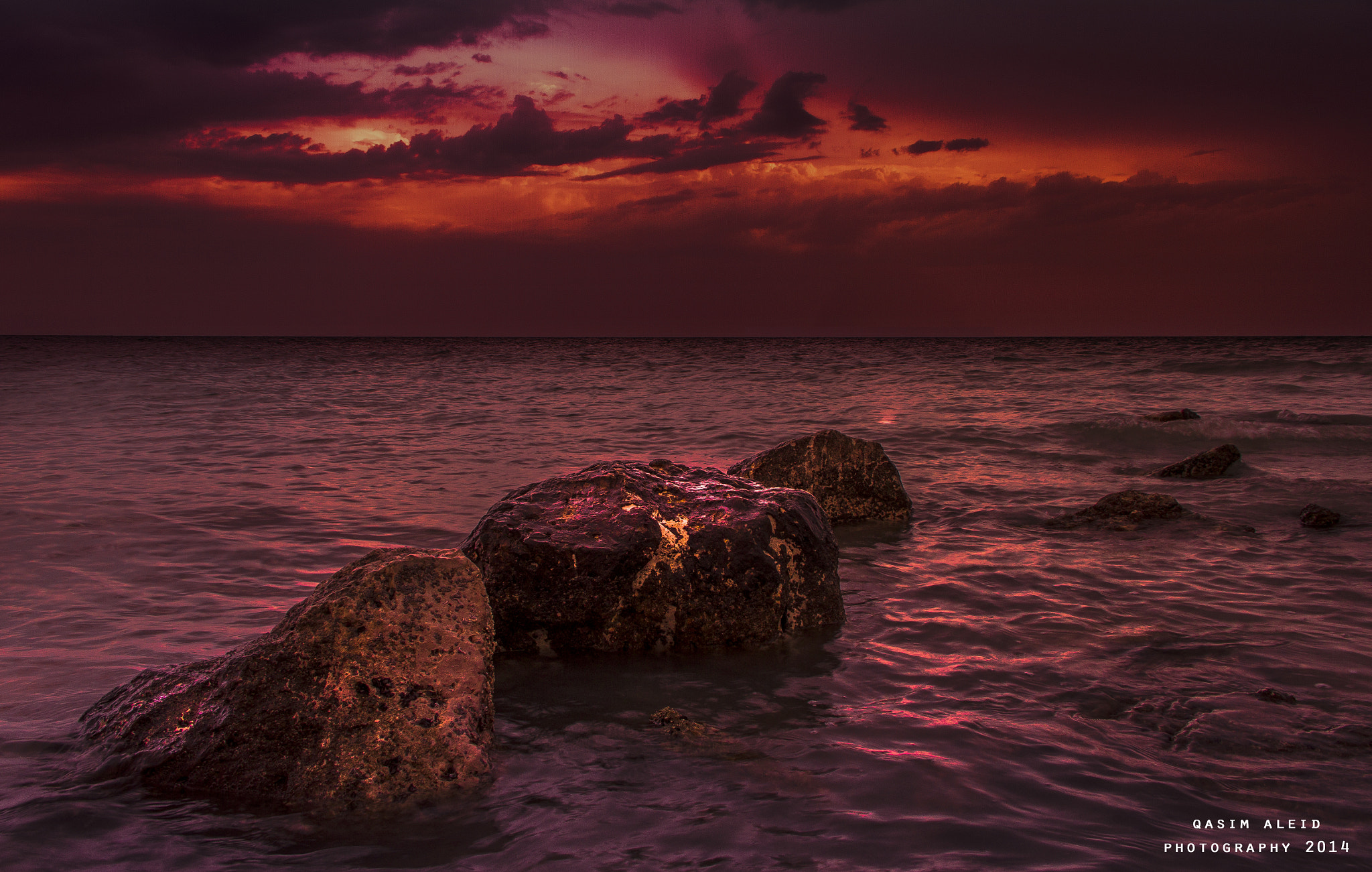
Uqair beach, 2013

Uqair Beach offers opportunities for various marine activities, including water skiing, surfing, sailing, and fishing. The beach is also occasionally used for dune racing. Camel and horse riding are additional activities available to visitors.

== Transport ==
=== Historical Transport ===
Uqair's location on the Persian Gulf made it a key node in ancient trade networks. Goods from the Al-Ahsa Oasis and other inland regions were transported to Uqair via caravans and then shipped to destinations across the Gulf. The village also served as a port for travelers and pilgrims.

=== Modern Transport ===
Today, Uqair is accessible by road, with connections to major cities such as Dhahran, Hofuf, and Dammam. The development of modern highways and the decline of maritime trade have reduced Uqair's role as a transport hub. However, its proximity to major urban centers ensures that it remains connected to regional transportation networks.

Major highways:

- 612 (Uqair Highway)
- Salwa Coastal Highway opened in late 2023.

== Economy ==
Historically, Uqair's economy was driven by its role as a trading port, facilitating the exchange of goods between the Arabian Peninsula, Mesopotamia, and beyond. The Al-Ahsa Oasis provided a reliable source of fresh water and agricultural products, which were traded through Uqair.

In the modern era, Uqair's economy has shifted away from maritime trade. The village now relies on fishing and small-scale agriculture, with some tourism centered around its historical and natural attractions.

=== Uqair Development Company ===
A major development project focused on Uqair was initiated in 2013 following directives from King Abdullah bin Abdulaziz, the Uqair Development Company was established with a capital of 2.71 billion Saudi Riyals (approximately 720 million US dollars). The project encompasses 100 million square meters, featuring 15 kilometers of coastline along the Gulf. The project received approval from the Supreme Economic Council in 2007 based on a proposal from the Saudi Commission for Tourism and Antiquities. Further endorsement came from the Council of Ministers in 2012, which allocated 1.4 billion Saudi Riyals for infrastructure development, including water, electricity, and sanitation.

== See also ==
- Thaj
- Tarout Island
- Al-Ahsa Oasis
