= Bandar Al Hajjar =

Saudi Arabian politician (born 1953)

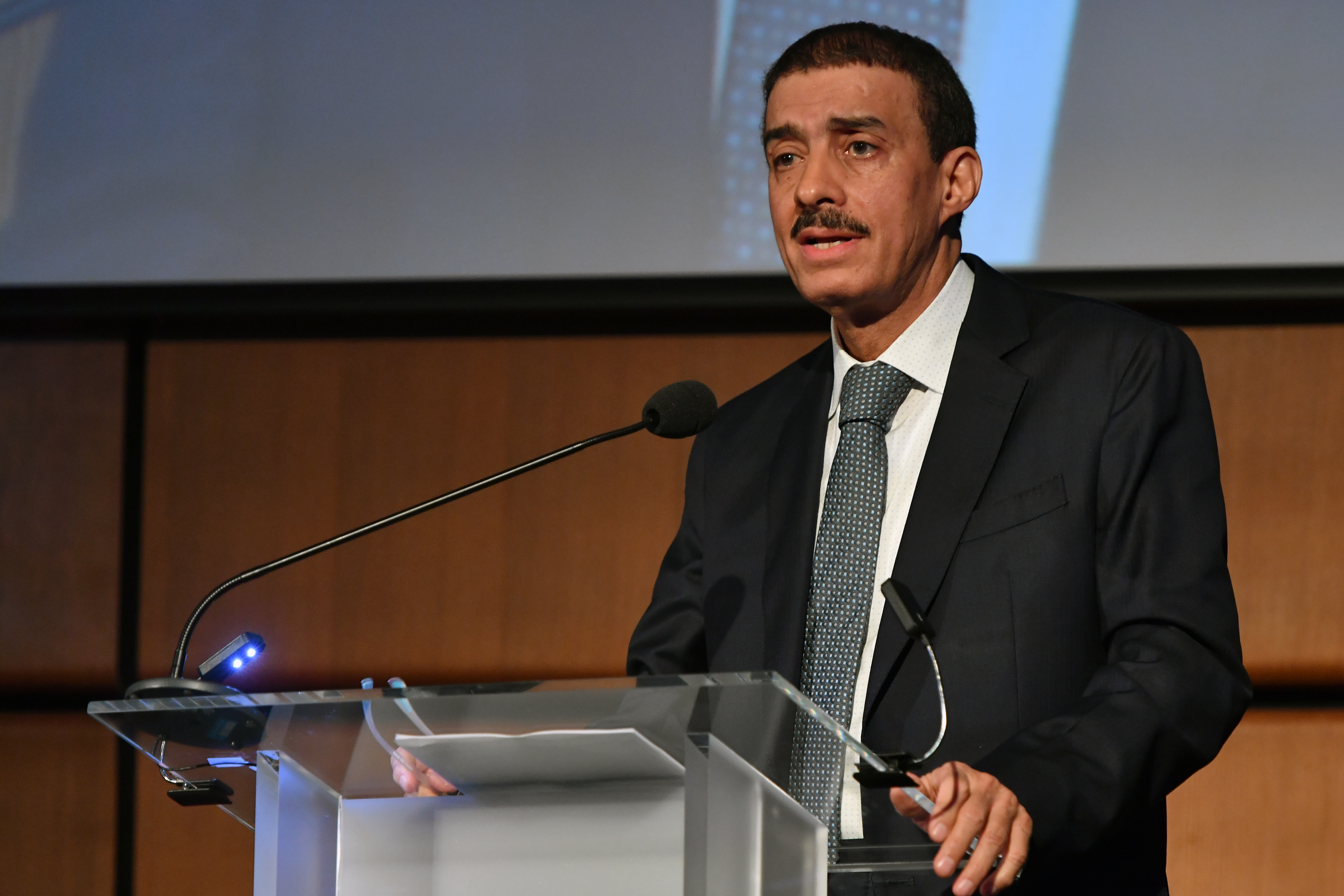

Minister of Hajj
- In office 13 December 2011 – 27 September 2015
- Prime Minister: King Abdullah
- Preceded by: Fuad bin Abdulsalam Farsi

President of the Islamic Development Bank
- In office 9 October 2016 – 9 August 2021
- Preceded by: Ahmed Mohammed Ali Al-Madani
- Succeeded by: Muhammed Al-Jasser

Personal details
- Born: 1953 (age 72–73) Madinah, Saudi Arabia
- Education: King Saud University; Indiana University; Loughborough University

Bandar Al Hajjar (Arabic: بندر حجار; born 1953) is a Saudi Arabian economist and former Hajj minister. He was removed from post over 2015 Mina disaster.

== Early life and education ==
Al Hajjar was born in Madinah in 1953. He obtained a bachelor of arts degree in economics and politics from King Saud University in 1976. He received a master's degree in economics from Indiana University in 1980. Then he obtained a PhD in economics from Loughborough University in the United Kingdom in 1989. His PhD thesis was entitled "Funding the small projects in the Kingdom of Saudi Arabia".

== Career ==
Bandar Al Hajjar began his career as the vice president of the Islamic Economy Center. He later became the vice dean of administration and economics faculty at King Saud University. His tenure lasted from 1982 to 1984. He was also a lecturer at King Abdulaziz University from 1989 to 2005. He served as a member of the Shoura Council beginning in 1997. Later he became the chair of the council's committee on foreign affairs. Then he was appointed deputy chairman of the National Society for Human Rights in 2004. He was the president of the National Society for Human Rights from 2005 to October 2008. He became vice president of the Shoura Council on 25 October 2008.

From 1996 to 2006 Bandar Al Hajjar was chief editor of Money and Markets Magazine a specialized business magazine addressing the concerns of the Arab and Islamic worlds.

He was appointed minister of Hajj on 13 December 2011, replacing Fuad bin Abdulsalam Farsi in the post. Farsi had been in office since 1999.

Hajjar was announced as the next president of Islamic Development Bank and the 41st annual session of the board of governors of IDB, held in Jakarta between 14–19 May 2016, ratified the Kingdom's nomination of Hajjar as the new president of the bank. He took the helm on 1 October 2016.

Political offices
Preceded by Fuad bin Abdulsalam Farsi	Minister of Hajj; 2011 – 27 September 2015	Succeeded by
