= Saudi Contractors Authority =

Governmental subsidiary authority which focuses on Saudi Arabia's contracting sector

- Formation: September 7, 2015; 11 years ago
- Headquarters: Riyadh, Saudi Arabia
- Region served: Saudi Arabia
- Chairman: Mr. Mohammed Abdulaziz Alajlan
- Vice Chairman: Abdulaziz Bintuwayli
- Governor: Abdulmajid AlRashoudi
- Parent organization: Ministry of Municipal and Rural Affairs
- Website: www.sca.sa

The Saudi Contractors Authority (Arabic: الهيئة السعودية للمقاولين, romanized: al-Haīʾiah as-Saʿūdīyah Lilmuqāwilīn) is an organ of Saudi Arabia's Ministry of Commerce which is concerned with the country's construction sector. Established in 2015 through a resolution of the Council of Ministers, it aims to create a secure environment for national and foreign business contractors in Saudi Arabia.

== Background ==
The SCA was established through the Council of Ministers of Saudi Arabia Resolution No. 510 dated 23/11/1436(Hijri). SCA's coordination and early functioning was led by the Saudi Ministry of Commerce and Investment

According to SCA's official website,

SCA has been established through Council of Ministries resolution No. 510 dated 23/11/1436H to organize and develop contracting sector to contribute in driving development in KSA. SCA will seek to achieve its objectives through permanent development of all related aspects of working environment to reach the highest levels of productivity and quality.

== Contractors' obligation ==
The Saudi Ministry of Finance has made it obligatory for contractors and agencies to seek registration of their firms in the Saudi Contractors Authority if they want to receive government-sponsored projects or contracts.

== Services ==
- Contractors Licenses
- Contractor's Platform
- Information Center
- Electronic Standard Contracts
- SCA Academy
- Exhibitions and Conferences
- Consulting Services
- Project Managers platform
- Projects Platform
- Contractors Rating
- Mazaya Program
- Membership Upgrade
- Call Center
