= Mohammed bin Ali Aba Al Khail =

Saudi politician (born 1935)

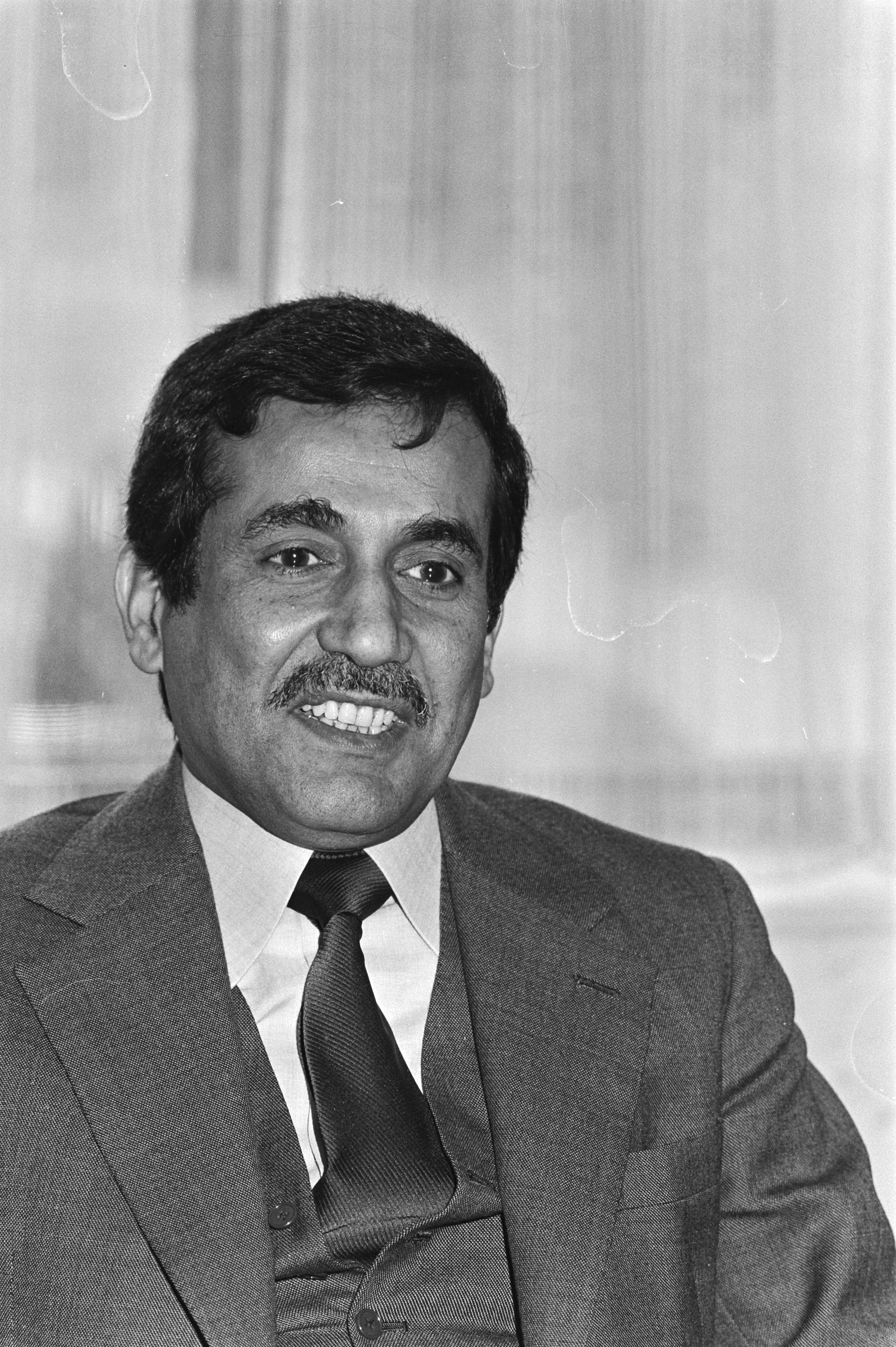
- Abalkhail in 1979

Minister of Finance and National Economy
- In office 14 October 1975 – 3 August 1995
- Prime Minister: King Khalid; King Fahd
- Preceded by: Musaid bin Abdul Rahman Al Saud
- Succeeded by: Suleiman bin Abdulaziz Al Sulaim

State Minister for Financial Affairs and National Economy
- In office 10 February 1972 – 14 October 1975
- Prime Minister: King Faisal; King Khalid

Personal details
- Born: 1935 (age 90–91) Buraidah
- Education: Cairo University

Mohammed bin Ali Aba Al Khail, also known as Mohammed bin Ali Abalkhail (Arabic: محمد بن علي أبا الخيل; born 1935), is a Saudi government official. He was the minister of finance and national economy between October 1975 and August 1995.

== Early life and education ==
Abalkhail hails from a Najdi family. He was born in Buraidah in 1935. He received a bachelor's degree in commerce from Cairo University in 1956.

== Career ==
Between 1956 and 1962 Abalkhail served as an assistant director at the ministry of communications and later, became a director. In 1962, on the request of Crown Prince Faisal he established the Institute of Public Administration in Riyadh which he headed between 1962 and 1965. In the period 1963–1970 he was the deputy minister of finance and national economy. In 1970, he was made deputy minister of state for finance and national economy. He was appointed minister of state for financial affairs and national economy on 10 February 1972. He was also made minister of state for foreign affairs and appointed a member of the Supreme Council on Petroleum in March 1973 when it was established by King Faisal.

Abalkhail was appointed minister of finance and national economy by King Khalid on 14 October 1975, replacing Musaid bin Abdul Rahman Al Saud in the post. One of the most significant official visits by Abalkhail was to Beijing, China, in November 1992 where he and Li Lanqing, Chinese minister of foreign economic relations and trade, signed various agreements on economy, commerce and investment. Abalkhail's term ended on 3 August 1995 when Suleiman bin Abdulaziz Al Sulaim was appointed to the post.

Abalkhail also served as the chairman of the Saudi International Bank in London and chairman of the Centre for Economics and Management Studies in Riyadh.

== Personal life and honors ==
Abalkhail married to his cousin in 1967. He is the recipient of the following: King Abdulaziz 2nd Class Sash; Republic Medal 2nd Class, Egypt; Niger Medal Leader Status, Niger; Pakistan Crescent Medal and Leopold II Sash, Belgium.

Political offices
Preceded by Musaid bin Abdul Rahman Al Saud	Minister of Finance and National Economy; 1975–1995	Succeeded by Suleiman bin Abdulaziz Al Sulaim
