= Ghassan Al-Shibl =

Ghassan bin Abdurrahman Al-Shibl

chairman of the board of directors of the Local Content and Government Procurement Commission
- Prime Minister: King Salman
- Incumbent: chairman of the board of directors
- Incumbent
- Assumed office 27 December 2018

Ghassan bin Abdurrahman Al-Shibl (Arabic: غسان بن عبدالرحمن الشبل) is a Saudi engineer, born in 1959, and the chairman of the board of directors of the Local Content and Government Procurement Commission appointed by King Salman on December 27, 2018. Al-shibl is also a member of Council of Economic and Development Affairs.

== Education ==
- B.S.c in Civil Engineering from King Saud University, 1982.
- M.S. in Engineering Management George Washington University, USA in 1986.
- Ph.D. degree in Engineering Management George Washington University, USA in 1990.

== Career ==
- Teaching Assistant at the university (1982 - 1983).
- Served as the director of the follow-up department, General Administration of Projects, Ministry of Interior (1983 - 1990).
- The founder of the Boroz Advanced Technology.
- Joined Advanced Electronics Company (AEC) in 1990 as vice president, chief operating officer, then became executive vice president in 1994.
- Chairman of Saudi Research and Marketing Group (SRMG), 2018.
- Chief Executive Officer, Managing Director at SRMG (2017-2018).
- Chairman of the Board at Saudi Arabian Airlines Corporation since (2017-2018).
