= Uqair salt mine =

Al-Uqair Salt mine is archaeological site located approximately 25Km Northwest of Uqair city in al-Hasa, Eastern Saudi Arabia. The site dates back to the Hellenistic period.

== Description ==
At the site surface, there are remains of walls that are approximately 10 cm to 30 cm high from the ground. Several remains of building were discovered and mapped by a Danish archaeological group in 1968. The remains, some of which dates back to Hellenistic period, include remains of square-shaped building which had two walls. The building is identified to be a fort and it was called “Sabkha fort”. The building is 49 m by 52 m and it is constructed by large stone ashlars. In the site had several shards that are comparable to the types found in Thaj and Hellenistic Bahrain. There are other remains of other buildings located to the East and Southeast of the fort. To the Southwest of the fort, there is a group of walled graves .

Visible remains of the site are scattered and cover an area of 10 square kilometres. There is a network of channels that stand out of the surrounding eroded ground. The network of channels appears like are of irrigated land in aerial photographs. Items found in salt mine site include shell, copper, ceramic and stone items (including pebble, chert, flint, quern and steatite.
