= Muhammed Al-Jasser =

Saudi economist

Muhammad Al Jasser
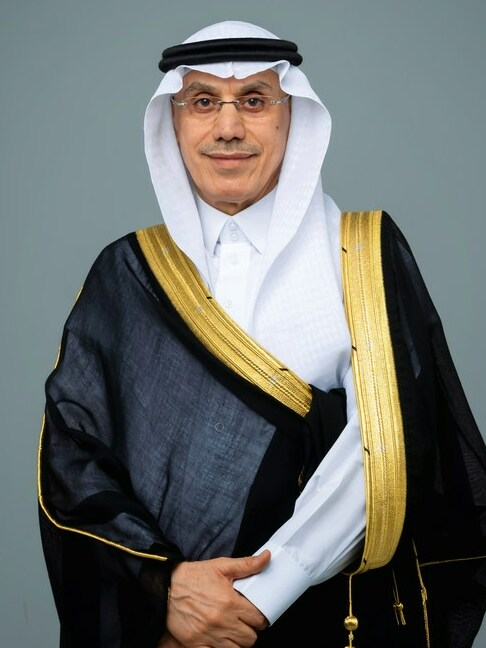

President of the Islamic Development Bank
- Incumbent
- Assumed office 9 August 2021
- Preceded by: Bandar Al Hajjar

Minister of Economy and Planning
- In office 13 December 2011 – 29 April 2015
- Prime Minister: King Abdullah
- Preceded by: Khalid bin Mohammed Al Gosaibi
- Succeeded by: Adel Fakeih

Governor of the Saudi Arabian Monetary Agency (SAMA)
- In office 28 February 2009 – 13 December 2011
- Preceded by: Hamad Al Sayari
- Succeeded by: Fahad Al Mubarak

Personal details
- Born: Muhammad bin Sulaiman Al-Jasser; 1955 (age 70–71) Buraidah, Saudi Arabia
- Education: San Diego State University; University of California, Riverside

Dr. Muhammad bin Sulaiman Al-Jasser (Arabic: محمد سليمان الجاسر; born 1955) is a Saudi economist who is currently the chairman of the Islamic Development Bank (IsDB) group former advisor at the General Secretariat of the Council of Ministers of Saudi Arabia and chairman of the General Authority for Competition. He served as minister of economy and planning between 2011 and 2015. He also previously served as governor and board chairman of the Saudi Arabian Central Bank (SAMA) between 2009 and 2011. Prior to that, he served as executive director at the International Monetary Fund (IMF) between 1990 and 1995.

== Early life and education ==
Al Jasser was born in Buraidah in 1955. He studied economics at San Diego State University (BA in 1979), and the University of California, Riverside (MA in 1981 and PhD in 1986).

== Career ==
Al Jasser began his career at the Saudi finance ministry in 1981. He was named the executive director for Saudi Arabia at the International Monetary Fund (IMF) in 1988. His tenure lasted until 1995. He joined the Saudi Arabian Monetary Authority (SAMA) in 1995 as vice governor of SAMA and vice chairman of the SAMA board. He served in this post until 2009. He was also named as acting deputy minister of finance and national economy for budget and organization in 1995. He served as the director of the Saudi Arabian Mining Company until 2009.

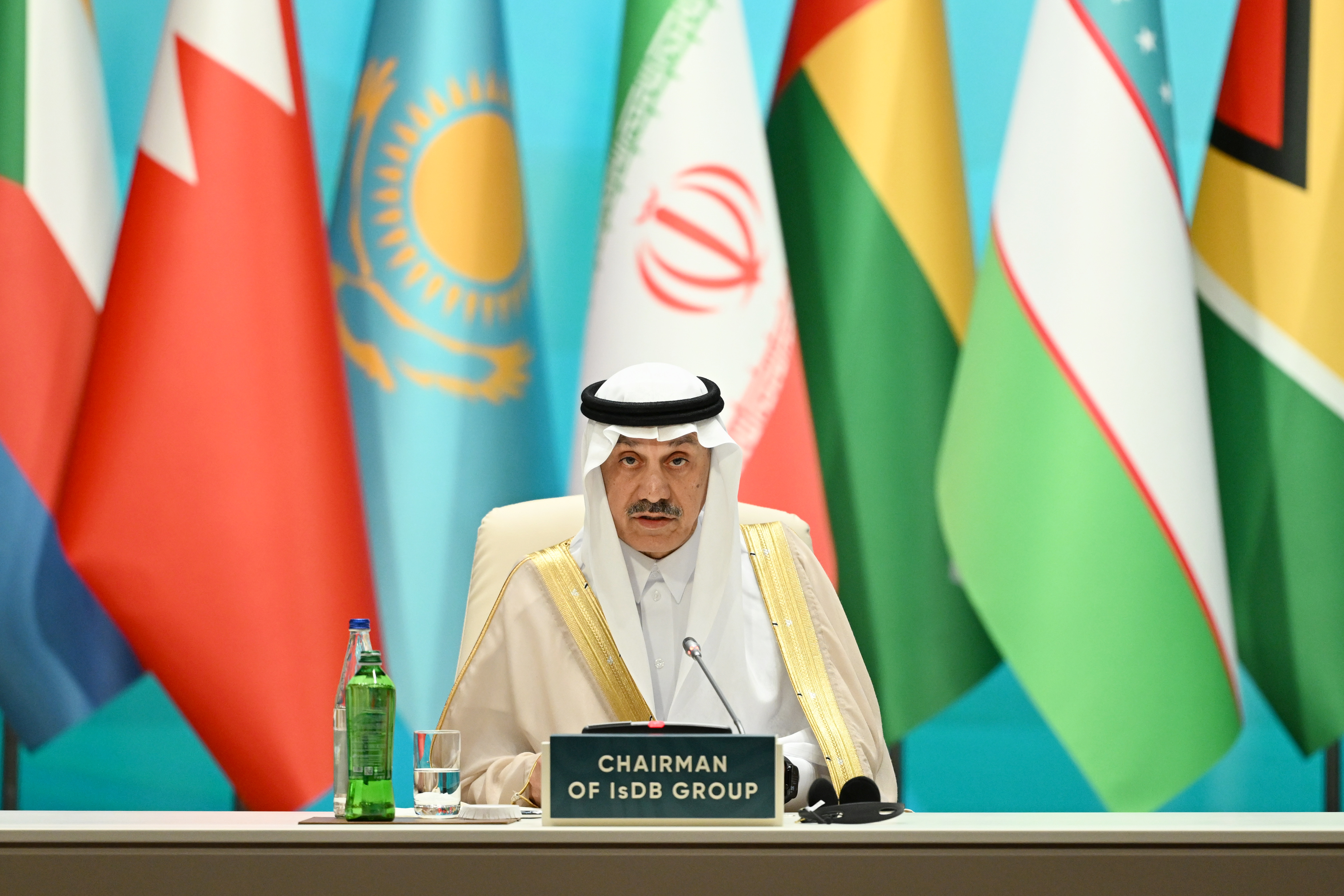
Al Jasser at the 2026 Annual Meetings of the IsDB

Al Jasser became governor of SAMA in February 2009, replacing Hamad Al Sayari. He was also appointed the first chairman of the Gulf Monetary Council on 30 March 2010. The task of this organisation is to establish a united central bank and common currency for the Gulf Cooperation Council (GCC). He also chaired state-controlled Saudi Telecom, and is a member on the boards of various national and regional finance institutions including the Islamic Development Bank and Arab Monetary Fund. Al Jasser was appointed minister of economy and planning on 13 December 2011, replacing Khalid bin Mohammed Al Gosaibi, who had been in the post since 2003. Al Jasser's term as minister of economy and planning ended on 29 April 2015 when he was replaced by Adel Fakeih in the post.

== Recognition and honors ==
Al Jasser is described as a well-regarded technocrat by James Reeve, senior economist at Samba Financial Group in London.

Al Jasser is the recipient of the King Abdulaziz Medal of the First Order. In 2009, he was named by the Middle East as one of the 50 most influential Arabs in the world.

Preceded by Khalid bin Mohammed Al Gosaibi	Minister of Economy and Planning; 2011-2015	Succeeded by Adel Fakeih
