= Adel Fakeih =

Saudi Arabian engineer and politician (born 1959)

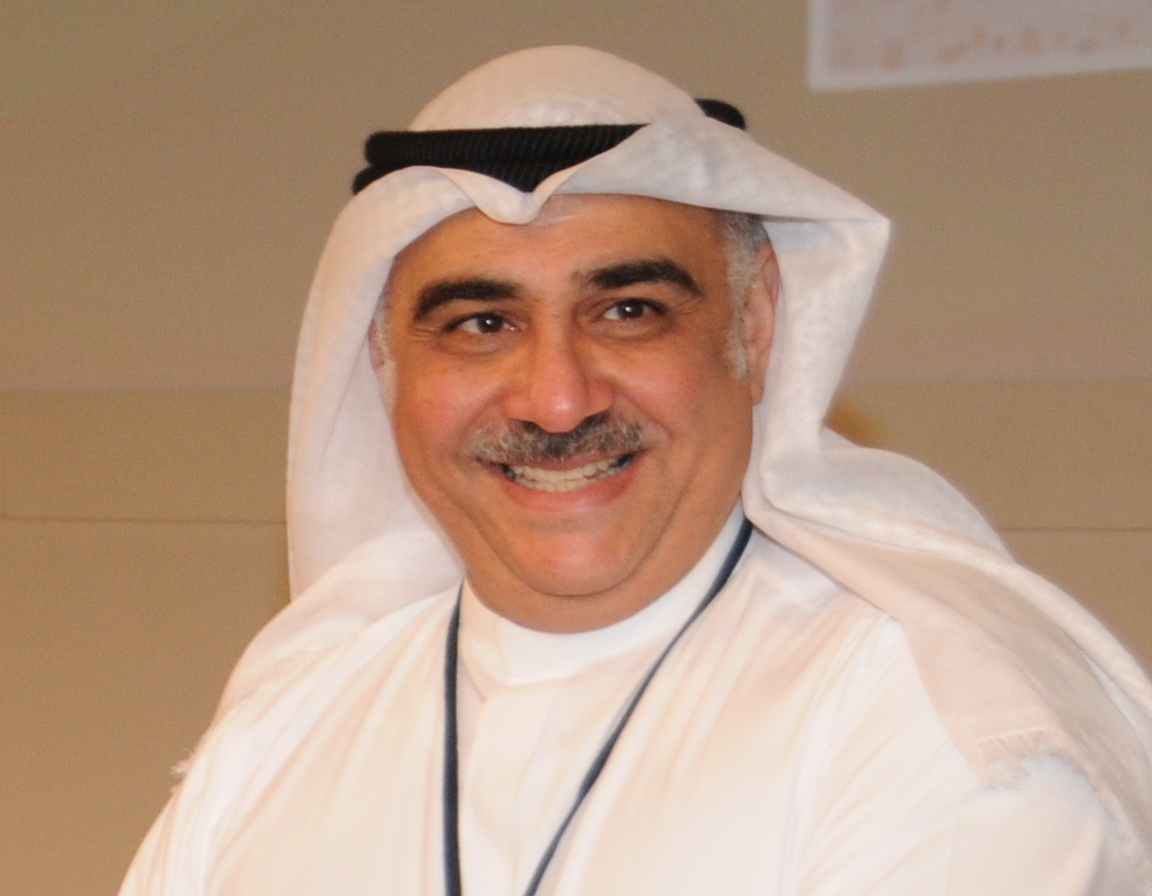

Minister of Economy and Planning
- In office 29 April 2015 – 4 November 2017
- Prime Minister: King Salman
- Preceded by: Muhammed Al Jasser
- Succeeded by: Muhammed Al Tuwaijri

Minister of Labor
- In office 18 August 2010 – 29 April 2015
- Prime Minister: King Abdullah; King Salman
- Preceded by: Ghazi Abdul Rahman Al Gosaibi
- Succeeded by: Mufrej bin Saad Al Haqbani

Minister of Health
- In office 21 April 2014 – 8 December 2014
- Prime Minister: King Abdullah
- Preceded by: Abdullah bin Abdulaziz Al Rabiah
- Succeeded by: Mohammed bin Ali bin Hiazaa Al Hiazaa

Mayor of Jeddah
- In office March 2005 – August 2010
- Prime Minister: King Fahd; King Abdullah
- Succeeded by: Hani Abu Ras

Personal details
- Born: Adel bin Muhammad Fakeih; 1959 (age 66–67) Mecca, Saudi Arabia
- Spouse: Maha Fitaihi
- Education: King Abdulaziz University

Adel Fakeih (Arabic:عادل فقيه; born 1 July 1959) is a Saudi Arabian engineer and the former mayor of Jeddah. He was the minister of labor from August 2010 to April 2015, minister of health between April 2014 and December 2014, and minister of economy and planning between 2015 and 2017. He has been in detention since November 2017.

== Early life and education ==
Fakeih was born in Mecca in 1959 into a family known for its active members in the fields of finance and business. His father was a businessman and published poet, and his uncle is chair of the Fakeih Group. He obtained a degree in industrial engineering from King Abdulaziz University.

== Career ==
Fakeih worked in both private and public sectors, holding several prominent positions such as Chairman of Al Jazeera Bank and a member on the board of directors of the Trade and Industrial Chamber of Commerce in Jeddah. He served as a member on the commissions of different organizations, including the Holy Mecca Provincial Council, the Supreme Commission for Tourism and Antiquities, the Royal Commission for Jubail and Yanbu, the Fund for Management of Human resources, the Hail Development Authority, the Power Services Regulation Authority, and the Al Marai Group. He was chairman of the council of directors of the Saudi Arabian Glass Company and the Sagco.

=== Chairman of Savola ===
From 1993 to 2005 he served as the chairman of the Savola Group, Saudi Arabia's biggest food company. During this period, from 2003 to 2005, he was also the chairman of the Jeddah Chamber of Commerce and Industry.

=== Mayor of Jeddah ===
Adel Fakeih was appointed mayor of Jeddah in March 2005.

In 2006, the project to turn the Old Airport of Jeddah into a new 12 million m^{2} city was launched. In 2008, the Central Jeddah Redevelopment Project, which consisted of revitalizing a 6 million m^{2} area including the historic downtown, was also launched. In 2009, the city of Jeddah revealed the project for the construction of the King Abdullah Sports City. The city unlocked a $1.3 billion budget to further develop the city's infrastructure that same year, for the construction of bridges, tunnels, roads and parks in Jeddah. In 2009, he collaborated with a recruitment initiative targeting Saudi locals, Bab Rizq Jameel, and dedicated 22 market stalls to Saudi women in the Al-Safa neighborhood (northern Jeddah) to use for displaying and selling merchandise.

He was replaced by Hani Abu Ras as mayor in August 2010.

=== Minister of labor ===
On 18 August 2010, Adel Fakeih was appointed minister of labor, replacing Ghazi Abdul Rahman Al Gosaibi.

In 2014, Adel Fakeih signed a memorandum of understanding with the Sri Lankan minister of foreign employment promotion and welfare Dilan Perera to improve the rights of Sri Lankan household workers in the Kingdom, regarding their passports and salaries. He reviewed estimated figures by the Central Department of Statistics following discrepancies between unemployment data and the number of applicants to the national monthly unemployment allowance. In June 2011, he introduced the Nitaqat program. It reviewed the existing quota system and made it more effective as it took into account the different sectors and sizes of companies. It also enforced sanctions on delinquent firms: following a 2013 crackdown on the black market in foreign labor, over a million people left the country. He announced 38 amendments to the country's labor legislation including more training for Saudi workers, longer fixed-term contracts, and greater inspection powers for ministry officials.

On 21 April 2014, Adel Fakeih also served as minister of Health to handle a major public health crisis when the Middle East respiratory syndrome broke out, replacing Abdullah bin Abdulaziz Al Rabiah who had served since February 2009. This term ended on 8 December 2014 when Mohammed bin Ali bin Hiazaa Al Hiazaa was appointed to the post.

=== Minister of economy and planning ===
Adel Fakeih's term as minister of labor ended in April 2015 when he was appointed minister of economy and planning. He replaced Muhammed Al Jasser in the post, and was commissioned by Crown Prince Mohammad bin Salman to develop reforms aimed at ending the Kingdom's vulnerability to an unpredictable oil market.

In February 2016, Adel Fakeih's Economy and Planning Ministry was reported to have collaborated with the Crown Prince to develop a national transformation plan to this effect, which was officially introduced as Vision 2030 in April that same year. In March 2017, he played a forefront role at a Saudi-Chinese Investment Forum in Riyadh during which 45 agreements were signed between China and the Kingdom. In April 2017, he received South Korean Minister of Trade, Industry and Energy Joo Hyung-hwan to strengthen bilateral trades between the two countries, in light of the Kingdom's industries' diversification from oil. He also joined the board of the Public Investment Fund.

He was removed from his position after the Royal Decree announced on 4 November 2017, replaced by his deputy Mohammad Al Tuwaijri, who was also the former Head of Global Banking and Markets, Middle East and North Africa (MENA) at The Saudi British Bank.

== Arrest ==
On 4 November 2017, Adel Fakeih was arrested in the 2017 Saudi Arabian purge conducted by a new royal anti-corruption committee. In January 2019 Reuters reported that he was not released yet.

== Personal life ==
Fakeih's wife, Maha Fitaihi, is a leading businesswoman and social figure. They have five children.

Political offices
| Preceded by Ghazi Al Gosaibi | Labor Minister of Saudi Arabia; 2010 – 2015 | Succeeded by Mufrej bin Saad Al Haqbani |
