= General Authority for Statistics =

Government agency in Saudi Arabia

- الهيئة العامة للإحصاء

Agency overview
- Formed: 2015; 11 years ago
- Jurisdiction: Government of Saudi Arabia
- Headquarters: Riyadh, Saudi Arabia
- Website: www.stats.gov.sa/en/

The General Authority for Statistics (GASTAT; Arabic: الهيئة العامة للإحصاء) is a government agency in Saudi Arabia responsible for the implementation of statistical works including the conducting of national surveys.

== History ==
The statistical works in Saudi Arabia started early by establishing the Central Department of Statistics and Information in 1960 to be responsible for national statistics and information. In 2015, the Central Department of Statistics and Information was transformed into a public authority called the General Authority for Statistics.

== Structure and responsibilities ==
The authority is governed by a board of directors that is headed by the Minister of Economy and Planning and formed by 15 relevant government entities and private sector institutions.

The responsibilities of the authority were defined by Article 4 of the Council of Ministers’ Resolution No. (11) issued in 2015. These responsibilities include developing the statistical work methodology, preparing and implementing surveys, conducting statistical research and analyzing data and information.
