= Ministry of Finance (Saudi Arabia) =

Government ministry of Saudi Arabia

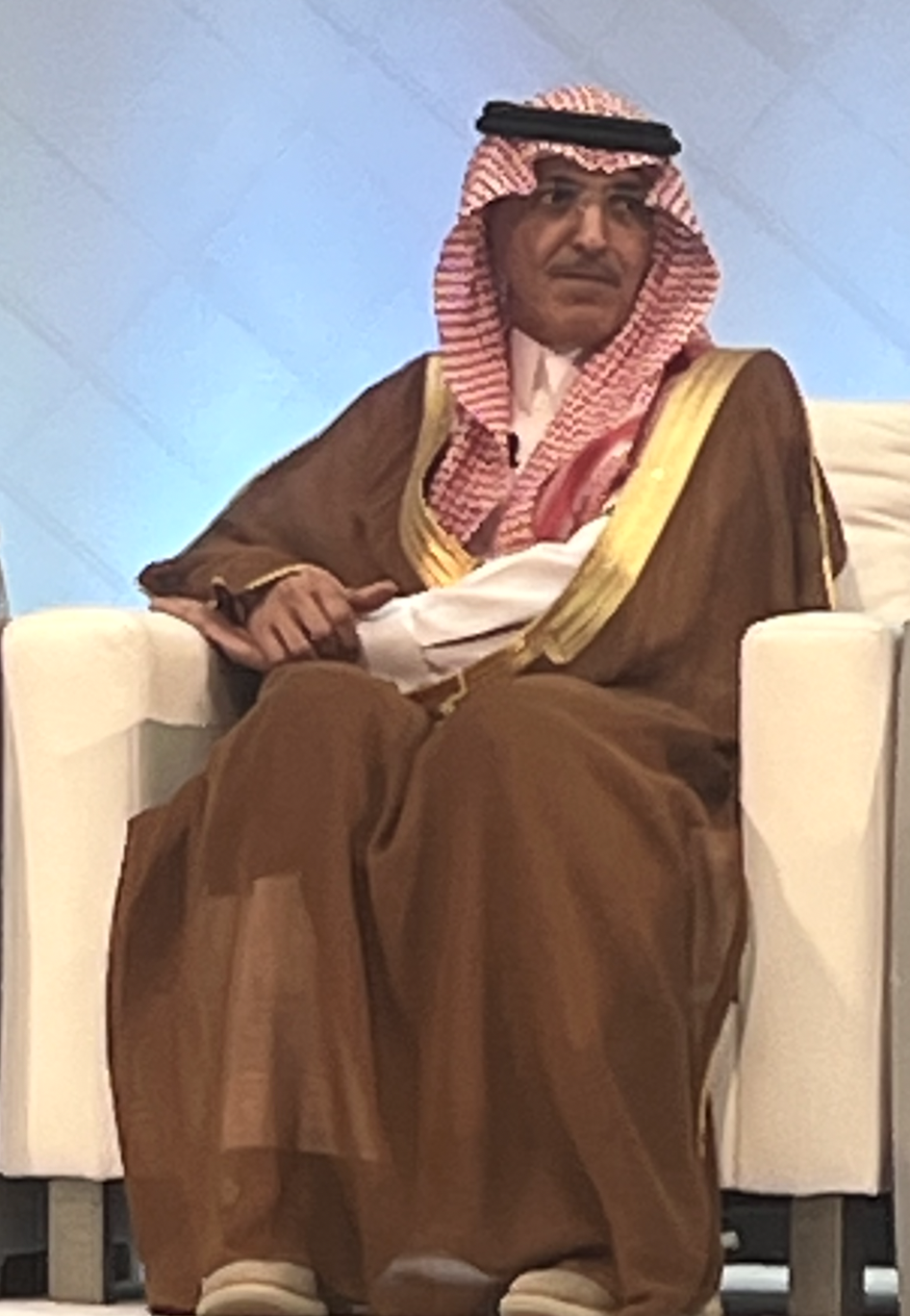
- Mohammed Al-Jadaan, the current Minister of Finance since 2016

Government agency overview
- Formed: 14 May 1932
- Jurisdiction: Government of Saudi Arabia
- Headquarters: Riyadh, Saudi Arabia
- Minister responsible: Mohammed Al-Jadaan
- Website: Official English Website

The Ministry of Finance (MoF; Arabic: وزارة المالية) of Saudi Arabia is the principal body for controlling state expenditure in Saudi Arabia. It is currently led by Mohammed Al-Jadaan.

== History ==
When instructions were issued by the Kingdom of Hejaz that financial matters were to be managed by a finance directorate, a single entity in the form of a General Directorate of Finance was established on 14 October 1927. Royal Order No. 381 was issued on 14 May 1932 changing the name of the General Directorate of Finance to the Ministry of Finance, thus becoming the second ministry to be established after the Ministry of Foreign Affairs. The Ministry of Finance was tasked with regulating, managing and securing the collection of state funds, and oversight of expenditures, and became the general authority for financial matters in the Kingdom of Hejaz and Nejd and its territories. Royal Decree No. 1697 was issued on 27 June 1953 establishing the Ministry of Economy to replace the Bureau for Economic Affairs. Royal Decree No. 31 was issued on 4 September 1954 merging the Ministry of Economy and the Ministry of Finance into a single ministry called the Ministry of Finance and National Economy. Royal Order No. 2/A was issued on 1 May 2003 transferring responsibility for economic activity from the above-mentioned ministry to the Ministry of Planning, thus changing the name of the Ministry of Finance and National Economy to the Ministry of Finance, and the name of the Ministry of Planning to the Ministry of Economy and Planning.

The Ministry owns the Istidama Holding Company, which on 23 April 2018, received the 36.2% stake of the Saudi Binladin Group owned by Bakr bin Laden and his brothers Saleh and Saad.

== Government bodies established by the Ministry of Finance ==
In 1936, as the activities of the Ministry of Finance expanded in scope, a number of general directorates were established within the ministry (later turned into independent government bodies), including:

- Petroleum and Minerals Directorate
- Public Works Directorate
- Customs Directorate
- Agriculture Directorate
- Hajj, Endowment and Radio Affairs
- Personnel and Retirement Bureau
- Labor Bureau
- Institute of Public Administration
- Postal Directorates
- Roads Authority
- Railway Authority
- Real Estate Development Fund
- Saudi Industrial Development Fund
- Saudi Credit & Saving Bank
- Agriculture Development Fund
- Public Investment Fund
- General Authority of Zakat & Tax
- Public Pension Agency
- General Authority of Statistics
- Urban Projects Bureau
- Saudi Contractors Authority

=== Functions ===
One of the tasks of the ministry is to collect zakat from companies owned by Saudi citizens and citizens of other Gulf countries. The ministry transfers these funds to the Ministry of Social Affairs which allocates them to unemployment programs and social security payments.

== Ministers ==
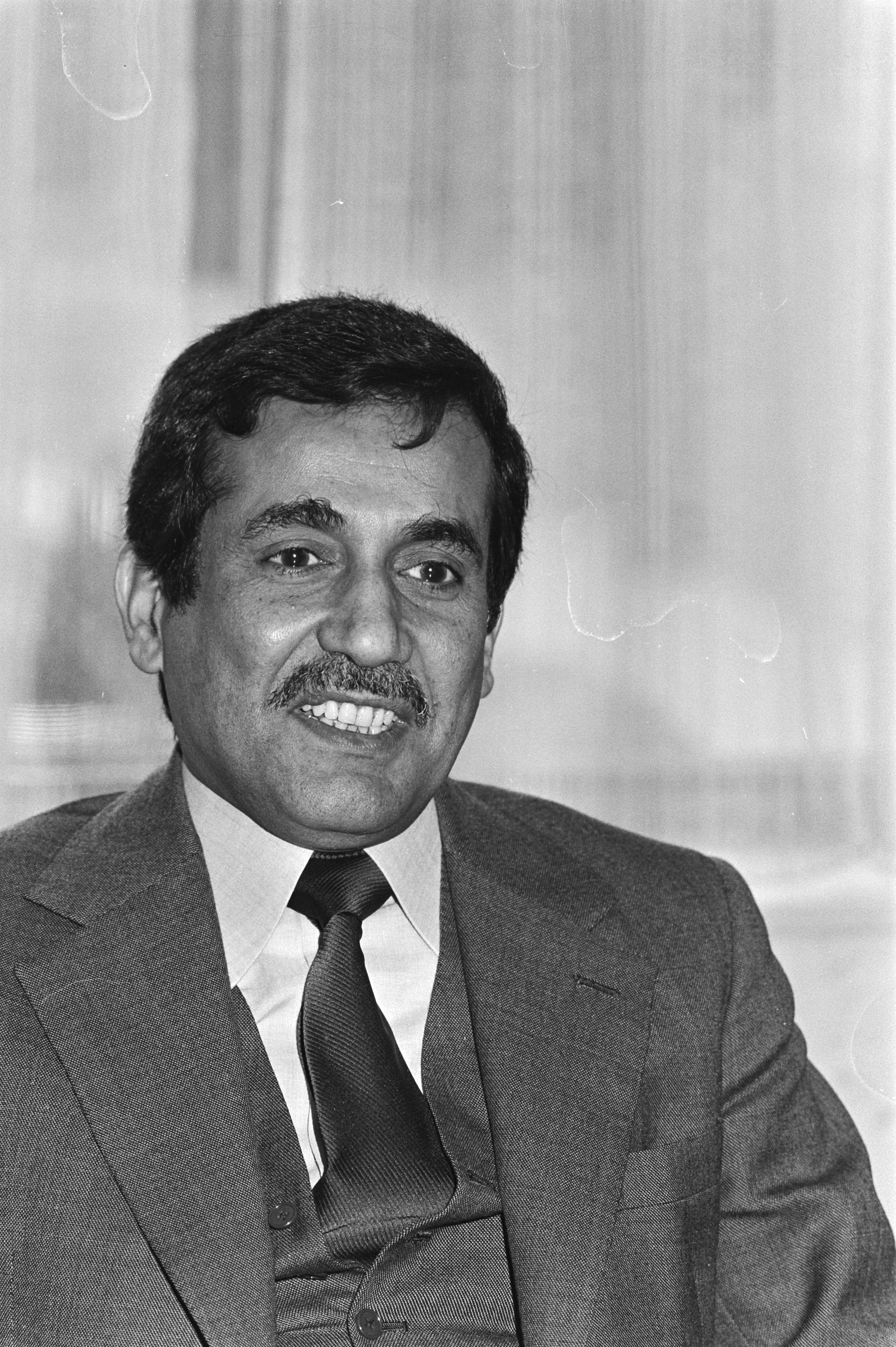
Mohammed bin Ali Aba Al Khail in 1979

The ministers of finance have been:

- Abdullah bin Suleiman Al Hamdan (14 August 1932 – 14 April 1954)
- Mohammed Suroor Sabban (14 April 1954 – 22 February 1958)
- Abdullah bin Abdul Rahman Adwan (22 February 1958 – 28 July 1958)
- Faisal bin Abdulaziz Al Saud (28 July 1958 – 30 August 1960)
- Talal bin Abdulaziz Al Saud (30 August 1960 – 11 September 1961)
- Muhammed bin Saud Al Saud (11 September 1961 – 15 September 1961)
- Nawwaf bin Abdulaziz Al Saud (15 September 1961 – 16 March 1962)
- Musaid bin Abdul Rahman Al Saud (16 March 1962 – 14 October 1975)
- Mohammed bin Ali Aba Al Khail (14 October 1975 – 3 August 1995)
- Suleiman bin Abdelaziz Al Sulaim (3 August 1995 – 10 October 1995)
- Abdulaziz Abdullah Al Khuwaiter (10 October 1995 – 30 January 1996)
- Ibrahim Abdulaziz Al Assaf (30 January 1996 – 1 November 2016)
- Mohammed Al Jadaan (1 November 2016 – present)

== See also ==
- Ministries of Saudi Arabia
