= Sacred sites in Mecca =

Islamic holy sites in the city of Mecca, Saudi Arabia

sacred sites in Mecca
- Location: Mecca, Saudi Arabia
- Type: Sacred sites

The Sacred Sites in Mecca are ritually important sites in Mecca that were mentioned in the Quran and are visited by pilgrims during the annual Hajj. These sites are Mina, Arafat, and Muzdalifah.

== Mina ==
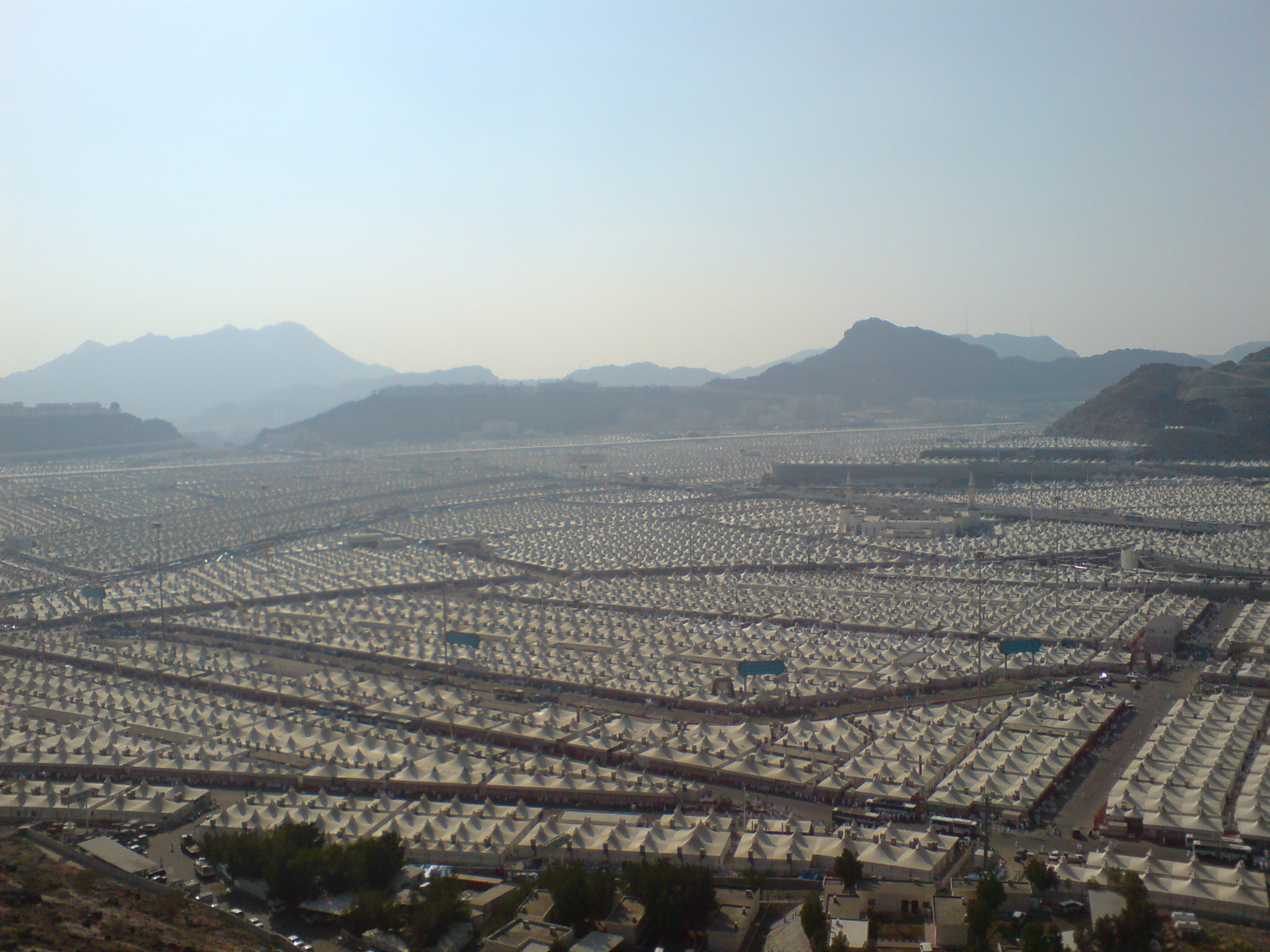
Mina overview

It is a valley surrounded by mountains and is considered one of the sacred sites situated 6 km to the east of the city of Mecca. It is a remarkable site due to its role that it plays during Hajj, where pilgrims spend most of their time in Mina. It contains the three stone pillars (Jamarat).

== Arafat ==
Arafat is a hill situated about 20 km east of central Mecca. It is a crucial site to Muslim pilgrims who have to go to Arafat on the 9th of the month of Dhu al-Hijjah.

== Muzdalifah ==
Muzdalifah, the third sacred site, near to Mecca and southeast of Mina located between Mina and Arafat.

== See also ==
- List of religious sites
- Sacred site
