= Supreme Economic Council of Saudi Arabia =

Former Governmental organization in Saudi Arabia

Supreme Economic Council
Agency overview
- Headquarters: Riyadh, Saudi Arabia
- Website: Supreme Economic Council

The Supreme Economic Council (Arabic: المجلس الاقتصادي الأعلى, romanized: Almajlis Alaiqtisadiu Al'aelaa) of the Kingdom of Saudi Arabia was a governmental organization where the Saudi head of state and various ministers meet to regulate the national economy. This organization was abolished and replaced by the Council of Economic and Development Affairs (Saudi Arabia) following reorganization of the Saudi government in 2015.

== Council Members ==
The Supreme Economic Council was chaired by the Custodian of the Two Holy Mosques, King Abdullah bin Abdulazziz Al-Saud, and the Crown Prince Deputy Prime Minister served as deputy chair.

The Council had the following members: the Chairman of the General Committee of the Council of Minister, two Ministers of State who are also members of the Council of Ministers, the Minister of Water and Electricity, the Minister of Trade and Industry, the Minister of Petroleum and Mineral Resources, the Minister of Finance, the Minister of Economy and Planning, the Minister of Labor and Social Affairs and the Governor of the Saudi Arabian Monetary Agency.

Supreme Economic Council Members (2014)
Chair	The Custodian of the Two Holy Mosques, King Abdullah bin Abdulazziz Al-Saud
Deputy Chairman	Prince Salman bin Abdulaziz, the Crown Prince, Deputy Prime Minister, Minister of Defense
Members	Prince Saud bin Faisal bin Abdulaziz; Prince Mohammed bin Nayef bin Abdulaziz; Minister of State and member of the Council of Ministers, Abdulaziz Al-Khuwaiter; The Minister of Labor; Minister of State and member of the Council of Ministers, Motleb bin Abdullah Al-Nafisah; The Minister of Trade and Industry; The Minister of Petroleum and Mineral Resources; The Minister of Finance; The Minister of Economy and Planning; The Minister of Water and Electricity; The Governor of Saudi Arabian Monetary Agency; The Secretary-General of Supreme Economic Council
The Secretary General	Majid Abdullah Ibrahim Al-Moneef the Secretary General
