= Mohammed Al-Jadaan =

Saudi Arabian politician and lawyer

His Excellency Mohammed Al-Jadaan
- محمد بن عبد الله الجدعان
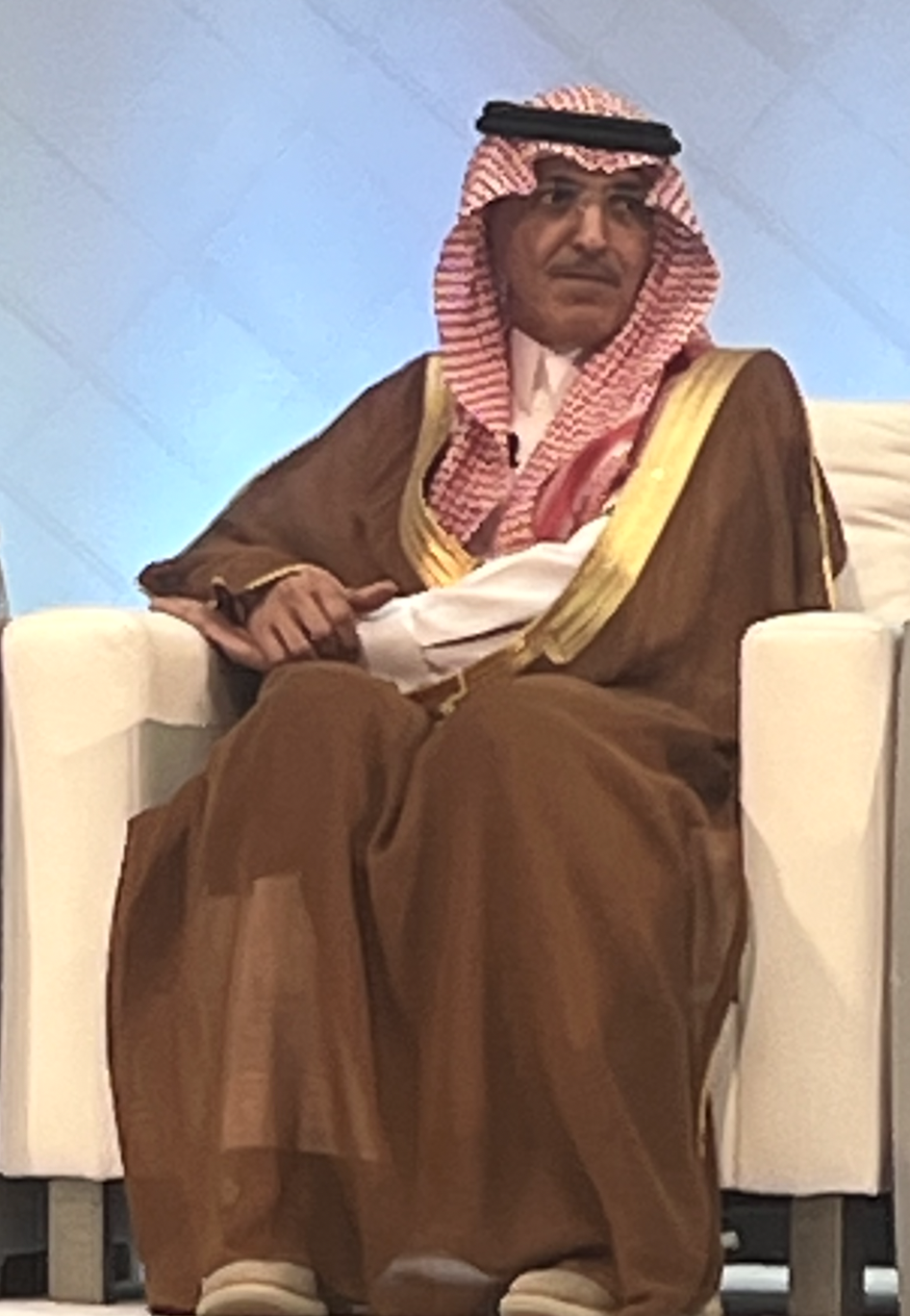
- Al-Jadaan in 2025

Minister of Finance
- Incumbent
- Assumed office 1 November 2016
- Monarch: Salman
- Prime Minister: Salman (2016–2022); Mohammad bin Salman (2022–present)
- Preceded by: Ibrahim Abdulaziz Al-Assaf

Minister of Economy and Planning (Acting)
- In office March 2020 – May 2021
- Preceded by: Mohammad Al-Tuwaijri
- Succeeded by: Faisal F. Alibrahim

Personal details
- Born: Mohammed bin Abdullah Al Jadaan; 1963 (age 62–63)

Mohammed bin Abdullah Al-Jadaan (Arabic: محمد بن عبد الله الجدعان; born 1963) is a commercial lawyer and co-founder of Al-Jadaan and Partners Law Firm who has served as Saudi Arabia's Minister of Finance since November 2016. He served as Acting Minister of Economy and Planning from March 2020 until 2021.

On 6 March 2020, King Salman issued a royal order, appointing Mohammed Al Jadaan as acting Minister of Economy and Planning in addition to his work as Minister of Finance, replacing Mohammad Al-Tuwaijri in the post.

Prior to his appointment as Minister of Finance, Mohammed Al-Jadaan was the chairman of Capital Markets Authority where he oversaw the opening of the Tadawul Stock Exchange and the loosening of Saudi's regulatory framework to foreign investors. He also previously served as a special adviser to the board of Morgan Stanley Saudi Arabia.

Political offices
Preceded by Ibrahim Abdulaziz Al-Assaf	Minister of Finance; 2016-present	Incumbent
