= Mohammad Al-Tuwaijri =

Saudi Arabian politician

Mohammad Bin Mazyad Al-Tuwaijri
- محمد مزيد التويجري
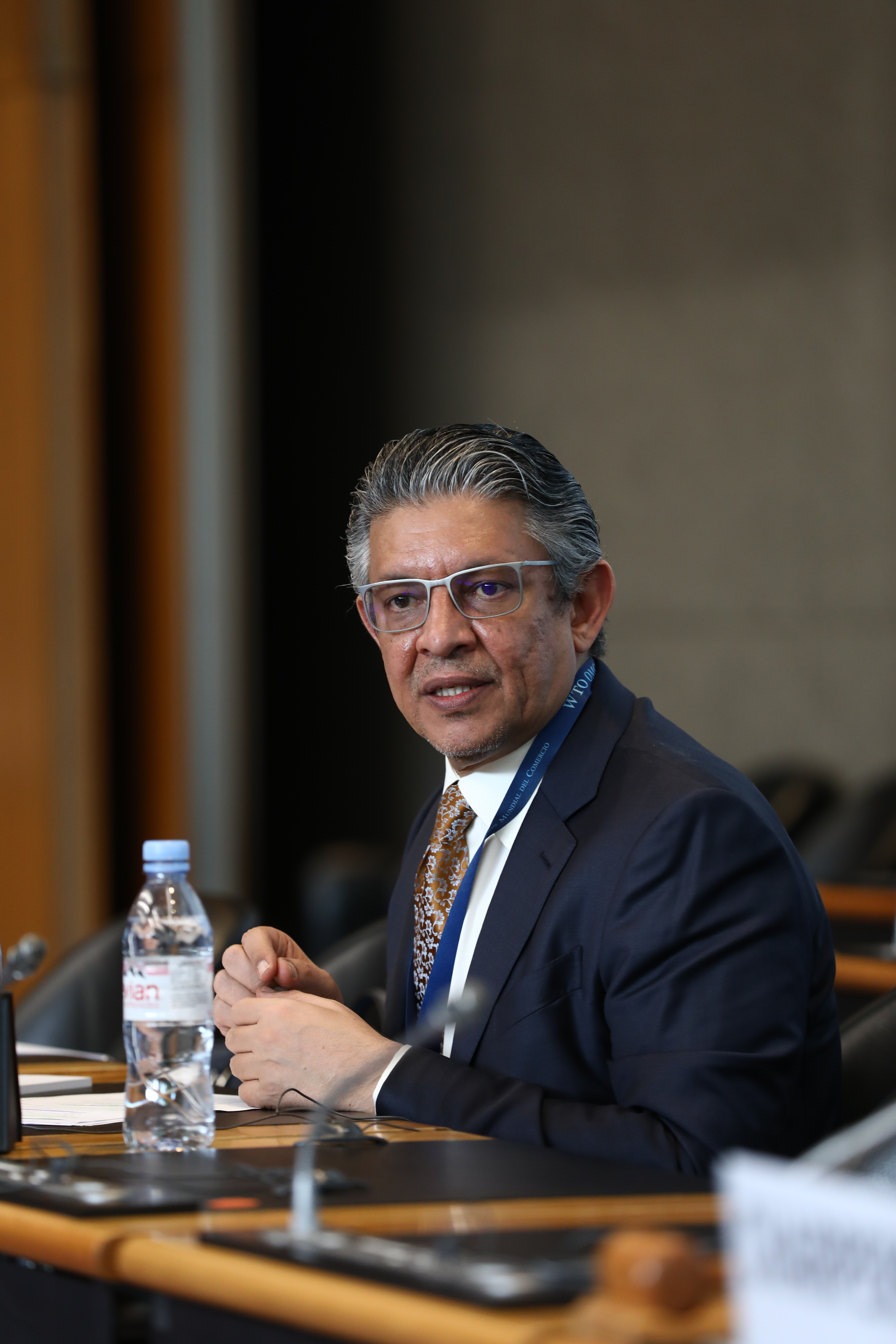

Minister of Economy and Planning
- In office 2017–2020
- Preceded by: Adel Fakeih
- Succeeded by: Faisal Alibrahim

Personal details
- Born: Saudi Arabia
- Education: King Faisal Air College (BS); King Saud University (MBA)

Mohammad Bin Mazyad Al-Tuwaijri (Arabic: محمد مزيد التويجري) is a Saudi Arabian politician, a minister ranked advisor at the Royal Court, ex-minister of Economy and Planning (2017–2020). His prior experience includes the role of group managing director of HSBC Holdings PLC MENA & Turkey from 2013 to 2016. He was also the managing director of J.P. Morgan from 2007 to 2010, and started his banking career in 1995 with the Saudi British Bank (SABB), where he became the head of treasury.

== Academic background ==
Al-Tuwaijri holds a Bachelor of Science degree in Aviation Science from King Faisal Air College. He earned his Master's degree in Business Administration with honors from King Saud University.

== Air force experience ==
Al-Tuwaijri was an air force pilot for the Saudi Air Force. He flew a Tornado, a British fighter jet.

He flew over 30 war missions during the first Gulf War between 1990 and 1991 – flying 100 ft above ground, deep behind enemy lines at 700 knots speed, usually at night.

== Banking experience ==
In 1995, Al-Tuwaijri joined SABB as Head of Risk Management in the Treasury, then became Deputy Treasurer and finally earned the role of Group Head of Treasury.

In 2007, he took the role of Managing Director and CEO of J.P. Morgan Saudi Arabia, setting up the bank's presence in Saudi Arabia.

He also led major capital market transactions like the mining company Ma’aden IPO and a major secondary offering of Saudi Mobily Co. a telecom operator owned by UAE Etisalat.

In 2010 he took on the role of Group Managing Director, Deputy Chairman and CEO of HSBC Bank Middle East, North Africa and Turkey. Head of Global Banking and Markets Division- Middle East and North Africa.

== Government experience – minister of economy and planning 2017–2020 ==
In his role as minister of economy and planning, Al-Tuwaijri's priorities included the establishment and oversight of initiatives related to Vision 2030, such as the National Transformation Program and Privatization Program. These aimed to diversify the Kingdom's economy away from oil, simplifying business regulation to stimulate the economy.

Al-Tuwaijri spearheaded an effort to increase the reliance on an empirical, evidence based approach to policy formulation for the Kingdom, to ensure the increased efficiency of the government apparatus, all the while decreasing the instances of double work.

He engaged with the IMF and World Bank Group as a government and private sector representative concerning global issues and policy design, including Article IV analysis on Saudi Arabia’s economic agenda. He also engaged with the OECD in developing an economic policy design framework.

== World Trade Organisation Director General nomination ==
On July 8, 2020 it was announced that Mohammad Al-Tuwaijri will be the Kingdom of Saudi Arabia's nominee for the role director general at the World Trade Organisation. The nomination came nearly a month after WTO released a 125-page report stating that Saudi Arabia breached international law, as it was distributing pirated content via its pay-per-view service, beoutQ.

On 17 August, 19 human rights organizations urged the member countries of WTO to reject Saudi Arabia’s nominee for the Director General’s post. The appeal stated that being a high-ranking official of Saudi government, Tuwaijri remained silent of the Kingdom’s repressive records and was complicit in the country’s human rights violations. On 7 October 2020, it was reported that Al-Tuwaijri failed to secure enough support to win the bid to become WTO’s Director General. He got out of the race in the second round, along with UK’s Liam Fox and Kenya’s Amina Chawahir Mohamed Jibril, leaving two women, Nigeria’s Ngozi Okonjo-Iweala and South Korea’s Yoo Myung-hee to proceed to the final round.
