= Economy of Saudi Arabia =

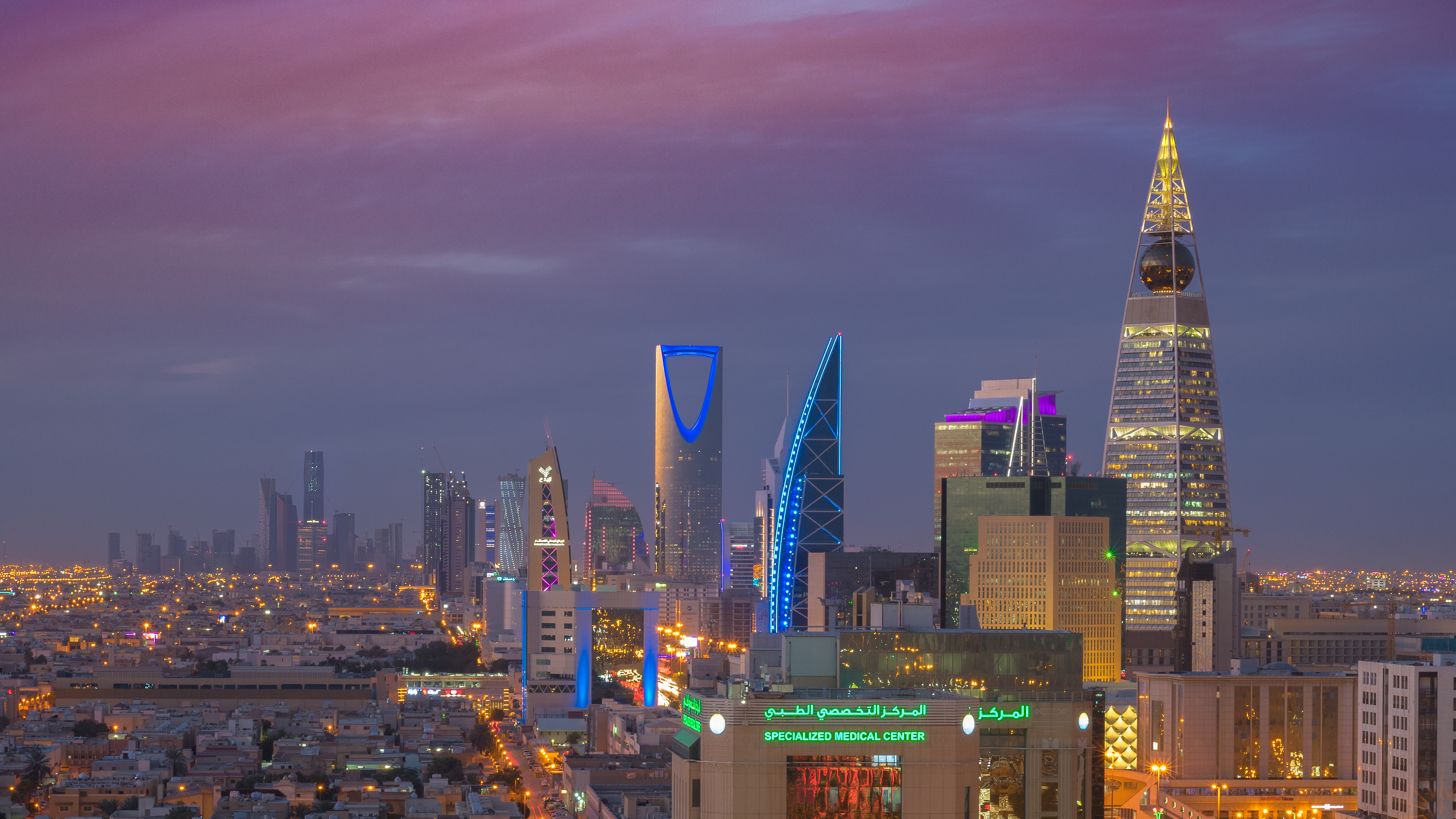
- Riyadh, the financial center of Saudi Arabia
- Currency: Saudi riyal (SAR,)
- Fixed exchange rates: 1 USD = 3.75 SAR
- Fiscal year: Calendar year
- Trade organisations: G20, OPEC, WTO, and GCC
- Country group: Developing/Emerging; High-income economy

Statistics
- Population: ▲32,175,224 (2022 census)
- GDP: ▲$1.389 trillion (nominal, 2026) ▲$2.895 trillion (PPP, 2026)
- GDP rank: 19th (nominal, 2025); 17th (PPP, 2025)
- GDP growth: ▼ -0.8% (2023); ▲1.5% (2024f); ▲4.6% (2025f)
- GDP per capita: ▲$37,811 (nominal; 2026) ▲$78,815 (PPP; 2026)
- GDP per capita rank: 34th (nominal, 2024); 25th (PPP, 2024)
- GDP per capita growth: -2.6% (2024)
- GDP by sector: Agriculture: 2.7%; Industry: 46%; Services: 51.3% (2023 est.)
- Inflation (CPI): 1.6% (2024)
- Gini coefficient: 45.9 high (2013 est.)
- Human Development Index: ▲0.900 very high (2023) (37th)
- Corruption Perceptions Index: ▲59 out of 100 points (2024, 38th rank)
- Labour force: 16.934 million (2023 est.) ▲63.9% employment rate (2023)
- Labour force by occupation: (2005 est.): agriculture: 6.7%; industry: 21.4%; services: 71.9%
- Unemployment: ▼4.88% (2023 est.) (Note: Data are for total population; unemployment among Saudi nationals is more than double)
- Youth unemployment: ▼10.0% (2025)
- Main industries: Crude oil production; petroleum refining; petrochemicals; ammonia; industrial gases; sodium hydroxide; cement; fertilizer; plastics; metals; ship repair; aircraft repair; construction

External
- Exports: ▲$370.974 billion (2023 est.)
- Export goods: Crude petroleum, refined petroleum, polymers, industrial alcohols, natural gas (2019)
- Main export partners: China 21.5%; India 11.6%; Japan 11.6%; United States 5.5% (2022); Turkey 4.5% (2023)
- Imports: $291.565 billion (2023 est.)
- Import goods: Machinery and equipment, chemicals, packaged medicine, motor vehicles, textiles, broadcasting equipment, telephones
- Main import partners: China 21.3%; United Arab Emirates 7.6%; United States 7.3%; India 5.7% (2022); Pakistan 4.7% (2023)
- Current account: ▲$34.07 billion (2023 est.)
- Gross external debt: ▲$205.1 billion (31 December 2017 est.)

Public finance
- Government debt: ▲31.8% of GDP (2025 est.)
- Foreign reserves: ▼$457.949 billion (2023) (7th)
- Budget balance: 8.9% (of GDP) (2017 est.)
- Revenue: 398.023 billion (2022 est.)
- Spending: 315.007 billion (2023 est.)
- All values, unless otherwise stated, are in US dollars.

Saudi Arabia has a high-income developing economy highly reliant on its petroleum sector. Oil and gas account for approximately 22.3% of Saudi GDP and 55% of government revenue, with substantial fluctuations depending on oil prices each year.

The kingdom has the second-largest proven petroleum reserves, and the fourth-largest measured natural gas reserves. Saudi Arabia is currently the largest exporter of petroleum in the world. Other major parts of the economy include refining and chemical manufacturing from the oil reserves, much of which is vertically integrated in the state-owned enterprise, Saudi Aramco. Saudi Arabia is a founding member of the OPEC cartel.

In 2016, the Saudi government launched its Saudi Vision 2030 program to reduce its dependency on oil and diversify its economic resources. By 2022, Saudi Arabia had only modestly reduced its dependence on oil. Monetary policy in Saudi Arabia is anchored by the fixed exchange rate of the Saudi riyal to the U.S. dollar. Nearly every major business in Saudi Arabia has extensive ties to the Saudi State.

== Economic overview ==
Saudi oil reserves are the second largest in the world (after Venezuelan oil reserves), and Saudi Arabia is the world's leading oil exporter and second-largest oil producer. Proven reserves, according to figures provided by the Saudi government, are estimated to be 260 billion barrels (41 km^{3}), which is about one-quarter of the world oil reserves. Petroleum in Saudi Arabia is not only plentiful but also located under pressure close to the earth's surface, which makes it less expensive and more profitable to extract compared to other places. The petroleum sector accounts for roughly 87% of Saudi budget revenues, 90% of export earnings, and 42% of GDP. Saudi Arabia's oil reserves and production are largely managed by the state-owned corporation Saudi Aramco.

Another 40% of the GDP comes from the private sector. An estimated 7.5 (2013) million foreigners work legally in Saudi Arabia and play a crucial role in developing the Saudi economy, for example in the oil and service sectors. The government has been encouraging the growth of the private sector for many years to decrease the kingdom's dependence on oil and to increase employment opportunities for the swelling Saudi population. In recent decades, the government started allowing private sector activity and foreign investor participation in certain sectors, such as power generation and telecommunications, and acceded to the World Trade Organization. During much of the 2000s, high oil prices allowed the government to post budget surpluses and boost spending on job training and education, infrastructure development, and government salaries.

With its absolute monarchy, large state sector, and supply of welfare benefits, the Saudi economy has been described asː

A bewildering (at least to outsiders) combination of a feudal fealty system and a more modern political patronage one. At every level in every sphere of activity, Saudis maneuver through life manipulating individual privileges, favours, obligations, and connections. By the same token, the government bureaucracy is a maze of overlapping or conflicting power centers under the patronage of various royal princes with their own priorities and agendas to pursue and dependents to satisfy.

The following table shows the main economic indicators in 1980–2025 (with IMF staff forecasts in 2026–2031). Inflation under 5% is in green.

Year	GDP (in billion Int$ PPP)	GDP per capita (in Int$ PPP)	GDP (in billion US$ nominal)	GDP per capita (in US$ nominal)	GDP growth (real)	Inflation rate (in percent)	Unemployment (in percent)	Gov. debt (in % of GDP)
1980	319.0	37,890.4	164.5	19,543.4	▲5.8%	▲4.4%	n/a	n/a
1981	▲359.6	▲40,676.7	▲184.3	▲20,846.2	▲3.0%	▲3.6%	n/a	n/a
1982	▼320.3	▼34,505.8	▼153.2	▼16,507.7	▼-16.1%	▲1.9%	n/a	n/a
1983	▼296.3	▼30,394.0	▼129.2	▼13,252.6	▼-11.0%	▲0.6%	n/a	n/a
1984	▼294.7	▼28,788.3	▼119.6	▼11,688.0	▼-4.0%	▼-0.7%	n/a	n/a
1985	▼282.1	▼26,243.4	▼103.9	▼9,666.7	▼-7.2%	▼-2.3%	n/a	n/a
1986	▲290.6	▼25,752.9	▼86.9	▼7,698.9	▲1.0%	▼-3.1%	n/a	n/a
1987	▼288.5	▼24,345.8	▼85.6	▼7,221.9	▼-3.1%	▼-2.4%	n/a	n/a
1988	▲318.4	▲25,587.4	▲88.1	▼7,083.2	▲6.6%	▼-0.4%	n/a	n/a
1989	▲332.3	▼25,428.6	▲95.2	▲7,287.4	▲0.4%	▲1.2%	n/a	n/a
1990	▲377.2	▲27,491.1	▲117.5	▲8,562.3	▲9.4%	▼-1.1%	n/a	n/a
1991	▲422.0	▲29,219.5	▲132.0	▲9,143.2	▲8.2%	▲3.9%	n/a	39.4%
1992	▲451.4	▲30,473.0	▲136.9	▲9,242.7	▲4.6%	▼-1.0%	n/a	▲47.8%
1993	▲463.8	▲30,530.9	▼132.8	▼8,740.7	▲0.4%	▲1.2%	n/a	▲58.6%
1994	▲478.2	▲30,693.0	▲135.0	▼8,663.7	▲1.0%	▲1.4%	n/a	▲67.9%
1995	▲489.8	▼30,648.3	▲143.2	▲8,957.5	▲0.3%	▲5.1%	n/a	▲74.2%
1996	▲515.2	▲31,434.8	▲158.5	▲9,666.9	▲3.3%	▲0.3%	n/a	▲75.2%
1997	▲538.0	▲32,002.8	▲165.7	▲9,859.0	▲2.6%	▼-0.2%	n/a	▲76.7%
1998	▲559.3	▲32,438.1	▼146.8	▼8,512.5	▲2.8%	▼-0.4%	n/a	▲101.5%
1999	▲563.6	▼31,871.5	▲161.7	▲9,144.6	▼-0.6%	▼-2.1%	4.3%	▲103.0%
2000	▲603.6	▲33,278.0	▲189.5	▲10,448.6	▲4.7%	▼-1.0%	▲4.6%	▼86.7%
2001	▲619.3	▲33,290.9	▼184.1	▼9,898.3	▲0.3%	▼-1.1%	4.6%	▲93.1%
2002	▲624.6	▼32,736.2	▲189.6	▲9,937.4	▼-0.7%	▲0.1%	▲5.3%	▲96.4%
2003	▲692.8	▲35,401.9	▲215.8	▲11,027.9	▲8.8%	▲0.5%	▲5.6%	▼81.6%
2004	▲772.8	▲38,504.3	▲258.7	▲12,891.3	▲8.6%	▲0.3%	▲5.8%	▼62.9%
2005	▲844.4	▲41,020.7	▲328.2	▲15,943.4	▲5.9%	▲0.6%	▲6.1%	▼37.3%
2006	▲899.3	▲42,594.7	▲376.4	▲17,827.4	▲3.3%	▲1.9%	▲6.3%	▼25.8%
2007	▲944.1	▲43,599.2	▲415.7	▲19,196.1	▲2.2%	▲5.0%	▼5.6%	▼17.1%
2008	▲1,022.4	▲46,030.9	▲519.8	▲23,403.7	▲6.2%	▲6.1%	▼5.2%	▼12.1%
2009	▼1,017.7	▼44,675.2	▼429.1	▼18,837.0	▼-1.1%	▲4.3%	▲5.4%	▲14.0%
2010	▲1,082.0	▲45,122.2	▲528.2	▲22,028.4	▲5.0%	▲3.7%	▲5.5%	▼8.4%
2011	▲1,234.1	▲49,184.7	▲680.7	▲27,126.8	▲11.8%	▲3.7%	▲5.8%	▼5.3%
2012	▲1,329.5	▲50,806.3	▲751.9	▲28,733.4	▲5.8%	▲2.9%	▼5.5%	▼3.0%
2013	▲1,392.0	▼50,391.1	▲769.8	▼27,865.5	▲2.9%	▲3.1%	▲5.6%	▼2.1%
2014	▲1,473.2	▲52,041.1	▲787.2	▼27,805.5	▲4.0%	▲1.8%	▲5.7%	▼1.5%
2015	▲1,556.1	▲52,190.7	▼693.4	▼23,256.2	▲4.7%	▲1.2%	▼5.6%	▲5.5%
2016	▲1,597.7	▼51,614.8	▼689.3	▼22,267.7	▲1.7%	▲2.9%	5.6%	▲12.2%
2017	▲1,645.5	▲53,120.4	▲741.3	▲23,929.3	▲1.2%	▼-0.9%	▲5.9%	▲15.9%
2018	▲1,793.0	▲59,377.7	▲886.6	▲29,360.0	▲3.2%	▲2.5%	▲6.0%	▲16.8%
2019	▼1,790.6	▲59,560.1	▲888.9	▲29,566.7	▲1.7%	▼-2.0%	▼5.6%	▲20.3%
2020	▼1,498.1	▼47,478.4	▼767.3	▼24,318.3	▼-3.8%	▲3.2%	▲7.7%	▲29.7%
2021	▲1,929.9	▲62,690.5	▲982.7	▲31,920.8	▲6.5%	▲3.1%	▼6.1%	▼25.5%
2022	▲2,315.8	▲71,976.0	▲1,239.1	▲38,510.2	▲12.0%	▲2.5%	▼4.9%	▼21.3%
2023	▲2,415.7	▼71,676.9	▼1,218.6	▼36,156.8	▲0.5%	▲2.5%	▼4.0%	▲23.0%
2024	▲2,543.2	▲72,045.1	▲1,254.1	▼35,527.8	▲2.6%	▲1.5%	▼3.5%	▲25.9%
2025	▲2,730.1	▲75,822.5	▲1,273.6	▼35,370.4	▲4.6%	▲2.0%	▼3.2%	▲31.8%
2026f	▼2,728.6	▼74,294.9	▲1,343.3	▲36,577.1	▼-3.3%	▲1.9%	n/a	▲35.4%
2027f	▲3,037.7	▲81,089.4	▲1,427.7	▲38,111.4	▲7.9%	▲2.2%	n/a	▲37.3%
2028f	▲3,249.8	▲85,051.0	▲1,475.6	▲38,617.9	▲4.8%	▲2.0%	n/a	▲40.2%
2029f	▲3,424.7	▲87,871.0	▲1,533.7	▲39,351.5	▲3.4%	▲2.0%	n/a	▲43.1%
2030f	▲3,610.8	▲90,828.1	▲1,601.1	▲40,276.0	▲3.5%	▲2.0%	n/a	▲45.9%
2031f	▲3,805.9	▲93,859.5	▲1,675.5	▲41,319.7	▲3.6%	▲2.0%	n/a	▲48.7%

== History ==
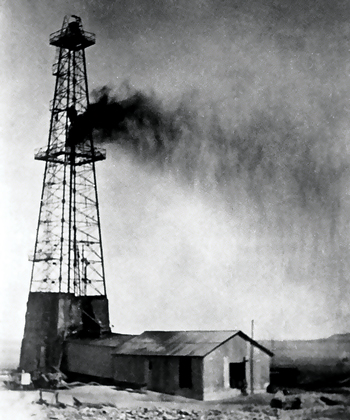
Dammam No. 7 on March 4, 1938, the day the well struck oil in commercial quantities, becoming the first in the kingdom to do so

=== Oil, petroleum and gas ===
Saudi Arabia was a subsistence economy until the 1930s. In 1933, the Saudi government signed an oil concession agreement with the Standard Oil Company of California; five years later, commercial volumes of oil were discovered in the kingdom. The development of oil fields continued in Saudi Arabia, managed mainly by Arabian American Oil Company (Aramco), a company formed by the partnership of Texaco and Chevron. In 1951, the first offshore field in the Middle East was established by Aramco at Raʾs Al-Saffāniyyah area. By 1949, Saudi oil production reached 500,000 barrels per day (bpd) and rose rapidly to 1 million bpd in 1954. Moreover, in 1951, Aramco started operating the Trans-Arabian Pipeline that moved oil from the eastern region of Saudi Arabia to the Mediterranean Sea through Jordan, Syria, and Lebanon. However, in 1981, this line was no longer used after a new line began operations that linked Jubail on the Persian Gulf and Yanbu on the Red Sea. The new pipe contributed greatly to speed up oil transport.

In 1960, OPEC was established, with Saudi Arabia as one of its founding members. During the 1973 oil crisis, the price of oil rose from $3 per barrel to nearly $12, and the Saudi economy started growing rapidly, with GDP increasing from approximately $15 billion in 1973 to almost $184 billion by 1981. After gradually purchasing Aramco assets, the Saudi government nationalized the company in 1980. In 1988, Saudi Aramco was established to take over the responsibilities of Aramco.

In 1980, the price of oil peaked, and demand started decreasing as a result of recessions in industrialized nations and more efficient oil use, which produced surpluses. This created a worldwide oil glut, with the price of oil dropping from approximately $36 per barrel in 1980 to approximately $14 by 1986. Saudi oil production, which had increased to almost 10 million barrels (1,600,000 m^{3}) per day during 1980–81, fell 80% to about 2 million barrels per day (320,000 m^{3}/d) in 1985. Budgetary deficits developed, and the government drew down its foreign assets. As a result of the oil glut and the pressure from declines in production, after 1985 Saudi Arabia started enforcing production quotas more harshly for the OPEC members.

In June 1993, Saudi Aramco absorbed the state marketing and refining company (SAMAREC), becoming the world's largest fully integrated oil company. Most Saudi oil is exported by tankers from oil terminals at Ras Tanura and Ju'aymah in the Persian Gulf.

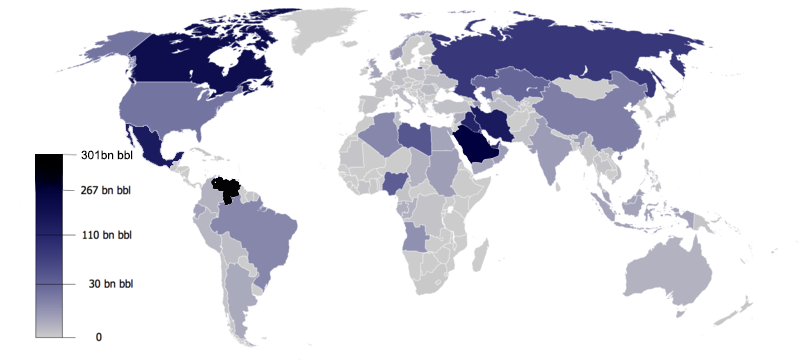
A map of world oil reserves according to OPEC, 2013

In the 1990s, Saudi Arabia experienced a significant contraction of oil revenues combined with a high rate of population growth. Per capita income fell from a high of $11,700 at the height of the oil boom in 1981 to $6,300 in 1998. Taking into account the impact of the real oil price changes on the kingdom's real gross domestic income, the real command-basis GDP was computed to be 330.381 billion 1999 USD in 2010. Increases in oil prices in the early 2000s helped boost per capita GDP to $17000 in 2007 dollars (about $7,400 adjusted for inflation), but have declined since oil price drop in mid-2014.

However, beginning in late 1997, Saudi Arabia again faced the challenge of low oil prices. Because of a combination of factors—the East Asian economic crises, a warm winter in the West caused by El Niño, and an increase in non-OPEC oil production—demand for oil decreased and pulled oil prices down by more than one-third.

Saudi Arabia was a key player in coordinating the successful 1999 campaign of OPEC and other oil-producing countries to raise the oil price to its highest level since the (Persian) Gulf War by managing petroleum supply and production. That same year, Saudi Arabia established the Supreme Economic Council to formulate and better coordinate economic development policies to accelerate institutional and industrial reforms.

Saudi Arabia joined the World Trade Organization (WTO) in 2005 after many years of negotiations.

=== Foreign investment ===
Before 2000, there were strict limits placed on foreign direct investment in Saudi Arabia. The 1979 Foreign Investment Act prohibited foreign ownership in some sectors of the economy, allowed foreign investment only if the investor qualified for a license based on their expertise, and gave priority to businesses that were Saudi-owned or partially Saudi-owned.

However, in the mid-1990s, foreign ownership rules were relaxed, with investment sought in telecommunications, utilities, and financial services. The 2000 Foreign Direct Investment Act made substantial changes to the rules on foreign investment, including allowing projects to be run by 100% foreign-owned companies for the first time.

According to UNCTAD's June 2018 report, Saudi Arabia's foreign direct investment was only $1.4 billion in 2017, down from $7.5 billion the year before and as much as $12.2 billion in 2012. The fall in investment is attributed to negative intra-company loans by foreign multinationals and various divestments. In the first quarter of 2018, net capital outflows were running at approximately 5% of GDP, compared to less than 2% of GDP in late 2016. However, according to a report published in Trading Economics, in the second quarter of 2018, foreign direct investment in the country raised by $882 million. Moreover, SAGIA's data indicate that licenses provided to foreign investment increased by 130% in the first quarter of 2018 as a result of reforms in the economy.

As Saudi oil income declined in the late 2010s, the kingdom's international debt soared. In December 2018, Saudi Arabia announced it would be issuing bonds worth approximately 120 billion riyals ($32 billion) to cover its 4.2% GDP deficit of 131 billion riyals. In January 2019, the kingdom sold bonds worth $7.5 billion. In almost two and a half years, bonds worth $60 billion were sold by Saudi, which became one of the biggest borrowers globally.

In September 2018, the Public Investment Fund completed a deal with a group of global lenders for a loan of $11 billion. The deal raised more than initially planned and was the first time the PIF had incorporated loans and debt instruments into its funding. According to data from Fitch Ratings, over two years starting from May 2016 Saudi Arabia went from having zero debt to raising $68 billion in dollar-denominated bonds and syndicated loans—one of the fastest rates among emerging economies.

Foreign investments in the kingdom witnessed a rapid increase in the first quarter of 2019. The number of new licenses approved for foreign businesses grew 70% over 2018. Most licenses were approved for British and Chinese companies, which drove the increase. In the first quarter of 2019, foreign investment in Saudi Arabia jumped by 28%.

Borrowing continued, and in 2026 during the 2026 Iran war, planned 2026 borrowing program was $58 billion, with the finance ministry expecting public debt to reach 33.9% of gross domestic product.

=== Diversification and the development plans ===
All the Saudi government's five-year plan since 1970 have called for diversifying the economy beyond oil, but with marginal success.

The government has sought to allocate its petroleum income to transform its relatively undeveloped, oil-based economy into a modern industrial state, while maintaining the kingdom's traditional Islamic values and customs. Although economic planners have not achieved all their goals, the economy has progressed rapidly. Oil wealth has increased the standard of living of most Saudis. However, significant population growth has strained the government's ability to finance further improvements in the country's standard of living. Heavy dependence on petroleum revenue continues, but industry and agriculture now account for a larger share of economic activity. The mismatch between the job skills of Saudi graduates and the needs of the private job market at all levels remains the principal obstacle to economic diversification and development; about 4.6 million non-Saudis are employed in the economy.

Saudi Arabia first began to diversify its economy to reduce dependency on oil in the 1970s as part of its first five-year development plan. Basic petrochemical industries using petroleum byproducts as feedstock were developed. The fishing villages of al-Jubail on the Persian Gulf and Yanbu on the Red Sea were developed. However, their effect on Saudi Arabia's economic fortunes has been small.

Saudi Arabia's first two development plans, covering the 1970s, emphasized infrastructure. The results were impressive—the total length of paved highways tripled, power generation increased by a factor of 28, and the capacity of the seaports grew by a factor of 10. For the third plan (1980–85), the emphasis changed. Spending on infrastructure declined, shifting instead to education, health, and social services. The share for diversifying and expanding productive sectors of the economy (primary industry) did not rise as planned, but the two industrial cities of Jubail and Yanbu—which were built around the use of the country's oil and gas to produce steel, petrochemicals, fertilizer, and refined oil products—were largely completed.

In the fourth plan (1985–90), the country's basic infrastructure was viewed as largely complete, but education and training remained areas of concern. Private enterprise was encouraged, and foreign investment in the form of joint ventures with Saudi public and private companies was welcomed. The private sector became more important, rising to 70% of non-oil GDP by 1987. While still concentrated in trade and commerce, private investment increased in industry, agriculture, banking, and construction companies. These private investments were supported by generous government financing and incentive programs. The objective was for the private sector to have 70% to 90% ownership in most joint venture enterprises.

The fifth plan (1990–95) emphasized consolidation of the country's defences; improved and more efficient government social services; regional development; and, most importantly, creating greater private-sector employment opportunities for Saudis by reducing the number of foreign workers.

The sixth plan (1996–2000) focused on lowering the cost of government services without cutting them and sought to expand educational training programs. The plan called for reducing the kingdom's dependence on the petroleum sector by diversifying economic activity, particularly in the private sector, with special emphasis on industry and agriculture. It also continued the effort to "Saudize" the labour force.

The seventh plan (2000–2004) focused more on economic diversification and a greater role of the private sector in the Saudi economy. For 2000–04, the government aimed at an average GDP growth rate of 3.16% each year, with projected growths of 5.04% for the private sector and 4.01% for the non-oil sector. The government also set a target of creating 817,300 new jobs for Saudi nationals. By 2007, advertising expenditures had reached new peaks due to emphasis on value-added manufacturing.

In 2016, the main investing countries in Saudi Arabia were the US, UAE, France, Singapore, Kuwait, and Malaysia. They mainly invested in chemical industry, real estate, tourism, fossil fuels, automobiles, and machinery. As part of its diversification, Saudi Arabia arranged major refinery contracts with Chinese and other companies.

After Saudi Arabia became a member of the World Trade Organization (WTO) in 2005, the overall foreign investment environment in Saudi Arabia improved thanks to the kingdom's stable economy, massive oil reserves, high power of expenditure, developed infrastructure, reinforced finance, and banking system. Since then, and pursuant to its commitment to the WTO, Saudi Arabia has been developing trade-related policies and legislations. Moreover, foreign investment has been highly encouraged by Saudi Vision 2030 and its economic diversification.

Since 2017, to boost the economy and decrease the country's dependency on oil, Crown Prince Mohammed bin Salman has introduced multiple changes, such as raising the prices of gasoline and electricity, levying new taxes, and prioritizing Saudi workers over foreign workers. However, some government officials claimed the policies were causing serious ill effects on the economy. Saudi businessmen reported a decline in sales for 2018, and a few blamed the government.

In 2019, the Financial Times reported that the plans to float state-owned oil beneficiary Saudi Aramco were stranded between the company's attachment to the oil ministry and the desire to meet international standards. However, Energy Minister Khalid Al Falih has long maintained that Aramco's association with the state is a "win-win policy" for both parties.

Saudi Arabia made plans to launch six "economic cities" (e.g., King Abdullah Economic City) in an effort to diversify the economy and provide jobs. At a total construction cost of $60 billion (2013), they were "expected to contribute $150bn to the economy". However, these cities have failed to attract either the population or the financial investment that the government claimed they would.

The privatization program Saudi Vision 2030 is running behind schedule. Oil prices have doubled since the government began to consider the program in 2015. Delay in Aramco's initial public offering further demonstrated a lack of urgency to privatize, even though in July 2018, the International Monetary Fund urged accelerating the process.

According to many reports, the Saudi government is interested in granting more liberties to the foreign investment system and giving a 100% allowance to foreign investors to work in the wholesale and retail sector in certain cases. The Saudi Ministry of Commerce and Investment expected that the kingdom would see an increase in the GDP per capita from US$20,700 to $33,500 by 2020. The GDP per capita reached $40,000 by 2022.

== Regional GDP ==
Data are for the year 2022. Data calculated by dividing total GDP with provided percentage.

Ranking	Province	GDP (billion US$)	Percentage of total GDP
1	Eastern	249.334	22.5%
2	Riyadh	243.793	22%
3	Mecca	177.304	16%
4	Rest of provinces	437.719	39.5%
5	Saudi Arabia	1,108.149	100%

== Employment ==
As of 2008, roughly two-thirds of workers employed in Saudi Arabia were foreigners, and in the private sector the proportion was approximately 90%. In January 2014, the Saudi government claimed it had lowered the 90% rate, doubling the number of Saudi citizens working in the private sector to 1.5 million (compared to 10 million foreign expatriates working in the kingdom).

According to Reuters, economists "estimate only 30–40 percent of working-age Saudis hold jobs or actively seek work", although the official unemployment rate is only around 12 percent. Most Saudis with jobs are employed by the government, but the International Monetary Fund has warned that the government cannot support such a large payroll in the long term. The government has announced a succession of plans since 2000 to deal with the imbalance by "Saudization" of the economy, but the foreign workforce and unemployment has continued to grow. Since the beginning of 2017, however, Saudi Arabia has seen record numbers of foreign workers leaving the country as the Saudi government imposed higher fees on expatriate workers, with more than 677,000 foreigners leaving the kingdom. This has done little to lower the unemployment rate, which rose to 12.9 percent, the highest on record.

Each year, about a quarter-million young Saudis enter the job market. With the first phase of Saudization into effect, 70% of sales jobs are expected to be filled by Saudis. However, the private sector still remains hugely dominated by foreigners. The rate of local unemployment is 12.9%, its highest in more than a decade. According to a report published by Bloomberg Economics in 2018, the government needs to produce 700000 jobs by 2020 to meet its 9% unemployment target.

One obstacle is social resistance to certain types of employment. Jobs in service and sales are considered totally unacceptable for citizens of Saudi Arabia—both to potential employees and customers.

On 25 October 2026, King Salman, following a proposal by Crown Prince Mohammed bin Salman, directed a package of support measures for Saudi citizens. The measures included a SAR 500 monthly allowance increase for eligible civilian and military employees, retirees, eligible family members under the Social Insurance system, and families receiving Social Security benefits. They also included higher wage thresholds for Saudi employees to be counted fully under the Nitaqat Saudization program.

== Energy ==
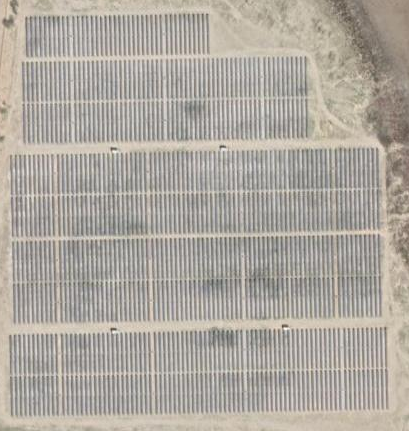
A solar station in Khafji

Renewable energy in Saudi Arabia is a growing sector and a key pillar of the country's economic diversification strategy under the Saudi Vision 2030. Historically reliant on fossil fuels, Saudi Arabia is leveraging its abundant solar and wind resources to transition towards a more sustainable energy mix, aiming to generate 50% of its electricity from renewables by 2030. As of 2023, Saudi Arabia's renewable energy production capacity had more than tripled to over 2.2 GW from 700 MW the previous year, with over 21 GW of projects under development.

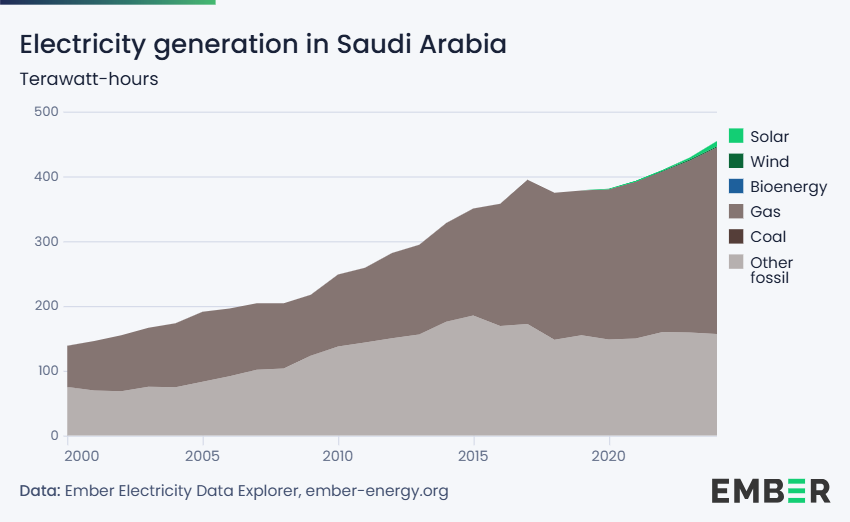
Electricity generation in Saudi Arabia in terawatt-hours

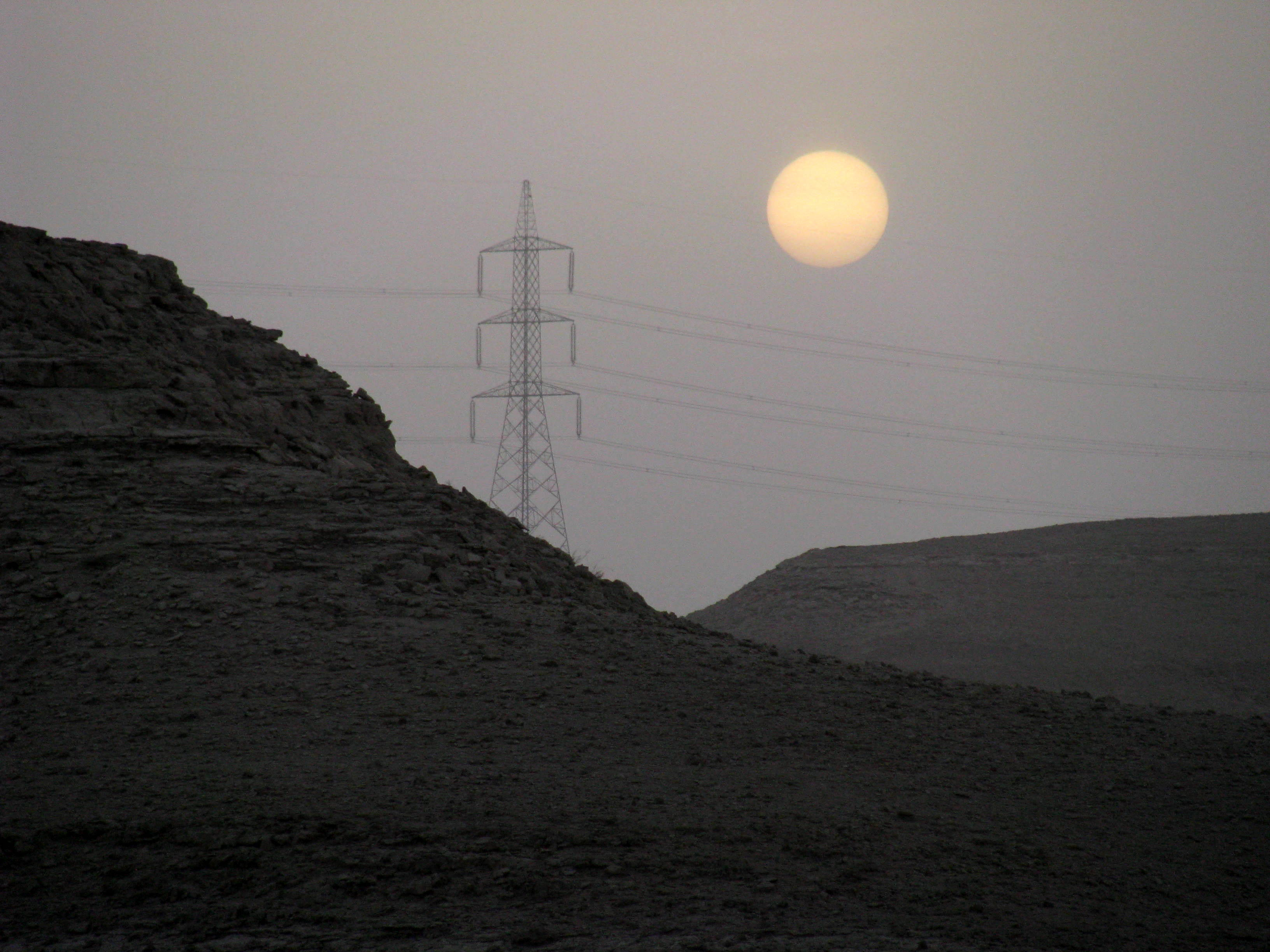
Power line in the desert near Riyadh

Saudi Arabia is the fastest growing electricity consumer in the Middle East, particularly of transportation fuels. In 2005, Saudi Arabia was the world's 15th largest consumer of primary energy, of which over 60 percent was petroleum-based. The remainder was made up of natural gas.

Two ministries share responsibility for the energy sector: the Ministry of Oil and the Ministry of Water and Electricity. The Ministry of Water was created in 2001 by merging water related sub-departments. Its stated purpose is "to prepare a comprehensive plan to establish water and sewage networks all over the Kingdom. It will also develop the country's water policies and propose new regulations to preserve water." In 2003, this department was expanded.

Saudi Arabia is enhancing its electrical power sector infrastructure to accommodate the rising demand from both the residential and commercial sectors, simultaneously advancing its strategy for energy diversification away from traditional oil and gas reliance. The kingdom aims to increase its electricity generation capacity from 83 gigawatts (GW) in 2023 to 110 GW by 2028, supported by a $293 billion investment in both conventional power and renewable energy projects. At the heart of this strategy is Saudi Arabia's goal to generate 50% of its electricity from renewable sources by 2030.

== Non-petroleum resources sector ==
Saudi Arabia has natural resources other than oil, including small mineral deposits of gold, silver, iron, copper, zinc, manganese, tungsten, lead, sulfur, phosphate, soapstone, and feldspar. The state-owned mining company Maaden controlled the mining sector.

== Agriculture ==
The country has a small agricultural sector, primarily in the southwest where annual rainfall averages 400 mm (16 in). The country is one of the world's largest producers of dates. Prior to 2009, wheat was grown using desalinated water for irrigation, but was phased out by 2016 due to costly water usage. As of 2009, the livestock population amounted to 7.4 million sheep, 4.2 million goats, half a million camels, and a quarter of a million cattle.

In 2008, the "Initiative for Saudi Agricultural Investment Abroad" was launched, leading to extensive billion-dollar purchases of large tracts of land around the world, including in Ethiopia, Indonesia, Mali, Senegal, and Sudan. Described as land-grabbing by critics, in various instances these purchases have also led to uproars in the respective countries. Competing industrializing nations with food security problems seeking agricultural land include China, South Korea, and India, as well as the Persian Gulf States of Kuwait, Qatar, and the UAE.

== Informal economy ==
Although the jobs created by the roughly two million annual Hajj pilgrims do not last long, they employ more people than the oil industry—40,000 temporary jobs (butchers, barbers, coach drivers, etc.)—and generates US$2–3 billion in revenue.

== Industrial manufacturing ==
=== Automotive ===
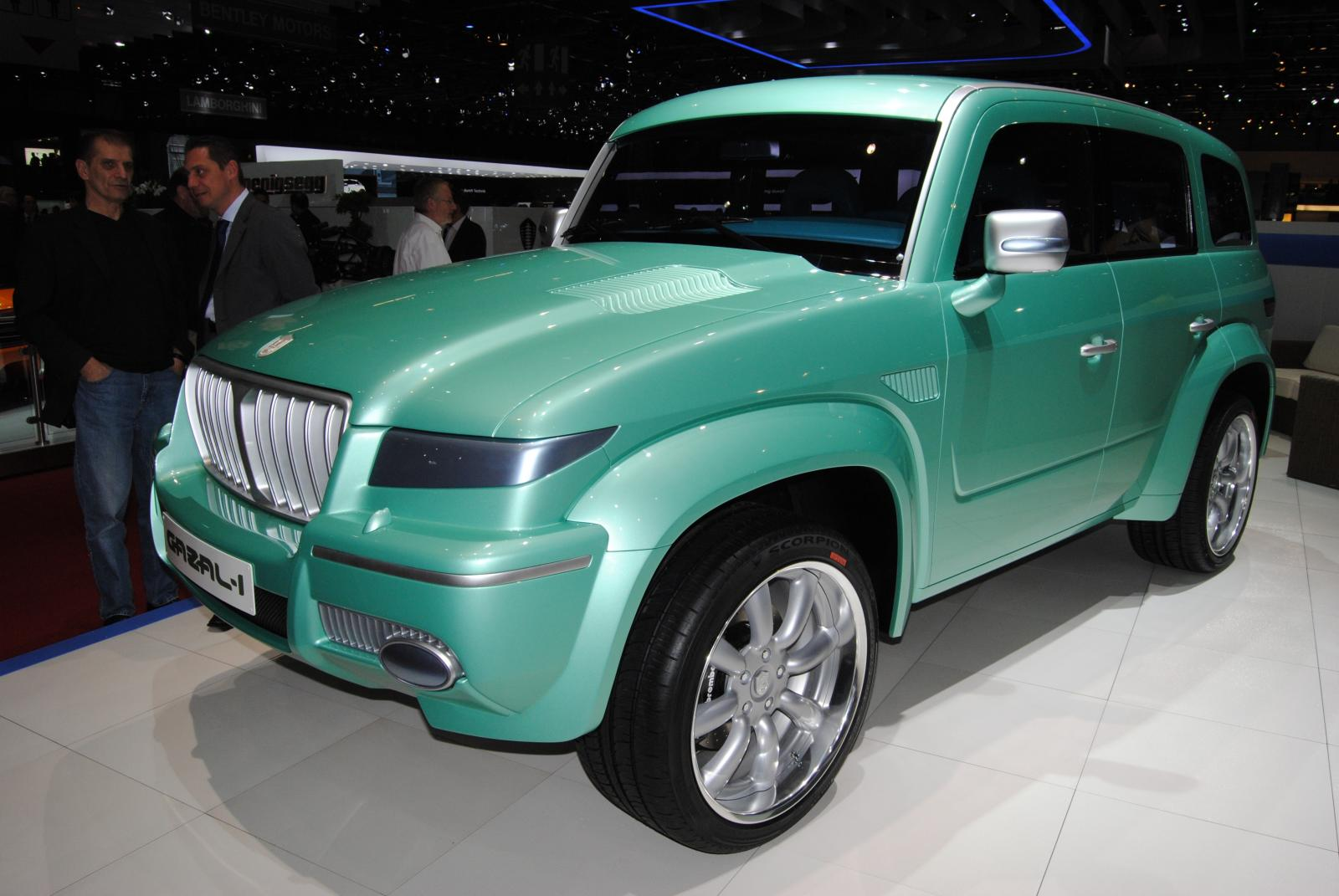
KSU Gazal-1

In 2010, the KSU Gazal-1, an SUV built by students at King Saud University, became the first mass-produced vehicle manufactured domestically in Saudi Arabia. In 2022, the US car company Lucid Motors announced plans to build an electric vehicle manufacturing plant in Jeddah. Construction began in May 2022, and the plant will have capacity for 150,000 vehicles.

Toyota is the leading brand in Saudi Arabia, accounting for 30% of car sales in the country; they are followed by Kia and Hyundai who together make up 26%, and Renault/Nissan/Mitsubishi at 9%. The American Big Three auto makers (Ford, GM, and Chrysler) comprise the remainder. As for the quantity of vehicle units sold, in the first half of 2023, Toyota had the highest in the country with 112,584 and the second-most was the Hyundai badge with 47,218.

== Education ==
According to The Economist, the Saudi government has attempted in past years to raise employment by forcing "companies to fill at least 30% of their positions" with Saudi citizens. However, "employers complained bitterly about the lack of skills among young locals; years of rote-learning and religious instruction fail to prepare them for the job market." However, many argue that young Saudis couldn't compete with foreigners due to the low compensation and salaries most companies had used to offer for employees from Asian, Indian subcontinent, and other Arab poor countries, which this cheap labor happily accepts; in addition to the bad work conditions, culture, and environment present in most of the Saudi private sector, largely due to the fact that it was initially modeled to accommodate very-low-income employees from other nations, not the Saudi medium-income and somewhat highly educated population. As a consequence, "the quota has now been dropped and replaced with a more flexible system".

According to scholar David Commins, the kingdom depends "on huge numbers of expatriate workers to fill technical and administrative positions" in part because of an educational system that, despite "generous budgets", has suffered from "poorly trained teachers, low retention rates, lack of rigorous standards, weak scientific and technical instruction and excessive attention to religious subjects".

A 2015 survey conducted by Bayt.com showed that over a quarter (28%) of professionals in North Africa and the Middle East believe that there is a skills shortage in their country of residence. This belief was even more prominent among respondents in Saudi Arabia (39%).

== Healthcare ==
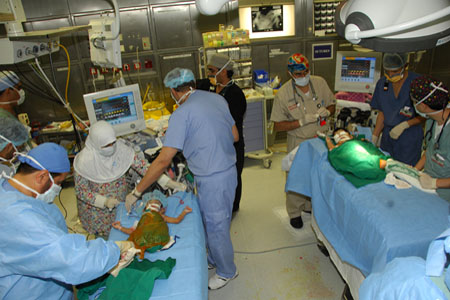
Saudi twins receiving care from doctors at King Abdulaziz Medical City in Riyadh

Health care in Saudi Arabia is a national health care system in which the government provides free universal healthcare coverage through a number of government agencies. There is also a growing role and increased participation from the private sector in the provision of health care services.

== Housing ==
50% of Saudi Arabia's citizens owned their own home in 2017, a rise from 30% in 2011 but below the international average rate of 70%. In 2011, analysts estimated 500,000 new homes per year were needed to match the growth in Saudi population, but as of early 2014 only 300,000 to 400,000 houses per year were being built.

One problem is that the government Real Estate Development Fund (REDF)—which provides 81% of all loans for housing—had an 18-year waiting list for loans due to pent-up demand. Another is that the REDF's maximum loan is 500,000 SR ($133,000), while in 2012 the average price for a small free-standing home in Riyadh is more than double that—1.23 million SR ($328,000). However, as part of the economic reforms undertaken by the government to enhance national living standards, new funding solutions have been established to boost the mortgages for existing and new borrowers to help finance their housing plans. This was announced in August 2018 by the Minister of Housing, Mr. Majed Al-Hogail.

A major reason for the high cost of housing is the high cost of land. In urban areas, the price of land has been bid up because nearly all of it is owned by the Saudi elite (members of the royal family or other wealthy Saudis), who have lobbied the government for land "giveaways". Landlords have seen prices rocket by 50% from 2011 to 2013. The owners benefit from these price increases as they hold the land for future development. To deal with the key "land banking" issue, the Minister of Housing suggested in 2013 that vacant property within city limits could be subject to a tax. However, no firm plans for any tax have been unveiled.

== Private sector ==
Saudi Arabia's private sector is dominated by a handful of big businesses in the service sector, primarily in construction and real estate, such as Olayan, Zamil, Almarai, Mobily, STC, SABIC, Sadara, Halliburton, Baker Hughes, Flynas, Hilton, Zain, Yanbu Cement, Alhokair, MBC, Mahfouz, Al Rajhi, and Alfanar. These firms are "heavily dependent on government spending", which is dependent on oil revenues.

From 2003 to 2013, "several key services" were privatized—municipal water supply, electricity, telecommunications—and parts of education and health care, traffic control, and car accident reporting were also privatized. According to Arab News columnist Abdel Aziz Aluwaisheg, "in almost every one of these areas, consumers have raised serious concerns about the performance of these privatized entities."

A relatively small sector until a boom in the 1980s, the food service industry in Saudi Arabia today is valued at around $13 billion.

To provide the best support for the private sector and entrepreneurs, the kingdom announced a decision approved by the Saudi Cabinet in July 2019 allowing businesses in the country to be given the option to remain open 24 hours a day. As of 2023, the average monthly salary for Saudis working in the private sector is SR9600, up 45% from SR6600 in the year 2018.

== Tourism ==
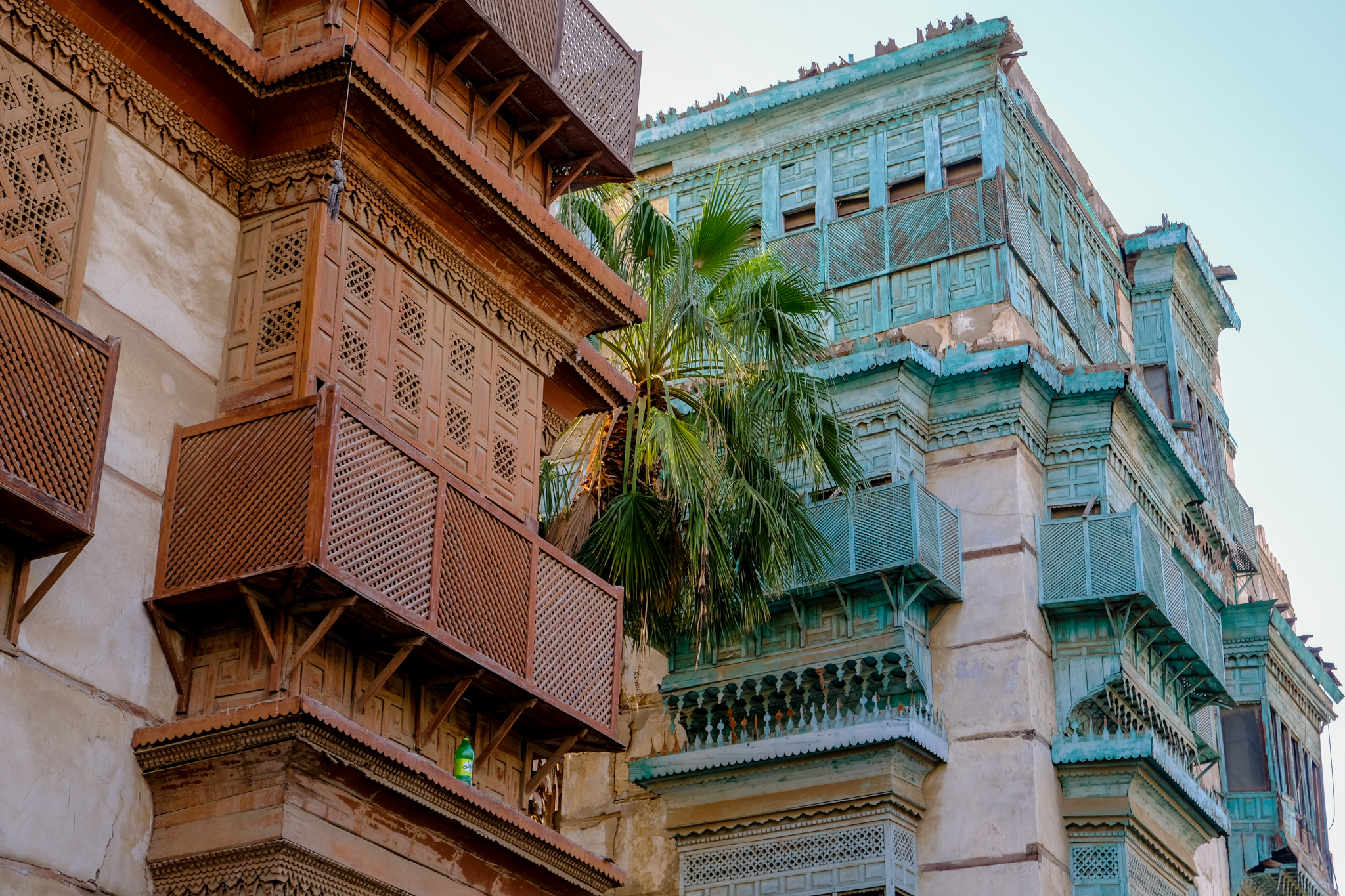
Al-Balad, Jeddah is a UNESCO World Heritage Site

Saudi Arabia is the second biggest tourist destination in the Middle East with over 16 million visiting in 2017. Although most tourism in Saudi Arabia still largely involves religious pilgrimages, there is growth in the leisure tourism sector, having generated $27.5 billion in 2019. Potential tourist areas include the Hijaz and Sarawat Mountains, Red Sea diving, and a number of ancient ruins.

According to the World Travel and Tourism Council (WTTC), in 2018, Travel and tourism in Saudi Arabia added 9% to the Kingdom’s total economy which is worth $65.2 billion.

In December 2013, Saudi Arabia announced its intention to begin issuing tourist visas for the first time in its history. Council of Ministers entrusted the Saudi Commission for Tourism and Antiquities with visa issuing on the basis of certain regulations approved by the Ministries of Interior and Foreign Affairs. On 27 September 2019, Saudi Arabia formally announced the issuance of the tourist visa to visitors from 49 countries for a fee of $80. The visa can be either obtained online (eVisa) or on arrival. Ten days after the implementation of instant tourist visas, 24,000 foreign visitors entered Saudi Arabia. China visitors topped the list, with the UK and the US in second and third.

Popular places to visit in Saudi Arabia are Makkah, Medina, Mada'in Salih, Yanbu, Tabuk, Jeddah and Riyadh.

Arriving in Saudi Arabia can be through 13 international airports served by various global airlines. There are also 15 domestic airports connecting the country regions and cites. For moving within the country, there are budget airlines like Flynas, Fyadeal, Nesma Airlines, in addition to Saudia and, from late 2025 onwards, Riyadh Air.

== Transport ==
Transport in Saudi Arabia is facilitated through a relatively new system of roads, railways and seaways. Most of the network started construction after the discovery of oil in the Eastern Province in 1952, with the notable exception of Highway 40, which was built to connect the capital Riyadh to the economically productive Eastern Province, and later to the Islamic holy city of Mecca and the port city of Jeddah. With the economic growth of the 1970s, of Saudi Arabia has initiated many infrastructure development projects across the country, and the extensive development of the transportation network has followed suit in support of various economic developments.

== Water supply and sanitation ==
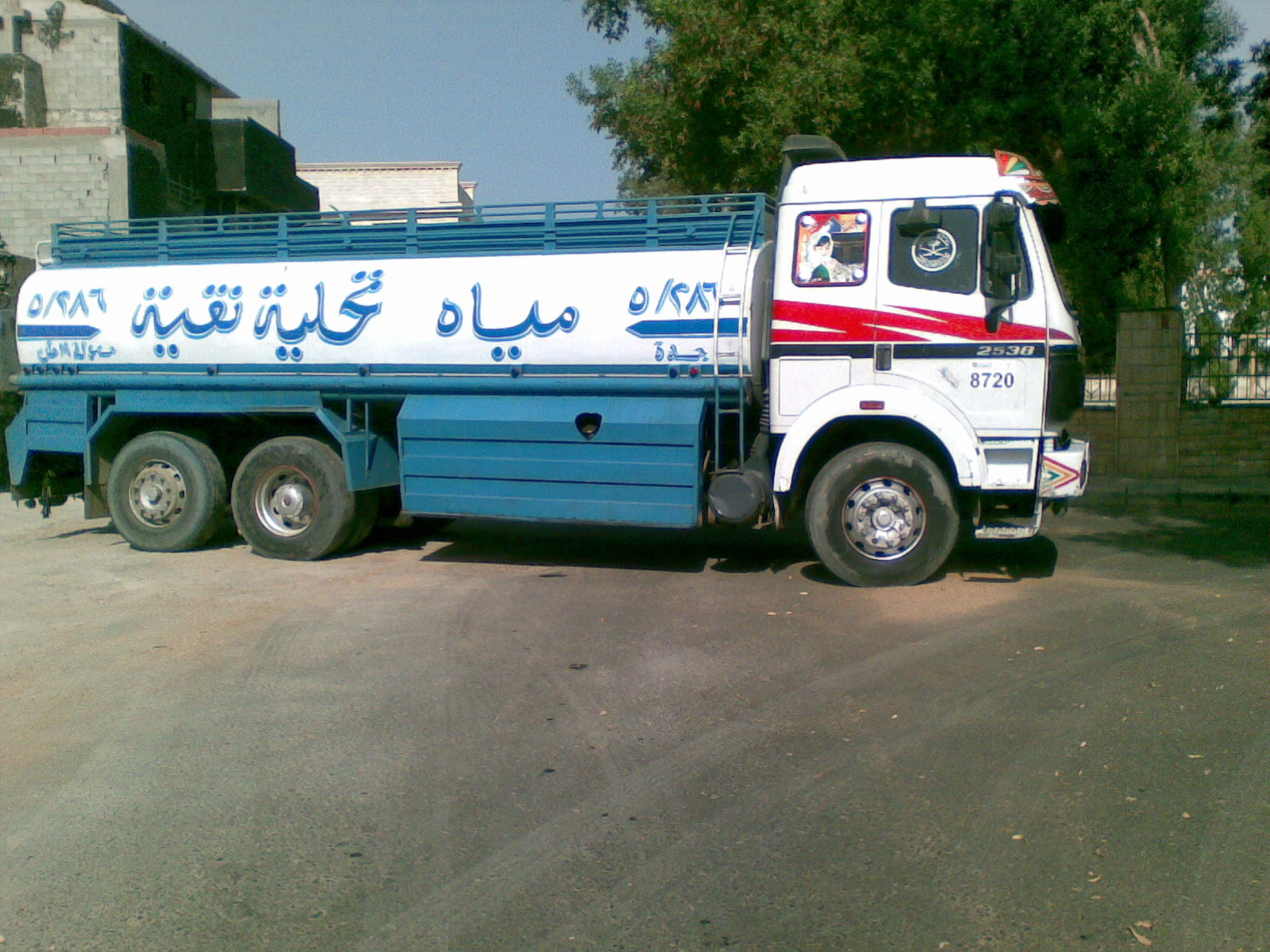
A water service truck in Jeddah

Water supply and sanitation in Saudi Arabia is characterized by challenges and achievements. One of the main challenges is water scarcity. In order to overcome water scarcity, substantial investments have been undertaken in seawater desalination, water distribution, sewerage and wastewater treatment. Today about 50% of drinking water comes from desalination, 40% from the mining of non-renewable groundwater and only 10% from surface water in the mountainous southwest of the country. The capital Riyadh, located in the heart of the country, is supplied with desalinated water pumped from the Persian Gulf over a distance of 467 km. Water is provided almost for free to residential users. Despite improvements, service quality remains poor, for example in terms of continuity of supply. Another challenge is weak institutional capacity and governance, reflecting general characteristics of the public sector in Saudi Arabia. Among the achievements is a significant increases in desalination, and in access to water, the expansion of wastewater treatment, as well as the use of treated effluent for the irrigation of urban green spaces, and for agriculture.

Since 2000, the government has increasingly relied on the private sector to operate water and sanitation infrastructure, beginning with desalination and wastewater treatment plants. Since the creation of the National Water Company (NWC) in 2008, the operation of urban water distribution systems in the four largest cities has gradually been delegated to private companies as well. The apparent paradox of very low water tariffs and water privatization is explained by government subsidies. The government buys desalinated water from private operators at high prices and resells the bulk water for free. Likewise, the government directly pays private operators that run the water distribution and sewer systems of large cities under management contracts. Furthermore, it fully subsidizes investments in water distribution and sewers. Water utilities are expected to recover an increasing share of their costs from the sale of treated effluent to industries. In January 2016 water and sewer tariffs were increased for the first time in more than a decade, which resulted in discontent and in the sacking of the Minister of Water and Energy Abdullah Al-Hussayen in April 2016.

== Trade ==
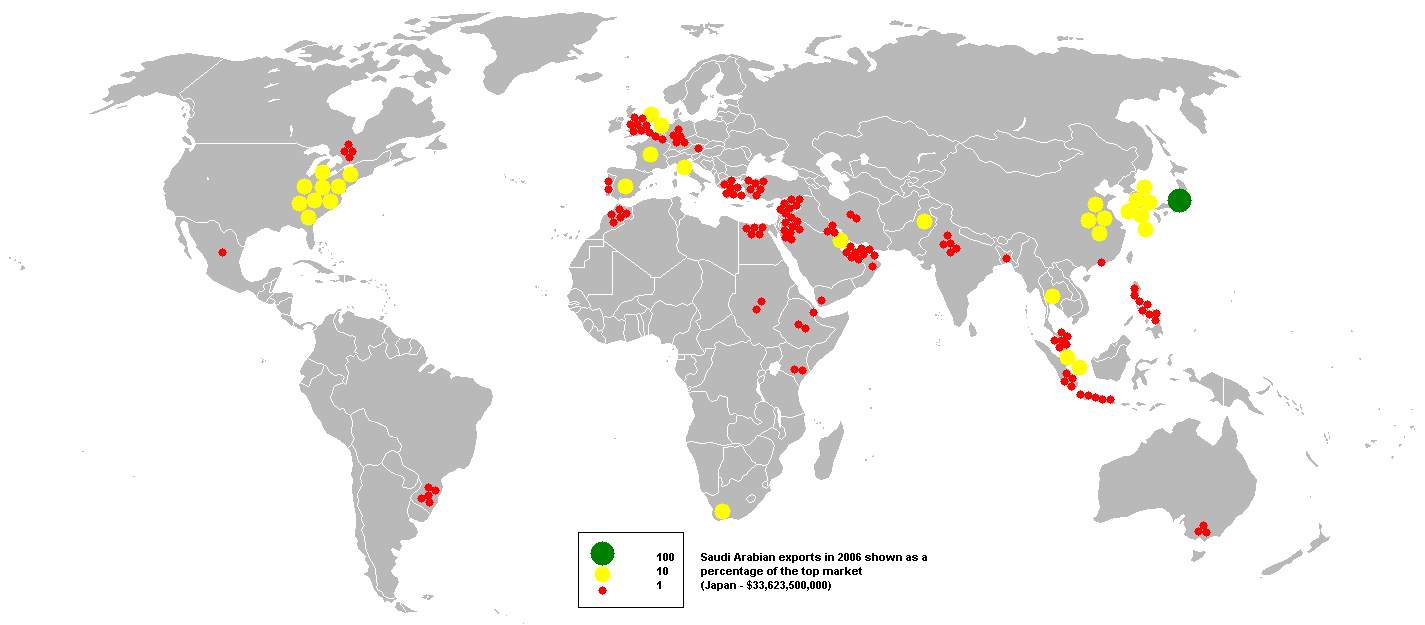
Saudi Arabian exports in 2006

Exports of Saudi Arabia by product category (2019) Chemical products Transportation Machines Mineral products Plastics and rubbers Metals Foodstuffs Precious metals Textiles Instruments Animal products Vegetable products Paper goods Footwear and headwear Miscellaneous Stone and glass Wood products Animal and vegetable bi-products Animal hides Arts and antiques Weapons

In April 2000, the government established the Saudi Arabian General Investment Authority to encourage foreign direct investment in Saudi Arabia. Saudi Arabia maintains a negative list of sectors in which foreign investment is prohibited, but the government planned to open some closed sectors such as telecommunications, insurance, and power transmission/distribution over time.

Saudi Arabia became a full World Trade Organization (WTO) member on 11 December 2005. In 2019, the government established the General Authority for Foreign Trade to enhance the kingdom's international commercial and investment activities.

In early July 2020, Saudi Arabia announced the nomination of its former Minister of Economy and Saudi royal court adviser, Mohammad Al-Tuwaijri, for the role of WTO's director-general. The nominations were made public about a month after the WTO reported the kingdom for copyrights infringement following distribution of pirated sports broadcasting content on the state-owned broadcast service, BeoutQ. The nomination of al-Tuwaijri received criticism from human rights groups in mid-August 2020, demanding the rejection of the Saudi nominee due to the kingdom's violation of human rights in addition to his silence over it. On 7 October 2020, Al-Tuwaijri, along with other nominees from the UK and Kenya, lost the bid for the role due to lack of support, as compared to the nominees from Nigeria and South Korea who qualified for the final round of selection.

Saudi Arabia is part of the following trade organizations:

- World Trade Organization (WTO)
- International Monetary Fund (IMF)
- International Chamber of Commerce (ICC)
- International Organization for Standardization (ISO)
- World Customs Organization (WCO)

== Challenges ==
Among the challenges to the Saudi economy include halting or reversing the decline in per capita income, improving education to prepare youth for the workforce and providing them with employment, diversifying the economy, stimulating the private sector and housing construction, and diminishing corruption and inequality. In answer to the question of why the Saudi economy is so dependent on foreign labor, the UN Arab Human Development Report blamed stunted social and economic development inhibited by lack of personal freedom, poor education, government hiring based on factors other than merit, and the exclusion of women.

=== Income drop ===
Despite possessing the second largest petroleum reserves in the world, per capita income dropped from approximately $18,000 at the height of the oil boom (1981) to $7,000 in 2001, according to one estimate. As of 2013, due to the rapid population growth of Saudi Arabia, per capita income in Saudi was "a fraction of that of smaller Persian gulf neighbors", even less than petroleum-poor Bahrain.

Unlike most developed countries, where GDP growth is a function of increases in productivity and inputs such as employment, in Saudi Arabia the fluctuation of oil prices is the most important factor in the growth or decline of domestic production. "Saudi reserves are steadily being depleted, and no significant new discoveries have been found to replace them," according to Middle East journalist Karen House. Saudi population grew sevenfold from 1960 to 2010, and petrol prices are subsidized and cost users less than equivalent quantities of bottled water. With production stagnant, growth in population and domestic energy consumption means a decline in per capita income unless oil prices rise to match that growth.

After 2015, Saudi Arabia embarked on several initiatives, including Vision 2030, aimed at reducing its dependency on oil by investing in other sectors such as tourism, entertainment, and technology. [] . Despite a decline in oil GDP, Saudi Arabia's GDP is expected to grow due to the increase in non-oil GDP. In the second quarter of 2024, Saudi Arabia's GDP contracted by 0.4% year-on-year, primarily due to an 8.5% decline in oil-related activities. However, non-oil activities grew by 4.4%, contributing to a seasonally adjusted growth of 1.4% compared to the previous quarter.

As of 2024, Saudi Arabia's GDP per capita has surpassed all other GCC countries except Qatar and the United Arab Emirates. Saudi Arabia's GDP per capita is estimated to be approximately $33,040 in nominal terms, ranking it 35th globally, and $70,333 in purchasing power parity (PPP) terms, ranking it as the 15th highest in the world []

=== Demographics ===
The Saudi population is young. About 51% of the total population are under the age of 25 (as of February 2012). According to a 2013 report by the International Monetary Fund, up to 1.6 million young nationals of the Persian Gulf countries (of which Saudi Arabia is the largest) will enter the workforce from 2013 to 2018, but the economies of those countries will have jobs in the private sector for less than half (approximately 600,000).

=== Innovation ===
Saudi has not been a hotbed of technological innovation. The number of Saudi patents registered in the United States between 1977 and 2010 came to 382—less than twelve per year—compared to 84,840 patents for South Korea or 20,620 for Israel during that period. However, in 2017 Saudi Arabia was granted 664 patents by the United States Patent and Trademark Office, ranking 23rd among 92 countries. The number of granted patents was double that of all Arab countries combined during the same period.

=== Bureaucracy ===
Business journalist Karen House criticized the Saudi bureaucracy, explaining that someone seeking to start a business in Saudi Arabia:

has to complete innumerable applications and documents at multiple layers of multiple ministries, which invariably requires seeking favours from various patronage networks and accumulating obligations along the way, most probably including having to hire less-than-competent dependents of his patrons. Then, for any business of any size, government contracts, not private competition, are the financial lifeblood. So this means more patrons, more favours, and more obligations. Not surprisingly, Saudi businesses that can compete outside the protected Saudi market are few.

=== Corruption ===
The cost of maintaining the Royal Family is estimated by some to be about US$10 billion per year.

A 2005 survey by the Riyadh Chamber of Commerce found that 77% of businessmen polled felt they had to 'bypass' the law to conduct their operations. By 2012, "businessmen say it has only gotten worse". Saudi Arabia has been severely criticized for failing to tackle money laundering and international terrorism financing. A report released by the Financial Action Task Force on 24 September 2018, says, "Saudi Arabia is not effectively investigating and prosecuting individuals involved in larger scale or professional [money laundering] activity" and is "not effectively confiscating the proceeds of crime".

=== Poverty ===
Estimates of the number of Saudis below the poverty line range from between 12.7% and 25%. Press reports and private estimates as of 2013 "suggest that between 2 million and 4 million" of the country's native Saudis live on "less than about $530 a month" – about $17 a day – considered the poverty line in Saudi Arabia.

According to UNESCWA Oman and Saudi Arabia have the highest poverty rates among GCC nations, at 10.1% and 13.6% respectively and Saudi Arabia saw a notable decline in poverty from 18.2% in 2010 to 13.6% in 2021.

The Saudi state discourages calling attention to or complaining about poverty. In December 2011, days after the Arab Spring uprisings, the Saudi interior ministry detained reporter Feros Boqna and two colleagues (Hussam al-Drewesh and Khaled al-Rasheed) and held them for almost two weeks for questioning after they uploaded a 10-minute video on the topic (Mal3ob 3alena, or 'We are being cheated') to YouTube. Authors of the video claim that 22% of Saudis are considered to be poor (2009) and 70% of Saudis do not own their houses. Statistics on the issue are not available through the UN resources because the Saudi government does not issue poverty figures. Observers researching the issue prefer to stay anonymous because of the risk of being arrested, like Feras Boqna.

Saudi Arabia enacted reforms of its welfare eligibility criteria in 2025, leading to many citizens losing access to monthly benefits they previously received. The regime cracked down on critics, fining citizens and ordering the closure of their social media accounts. Authorities warned that those criticizing the changes could be fined under anti-cyber crime laws.

=== Private sector growth ===
In 2018, the imposition of a 5% value-added tax (VAT) brought private-sector growth to a halt. Consumer spending was also restrained after a sharp increase in prices for energy, electricity, and water earlier in 2018. The kingdom witnessed a mass departure of around 750,000 foreign workers after imposing new government levies on ex-pat workers. The government is also forcing small-business owners to hire Saudi nationals at comparatively higher wages than foreign workers. Gaining money from large, direct foreign investments is also not working in favor of the government. Rich Saudis are reluctant to invest within the kingdom due to the fear of triggering government scrutiny.

On 11 May 2020, the government announced that it would triple the kingdom's VAT on goods and services, raising it from 5% to 15%. It also stated that the increase in VAT—introduced due to the country's current financial crisis due to plummeting oil prices and impact of coronavirus—would also be followed by a cut in monthly allowance for state workers worth approximately $266, and financial benefits for contractors. Aramco decreased the production of its Arab Light grade of crude oil by a significant amount to be shipped to Asia. The firm also cut down oil pricing for its US buyers following wavering demand for fuel due to the global relapse of the coronavirus pandemic.

According to the General Authority for Statistics, Saudi Arabia's inflation accelerated to 6.2% in August 2020, as compared to the same month last year. The report states that the annual inflation rate increased from only 0.5% (in June) to 6.1% (in July), before the increase of VAT to 15% from 5% was introduced, effective from 1 July 2020.

== Investment ==
Saudi Arabia has two stock exchanges, the Tadawul and The Saudi Parallel Market (Nomu), whose financial markets are regulated by the Capital Market Authority. The stock market capitalization of listed companies in Saudi Arabia is valued at $2.22 trillion. According to the International Institute for Management Development, Saudi Arabia experienced the largest improvement in business competitiveness of all countries in 2019; the kingdom rose 13 places to 26th in the world.

=== Doing business ===
Saudi Arabia is among the countries with the most notable improvement in doing business, according to the World Bank Group's "Doing Business" 2020 report. The country jumped 30 places to rank 62nd in ease of doing business, compared to the previous year. Previously, the kingdom had been declining in the overall rankings, from 22nd in 2013 to 92nd in 2018.

According to the World Bank in 2019, Saudi Arabia had conducted reforms in eight areas of business: (1) starting a business, (2) getting construction permits, (3) getting electricity, (4) getting credit, (5) protecting minority investors, (6) trading across borders, (7) enforcing contracts, and (8) resolving insolvency.

Saudi Arabian companies dominate 2009's "MEED 100", with companies listed on the Tadawul accounting for 29 out of the region's 100 biggest publicly quoted companies ranked by market capitalization. Just three of the 20 companies that have dropped out of the top 100 over the past year are listed on the Saudi stock exchange.

Foreigners are allowed to wholly own limited liability companies in the majority of industries. Non-Saudi nationals are required to obtain a foreign capital investment license from the Saudi Arabian General Investment Authority.

With a total of 291 foreign investor licenses issued in the second quarter of 2019, the kingdom has witnessed an increase in international investment, reflecting the economic reforms under the Saudi Vision 2030. Obtaining a foreign investor license became more straightforward as it requires only two documents, and it is processed in three hours.

=== Companies ===
==== Saudi Aramco ====
Saudi Aramco (officially the Saudi Arabian Oil Co.) is Saudi Arabia's national oil, petroleum, and natural gas company headquartered in Dhahran. Saudi Aramco was listed for public trading on 10 December 2019 and had a valuation as of US$2 trillion as of 12 December 2019.

Saudi Aramco has both the second largest proven crude oil reserves, which it claims to be more than 260 billion barrels (4.1×10^{10} m^{3}), and the largest daily oil production. The company operates the world's largest single hydrocarbon network, the Master Gas System. Its yearly production is 3.479 billion barrels (553,100,000 m^{3}), and it manages over 100 oil and gas fields in Saudi Arabia, including 284.8 trillion standard cubic feet (scf) of natural gas reserves. Saudi Aramco owns the Ghawar Field, the world's largest oil field, and the Shaybah Field, another one of the world's largest oil fields.

On 16 November 2020, Saudi Aramco announced hiring banks to sell dollar-denominated bonds with the aim of improving finances after the coronavirus pandemic caused a sharp fall in the global demand for crude oil. Aramco's multi-tranche offer was set to run between 3 and 50 years, depending on the market conditions. The banks hired for the transaction included Citibank, Goldman Sachs International, HSBC, JP Morgan, Morgan Stanley and NCB Capital. Other banks involved in the deal included BNP Paribas, BOC International, BofA Securities, Credit Agricole, First Abu Dhabi Bank, Mizuho, MUFG, SMBC Nikko and Societe Generale.

In 2021, Saudi Aramco made a net-income of 95.5 billion riyals ($25.5 billion) in the second quarter alone, which was the highest level since 2018.

==== SABIC ====
The Saudi Arabian Basic Industries Corporation (SABIC) was established by a royal decree in 1976 to produce chemicals, polymers, and fertilizers. In 2008, SABIC was Asia's largest (in terms of market capitalization) and most profitable publicly listed non-oil company, the world's fourth-largest petrochemical company, the second-largest producer of ethylene glycol and methanol in the world, the third-largest producer of polyethylene and overall the fourth-largest producer of polypropylene and polyolefin. It ranked 186th as the world's largest corporation on the Fortune Global 500 for 2009. Standard & Poor's and Fitch Ratings claimed SABIC to be the world's largest producer of polymers and the Persian Gulf region's largest steel producer for 2005 and assigned SABIC an "A" corporate credit rating. In 2008, Fortune 500 ranking records SABIC revenues at $40.2 billion, profits at $5.8 billion, and assets standing at $72.4 billion.

==== Ma'aden (company) ====
Ma'aden was formed as a Saudi joint stock company on 23 March 1997 for the purpose of facilitating the development of Saudi Arabia's mineral resources. Ma'aden's activities have focused on its active gold business which has grown to include the operation of five gold mines: Mahd Ad Dahab, Al Hajar, Sukhaybarat, Bulghah, and Al Amar. Ma'aden is expanding its activities beyond its gold business with the development of phosphates, aluminium, and other projects. In addition, since its formation, Ma'aden (through the Ministry of Petroleum and Mineral Resources) has collaborated with the government and local legislators to develop a regulatory framework for the governance of the mining industry.

== See also ==
- List of companies of Saudi Arabia
- List of largest companies in Saudi Arabia
- List of Saudis by net worth
- List of Saudi cities by GDP per capita
- Council of Economic and Development Affairs (Saudi Arabia)
- Human resources in Saudi Arabia
- Jeddah Economic Forum
- National Development Fund (Saudi Arabia)
- Public Investment Fund
- Saudi Central Bank
- Saudi Fund for Development
- Technical and Vocational Training Corporation
- Zakat, Tax and Customs Authority
- Economy of the Middle East
