= Abdullah bin Abdulaziz Al Rabeeah =

Saudi Arabian surgeon and government official

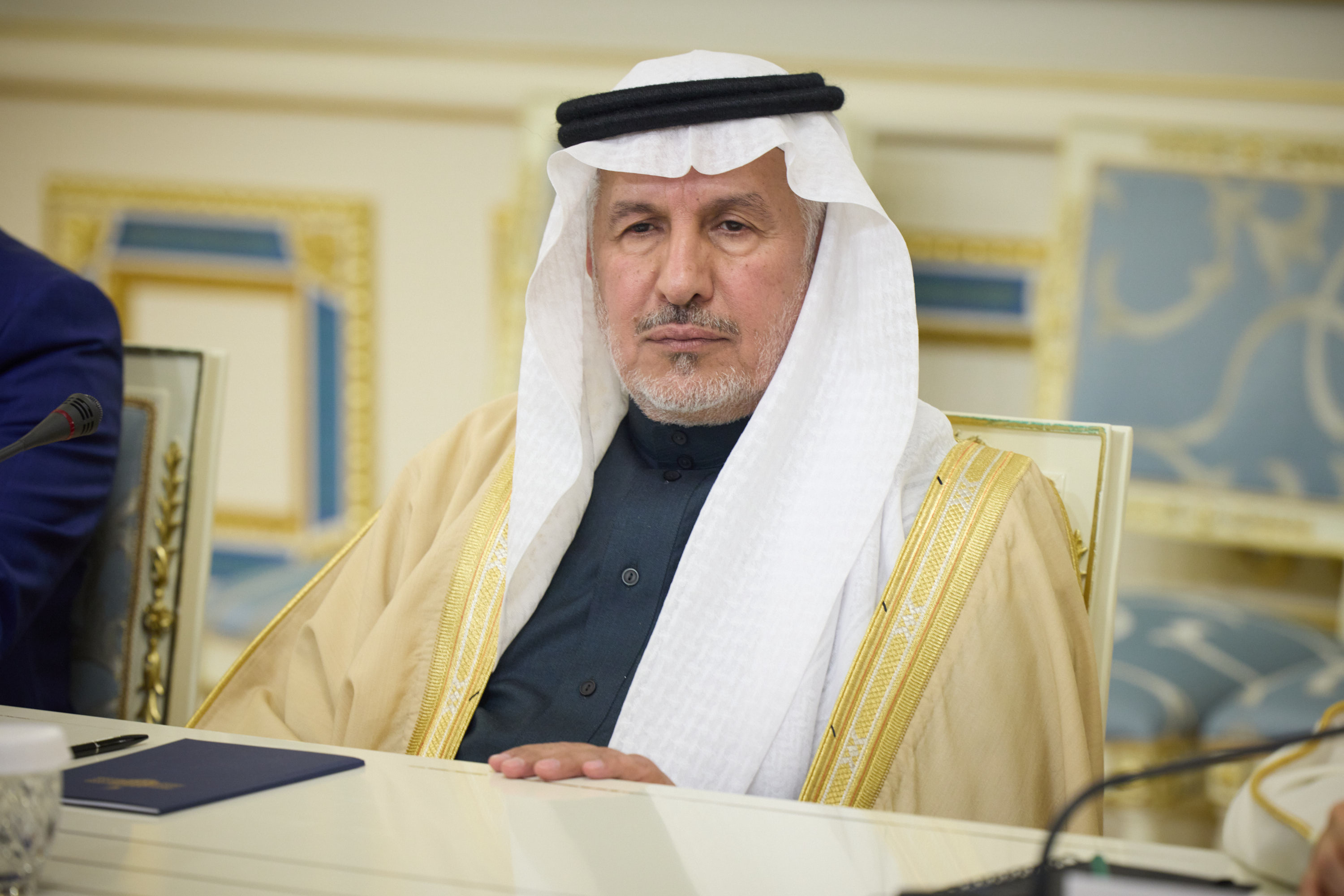

Supervisor General King Salman Humanitarian Aid and Relief Centre
- In office May 2015 – present

Advisor Royal Court
- In office April 2014 – present

Minister of Health (Saudi Arabia)
- In office February 2009 – April 2014
- Preceded by: Hamad Al Manie
- Succeeded by: Adel Fakeih

Chairman of the Board of Directors at King Faisal Specialist Hospital and Research Centre
- In office August 2010 – April 2014

Chief Executive Officer of National Guard Health Affairs
- In office May 2005 – February 2009

President of King Saud bin Abdulaziz University for Health Sciences
- In office July 2003 – February 2009

Personal details
- Born: 23 February 1955 (age 71) Makkah, Kingdom of Saudi Arabia
- Education: King Saud University

Abdullah bin Abdulaziz Al Rabeeah (Arabic: عبد الله بن عبد العزيزالربيعة) is a Saudi pediatric surgeon and former government official. He has filled a number of supervisory and advisory roles in Saudi Arabia, including Minister of Health, Advisor to the Royal Court, and Supervisor General of the international aid agency KSRelief.

== Early life and education ==
Abdullah bin Abdulaziz Al Rabeeah was born in Mecca, Saudi Arabia, on 23 February 1955.

Al Rabeeah attended King Saud University, Riyadh where he obtained his MBBS degree in July 1979. He interned in August 1980 at King Khalid University Hospital, Riyadh. In 1981, Al Rabeeah was formally licensed to practice medicine. He studied at the University of Alberta Hospital, Edmonton (1985) and IWK Hospital for Children, Dalhousie University, Halifax, Nova Scotia (1987) where he completed Fellowships in General and Pediatric Surgery, respectively.

== Career ==
King Abdullah bin Abdulaziz Al Saud appointed Al Rabeeah as Minister of Health for the Kingdom of Saudi Arabia. He was appointed on 14 February 2009. He served as Minister of Health until 21 April 2014.

Al Rabeeah serves as the Supervisor General of the King Salman Humanitarian Aid and Relief Centre (known as KSrelief), headquartered in Riyadh. He concurrently holds the position of Advisor to the Royal Court. KSrelief was inaugurated on 13 May 2015 by the Custodian of the Two Holy Mosques, King Salman Bin Abdulaziz Al Saud; its purpose is to serve both as an aid-monitoring organization and as a direct provider for Saudi humanitarian aid and relief being administered worldwide.

=== Conjoined twins ===
As a pediatric surgeon, Al Rabeeah has performed separations of conjoined twins. He performed his first separation of female Saudi conjoined twins at King Faisal Specialist Hospital & Research Centre, Riyadh in December 1990, as well as a further three. Since 1996, Al Rabeeah and the Saudi National Team have reviewed 99 cases and performed 42 successful separations of conjoined twins from 19 countries. 38 of these surgeries were carried out at the Ministry of National Guard Health Affairs, King Abdulaziz Medical City, Riyadh.

One of the most complex cases that Al Rabeeah undertook was at the request of King Abdullah bin Abdulaziz Al Saud concerning Malaysian conjoined twins, Ahmed and Mohammed. Al Rabeeah performed the surgery on the twins in September 2002. The numerous surgical phases took 23.5 hours and resulted in a successful separation of the boys.

Al Rabeeah wrote a book in Arabic entitled My Experience with Conjoined Twins; this book has been abridged in English. He has published three additional books, and authored entries in 103 scientific/medical/abstract publications.

=== Other positions held ===
- 1992 – present: Head of the Surgical and Multidisciplinary Team for the Saudi National Conjoined Twins Programme
- May 2011: President of the Executive Board of the Arab Health Ministers' Council
- August 2010: Chairman of the Board of Directors, King Faisal Specialist Hospital and Research Centre
- 2003 – 2009: Chief Executive Officer of National Guard Health Affairs
- 2005 – 2009: President of King Saud bin Abdulaziz University for Health Sciences
- 2009 – 2016: Member of the Board of Trustees, King Abdullah University of Science and Technology
- Chairman, Co-Chair, and Honorary Member with many Executive Committees in the Royal Cabinet, Ministry of Health, Saudi Council for Health Specialties and other Government Agencies and Universities
- Chairman of the Riyadh Pediatric Surgery Club
- Chairman of the Board of Trustees for the Saudi Council for Health Specialties
- Chairman, The National Health Insurance Council

== Personal life ==
Al Rabeeah is the father of eight children - seven girls (including a set of identical twins), and one boy. His son, Khalid, followed in his footsteps and is a medical consultant specializing in urology; Khalid also began his career by studying at King Saud University and completing his Fellowship in Canada.

== Recognitions ==
- March 2010, Recognition by Arabian Business Magazine as being the 45th Most Influential Arab.
- December 2012, Sheikh Hamdan Bin Rashid Al Maktoum Award for Medical Sciences for Outstanding Medical Personalities in the Arab World.
- November 2016, Humanitarian Award from the Gulf Cooperation Council (GCC) – Regional Network for Social Responsibility (member of United Nations Global Compact) – Kingdom of Bahrain.
