= Deafness in Somalia =

The exact number of the deaf population in Somalia is unknown, but it's estimated to be around 4,000 people. Somalia has been making steady progress in disability rights. Despite this, in Somalia's Disability Report published in 2024, there was minimal focus on hard-of-hearing (DHH) Somalians or Somalia Sign Language, missing information about education for the deaf community. However, a school in Mogadishu, Somalia, teaches deaf children using Somali Sign Language.

== Human and civil rights ==
=== UN CRPD ===
The human rights of DHH people are outlined in United Nations Convention on the Rights of Persons with Disabilities (CRPD). Somalia ratified the CRPD in 2019. They have not accepted the Optional Protocol to the Convention on the Rights of Persons with Disabilities. While the CRPD applies to all disability communities, the World Federation of the Deaf (WFD) highlights several articles that are of particular interest.

- Sign language rights (Articles 2, 21.b, 21.3, 23.3, and 24.3b)
- Deaf culture and linguistic identity (Article 30.4)
- Bilingual education (Article 24.1, 24.3b, 24.4)
- Lifelong learning (Article 5, 24.5, and 27)
- Accessibility (Article 9 and 21)
- Equal employment opportunities (Article 27)
- Equal participation (Article 5, 12, 20, 23, 24, 29)

=== State Party Report ===
Somalia's initial state party report was due 2023 but has not yet been submitted.

=== Somalia's Disability Report ===
In 2024, the Somalia National Bureau of Statistics published a national report on the status of disabled people. Throughout the report, minimal attention was spent on DHH communities. The word "deaf" or "deafness" is not used once in the document. The following content will detail the most relevant passages of the report as it pertains to DHH communities.

The report spends a section on access to education for people with disabilities, pointing out the significant gap of education access between abled people and disabled people. Despite this, no mention of education for DHH people is made specifically. This report does not discuss if/how sign language is used in Somalian education, though it is present.

== Sign language in Somalia ==
As of February 6, 2025, Somalia's deaf communities and deaf schools use Somali Sign Language (SSL). It began as Kenyan Sign Language, before developing into a sign language specific to Somalia.

=== Legal Status ===
As of 2025, the World Federation of the Deaf has no information on the legal recognition of Somali Sign Language.

== Early intervention ==
Early intervention for deaf and hard of hearing children refers to the services and support provided to families and professionals to help DHH children learn language and build upon speech and social development. Some methods often used for early intervention for DHH children are cochlear implants, hearing aids, and education programs tailored to meet the needs of the child.

Somali's early intervention screening lacks information. In a 2015 analysis of status of newborn screening globally, the study claims under their Middle East and North Africa section, "Although technically part of the region, little is known about screening activities in Sudan and Somalia."

However, in December 2021, Somali opened its first hearing screening reference center in Mogadishu at Recep Tayyip Erdogan Hospital. The website detailing this news states, "The center will use brainstem evoked response audiometry and detect hearing loss in newborns and children."

The humanitarian organization, Al-Ameen announced on their website that Somalia is one of the countries to whom they are providing cochlear implants, specifically for children.

Additionally, a charity organization based in the United Kingdom, the International Medical Relief Agency (IMRA) also announced on their website in May 2024 that they would be sending surgeons to Mogadishu, Somalia to perform ear surgery on impoverished Somalians at Al-Ishan Hospital. IMRA claims that they plan to continue sending medical staff to this hospital.

== Education ==
The Hargeisa School for the Deaf was founded by the community and two deaf women from Wajir, Kenya, and is located in Hargeisa, Somaliland. It was founded in 2001 and despite multiple relocations, continues to operate in Hargeisa. DHH children who had minimal prior experience in traditional school settings appeared to benefit from the acquisition of sign language and socialization that came with attending the school. The school taught in sign language and all the children signed in their interview with BBC. The second school in Somali is Badbaado and Development of Education Organization.

Somaliland native, Safya Hassan, describes the conditions of both of these schools as unsafe, understaffed, and unsanitary.

In Kismayu, Somalia, two schools, Jubba and Fanole Primary and Secondary, have opened classrooms specially for deaf students as of 2019. Four teachers were trained in teaching deaf children, and a sign language training course was given to 100 teachers across different schools. The education provided to these children in Kismayu is free.

== Employment ==
Somalia's employment rate for DHH citizens is low, and many of these individuals struggle in finding work due to work discrimination and a lack of communication access between employer and prospective employee.

Some D/deaf Somalians find work independently through entrepreneurship, such as barber shops and online sales. Self-employment in Somalia is one of the few opportunities DHH people have in finding work and financial stability. Muse Kadle, chairman of SONAD, claims that over 200 members of SONAD have found work through entrepreneurship.

As of October 30, 2024, the UNPD (United Nations Development Programme) Somalia and NDA (National Disability Agency) published the Somali Sign Language Trainer of Trainers Curriculum to give DHH Somalians in the Somali Deaf School in Mogadishu the opportunity to learn how to teach Somalia Sign Language themselves as a career path. This curriculum is funded by the King Salman Humanitarian Aid & Relief Centre.

Efforts by Somali organizations are being made to make employment more equitable in the country, such as the Somali Disability Network. In 2022, they published an article briefly explaining a conference held for employment and education for the D/deaf. In the conference, they discussed the societal challenges that are holding DHH Somalis back from acquiring jobs.
