= King Abdullah Bin Abdulaziz Arabic Health Encyclopedia =

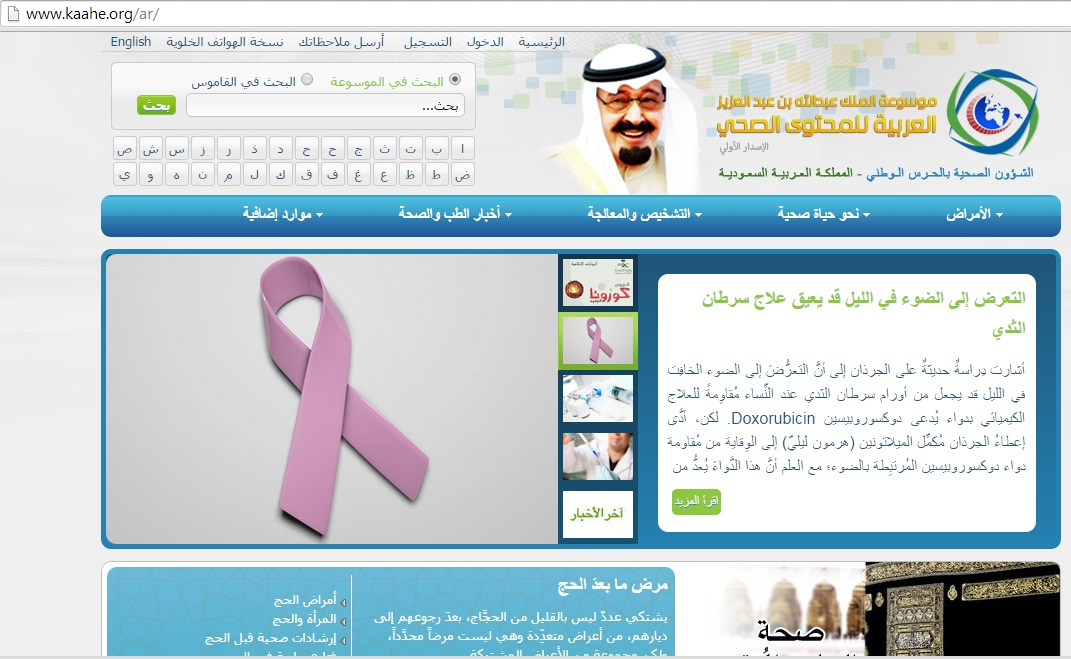
- Website type: Internet encyclopedia project
- Available in: Arabic, English
- Headquarters: Saudi Arabia
- Owners: King Saud bin Abdulaziz University for Health Sciences and Saudi Association for Health informatics
- Website: kaahe.org.sa
- Commercial: No
- Registration: Optional
- Launched: May 2010

The King Abdullah Bin Abdulaziz Arabic Health Encyclopedia (KAAHE) is a bilingual public health encyclopedia published in Arabic and English. It was created in May 2010 by the King Saud bin Abdulaziz University for Health Sciences (KSAU-HS) in collaboration with the Saudi Association for Health Informatics (SAHI). Medical content was added by the World Health Organization (WHO), the Health On the Net Foundation (HON) and the National Guard Health Affairs (NGHA).

According to a paper published in BMC Health Services Research, the Arabic content of KAAHE is easy to understand for both experts and consumers. Although, some sections of the encyclopedia can be improved.

== Establishment ==
The idea of the encyclopedia was presented to His Royal Highness Prince Muqrin bin Abdulaziz, Head of General Intelligence and Honorary President of the Saudi Health Informatics Society, who in turn conveyed the idea to the Custodian of the Two Holy Mosques King Abdullah bin Abdulaziz, who kindly approved it and allocated a budget for the project. This was announced at the Saudi e-Health Conference held in Riyadh in 2010.

After that, work began on the project, and the Saudi National Guard Health Affairs and King Saud bin Abdulaziz University for Health Sciences, in partnership with the Saudi Society for Health Informatics, took upon themselves the task of implementing the encyclopedia project, by providing the necessary resources, starting with specialized medical staff, through providing technical and financial requirements, ending with signing many agreements and partnerships with specialized international bodies and organizations in order to support the encyclopedia and provide it with medical content, so an agreement was signed with World Health Organization, American Institute for Health Education, UK National Health Service, Swiss Online Health Foundation, and others.

The first phase of the project was launched at the Saudi e-Health Conference held in Riyadh on March 11, 2012 in the presence of His Royal Highness Prince Muqrin bin Abdulaziz, Head of General Intelligence and Honorary President of the Saudi Society for Health Informatics to be the first scientifically reliable Arab health encyclopedia on the Internet.

== Sections ==
The encyclopedia contains five main sections: medical topics, towards a healthy life, management and treatment, medicine and health news, and additional resources.

=== Medical subjects ===
This section contains integrated medical topics that include various diseases and health problems, divided by medical specialization

=== Towards a healthy life ===
This section contains topics in health promotion for different ages.

=== Measure and treatment ===
This section contains information about various medications and medical procedures such as analyzes and surgeries

=== Medical and health news ===
In this section, medical scientific news is published periodically in cooperation with specialized medical news bodies.

=== Additional resources ===
This section contains topics in the fields of alternative medicine, the history of Islamic and Arabic medicine, and health guidance, as well as a medical library and a medical dictionary.

The encyclopedia also contains a library of visual media, which includes explanations of many medical conditions or experiences of patients with their health conditions, and these media have been linked to related topics. Moreover, the Arabic Health Encyclopedia offers personalized services and interactive applications, in a clear and easy-to-use way.

== See also ==
- Arabic encyclopedia
