= Al Basar International Foundation =

Blindness organization based in Saudi Arabia

Coordinates: 15°34′37.46″N 32°34′0.49″E

- Founded: 1989; 37 years ago
- Purpose: Cataract
- Location: Al Khobar, Saudi Arabia
- Origins: Saudi Arabia
- Region served: Asia and Africa
- Product: Ophthalmology
- Method: Free Eye Camps, Eye Hospitals and Eye Institutes
- Key people: Adel Al Rushood
- Website: al-basar.com/en/

Al-Basar International Foundation (Arabic: مؤسسة البصر الخيرية العالمية) is a non-profit international NGO based in Saudi Arabia. It was established in 1989 to work in the field of prevention and eradication/controlling of blindness & blinding diseases.

It works together with King Salman Humanitarian Aid and Relief Center in Yemen, Bangladesh, Sudan, Nigeria and Pakistan to fight blindness and eye disease. and performed surgeries in Sudan

In a 2019 campaign funded by King Salman Humanitarian Aid and Relief Centre in collaboration with Al Basar International Foundation, medical volunteers from Saudi Arabia met 8000 eye patients and performed 800 eye surgeries to remove cataract and glaucoma in Ibadan, Nigeria, as well as in Lafia in Nasarawa State, Nigeria.

== Makkah Eye Specialist Hospital ==
The foundation manages the Makkah Eye Specialist Hospital located in Kano state with 4,000 free eye surgeries carried out in 2021. The hospital carries out treatment for eye conditions including diabetic retinopathy.

In 2022, Al Basar International Foundation in collaboration with King Salman Relief Center sponsored 400 free cataract surgeries for kano occupants which took place at Makkah Eye Specialist Hospital.
