= List of Saudi cities by GDP per capita =

This article includes a list of the main Saudi cities sorted by their Gross Domestic Product (GDP) per capita, the list includes 5 cities, Riyadh, Jeddah, Khobar, Dhahran and Dammam. The currency is sorted by the Saudi Riyal, which can also be worked out in the US Dollar.

Currently Dhahran is within the highest GDP per capita in the Middle East going after Qatar. Ranking the first in Saudi Arabia, Dhahran's Economic development is however reaching at a high level.

== List cities by GDP per capita ==
Ranking	City / Urban Area	GDP Per capita (SAR)	GDP Per capita ($US)
1	(Saudi Arabia) Dhahran	209,774	$ 55,940
2	(Saudi Arabia) Riyadh	121,395	$ 32,372
3	(Saudi Arabia) Khobar	121,277	$ 32,358
4	(Saudi Arabia) Jeddah	117,272	$ 31,273
5	(Saudi Arabia) Dammam	87,570	$ 23,352

== See also ==
- Al Jubail
- List of Brazilian states by GDP per capita
- Saudi Arabia
- Middle East
- List of countries by GDP (PPP) per capita
