= List of Saudis by net worth =

This is a list of Saudis by net worth, compiled by Forbes magazine. This is a partial list of the richest people in Saudi Arabia. Other comprehensive lists are published by Arabian Business magazine.

== Saudi billionaires ==
Name	Estimated wealth (USD)	Source
Al-Waleed bin Talal	$16 billion	Investments
Al Ibrahim family	$2 billion	Diversified
Abunayyan family	$3 billion	Diversified
Abu Daoud family	$2 billion	Diversified
Al Jaber family	$2 billion	Diversified
Al Agil family	$2 billion	Diversified
Al Subai family	$2 billion	Diversified
Al Gosaibi family	$2 billion	Diversified
Sulaiman Al Habib	$10 billion	Diversified
Al Othaim Family	$3 billion	Diversified
Jamjoom Family	$1 billion	Diversified
Al Sagri family	$2 billion	Diversified
Faqeeh family	$3 billion	Diversified
Al nahdi family	$3 billion	Diversified
Ali Reza family	$1 billion	Diversified
Al-Muhaidib	$8 billion	Diversified
bin Laden family	$8 billion	Diversified
Mohammed Hussein Al Amoudi	$9 billion	Diversified
AlRajhi family	$13 billion	Diversified
Sharbatly family	$1 billion	Diversified
Saleh Kamel	$2 billion	Diversified
Al hokair	$3 billion	Diversified
Khalid bin Mahfouz & family	$12.5 billion	Diversified
