= King Saud bin Abdulaziz University for Health Sciences =

Public health science university headquartered in Riyadh, Saudi Arabia

Coordinates: 24°44′53″N 46°51′42″E

- جامعة الملك سعود بن عبدالعزيز للعلوم الصحية
- Motto: جامعة لصحة وطن
- Motto in English: A university for a nation's health.
- Type: Public
- Established: March 6, 2005; 21 years ago
- Founder: Abdullah bin Abdulaziz
- Affiliations: Ministry of Education (Saudi Arabia)
- President: Bandar Al Knawy
- Vice-president: Prof. Abdulmohsen Alkushi, Prof. Fayez Al Hejaili, Prof. Mohamed S. Al-Moamary
- Students: 13,161 (2024)
- Location: Riyadh, Jeddah, and Al Ahsa, Saudi Arabia
- Campus: Multiple campuses
- Nickname: KSAU-HS
- Website: ksau-hs.edu.sa

King Saud bin Abdulaziz University for Health Sciences (KSAU-HS) (Arabic: جامعة الملك سعود بن عبدالعزيز للعلوم الصحية) is a public university with its main campus in Riyadh, Saudi Arabia. The university has two additional branches in Al-Ahsa and Jeddah. It comprises fourteen colleges across three campuses in Riyadh, Jeddah, and Al-Ahsa.

The university offers diploma, bachelor's, and postgraduate programmes to its students. It was established in 2005 by Crown Prince Abdullah bin Abdulaziz as an academic institute specialising in health sciences and is named after King Saud bin Abdulaziz, the ruler of Saudi Arabia between 1953 and 1964.

== History ==
The university's origins can be traced to postgraduate medical training programmes offered by the Ministry of National Guard Health Affairs (NGHA) since the mid-1980s. These programmes preceded the development of the King Abdulaziz Academy of Health Sciences at King Abdulaziz Medical City in Riyadh. By January 2004, plans had been announced to establish a College of Medicine and to construct a new College of Nursing.

The university was formally established in 2005. On 16 March that year, Crown Prince Abdullah approved plans to convert the pre-existing Academy of Health Sciences at King Abdulaziz Medical City in Riyadh into a university of health. The advanced medical facilities at the King Abdulaziz Medical City provided the corresponding clinical environment necessary for the establishment of the university.

On 13 May 2008, King Abdullah laid the foundation stone for the university, with plans announced for campuses in Riyadh, Jeddah, and Al-Ahsa. The university subsequently expanded its facilities across the three cities. The main campus facility in Riyadh was opened in April 2013. The Al-Ahsa campus was inaugurated in October 2014, followed by the Jeddah campus in August 2015.

KSAU-HS's main campus in Riyadh hosts seven colleges: the College of Medicine, the College of Dentistry, the College of Pharmacy, the College of Public Health and Health Informatics, the College of Applied Medical Sciences, the College of Nursing, and the College of Science and Health Professions. The Jeddah Campus hosts the College of Medicine, the College of Nursing, the College of Applied Medical Sciences, and the College of Sciences and Health Professions. Finally, the Al-Ahsa Campus hosts the College of Applied Medical Science, the College of Nursing, and the College of Sciences and Health Professions.

Under the auspices of NGHA, KSAU-HS students have access to the King Abdulaziz Medical Cities, which provide facilities for clinical training. The university's curricula and academic programmes incorporate clinical training supervised by healthcare professionals.

== Campuses ==
KSAU-HS operates campuses in Riyadh, Jeddah, and Al-Ahsa.

=== Riyadh Campus ===
The Riyadh campus was established on 23 April 2013.

The campus is located alongside King Abdulaziz Medical City, and forms part of the university's health sciences education and clinical training infrastructure. The campus spans approximately six million square metres and has a capacity for 10,000 students. It also accommodates graduate studies and facilities for clinical skills education.

The campus includes academic and administrative buildings, a conference centre, and residential accommodation. The original development provided housing for students and university staff, including apartments and villas. The conference centre has also been identified as a venue for scientific meetings organised by the university.

Facilities on the campus are connected to King Abdulaziz Medical City via electric shuttle vehicles, which opened in 2013. The service stops at 12 dual boarding stations, starting from the residential area through entertainment and academic facilities and ending at the southern area of the medical city where the female sections of the Colleges of Medicine and Nursing are located.

=== Jeddah Campus ===
The Jeddah campus of KSAU-HS is located within King Abdulaziz Medical City in Jeddah. The campus was among the university's development projects announced in 2008 and was inaugurated on Dhu al-Qi'dah 1436 AH (26 August 2015) by Prince Miteb bin Abdullah, the then minister of the National Guard. The inauguration also included the Jeddah branch of King Abdullah International Medical Research Centre (KAIMRC).

The campus occupies approximately 75,000 square metres, with a capacity of 4,000 students.

The campus includes academic and administrative buildings, clinical skills training facilities, and student accommodation, in addition to a library, classrooms, and an 800-seat auditorium.

=== Al-Ahsa Campus ===
Opened 27 October 2014, the campus accommodates 3,000 students and is designed for future expansion.

The campus also includes buildings for the Deanship of Graduate Studies, the Clinical Skills Development Centre, the Information Centre, and a residential area complete with all necessary sports, recreational, and service facilities.

== Academics ==
KSAU-HS provides undergraduate and postgraduate education in health sciences. Across its academic structure, consisting of the 14 colleges across its three campuses, the university offers courses in medicine, dentistry, pharmacy, nursing, public health, health informatics, and allied health disciplines.

=== Academic programmes and degrees. ===
Included within its course offerings, the university's College of Medicine provides a Bachelor of Medicine, Bachelor of Surgery (MBBS) degree through post-secondary and graduate-entry pathways.

Additional courses include the Doctor of Pharmacy (PharmD) degree and undergraduate education in nursing and allied health disciplines. Its postgraduate programmes include the Master of Public Health Systems Management, offered through the College of Public Health and Health Informatics.

=== Accreditation and recognition ===
The university's medical courses are subject to national academic accreditation. The College of Medicine underwent a national academic accreditation process in 2019 and received accreditation from Saudi Arabia's National Centre for Academic Accreditation and Evaluation (NCAAA) in March 2021. The NCAAA subsequently received recognition from the World Federation for Medical Education in April 2022, for a period of ten years.

In June 2025, the Commission on Accreditation of Healthcare Management Education (CAHME) granted an initial four-year accreditation to KSAU-HS's Master of Public Health in Health Systems Management programme. CAHME identified it as the first Master of Public Health programme outside North America to receive its accreditation.

== Research ==
Research associated with KSAU-HS is conducted within a network that includes the NGHA and King Abdullah International Medical Research Centre (KAIMRC). Research activities within this institutional network include biomedical, clinical, and public health research, with projects addressing chronic diseases, stem cells, population health, and genetic factors associated with disease.

=== King Abduallah International Medical Research Centre ===
KAIMRC is a medical research institution associated with KSAU-HS and the NGHA. Its designation was approved in 2005. The centre conducts and supports biomedical, clinical, and applied health research, with research facilities in the central, western, and eastern regions of Saudi Arabia.

The centre was among the projects announced during the National Guard's university and healthcare development programme in May 2008. A branch of KAIMRC in Jeddah was inaugurated alongside the university's Jeddah campus in August 2015. The Jeddah research facilities was described as containing laboratories, animal research facilicites, medical imaging equipment and biobanking infrastructure.

KAIMRC's research includes the Saudi Biobank and a cord blood bank. The Saudi Biobank supports research into environmental and other factors associated with chronic diseases, while the cord blood bank collects and preserves umbilical cord blood for potential use in haematopoietic stem cell transplantation.

In September 2015, KAIMRC's cord blood bank in Riyadh received accreditation from the Foundation for the Accreditation of Cellular Therapy (FACT) for public and private family cord blood banking. In May 2025, the Saudi Accreditation Centre awarded ISO 20387 accreditation to the Saudi Biobank for its biobanking activities.

== International collaboration ==
KSAU-HS has a number of agreements and memoranda of understanding relating to academic collaboration with reputable North American, European, and Australian universities and institutions.

A memorandum of understanding with the Royal College of Physicians and Surgeons of Canada, provides for the establishment of a Collaborating Centre for CanMEDS competencies in Saudi Arabia. It will serve as the hub of a network of medical educators, trainers, and faculty committed to supporting, developing, and facilitating CanMEDS in all domains of medical education at both undergraduate, and postgraduate levels, as well as in professional practice.

The centre will host and organise a series of conferences and workshops on residency training, and develop network of medical educators, and deliver education and training to trainees in postgraduate medical education programs in Saudi Arabia.

In November 2010, KSAU-HS hosted the Saudi Arabian Conference on Residency Education (SACRE). The conference highlighted the collaboration between KSAU-HS and the Royal College of Physicians and Surgeons of Canada. Topics discussed in the conference programme included: key trends in the development of residency education; quality in residency programmes; contemporary and emerging tools for the assessment of resident competence; the use of simulation technology in teaching and learning in postgraduate medical education; teaching the domains of physician competence using the CanMEDS framework; best research practices in residency education; new approaches to enhance excellence in teaching and assessment in residency; current controversies in residency education and their implications for residency programmes.

The Association for Medical Education in the Eastern Mediterranean Region (AMEEMR) selected King Saud bin Abdulaziz University as the location of its headquarters. This decision came at the association's 2010 General Assembly, which the College of Medicine at KSAU-HS hosted. Twenty-three representatives from 15 countries and a representative of the president of the World Federation for Medical Education (WFME) attended the meeting.

KSAU-HS has a number of licensing agreements to develop its academic programmes with universities worldwide: University of Sydney (Australia); University of Liverpool (UK); South Alabama University (USA); Flinders University (Australia); University of Arkansas (USA), Thomas Jefferson University (USA) University of Maryland (USA), Maastricht University (Netherlands), the University of Oklahoma (USA) and the University of Tennessee Health Science Center (USA).

== See also ==
- King Abdullah Abdul Aziz Health Encyclopedia
- List of universities and colleges in Saudi Arabia
