= Human resources in Saudi Arabia =

Nationalization (Saudization) was introduced in Saudi Arabia in June 2011 by the Ministry of Labor to replace foreign workers with Saudi nationals. Companies in the private sector have quotas by Nitaqat for their Saudisation levels. In accordance with the Saudi Arabia Central Department of Statistics and Information (CDSI), unemployment rates of Saudi nationals decreased to 11.7% in 2015. It was 5.9% among men and 32.5% among women.

Saudi Arabia introduced the Hafiz program in 2011 which have benefited a million unemployed Saudis nationals. The Hafiz program, which pays unemployed Saudis SR2,000 ($600) a month for up to one year, was announced by King Abdullah in late 2011.
