= Ministry of National Guard Health Affairs =

- Ministry of National Guard
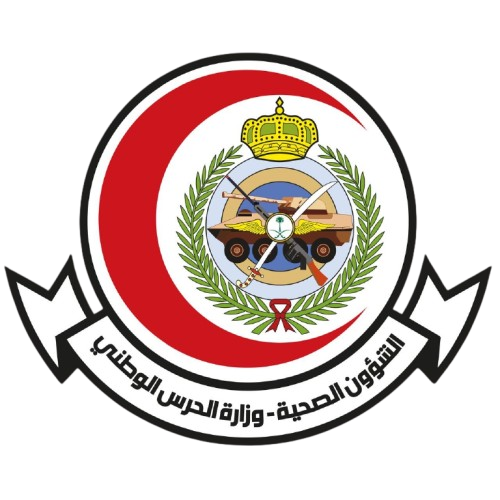

Geography
- Location: Riyadh, Jeddah, Al-Ahsa, Dammam, Medina, Taif, Qassim, Saudi Arabia

Organisation
- Type: Specialist

History
- Founded: 1982

Links
- Website: https://mngha.med.sa

The Ministry of National Guard Health Affairs (MNGHA) is a leading governmental healthcare system in the Kingdom of Saudi Arabia, operating under the Ministry of National Guard. It is considered one of the most prominent providers of advanced healthcare services in the Kingdom. MNGHA delivers specialized, preventive, and rehabilitative medical services to National Guard personnel and their families, as well as to a wide segment of citizens, through an integrated network of medical cities, hospitals, and healthcare centers across various regions of the Kingdom.

The system includes a number of specialized healthcare facilities, most notably King Abdulaziz Medical Cities in Riyadh and Jeddah, in addition to hospitals in Al-Ahsa, Dammam, Madinah, Taif, and Qassim. It also encompasses primary healthcare centers and advanced centers in cardiology, oncology, organ transplantation, and specialized medicine. MNGHA is supported by an integrated educational and research ecosystem that includes King Saud bin Abdulaziz University for Health Sciences and King Abdullah International Medical Research Center, strengthening its role in medical education, training, and scientific research.

MNGHA also adopts an ambitious digital transformation strategy aimed at automating healthcare and administrative processes to enhance efficiency. Key features of this transformation include:

- Electronic Health System: Implementation of advanced electronic medical record systems, ensuring rapid access to patient data and improving diagnostic accuracy and follow-up across all medical cities.
- E-Services: Activation of integrated digital platforms that allow beneficiaries (employees and patients) to access appointments, lab results, and prescriptions electronically, in addition to automating internal administrative processes.
- Infrastructure & Artificial Intelligence: Investment in AI technologies and big data analytics to support medical and administrative decision-making, alongside developing IT infrastructure to ensure data security and integrity.
- Innovation in Support Services: Launching technological initiatives aimed at accelerating emergency response and developing innovative solutions to address future health challenges in alignment with Saudi Vision 2030.
- Global Achievements: MNGHA has achieved a global technological milestone, with King Abdulaziz Medical City in Riyadh becoming the first healthcare facility worldwide to earn four HIMSS Stage 7 certifications—the highest level of recognition by the Healthcare Information and Management Systems Society (HIMSS). It is also the first in Europe, the Middle East, and Africa to achieve this comprehensive accomplishment, placing it at the forefront of global digital healthcare institutions.

MNGHA contributes to the development of the healthcare sector in Saudi Arabia by adopting the latest medical practices and technologies, supporting innovation and scientific research, and participating in achieving the healthcare transformation goals of Saudi Vision 2030.

== Facilities ==
=== King Abdulaziz Medical City in Riyadh ===
King Abdulaziz Medical City in Riyadh is one of the major medical cities under MNGHA. It was established in 1982 and began receiving patients in May 1983. It is considered one of the most comprehensive and largest specialized medical centers in the region, providing advanced and integrated healthcare services to National Guard personnel, their families, referred patients from across the Kingdom, as well as private patients through business center services.

It provides comprehensive services across a wide range of medical and surgical specialties, including outpatient clinics, employee clinics, general and specialized surgeries for adults and children, anesthesia, internal medicine, obstetrics and gynecology, ophthalmology, pediatrics, dentistry, ENT, psychiatry, emergency services, intensive care units, physical therapy, medical imaging, pharmacy, and nursing services. Specialized programs include conjoined twins separation, organ transplantation, infection prevention and control, laboratories and pathology, family safety program, and home healthcare services.

Facilities and Infrastructure:

The city includes several specialized facilities, such as:

- King Fahad Hospital
- King Abdullah Specialized Children's Hospital
- Women’s Specialized Hospital
- King Abdulaziz Cardiac Center
- Organ Transplant Center
- Oncology Center
- Chronic Diseases Center
- Blood Donation Center

It also features advanced infrastructure and technologies supporting complex surgical procedures.

Education and Training Role:

The city is a major academic and research hub affiliated with King Saud bin Abdulaziz University for Health Sciences and King Abdullah International Medical Research Center. It contributes to organizing medical conferences and forming partnerships locally and internationally.

=== King Abdulaziz Medical City - Jeddah ===
King Abdulaziz Medical City in Jeddah is one of the medical cities under to the Ministry of National Guard Health Affairs in the Kingdom of Saudi Arabia. It was inaugurated in July 1982 and is located in the city of Jeddah, covering an area of approximately 2.30 km².

The city provides comprehensive and specialized healthcare services through an integrated system of hospitals and medical centers. Its services include specialized care, emergency services, advanced surgeries, intensive care, as well as diagnostic and treatment services across various medical specialties.

The city includes a number of specialized healthcare facilities, the prominent among them are King Abdullah Specialized Children’s Hospital in Jeddah, Princess Noura bint Abdulrahman Al-Faisal Oncology Center, King Faisal Cardiac Center, Rehabilitation Center, Diabetes Center, Neurosciences and Trauma Center, Blood Donation Center, and Burn Unit, in addition to several other medical departments.

The city is also connected to medical education and scientific research through its collaboration with King Saud bin Abdulaziz University for Health Sciences and King Abdullah International Medical Research Center, which enhances its role in training healthcare professionals and advancing medical research. The city is considered a key component of the Ministry of National Guard Health Affairs system, which provides services to National Guard personnel and their families, as well as a wide segment of the community.

King Abdulaziz Hospital – Al-Ahsa:

King Abdulaziz Hospital in Al-Ahsa is one of the hospitals affiliated with the Ministry of National Guard Health Affairs. It is located in Al-Ahsa Governorate in the Eastern Province of the Kingdom of Saudi Arabia. The hospital was inaugurated in 1423H (2002). It was built on a total area of approximately 36,000 square meters, distributed over three floors. The hospital is considered one of the main healthcare facilities in the region, providing comprehensive medical services to National Guard personnel and their families, in addition to a wide segment of beneficiaries.

The hospital was established in the early 2000s as part of the expansion plan of the National Guard’s healthcare services. It operates within an integrated medical system that relies on the latest technologies and modern standards in healthcare delivery.

The hospital provides a wide range of medical services, including emergency care, outpatient clinics, surgical operations across various specialties, intensive care units, radiology and medical imaging services, laboratory services, rehabilitation and physiotherapy programs, women’s health and obstetrics services, as well as a dialysis center. It also includes several specialized departments that deliver advanced care in internal medicine, surgery, pediatrics, and other medical fields.

The hospital serves as an important center for medical education and training through its affiliation with King Saud bin Abdulaziz University for Health Sciences. It is used as a training site for students of health colleges and residency programs, contributing to the development of national healthcare professionals. The hospital is also committed to implementing internationally accredited standards of quality and patient safety, as part of the Ministry of National Guard Health Affairs system, which has received multiple accreditations in healthcare.

Strategically located within Al-Ahsa Governorate, the hospital serves a wide population across surrounding communities, making it one of the key pillars of healthcare delivery in the Eastern Province.

Imam Abdulrahman Al Faisal Hospital – Dammam:

Imam Abdulrahman Al Faisal Hospital is one of the hospitals affiliated with the Ministry of National Guard Health Affairs in Dammam, located in the Eastern Province of the Kingdom of Saudi Arabia. The hospital was inaugurated in 1423H (2002), with a total area of approximately 110 square meters. The hospital serves as one of the healthcare facilities that provide advanced medical care to National Guard personnel and their families, in addition to other patient groups within the Kingdom’s healthcare system.

The hospital aims to deliver comprehensive healthcare services at the secondary care level, with a focus on continuity of care and improving the quality of medical services in line with the latest international standards, ensuring efficiency in healthcare delivery and patient safety.

The hospital includes a wide range of medical departments and specialties, including outpatient clinics, internal medicine, pediatrics, general surgery, obstetrics and gynecology, emergency services, ear, nose, and throat (ENT), ophthalmology, dentistry, and psychiatry. It also provides radiology, laboratory, and pharmacy services, infection prevention and control programs, home healthcare services, bed management, and a family safety program. In addition, it operates a primary healthcare center in King Fahd Residential City in Dammam, making it a comprehensive healthcare facility serving the Eastern Province.

Over the years, the hospital has played a significant role in enhancing the level of healthcare services in the Eastern Province and remains one of the vital institutions supporting the Kingdom’s vision to develop the healthcare sector and improve quality of life.

Prince Mohammed bin Abdulaziz Hospital – Madinah:

Prince Mohammed bin Abdulaziz Hospital is one of the hospitals affiliated with the Ministry of National Guard Health Affairs in Madinah. The hospital was inaugurated in 2012. It is considered one of the modern healthcare facilities that provides comprehensive medical services to Ministry personnel and their families, in addition to eligible patients within the Kingdom of Saudi Arabia.

The hospital was established as part of the expansion of the National Guard’s healthcare services and is the fifth facility under the Ministry’s Health Affairs system after Riyadh, Jeddah, Dammam, and Al-Ahsa. It is located on Prince Nayef bin Abdulaziz Road in Al-Dar district, one of the key areas in Madinah.

The hospital offers a wide range of healthcare services, including specialized medical care, outpatient clinics, inpatient services, and 24/7 emergency services, in addition to surgical procedures and various diagnostic services. It also includes a number of advanced medical specialties such as cardiology, neurology, gastroenterology, and nephrology, as well as dental services, palliative care, and mental health services. It also supports primary healthcare centers in Madinah and Yanbu.

The hospital has witnessed significant development in the level of services and medical technologies, successfully introducing advanced treatment procedures, such as specialized ear surgery techniques performed for the first time in the region. This reflects its advanced medical capabilities and the high competence of its healthcare staff. The hospital has also obtained international accreditations in healthcare quality and patient safety, including accreditation from the Joint Commission International (JCI).

Prince Mohammed bin Abdulaziz Hospital represents one of the key healthcare centers in the Madinah region and contributes to supporting the advanced healthcare system in the Kingdom by providing clinical and educational services in line with the latest international medical standards.

King Salman Specialized Hospital – Taif:

King Salman bin Abdulaziz Specialized Hospital in Taif began operations in February 2025. It is spans an area of around 980,000 square meters. The hospital includes modern medical facilities such as patient towers, diagnostic and treatment centers, and outpatient clinics.

It offers comprehensive healthcare services across multiple specialties and utilizes advanced medical technologies to deliver high-quality care.

King Abdullah Specialized Hospital – Qassim:

King Abdullah Specialized Hospital in Qassim is a modern specialized healthcare project under MNGHA. It spans approximately 1,890,000 square meters. The facility includes a patient tower, diagnostic and treatment center, and outpatient clinics, designed to provide high-quality specialized care.

The hospital is being prepared to operate according to the latest international standards and will significantly enhance healthcare services in the Qassim region.

== King Saud Bin Abdulaziz University for Health Sciences ==
The King Saud Bin Abdulaziz University for Health Sciences was formally established in 2005 as a result of the positive feedback from the postgraduate programs in various medical fields being offered by the National Guard Health Affairs since the mid-1980s. It is now the best university in Saudi Arabia to provide health staff.

== King Abdullah International Medical Research Center ==
The King Abdullah International Medical Research Center is the hub of biomedical and clinical research at MNG-HA.

== Notable people ==
- Qanta Ahmed, British-American physician specializing in sleep disorders, and author, women's rights activist, journalist, and public commentator.

== See also ==
- List of things named after Saudi kings
- King Abdullah International Medical Research Center
