= King Abdullah International Medical Research Center =

Research institute in Saudi Arabia

King Abdullah International Medical Research Center (KAIMRC)
- Abbreviation: KAIMRC
- Formation: 11 November 2006
- Founder: Custodian of the Two Holy Mosques King Abdullah bin Abdul Aziz
- Founded at: Riyadh, Saudi Arabia
- Headquarters: Riyadh, Saudi Arabia
- Location: Riyadh, Jeddah, Al-Ahsa
- Parent organization: Ministry of National Guard Health Affairs
- Website: kaimrc.ksau-hs.edu.sa

King Abdullah International Medical Research Center (KAIMRC) is an international institute of biomedical and clinical research. It was launched on 11 November 2006 with the approval of the Custodian of the Two Holy Mosques, King Abdullah bin Abdulaziz. The center is part of the Ministry of National Guard Health Affairs and is located in Riyadh, Saudi Arabia, with campuses in Jeddah and Al-Ahsa.

== Achievements ==
KAIMRC was awarded accreditation by the Association for the Accreditation of Human Research Protection Programs (AAHRPP) on July 3, 2023. The center has also started a Phase I clinical trial for a vaccine against the Middle East respiratory syndrome coronavirus (MERS-CoV) in collaboration with the Jenner Institute at the University of Oxford.
