= King Salman Humanitarian Aid and Relief Center =

Main foreign aid agency of Saudi Arabia

- مركز الملك سلمان للإغاثة والأعمال الإنسانية
- Abbreviation: KSrelief
- Formation: 13 May 2015
- Location: Riyadh, Saudi Arabia
- Coordinates: 24.7132731°N 46.6320562°E
- Supervisor General: Dr. Abdullah Al-Rabeeah
- Website: ksrelief.org

The King Salman Humanitarian Aid and Relief Center (KSrelief) (Note: Arabic: مركز الملك سلمان للإغاثة والأعمال الإنسانية) is the government agency responsible for managing and coordinating Saudi Arabia's international humanitarian aid and relief operations. Saudi Arabia is the second-largest donor of humanitarian aid globally behind the United States. Operating as the centralized authority for the country's external assistance, the center administers foreign aid distribution and manages formal partnerships with international non-governmental organizations and United Nations agencies.

== History ==
Prior to the establishment of the King Salman Humanitarian Aid and Relief Center in 2015, Saudi Arabia distributed international humanitarian and developmental assistance across multiple government ministries, specialized state funds, and dedicated regional committees. External aid was segmented by functional and geographic categories rather than operating under a single centralized agency.

Developmental assistance for infrastructure, agricultural, and economic projects was primarily channeled through the Saudi Fund for Development, which was established by royal decree in October 1974 to issue low-interest soft loans and grants to developing nations. Large-scale bilateral financial assistance, structural grants, and institutional capital to foreign governments were managed directly by the Ministry of Finance and the Ministry of Foreign Affairs. Targeted disaster relief and regional emergencies were often overseen by specialized state-sponsored campaigns, such as the Saudi High Commission for Relief of Bosnia and Herzegovina, which was formed in 1993 to coordinate dedicated financial, medical, and reconstruction aid following the outbreak of the Bosnian War. State-funded humanitarian allocations were also handled via contributions to international bodies, including partnerships with United Nations agencies such as the World Food Programme and the UN Relief and Works Agency (UNRWA). Educational development and international scholarships for foreign nationals were overseen by the Ministry of Education.

This multi-channeled approach made it difficult to comprehensively track and document the country's external expenditures according to global transparency benchmarks. In May 2015, the state initiated an institutional reform to consolidate its aid mechanisms. External humanitarian operations, refugee assistance, and disaster response programs—including the historical files of the individual regional relief committees—were officially centralized under the King Salman Humanitarian Aid and Relief Center to establish a single reporting entity aligned with international standard-setting bodies like the OECD Development Assistance Committee.

== List of supervisors general ==
No.	Image	Name	Took office	Left office	Time in office
1		Dr. Abdullah Al-Rabeeah	13 May 2015	Incumbent	11 years, 171 days

== See also ==
- Humanitarian aid
- Al-Basar International Foundation
- Saudi High Commission for Relief of Bosnia and Herzegovina
