= King Abdulaziz Medical City (Riyadh) =

King Abdulaziz Medical City, Riyadh

Geography
- Location: Riyadh, Saudi Arabia
- Coordinates: 24.752259°N 46.857800°E

Organisation
- Care system: Private
- Type: District General
- Affiliated university: King Saud bin Abdulaziz University for Health Sciences

Services
- Standards: JCI
- Emergency department: Yes
- Beds: 1501

History
- Founded: 1 May 1983

Links
- Website: www.mngha.med.sa

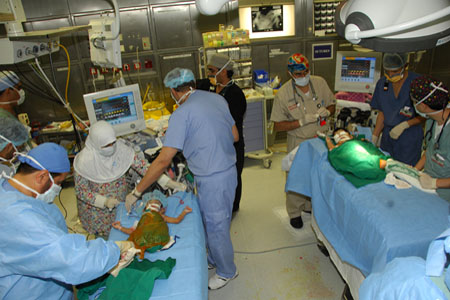
Doctors providing care to Saudi newborn twins at King Abdulaziz Medical City

King Abdulaziz Medical City, Riyadh is a medical complex in Riyadh, Saudi Arabia. It is operated by the Ministry of National Guard Health Affairs. The complex developed from King Fahad National Guard Hospital, which opened in May 1983. In 2001, the National Guard Health Affairs reorganised its hospitals in Riyadh and Jeddah as King Absulaziz medical cities. King Fahad National Guard Hospital became part of the Riyadh-based King Abdulaziz medical city.

KAMC-Riyadh provides primary, secondary, and tertiary healthcare services and includes a number of specialist hospitals and medical centres.

It provides all types of care to all Saudi National Guard soldiers and their families. In 2012, it became a recognized center on the international level in conjoined twin separation surgery. It is the first center in the world with a 100% success rate in twin separation surgery.

== History ==
The National Guard hospital in Riyadh was established in 1981, inaugurated as King Fahad National Guard Hospital in 1983 and began operations in May of that year. National Guard Health Affairs (NGHA) assumed responsibility for the hospital in 1994 and began programmes of modernisation, development, and expansion. KAMC-Riyadh's IVF unit was established in October 1995. In 2001, NGHA converted its hospitals in Riyadh and Jeddah into medical cities, under the name King Abdulaziz Medical City, with King Fahad National Guard Hospital becoming part of King Abdulaziz Medical City in Riyadh. In the same year, the first phase of the King Abdulaziz Cardiac Center was commissioned, and KAMC-Riyadh's Department of Surgery initiated a trauma registry to support injury surveillance and prevention.

The Long Term and Extended Care Centre was established adjacent to KAMC-Riyadh in May 2002 for patients requiring extended care. The Sleep Disorders Centre was established in 2003.

In January 2004, the College of Medicine at King Saud bin Abdulaziz University for Health Sciences (KSAU-HS) was established and was integrated within KAMC-Riyadh, with the medical city serving as its principal teaching centre. In September of the same year, the IVF clinic underwent expansion and renovation; it was subsequently known as the Division of Reproductive Medicine. The Rehabilitation Department was also expanded in 2004 with both occupational therapy and physiotherapy units. Medical Imaging, Laboratory, Pharmacy, and patients' wards also underwent development and renovation.

In December 2006, KAMC-Riyadh met the requirements for accreditation under Joint Commission International (JCI) standards.

On 11 June 2011, NGHA inaugurated the Sheikh Sulaiman Al Rajhi Trauma Centre at KAMC-Riyadh, an expansion of the Cardiac Centre, and a blood bank building. The first phase of an expansion of the Emergency Care Centre opened in 2013, increasing capacity from 84 to 120 beds and adding adult and paediatric treatment areas.

King Abdullah Specialised Children's Hospital (KASCH) was opened in April 2015. It was formally inaugurated the following month by King Salman bin Abdulaziz Al Saud as part of a group of new medical facilities at KAMC-Riyadh including the Central Laboratory building and the King Abdullah International Medical Research Centre.

During June-August 2015, KAMC-Riyadh experienced an outbreak of Middle East respiratory syndrome coronavirus (MERS-CoV), which substantially disrupted hospital operations. On 18 August, the hospital was closed except for critical services. KAMC-Riyadh began resuming operations on 4 October 2015 following control of the outbreak and the completion of a development programme.

The Oncology and Haematology Centre was inaugrated on 5 January 2016. At its opening it included 40 outpatient clinics and 34 chemotherapy chairs.

The hospital is one of the centres used by the Saudi Conjoined Twins Program for conjoined-twin separation surgery.

== Facilities ==
KAMC-Riyadh comprises multiple hospitals and specialised medical centres, King Saud bin Abdulaziz University for Health Sciences, and a research centre. The complex provides inpatient, outpatient, primary, tertiary, and specialised clinical services.

=== Specialist hospitals and centres ===
King Abdullah Specialised Children's Hospital (KASCH), is a tertiary academic medical centre specialising in paediatric care. The adjacent Specialised Hospital for Women's Health is a 404-bed facility connected by a multi-storey bridge. Its services include obstetric, gynaecological, and neonatal care.

Other specialist facilities include the King Abdulaziz Cardiac Centre; a specialist 150-bed cardiac facility with 45 intensive care beds, and the Hepatobiliary Sciences and Organ Transplant Centre, which provides liver and organ transplant services. The medical city also includes the Oncology and Haematology Centre.

=== Emergency and critical care ===
KAMC-Riyadh meets Level I trauma centre criteria and its trauma facilities include the Sheikh Sulaiman Al Rajhi Trauma Centre, inaugurated in June 2011, and an Adult Burn Centre with intensive care beds, an operating room, and outpatient clinics.

The complex also has six adult intensive care units (ICUs), including a neurological ICU, trauma ICU, surgical ICU, medical ICU, progressive care ICU, and respiratory ICU.

=== Outpatient, primary and rehabilitative care ===
KAMC-Riyadh also provides dental and ambulatory (outpatient) care, long-term care/ rehabilitation, pharmaceutical care, and primary healthcare through a Riyadh network comprising four primary healthcare centres. The Long Term and Extended Care Centre provides care for patients requiring extended treatment.

KAMC-Riyadh also has accredited inpatient rehabilitation programmes, including an adult stroke specialty programme, and interdisciplinary rehabilitation programmes. The Sleep Disorders Centre provides in-laboratory polysomnography.

Other adult and paediatric services include: surgical and medical wards, obstetrics and gynaecology (including labor and delivery units, an IVF clinic, oncology, antenatal and postpartum wards); paediatric oncology; an Ambulatory Care Center; and a home health care program.

The medical city also contains operating facilities serving a range of specialties. The Ophthalmology Department serves both KAMC and KASCH and has three operating rooms in daily use, while dedicated orthopaedic operating rooms are assigned to adult orthopaedic, trauma, and spinal surgery.

=== Pharmaceutical care ===
The Department of Pharmaceutical Care operates a centralised pharmacy and 11 satellite pharmacies, seven serving inpatient areas and four serving outpatient areas. It also operates intravenous compounding facilities that prepare parenteral nutrition, chemotherapy, and other intravenous medications.

== Education and research ==
The medical city is associated with King Saud bin Abdulaziz University for Health Sciences and includes the Colleges of Medicine and Nursing.

The wider Riyadh complex also includes the King Abdullah International Medical Research Centre (KAIMRC). Its research infrastructure includes the Saudi Biobank, and DNA and cord-blood bank facilities.

== See also ==
- List of hospitals in Saudi Arabia
- List of things named after Saudi kings
- National Guard Health Affairs
- King Saud bin Abdulaziz University for Health Sciences
