= Abdullah bin Ibrahim Al-Saleh =

Saudi Arabian central bank executive

- Education: Bachelor's & Master's Degree from King Saud University
- Occupation: Deputy Governor for Digital Transformation at Saudi Central Bank
- Employer: Saudi Central Bank
- Known for: Extensive notable works in Saudi Ministry of Commerce
- Board member of: SAPTCO, King Abdullah City for Atomic and Renewable Energy
- Awards: Government Excellence Award in the Arab World (2020), Institutional Excellence Recognition Award (2020)
- Website: https://www.linkedin.com/in/abalsaleh/

Abdullah bin Ibrahim Al-Saleh is a Saudi Arabian deputy governor for digital transformation at Saudi Central Bank who is known for his extensive contributions to Saudi Ministry of Commerce in many positions including assistant deputy minister for commercial services affair, alongside being an initiative executive owner of both the Saudi Authority for Intellectual Property in 2018 and Saudi Center for Economic Business in 2019.

Al-Saleh has participated in the fields of e-commerce, data management, and process engineering under the patronage of many initiatives that won local and regional prizes.

Al-Saleh also holds a PMP diploma since 2016 from PMI.

== Education ==
Al-Saleh graduated from high school with honors among 100 best graduates in high school across Saudi Arabia in the science field. He also pursued a bachelor's degree from the College of Sciences in King Saud University and a master's degree in information systems from the same university in 2013. Al-Saleh also pursued a number of certifications and training programs including:

- Executive Education at Cambridge Judge Business School
- People, Culture, and Performance: Strategies from Silicon Valley, Stanford University
- High Performance Skills Program (HPPS), London Business School
- PMP Diploma from Project Management Institute in 2016
- Executive Certification in Management and Leadership via MIT Sloan Executive Education in 2015

== Career ==
- Deputy governor for digital transformation at Saudi Central Bank (2024–present)
- Assistant deputy ministry for commercial services affair at Ministry of Commerce (2022–2024)
- Initiative Executive Owner of Saudi Authority for Intellectual Property and Saudi Center for Economic Business (2017–2018)
- Portfolio Manager at THIQAH Business Services (2015–2017)
- Business/System Analyst and Project Management Team Leader in Sultan Bin Abdulaziz Humanitarian City at with MeduNet (2008–2012)

=== Awards ===
Al-Saleh is also known to have contributed to many initiatives which received numerous local and regional awards. In 2020, the Saudi Ministry of Commerce won government excellence award as the best ministry of out of 5000+ Arab government entries in the Arab World, presented by Arab League. Additionally, in the following year, the same ministry achieved institutional excellence recognition award as the first government entity to grant the same certificate with a (4-star) rating from the European Organisation for Quality Management (EFQM). There is also the achievement award for electronic transactions from the Electronic Government Transactions Program (Yesser) of the Ministry of Commerce for the “Establish Your Company” service (2018).

Furthermore, Al-Saleh achieved:

- Government Excellence Award in the Arab World for the best electronic service (Establish your company) in 2020
- Two Saudi Ministry of Commerce GOV Information Technology Awards
- First Place Award for Digital Excellence at King Saud University, organized by the Ministry of Communications and Information Technology (2008).

=== Forums ===
Al-Saleh was as well a speaker in numerous occasions; in 2014, he was a speaker at the Saudi Intellectual Property Forum at King Abdulaziz City for Science and Technology. He also spoke at the Communications and Information Technology Forum presented by the commission with the same name in 2017, as well as the Eastern Trade Forum "The Future of E-Commerce at the Eastern Chamber of Commerce in 2019.

== Memberships ==
- Board Member at (SAPTCO)
- Board Member at King Abdullah City for Atomic and Renewable Energy (2019–2024)
- Board member at E-Commerce Council (2022–2024)

== See also ==
- Majid bin Abdullah Al Qasabi
