= Saudi Press Agency =

Official government news agency of Saudi Arabia

- وكالة الأنباء السعودية; SPA واس

Agency overview
- Formed: 1970; 56 years ago
- Jurisdiction: Government of Saudi Arabia
- Headquarters: Riyadh, Saudi Arabia
- Agency executive: Dr. Fahd bin Hassan Al Aqran, President
- Parent agency: Ministry of Media
- Website: www.spa.gov.sa

The Saudi Press Agency (SPA; Arabic: وكالة الأنباء السعودية) is the state news agency of Saudi Arabia, and is headquartered in the capital, Riyadh. It was established in 1971 under King Faisal bin Abdulaziz.

== History and profile ==
The agency was established in 1971 as the first national news agency in Saudi Arabia in response to the need for an official media platform due to a limited number of news outlets at the time. The agency is also the first news agency in the Arabian Gulf region. The Saudi government stated that the agency's purpose was to serve as a central body to collect and distribute local and international news.

In 2012, it was announced that the SPA would become an independent body as part of a government restructuring. The agency is a founding member of the Federation of Arab News Agencies (FANA), the Union of OIC News Agencies (formerly known as the International Islamic News Agency), and the Non-Aligned Movement (NAM). The Agency publishes news in Arabic, English, French, Chinese, Russian and Persian.

In late May 2012, the Cabinet separated Saudi Television and Radio and the Saudi Press Agency (SPA) from the Ministry of Media, establishing both as independent corporations.

Under the May 2012 restructuring, Abdullah bin Fahd Al-Hussein was designated as the president of the SPA, with the Minister of Media acting as the board chairman of the agency.

=== Activities ===
The agency organized the fourth News Agencies World Congress (NAWC) in Riyadh in 2013.

=== SPA Academy for News Training ===
The Saudi Press Agency announced in February 2024 its first news training academy, SPA Academy for News Training. According to the SPA, the academy aims to develop professional skills in journalism, support market needs, and promote the transfer of knowledge, technology, and modern tools for news production. The SPA stated that the first phase of the academy included signing cooperation agreements with several local and international organizations, including the Technical and Vocational Training Corporation, the Prince Mohammad bin Salman College of Business and Entrepreneurship, the Saudi Data and Artificial Intelligence Authority (SDAIA), King Abdulaziz University, the National Center for E-Learning, and Microsoft.

In October 2024, Minister of Media Salman bin Yousif Al Dossary inaugurated the SPA Academy for News Training at the Saudi Press Agency Building in Riyadh.

In August 2025, the SPA Academy for News Training announced the launch of the first phase of its four-stage program, the Media Leaders Track, held in Switzerland in collaboration with EHL Hospitality Business School.

=== Saudi Photo Platform ===
The Minister of Media, Salman bin Yousif Al Dossary, announced the launch of the Saudi Photo Platform at the second edition of the Hajj Media Forum in June 2025. The digital initiative was designed to offer public access to SPA's collection of images and make them available for reuse under the Creative Commons Attribution-ShareAlike 4.0 License.

=== Scientific portal ===
In September 2022, the Saudi Press Agency announced the launch of a portal for scientific research and related news. SPA described the platform as its first initiative at a national level focused on scientific content.

SPA then-President Fahd bin Hassan Al Aqran stated that the portal was created to diversify the agency's coverage and provide a "media window" on research and innovation in Saudi Arabia. According to the SPA, the portal supports the objectives of Saudi Vision 2030 related to developing a knowledge-based economy and strengthening research institutions.

Also in September 2022, the King Abdullah University of Science and Technology (KAUST) was announced as the first scientific partner of the portal.

== See also ==
- Media in Saudi Arabia
- Ministry of Media
- Al Ekhbariya
- Federation of Arab News Agencies (FANA)
