= Ajel =

Online newspaper in Saudi Arabia

- Owner: Ejaz Electronic Publishing Company
- Editor-in-chief: Sultan Al-Maliki
- Language: Arabic
- Country: Saudi Arabia
- Website: ajel.sa

Ajel is an electronic newspaper in Saudi Arabia. It was established in 2007 and has a license from the Saudi Ministry of Culture and Information. The electronic newspaper is ranked second among Saudi news sites in terms of the number of visits, according to the global site statistics from Alexa.

The Ajel print newspaper launched on 8 November 2018. It has a new identity that includes a complete change in the design of its website and its editorial sections, with a complete update of its smartphone applications.
