= GCC Patent Office =

Regional patent office based in Riyadh, Saudi Arabia

The GCC Patent Office (GCCPO) is a regional patent office based in Riyadh, Saudi Arabia, within the Secretariat General of the Gulf Cooperation Council (GCC). The GCC consists of six member countries: Bahrain, Kuwait, Oman, Qatar, Saudi Arabia, and the United Arab Emirates (UAE). In 2013, it employed about 30 patent examiners.

The GCCPO was established under the GCC Patent Regulation, which was approved by the Supreme Council of the GCC in its 13th session held in Abu Dhabi, from 21-23 December 1992. The office began accepting applications on 3 October 1998, with the first patent granted in 2002. The patent system was amended in the Supreme Council's 20th session held in Riyadh, from 27-29 November 1999. It was amended to conform to the Trade Related Intellectual Property Rights agreement (TRIPS) within the World Trade Organization (WTO) framework of agreements.

The GCCPO played a role in "encouraging and supporting innovation, creativity and invention" within the GCC. Upon securing patent protection, inventors would find it easier to develop or commercialize their technology across the region.

As of 5 January 2021, the GCCPO has stopped accepting new applications, although it will begin processing them again after amending the Patent Regulation.

== Organizing structure ==
The GCCPO consists of a board of directors and an executive body. The office is managed by the board of directors, which consists of a competent representative from each member state whose rank is not lower than that of an undersecretary. The board of directors is chaired by one of its members for a period of one year in rotation.

== Patent protection ==
The GCCPO receives and examines patent applications in the GCC. Once a patent is granted through the office, it is valid in all six member countries. A patent granted in any of the member countries also has the same protection as one granted through the GCCPO or the international Patent Cooperation Treaty (PCT).

Saudi Arabia approved the GCC Patents of Inventions Regulation of 2001, an amendment of a 1992 statute, by Royal Decree No. M/28 of 2001. This permits the registration of patents throughout the GCC. The GCCPO is a separate office from the Saudi Patent Office (SPO), although it is based in Riyadh.

The GCC is neither a part of the Patent Cooperation Treaty (PCT) nor of the Paris Convention for the Protection of Industrial Property, although it works in accordance with the specified terms.

== Filing requirements ==
In accordance with patent law, a patent has to meet certain requirements, namely novelty, inventiveness, and industrial applicability.

=== Required documents ===
The requirements for filing a GCC patent application, which mirror that of the SPO, are as follows:

- Documents that must be filed along with the application:
1. Specifications, claims, drawings (if any) and an abstract of the invention in Arabic, or in English with Arabic translation
- Documents that may be filed belatedly within 90 days from the filing date: (Items 1, 2 & 3 should be legalized at any one of the GCC States' Consulates)
1. A power of attorney from the applicant
2. An extract from the commercial register or a certified copy of the certificate of incorporation of the applicant if the applicant is a corporate body
3. A deed of assignment, if the applicant is not the inventor
4. A certified copy of the priority document, if the applicant is claiming priority on the basis of a foreign application

== Application steps ==
Upon receiving the application, the GCCPO carries out a formal examination, then a substantive examination. If the application does not meet patentability requirements, the office provides an objection, and the applicant has 90 days to reply with counter-arguments or comply, or the application is deemed lapsed. The examination is carried out by either the Australian, Austrian, Swedish, or Chinese Patent Office. The office had streamlined the examination procedures and granted some applications in as little as 18 months.

If the claimed invention is patentable, the applicant proceeds to pay the grant and publication fees.

The letters patent is issued and the decision to grant the patent is published in the Patent Gazette for opposition purposes. Oppositions may be filed before the Board of Grievances within 90 days from the date of publication.

== Filing provisions ==
=== Fees ===
The GCC official filing fees are generally higher than those of national offices. However, applicants utilize a unified filing process and only pay one set of annuity fees, reducing long-term costs and making it more cost-effective than filing six separate national applications. The patent maintenance fee is due annually, payable the first 3 months of every calendar year following the year the patent application was filed. Late payments come with a surcharge after a 3-month grace period has passed.

=== Priority date & dual applications ===
A GCC patent application cannot coexist with a national patent application in any of the GCC member countries. A national application must be cancelled within 90 days of filing through the GCCPO. However, it is still possible to file an application in a member country and seek convention protection by filing at the GCCPO at the same time. This allows an individual to retain the priority date from the basic application in the member state or a foreign country. The application through the GCCPO needs to be filed within 12 months of the filing the basic application.

=== Term of protection ===
The term of protection for a GCC patent is 20 years from the filing date. However, the patent has to be worked for the protection to be active. If the patent is not being fully exploited within 4 years from filing date, or 3 years from grant date, the patent will be subject to compulsory licensing under the provisions of the law.

== 41st Session (2021) ==
In the Supreme Council's 41st Session held in Al-Ula on 5 January 2021, the GCCPO stopped accepting the general filing of patent applications. The office will receive, process, and grant patents only upon receiving a request from a GCC member state.
