= Copyright law of Saudi Arabia =

Saudi copyright law was issued as per Royal Decree No. M/41 dated August 30, 2003. The Saudi copyright protects all of the intellectual works of any type, and the author rights will be protected until a period of 50 years after his/her death.

== See also ==
- Saudi Authority for Intellectual Property
- Saudi Patent Office
