= Majid bin Abdullah Al Qasabi =

Saudi Arabian politician (born 1960)

His Excellency Majid bin Abdullah Al Qasabi
- ماجد بن عبدالله القصبي
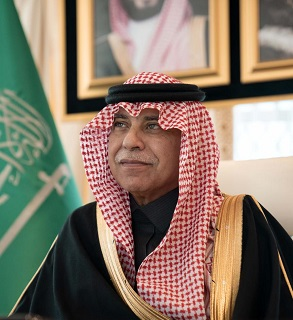
- Al Qasabi in 2022

Minister of Commerce
- Incumbent
- Assumed office 25 February 2020
- Monarch: Salman
- Prime Minister: Salman (2020–2022); Mohammad bin Salman (2022–present)
- Preceded by: Turki Al-Shabanah

Personal details
- Born: 1960 (age 65–66) Jeddah, Saudi Arabia

Majid bin Abdullah bin Osman Al Qasabi (Arabic: ماجد بن عبد الله بن عثمان القصبي; born January 24, 1960) is the Saudi Arabian Minister of Commerce, having held the position since May 2016. He also served as the Acting Minister of Media from February 25, 2020 to March 5, 2023 and is a member of the Council for Economic and Development Affairs. Al Qasabi has held several prominent roles throughout his career, including serving as an advisor at the Crown Prince's court from 2010 to 2011, as the head of special affairs for the Crown Prince from 2011 to 2014, and again as an advisor in the Crown Prince's court in 2014.

Since 2015, Al-Qasabi has led four ministries, starting with the Ministry of Social Affairs, followed by the Ministry of Commerce and Investment (currently the Ministry of Commerce) in 2016. He was also tasked with overseeing the Ministry of Municipal and Rural Affairs (now the Ministry of Municipalities and Housing) from December 2018 until February 2020, in addition to his role at the Ministry of Commerce. In February 2020, he was appointed as the Acting Minister of Media, a position he held until March 2023.

== Early life and education ==
Majid Bin Abdullah Al Qasabi was born in Jeddah in 1959. His father Abdullah bin Othman Al Qasabi was a prominent Saudi real estate owner and businessman.

Majid Al Qasabi pursued his university education in the US, receiving a bachelor's degree in civil engineering in 1981 from the University of Portland. In 1982, he obtained a master's degree in civil engineering from U.C. Berkeley, followed by another master's degree in engineering management, and a PhD in engineering management from the University of Missouri–Rolla (now Missouri University of Science and Technology), obtained in 1985.

Al Qasabi taught between 1987 and 1998 as an assistant professor as the King Abdulaziz University, in the Industrial Engineering Department.

== Career ==
In 1998, Al Qasabi left the King Abdulaziz University to become Secretary General of the Jeddah Chamber of Commerce & Industry, a role which he held until 2002.

In 2002, he served as director-general of the Sultan bin Abdulaziz Al Saud Foundation and became an advisor at the Crown Prince's Court in 2010, and president of Special Affairs for Crown Prince Sultan and his two successors between 2011 and 2014.

Al Qasabi was named minister of social affairs of Saudi Arabia by royal decree on 29 January 2015. Within the first 100 days of his appointment, a center for studies and research called Nama (growth in Arabic) was set up in Riyadh, to follow up on all initiatives carried out by the Ministry of Social Affairs.

=== Acting minister of media ===
He was appointed by royal decree on 25 February 2020 as acting minister of media replacing Turki Al Shabana in the post.

=== Minister of commerce and investment ===
Al Qasabi was appointed as minister of commerce and investment on 7 May 2016 via royal decree, replacing Tawfig Al Rabiah in the post.

Leading the ministry, Al Qasabi is in charge of implementing structural reform in line with Saudi Arabia's national plan Vision 2030. Accordingly, the nation's foreign investment license provider, The Saudi Arabian General Investment Authority (SAGIA) was built into the ministry of commerce and investment.

In 2016, the General Authority for Small and Medium Enterprises was established, and held its first board of directors' meeting in November 2016. The authority was established by the Council of Ministers and headed by Al Qasabi.

Under his leadership, Saudi Arabia allowed full ownership by foreign investors in firms belonging to the health and education sectors in the country, as well as the engineering services companies.

=== Other responsibilities ===
- Member of the boards of several major Saudi charities
- Member of the Council of the Saudi Ports Authority Management
- Member of the High Commission for the Development of Ha’il
- Member of the Centennial Fund
- Member of the Council of Economic and Development Affairs (Saudi Arabia)
