= Al-Akhbariya =

Al-Akhbariya may refer to:

- Syrian News Channel
- Al Ekhbariya (Arabic: الإخبارية), a Saudi news and current affairs satellite TV channel

== See also ==
- Akhbari, a minority school of Twelver Shia Islam
