= Awwad Alawwad =

Saudi politician

His Excellency Awwad Alawwad
- عواد العواد
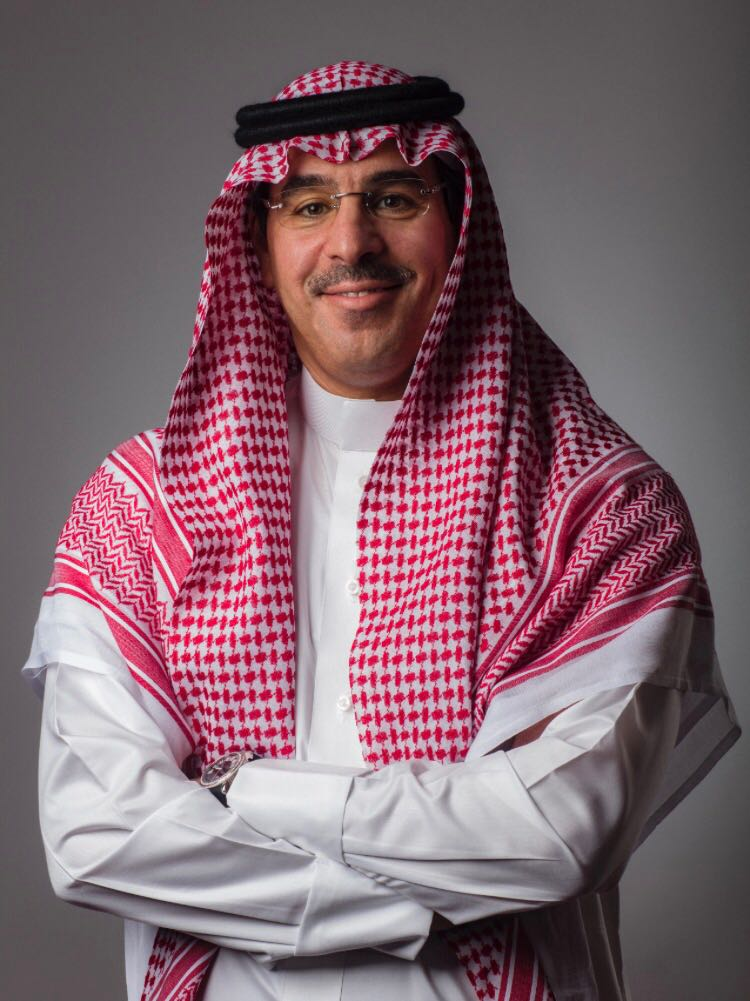

Minister of Culture and Information
- In office 22 April 2017 – 27 December 2018
- Prime Minister: Salman bin Abdulaziz Al Saud

Personal details
- Born: 11 April 1972 (age 54) Riyadh, Saudi Arabia
- Education: Warwick University
- Occupation: Minister of Culture and Information

Awwad S. Alawwad (Arabic: عواد العواد; born 11 April 1972) is a Saudi politician and senior government official. He served as Minister of Culture and Information from April 2017 to December 2018, and as Ambassador to Germany from 2015 to 2017. In August 2019, he was appointed by royal decree as President of the Saudi Human Rights Commission, with the rank of minister — a post he held until September 2022. He currently serves as an Advisor to the Royal Court of Saudi Arabia.

== Education and personal life ==
Alawwad earned a Bachelor of Law from King Saud University in Riyadh in 1993, followed by an MA in Banking Law from Boston University School of Law in 1996. He was awarded his PhD in Financial Market Law from the University of Warwick in 2000.

In 2005, Alawwad was selected as an Eisenhower Fellow. He has published academic articles on investment and economic policy and served on the advisory board of the Saudi Economic Journal. Alawwad has also completed executive education programmes at Harvard University and Cranfield University, as well as the Singapore Government Economic Development Program, among other internationally accredited institutions.

He is married with three children and resides with his family in Riyadh.

== Political career ==
=== Chair of the National Committee to Combat Human Trafficking ===
From 2019 to 2022, Alawwad served as Chair of the Saudi National Committee to Combat Human Trafficking (NCCHT), a cross-government body established to coordinate the Kingdom’s national anti-trafficking response.

During this period, comprehensive reforms were implemented to align Saudi Arabia’s legislative and enforcement frameworks with international standards. These efforts contributed to a marked improvement in the Kingdom’s ranking in the U.S. State Department’s annual Trafficking in Persons (TIP) Report. At the start of his tenure, Saudi Arabia was ranked in Tier 3: the report’s lowest category. Saudi Arabia subsequently advanced to the Tier 2 Watch List status (an interim designation between Tiers 3 and 2) and was ultimately elevated to full Tier 2 by 2022. The advancement signalled meaningful progress and demonstrated the Kingdom’s sustained efforts to eliminate trafficking. The 2022 TIP Report cited Saudi Arabia’s “serious and sustained efforts,” and international organisations including the International Organization for Migration (IOM) and the United Nations Office on Drugs and Crime (UNODC) publicly acknowged improvements to the Kingdom’s legal and institutional framework.

A nationwide campaign was launched to raise awareness of trafficking risks, victims’ rights, and reporting mechanisms. This was supported by digital outreach and training for diplomats, consular officials, and rehabilitation professionals. The period also saw Saudi Arabia signing a renewed cooperation agreement with the IOM to strengthen victim protection, referral systems, and enforcement coordination. Saudi Arabia also worked closely with the UNODC to develop anti-trafficking legislation and virtual training modules.

Describing human trafficking as a “heinous crime” Alawwad called for stronger enforcement, interagency coordination, and cross-border cooperation. He hosted the 2021 Middle East Forum on the Challenges of Combating Human Trafficking, which brought together international experts and officials to share best practices.

Despite challenges posed by the COVID-19 pandemic, the NCCHT continued to implement reforms, including establishing a National Referral Mechanism and enhancing protections for migrant workers.

His tenure in this position attracted positive assessments from regional and international observers, with legal journals documenting the legislative progress made. The NCCHT was positioned as a national coordination hub and diplomatic platform to engage with international partners.

=== Minister of Culture and Information ===
Alawwad served as Saudi Arabia's Minister of Culture and Information from April 2017 to December 2018. His tenure coincided with the early implementation phase of Saudi Arabia's Vision 2030, a national strategy launched in 2016 to diversify the economy and modernise various sectors, including culture and media. Significant reforms aligned with Vision 2030 were implemented, focusing on modernising the cultural and media sectors, expanding international engagement, and enhancing government communication.

In July 2017, a Supreme Committee was established to oversee the comprehensive development of the Saudi Broadcasting Corporation’s television and radio services. The committee's objectives encompassed improving content quality, upgrading broadcasting infrastructure and media facilities, implementing specialised training programmes to enhance the skills of media personnel, and attracting qualified Saudi talent to strengthen the domestic media workforce.

The Ministry of Culture and Information announced the Centre for International Communication (CIC) in August 2017. At the launch event, Alawwad said that the CIC was established “to enhance intercommunication, integration and coordination among government authorities and different media outlets to keep pace with the latest developments and comprehensive progress being made in the Kingdom”. The Centre was tasked with unifying government messaging, managing local media campaigns, and providing accurate information to international audiences about Saudi Arabia's policies and initiatives.

In late 2017, Alawwad approved the executive regulations governing electronic publishing activities in Saudi Arabia. These regulations outlined the licensing mechanisms for various forms of digital media, including newspapers, websites, and online news accounts, aiming to formalise and support the growing digital media landscape. Alawwad has acknowledged the role of online media in presenting an accurate image of the Kingdom and contributing to the goals of Vision 2030.

In December 2017, the government lifted a 35-year ban on public cinemas, assigning the ministry of culture and information the responsibility of supervising the licensing of commercial movie theatres. The first screening was of Marvel's superhero movie Black Panther in April 2018. This policy shift was described by Alawwad as a “watershed moment" in the development of the cultural economy, aiming to stimulate economic growth and diversify entertainment options within the Kingdom.

A strategic consolidation of several major television channels was undertaken in May 2018 to unify key programming under the newly created channel SBC as the “entertainment flagship” for the Saudi Broadcasting Corporation, offering a diverse range of entertainment, sports, and drama programming, including Saudi and Arab series. This restructuring aimed to streamline operations, enhance content quality, and improve operational efficiency. The launch of the channel marked a significant shift towards modernising the media landscape, with a focus on appealing to younger audiences. The consolidation also contributed to a notable increase in advertising revenue, reflecting the channel’s growing reach and appeal. As part of the broader efforts to modernise the Kingdom's media landscape, the transformation of Al-Ekhbariya, previously a government-run television channel, into a limited liability company renamed the Ekhbariya Network Company was completed. This restructuring aimed to improve operational efficiency, enable greater editorial independence, and foster innovation within the channel’s programming and management, reflecting wider reforms across Saudi Arabia’s media sector under Vision 2030.

Other actions taken during Awwad's tenure as Minister include the establishment of a permanent media centre in Jazan, near Saudi Arabia's southern border, to support media liaison and facilitate visits with military personnel. Additionally, the General Authority for Culture was directed to supervise all cultural centres in the Kingdom to standardise activities, events, and programmes across these centres, ensuring alignment with national cultural objectives and enhancing the quality of cultural offerings.

=== Ambassador to Germany ===
Alawwad served as Saudi Arabia's Ambassador to Germany from October 2015 to April 2017. His appointment came at a time of expanding strategic and economic ties between Saudi Arabia and Germany, as both governments sought to deepen cooperation across trade, investment, and energy.

During his tenure bilateral dialogue was strengthened with increased communication between Riyadh and Berlin. Alawwad oversaw several high-level exchanges between Saudi and German officials and advanced economic diplomacy by facilitating business and trade delegations. He emphasised opportunities for German private sector investment in the Kingdom’s diversifying economy, particularly in the renewable energy, infrastructure, and technology sectors.

His tenure also coincided with Germany’s growing interest in the Gulf region, providing an important platform to position Saudi Arabia as a strategic partner in Europe. At the 86th Saudi National Day reception in Berlin, he hosted senior dignitaries and highlighted more than 80 years of Saudi–German industrial cooperation, including unveiling of Siemens’ first locally manufactured gas turbine under the Vision 2030 energy initiative.

Alawwad concluded his service in Berlin in April 2017, when he was appointed Minister of Culture and Information by Royal Decree. His successor as Ambassador to Germany was His Royal Highness Prince Khalid bin Bandar Al Saud.

=== Other governmental roles ===
Dr. Alawwad previously served as an adviser for economic and financial affairs in the Office of the Crown Prince (2013), as a consultant for the Governor of Riyadh and as Vice Governor for Investment Affairs at Saudi Arabian General Investment Authority – SAGIA (2003).

During his tenure, SAGIA established a more liberal ecosystem for investment in Saudi Arabia. It implemented the Investment Environment Obstacles Program, designed to identify and resolve barriers to foreign investment, and promote an open and transparent environment in business within the Kingdom. Dr. Alawwad was responsible for establishing the National Competitiveness Centre, which spearheaded the national ‘10 by 10’ program to establish Saudi Arabia as one of the Top 10 most competitive economies globally.

As part of these efforts, Alawwad chaired the Saudi negotiation team for bilateral investment treaties and was acting leader of the Saudi team overseeing disputes elevated to the WTO. Furthermore, he represented Saudi Arabia on the OECD-MENA Committee on Investment and Arab Investment Promotion Association. He was the deputy chief of the joint Swiss-Saudi commission and Russian-Saudi commission.

Alawwad was also appointed as the chairman of the board of The National Center for Performance Measurement "Adaa" in 2020. Adaa, an independent government entity, is established to measure the performance of public entities in Saudi Arabia to help achieve the kingdom's Vision 2030.

Alawwad's first job in the government was at the Saudi Arabian Monetary Authority (SAMA) where he was head of financial studies and banking supervision at the Banking Institute.

He also served as a Member of the Saudi Government's Anti-Trust Committee, The Commission for Resolution of Commercial Papers Disputes (United States/Saudi Arabia strategic dialogue), The Saudi American Investment and Trade Board, the regional Arab Investment Authorities Committee and the Arab Investment Court.

=== Agnes Callamard Accusations ===
In 2020, Alawwad was uncovered as allegedly having twice threatened the life of outgoing United Nations investigator Agnes Callamard who told The Guardian on that a senior Saudi official had threatened to have her "taken care of" at a "high-level" meeting if she wasn't kept in check following her damning findings into MBS direct connection to the murder of Khashoggi. The UN later confirmed to Reuters on Wednesday that Callamard's remarks were accurate.

Alawwad has denied the allegations and has stated that he rejects "this suggestion in the strongest terms" and that he never "would have desired or threatened any harm upon a UN-appointed individual or anyone in that matter". He added: "I am disheartened that anything I have said could be interpreted as a threat".
