= Sofana R. Dahlan =

Saudi Arabian lawyer

Sofana R. Dahlan (سفانة ربيع دحلان) is a Saudi lawyer and social entrepreneur. She was one of the first women licensed to practice law in Saudi Arabia and has worked in law and banking in Lebanon and Kuwait. In 2017, Dahlan was also the Vice Governor for Entrepreneurship Advancement at the Small and Medium Enterprises General Authority of Saudi Arabia.

== Early life and education ==
Sofana R. Dahlan was born to the Al Dahlan (آل دحلان) family of Makkah. Her mother, Huda Kayal, was an academic specialising in English Literature at King Abdulaziz University in Jeddah and her father, Dr. Rabea S. Dahlan, served as Deputy Governor of the Emirate of Makkah from 1989 until 1999.

She has completed an undergraduate degree in Law (LLB) from Cairo University, a postgraduate degree in Islamic Law from the Higher Institute of Islamic Studies in Egypt along with an MBA degree from the American University of Technology. She studied in Egypt because law was not then offered to women at Saudi universities. In 2009, she was involved in the Harvard Executive program "Leading for the Future: The Arab Region in a Changing World" and has also obtained an executive degree in Global Leadership & Public Policy from Harvard University in 2013.

== Career ==
Dahlan is the founder of many social enterprises that focus on developing the creative industries in the region. She is the founder of Tashkeil, a Saudi-based social enterprise that incubates, accelerates and promotes creative entrepreneurs. She is also the founder of Kayan Space and Studios – a membership-based environment for creative professionals, entrepreneurs and freelancers.

In 2013, Dahlan initiated, the Saudi National Creative Initiative (SNCI) which is a collaborative creative knowledge transfer platform that was established in 2013. Stimulated profoundly by Dahlan's passion for working with youth and the Saudi Vision 2030, SNCI aims to map and understand the Saudi Creative Industry in order to reinforce creativity and utilize the youth to unleash its full potential and drive Saudi Arabia to a knowledge-based economy.

== Philanthropy ==
Dahlan has spoken and written on women's rights and the creative economy. She is an active member of the Board of Directors at Khadija Bint Khuwailid Centre, a businesswoman and lobbying center at the Jeddah Chamber of Commerce and Industry. She has spoken at public platforms such as Pecha Kucha in Beirut, Beirut Design Week, TEDxWomen in Barcelona, and BOLDtalks Woman and has penned numerous articles on topics such as women's rights, social values, and inter-religious dialogue.

== Notable accolades ==
- In 2011, she was chosen to participate at the Harvard Executive program - 'Leading for the Future: The Arab Region in a Changing World' where she represented her founding company, Tashkeil, socioeconomic cycle as an ecosystem for social change and development.
- In 2011, she became the first Saudi to serve as a fellow of the United Nations Alliance of Civilizations (UNAOC) on a tour of Europe and the U.S.
- In 2014, she was the recipient of the "Most Innovative Woman Entrepreneur" for WIL Achievement Awards.
- In 2015, she was recognised as WEF Young Global Leader.
- In 2015, she was the recipient of "Female Entrepreneur of the Year" for Arab Women Awards.
- In 2015, she received a Silver Stevies Award for "Female Entrepreneur of the Year (in MENA and Europe)" whilst under her direction, Tashkeil received a Bronze Stevies Award for the "Most Innovative Company of the Year" category. She was also recognised as "Female Entrepreneur of the Year" by Arab Women Awards.
- In 2018, she was the recipient of "Leadership Excellence in Social Entrepreneurship" for the 8th Global Leadership Awards.
