= Libraries in Saudi Arabia =

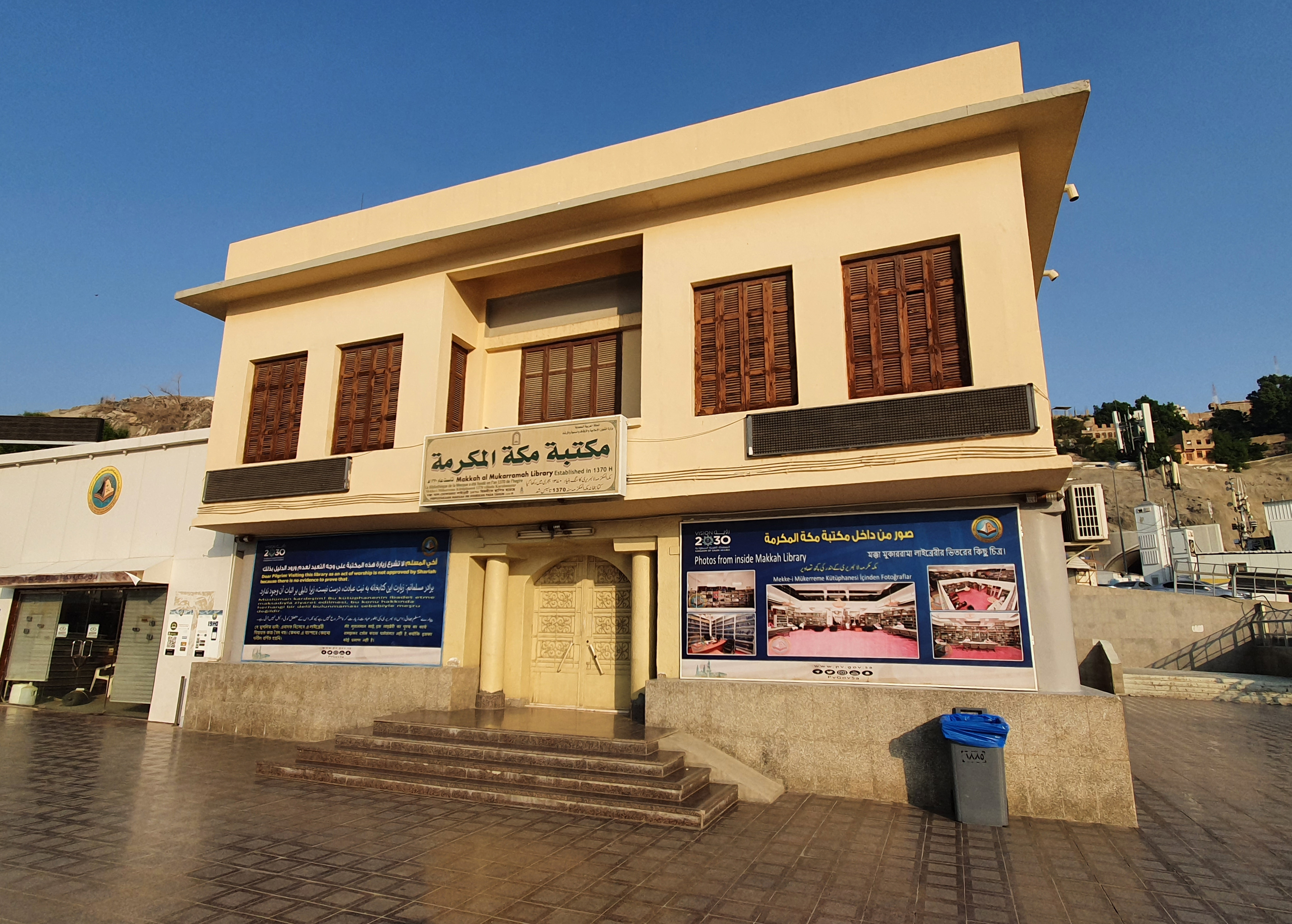
Makkah Al Mukarramah Library

Libraries in Saudi Arabia have always been a critical component of Saudi culture and society. They have been prevalent in various forms in palaces, mosques, and schools for over a century and a half. Although older libraries differ from their modern counterparts, they played a pivotal role in facilitating cultural and intellectual movements and benefitting scholarships and scholars more broadly.

Endowed libraries, especially those in the Two Holy Mosques in Makkah and Al-Madinah, are among the oldest and the most important in the Kingdom. The provenance of the Great Mosque of Makkah library for example, dates back to 161 AH. It acquired the name "Library of Al Masjid Al Haram" during the reign of King Abdulaziz.

Libraries spread throughout the Najd region due in part to the sizable number of Islamic and other books imported from Iraq, the Levant, Morocco and Yemen. As many historians have noted, many of those books were moved to Riyadh after the death of King Abdulaziz. This transfer not only benefitted the large number of students there, but also directly contributed to the growth of private libraries in Riyadh. These included the Sheikh Abdullah bin Abdul Latif Al Sheikh Library, which housed an impressive collection of manuscripts, and the Sheikh Hamad bin Faris Library, among others.

== Emergence of the modern library ==
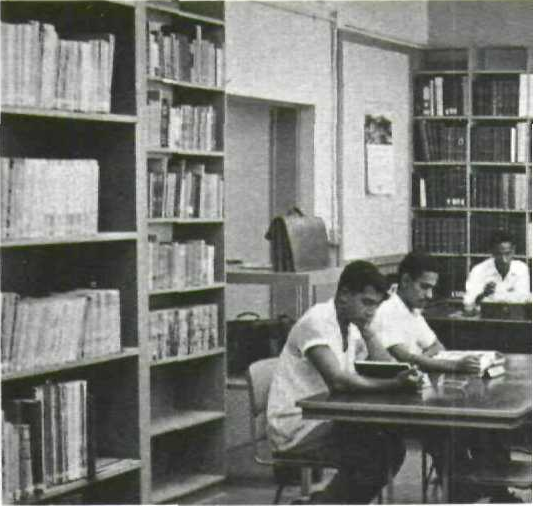
Library in Dhahran, circa 1960.

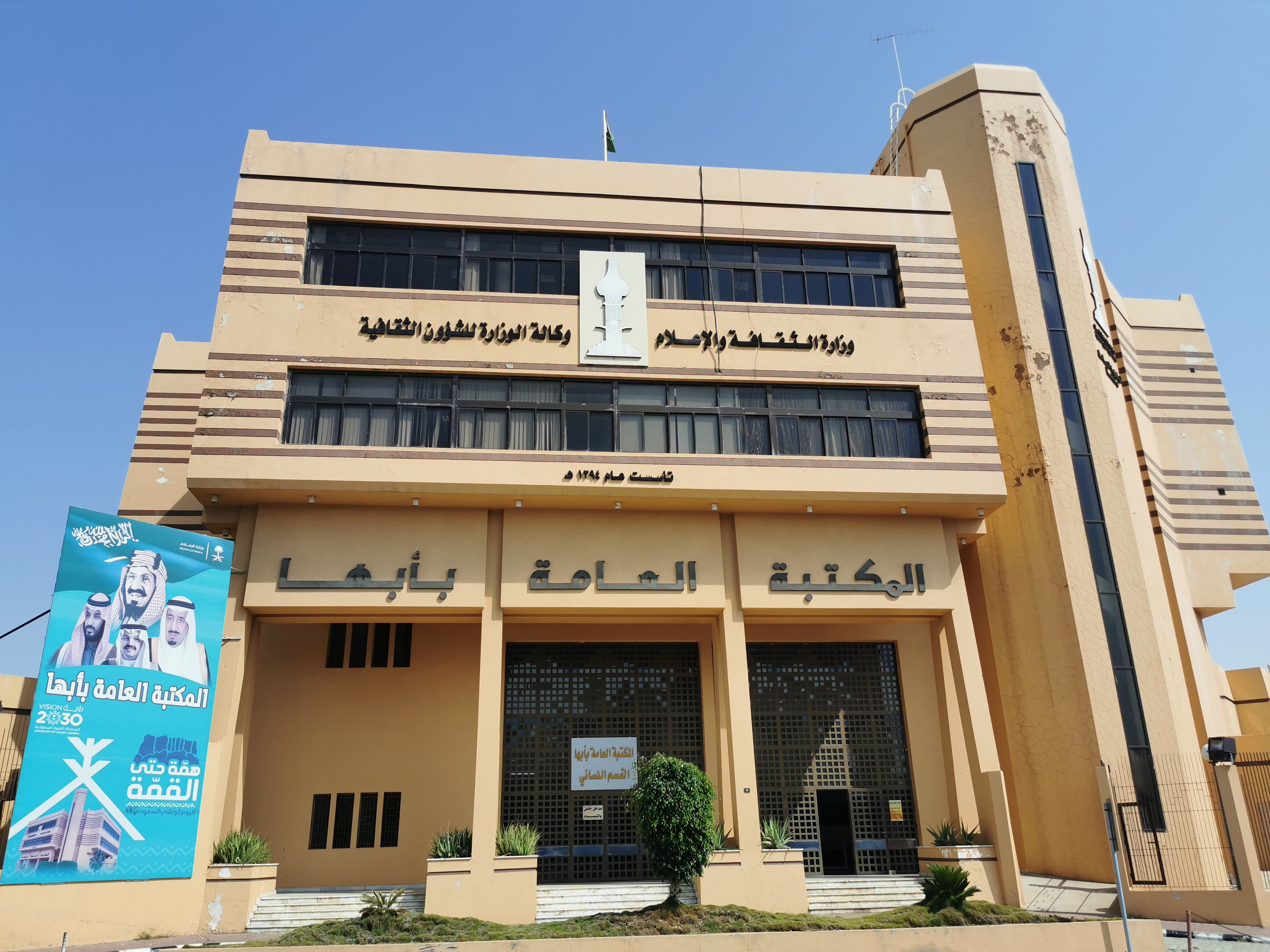
Public library of Abha opened in circa 1974

In the decades ensuing the Kingdom's establishment, its libraries sought to bring themselves into line with modern notions of how such institutions work with respect to organization, equipment, and specialized services. These efforts not only preserved and developed existing collections but led to the opening of various new libraries, especially public libraries, throughout the Kingdom.

The most prominent public libraries during the reign of King Abdulaziz (1932–1953) were:

- The Public library of Dhahran (est. 1347 AH).
- The Maktabat Al-Haram Al-Madani (est. 1352 AH), located inside Al-Haram Al-Madani, historically overseen by the Ministry of Hajj and Endowments and currently overseen by the General Presidency for the Affairs of the Great Mosque and the Prophet's Mosque.
- Prince Musaid bin Abdul Rahman Library (est. 1364 AH)
- Makkah Al-Mukarramah Library, formally established by Sheikh Abbas Suleiman Qattan in 1370 AH after he purchased and donated the Al-Kurdi collection.
- Shaqra Public Library (est. 1371 AH).
- Unayzah Public Library (est. 1372 AH).
- The Riyadh Saudi Library, established in 1373 AH on the recommendation of the Grand Mufti of Saudi Arabia, Sheikh Muhammad bin Ibrahim Al Al-Sheikh, historically overseen by the Mufti, then the House of Ifta, and currently overseen by the leadership of the Department of Academic Research and Ifta.

During the reign of King Saud, the General Administration for Libraries at the Ministry of Education was established after Cabinet Resolution No. 30 was issued in 1959, which mandated that the Ministry of Education establish libraries across the Kingdom. The Public Library of Madinah was established in 1960 on the southern side of the Prophet's Mosque. Libraries were established not only in large cities but also in Villages, such as Rawdat Sudair (est. 1958), Ushaqir (est. 1955), and Hotat Bani Tamim (est. 1957).

Between 1400 AH and 1405 AH, increasing the number of public libraries was a key development goal. Nine public libraries were established, adding a collection of 82,844 total documents. The School Libraries Administration became affiliated with the General Administration of Libraries, which reports to the Assistant Undersecretary of the Ministry of Education for Cultural and External Relations. Between 1405 AH and 1410 AH, the number of public libraries grew to 59, adding a total collection of 1,121,979 documents, and the labor force grew to 262. Between 1415 AH to 1420 AH, the number of public libraries grew to 71. In 1417 AH, the Ministry of Education, which oversaw this sector at the time, approved the "Public Libraries: Rules for Internal Organization” regulation, which provides for the development of libraries and the strengthening of their social and cultural position.

== Libraries ==
=== Public Libraries ===
A number of quality libraries were established across the Kingdom in the 1980s. The most prominent example is the King Abdulaziz Public Library in Al-Madinah (est. 1983), one of the largest affiliated with the Ministry of Islamic Affairs, Dawah and Guidance. This library is unique due to its hybrid form: it is part public library, part manuscript centre, and part scholarly research centre. It also houses one of the endowed collections of Al-Madinah. In the same year, the King Faisal Center for Research and Islamic Studies Library was established in Riyadh.

=== The National Library ===
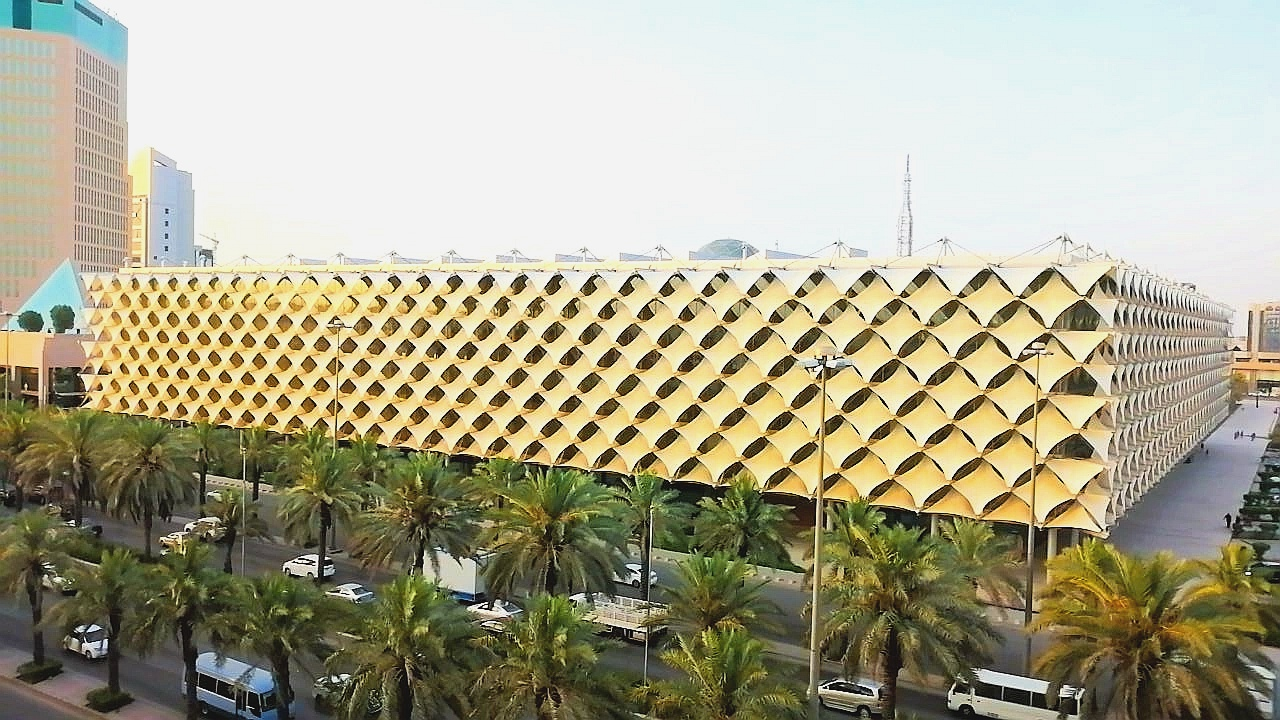
King Fahad National Library

Perhaps the most important development in the library sector in the Kingdom was the founding of the King Fahad National Library in the city of Riyadh, which began as a grassroots initiative and was later adopted by the government. The project began under the supervision of the Riyadh Municipality and was completed after three years, opening its doors to the public in 1988. The founding of the King Abdulaziz Public Library in Riyadh in 1987 was equally important.

=== Private Libraries ===
Today, 35% of Saudi families have a private library in their homes. The leading categories of books found in these home libraries are religious and academic books, followed by poetry and literature. This data does not specify the gender or age group of the individuals who own the library and thus does not necessarily shed light on the interests of particular groups or the types of books they own. Consequently, the data does not highlight related trends that may differ over time or by generation, particularly given the transformative role of technology over the last two decades.

=== Endowed Libraries ===
The endowed libraries in Saudi Arabia, are overseen by the Ministry of Islamic Affairs, Dawah, and Guidance. The most prominent is the King Abdulaziz Public Library in Al-Madinah, which holds more than 14,000 original manuscripts, 1,878 Qur’anic manuscripts, 25,000 rare books, and approximately 9,000 databases. The King Abdulaziz Public Library in Al-Madinah consists of 35 endowed collections. Some, including the Library of the Noble Qur’an, were established after the creation of the Saudi state, while others date back to older historical periods. These include the Sheikh Aref Hekmat, Mahmoudi, Shifa, Bashir Agha, and Kelly Nazari libraries, as well as legal-school and Sufi-lodge libraries such as the Ihsaniyyah, Irfaniyya, Kazaniyah, Ribat Sayyidna Othman, Qarabash Ribat, and Rabat al-Jabr libraries. It also includes the collections of some scholars of Al-Madinah, such as those belonging to Sheikh Hassan Kutbi and Sheikh Muhammad Al-Khader Al-Shanqeeti.

=== School Libraries ===
It is difficult to determine the precise beginning of the emergence of school libraries in the Kingdom due to the lack of accurate documentation, but it is agreed that this type of library existed in the early stages of the Kingdom's history. For example, in 1324, the Al-Sawlatiyyah School in Makkah opened a public library, the oldest in the Kingdom, frequented by students reading and borrowing books outside of class time. The Student Library was opened in the Saudi Scientific Institute in 1358 AH. Thereafter more school libraries were opened to support education and serve students and teachers. The year 1379 AH is of particular importance in the history of school libraries, as it was the year that the Ministry of Education established the General Administration of Libraries as an independent organizational entity to oversee public school libraries.

In 1997, the Ministry of Education transformed school libraries into learning resource centres (LRCs) that accommodate technological changes and provide access to knowledge and knowledge production beyond the normal scope of traditional library services.

== See also ==
- Copyright law of Saudi Arabia
- Library associations in Saudi Arabia
- Mass media in Saudi Arabia
- Museums in Saudi Arabia
