= Ajyal TV =

Saudi Arabian children's television channel

Ajyal
- Country: Saudi Arabia (first days of broadcast in 2009); Arab world
- Headquarters: Jeddah, Saudi Arabia

Programming
- Language: Arabic
- Picture format: (576i on free-to-air, satellite and cable and YouTube live streams from 2012-2014; 720p on YouTube from 2014-2018)

Ownership
- Owner: Saudi Broadcasting Authority

History
- Launched: 20 September 2009; 17 years ago
- Closed: 23 July 2018; 8 years ago
- Replaced by: SBC

Ajyal TV/TV5 Saudi Ajyal (lit. "generations") was a free-to-air children's television channel owned by the Saudi Broadcasting Authority. It was launched on Eid al-Fitr in 2009. The channel offered a variety of educational and entertaining programs for children of all ages, including cartoons, live-action shows (which are usually in-house productions), in addition to national holidays of Saudi Arabia and religious programs (usually in the month of Ramadan).

== History ==
The channel's test broadcasts began in very late June or very early July 2009. Ajyal TV officially launched on Eid al-Fitr in 2009.

In 2014, the channel underwent a rebranding with a new visual identity (the dominant color being orange instead of red). Ajyal TV ceased broadcasting in 2018 based on a decision by the president of the Saudi Broadcasting Authority with the intention of merging it into Saudi 1. Unfortunately, the process never came into fruition.

== In-house programming ==
The channel presented and produced many programs. A partial list of them:

- Asdiqa Ajyal: is the main program of the channel through a daily live broadcast at 5pm which was daily except Friday and Saturday. The program offers a variety of paragraphs in which information, benefit, guidance, advice, fun and direct communication with its child viewers.
- Weekend: It is a weekly program that overlooks viewers every Saturday at 10AM live, presented by Abdul Rahman Al-Zahrani, Ghadeer Al-Balushi, Joanna Talal and Fawaz Al-Qabi.
- Win with Rabih: A program of competitions and challenges between two teams of the public, presented by Fawaz Al-Qabi and Ghadeer Al-Balushi.
