= Abdullah Al-Maghlouth =

Saudi journalists and writer

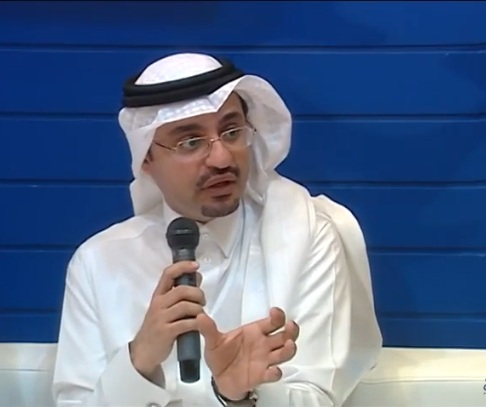
- Born: July 24, 1978 (age 47); Saudi Arabia
- Occupation: Writer
- Title: Director-general of Saudi Center for Government Communication

Abdullah bin Ahmed bin Abdullah Al-Maghlouth (Arabic: عبدالله المغلوث) is a Saudi journalist and the director-general of Saudi Center for Government Communication. He is from Al-Ahsa, Saudi Arabia, and he was born on July 24, 1978. He worked in several Arab and Saudi newspapers and magazines such as: Al Yaum, Al-Hayat, Al Watan, Elaph, Al-Qafila, Forbes, and Tirhal.

== Education ==
In 2005, he received a bachelor's degree in communications and marketing techniques from Weber State University in Ogden, Utah. He earned his master's from the University of Colorado. In addition, he received Prince Bandar Bin Sultan Award for Scientific Excellence. He received a doctorate in media from the University of Salford in Manchester.

He currently writes weekly articles for Al Watan newspaper Saudi Arabia every Saturday, discussing social and cultural issues.

He had been a Saudi Aramco employee since October 2005 and previously chaired the company's media relations unit in 2006. In November 2007, he chaired the information committee at the third OPEC summit. He also chaired the committee at the Jeddah energy meeting, which was held in Jeddah in May 2008. He was on an exchange project with the King Abdullah University of Science and Technology in 2008 before pursuing his PhD. He works as the official spokesperson of the Ministry of Culture and Information and the director-general of Center for Government Communication.

== Works ==
- Aramco: From the Han River to the Plains of Lombardy (original: Arāmkawīyūn: min Nahr al-Hān ilá suhūl Lūmbārdiyā) (2008)
- The Black Box: Tails of Saudi Intellectuals (2010)
- Be Good! Critiquing Social Phenomena (original: Kyẖā yā Bābā: fī Nāqd ālẓwāhyr ālǧtymāʿyā) (2011) A quote from the book: “Try to express your feelings, emotions and dreams directly. Don't wait for tomorrow.”
- An Antibiotic for Hopelessness: Saudi Success Stories (original: mwḍād ḥyāwy lilyās: qiṣaṣ najaḥ swʿwdyā) (2011)
- Singing of Happiness, Optimism and Hope (original: Taghrīd fī al-saʻādah wa-al-tafāʼul wa-al-amal) (2012)
- Saudi Netizens (original: Intirnitīyūn Saʻūdīyūn) (2013) A quote from the book: “Remember, those who disapprove of your choices will be the first to applaud you when you succeed.”
- 7:46 p.m. (2013) A quote from the book: “The easiest way to define a nation’s future is to see its children.”
- Tomorrow Shall Be Better (original: ghadan Ajmal) (2017)
- The Sweetness of Coffee Is in Its Bitterness (original: Ḥalāwat al-qahwah fī marāratihā) (2019)
- Imagine a World Without Filipinos: Arab News (2008)
