= Fatin =

- Pronunciation: Arabic: [faˈtˤiːn] (فطين); Arabic: [ˈfaːtin] (فاتن)
- Gender: Unisex
- Language: Arabic, Turkish

Origin
- Origin: Arabic
- Meaning: Intelligent (فطين); Charming (فاتن)
- Region of origin: Arabia

Other names
- Alternative spelling: Fateen, Fatine; Faten, Faatin

Fatin are two Arabic unisex given names and surnames, Arabic: فطين and Arabic: فاتن. Notable people with the name include:

== Given name ==
=== Male ===
- Fatin Youssef Bundagji (born 1958), Saudi Arabian businessperson
- Fatin Gökmen (1877–1955), Turkish astronomer and politician
- Fatin Abdel Wahab (1913–1972), Egyptian film director
- Fatin Rüştü Zorlu (1910–1961), Turkish diplomat and politician

=== Female ===
- Fatin Zakirah Zain Jalany (born 1997), Malaysian rhythmic gymnast
- Fatin al-Murr (born 1969), Lebanese academic and writer
- Fatin Shidqia (born 1996), Indonesian singer

=== Middle name ===
- Zaki Fatin Abdel Wahab (1961–2022), Egyptian actor and film director

== Surname ==
- Igor Fatin (born 1962), Russian footballer
- Wendy Fatin (born 1941), Australian politician
