= Small and Medium Enterprises General Authority =

Saudi government agency for small and medium enterprises

Small and Medium Enterprises General Authority (Monsha'at)
- الهيئة العامة للمنشآت الصغيرة والمتوسطة

Agency overview
- Formed: 2016; 10 years ago
- Jurisdiction: Saudi Arabia
- Headquarters: Riyadh
- Agency executive: Sami Al-Husseini, Governor
- Parent department: Ministry of Commerce
- Website: monshaat.gov.sa

The Small and Medium Enterprises General Authority (Note: Also rendered in English as "General Authority for Small and Medium Enterprises". Both forms appear in official sources.) (الهيئة العامة للمنشآت الصغيرة والمتوسطة), known as Monsha'at (منشآت), is a Saudi government authority that is responsible for supporting and developing the country's small and medium-sized enterprises (SMEs). Its responsibilities include preparing a national strategy for the sector, proposing laws and policies, setting standards for financing and support, and organizing business incubators. The Minister of Commerce chairs its board of directors.

== History ==
In October 2015, the Council of Ministers approved the establishment of the authority as an independent body with legal personality and financial and administrative independence. It took over business incubation support from the Saudi Credit and Savings Bank and the Ministry of Commerce and Industry's National Center for Small Enterprises, while SME financing moved to the Saudi Industrial Development Fund. The cabinet approved the authority's organizational framework in April 2016, formally establishing it.

Minister of Commerce and Investment Majid Al-Qasabi appointed Ghassan Al-Sulaiman, a former head of the Jeddah Chamber of Commerce and Industry, as the authority's governor in August 2016. He was succeeded in January 2018 by Saleh Al-Rasheed, previously chief executive of Riyadh Airports Company. In August 2022, Sami Al-Husseini became governor of the authority after serving as deputy governor for planning and development for approximately three years.

== Organization ==
=== Legal status ===
Under its organizational regulation, issued by the Council of Ministers in 2016, the authority is a financially and administratively independent public body linked to the Minister of Commerce, headquartered in Riyadh, with authorization to open branches and offices inside the country.

=== Board of directors ===
It has a board of directors composed of 18 members, including the Minister of Commerce; the authority's governor; a representative from each of eight ministries including Education, Commerce, Finance, and Economy and Planning; a representative each from KACST, Saudi Central Bank, Social Development Bank, Saudi Industrial Development Fund, and Human Resources Development Fund (Saudi Arabia); a representative of the Federation of Saudi Chambers, and two members with an interest in the SME sector.

The members holding the chambers seat and the two SME sector seats are appointed by the Council of Ministers for three-year terms, renewable once.

The board meets four times a year on a regular schedule, although the chair, who is also the Minister of Commerce, can call more meetings, and three members can request an additional meeting.

The board is in charge of approving plans and policies, branches and offices, criteria for the classification of small and medium-sized enterprises, the draft budget, and the annual report. It also draws up the organizational structure and submits it for approval.

=== Governor and executive management ===
Under the regulation, the board appoints, dismisses, and sets the pay for the authority's governor. The governor runs the authority, represents it, and prepares the annual report.

As of 2026, the authority also has six deputy governors, for planning and development, enterprise services, entrepreneurship, communication, strategy, and shared services.

=== Funding ===
The authority's revenue comes from state budget allocations, service fees, board-approved grants, donations and endowments, investment returns, and any other source approved by the board. The funds are held in an account at the Saudi Central Bank, and the authority can open accounts at licensed banks in the country with Ministry of Finance approval.

It has its own budget, and its fiscal year is the state's.

=== Regional offices ===
As of October 2025, there were three regional offices, in Al-Baha, Asir, and Qassim. In November 2025, a fourth regional office was opened in Jazan.

== Programs ==
The authority's mandate is to support the creation of specialized finance companies, remove administrative and financial barriers for small businesses, and run programs to identify investment opportunities. Its stated goal is to raise the contribution of SMEs to GDP from 20% to 35% by 2030, in line with Saudi Vision 2030.

In October 2018, it launched an SR 2.8 billion venture capital initiative with the Local Content and Private Sector Development Unit (Namaa). Its Estrdad program refunds government fees paid by businesses in their first three years; the program's second edition was allocated SR 1.5 billion (US$400 million). It also joined the Social Development Bank's Entrepreneurs Program in 2024, which has support centers in Riyadh, Medina, Jeddah, and Khobar.

The authority organizes Biban, an annual entrepreneurship forum and exhibition in Riyadh. The event's 11th edition was held in November 2025. The authority also publishes data on the sector, and it counted about 1.3 million SMEs at the end of 2023.

== See also ==
- Economy of Saudi Arabia
- National Development Fund (Saudi Arabia)
- Ministries of Saudi Arabia
