= Al Saudiya =

Saudi Arabian news and entertainment television channel

- Country: Saudi Arabia
- Broadcast area: Worldwide (primarily Arab world)
- Network: Broadcasting Services of the Kingdom of Saudi Arabia
- Headquarters: Riyadh, Saudi Arabia

Programming
- Languages: Arabic, English
- Picture format: 1080p MPEG-4 HDTV

Ownership
- Owner: Saudi Broadcasting Authority

History
- Launched: July 7, 1965; 61 years ago

Links
- Website: SAUDI 1 Official website Official website

Al Saudiya (previously known as Saudi TV Channel 1 and KSA 1), is a Saudi Arabian news and entertainment television channel broadcasting in Arabic, owned by the Saudi Broadcasting Authority (SBA), which is state-run and is administered by the Ministry of Media.

Broadcasting throughout the West Asia, Europe and North America, KSA 1 officially began transmissions on 7 July 1965 in black and white from Riyadh and Jeddah until 1974, when color broadcasting was introduced in Jeddah and Mecca.

While the channel produces programmes focusing on cultural, political, and economic issues, it also shows of religious programmes and Islamic rituals. It is known for being the first channel to broadcast the Hajj pilgrimage, and has done so since the end of 1974.

== History ==
Saudi Arabian state television made its first broadcast on July 17, 1965, carrying signal tests in Riyadh and Jeddah. These tests consisted of static slides, music, and some Mighty Mouse cartoons. The two stations were set up with assistance from NBC International.

It was the third television station to sign on in Saudi Arabia, after Aramco TV (1957) and AJL-TV (1955). The introduction of a national service was seen with controversy from conservative Islamic clerics, believing that television was the "devil's handiwork". The first regular broadcast of Saudi Television was a reading of the Qur'an.

With limited resources, Saudi Television broadcast from the two centers with a schedule that didn't surpass five hours a day. By the 1970s, the station was broadcasting on two shifts on weekdays (10am to 1pm; 6pm to midnight) and a continuous shift on weekends (without the afternoon break).

In December 2012, the Intelligence Bureau of India flagged Al Saudiya as a "hate channel" allegedly broadcasting anti-India programming. It was one of the twenty-four "illegal" channels to have been flagged.
