= General Authority for Foreign Trade =

- Formation: 1 January 2019
- Founder: Government of Saudi Arabia
- Purpose: Foreign Trade
- Parent organization: Ministry of Commerce and Investment
- Website: gaft.gov.sa/en/

The General Authority for Foreign Trade is a government agency in Saudi Arabia was established on 1 January 2019 and responsible for enhancing the international commercial and investment activities of the Kingdom.

== Structure ==
The authority is governed by a board of directors headed by the Minister of Commerce and Investment. The board of directors includes representatives from other ministries and governmental agencies. The current governor of the authority is Abdulrahman Al Harbi who was appointed by a royal decree issued on 23 March 2019.

== Responsibilities ==
The authority has primary duties, including :

- Enabling Saudi non-oil exports to target markets.
- Supporting the private sector to participate in foreign trade effectively.
- Eliminating any obstacles facing foreign trade.
