= Jeddah Economic Forum =

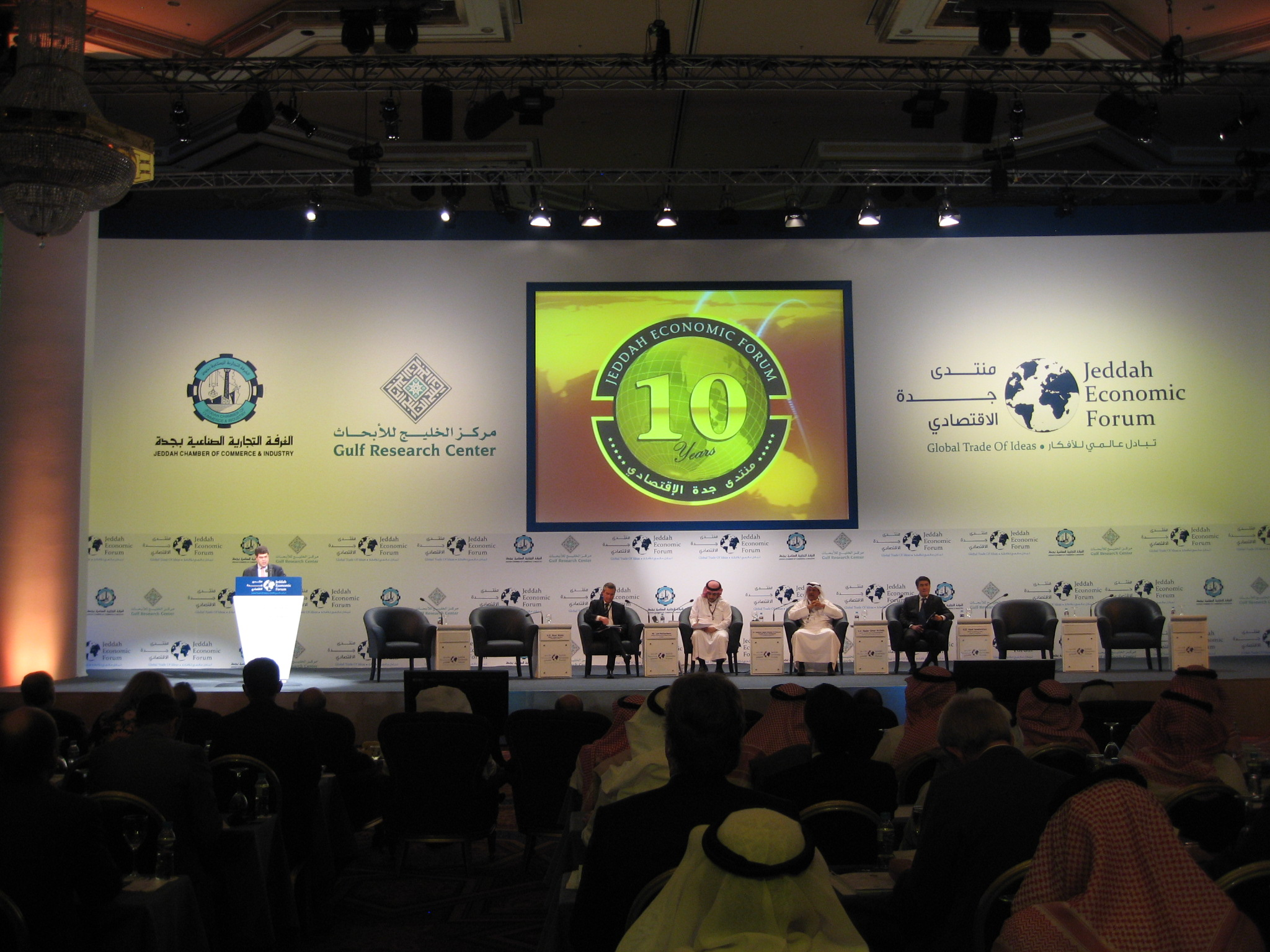

Jeddah Economic Forum (JEF) (Arabic: منتدى جدة الإقتصادي) is a forum held annually since 1999 during winter in the city of Jeddah, western Saudi Arabia. The Jeddah Economic Forum is organized by the Jeddah Marketing Board, which is a part of Jeddah Chamber of Commerce & Industry.

The current president of the forum is Shiekh Saleh Kamel. The forum was founded by Amr Dabbagh. The current president of the forum is Shiekh Saleh Kamel.

== See also ==
- World Economic Forum
- Jeddah Chamber of Commerce & Industry
- Jeddah
