= Turki Al-Shabanah =

His Excellency Turki Abdullah Al-Shabanah
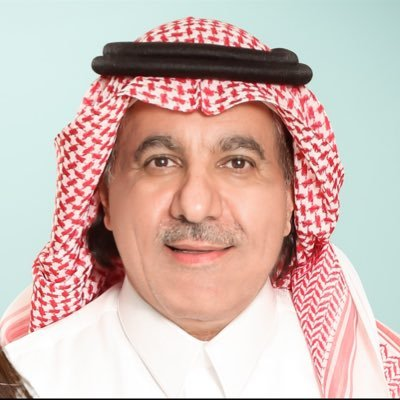

Minister of Media
- In office 27 December 2018 – 25 February 2020
- Monarch: King Salman bin Abdulaziz Al Saud
- Preceded by: Awwad Alawwad

Personal details
- Born: 9 November 1964 (age 60); Riyadh, Saudi Arabia

Turki Abdullah Al-Shabanah was the Minister of Media in the Kingdom of Saudi Arabia from 27 December 2018 to 25 February 2020. A longstanding media and entertainment executive prior to his appointment, Al Shabanah has run a variety of companies including Rotana. He was ranked by variety magazine as one of the "500 Most Influential Media Personalities of the World" in late 2018.

== His upbringing and education ==
Turki Al-Shabanah was born on the sixth of November 1964 in the city of Riyadh, and he studied in its primary and secondary schools, then joined the Faculty of Law at King Saud University, in 1990, from which he graduated with a Bachelor's degree in Law.

Then he traveled to the United States, where he joined the American University in Washington, in 1993, where he obtained a master's degree in International Law – Commerce.

== His family ==
His brother is Major General Abd al-Rahman Abdullah al-Shabanah. On the twenty-fourth of November 2011, he married the daughter of Dr.Abd al-Rahman bin Abdullah al-Otaibi. He has two daughters, Jawhara and Lulua, and one son, Khaled.

== His professional career ==
- Turki Al-Shabanah held the position of responsible for the "MBC" station in the United States of America in 1996, and he also held the position of assistant to the general supervisor of this group in the city of London, before it moved to its current headquarters in Dubai.
- He held the position of Head of Program Production and General Supervisor of MBC Radio Group until 7 July 2002.
- He was the supervisor of the production of many different programs, which were produced in the station centers in Cairo and Beirut, as well as Amman and Al Riyadh city.
- In 2003, he founded the TASS Media Consulting Company, and in the same year he worked as a special advisor to Prince Al-Waleed bin Talal until 2007.
- On 27 December 2018, a royal decree was issued by Saudi King Salman bin Abdulaziz Al Saud, appointing him as Saudi Minister of media, and he held this position until 2020.

== His previous positions in Washington ==
– 1995 – 2002

- chief executive officer of the Middle East Television Group (MBC), Washington – US
- CEO of the Arab American Network (ANA) Washington – US
- Vice President of the Programs and Production Sector for (MBC) Group in London / Washington / Dubai / Riyadh / Beirut / Cairo

– 1993 – 1995

- Intern lawyer for Winston & Strawn – Washington – US
- Business Development Manager for United Press International – Washington – US

== His previous positions in Saudi Arabia ==
– 2018 – 2020

- Saudi Minister of media

– 2007 – 2018

- CEO of the TV and Film Production Sector, Rotana Group

– 2003 – 2007

- Executive Assistant to Prince Alwaleed Bin Talal Bin Abdulaziz, Rotana Group

== His Achievements ==
- Founder of the "Arab American Network" festival in Washington in 1998.
- Establishment of TASS Media Consulting.
- Converting Rotana Khalijiah channel from a music channel to an entertainment channel.

== His Achievements As Minister of Media ==
- Launching the "Medad" Association for the Care of Media Workers

Mr. Turki Al-Shabanah announced the launching of the association in February 2020, and confirmed at this time that the association was established to care for media workers of all kinds in official and private institutions.

- Launching a housing program for journalists

In February 2020, Turki Al-Shabanah launched a housing program for media professionals, in partnership with the Saudi Arabia Ministry of Housing.

- Launching the electronic platform for professional registration of media professionals

His period in the ministry witnessed the launch of the electronic platform, which provided the opportunity for all media workers of all kinds to enter and register to obtain a professional card.

- The Ministry of Media achieves the first place in the ranking of government agencies in its contribution to the electronic transformation of government services

His period in the Ministry witnessed the Ministry obtaining the first place in the ranking of government agencies in its contribution to the electronic transformation of government services, out of 167 government agencies.

== Awards and honors ==
- A ceremony honoring the Arab Thought Foundation for media partners and the "Rotana" channel network

Mr. Turki Al-Shabaneh, CEO of the "Rotana" channel network, received the honorary shield for his channels from Prince Khaled Al-Faisal, as a major media partner in the fourteenth session of the institution.

- Turki Al-Shabanah in the list of the 500 most powerful media personalities

He was chosen by the international magazine "Variety" among the list of the most powerful figures working in the media in the world. In its new list, the magazine revealed 500 names representing the most influential international figures in the media field in their countries and around the world. Among them were Turki Al-Shabanah, Steve Burke CEO of NBC Universal, Eddie Cue Vice President of Apple, and Jack Dorsey CEO of Twitter.

- Best Creative Campaign Award for Hajj 1439
