= Ministry of Commerce (Saudi Arabia) =

Government ministry of Saudi Arabia

- وزارة التجارة

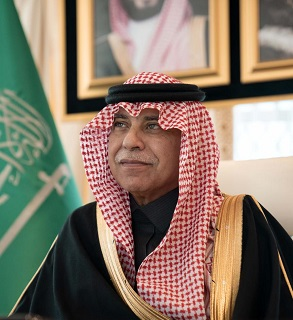
- Majid Al-Qasabi, the current Minister of Commerce since 7 May 2016

Agency overview
- Formed: January 30, 1954; 72 years ago
- Preceding agency: Merchants' Council (1926 – 1954)
- Jurisdiction: Government of Saudi Arabia
- Headquarters: Riyadh
- Minister responsible: Majid Al-Qasabi
- Child agencies: General Authority for Foreign Trade; Small and Medium Enterprises General Authority
- Website: Official English Website

The Ministry of Commerce (Arabic: وزارة التجارة) is a government ministry in Saudi Arabia that oversees commercial activity in the Kingdom and develops policies related to trade and the business sector.

== History ==
Between 1926 and 1954, the Merchants' Council, established by King Abdulaziz, managed commercial affairs in Saudi Arabia before being replaced by the Ministry of Commerce, created by a Royal Decree in 1954 to oversee domestic and international trade.

The ministry was reorganized in 2003 and renamed the Ministry of Commerce and Industry.

It was renamed the Ministry of Commerce and Investment in 2016.

On 25 February 2020, following the establishment of the Ministry of Investment, the ministry’s name was changed to the Ministry of Commerce.

== Structure ==
The Ministry has several agencies including:

- Deputy Ministry for Consumer Protection
- Deputy Ministry for Industry Affairs
- Deputy Ministry for Foreign Trade
- Deputy Ministry of Internal Trade
- Deputy Ministry for Technical Affairs
- Marketing and Communication Management
- Administrative and Financial Affairs Management
- Information Technology Management
- General Directorate for Strategic Planning and Projects
- Engineering Management

The minister also chairs the board of the Small and Medium Enterprises General Authority (Monsha'at).

== Commercial Attachés Offices ==
The Ministry also supervises commercial attachés offices worldwide with the aims of establishing and developing commercial relationships with other countries. In May 2018, Saudi Arabia appointed with Samar Saleh the first woman to be a commercial attaché in Japan.

== List of commerce officials ==
No.	Portrait	Official	Took office	Left office	Time in office
Ministers of Commerce (1954–2003)
1		Mohammed Alireza	2 March 1954	19 January 1958	3 years, 323 days
2		Ahmed Jamjoom	19 January 1958	21 December 1960	2 years, 337 days
3		Ahmed Shata	21 December 1960	16 March 1962	1 year, 85 days
4		Ahmed Jamjoom	16 March 1962	31 October 1962	229 days
5		Abid Sheikh	31 October 1962	22 September 1971	8 years, 326 days
6		Mohammed Al-Awadi	22 September 1971	13 October 1975	4 years, 21 days
7		Soliman Al-Solaim	13 October 1975	2 August 1995	19 years, 293 days
8		Osama Faqeeh	2 August 1995	1 May 2003	7 years, 272 days
Ministers of Commerce and Industry (2003–2016)
1		Hashim Yamani	1 May 2003	3 March 2008	4 years, 307 days
2		Abdullah Alireza	3 March 2008	13 December 2011	3 years, 285 days
3		Tawfig Al-Rabiah	13 December 2011	7 May 2016	4 years, 146 days
Ministers of Commerce and Investment (2016–2020)
1		Majid Al-Qasabi	7 May 2016	25 February 2020	3 years, 294 days
Ministers of Commerce (2020–present)
1		Majid Al-Qasabi	25 February 2020	Incumbent	6 years, 231 days

== See also ==
- Ministries of Saudi Arabia
