= Fatin Youssef Bundagji =

Saudi Arabian businesswoman

Fatin Bundagji (Arabic: فاتن بندقجي; born in 1958) is a businessperson and an appointed member of the board of directors of the Jeddah Chamber of Commerce and Industry.

She is an Eisenhower Fellow. She holds a master's degree in English literature from King Abdul Aziz University.

In 1998 she was appointed to establish the first women’s division in the Jeddah Chamber of Commerce and Industry a position that is the first of its kind for Saudi women in all the Chambers of the Kingdom of Saudi Arabia.

On the civic level Bundagji was a key player in bringing about the desire of women to run for non-democratic municipal council elections. In 2004, she was the first woman in the Western Region to announce her desire to run for elections. In 2009 she co-founded the Balady Initiative that advocates for the right of women to leadership positions in public office. She is a co-founder of MUWATANA a group that advocates for city development by focusing on man, place and the rule of law.
