= Center for Government Communication =

Agency overview
- Formed: August 1, 2017
- Headquarters: General Commission for Audio Visual Media, Digital City, Riyadh, Saudi Arabia.
- Agency executive: Awwad Alawwad
- Parent agency: Ministry of Culture and Information
- Website: cgc.gov.sa/en

The Saudi Center for Government Communication (CGC) is a Saudi Arabian government media organization established in August 2017 by the Minister of Culture and Information (MOCI).

The Saudi Gazette described the CGC's purpose at its launch as "boosting relations with the international media and following a more open policy towards the international audience". The establishment of the CGC is part of the Vision 2030 project spearheaded by Saudi Crown Prince Mohammed bin Salman.

== Activities ==
=== Promotion of Saudi Arabia ===
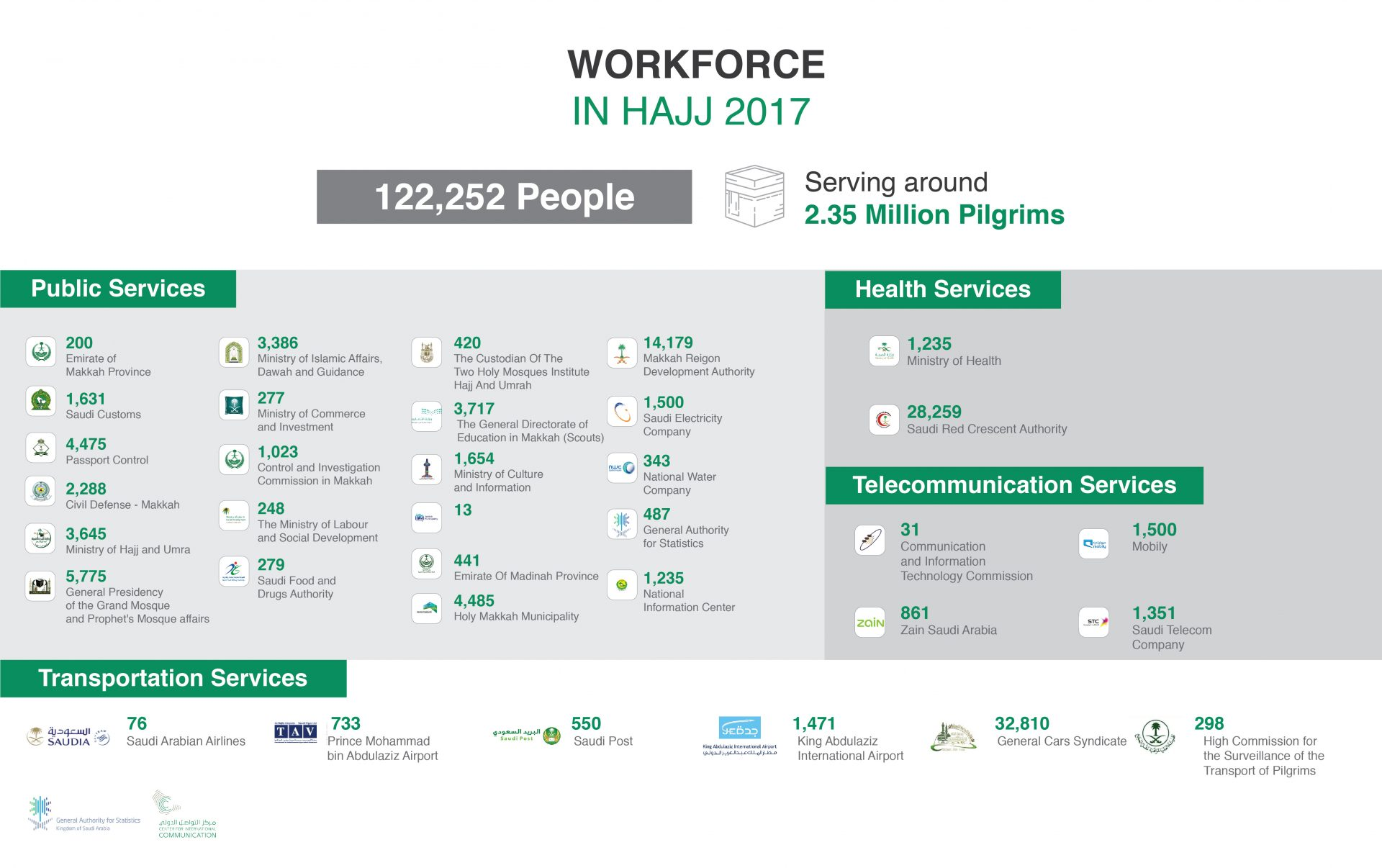
Infographic about Hajj 2017 Workforce, published by Center for International Communication

The Center acts as a central source of information about Saudi Arabia to the outside world. This information includes a governmental statistics bureau that publishes data, infographics, videographics and documents. The center responds to media inquiries on fields such as politics, tourism, gender equality, human rights and local investment opportunities in both English and Arabic.

=== International outreach ===
CGC aims to help the international press in understanding local news, cultural, social and political trends in Saudi Arabia and by broadcasting information and reports about events involving the Kingdom. The Center also aims to support the Ministry's stated aim of reforming its media industries at home, supporting government communications abroad and strengthening Saudi Arabia's cultural relations around the world.

=== Events ===
CGC works in concord with other entities in the Saudi Minister of Culture and Information (MOCI) to produce events in Saudi Arabia to promote Saudi, Arabic and Islamic culture.
