= National Center for e-Learning =

The National Center for e-Learning and Distance Learning
- Established: 2005
- Director: Abdullah Al-Megren, Ph. D
- Location: Riyadh, KSA
- Website: http://elc.edu.sa/portal/ -->

The National Center for e-Learning and Distance Learning (NCeL) is a project of the Higher Education Ministry in the Kingdom of Saudi Arabia. Founded in 2005, the National Center for e-learning and distance learning aims to become an international leader in research, development and implementation of e-learning architecture and infrastructure using open standards.

== NCeL's Projects ==
1. Tajseer: the Tajseer initiative is part of the National Center for E-learning & Distance learning (NCeDL), under the guidance of the Ministry of Higher Education, overall complementary strategy, which was designed to help developing the tradition ways of teaching and learning to become more advanced through the use of technology. The initiative, therefore, focuses on supporting higher education institutions and prepares them to implement the most recent technologies and applications available in the field of E-learning and distance learning.
2. Jusur: Jusur is an LMS designed by the National Center of E-learning and Distance Learning in order to manage the E-Learning process in the kingdom of Saudi Arabia.
3. Portal:
4. Excellence Award: is an award from the National Center to creative projects by higher education staff related to and concerning e-Learning and distance learning.
5. Maknaz: National Repository for Learning Objects
6. Taiseer: is a service provided from the National Center to encourage the university staff to use Jusur by providing and simplifying the use of Jusur and all its services.
