= Channel 3 (Saudi Arabia) =

Former Saudi television station of ARAMCO

Saudi Aramco Television
- Eastern Province; Saudi Arabia
- City: Dhahran
- Channels: Analog: 3 (VHF)
- Branding: Channel 3

Programming
- Language: English

Ownership
- Owner: Saudi Aramco

History
- First air date: 16 September 1957
- Last air date: 31 December 1998
- Former call signs: HZ-22-TV

Channel 3, formerly known as H2ZZ-TV and corporately known as Saudi Aramco Television or just Aramco TV was a Saudi terrestrial television station owned by Aramco its later years broadcast entirely in English. The station broadcast from the Saudi Aramco Residential Camp in Dhahran.

The station was the second in Saudi Arabia and the first to be owned by a local company (AJL-TV, owned by the Armed Forces Radio and Television Service, was the first to launch in 1955). Initially a bilingual service operating in both English and Arabic, it later became a PAL service broadcasting exclusively in English, as one of the two such channels in Saudi Arabia (Saudi 2 was the other).

Numerous factors, especially censorship problems from viewers, led to the shutdown of the channel on 31 December 1998.

== History ==
Aramco TV or Dhahran TV started broadcasting on 16 September 1957 or 17 September according to some sources. It was the second television station in the Middle East (Baghdad Television in Iraq signed on in the previous year). During its first eight months on air, the station broadcast one hour a day, six days a week.

The station was primarily aimed at an audience of 9,000 Saudis at the camp, but its 12-kilowatt transmitter enabled the station to have a greater audience, 350,000 potential viewers in Saudi Arabia and neighboring countries and territories. Broadcasting on VHF channel 2 in the 525-line standard, it employed the H2-ZZ callsign. As of 1963, Aramco TV employed a staff of 65, the vast majority of which (54) were Saudi Arabian and the remaining 11, from the Levant and the United States. The station had a dual mission, education and recreation for its viewers.

AJL-TV, which started before, went off the air in 1961.

By 1963, the station was broadcasting three hours a day. The station faced a massive problem, a limited radius of reception, which was being solved with the installation of a new repeater station in the Hofuf area, about 60 miles from the main Aramco compound.

In November 1969, Aramco TV opened its relay station in Dammam. This caused the station to cease both production of original programming and programming in Arabic. The station was now broadcasting exclusively in English. Gradually, the number of entertainment programs increased in proportion. When the Saudi government took over Aramco, the proportion of religious and news programming increased.

In 1970, the Dammam government station went on the aire and HZ-22-TV ended its Arabic-language broadcasts, becoming an all-English channel. In November 1976, the channel started to broadcast in color using NTSC system, but in March 1979 a new PAL transmitter was added.

During the Gulf War, it became a source of information for certain forces involved in the conflict. In December 1998, the station ran an announcement informing its viewers that the channel was going to shut down on New Year's Eve. On 31 December 1998, the national anthem played and the channel shut down.

== Programming ==
Aramco TV/Channel 3 primarily broadcast imports from the United States and the United Kingdom.

For its first day after opening with the Quran reading, the station carried a talk by Fahmi Basrawi of Aramco Public Relations, telling the purpose of the service to its 1,900 viewers at the time, finishing with the local feature film Jazirat al-Arab (The Island of Allah, also The Island of Arabia), an Aramco production about King 'Abd al-'Aziz Ibn Sa'ud, the discovery of oil and the creation of the Kingdom of Saudi Arabia in the 1930s. The second day saw the first broadcasts of American content, Whirlybirds and I Search for Adventure. The third day introduced Your Health, a long-running program produced by the station, the topic of the first edition was malaria control. In these three days alone, Saudi Aramco Television had achieved its primary goals. The United States at the time was the only country with a large-enough filmed inventory of television content, where such content would be leased and repeated.

In 1963, during the bilingual phase of the service, the station aired five Arabic movies and four English-language movies dubbed to Arabic. The station also carried standard US primetime fare, such as Disneyland, Sea Hunt, Checkmate, Rawhide and The Adventures of Ozzie and Harriet. Perry Mason aired with Arabic dubbing. One third of the schedule at the time consisted of educational content in both Arabic and English. Moreover, in this phase, the channel produced 45% of its content. Presenters of the local output were all from Aramco's Public Relations Department. Local production ceased after the Dammam station opened in 1969.

With the service becoming an all-English channel, most of the programs seen on the service came from the United States.

The station avoided the broadcast of news bulletins, a topic deemed "sensitive" by the station, but started relaying the English-language news service from Saudi Arabian state television in 1982.

In line with Islamic moral standards, the station opened its daily schedule with readings from the Quran and broadcast prayer intermissions during prayer times. The first broadcast in 1957 started with a reading of the Quran. These strict Islamic teachings were spread to programming in general, as was also the norm in other Muslim countries, as elements deemed haram were censored. The station had no written rules for its censorship standards, under the grounds that this depended on common sense and knowledge about Saudi society, but starting in 1982, the Ministry of Information set up an office in Dammam to monitor Aramco TV's programs, by cutting scenes that contradicted strict Islamic teachings. Usually Aramco TV was more liberal when compared to Saudi state television. On 23 June 1978, the station broadcast a program about that year's Miss US beauty pageant. Moreover, the station broadcast many series that state television wouldn't air, such as The Love Boat, Laverne & Shirley, Happy Days, Hart to Hart, Police Woman, Dallas and Hill Street Blues. The Saudi government requested an increase in the amount of English-language programming at the station in 1990 with the outset of the Gulf War, but these were censored at the request of Aramco's public relations department in order to conform with Saudi cultural standards.
