= Al Ekhbariya =

Arabic news channel based in Riyadh, Saudi Arabia

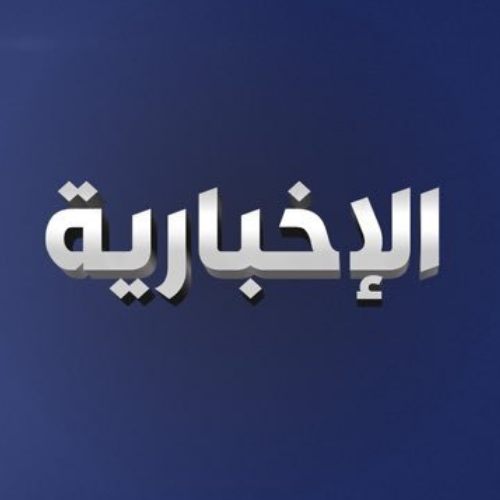
- Country: Saudi Arabia
- Broadcast area: Saudi Arabia; Bangladesh; Worldwide (primarily Arab world)
- Network: Saudi TV
- Headquarters: Riyadh, Saudi Arabia

Programming
- Picture format: 1080p MPEG-4 HDTV

Ownership
- Owner: Saudi Broadcasting Authority
- Sister channels: Al Saudiya; Faaliat; SBC; KSA SPORTS; Quran TV; Sunna TV

History
- Launched: 11 January 2004; 22 years ago

Links
- Website: alekhbariya.net

Ekhbariya TV (Arabic: الإخبارية) is a Saudi news and current affairs satellite TV channel based in Riyadh, Saudi Arabia.

== History ==
Launched on 11 January 2004, its aim according to its director was to present "a new image of the Gulf Arab state" to the wider region and the world. After the hiring of several Saudi women, its first bulletin was read by the kingdom's first female news presenter Buthaina Al-Nassr. Correspondents are based across the Middle East, Europe and America to provide coverage of news stories from around the world.

The channel, like its main competitor Al Jazeera, is owned by its government and run by the Ministry of Media, along with other channels that are part of the Saudi Television network. The station is transmitted to the Middle East and the Arabic speaking world from the Badr 4 satellite at an orbital position of 26.0° East.
