= Saudi Broadcasting Authority =

Government broadcasting network of Saudi Arabia

- Native name: هيئة الإذاعة والتلفزيون
- Type: Government-owned corporation
- Founded: 1962; 64 years ago (original); 13 July 2012; 14 years ago (current form)
- Headquarters: Riyadh
- Owner: Saudi Government
- Website: www.sba.sa

The Saudi Broadcasting Authority (SBA), formerly Saudi Broadcasting Corporation (SBC) and the Broadcasting Services of the Kingdom of Saudi Arabia (BSKSA), is a governmental entity of Saudi Arabia, organized under the Ministry of Media. BSKSA operates almost all broadcasting outlets in the Kingdom.

== Television stations ==
=== Current channels ===
- Al Saudiya: The premier official channel of the Kingdom of Saudi Arabia, providing three daily news briefings, supplemented by a curated selection of series and entertainment shows.
- Al Ekhbariya: Dedicated to comprehensive coverage of paramount regional and international news.
- KSA SPORT: The definitive source for broadcasts of First and Second League matches, along with selected sports events.
- SBC: A versatile platform showcasing entertainment, sports, drama, and a diverse range of TV shows.
- Quran TV: Offering a live stream directly from Masjid al-Haram, bringing the spiritual epicenter to viewers worldwide.
- Sunnah TV: Transmitting live from Masjid al-Nabawi, connecting viewers with one of Islam's most revered sites.

=== Former Channels ===
- Saudi 2 - Launched in 1983, it was the only English-language television channel belonging to the authority. It later went off-air in 2017.
- Ajyal TV - Launched in 2009, it was a Kids channel for ages 7-15, It later went off-air in 2018

== Radio stations ==
- Saudi General Program (AKA Riyadh Radio, إذاعة الرياض)
- Saudi Second Program (AKA Jeddah Radio, إذاعة جدة)
- Saudia Radio (راديو السعودية)
- International Programs (الإذاعات الدولية السعودية)
- Holy Quran Radio (إذاعة القرآن الكريم)
- Nedaa Al-Islam Radio (إذاعة نداء الإسلام)
- Military Radio (إذاعة الجيش السعودي)
