= Jeddah Chamber of Commerce & Industry =

Chamber of commerce

- الغرفة التجارية الصناعية بجدة
- Abbreviation: JCCI
- Formation: 1946; 80 years ago
- Type: Chamber of commerce
- Headquarters: Jeddah, Saudi Arabia
- Region served: Jeddah
- Website: jcci.org.sa

The Jeddah Chamber of Commerce & Industry (JCCI) is the chamber of commerce in the city of Jeddah, Saudi Arabia.

JCCI is one of the oldest business and services organizations in Saudi Arabia. It was established by a royal decree dated January 1946. Since then, with the efforts of 20 sessions of the Board of Directors, the chamber has been serving the national economy and business community, contributing to its development and progress.

== Notable people ==
- Fatin Youssef Bundagji (born 1958), board of directors member

== See also ==
- Jeddah Economic Forum
- Jeddah
- List of company registers
