= Saudi Patent Office =

Government entity in Saudi Arabia

Agency overview
- Jurisdiction: Saudi Arabia
- Headquarters: Riyadh, Saudi Arabia
- Agency executive: Saqr Al-Futtaimani, Director General
- Website: Saudi Patent Office

The Saudi Patent Office is a government entity in Saudi Arabia responsible for implementing of the law of patents including the processing of patents applications and granting and issuance related rights. It is part of the Saudi Authority for Intellectual Property (SAIP).

== History ==
In 1989, the first law of patents was issued to protect rights in Saudi Arabia. Later, in 2004 the law was amended to include the implementation of the law regulations.

== Statistics ==
In 2016, Saudi Arabia filed 1064 patents applications with the office, ranking the first among the top five countries. In the same year, the kingdom also ranked the first in deposing industrial design applications with 386, ranking the first among the top five countries. In 2017, Saudi Arabia ranked 23rd among 92 countries in number of patents granted by the United States Patent and Trademark Office. The Kingdom was granted 664 patents, which is double that of all Arab countries combined during the same period.
