= Saudi Authority for Intellectual Property =

Government body in Saudi Arabia

- الهيئة السعودية للملكية الفكرية

Agency overview
- Jurisdiction: Saudi Arabia
- Headquarters: Riyadh, Saudi Arabia
- Agency executive: Minister of Commerce and Investment, Chairman
- Child agencies: Saudi Patent Office; Department Of Trademarks; General Administration of Copyrights
- Website: Official Website (English)

The Saudi Authority for Intellectual Property (SAIP) (Arabic: الهيئة السعودية للملكية الفكرية) is an official government body in Saudi Arabia responsible for the protection and supporting the intellectual property in the Kingdom.

== Directorates ==
SAIP comprises three directorates to accomplish its tasks and objectives. These directorates are:

- The Saudi Patent Office, which is in charge of issuing patents in industrial, commercial, and agricultural fields.
- The Department Of Trademarks, which is responsible for the processing of trademarks applications including the registration and declaration of trademarks.
- The General Administration of Copyrights, which is responsible for issuing and protecting the work produced in literature, art, and sciences field.

== Structure ==
The Saudi Authority for Intellectual Property is governed by a board of directors and it is organizationally linked to the Prime Minister.
