= Ministry of Media (Saudi Arabia) =

Government ministry of Saudi Arabia

- وزارة الإعلام

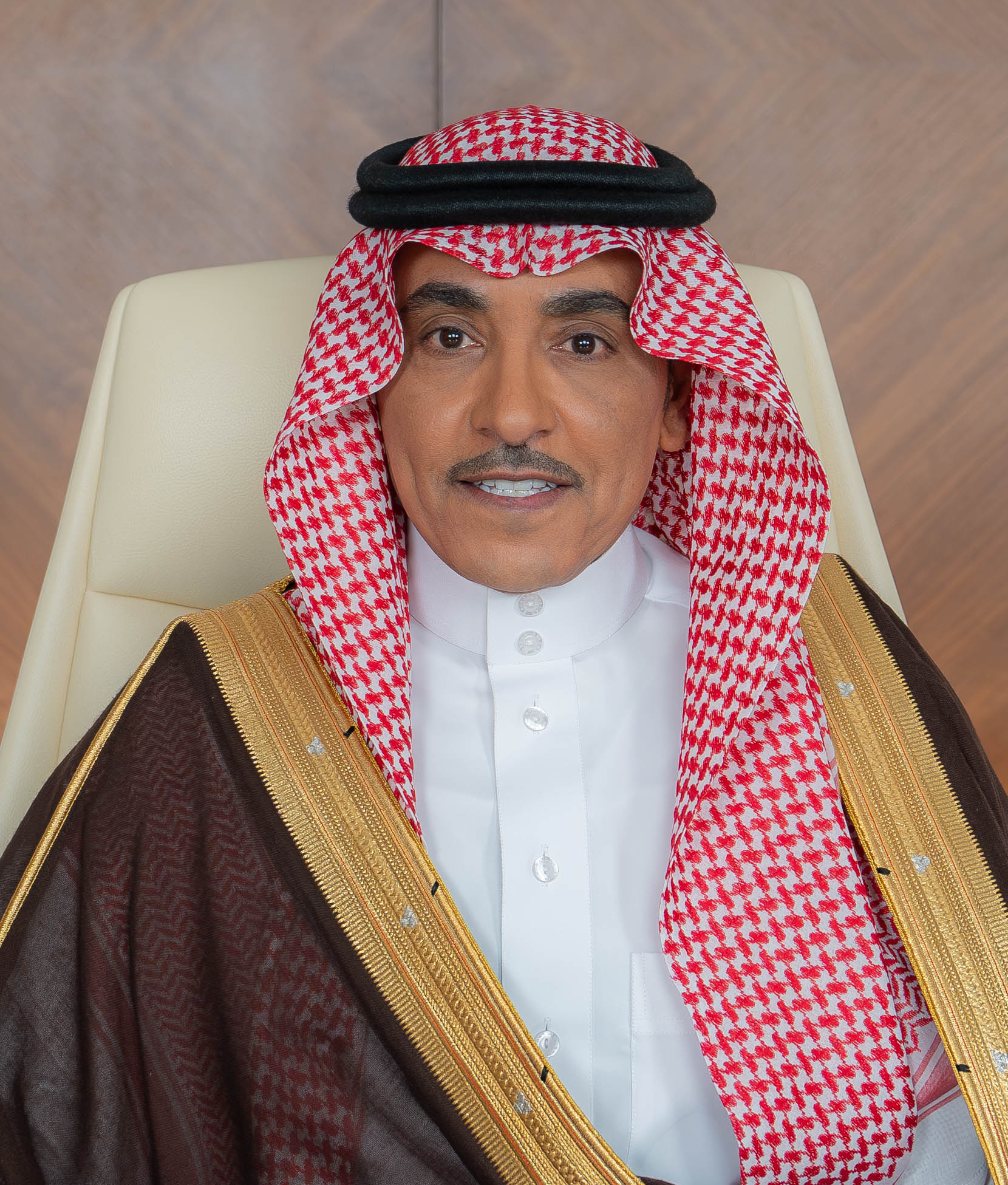
- Salman bin Yousuf, the current Minister of Media since 5 March 2023

Agency overview
- Formed: 5 March 1963; 63 years ago
- Preceding agency: General Directorate of Broadcasting, Press, and Publication (1955 – 1963)
- Jurisdiction: Government of Saudi Arabia
- Headquarters: Riyadh
- Minister responsible: Salman bin Yousuf
- Child agencies: Saudi Press Agency; General Authority of Media Regulation; Center for Government Communication; Saudi Broadcasting Authority
- Website: media.gov.sa/en

The Ministry of Media (Note: Arabic: وزارة الإعلام) is a government ministry in Saudi Arabia responsible for regulating the media sector, supervising state media, and overseeing public information and communications.

== History ==
The ministry was founded in 1962 as the ministry of information. The first minister of information was Jamil Ibrahim Hejailan who held the post between March 1963 and December 1970. Successor of Hejailan in the post was Ibrahim Al Angari. In 2003, its portfolio was expanded to include cultural affairs and was renamed as the ministry of culture and information. Later, on 1 June 2018 the culture was separated from the media resulting in two different ministries: Ministry of Culture and Ministry of Media.

Iyad bin Amin Madani served in the post between February 2005 and 14 February 2009. His successor was Abdulaziz Khoja. Khoja's appointment was regarded as part of the then King Abdullah's reform initiatives. His tenure as the minister of culture and information ended on 8 December 2014 when Abdulaziz Alkhedheiri was appointed to the post. On 29 January 2015 Adel Al Toraifi was appointed to the post.

On 22 April 2017, Awwad Alawwad was appointed as minister. His primary mandate is to revitalize the culture and media industries at home, support government communications abroad and strengthen Saudi Arabia’s cultural relations around the world.

On 27 December 2018, Turki Al-Shabana was appointed minister of media replacing Awwad Alawwad in the post who was appointed as a court advisor.

On 25 February 2020, Majid Al Qasabi was appointed by royal decree as minister of media replacing Turki Al-Shabana.

== Organization and activities ==
=== Censorship ===
The ministry has "responsibility for all the Saudi media and other channels of information". The ministry has been called the "main agent of censorship" in the kingdom. It is charged with the purification of culture prior to it being permitted circulation to the public. A special unit, the management of publications department, "analyzes all publications and issues directives to newspapers and magazines" stating that way in which a given topic must be treated.

Censorship is strict enough for works of the minister of culture and information himself: the former minister Abdulaziz Khojah's own works of poetry were banned in Saudi Arabia.

=== Other bodies ===
The ministry also oversees the activities of the following bodies: King Fahd Cultural Centre, Administration of Folklore, Saudi Society for Culture and Arts, General Administration of Cultural Activities and Literary Clubs, and General Administration for Literary Clubs. It is also responsible for the activities of the General Administration for Public Libraries and the General Administration for Cultural Relations. The Saudi Press Agency is also part of the ministry.

In London and Tunis, the ministry has information offices.

== See also ==
- Censorship in Saudi Arabia
- Mass media in Saudi Arabia
- Ministries of Saudi Arabia
- Television in Saudi Arabia
