= Riyadh Municipality =

Municipal body which administers the city of Riyadh in Saudi Arabia

- أمانة الرياض
- The official logo of Riyadh Municipality featuring the watchtowers of Al-Masmak Palace

Agency overview
- Formed: 1937; 88 years ago
- Jurisdiction: Government of Saudi Arabia
- Headquarters: Riyadh, Saudi Arabia
- Agency executive: Prince Faisal bin Abdulaziz bin Ayyaf, Mayor of Riyadh
- Parent department: Ministry of Municipal and Rural Affairs and Housing
- Website: www.alriyadh.gov.sa/ar

Riyadh Municipality (RM) (Arabic: أمانة الرياض, romanized: Amānat ar-Riyāḍ, lit. 'Protectorate of Riyadh'), officially the Riyadh Region Municipality or the Municipality of Riyadh, is a municipal body which has jurisdiction upon overall city services and the upkeep of facilities in Riyadh, Saudi Arabia and the Riyadh Governorate. Established in 1937 during the reign of King Abdulaziz ibn Saud, it comes under the Ministry of Municipal and Rural Affairs and Housing and is headed by the mayor of the city who is responsible for overseeing the city's 16 sub-municipalities (baladiyahs) and other towns and settlements in Riyadh Governorate.

== History ==
Riyadh Municipality was established in 1937 during the reign of King Abdulaziz and appointed Hassan Bukhari as the first "municipal director". In 1953, King Saud appointed Prince Fahd al-Faisal as the new mayor and amended the name "Municipality of Riyadh" in 1955.

== Functions of the municipal body ==
The functions and tasks of the municipality are defined by the Royal Decree No. M/5 dated 2/21/1397 (corresponding to February 9, 1977) issued during the reign of King Khalid bin Abdulaziz are:

- Organizing and coordinating the town according to an organizational scheme approved by the competent authorities.
- Licensing the construction of constructions and buildings, and all public and private extensions, and monitoring them.
- Maintaining the appearance and cleanliness of the town, establishing gardens, squares, parks and places of public tourism, organizing, managing, directly or indirectly, and monitoring them.
- Protecting the public environmental health within the city, filling in ponds and swamps, staving off the danger of torrential rains, and constructing fences of trees around the town to protect it from sand.
- Monitoring foodstuffs and consumer goods, supervising the citizens’ supply therein, monitoring their prices and the prices of public services, and monitoring scales or weights and measures in conjunction with the competent authorities.
- Establishment of slaughterhouses and their cleaning.
- Creating markets and defining selling positions.
- Licensing the practice of crafts and professions, opening public shops, and monitoring them healthily and technically.
- Maintaining safety and comfort, and in particular taking the necessary measures to prevent and extinguish fires, demolish dilapidated buildings or dilapidated parts, and establish public shelters.
- Determine the parking of street vendors, cars and vans.
- Organizing internal transportation and determining its fees in agreement with the competent authorities.
- Expropriation of real estate for the public benefit. Determining and collecting municipality fees and revenues, fines and penalties imposed on violators of its regulations.
- Supervising the elections and nomination of heads of trades and professions, monitoring their work and resolving disputes that may occur between them.
- Protecting archaeological buildings in cooperation with the competent authorities.
- Encouraging and participating in cultural, sports and social activities.
- Cooperating with the competent authorities to prevent beggary and vagrancy, and to establish shelters for the elderly, orphans, the insane, the handicapped, and the like.
- Establishment of tombs and laundries, fencing and cleaning them, and burying the dead.
- Avoiding damage to loose and broken animals and animal welfare.
- Preventing and removing encroachment on private or public property.
- Any other competencies issued by a decision of the Council of Ministers.

== Sub-municipalities ==
- Al-Shemal
- Al-Batha
- Al-Ulaya
- Irqah
- Al-Malaz
- Al-Rawdah
- Al-Naseem
- Al-Sulay
- Al-Ma'dher
- Al-Shumaisi
- Al-Namar
- Al-Aziziya
- Al-Urayja
- Al-Shifa
- Al-Hayir
- Al-Sharq
