= Al-Sharq Sub-Municipality =

Al-Sharq Sub-Municipality بلدية الشرق
- Baladiyah
- Country: Saudi Arabia
- City: Riyadh

Al-Sharq Sub-Municipality (Arabic: بلدية الشرق) or East Riyadh Municipality, is one of the 16 sub-municipalities of the Riyadh Municipality in Riyadh, Saudi Arabia. It covers 21 neighborhoods in eastern Riyadh and was established in 2019 after being carved out of the al-Naseem and al-Rawdah sub-municipalities. The sub-municipality is headquartered in al-Jenadriyah neighborhood.

== Neighborhoods and districts ==
- Al-Rimayah
- Al-Nuduwah
- Al-Jenadriyah
- Al-Nazeem
- Al-Wasaam
- Al-Bayan
- Al-Marjan
- Al-Sahab
- Al-Mashriq
- Al-Nujbah
- Al-Fursan
- Al-Ula
- Al-Zahir
- Al-Tazamun
- Al-Shola
- Al-Raiyah
- Al-Zuhoor
- Al-Risalah
- Al-Majd
- Al-Danah
- Al-Rahab
