= Muqrin =

Muqrin (Arabic: مقرن) is a masculine given name and surname of Arabic origin. Notable people with the name include:

== Given name ==
- Muqrin ibn Zamil (died 1521), ruler in Eastern Arabia
- Muqrin bin Abdulaziz Al Saud (born 1945), Saudi royal

== Surname ==
- Abdel Aziz al-Muqrin (1972–2004), member of Al Qaeda in the Arabian Peninsula
- Abdulaziz bin Mohammed bin Ayyaf Al Muqrin (born 1958), Saudi Arabian architect
- Al-Nu'man ibn Muqrin (died 641), companion of Muhammad
- Faisal bin Abdulaziz Al Muqrin, Saudi royal
- Muhammad bin Saud Al Muqrin (1687–1765), founder of the first Saudi state, Emirate of Diriyah
- Saud bin Muhammad Al Muqrin (1640–1726), emir of Diriyah
