= Faisal bin Abdulaziz Al Muqrin =

Saudi royal family member

Faisal bin Abdulaziz bin Ayyaf
- فيصل بن عبد العزيز بن محمد بن عيّاف
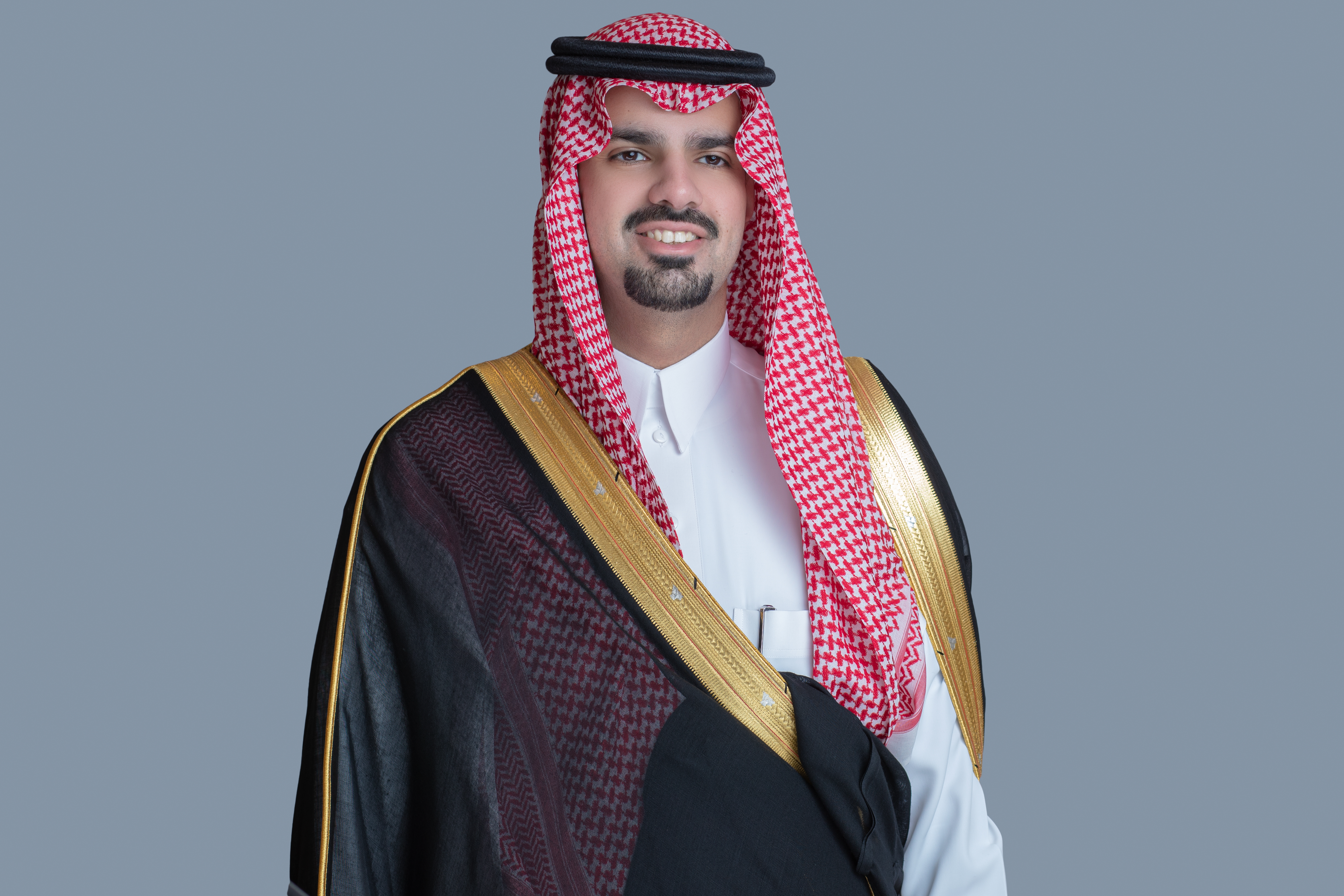

Mayor of Riyadh Region
- Incumbent
- Assumed office November 26, 2019
- Deputy: Mohammed bin Salman
- Leader: King Salman bin Abdulaziz

Personal details
- Education: King Saud University; Columbia University; Harvard University; University of California, Berkeley
- Website: https://princefaisal.alriyadh.gov.sa

Faisal bin Abdulaziz bin Mohammed bin Ayyaf Al-Muqrin is a Saudi Prince who has held the position of Mayor of Riyadh since November 26, 2019. He specializes in urban planning and management and holds a PhD in "Urban and Regional Planning and Management." His father, Prince Abdulaziz bin Mohammed bin Ayyaf Al-Muqrin, is an advisor to the Custodian of the Two Holy Mosques King Salman bin Abdulaziz, and Deputy Minister of the National Guard.

Prince Faisal chairs several organizations, companies, and boards of directors in addition to his current role. He also leads numerous councils and committees within the Kingdom of Saudi Arabia. With professional experience in urban development, he has worked with various companies both within Saudi Arabia and internationally. He has contributed to several projects at the Royal Commission for Riyadh City and collaborated with architectural firms in the United States, Canada, and France. He has also served as a lecturer and teaching assistant at Harvard University and King Saud University.

== Education ==
He earned a bachelor's degree with honors from the College of Architecture and Planning at King Saud University. He obtained a master's degree in Architecture and Urban Design from Columbia University in New York in 2014. In 2016, he completed a second master's degree in Urban Planning and Management at Harvard University. His research thesis was titled: "Urban Development and Management: Riyadh and Gulf Cities." He was awarded a PhD in "Urban and Regional Planning and Management" from the University of California, Berkeley, in 2023.

== Professional career ==
Prince Faisal served as an Urban Planning Consultant at the Royal Commission for Riyadh city and as a Design and Urban Studies Consultant at Skidmore, Owings & Merrill in the United States, among other roles in the urban planning field. He was appointed as Mayor of Riyadh by royal decree on November 26, 2019 (29 / 3 / 1441H). Riyadh Municipality is one of the largest in Saudi Arabia in terms of scope and jurisdiction, overseeing 63 municipalities across the Riyadh region, including cities, governorates, and districts. Prince Faisal has been committed to enhancing the municipality's operations, launching the Riyadh Humanization Project in several neighborhoods and restructuring the municipality with a new operational framework introduced in 2022.

Organizations and Companies

He chairs several organizations and companies, including:

- Chairman, Riyadh Holding Company.
- Chairman, Riyadh Development Company.
- Chairman, Rimat Riyadh Development Company
- Chairman, Infrastructure Projects Center, Riyadh Region
- Chairman, Arab Urban Development Institute.

Board Memberships and Committees

He has held several administrative positions on the boards of numerous companies and institutions, including:

- Board Member, Royal Commission for Riyadh City
- Member, Riyadh Regional Council
- Board Member, Diriyah Gate Development Authority.
- Board Member, Qiddiya Investment Company
- Executive Committee Member, New Murabba Development Company.
- Board Member, King Salman Park Foundation
- Board Member, Riyadh Non-Profit Foundation
- Board Member, Al-Soudah Development Company
- Board Member, Sports Boulevard Foundation.
- Board Member, Architecture and Design Arts Commission
- Board Member, King Salman International Airport Development Company
- Board Member, Riyadh Airlines
- Board of Trustees Member, Riyadh Charitable Foundation for Science
- Board Member, Tuwaiq Nature Reserve
- Board Member, Riyadh Holding Company for Investment and Development
- Board Member, Events Investment Fund
- Board Member, Premium Residency Center
- Steering Committee Member, Green Riyadh Project.

Councils and Committees in Riyadh Municipality

He has held several administrative positions in councils and committees at Riyadh Municipality, including:

- Chairman, Steering Committee, Riyadh Municipality.
- Chairman, Advisory Council, King Abdullah International Gardens.
- Chairman, Steering Council, Wadi Al-Sulay Program.
- Chairman, Steering Committee, Urban Landscape Improvement.
- Chairman, Steering Committee, Municipal Oversight.
- Chairman, Supervisory Committee, Privatization Projects.
- Chairman, Financial Sustainability Committee.
- Chairman, Digital Transformation Committee.
- Chairman, Planning and Development Committee.
- Chairman, Sub-Municipalities Committee.
- Chairman, Strategy and Institutional Transformation Committee.

== Publications ==
Prince Faisal has authored several books, research papers, articles, and publications, including:

Practical Urbanization: An Alternative Perspective on Planning in Riyadh. He also wrote a peer-reviewed article in the International Journal of Middle East Studies in 2017 titled "Reprioritizing the Human Element in Gulf Cities' Development."

He authored the book Turning Points... City Building in Riyadh and the Gulf, which was published by Tara Publishing in 2017.

He published a paper titled "A City in the Emerging Middle East" in the Harvard Graduate School of Design Exhibition in 2016.

He published Auditory and Visuals from St. Louis... Spatial Fluctuations in the Harvard Graduate School of Design Exhibition in 2016, and an article titled Urban Escape from Density in Topos 91 magazine in 2015.

He published Theories for a City of Appointments, which was part of the publications of a scientific forum and exhibition at the Ajman International Urban Planning Conference in 2015.

He published a Platform and Proposal for Rivière University City in the Harvard Graduate School of Design Exhibition and an academic book in 2015.

He also published an Urban Strategies Report for the Millennium Cities Initiative and Urban Design Lab in 2014, and a report titled An Alternative Future for New Rochelle in the Urban Design Lab and VOS NAS Foundation in 2014.
