= Digital City (Riyadh) =

Software technological park in Riyadh, Saudi Arabia

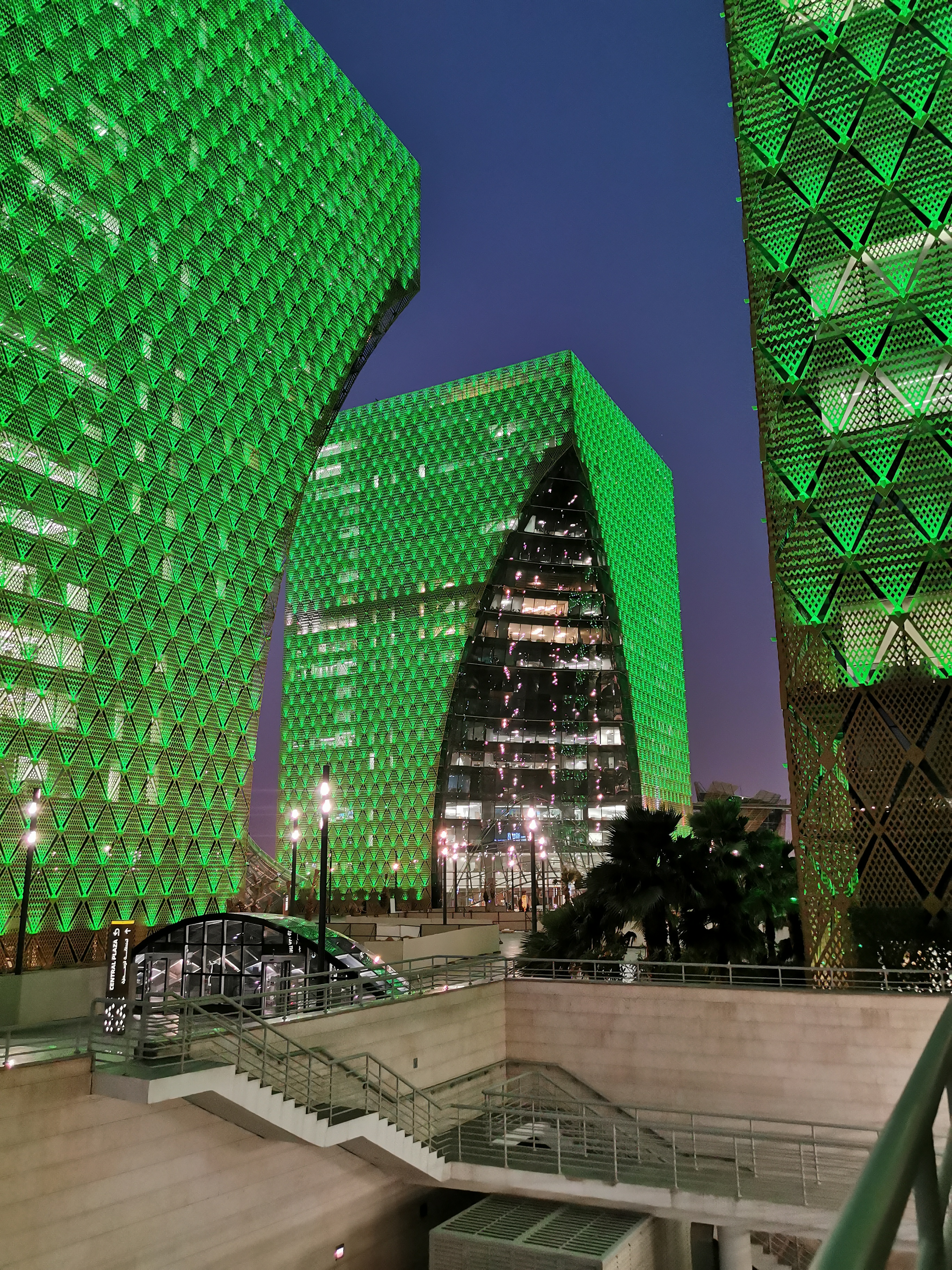
- Central Plaza, 2022
- Native name: المدينة الرقمية
- Formerly: Information Technology Communications Complex (ITCC); Al Raidah Digital City
- Industry: Information technology Business park
- Founded: 29 November 2005; 20 years ago
- Headquarters: Riyadh, Saudi Arabia
- Parent: Raza Company
- Website: digitalcity.com.sa

Digital City (Arabic: المدينة الرقمية), formerly Al-Raidah Digital City (Arabic: الرائدة المدينة الرقمية) and Information Technology Communications Complex (ITCC) (Arabic: مجمع تقنية المعلومات والاتصالات), is a mixed-use real-estate development and an information technology park in the al-Nakheel neighborhood of Riyadh, Saudi Arabia, located near the main campus of King Saud University. The project was the brainchild of Saudi Public Pension Agency and was announced in 2005 as the first smart city of Saudi Arabia, inspired from the model of Dubai Internet City. Opened in 2017, it covers an area of 470 acres, that includes office space tenanted by multinational technology companies and several government ministries. The complex also hosts multiple retail outlets, hospitality and residential areas.

== History ==
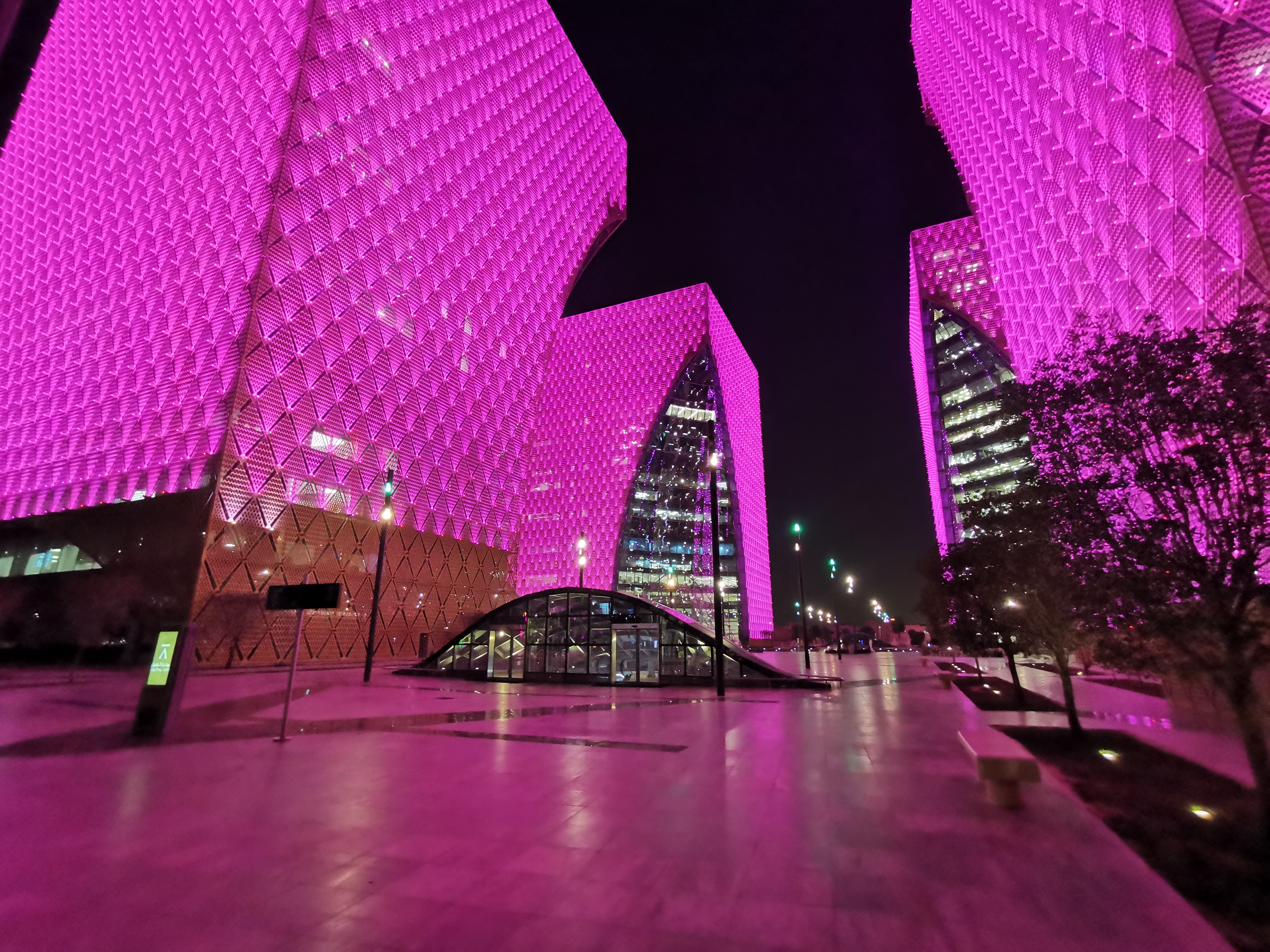
The Digital City at night, 2023

On 29 November 2005, the Royal Commission for Riyadh City approved the project of establishing a science park on a land owned by the Public Pension Agency. In April 2006, the Royal Commission for Riyadh City and the Riyadh Chamber of Commerce conducted a joint study to establish a science park in Riyadh. The license for the project was approved on 12 June 2006 by the Royal Commission for Riyadh City and by the Saudi Authority for Industrial Cities and Technology Zones on 27 July 2006, with the latter also taking part in overseeing its construction as one of the two technology zones in the Saudi capital, other being Riyadh Techno Valley.

The master plan for ITCC was designed by a joint venture between Saudi-based Zuhair Fayez and Singapore-based Jurong International. In April 2008, Raidah awarded 65 million usd contract to El-Seif Engineering for construction of infrastructure, which included a sewage treatment plant and a concrete-encased optic fiber cable network. The ITCC's four 20-story towers in the central plaza was designed by Al Rajhi Projects and Dubai-based Al-Habtoor Leighton Group. Construction for the first phase, which included building the four 20-storey towers, began in 2009 and was completed by 2012.

The second phase of the project commenced in 2012. As of 2016, the complex was still under development in its second phase. In October 2017, a new passports division was installed. In June 2018, the Saudi Telecom Company inaugurated a data center in the complex. By the end of 2019, the project delivered 2250 residential units. In November 2019, the complex hosted the first edition of an international taste festival that included several restaurants with Michelin star ratings. In December 2020, Spar Saudi Stores Company, a company of Al-Sadhan Group, opened an express convenience store in Riyadh's Digital City. In March 2021, the complex hosted the Noor Riyadh events. In April 2022, the General Presidency for the Promotion of Virtue and Prevention of Vices installed over 50 billboards in the complex. In October 2023, the test drive for Chery's Omoda C5 was conducted in the presence of personnel from the Saudi Ministry of Culture and officials from the Chinese diplomatic mission in Saudi Arabia. In November 2023, The Saudi Health Ministry organized the Walk30 event in the complex.
