= Al Namar Sub-Municipality =

Baladiyah Al-Namar بلدية نمار
- Baladiyah
- Country: Saudi Arabia
- City: Riyadh
- Website: nmar.alriyadh.gov.sa

Baladiyah al-Namar (Arabic: بلدية نمار), officially the Al-Namar Sub-Municipality and formerly the Utayqah Municipality, is one of the 16 baladiyahs of Riyadh, Saudi Arabia. It consists of 6 neighborhoods and is responsible for their development, planning and maintenance.

== Neighborhoods and districts ==
- Al-Namar
- Hajrah Laban (partially)
- Zahrah Namar
- Dirab
- Urayja al-Gharbi
- Al-Hazm
