= Al Hayir Sub-Municipality =

Al Hayir Sub-Municipality بلدية الحائر
- Baladiyah
- Country: Saudi Arabia
- City: Riyadh
- Website: haier.alriyadh.gov.sa

Baladiyah al-Hayir (Arabic: بلدية الحائر), officially the Al-Hayir Sub-Municipality is one of the 16 baladiyahs of Riyadh, Saudi Arabia. It includes 5 neighborhoods and is responsible for their planning, maintenance and development.

== Neighborhoods and districts ==
- Al-Ghanamiyah
- Al-Ha'ir
- Al-Arayiz
- Umm Sha'al
- Al-Sidrah
