= Royal Commission for Riyadh City =

Upper governing body responsible for Riyadh, Saudi Arabia

- الهيئة الملكية لمدينة الرياض

Agency overview
- Formed: 20 June 1974 (as the Riyadh Development Authority); 30 August 2019 (reconstituted as the Royal Commission for Riyadh City)
- Jurisdiction: Government of Saudi Arabia
- Headquarters: Riyadh
- Website: www.rcrc.gov.sa

The Royal Commission for Riyadh City (RCRC) is the upper-level government authority responsible for the strategic planning and development of Riyadh, the capital of Saudi Arabia. It works alongside the Riyadh Municipality, which functions as the city's lower-level municipal authority and is responsible for local municipal administration and services.

== History ==
The Royal Commission for Riyadh City was established during the reign of King Faisal as the High Commission for the Development of Arriyadh through a resolution of the Council of Ministers decree No. 717, dated 20 June 1974 (29/05/1394H) to realize the will of the Custodian of the Two Holy Mosques to establish a joint authority that leads, supervises and orchestrates the comprehensive development of the city of Riyadh. Arriyadh Development Authority (ARA) was formed on 13 June 1983 (02/09/1403H) as the High Commission's executive, technical and administrative arm. In August 2019 (29/12/1440H), the High Commission and the ARA were transformed into the Royal Commission for Riyadh City.

== Responsibilities ==
The Royal Commission for Riyadh will take the responsibilities of Riyadh Development Authority. These responsibilities include setting up the policies for the metropolitan development as well as supervising the strategic programs and plans from the study to the implementation.

== Main projects ==
There are various projects developed by the commission including:

- King Abdulaziz Project for Riyadh Public Transport.
- Historical Addir'iyah Development Program.
- Wadi Namar and Wadi Laban Environmental Rehabilitation Project.
- King Abdulaziz Historical Center Project.
- Saudi Railway .
