= King Salman International Airport =

Planned international airport serving Riyadh, Saudi Arabia

King Salman International Airport مطار الملك سلمان الدولي
- IATA: none; ICAO: none

Summary
- Airport type: Public
- Owner/Operator: King Salman International Airport Development Company
- Serves: Riyadh Province
- Location: Riyadh, Saudi Arabia
- Hub for: Saudia; Riyadh Air
- Elevation AMSL: 2,049 ft (625 m)
- Coordinates: 24°57′28″N 046°41′56″E
- Website: www.ksia.sa

Map
- Location of airport in Saudi Arabia King Salman International Airport (Asia)

King Salman International Airport (Note: Arabic: مطار الملك سلمان الدولي (romanized: Maṭār al-Malik Salmān ad-Duwalī)) (IATA: none, ICAO: none) is an international airport under construction serving Riyadh, the capital of Saudi Arabia. It would succeed the current King Khalid International Airport, and would be built around it. The airport is being designed by architectural firm Foster + Partners.

== History ==
To accommodate the increasing number of travelers into and out of the kingdom, and to improve socio-economic development and boost tourism in Saudi Arabia, a sector on which the Saudi Arabia has laid a strong emphasis by realising its potential since the last decade, in December 2022, the Crown Prince of Saudi Arabia, Mohammed bin Salman, proposed the plan of building a new airport with the goal of boosting tourism in Saudi Arabia, by expanding the existing King Khalid International Airport, as part of Saudi Arabia's Vision 2030. The airport’s vice president is business man Marco Mejia.

== Facilities ==
The airport includes six passenger terminals, an iconic terminal, a private aviation terminal and six runways among other facilities and amenities. The airport covers an area of 57 km^{2} (22 mi^{2}) and wants to handle 100 million passengers per year by 2030, and 185 million passengers per year by 2050. It also aims to handle 3.5 million tonnes of cargo per year by 2050. It is planned to rely renewable energy, and plans to get a LEED Platinum Certification. It is being designed by the British architectural firm, Foster + Partners and engineering consultancy Jacobs, and is planned to have a single concourse area with a loop to connect other terminals, along with multiple entrances and exits. It is planned to also include 11 km^{2} (4.2 mi^{2}) reserved for retail and office space. It aims to be among the world's largest airports.

== See also ==
- Transport in Saudi Arabia
- List of airports in Saudi Arabia
