= Abdulaziz bin Mohammed bin Ayyaf Al Muqrin =

Saudi Arabian politician

His Excellency Abdulaziz bin Mohammed bin Ayyaf Al Muqrin
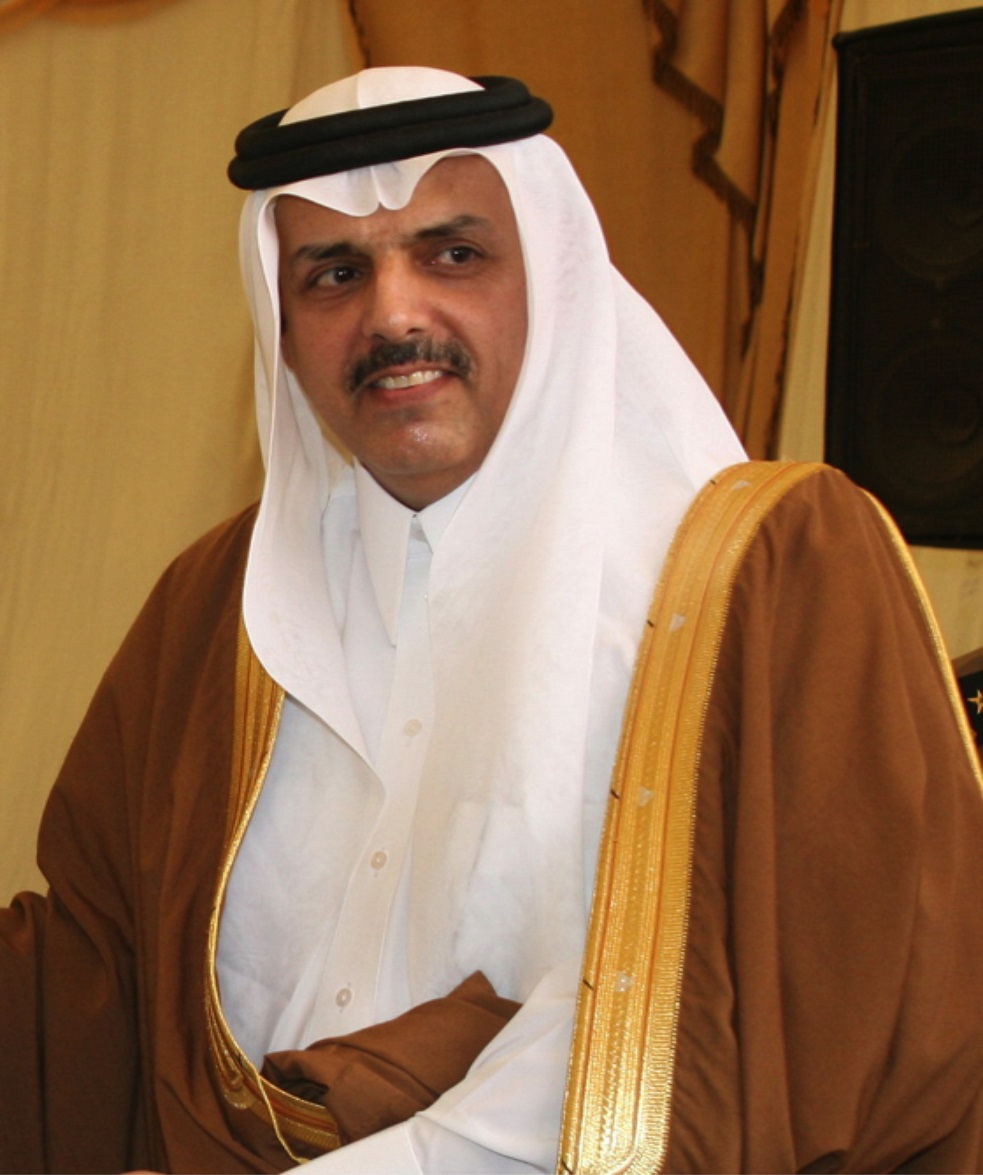

Mayor of Riyadh
- In office 1997 – 24 June 2012
- Appointed by: King Fahd
- Preceded by: Eng. Mossaed Abdul Rahman Al Angari
- Succeeded by: Eng. Abdullah al-Mogbel
- Monarchs: Fahd; Abdullah

Personal details
- Born: 1958 (age 67–68) Riyadh, Saudi Arabia
- Education: King Saud University; University of Pennsylvania

Prince Abdulaziz bin Mohammed bin Ayyaf Al Muqrin or Al-Migrin (Arabic: عبد العزيز بن محمد بن عياف آل مقرن; born 1958) is a Saudi Arabian architect, philanthropist, politician and a member of the Muqrin clan, from which the ruling family is branched who was the fifth mayor of Riyadh from 1997 till 24 June 2012. He currently serves as the chairman of the board of trustees at Prince Sultan University and King Salman Center for Local Governance and as the vice chairman of the board of directors of the Riyadh Science Foundation. In June 2023, he has been appointed as Deputy Defence Minister of Saudi Arabia.

== Honours and awards ==
- Order of King Abdulaziz (2002)
