= Al Naseem Sub-Municipality =

Baladiyah al-Naseem بلدية النسيم
- Baladiyah
- Country: Saudi Arabia
- City: Riyadh
- Website: naseem.alriyadh.gov.sa

Al-Naseem Sub-Municipality (Arabic: بلدية النسيم) is one of the 16 baladiyahs of Riyadh, Saudi Arabia. It includes 8 neighborhoods and is responsible for their development, planning and maintenance.

== Neighborhoods and districts ==
- Al-Rayyan
- Al-Rawabi
- Al-Salam
- Al-Manar
- Al-Naseem al-Gharbi
- Al-Naseem al-Sharqi
- Al-Rimayah
- Al-Nazim
