= Riyadh =

Capital and largest city of Saudi Arabia

Riyadh الرياض
- Capital city
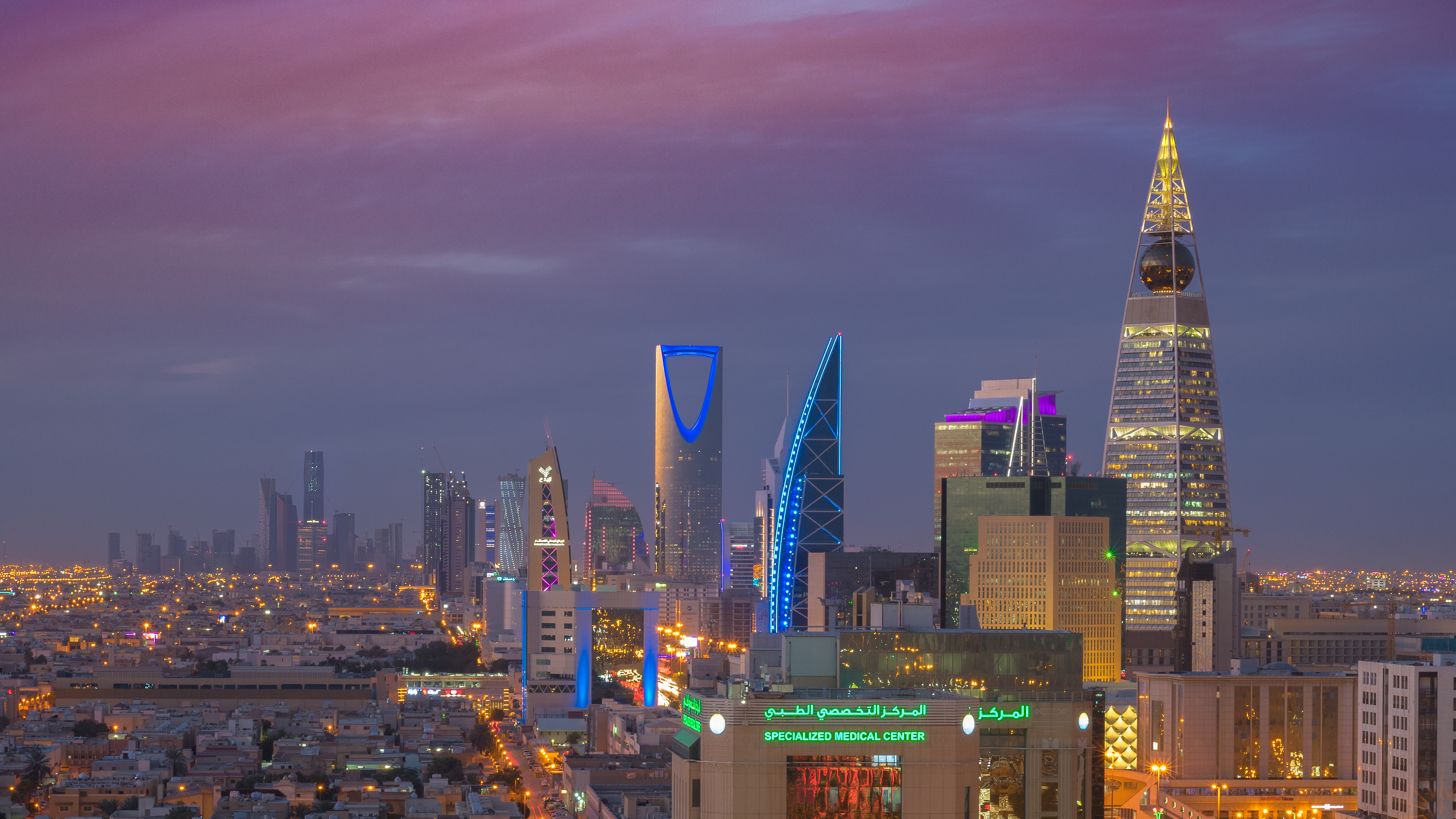
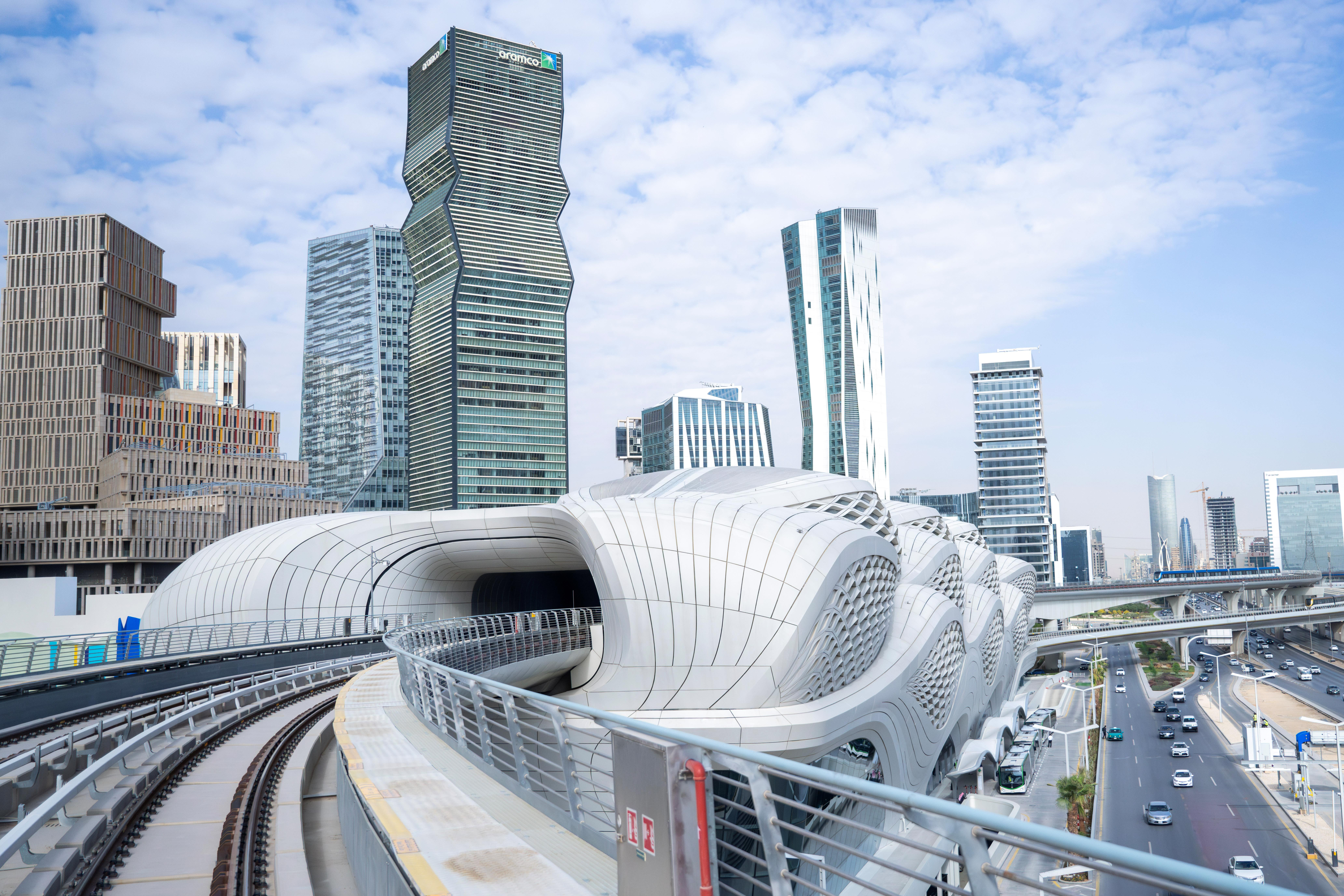
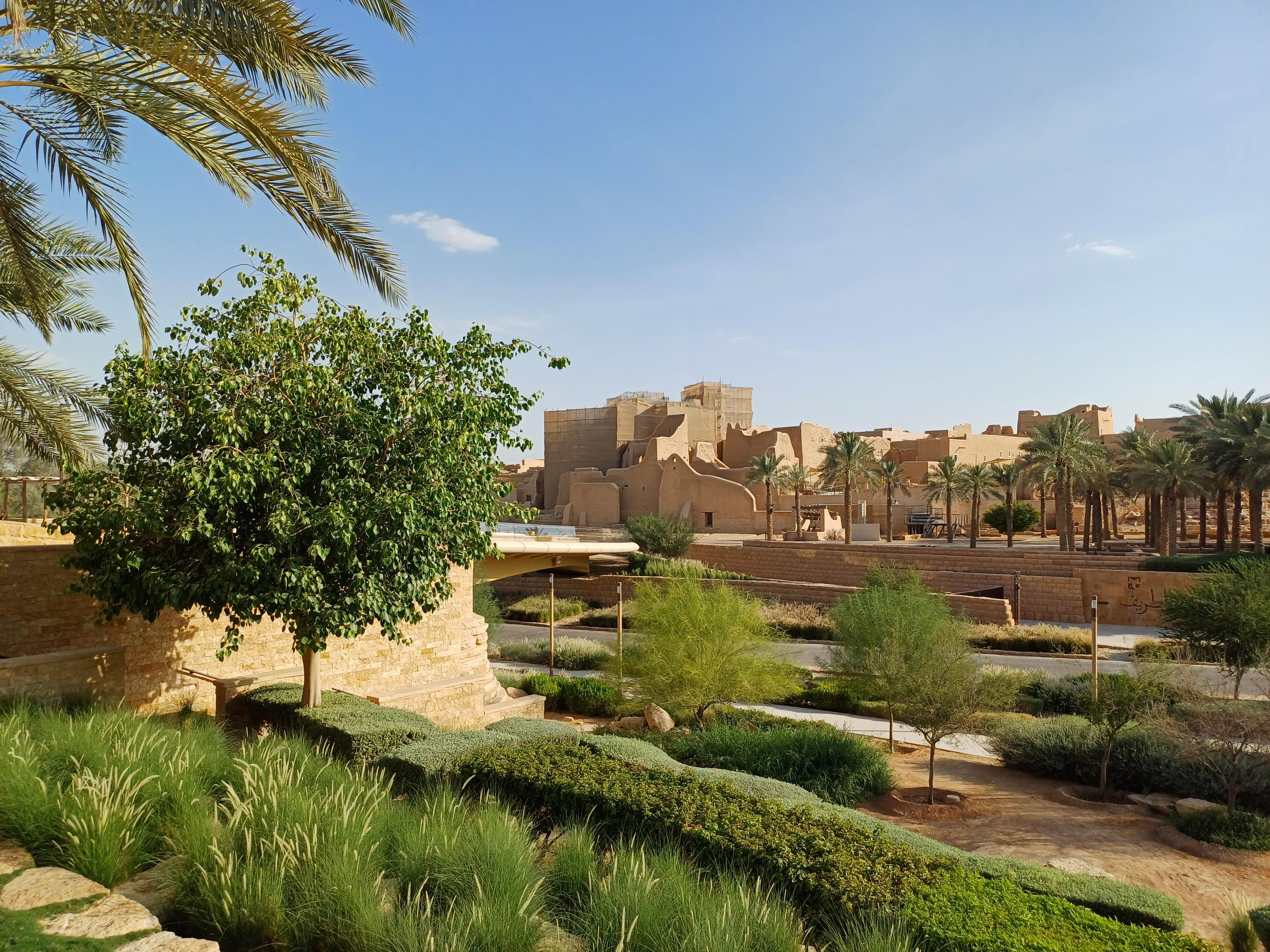
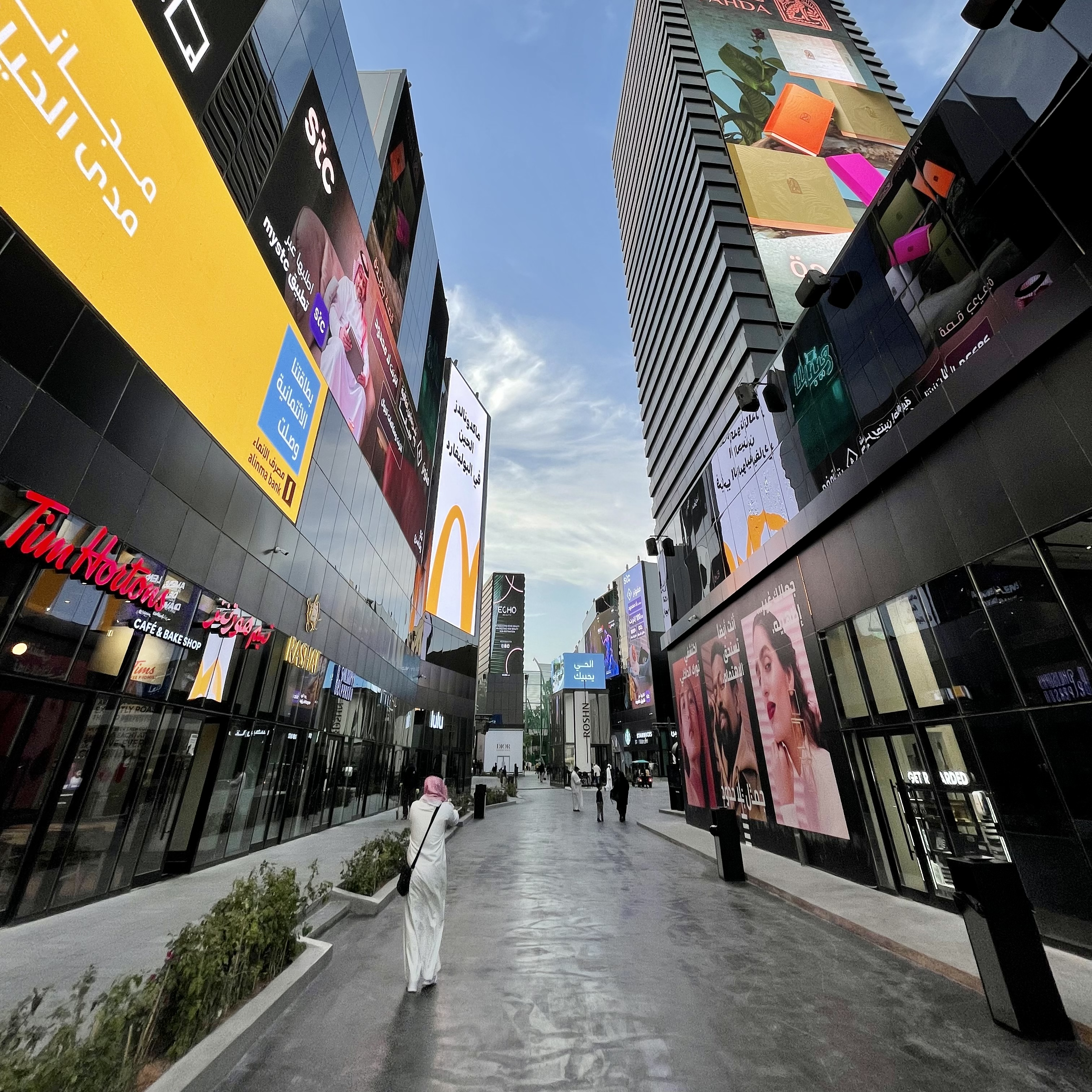
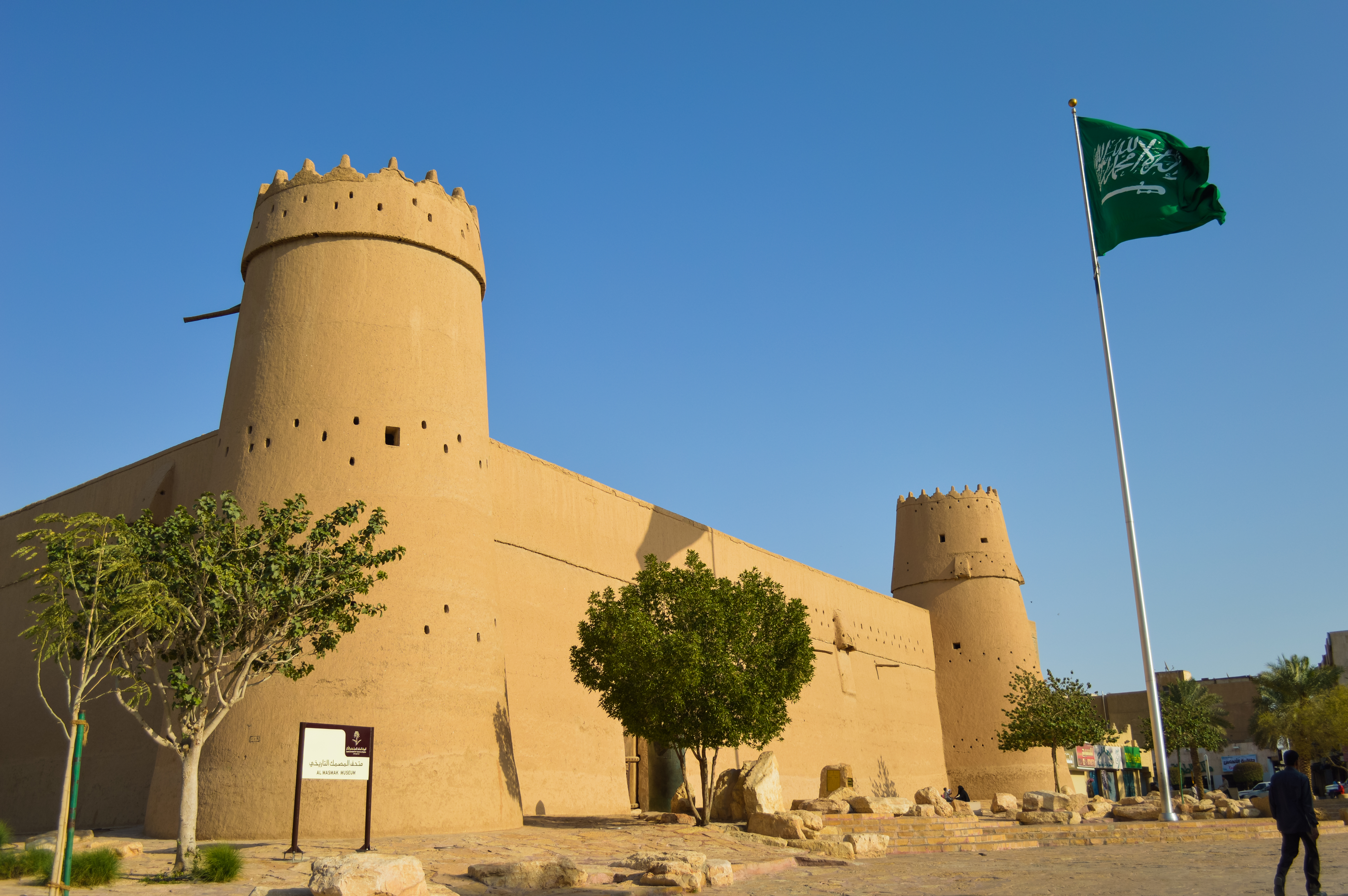
- Al-Olaya District KAFD Station ad-Dir'iyah Boulevard City Al-Masmak Palace

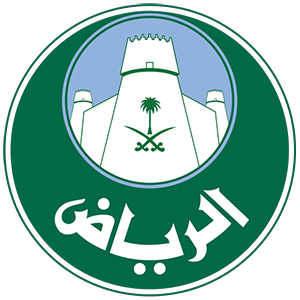
- Seal

- Location of Riyadh within Saudi Arabia Riyadh (Asia)
- Coordinates: 24°38′18″N 46°42′54″E
- Country: Saudi Arabia
- Province: Riyadh Province
- Emirate: Riyadh Emirate
- Region: Najd Region
- First mentioned: 1590; 436 years ago
- First established: 1746; 280 years ago

Government
  - Type: Royal Commission / Municipality
  - Body: Riyadh City Royal Commission (Upper body); Riyadh Municipality (Lower body)
  - Governor: Faisal bin Bandar
  - Deputy Governor: Mohammed bin Abdulrahman
  - Mayor: Faisal bin Abdulaziz

Area
  - Capital city: 1,973 km^{2} (762 sq mi)
- Elevation: 612 m (2,008 ft)

Population (2022)
  - Capital city: 7,009,100
  - Rank: 1st
  - Density: 3,553/km^{2} (9,201/sq mi)
  - Metro: 7,820,551

GDP (Gross domestic product)
  - Year: 2023
  - Total (Metro): $428.7 billion
  - Per capita: $55,800
- Time zone: UTC+03:00 (SAST)
- Postal Code: (5 digits)
- Area code: 011
- HDI (2023): 0.924 – very high
- Website: alriyadh.gov.sa

Riyadh (Note: UK: /ˈriːæd/ REE-yad, US: /riːˈjɑːd/ ree-YAHD; Arabic: الرِّيَاض, romanized: ar-Riyāḍ, standard pronunciation: [ar.riˈjaːdˤ], Najdi pronunciation: [er.rɪˈjɑːðˤ]; lit. 'the Meadows') is the capital and largest city of Saudi Arabia, as well as the largest city on the Arabian Peninsula. It serves as the administrative capital of both the Riyadh Province and the Riyadh Emirate. It has been the Saudi capital since 1824, when it was designated as the seat of the Second Saudi State, the current form of the metropolis largely emerged in the 1950s as an expansion of the 18th-century walled town, following the dismantling of its defensive fortifications.

== Overview ==
It is the largest city on the Arabian Peninsula and is situated in the eastern part of the Najd plateau. The city sits at an average elevation of 600 meters (2,000 ft) above sea level, and receives around 5 million tourists each year, making it the forty-ninth most visited city in the world and the sixth in the Middle East. Riyadh had a population of 7 million people in 2022, making it the most populous city in Saudi Arabia, the fifth most populous in the Middle East, and the 38th most populous in Asia.

The first mention of the city by the name Riyadh was in 1590, by an Arab chronicler. In 1745, Dahham ibn Dawwas, who was from the neighboring Manfuhah, seized control of the town. Dahham built a mudbrick palace and a wall around the town, and the best-known source of the name Riyadh is from this period, thought to be referring to the earlier oasis towns that predated the wall built by Ibn Dawwas. In 1744, Muhammad ibn Abd al-Wahhab formed an alliance with the Emir of Diriyah, Muhammad bin Saud, and they took Riyadh from Dahham. However their state, now known as the First Saudi state, collapsed in 1818. Turki ibn Abdullah founded the Second Saudi state in the early 19th century and made Riyadh his capital in 1825. However, his reign over the city was disrupted by a joint Ottoman– Rashidi alliance. Finally, in the early 20th century, Ibn Saud retrieved his ancestral rule in 1902 with the Emirate of Riyadh and consolidated his rule by 1926 with the final Saudi conquest of Hejaz, subsequently naming his kingdom 'Saudi Arabia' in September 1932 with Riyadh as the capital. The town was the administrative center of the government until 1938, when Ibn Saud moved to the Murabba Palace. In the 1950s, the walls were dismantled and the Riyadh metropolis expanded as an offshoot of the walled town.

Riyadh is the political and administrative center of Saudi Arabia. The Consultative Assembly, the Council of Ministers, the king and the Supreme Judicial Council are all situated in the city. Alongside these four bodies that form the core of the legal system of Saudi Arabia, the headquarters of other major and minor governmental bodies are also located in Riyadh. Out of the 24 ministries of the Saudi government, 23 are headquartered in Riyadh, further reinforcing its status as the nation's administrative capital. The city hosts 114 foreign embassies, most of which are located in the Diplomatic Quarter in the western reaches of the city.

Riyadh also holds economic significance, as it contains the headquarters of many banks and major companies, such as the Saudi National Bank, Alrajhi Bank, SABIC, Almarai, STC Group, and MBC Group, In addition to its strong local presence, Riyadh has also attracted major international investment. Global companies such as Lenovo, Google, Amazon, Samsung, and Philips have moved their regional headquarters to the city. In total, over 500 foreign companies have relocated their regional bases to Riyadh, reinforcing its growing status as a regional business hub, and Highway 65, known locally as the King Fahd Road, runs through some of these important centers in the city, including the King Abdullah Financial District, one of the world's largest financial districts, the Al-Faisaliah Tower and the Kingdom Center. Riyadh is one of the world's fastest-growing cities in population and is home to many expatriates.

The city is divided into fifteen municipal districts, which are overseen by the Municipality of Riyadh, headed by the mayor, and the Royal Commission for Riyadh City which is chaired by the governor of the province, Faisal bin Bandar. As of July 2020, the mayor is Faisal bin Abdulaziz. Riyadh will host Expo 2030, becoming the second Arab city to host after Dubai in 2020.

On the outskirts of Riyadh is Diriyah, one of the most historically important places in Saudi Arabia and the original home of the ruling House of Saud and the site of At-Turaif Palace, a UNESCO heritage site. Diriyah today is also one of Saudi Arabia's flagship Vision 2030 projects. In the 18th century, Diriyah was the capital of the First Saudi State and is often described as "where Saudi Arabia began."

== History ==
=== Early history ===
During the Pre-Islamic era, the city at the site of modern Riyadh was called Hajr (Arabic: حجر), and was reportedly founded by the tribe of Banu Hanifa. Hajr served as the capital of the province of Al-Yamama, whose governors were responsible for most of central and eastern Arabia during the Umayyad Caliphate and Abbasid Caliphate eras. Al-Yamama broke away from the Abbasid in 866 and the area fell under the rule of the Banu Ukhaidhir, who moved the capital from Hajr to nearby Al-Kharj. The city then went into a long period of decline. In the 14th century, North African traveler Ibn Battuta wrote of his visit to Hajr, describing it as "the main city of Al-Yamama, and its name is Hajr". Ibn Battuta goes on to describe it as a city of canals and trees with most of its inhabitants belonging to the Banu Hanifa, and reports that he continued on with their leader to Mecca to perform the Hajj.

Later on, Hajr broke up into several separate settlements and estates. The most notable of these were Migrin (or Muqrin) and Mi'kal, though the name Hajr continued to appear in local folk poetry. The earliest known reference to the area by the name Riyadh comes from a 17th-century chronicler reporting on an event from the year 1590. In 1737, Dahham ibn Dawwas, a refugee from neighboring Manfuhah, took control of Riyadh. Ibn Dawwas built a single wall to encircle the various oasis towns in the area, making them effectively a single fortress city. The name "Riyadh", meaning "gardens," refers to these earlier oasis towns.

=== Economy ===
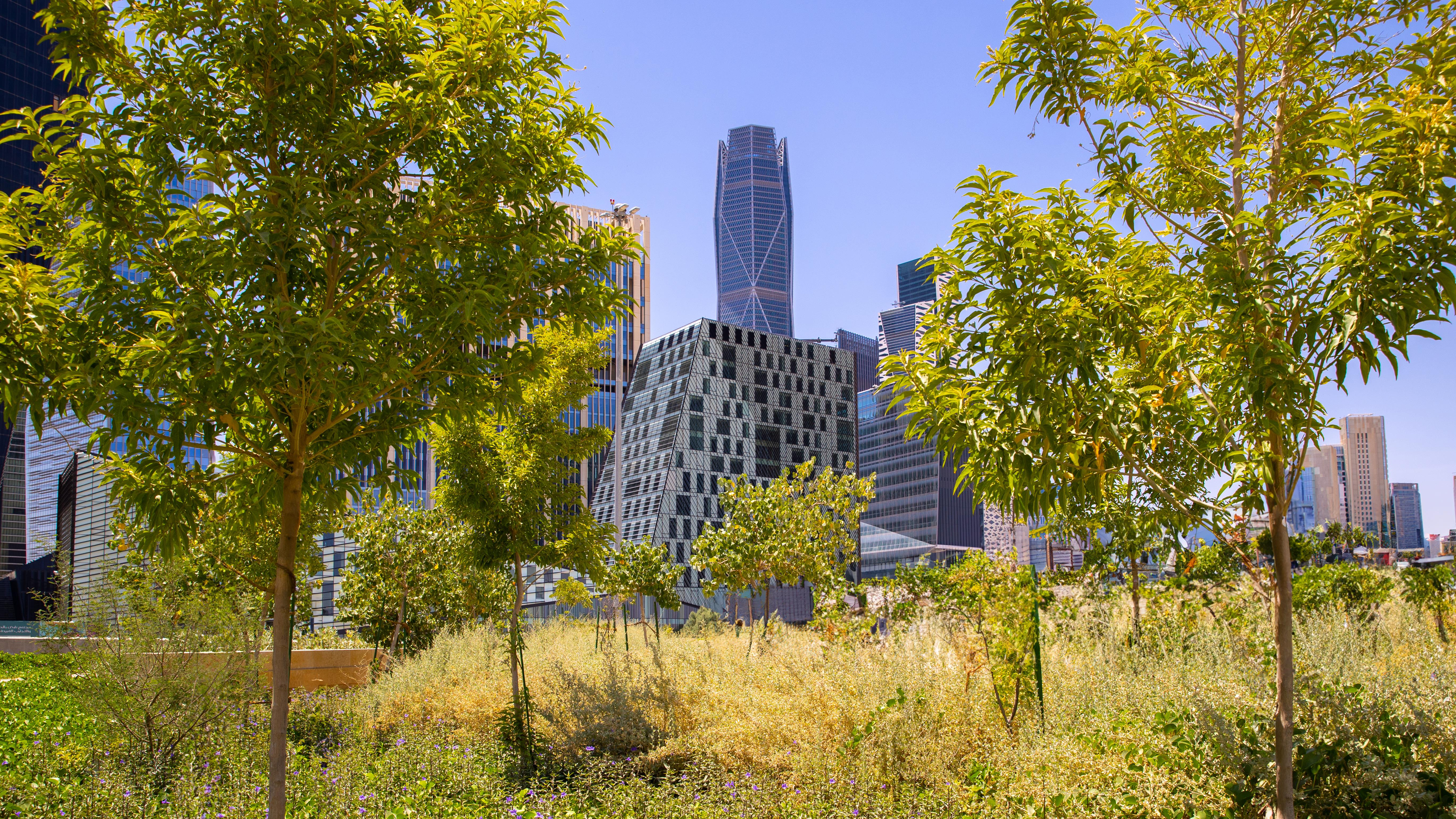
King Abdullah Financial District

The capital of Saudi Arabia, Riyadh, was initially known for its availability of water and fertile land which made it ideal for farming dates and other crops, Wheat was also widely grown until the crops were infested with insects and mites. After Riyadh was designated as the capital in the mid-1900s, Riyadh became a manufacturing hub. Almost one-third of Saudi Arabia's factories are located in Riyadh, producing a range of products including machinery, equipment, metallurgical goods, chemicals, construction materials, food, textiles, furniture, and numerous publications.

=== First Saudi State ===
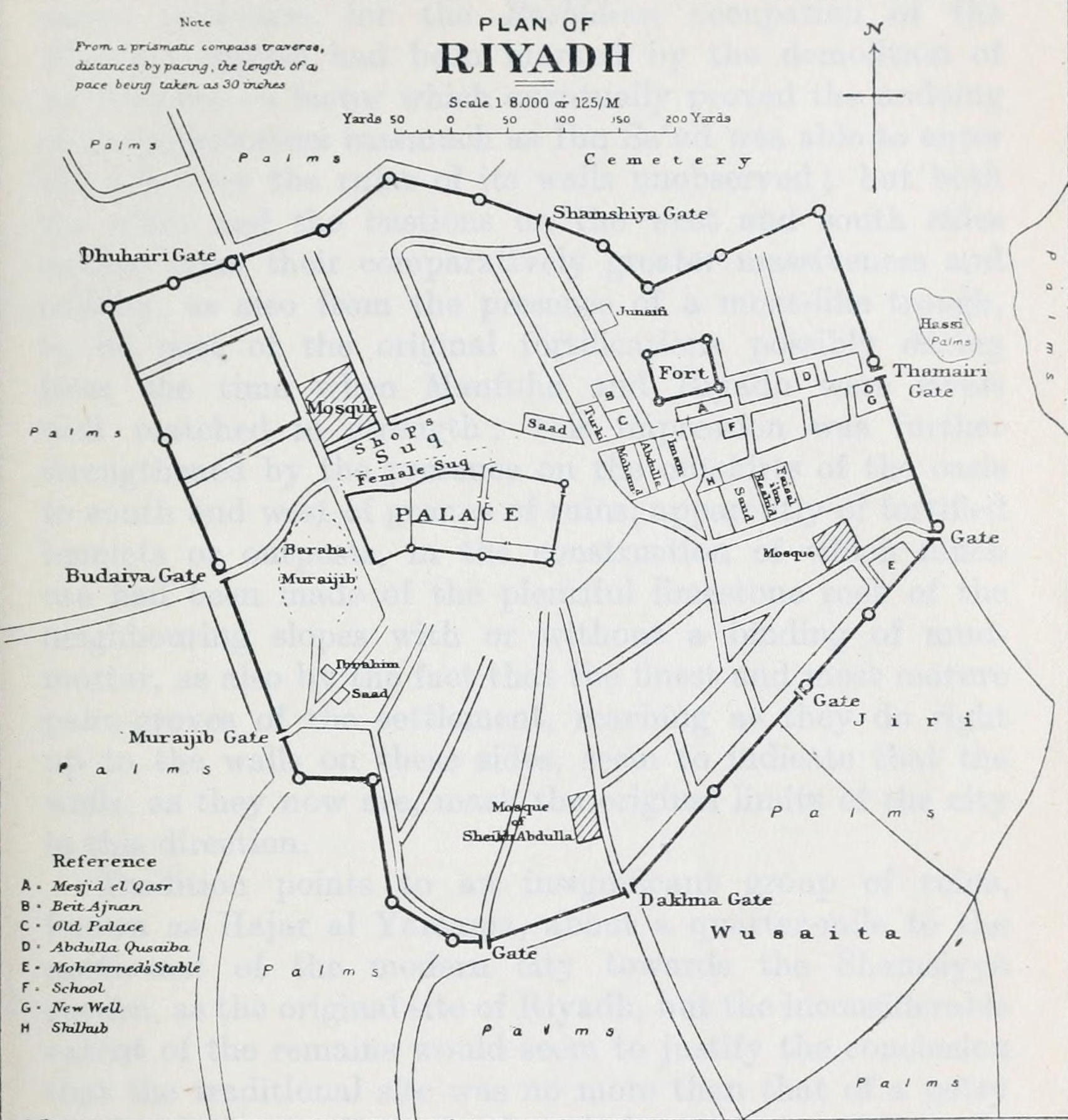
1922 map of the walled town of Riyadh

In 1744, Muhammad ibn Abd al-Wahhab formed an alliance with Muhammad bin Saud, the ruler of the nearby town of Diriyah. Ibn Saud then set out to conquer the surrounding region with the goal of bringing it under the rule of a single Islamic state. Ibn Dawwas of Riyadh led the most determined resistance, allied with forces from Al-Kharj, Al-Ahsa, and the Banu Yam clan of Najran. However, Ibn Dawwas fled and Riyadh capitulated to the Saudis in 1774, ending long years of wars, and leading to the declaration of the First Saudi state, with Diriyah as its capital.

The First Saudi State was ended by forces sent by Muhammad Ali of Egypt, acting on behalf of the Ottoman Empire. Ottoman forces razed the Saudi capital Diriyah in 1818. They had maintained a garrison at Najd. This marked the decline of the House of Saud for a short time. Turki bin Abdullah became the first ruler of the Second Saudi state; the cousin of Saud bin Saud, he ruled for 19 years till 1834, leading to the consolidation of the area though they were notionally under the control of Muhammad Ali, the Viceroy of Egypt. In 1823, Turki ibn Abdallah chose Riyadh as the new capital. Following the assassination of Turki in 1834, his eldest son Faisal killed the assassin, took control of the capital, and refused to be controlled by the Viceroy of Egypt. Najd was then invaded, and Faisal was taken captive and held in Cairo. However, as Egypt became independent of the Ottoman Empire, Faisal escaped after five years of incarceration, returned to Najd, and resumed his reign, ruling until 1865 and consolidating the reign of the House of Saud.

Following the death of Faisal, there was rivalry among his sons, which was exploited by Muhammad bin Rashid who took most of Najd, signed a treaty with the Ottomans, and also captured Al-Ahsa in 1871. In 1889, Abdul Rahman bin Faisal, the third son of Faisal again regained control over Najd and ruled till 1891, whereafter the control was regained by Muhammad bin Rashid.

Internecine struggles between Turki's grandsons led to the fall of the Second Saudi State in 1891 at the hand of the rival House of Rashid, which ruled from the northern city of Ha'il. The Al-Masmak Palace dates from that period.

Abdul Rahman bin Faisal al-Saud had sought refuge among a tribal community on the outskirts of Najd and then went to Kuwait with his family and stayed in exile. However, his son Ibn Saud retrieved his ancestral kingdom of Najd in 1902 and consolidated his rule by 1926, and further expanded his kingdom to cover "most of the Arabian Peninsula." He named his kingdom as Saudi Arabia in September 1932 with Riyadh as the capital. King Ibn Saud died in 1953 and his son Saud took control as per the established succession rule of father to son from the time Muhammad bin Saud had established the Saud rule in 1727. However, this established line of succession was broken when King Saud was succeeded by his brother King Faisal in 1964. In 1975, Faisal was succeeded by his brother King Khalid. In 1982, King Fahd took the reins from his brother. This new line of succession is among the sons of King Abdul Aziz who has 35 sons; this large family of Ibn Saud hold all key positions in the large kingdom.

=== Modern history ===
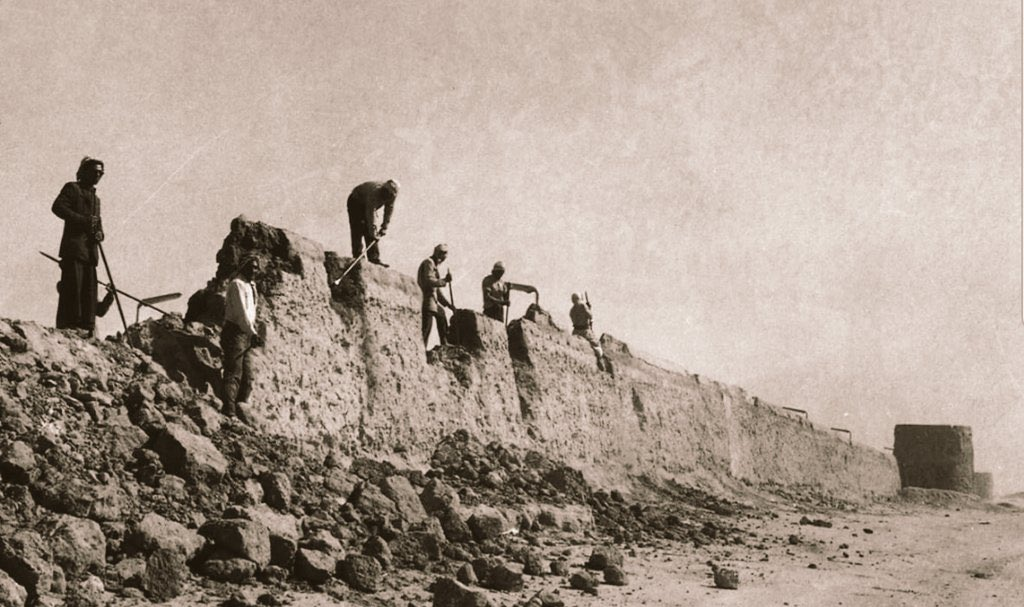
The demolition of the city walls in 1950 was a prelude to the expansion and modernization of the city.

From the 1940s, Riyadh mushroomed from a relatively narrow, spatially isolated town into a spacious metropolis. When King Saud came to power, he made it his objective to modernize Riyadh, and began developing Annasriyyah, the royal residential district, in 1950. Following the example of American cities, new settlements and entire neighborhoods were created on grid plans, and connected by high-capacity main roads to the inner areas. The grid pattern in the city was introduced in 1953. The population growth of the town from 1974 to 1992 averaged 8.2 percent per year.

The mayor is Prince Faisal bin Abdulaziz al-Muqrin. Al-Muqrin was appointed in 2019 by royal decree and succeeds Tariq bin Abdul Aziz Al-Faris. Riyadh is now the administrative and to a great extent the commercial hub of the Kingdom. According to the Saudi Real Estate Companion, most large companies in the country established either sole headquarters or a large office in the city. For this reason, there has been significant growth in high-rise developments in all areas of the city. Most notable among these is King Abdullah Financial District which is fast becoming the key business hub in the city. Riyadh also has the largest all-female university in the world, the Princess Nourah Bint Abdul Rahman University.

According to the Global Financial Centres Index, Riyadh ranked at 77 in 2016–2017. Though the rank moved up to 69 in 2018, diversification in the economy of the capital is required in order to avoid what the World Bank called a "looming poverty crisis" brought on by lingering low oil prices and rich state benefits.

Since 2017, Riyadh has been the target of missiles from Yemen. In March 2018, one person died as a result of a missile attack. The number of missiles which targeted Riyadh are a small portion of the dozens of missiles fired from Yemen at Saudi Arabia due to the Saudi-led intervention in the Yemeni civil war. In April 2018, heavy gunfire was heard in Khozama; this led to rumors of a coup attempt.

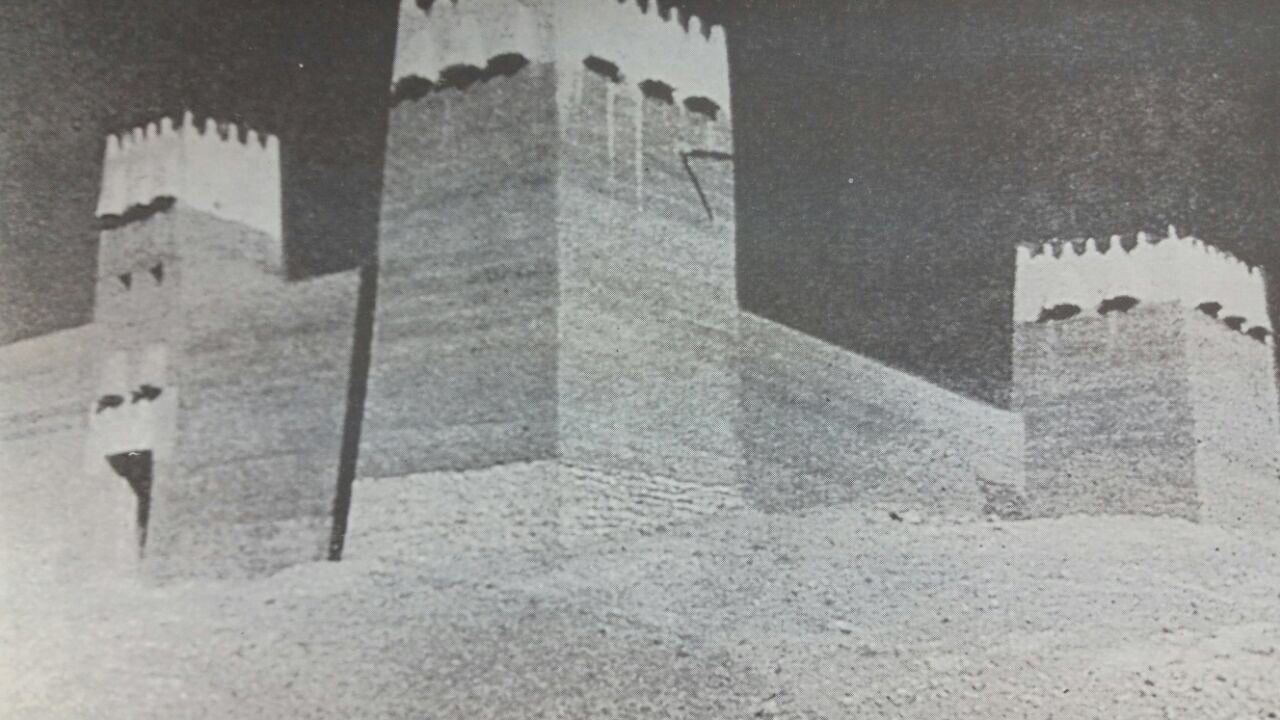
Margab Fort in Riyadh, 1939

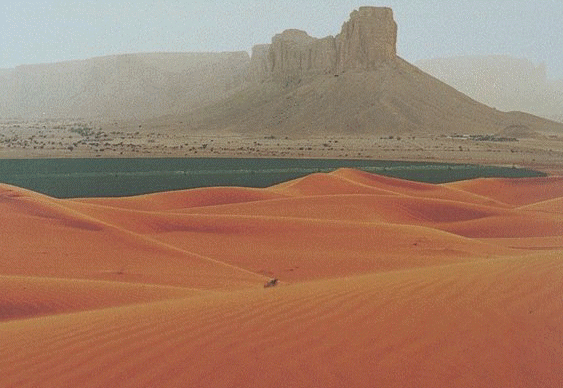
The Nafud desert on the outskirts of Riyadh with the Jabal Tuwaiq in the background

=== Urban development history ===
==== Up to 1930s ====
Historical Riyadh was enclosed by walls. At its center was a town square and a market (souq), surrounded by residential quarters of mosques and adobe homes, each with an interior courtyard. Outside its walls were orchards of date trees, hence the name 'Riyadh' or 'gardens'. During the 1930s, there was an initial outward expansion because new administrative buildings were needed for the country and because the population was growing. According to Dr. Saleh Al Hathloul, former deputy minister of town planning, this era coincided with the period of sedentarization as nomads settled in and around towns and cities such as Riyadh.

==== 1940s–1950s ====
When commercial oil production began, there was a rapid rise in the rate of urbanization and the city transitioned from traditional to newer houses and buildings. This included the railway station and the (now-defunct) first airport of Riyadh. Government departments were relocated from Jeddah to Riyadh and new ministry buildings were built. To accommodate the government employees who had moved in from Jeddah, the government developed the Malaz housing block. This block's layout was influenced by the layouts of Dammam and Khobar, which in turn were influenced by the Aramco-built Dhahran. Malaz, with its street grid and detached house type, was instrumental in shaping the master plans for Riyadh that followed, as per Dr. Saleh Al Hathloul.

==== 1960s–1970s ====
The Department of Municipal Affairs (later Ministry of Municipalities and Housing) selected Doxiadis Associates (DA) in 1968 to prepare a masterplan for Riyadh. After preliminary studies, they submitted a plan that was approved in 1972. They proposed that Riyadh will expand in the north-south axis along a commercial spine with and most importantly, that it will be divided into neighborhoods of 2 × 2 km blocks, thus solidifying the grid pattern to be the defining feature of Riyadh's layout. It also maintains the style of housing that was prominent in Malaz, detached houses with setbacks, designed in what Dr. Saleh Al Hathloul identifies as an 'international Mediterranean' style i.e. crimson colors. However, DA's shortcomings lay in their inability to accurately predict the extent of Riyadh's future growth.

At the start of the 70s, Riyadh did not go much beyond what is today the Khurais road. But nearing the 80s, Riyadh's expansion had already reached the Northern Ring Road in the north and had made considerable progress in the eastern part of the city.

In 1974, the government founded the High Commission for the Development of Arriyadh (later Royal Commission for Riyadh City) which was headed by the then governor of Riyadh Province, King Salman Bin Abdulaziz, who oversaw Riyadh's development. With the economic growth and national development plans of the 70s, the national infrastructure consisting of electricity grids, telecommunications networks, water pipelines, and highways was laid down that made further urban growth possible. The old and new industrial cities of Riyadh were both founded in this period.

==== 1980s–1990s ====
The city grew at a much faster rate than Doxiadis Associates had projected and very soon, their plan became obsolete. DA predicted that Riyadh's urban area would be 304 km^{2} in 30 years when it reached 400 km^{2} just four years after the plan was authorized. Therefore, SCET International was assigned to revise and update the original plan to reflect the drastic growth and offer adaptive measures, which were approved in 1982. While keeping the 2km x 2km block, they expanded it in all directions unlike DA's linear expansion. They also added the radial ring roads and altered the DA conception of how commercial and other zones should be distributed.

It was in the 1980s and 1990s that most of the buildings that define Riyadh's urban identity were constructed. Built in styles contemporary of that time, marble with a hint of desert beige, these included the King Khalid International Airport, King Fahd Sports City, Television tower, King Saud University new campus, the King Faisal Foundation, the Ministry of Interior, Ministry of Foreign Affairs, MOMRA, and Imam Mohammad Ibn Saud Islamic University. And the historical district was rebuilt with the National Museum, Qasr Al-Hokm District, and the Imam Turki bin Abdullah Grand Mosque. Numerous health facilities were founded as well. Other developments in this period included the opening of the first shopping centers and supermarkets.

Approaching the 2000s, Riyadh had expanded well beyond the Northern Ring Road in the north and had reached the Second Ring Road in the east.

==== 2000s–2010s ====
Digital City District

The MEDSTAR (metropolitan development strategy for Arriyadh) was the strategy that directed urban development in this era. Since the SCET plan also turned out to underestimate the rate of growth, a continuous approach instead of a one-off plan was adopted. The MEDSTAR was not a long term plan but an ongoing strategy on managing urban growth and economic development in the city. It was initiated after comprehensive studies by the Arriyadh Development Authority (the high commission's research wing) on demographics, land use, transportation, security, environment, and traffic safety. In 2007, MEDSTAR won second place in the international award for liveable communities. One of the MEDSTAR strategies was balanced development by turning Riyadh into a polycentric city rather than having one single downtown. [Riyadh: The Metamorphosis of a City From Centerless to Polycentric Fernando Perez,] This has resulted in there being multiple hubs scattered around the city such Al-Olaya, King Abdullah Financial District, Sahafa, Granada, Business Gate, Digital City, and Hittin.

Riyadh's skyline arose along the King Fahd Road starting in the 2000s. Significant construction projects like the Riyadh metro and the Princess Noura University, the world's largest women's university, were undertaken. Most malls and hypermarkets opened in this era and became a feature of city life. The municipality added wide sidewalks to a number of streets which became popular spots for walking, and parks were built in many neighborhoods. Major roads were redesigned, such as the King Fahd road, King Abdullah Road, Abu Bakr Al Siddiq road, and Oruba road, transforming the look of the city. In addition, the Royal Commission rehabilitated the Wadi Hanifa wetlands.

At the onset of the 2020s, Riyadh's expansion had gone further ahead of the King Salman Road in the north and had reached the Janadriyah road in the east.

==== 2020–present ====
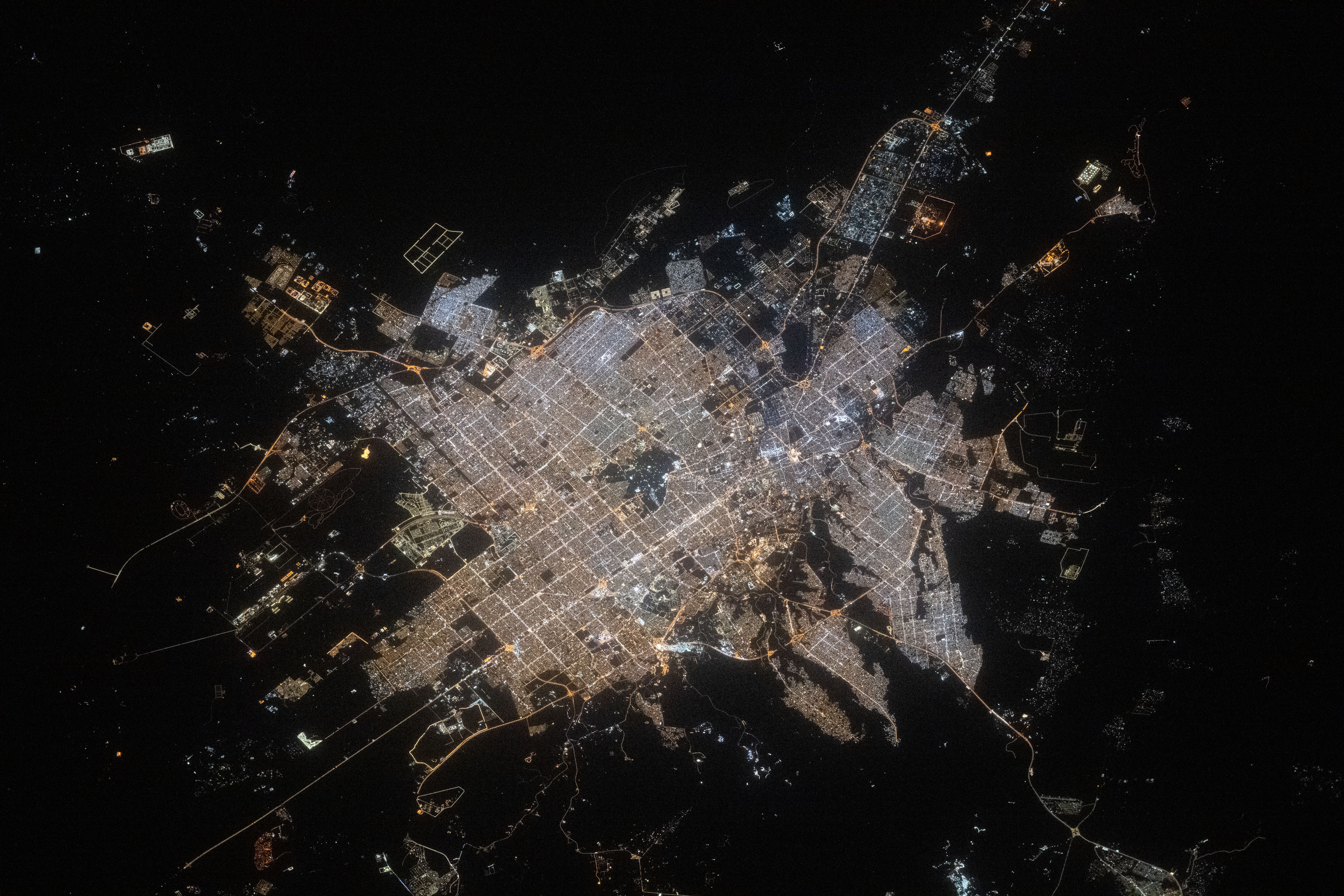
Riyadh at night (2025)

Vision 2030 has stated its objective for Saudi cities to reach the list of top 100 cities of the world in quality of life and the city is working towards this goal through new development investments. Every year, the number of tourists visiting Saudi Arabia and Riyadh increases. In the large empty area where the old airport once was, the world's largest urban park, King Salman Park, is being constructed, with leisure, residential, office, hospitality, and retail spaces. The historical city of Diriyah, now encompassed by Riyadh, has been restored and developed into a cultural and tourist destination. Many roads and streets, such as the Olaya street and the Imam Saud road, are being refurbished.

Fewer malls are opening and squares (or plazas) are taking over in popularity, the most popular having been the Riyadh Boulevard on the Prince Turki Al Awwal Road. A new downtown called 'New Murabba' at the intersection of the King Salman and King Khaled roads is planned.

New fully residential suburbs, unlike regular neighborhoods that have storefront-lined main streets, are under construction in the far north and far east of the city.

== Geography ==
=== Climate ===
Riyadh has a continental desert climate or hot desert climate (Köppen Climate Classification BWh), with long, extremely hot summers and short, cold winters due to cold continental air flowing in from Siberia during winter. The average high temperature in August is 43.6 °C (110.5 °F), and the average low temperature in January is 7.2 °C (45.0 °F). The city experiences very little precipitation, especially during the summer, but receives a fair amount of rain in March and April. It is also known to have dust storms during which the dust can be so thick that visibility is under 10 m (33 ft). On 1 and 2 April 2015, a massive dust storm hit Riyadh, causing the suspension of classes in many schools in the area and the cancellation of hundreds of flights, both domestic and international.

Climate data for Riyadh Old (1991–2020 normals)
Month	Jan	Feb	Mar	Apr	May	Jun	Jul	Aug	Sep	Oct	Nov	Dec	Year
Record high °C (°F)	33.0 (91.4)	35.0 (95.0)	38.0 (100.4)	42.0 (107.6)	46.0 (114.8)	47.5 (117.5)	48.4 (119.1)	49.8 (121.6)	46.8 (116.2)	42.5 (108.5)	38.0 (100.4)	32.7 (90.9)	49.8 (121.6)
Mean daily maximum °C (°F)	20.1 (68.2)	23.6 (74.5)	27.8 (82.0)	33.6 (92.5)	39.4 (102.9)	42.7 (108.9)	43.4 (110.1)	43.6 (110.5)	40.4 (104.7)	35.2 (95.4)	27.5 (81.5)	22.2 (72.0)	33.3 (91.9)
Daily mean °C (°F)	14.6 (58.3)	17.5 (63.5)	21.5 (70.7)	27.2 (81.0)	33.0 (91.4)	36.0 (96.8)	36.8 (98.2)	36.9 (98.4)	33.7 (92.7)	28.5 (83.3)	21.4 (70.5)	16.4 (61.5)	26.9 (80.4)
Mean daily minimum °C (°F)	9.2 (48.6)	11.5 (52.7)	15.2 (59.4)	20.7 (69.3)	26.1 (79.0)	28.4 (83.1)	29.4 (84.9)	29.5 (85.1)	26.2 (79.2)	21.3 (70.3)	15.5 (59.9)	10.8 (51.4)	20.3 (68.5)
Record low °C (°F)	−5.4 (22.3)	0.5 (32.9)	4.5 (40.1)	11.0 (51.8)	13.0 (55.4)	16.0 (60.8)	19.0 (66.2)	18.5 (65.3)	15.0 (59.0)	8.5 (47.3)	0.5 (32.9)	−2.2 (28.0)	−5.4 (22.3)
Average precipitation mm (inches)	15.4 (0.61)	6.1 (0.24)	21.1 (0.83)	24.3 (0.96)	5.4 (0.21)	0.0 (0.0)	0.0 (0.0)	0.5 (0.02)	0.0 (0.0)	1.0 (0.04)	11.4 (0.45)	14.7 (0.58)	99.9 (3.93)
Average precipitation days (≥ 1 mm)	2.1	1.0	2.7	3.4	0.8	0.0	0.0	0.1	0.0	0.3	1.7	1.9	13.9
Average relative humidity (%)	47	36	32	28	17	11	10	12	14	20	36	45	26
Average dew point °C (°F)	2 (36)	1 (34)	2 (36)	4 (39)	3 (37)	−1 (30)	0 (32)	2 (36)	2 (36)	2 (36)	4 (39)	3 (37)	2 (36)
Mean monthly sunshine hours	252.1	233.5	252.1	259.4	312.7	355.1	354.2	347.8	324.2	309.5	262.5	244.2	3,507.3
Percentage possible sunshine	75	74	68	68	76	87	85	87	88	87	80	74	79
Average ultraviolet index	3	7	9	11	12	13	13	12	11	8	6	3	9
Source 1: NOAA,
Source 2: Time and Date (dewpoints, 1985-2015)

Climate data for Riyadh New (1991–2020 normals)
Month	Jan	Feb	Mar	Apr	May	Jun	Jul	Aug	Sep	Oct	Nov	Dec	Year
Record high °C (°F)	33.0 (91.4)	34.5 (94.1)	38.3 (100.9)	42.0 (107.6)	46.0 (114.8)	47.5 (117.5)	48.4 (119.1)	48.8 (119.8)	46.8 (116.2)	42.5 (108.5)	37.0 (98.6)	32.7 (90.9)	48.8 (119.8)
Mean daily maximum °C (°F)	20.7 (69.3)	23.7 (74.7)	28.0 (82.4)	33.6 (92.5)	39.5 (103.1)	42.8 (109.0)	43.9 (111.0)	43.8 (110.8)	40.9 (105.6)	35.5 (95.9)	27.4 (81.3)	22.3 (72.1)	33.5 (92.3)
Daily mean °C (°F)	10.4 (50.7)	16.7 (62.1)	21.0 (69.8)	26.4 (79.5)	32.2 (90.0)	35.2 (95.4)	36.3 (97.3)	36.0 (96.8)	32.8 (91.0)	27.5 (81.5)	20.4 (68.7)	15.4 (59.7)	26.2 (79.2)
Mean daily minimum °C (°F)	5 (41)	9.9 (49.8)	13.8 (56.8)	19.1 (66.4)	24.1 (75.4)	26.1 (79.0)	27.3 (81.1)	27.0 (80.6)	23.7 (74.7)	18.9 (66.0)	13.6 (56.5)	9.1 (48.4)	18.3 (64.9)
Record low °C (°F)	−5.4 (22.3)	−3.3 (26.1)	2.1 (35.8)	8.9 (48.0)	14.0 (57.2)	19.8 (67.6)	20.0 (68.0)	20.0 (68.0)	14.4 (57.9)	8.9 (48.0)	4.5 (40.1)	−2.0 (28.4)	−5.4 (22.3)
Average precipitation mm (inches)	14.8 (0.58)	8.3 (0.33)	19.9 (0.78)	23.7 (0.93)	5.7 (0.22)	0.0 (0.0)	0.0 (0.0)	0.0 (0.0)	0.0 (0.0)	1.5 (0.06)	20.1 (0.79)	13.5 (0.53)	107.6 (4.24)
Average precipitation days (≥ 1 mm)	1.7	1.5	2.6	3.7	0.9	0.0	0.0	0.0	0.0	0.4	2.5	1.7	14.9
Source 1: NOAA
Source 2: Pogodaiklimat.ru (extremes)

=== City districts ===
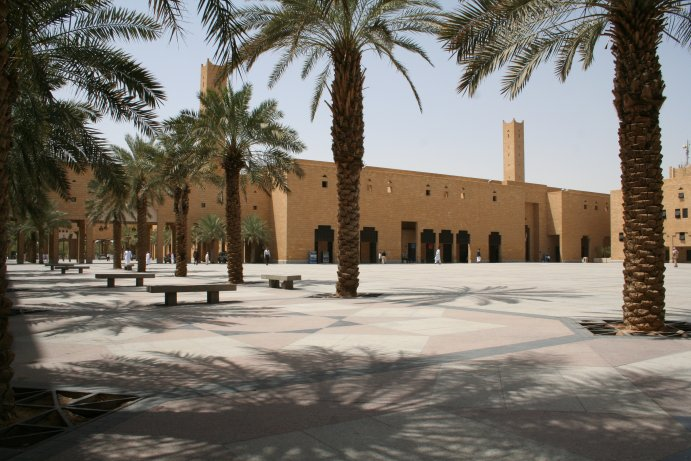
Imam Turki bin Abdullah Grand Mosque

Riyadh is divided into fourteen branch municipalities, in addition to the Diplomatic Quarter. Each branch municipality in turn contains several districts, amounting to over 130 in total, though some districts are divided between more than one branch municipality. The branch municipalities are Al-Shemaysi, Irqah, Al-Ma'athar, Al-Olaya, Al-Aziziyya, Al-Malaz, Al-Selayy, Nemar, Al-Neseem, Al-Shifa, Al-'Urayja, Al-Bat'ha, Al-Ha'ir, Al-Rawdha, and Al-Shamal ("the North"). Al-Olaya District is the commercial heart of the city, with accommodation, entertainment, dining and shopping options. The Kingdom Centre, Al-Faisaliah, and Al-Tahlya Street are the area's most prominent landmarks. The center of the city, Al-Bateha and Al-Deerah, is also its oldest part. Some of the main districts of Riyadh are:

- Al-Bat'ha
  - Al-Deerah (old Riyadh)
  - Mi'kal
  - Manfuhah
  - Manfuha Al-Jadidah (منفوحة الجديدة – "new Manfuha")
  - Al-'Oud
  - Al-Mansorah
  - Al-Margab
  - Salam
  - Jabrah
  - Al-Yamamah
  - 'Otayyigah
- Al-Olaya & Sulaymaniyyah
  - Al-Olaya
  - Al-Sulaymaniyyah
  - Al Izdihar
  - King Fahd District
  - Al-Masif
  - Al-Murooj
  - Al-Mugharrazat
  - Al-Wurood
- Nemar
  - Nemar
  - Dharat Nemar
  - Tuwaiq
  - Hazm
  - Deerab
- Irqah
  - Irqah
  - Al-Khozama
- Diplomatic Quarter
- Al-Shumaisi
  - Al-Shumaisi
  - Eleyshah
  - Al-Badi'ah
  - Syah
  - Al-Nasriyyah
  - Umm Sulaim
  - Al-Ma'athar
  - Umm Al-Hamam (East)
- Al-Ma'dhar
  - Al-Olayya
  - Al-Nakheel
  - King Saud University main campus
  - Umm Al-Hamam (East)
  - Umm Al-Hamam (West)
  - Al-Ma'athar Al-Shimali ("North Ma'athar")
  - Al-Rahmaniyya
  - Al-Muhammadiyya
  - Al-Ra'id
- Al-Hayir
  - Al-Hayir
  - Al-Ghannamiyyah
  - Uraydh
- Al-'Aziziyyah
  - Al Aziziyah (Riyadh)
  - Ad Dar Al Baida
  - Taybah
  - Al-Mansurah
- Al-Malaz
  - Al-Malaz
  - Al-Rabwah
  - Al-Rayyan
  - Jarir
  - Al-Murabba'
  - Sinaiyah al-Qadimah
- Al-Shifa
  - Al-Masani'
  - Al-Shifa
  - Al-Mansuriyya
  - Al-Marwah
- Al-Urayja
  - Al-Urayja
  - Al-Urayja Al-Wusta ("Mid-Urayja")
  - Al-Urayja (West)
  - Shubra
  - Dharat Laban
  - Hijrat Laban
  - Al-Suwaidi
  - Al-Suwaidi (West)
  - Dahrat Al-Badi'ah
  - Sultanah
- Al-Shamal
  - Al-Malga
  - Al-Sahafa
  - Hittin
  - Al-Wadi
  - Al-Ghadir
  - Al-Nafil
  - Imam Mohammad Ibn Saud Islamic University main campus
  - Al-Qayrawan
  - Al-Aqiq
  - Al-Arid
- Al-Naseem
  - Al-Naseem (East)
  - Al-Naseem (West)
  - As-Salam
  - Al-Manar
  - Al-Rimayah
  - Al-Nadheem
- Al-Rawdhah
  - Al-Rawdhah
  - Al-Qadisiyah
  - Al-M'aizliyyah
  - Al-Nahdhah
  - Gharnatah (Granada)
  - Qortubah (Cordoba)
  - Al-Andalus (Andalusia)
  - Al-Hamra
  - Al-Qouds
- Al-Sulay
  - Al-Sulay
  - Ad Difa'
  - Al Iskan
  - Khashm Al-'Aan
  - Al-Sa'adah
  - Al-Fayha
  - Al-Manakh
- King Abdullah Financial District
- Diriyah (suburb of Riyadh)

== Demographics ==
Riyadh population pyramid in 2010

Historical population

Year	Pop.	±% p.a.
1918	18,000	—
1924	30,000	+8.89%
1944	50,000	+2.59%
1952	80,000	+6.05%
1960	150,000	+8.17%
1972	500,000	+10.55%
1978	760,000	+7.23%
1987	1,389,000	+6.93%

Year	Pop.	±% p.a.
1992	3,834,986	+22.52%
1997	3,100,000	−4.17%
2004	4,138,329	+4.21%
2009	4,873,723	+3.33%
2010	6,792,776	+39.38%
2013	5,899,528	−4.59%
2016	6,506,700	+3.32%
2022	7,009,100	+1.25%

Source: Census data,

In 2022, the city had over 7 million people. The city had a population of 40,000 inhabitants in 1935 and 83,000 in 1949. The city has experienced very high rates of population growth, from 150,000 inhabitants in the 1960s to over seven million, according to the most recent sources. As of 2017, the population of Riyadh is composed of 64.19% Saudis, while non-Saudis account for 35.81% of the population. Indians are the largest minority population at 13.7%, followed by Pakistanis at 12.4%. The population is so high due to the doubled birth rates and the high economic growth. There was also an influx of immigrants.

The literacy rate in 2020 was 99.36% and in 2021 it was 99.38%. The literacy rate in Saudi Arabia has improved from 2010 when it was 98.10%.

== Landmarks and architecture ==
=== Vernacular architecture of Old Riyadh ===
The old town of Riyadh within the city walls did not exceed an area of 1 km^{2}, and therefore very few significant architectural remnants of the original walled oasis town of Riyadh exist today. The most prominent is the Al-Masmak Palace and some parts of the original wall structure with its gate which have been restored and reconstructed. There are also a number of traditional mud-brick houses within these old limits, but they are for the most part dilapidated.

Expansion outside the city walls was slow to begin with, although there were some smaller oases and settlements surrounding Riyadh. The first major construction beyond the walls was King Abdulaziz's Murabba Palace. It was constructed in 1936, completed in 1938, and a household of 800 people moved into it in 1938. The palace is now part of a bigger complex called King Abdulaziz Historical Center.

There are other traditional villages and towns in the area around traditional Riyadh which the urban sprawl reached and encompasses. These include Diriyah, Manfuha and Wadi Laban. Unlike in the early days of development in Riyadh during which vernacular structures were razed to the ground without consideration, there is a new-found appreciation for traditional architecture. The Ministry of Tourism is making efforts to revitalize the historic architecture in Riyadh and other parts of the kingdom.

Ain Heet Cave

Ain Heet cave has an underground lake (150 meters deep) situated at the face of Mount Al Jubayl in Wadi As Sulay in a small village called Heet in Riyadh. Between Riyadh and Al Kharj road, it is one of the easily accessible caves in the area of Riyadh.

=== Archeological sites ===
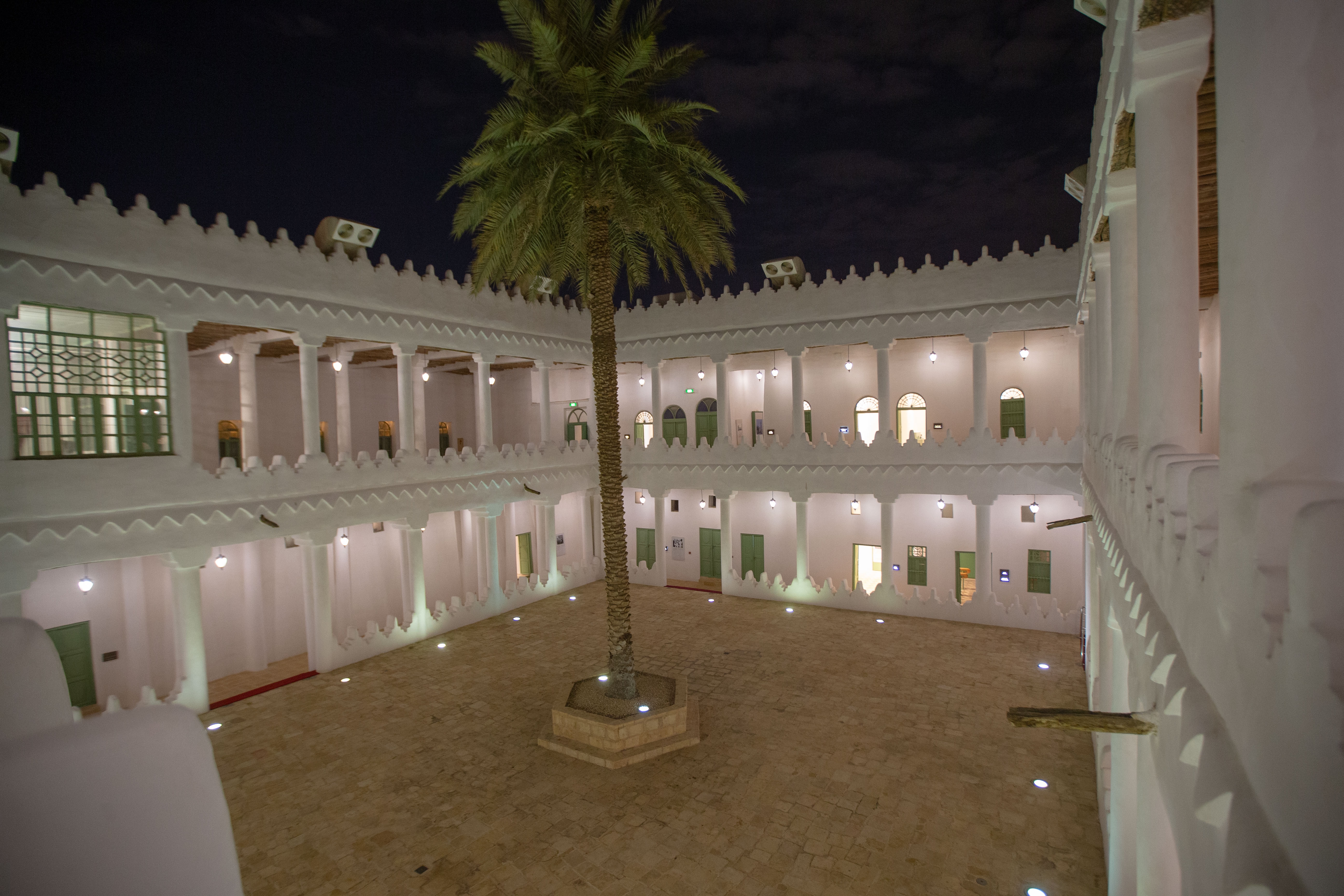
A courtyard in the Murabba Palace

The archeological sites at Riyadh which are of historical importance, in which the Municipality of Riyadh is involved, are the five old gates on the old walls of Riyadh. These are the eastern gate of Thumaira, the northern gate of Al-Suwailen, the southern gate of Dukhna, the western gate of Al-Madhbah, and the south-western gate of Shumaisi. There are also four historic palaces: Al-Masmak Palace, Murabba Palace (palace of King Abdulaziz), Atiqah Palace (belongs to Prince Muhammad bin Abdul Rahman) and Al-Shamsiah Palace (belongs to Saud Al-Kabeer).

==== Turaif district ====
The Turaif district, another important archeological site, was inscribed in the UNESCO World Heritage List on 31 July 2010. It was founded in the 15th century bearing an architectural style of Najdi. There are some Historic palaces and monuments in Al-Turaif district include: Salwa Palace, Saad bin Saud Palace, The Guest House and At-Turaif Bath House, and Imam Mohammad bin Saud Mosque.

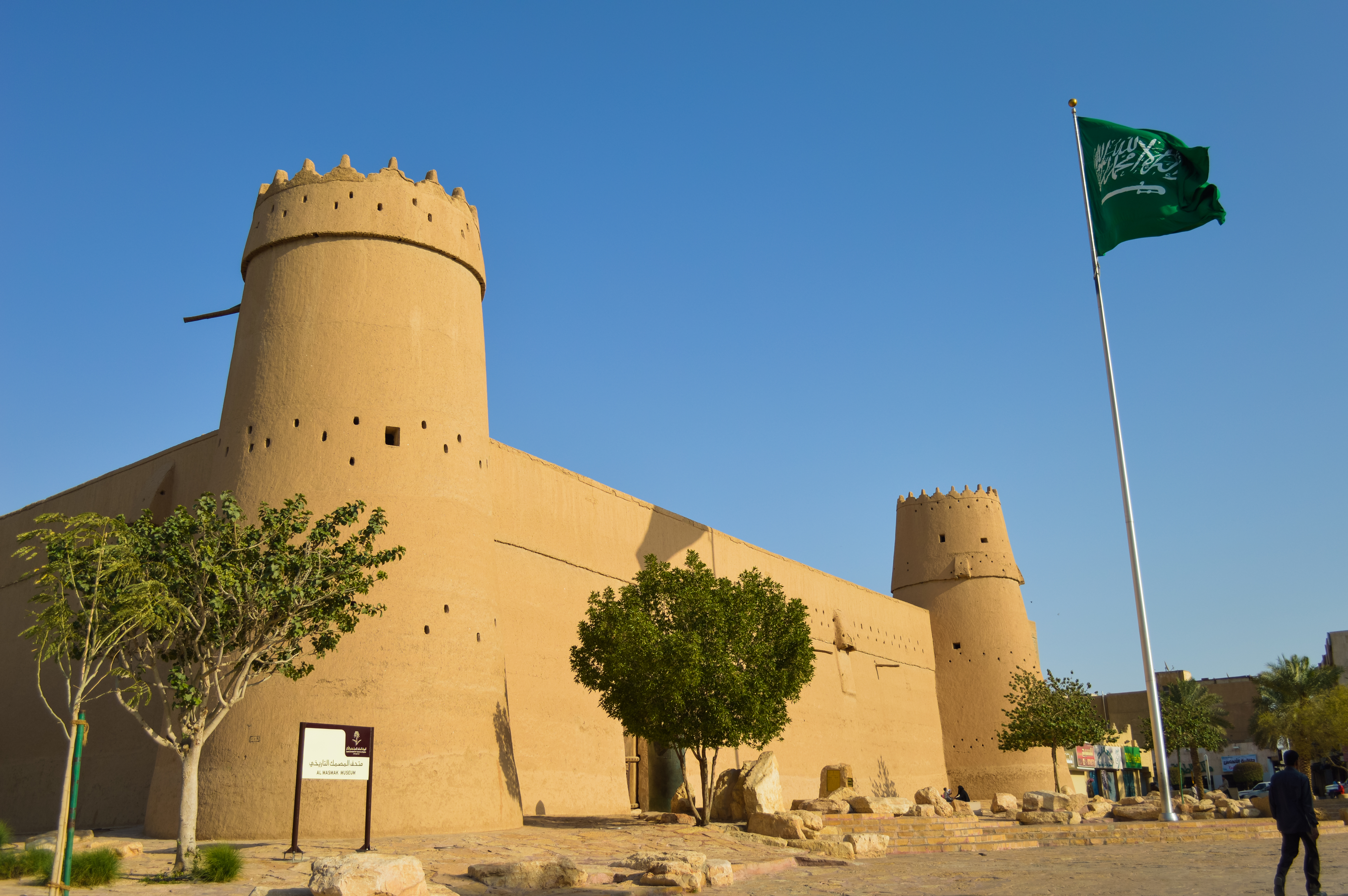
Al-Musmak Palace in 2014

==== Al-Masmak Palace ====
This fortress was built around 1865 under the rule of the House of Rashid, the rulers of Ha'il to the north, who had wrested control of the city from the rival house, House of Saud. In January 1902 Ibn Saud, who was at the time living in exile in Kuwait, succeeded in capturing the Musmak Palace from its Rashid garrison. The event, which restored Saudi control over Riyadh, has acquired an almost mythical status in the history of Saudi Arabia. The story of the event is often retold and has as its central theme the heroism and bravery of King Ibn Saud. The Musmak Palace is now a museum and is in close proximity to the Deera Square.

=== Contemporary architecture ===
==== Kingdom Centre ====
Designed by the team of Ellerbe Becket and Omrania, the tower is built on 94,230 square meters of land. The Kingdom Centre is owned by a group of companies including Kingdom Holding Company, headed by Al-Waleed bin Talal, a prince of the Saudi royal family, and is the headquarters of the holding company. The project cost 2 billion Saudi Arabian Riyals and the contract was undertaken by El-Seif. The Kingdom Centre is the winner of the 2002 Emporis Skyscraper Award, selected as the "best new skyscraper of the year for design and functionality". A three-level shopping center, which also won a major design award, fills the east wing. The large opening is illuminated at night in continuously changing colors. The shopping center has a separate floor for women only to shop where men are not allowed to enter.

The Kingdom Centre has 99 stories and is the fifth tallest structure in the country, rising to 300m. A special aspect of the tower is that it is divided into two parts in the last one-third of its height and is linked by a sky-bridge walkway, which provides extensive views of Riyadh.

==== Burj Rafal ====
Burj Rafal, located on King Fahd Road, is the second tallest skyscraper in Riyadh at 307.9 meters (1,010 feet) tall. The tower was designed and engineered by P & T Group. Construction began in 2010 and was completed in 2014. The project was considered a success, with 70% of the residential units already sold by the time the skyscraper was topped out. The tower contained 474 residential condominium units and a 349-room 5-star Kempinski hotel. Since then the hotel has been operated under the JW Mariott brand.

==== Al-Faisaliah Tower ====
Al Faisaliah Tower (Arabic: برج الفيصلية) is the first skyscraper constructed in Saudi Arabia and is the third tallest building in Riyadh after Burj Rafal and the Kingdom Centre. The golden ball that lies atop the tower is said to be inspired by a ballpoint pen, and contains a restaurant; immediately below this is an outside viewing deck. There is a shopping center with major world brands at ground level. Al-Faisaliah Tower also has a hotel on both sides of the tower while the main building is occupied by office. The Al-Faisaliah Tower has 44 stories. It was designed by Foster and Partners.

==== Riyadh TV Tower ====
The Riyadh TV Tower is a 170-meter-high television tower located inside the premises of the Saudi Ministry of Information. It is a vertical cantilever structure which was built between 1978 and 1981. The first movie made in 1983 by the TV tower group and named "1,000 Nights and Night" had Mohammed Abdu and Talal Mmdah as the main characters. At that time, there were no women on TV because of religious restrictions. Three years later, Abdul Khaliq Al-Ghanim produced a TV series called "Tash Ma Tash," which earned a good reaction from audiences in Eastern Arabia. This series created a media revolution back in the 1980s.

=== Museums and collections ===
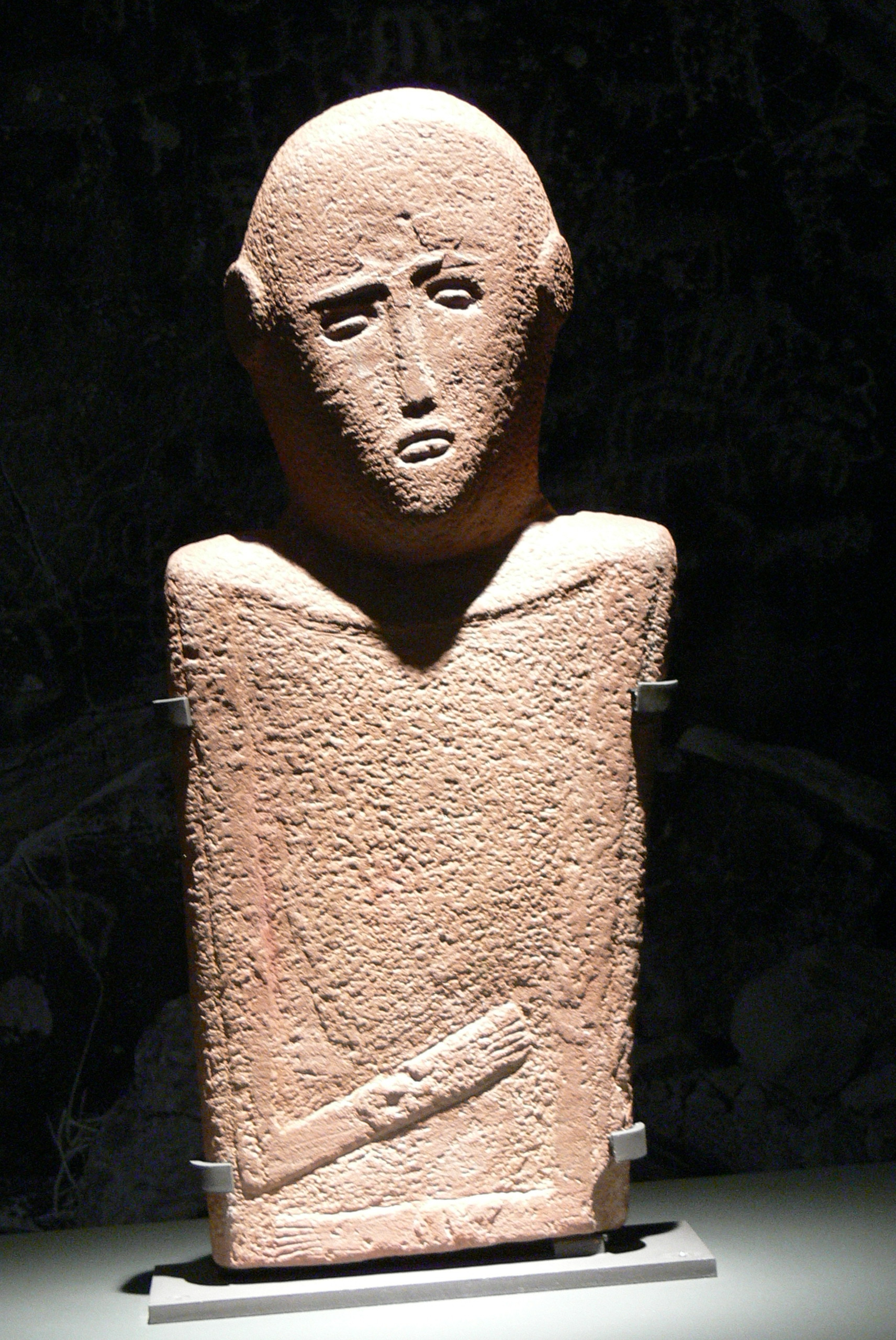
Anthropomorphic stela from the 4th millennium BC at the National Museum of Saudi Arabia, Riyadh

In 1999, a new central museum was built in Riyadh, at the eastern side of the King Abdulaziz Historical Center. The National Museum of Saudi Arabia combined several collections and pieces that had up until then been scattered over several institutions and other places in Riyadh and the Kingdom. For example, the meteorite fragment is known as the "Camel's Hump", recovered in 1966 from the Wabar site, that was on display at the King Saud University in Riyadh became the new entry piece of the National Museum of Saudi Arabia.

The Royal Saudi Air Force Museum, or Saqr Al-Jazira, is located on the East Ring Road of Riyadh between exits 10 and 11. It contains a collection of aircraft and aviation-related items used by the Royal Saudi Air Force and Saudia Airlines.

== Sports ==
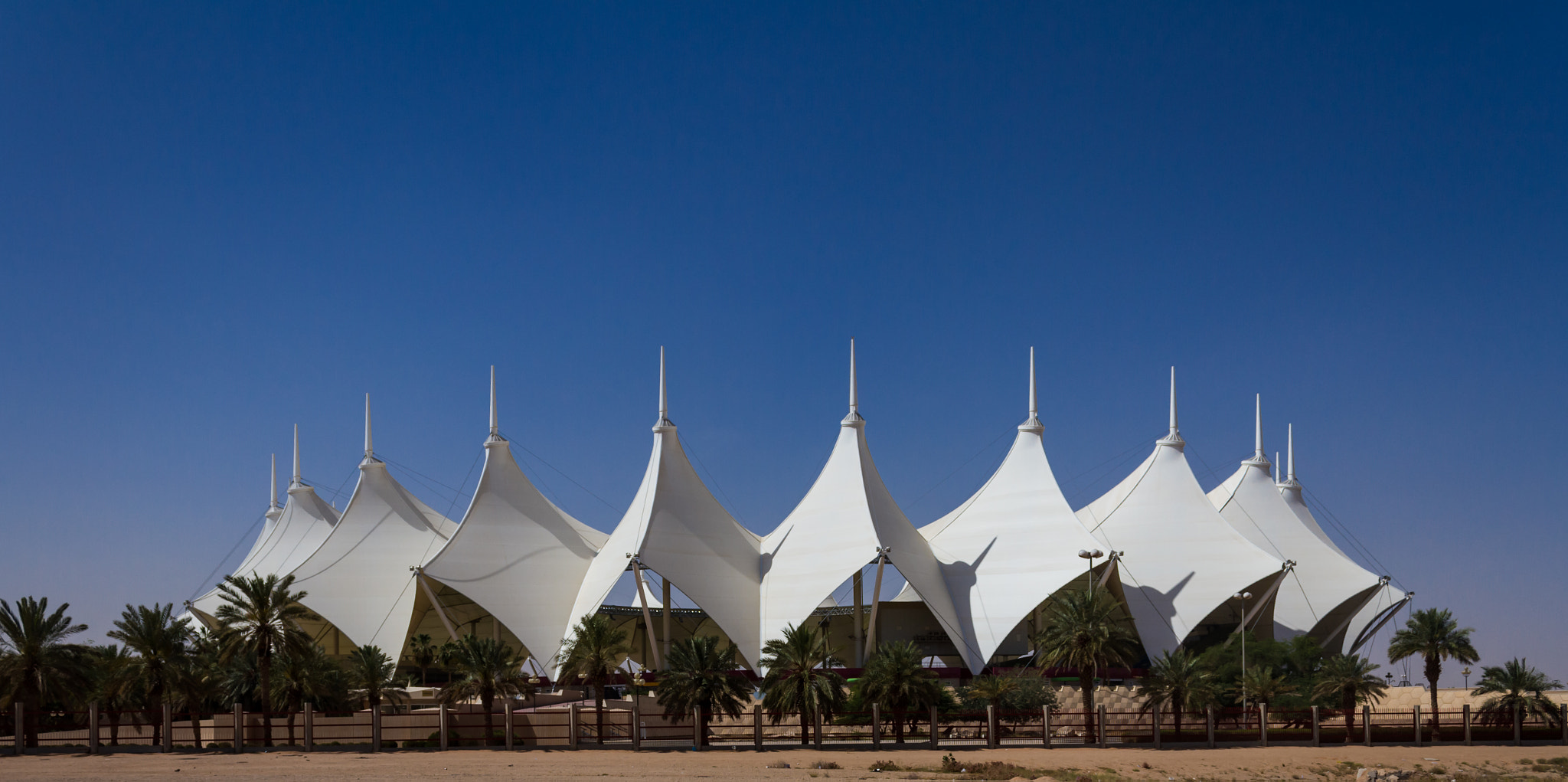
King Fahd Sports City

Football is the most popular sport in Saudi Arabia. The city hosts four major football clubs, Al-Hilal was established in 1957 and has won 19 championships in the Saudi Pro League. Al-Nassr club is another team in the top league that has many supporters around the kingdom. It was established in 1955, and has been named champion of the Saudi professional League 9 times. Another well-known club, Al-Shabab, was established in 1947 and holds 6 championships. There is also Al-Riyadh Club, which was established in 1954, as well as many other minor clubs.

The city also has several large stadiums such as King Fahd Sports City Stadium with a seating capacity of 70,200. The stadium hosted the FIFA Confederations Cup three times, in the years 1992, 1995 and 1997. It also hosted the FIFA U-20 World Cup in 1989, and Prince Faisal bin Fahd Sports City Stadium that is used mostly for Football matches. The stadium has a capacity of 22,500 people.

The city's GPYW Indoor Stadium served as host arena for the 1997 ABC Championship, where Saudi Arabia men's national basketball team reached the Final Four.

On 29 February 2020, the world's richest thoroughbred horse race took place at the King Abdulaziz Racetrack in Riyadh. The Saudi Cup is a new race for thoroughbreds aged four and up, to be run at weight-for-age terms over 1800m (9f). The prize money is US$20m with a prize of US$10m to the winner and prize money down to tenth place. The Saudi Cup is perfectly positioned between the Pegasus World Cup and the Dubai World Cup to attract the best horses from around the world to compete for horse racing's richest prize. Putting the Kingdom of Saudi Arabia on the international horseracing map, the Saudi Cup will also hold an undercard of international races on both dirt and the new turf course.

On 26 April 2020, Saudi Arabia entered the bidding process for the 2030 Asian Games; their main rival for this event was Doha, Qatar. On 16 December 2020, it was announced that Riyadh will host the 2034 Asian Games.

Esports in Riyadh began with the city's first major tournament, the GSA E-Sports Cup, in 2018. The Saudi Esports Federation further boosted this growth by organizing the Gamers8 festival in 2022 and 2023. The 2023 edition of the festival offered the largest prize pool in the history of global competitive esports at the time, totaling $45 million. As part of the Gamers8 festival, the Riyadh Masters, a Dota 2 tournament, boasted a significant prize pool of $15 million, surpassed only by the Fortnite World Cup Finals and The International in the history of esports tournaments. Gamers8 would be replaced by the Esports World Cup in 2024, which boasts a total prize pool of over $60 million, which will be the largest prize pool in the history of global competitive esports, split among at least 20 different tournaments and a Club Championship for esports organizations.

== Transportation ==
=== Air ===
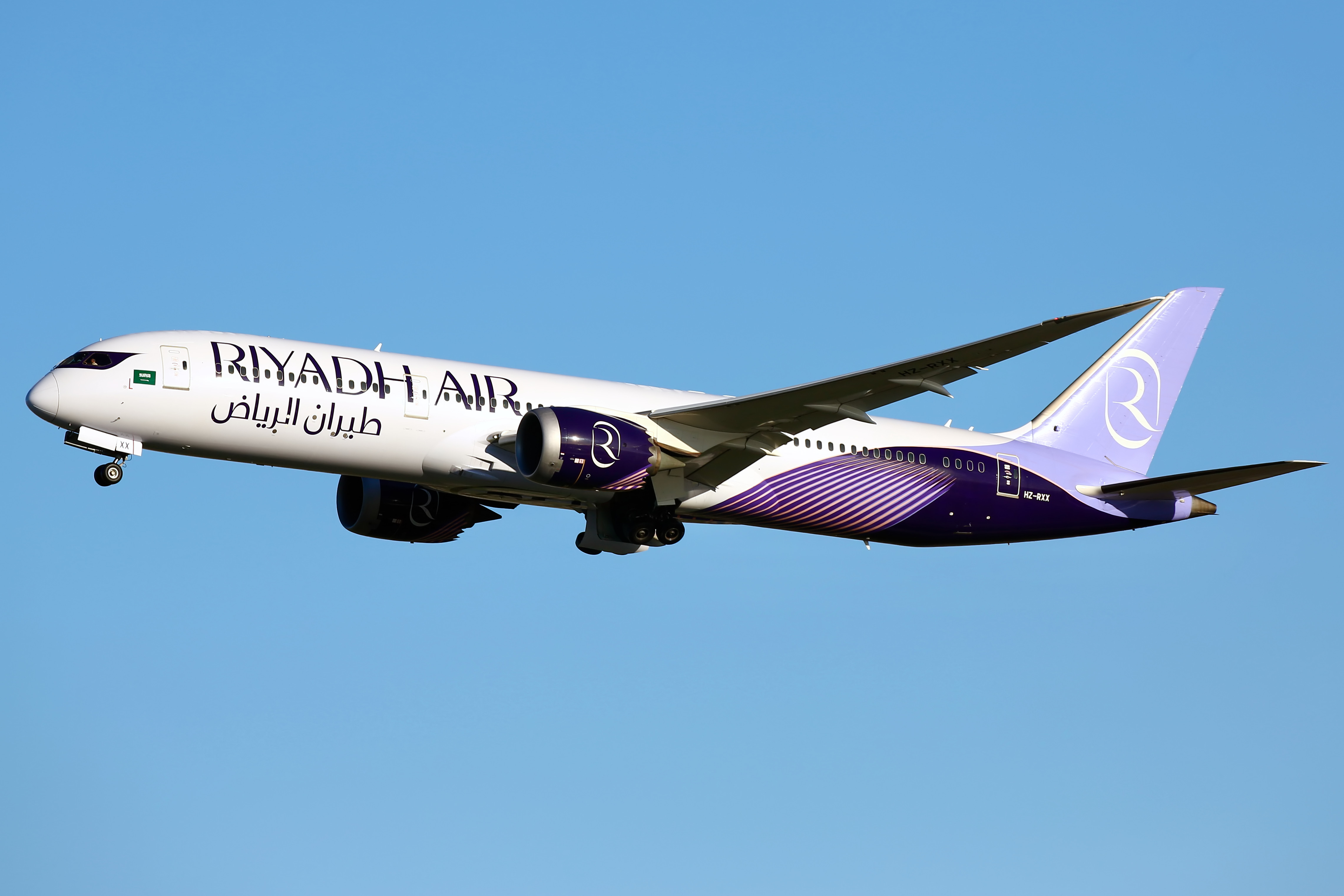
A Riyadh Air Boeing 787 Dreamliner

Riyadh's King Khalid International Airport (KKIA) is located 35 kilometers north of the city center. It is the city's main airport, and served over 20 million passengers in 2013. The airport is the main hub of the new flag carrier Riyadh Air. The airport will be expanded, with six parallel runways and three or four large passenger terminals by 2030. It will be able to serve 120 million passengers per year after 2030, and 185 million passengers per year by 2050.

=== Buses ===
As part of King Abdulaziz's Public Transport Project, Riyadh Bus network consists of 3 main bus lines, covering a distance of 1,905 km. Riyadh’s bus network consists of 87 routes across the city using 842 vehicles with approximately 3,000 service stations. The bus network transported 50 million passengers in 2024.

The main charter bus company in the kingdom, known as the Saudi Public Transport Company (SAPTCO), offers trips both within the kingdom and to its neighboring countries, including Egypt (via ferries from Safaga or Nuweiba) and Arab states of the Gulf Cooperation Council.

=== Metro ===
Riyadh Metro network map

The Riyadh Metro, part of the King Abdulaziz Public Transport Project, is the world's longest driverless metro system.

=== Railways ===
Saudi Arabia Railways operates two separate passenger and cargo lines between Riyadh and Dammam, passing through Hofuf and Haradh. Two future railway projects, connecting Riyadh with Jeddah and Mecca in the western region, and connecting Riyadh with Buraidah, Ha'il and Northern Saudi Arabia are underway.

=== Roads ===
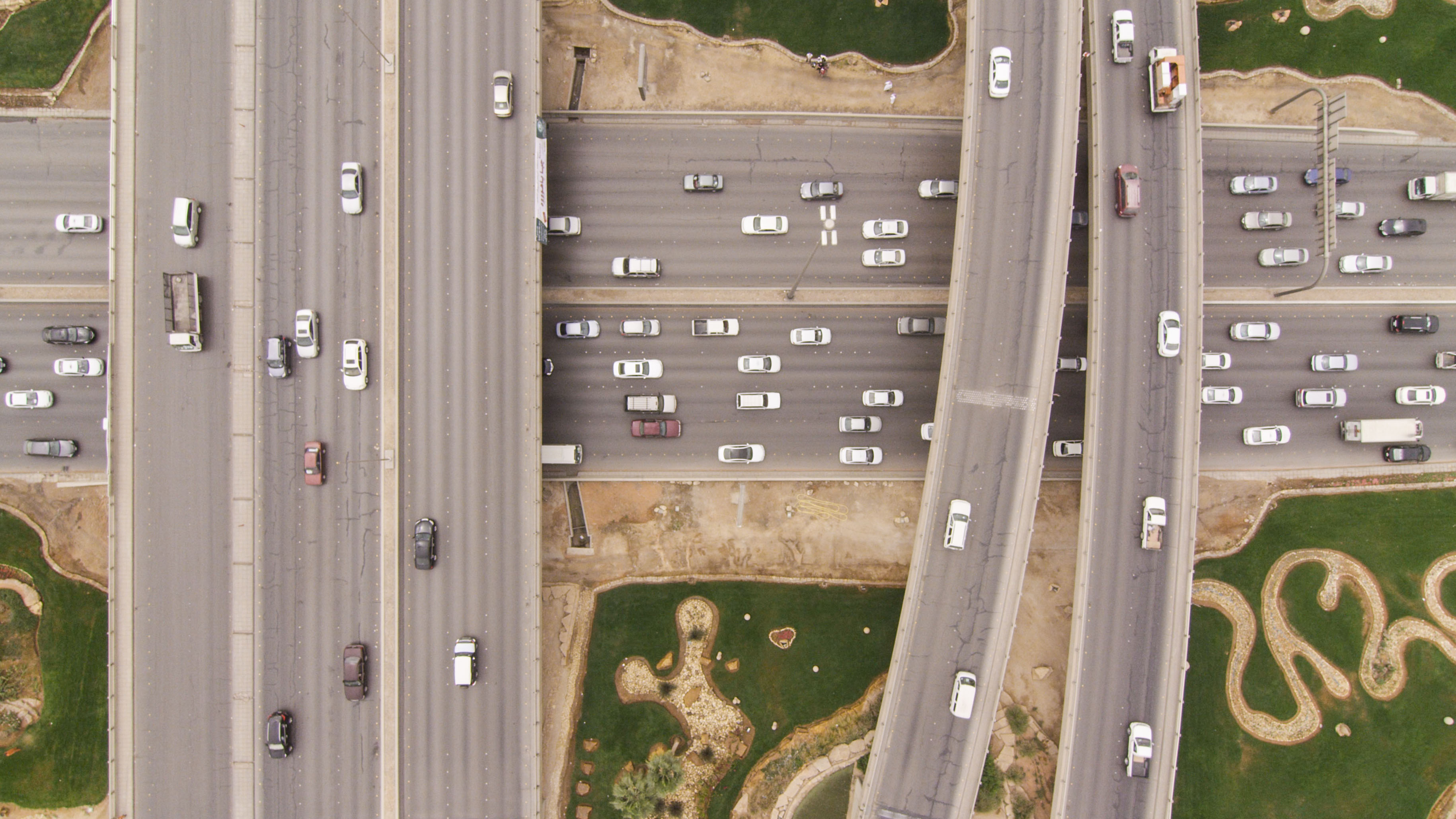
Highways intersecting in Riyadh

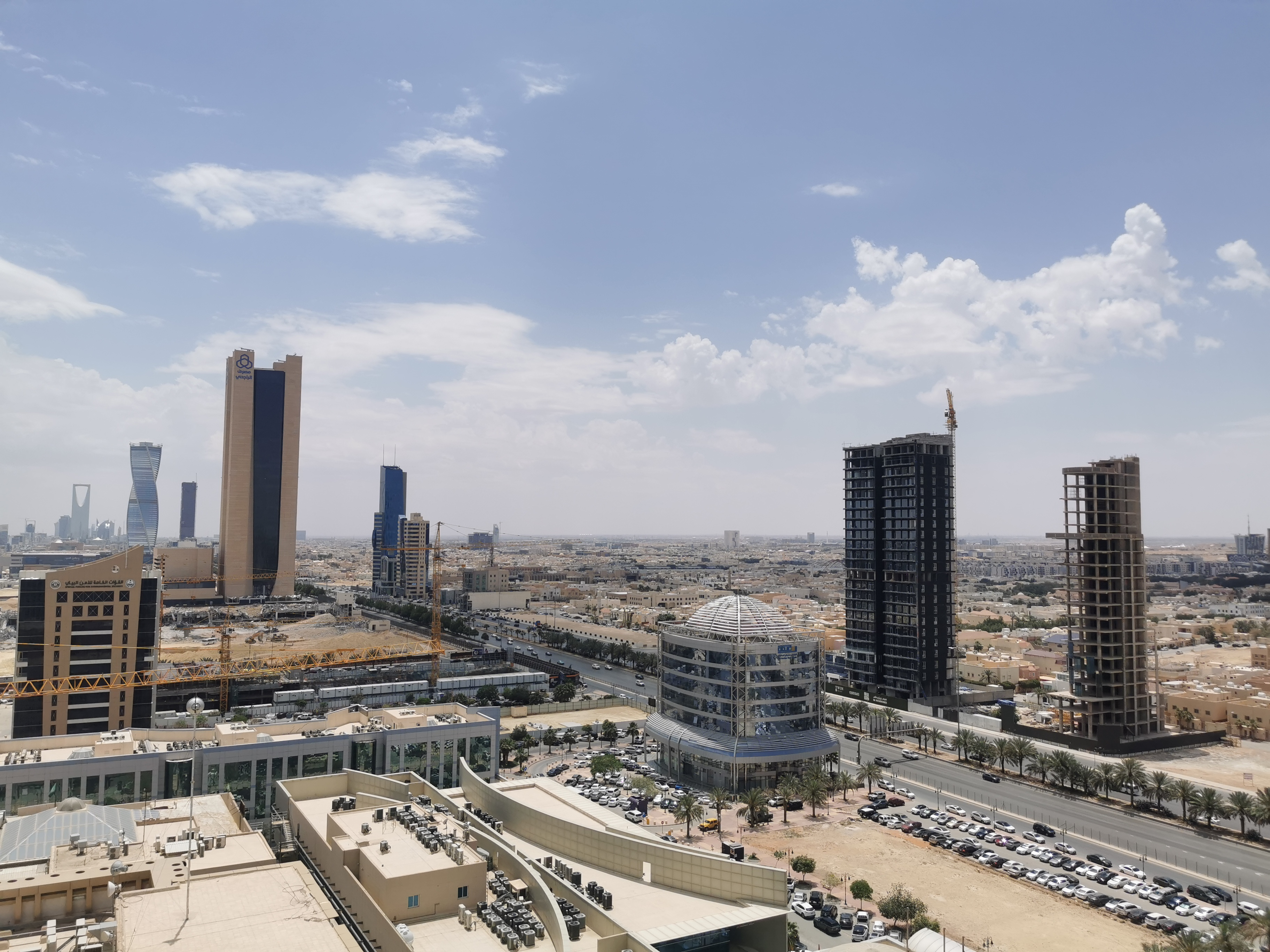
King Fahd Road is one of the main transport axes in Riyadh and a key link between south and north of the city

The city is served by a major highway system. The main Eastern Ring Road connects the city's south and north, while the Northern Ring Road connects the city's east and west. King Fahd Road runs through the center of the city from north to south, in parallel with the East Ring Road. Makkah Road, which runs east–west across the city's center, connects eastern parts of the city with the city's main business district and the diplomatic quarters.

- Highway 65 runs north-south along Ha'il, Buraidah, through Riyadh, to Al-Kharj.
- Highway 40 runs east-west from Jeddah to Dammam through Riyadh.

== Media ==
The 170 m (560 ft) Riyadh TV Tower, operated by the Ministry of Information, was built between 1978 and 1981. National Saudi television channels Saudi TV1, Saudi TV2, Al-Riyadiya, Al-Ekhbariya, Arab Radio and Television Network operate from here. Television broadcasts are mainly in Arabic, although some radio broadcasts are in English or French. Arabic is the main language used in television and radio but radio broadcasts are also made in different languages such as Urdu, French, or English. Riyadh has four Arabic newspapers; Asharq Al-Awsat (which is owned by the city governor), Al-Riyadh, Al-Jazirah and Al-Watan, two English language newspapers; Saudi Gazette and Arab News, and one Malayalam language newspaper, Gulf Madhyamam. The Saudi government monitors and filters internet content. Political dissent is not tolerated in Saudi Arabia. Saudi Arabia has had strict regulations on cinema and the arts.

== Development projects ==
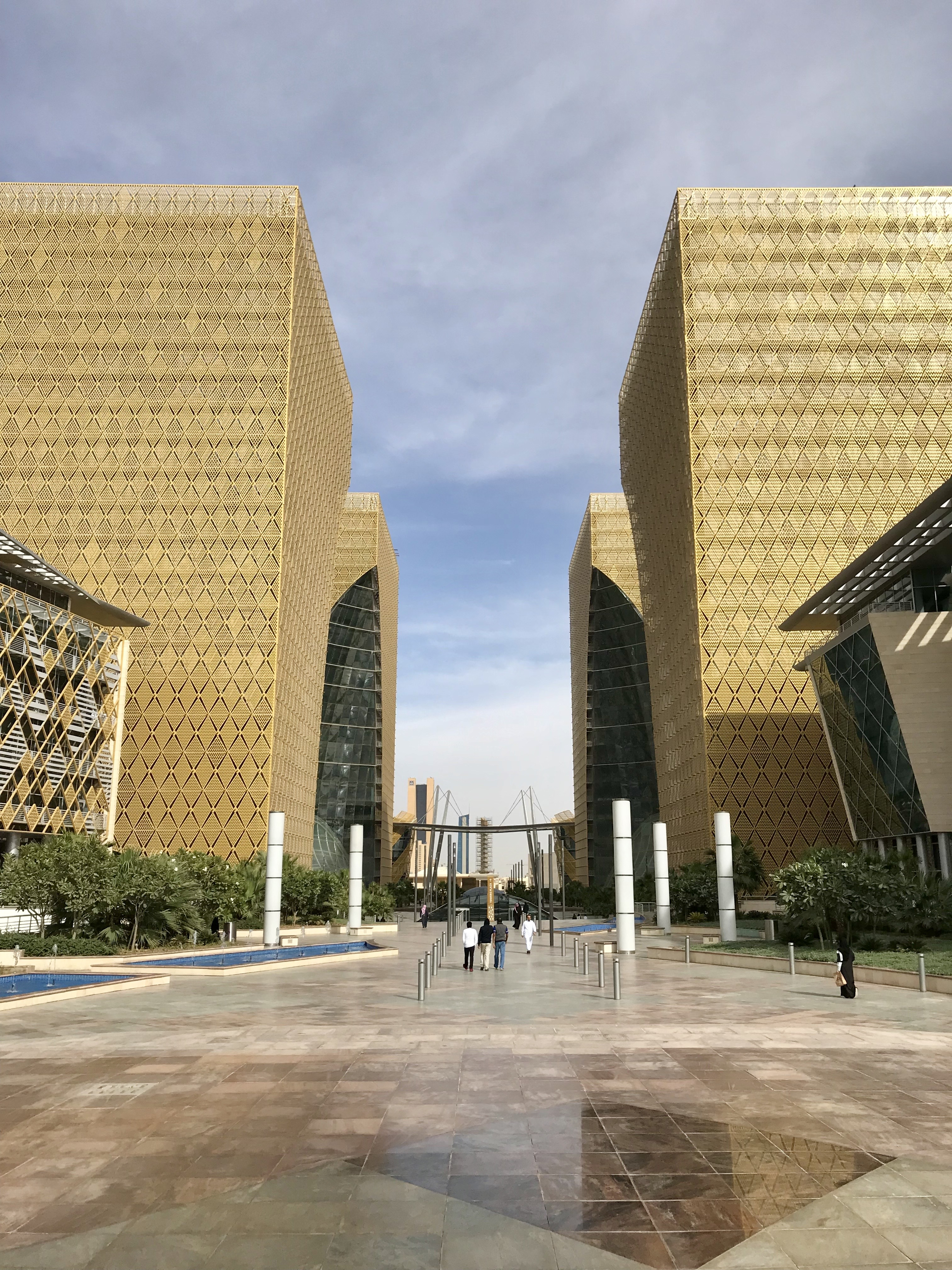
Digital City District

In 2019, King Salman launched a plan to implement 1281 development projects in Riyadh. The project is planned to cost around US$22 billion. The main goal of the plan is to improve the infrastructure, transportation, environment and other facilities in Riyadh and the surrounding area. In the framework of Saudi Vision 2030, the plan will take care of constructing 15 housing projects, building a huge museum, establishing an environmental project, sports areas, medical cities, educational facilities, etc. This includes the establishment of 14 electricity projects, 20 sewage projects, 10 housing areas, 66 trading and industrial areas, a number of lakes covering 315,000 square meters, and advanced sports cities. Since the announcement of the Vision, Riyadh has implemented various reforms to lay the foundation for the next steps of the Vision. Vision 2030's stated goals are to promote tourism, and to help push Saudi Arabia to the global front.

Alongside the development project and with the aim of enhancing the artistic landscape of the city, 1000 pieces of art are planned to be publicly displayed in the city by the end of 2030. In the framework of Riyadh's development projects, an amount of SR 604 million has been awarded to develop and construct roads of Riyadh. On 3 July 2020, Bloomberg reported that Saudi Arabia has allocated $20 billion on the mega-project of tourism and culture in Riyadh, branded as Diriyah, while facing a double economic crisis after rise in coronavirus cases.

The Ministry of Investment and the Royal Commission for Riyadh City (RCRC) announced on 13 July 2021 that they have partnered with SEK Education Group to open SEK International School Riyadh, its first campus in Saudi Arabia. The new international school will welcome students from Pre-K (age 3 years) to Grade 12 (age 17/18 years), and will become one of the few schools in Riyadh accredited to offer the International Baccalaureate (IB) Primary Years Programme (PYP), Middle Years Programme (MYP), and Diploma Programme (DP).

In July 2024 the plan to create the Sports Boulevard, which will include the world's tallest sports tower, was approved. This is part of a $23 billion project meant to enlarge green spaces within the city.

=== Major development projects ===
Project	Announcement date	Status	Expected opening year	Total area (km^{2})	Cost	Website
Diriyah Gate	2017-07-20	Under Construction	2027	14	$62.2 billion	www.dgda.gov.sa/en
Qiddiya City	2017-04-07	Under Construction	2030	360	$9.8 billion	qiddiya.com/en/
Riyadh Metro	2013-06-09	Completed	2024		$25 billion	rpt.sa/en/
King Salman Park	2019-07-19	Under Construction	2025	17	$25 billion	kingsalmanpark.sa/en
New Murabba	2023-02-16	Under Construction	2030	19	$50 billion	newmurabba.com/en/
King Salman International Airport	2022-11-27	Planned	2030	57	$30 billion	
Sports Boulevard	2019-03-19	Partially Opened	2025	>6.7		sportsboulevard.sa/en
Mohammed Bin Salman Nonprofit City	2021-11-14	Under Construction	2026	3.4	$5.4 billion	miskcity.sa/en/
King Abdullah Gardens	2014-02-28	Under Construction	2026	2.5	$690 million	
Green Riyadh	2019-03-19	Ongoing				www.grg.sa
Riyadh Art	2019-03-19	Ongoing				riyadhart.sa/en/

== Culture and events ==
Riyadh hosts various annual events throughout the year, spanning cultural heritage, contemporary arts, and international business forums. These events range from local public festivals to high-level summits that attract global investment and tourism to the capital.

=== Jenadriyah ===
The Jenadriyah festival is an annual heritage and cultural festival held at a dedicated village grounds near Riyadh. The event acts as a showcase for Saudi Arabian culture, featuring folk dances like the Ardah, poetry readings, and traditional craft markets from different provinces. It is also well-known for hosting major heritage sports, particularly the annual camel races.

=== Riyadh International Book Fair ===
The Riyadh International Book Fair is a major cultural event held annually in the city. It is one of the largest book fairs in the region, bringing together hundreds of international, Arab, and local publishing houses for book signings, cultural seminars, and networking.

=== Riyadh Season ===
Riyadh Season is a massive city-wide entertainment and sports festival held every winter across different themed zones in Riyadh. The festival is a major hub for international sports, regularly hosting high-profile professional boxing matches, WWE wrestling events, and mixed martial arts bouts. In addition to sports, the festival features large-scale music concerts by international and Arab artists, theatrical plays, and family amusement parks.

=== Joy Awards ===
The Joy Awards is a major annual entertainment awards ceremony held in Riyadh during the winter season. It serves as one of the most prominent red-carpet events in the region, recognizing excellence across cinema, television, music, sports, and social media influence. The ceremony honors achievements from the Middle East and North Africa, and the international entertainment industry, drawing celebrities from around the globe.

=== Noor Riyadh ===
Noor Riyadh is an annual city-wide festival of light and art that uses public spaces across the capital as an open-air exhibition. The event features public installations, light sculptures, projections, and immersive media works created by both Saudi and international artists.

=== Future Investment Initiative ===
The Future Investment Initiative (FII) is an annual international economic forum held in Riyadh to discuss global investment trends. Informally referred to as the "Davos in the Desert", the conference serves as a platform for corporate executives, policymakers, and institutional investors to establish partnerships and discuss economic diversification under Saudi Vision 2030.

=== LEAP ===
LEAP is an annual technology convention hosted at the Riyadh Exhibition and Convention Center in Malham. The event brings together technology professionals, startups, and corporations to launch digital economy initiatives, artificial intelligence developments, and venture capital agreements within the region.

== See also ==
- Walled town of Riyadh
- Riyadh city fortifications
- Provinces of Saudi Arabia
- List of tourist attractions in Riyadh
- List of governorates of Saudi Arabia
- List of cities and towns in Saudi Arabia

== Bibliography ==
- Craze, Joshua (2009). The Kingdom: Saudi Arabia and the Challenge of the 21st Century. Hurst Publishers. ISBN 978-1-85065-897-9.
- Cybriwsky, Roman A. (23 May 2013). Capital Cities around the World: An Encyclopedia of Geography, History, and Culture. ABC-CLIO. ISBN 978-1-61069-248-9.
- Elsheshtawy, Yasser (27 May 2008). The Evolving Arab City: Tradition, Modernity and Urban Development. Routledge. ISBN 978-1-134-12821-1.
- Facey, William (1 January 1992). Riyadh, the Old City: From Its Origins Until the 1950s. Immel Publishing. ISBN 978-0-907151-32-6.
- Farsy, Fouad (1990). Modernity and Tradition: The Saudi Equation. Routledge. p. 22. ISBN 978-0-7103-0395-0.
- Ham, Anthony (2004). Saudi Arabia. Lonely Planet. ISBN 978-1-74059-667-1.
- Saud Al-Oteibi; Allen G. Noble; Frank J. Costa (February 1993). "The Impact of Planning on Growth and Development in Riyadh, Saudi Arabia, 1970-1990". GeoJournal. 29 (2): 163. Bibcode:1993GeoJo..29..163A. doi:10.1007/BF00812813.
- Menoret, Pascal (2014). Joyriding in Riyadh: Oil, Urbanism and Road Revolt. Cambridge University Press.
- Jordan, Craig (2011). The Travelling Triathlete: A Middle – Aged Man's Journey to Fitness. AuthorHouse. ISBN 978-1-4670-0081-9.
- Sloan, Stephen; Anderson, Sean K. (3 August 2009). Historical Dictionary of Terrorism. Scarecrow Press. ISBN 978-0-8108-6311-8.
- Sonbol, Amira (29 March 2012). Gulf Women (English ed.). Bloomsbury Qatar Foundation Publishing. ISBN 978-99921-94-84-3.
