= Baladiyya =

Arabic administrative division equivalent to municipality

A baladiyya (Arabic: بلدية, romanized: baladiyya; plural بلديات baladiyyāt) is a type of Arabic administrative division that can be translated as "district", "sub-district" or "municipality". The plural is baladiyat (Arabic: بلديات). Grammatically, it is the feminine of بلدي "rural, country-, folk-".

The Arabic term amanah (أمانة) is also used for "municipality".

== Arab countries ==
=== Sets ===
Specific set	Note
Communes of Algeria	Refer to tertiary level administration divisions.
Municipalities of Lebanon	Refer to tertiary level administration divisions.
Municipalities of Qatar	Top level
Baladiyat of Libya	Pre-1995 and post-2013
Municipalities of Damascus	

=== Other ===
- Western Region Municipality (بلدية المنطقة الغربية)
- Dubai Municipality (بلدية دبي)
- Unaizah Municipality (بلدية عنيزة)

== Turkish ==
In Turkish, the word belediye (definite accusative belediyesi), which is a loan from Arabic, means "municipality" or "city council".

== See also ==
- Opshtina
