= List of Saudi Vision 2030 projects =

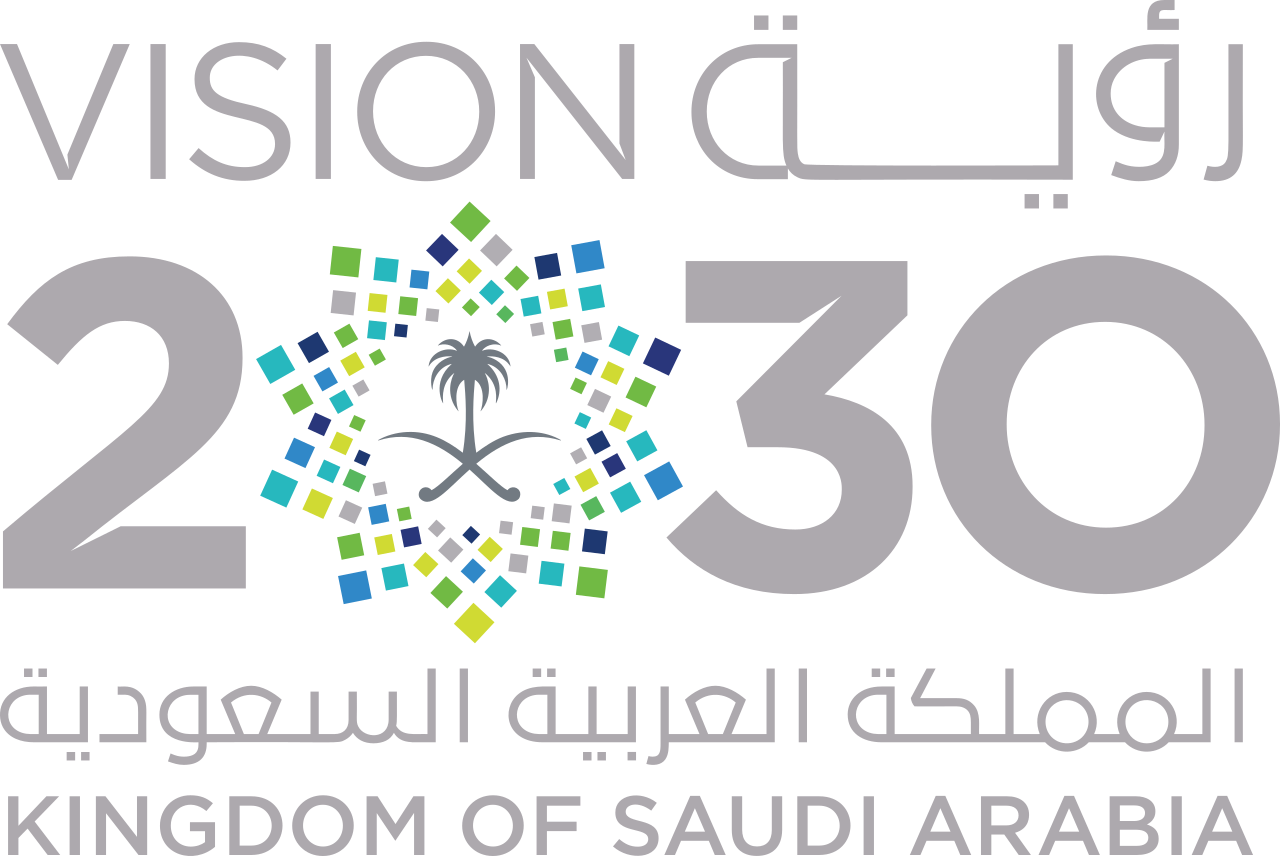
Vision 2030 logo

Saudi Vision 2030 is a Saudi Arabian government program launched by Crown Prince Mohammed bin Salman in January 2016. The program aims to diversify the Saudi economy away from oil, in addition to transforming the country both socially and culturally.

This following is a list of all projects that were announced as part of Vision 2030:

== List ==
=== Megaprojects ===
| Project | Location | Total area (km^{2}) | Announcement date | Expected completion | Cost | Website |
|---|---|---|---|---|---|---|
| NEOM, including The Line and Trojena | Tabuk | 26,500 | 2017-10-24 | Project scope under revision | $500 billion (initial proposal) | |
| Qiddiya City | South-west of Riyadh | 360 | 2017-04-08 | 2030 | $9.8 billion | |
| Red Sea Global, including The Red Sea Project and Amaala | Tabuk | 32,200 | 2017-07-31 | 2030 (first phase); 2035 (final phase) | $23.6 billion | |
| Roshn, including Sedra and Marafy | Multiple Locations | 200 | 2019-08-20 | 2026 | $1.9 billion | |
| Diriyah Gate | Diriyah | 7.1 | 2017-07-20 | 2027 | $63.2 billion | |

=== Tourism ===
| Project | Location | Total Area (km^{2}) | Announcement Date | Expected Completion | Cost | Website |
|---|---|---|---|---|---|---|
| King Salman Park, including the Royal Arts Complex | Riyadh | 16 | 2019-03-19 | 2027 | $23 billion | |
| Expo 2030 Site | Riyadh | 6.6 | 2023-11-28 | 2030 | $7.8 billion | |
| King Salman Gate | Mecca | 12 | 2025-10-15 | 2035 | $20 billion | |
| Masar Destination | Mecca | 1.2 | 2020-06-28 | 2030 | $26.66 billion | |
| Rua Al Madinah, including Islamic Civilization Village | Medina | 1.5 | 2022-08-24 | 2026 (first phase 2030 (final phase) | $37 billion | |
| The Rig | Persian Gulf | 0.3 | 2021-10-16 | 2030 | $5 billion | |
| Al-Ula Vision | Al-Ula | 22,500 | 2019-02-11 | 2027 | $15 billion | |
| Soudah Peaks | Asir | 627 | 2023-09-25 | 2029 | $7.7 billion | |
| Darin and Tarout Island Development | Eastern Province | 32 | 2022-11-24 | 2030 | $0.71 billion | |

=== Communities ===
| Project | Location | Total Area (km^{2}) | Announcement Date | Expected Completion | Cost | Website |
|---|---|---|---|---|---|---|
| New Murabba, including Mukaab | Riyadh | 19 | 2023-02-16 | 2030 | $50 billion | |
| Sports Boulevard | Riyadh | 135 | 2019-05-19 | 2027 | $23 billion | |
| Mohammed Bin Salman Nonprofit City | Riyadh | 3.4 | 2021-11-14 | 2035 | $5.4 billion | |
| Jeddah Central | Jeddah | 5.7 | 2021-12-17 | 2027 (first phase); 2030 (final phase) | $19.9 billion | |

=== Pre-Vision 2030 projects ===
| Project | Location | Total Area (km^{2}) | Announcement Date | Expected Completion | Cost | Website |
|---|---|---|---|---|---|---|
| Riyadh Metro | Riyadh | | 2012-04-23 | 2024 (Completed) | $22.5 billion | |
| King Abdullah Gardens | Riyadh | 2.5 | 2014-02-28 | 2029 | $200 million | |
| Jeddah Economic City, including Jeddah Tower | Jeddah | 5.3 | 2011-08-01 | 2028 | $30 billion | |

=== Energy and sustainability ===
| Project | Location | Total Area (km^{2}) | Announcement Date | Expected Completion | Cost | Website |
|---|---|---|---|---|---|---|
| King Salman Energy Park | Between Dammam and Al-Ahsa | 50 | 2018-12-05 | 2021 (first phase) | $1.6 billion | |
| Al Khafji Desalination Plant | Al Khafji | 0.1875 | 2015 | 2018 | $130 million | |
| Rabigh Desalination Plant | Rabigh | | 2017 | 2022 | $687 million | |
| The Solar PV Cell & Module Manufacturing Plant | Tabuk Province | .027 | 2010 | 2021-11-18 | $186.6 million | |
| Sakaka Solar Power Plant | Sakaka | 6 | 2017 | 2021 | $302 million | |
| The Low Power Research Reactor | Riyadh | | 2018 | 2019 | | |
| Dumat Al Jandal Wind Farm | Al Jouf | | 2019 | 2022 | $500 million | |

=== Initiatives ===
| Initiative | Description | Launched | Website |
|---|---|---|---|
| Made in Saudi | Certificate marks designating the claim that Saudi Arabia is the country at which a product originates. | 2021 | |
| Saudi Genome Program | Program aimed at establishing Saudi Arabia as a leading country in genomics research and its healthcare applications. | 2018 | |
| Green Riyadh | The initiative aims at increasing Riyadh's green space per capita via planting 75 million trees all around the city by 2030. | 2019 | |
| Saudi Green Initiative | The initiative oversees Saudi Arabia's 2060 net-zero carbon emission goals and the transition to a green economy through emissions reduction, afforestation, and land and sea protection. | 2021 | |
| The Middle East Green Initiative | Regional alliance to mitigate the effects of climate change impacting both Middle East and North Africa through collective collaboration with neighboring countries. | 2021 | |
| Shareek Program | Shareek focuses on supporting large Saudi private sector companies. | 2021 | |
| Riyadh Art | Riyadh Art aims to transform Riyadh into an art hub by giving artists the chance to display and implement their talent in public spaces. | 2019 | |
| Special Economic Zones | The initiative targets turning Saudi Arabia into an attractive destination for global investors by introducing unique legislations and reducing regulations in special economic zones. | 2023 | |

=== Major companies ===
| Company | Industry | Founded | Website |
|---|---|---|---|
| Alat | Semiconductors – Consumer electronics | 2024-02-01 | |
| Humain | Artificial Intelligence | 2025-05-12 | |
| Riyadh Air | Airline | 2023-05-12 | |
| Ceer Motors | Automotive | 2022-11-02 | |
| Boutique Group | Hospitality | 2022-01-20 | |
| Saudi Downtown Company | Urban development – Real estate development | 2022-10-03 | |
| Savvy Games Group | Gaming – Esports | 2022-01-26 | |
| Esports Foundation and Esports World Cup | Esports | 2023-10-23 | |
| Al-Ula Development Company | Hospitality – Real estate development | 2023-01-30 | |
| Al Balad Development Company | Hospitality; Tourism | 2023-10-03 | |
| Jeddah Central Development Company | Urban Development – Real estate development | 2021-12-17 | |
| Soudah Development Company | Real estate development – Tourism | 2021-02-24 | |

=== Other projects ===
| Project | Location | Announcement Date | Cost | Website |
|---|---|---|---|---|
| Development of Historical Mosques | Multiple Locations | 2018-11-12 | $13.3 million | |
| Expansion of Quba Mosque | Medina | 2022-04-08 | | |
