= Made in Saudi =

Government initiative to encourage manufacturing in Saudi Arabia

Made in Saudi (MiS)
- صنع في السعودية
- Founder: Mohammed bin Salman
- Country: Saudi Arabia
- Ministry: Saudi Export Development Authority
- Key people: Bandar bin Ibrahim Al-Khorayef, Minister of Industry and Mineral Resources
- Established: 28 March 2021; 5 years ago
- Status: Active
- Website: saudimade.sa/en

Made in Saudi (MiS; Arabic: صنع في السعودية), also referred to as Saudi Made, are certification marks designating a claim that Saudi Arabia is the country of origin of a good. The initiative was launched in line with the Saudi Vision 2030 by Saudi crown prince Mohammed bin Salman in March 2021 to encourage domestic production and services within the country. It is enforced by the Saudi Export Development Authority through stylisation SAUDI MADE and is part of the National Industrial Development and Logistics Program (NIDLP).

The initiative was launched by Minister of Industry and Mineral Resources Bandar bin Ibrahim al-Khorayef in March 2021 under the auspices of Crown Prince Mohammed bin Salman. As per the analysts, the program would let the private sector contribute an estimated 65% increase in the national GDP while expecting the non-oil domestic sector to surge from 16% to 50% by 2030.

== Objectives ==
According to the website of Saudi Vision 2030, the objectives of Made in Saudi program are:

- Promoting Saudi products and services locally, regionally and internationally
- Encouraging national companies to join the program.
- Raising awareness and confidence in national products and services among local and foreign consumers.
- Enhancing interaction between members of national companies and transfer experience and expertise between them through workshops and interactive meetings.
- Launching a unified identity that contributes to raising the quality of national products and services.
- Increasing Saudi non-oil exports in priority export markets.
- Enhancing the attractiveness of the Saudi industrial sector to the domestic and foreign investments.

== Partners ==
- Amazon Saudi Arabia announced the launch of a new storefront titled “Made in Saudi” on its website, featuring thousands of locally produced items certified under the Made in Saudi program. The store is designed to showcase national industries to millions of shoppers on the platform, support the growth of small and medium-sized enterprises, and strengthen the entrepreneurship ecosystem in line with Saudi Vision 2030. It also offers local sellers an opportunity to expand their presence in e-commerce and present distinctive Saudi products that attract customers across the Kingdom.
- The Saudi Export Development Authority (Saudi Exports) is a government body that began its operations in 2013. It focuses on increasing non-oil Saudi exports and enhancing access to global markets by leveraging the Kingdom's economic capabilities. Its mission includes improving the export environment through dedicated programs, providing incentives to exporters, promoting Saudi products internationally, boosting their competitiveness, and ensuring their successful entry into global markets.

Other partners include:

- The National Industrial Development and Logistics Program (NIDLP)
- King Abdullah Economic City
- The Saudi Food and Drug Authority (SFDA)
- The Saudi Center for International Strategic Partnerships

== See also ==
- List of Saudi Vision 2030 Projects
- Alat
- Ceer Motors
