= Sawani (company) =

Camel dairy company based in Saudi Arabia

- Native name: سواني
- Type: Private
- Industry: Camel Dairy
- Founded: 20 July 2023; 3 years ago
- Founder: Public Investment Fund
- Headquarters: Riyadh, Saudi Arabia
- Key people: Ahmed Gamal El Din (CEO)
- Owner: Public Investment Fund
- Subsidiaries: Noug
- Website: sawani.com/en

Sawani (Arabic: سواني) is a camel dairy company based in Riyadh, Saudi Arabia. The company was founded in January 2023 by the Public Investment Fund as part of Saudi Vision 2030. Sawani is the parent company of Noug, a company specializing in camel dairy products.

== History ==
Sawani was officially launched by the Public Investment Fund on January 20, 2023, as part of Saudi Vision 2030 plan to diversify the Saudi Economy away from oil.

In September 2023, Sawani's subsidiary "Noug" launched its first camel dairy product branch in Riyadh.

In December 2023, Noug signed a MoU with Al Balad Development Company to provide its product to the visitors of the UNESCO World Heritage Site, Al-Balad.

Swani launched two stores in Jeddah and Makkah on February 29, 2024.

== See also ==
- Saudi Vision 2030
- Camel milk
