= KAIG =

KAIG may refer to:

- KAIG (FM), a radio station (89.9 FM) in Dodge City, Kansas United States
- Langlade County Airport, an airport near Antigo, Wisconsin, assigned the ICAO code KAIG
- King Abdullah International Gardens
