= Sports Boulevard =

Proposed park in Riyadh, Saudi Arabia

- المسار الرياضي

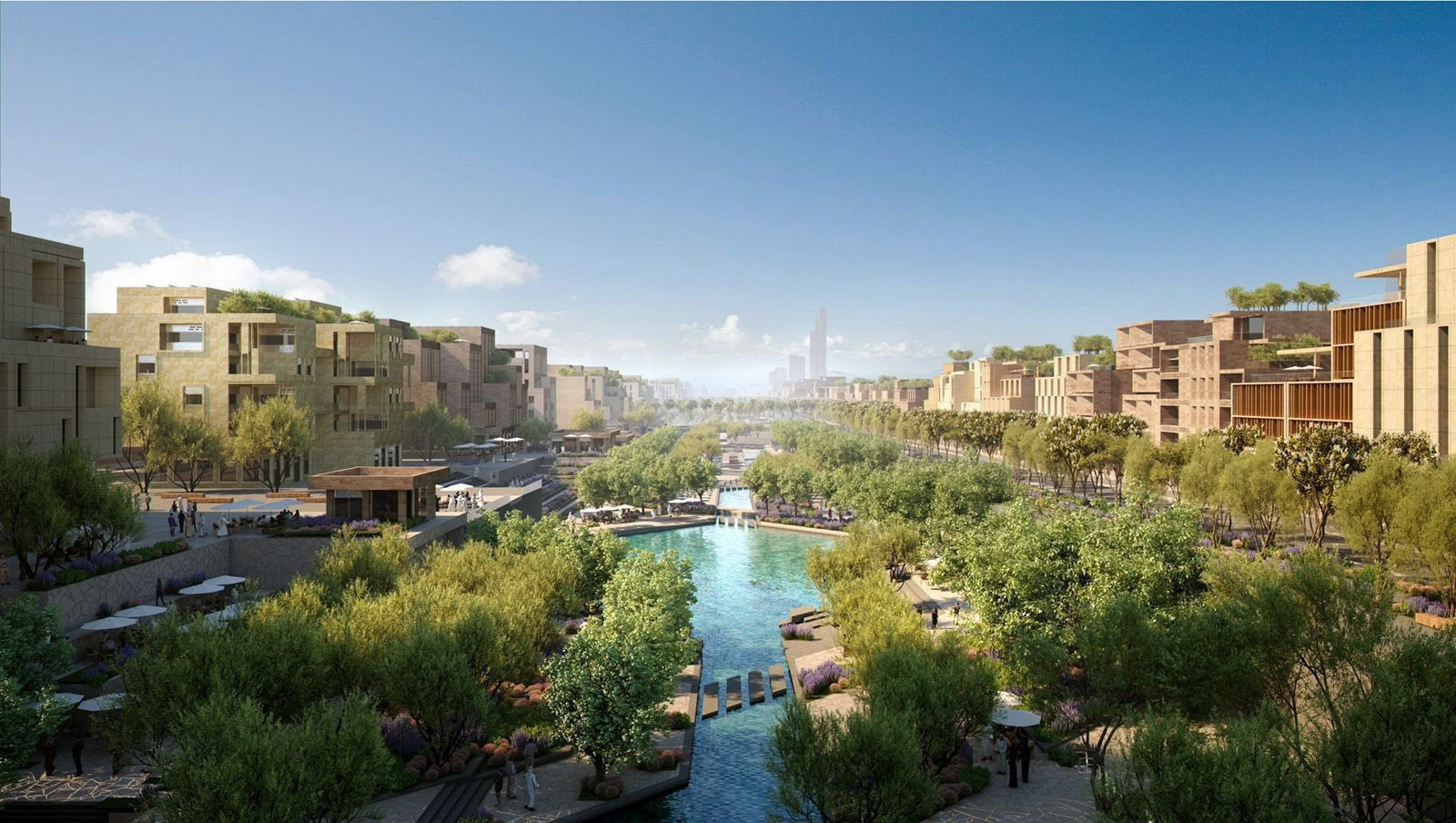
- Type: Linear park
- Location: Riyadh, Saudi Arabia
- Area: 135 km (length); 3.5 km² (open spaces)
- Opened: 27 February 2025 (Phase 1)
- Owner: Government of Saudi Arabia
- Operator: Sports Boulevard Foundation
- Status: Partially open / under development
- Website: sportsboulevard.sa

Sports Boulevard (Arabic: المسار الرياضي) is a large-scale linear park located in Riyadh, Saudi Arabia. Spanning 135 kilometers, it is set to become the world's longest linear park. The project was launched by King Salman on 19 March 2019 as part of Saudi Vision 2030. The first phase of the park opened to the public on 27 February 2025. The project is supervised and operated by the Sports Boulevard Foundation, with its chairman Crown Prince Mohammed bin Salman.

== Background ==
The project was launched in 2019 as a part of the Kingdom of Saudi Arabia's Vision 2030.

The Sports Boulevard was one of four initiatives established in 2019 along with King Salman Park, Riyadh Art and Green Riyadh with an estimated cost of $23 billion in government funding.

In 2019, when the project was launched, it was expected to provide production jobs, followed by more service jobs on an ongoing basis. In April 2022, Jayne McGivern was appointed the CEO of the Sports Boulevard Foundation.

In October 2021, the foundation was awarded contracts worth $661.5 million for the project's construction phase one.

In July 2024, Crown Prince Mohammed bin Salman announced the Global Sports Tower as part of the Sports Boulevard. Standing 130m high, the tower will be the tallest of its kind and will include 30 different sports facilities.

In February 2025, the first phase of the project was officially opened to the public. The first phase included five key destinations, which are:

- Wadi Hanifah
- The Promenade
- A section at the intersection of Prince Mohammed bin Salman bin Abdulaziz Rd. and Prince Turki bin Abdulaziz Al-Awwal Rd.
- Princess Nourah bint Abdulrahman University internal loop
- The first phase of Sands Sports Park.

This marked the completion of 40% of the project.

== Location and districts ==
The Sports Boulevard is located in Riyadh and stretches 135 km connecting Wadi Hanifa in the west with Wadi Al-Sulai in the east through Prince Mohammed bin Salman Road and has 8 diverse districts, Wadi Hanifah District, Arts District, Wadi Alyasen District, Entertainment District, Athletics District, Sand Sports Park, Eco District and Wadi Al-Sulai District.

== See also ==
- King Salman Park
- Saudi Vision 2030
- List of Saudi Vision 2030 projects
