= Rua Al Madinah =

Urban Development Project in Medina

- رؤى المدينة

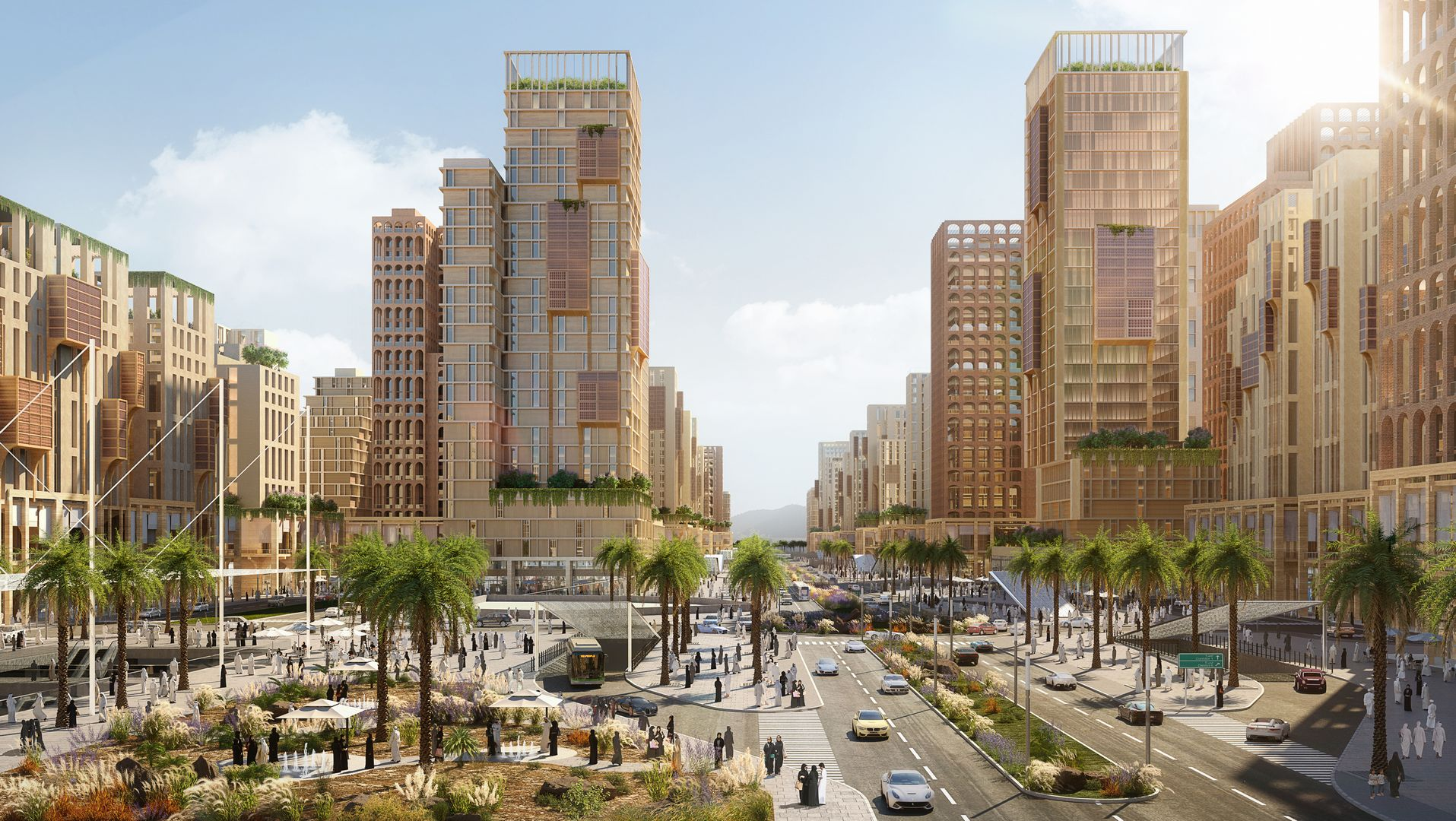
- Location: Medina, Saudi Arabia
- Owner: Public Investment Fund
- Founder: Mohammed bin Salman
- Key people: Mohammed Al Khalil (Chairman); Naif Al Hamdan (Vice Chairman); Ahmad Al Juhani (CEO)
- Established: 24 August 2022; 3 years ago
- Website: ruaalmadinah.com

Rua Al Madinah (Arabic: رؤى المدينة) is a real estate development project under construction in Medina, Saudi Arabia. The Rua Al Madinah project was developed by Rua Al Madinah Holding Company, one of the companies founded by the Saudi Public Investment Fund. The project was officially announced by Crown Prince Mohammed bin Salman in August 2022. Once complete, the project will allow Medina to host up to 30 million Umrah pilgrims by 2030. The project will cover a total area of 1.5 km^{2}.

As part of Saudi Arabia's Vision 2030 to diversify the Saudi economy away from oil, Rua Al Madinah Holding Co. says that the project will create 93,000 jobs and contribute more than $37.25 billion to Saudi Arabia's national GDP by the year 2030.

The first phase of the project is set to be completed by 2026. By 2030, Rua Al Madinah aims to construct 47,000 hotel rooms.

== History ==
Rua Al Madinah was officially announced by Crown Prince Mohammed bin Salman on 24 August 2022 as part of Vision 2030.

In February 2023, Hyatt signed a deal to open 3 hotels consisting of 1,729 rooms in Rua Al Madinah.

In March 2023, Marriott signed an agreement to open 8 hotels in Rua Al Madinah, contributing to 4,400 rooms across different brands.

In May 2023, Accor signed a deal to develop over 1,000 hotel rooms in the project.

== Islamic Civilization Village ==
On January 8, 2024, Rua Al Madinah announced the Islamic Civilization Village, a cultural and education center themed around Islamic Heritage. The village consists of 8 cultural zones, including the Arabian Peninsula, Mashriq, Islamic South Asia, Maghrib, SEAN, the Silk Road, Al-Andalus and Africa. The village will cover an area of 257,000 m^{2}.

== See also ==
- List of Saudi Vision 2030 Projects
- Saudi Vision 2030
- Masar Destination
- Jeddah Central
- Neom
