= Riyadh Art =

Public art project in Saudi Arabia

Riyadh art الرياض آرت
- Locations: Riyadh, Saudi Arabia
- Country: Saudi Arabia
- Founded: 19 March 2019; 7 years ago
- Website: riyadhart.rcrc.gov.sa/en/

Riyadh Art is a public art project in Saudi Arabia. It is one of Riyadh’s four megaprojects launched by King Salman bin Abdulaziz in March 2019, and one of the largest public art projects in the world. It is overseen by the National Megaprojects Committee led by Crown Prince Mohammed bin Salman bin Abdulaziz, Prime Minister and Chairman of the Board of Directors of the Royal Commission for Riyadh City. The project is one of the initiatives that contribute to the Kingdom’s Vision 2030.

Turning the Saudi Capital into an open-air art gallery, Riyadh Art will install more than 1,000 artworks and landmarks created by local and international artists across the city’s public spaces. Annual art events are bringing additional creative experiences to Riyadh.

== Project vision ==
Riyadh Art gives people in the city new cultural, artistic, and recreational experiences that will contribute to the city’s quality of life.

== Project Programs ==
Riyadh Art is structured around ten permanent programs and two annual festivals, designed to integrate art into the city’s built environment, public spaces, and cultural life. The initiative plans to install more than 1,000 artworks and landmarks by local and international artists across residential neighborhoods, gardens, parks, squares, metro and bus stations, bridges, city entrances, and tourism destinations.

The programs include:

1. Riyadh Icon – An international commission to create a distinctive landmark symbolizing the cultural aspirations of Vision 2030.
2. Garden City – A sculpture park featuring contemporary and interactive artworks.
3. Hidden River – Art Trail – Sculptures and installations along Riyadh’s wadis, reflecting the area’s history, heritage, and ecology.
4. Hidden River – Illuminated Bridges – Lighting installations on key bridges across the city.
5. Urban Flow – Public art integrated into pedestrian and cycling networks.
6. Art in Transit – Artistic designs incorporated into metro and bus rapid transit stations.
7. Art on the Move – Large-scale works at major intersections and transport routes.
8. Welcoming Gateways – Iconic entry points to the city featuring public art.
9. Jewels in Riyadh – Site-specific artworks at civic, cultural, and tourist sites.
10. Joyous Gardens – Artist-designed playgrounds and creative play areas in parks.
11. Urban Art Lab – Public art pavilions combining exhibition, education, and artist–community interaction.

The project’s two annual festivals are:

- Tuwaiq International Sculpture Symposium – An annual event bringing together local and international sculptors to create permanent public artworks.
- Noor Riyadh – A citywide light art festival featuring large-scale installations, projections, exhibitions, and public programs.

According to the Royal Commission for Riyadh City, these programs aim to enhance Riyadh’s position among the world’s most liveable cities, promote tourism, and foster a global creative exchange.

== Noor Riyadh ==
Noor Riyadh is an annual celebration of light, art, and life, with light-based artworks across the city.

- The first edition of Noor Riyadh was held from March 18 to April 3, 2021, at King Abdullah Financial District (KAFD) based on the theme “Under One Sky” with the participation of more than 60 artists from over 20 countries; two of the artworks were of a scale that actually set world records: Beacon and Star in Motion.
- The second edition of Noor Riyadh had the theme “We Dream of New Horizons” and took place between November 3 to 19, 2022. It featured 190 artworks at 40 locations – ranging from creative light mediums to light sculptures. The festival included an art auction at the JAX District in Diriyah, which took place on 14 and 15 November as one of Riyadh Art’s charitable initiatives.

This edition of Noor Riyadh featured the world’s largest display of lighting art, including the Pulse of Light by French show designer Martin Arnaud and the light installation The Order of Chaos: Chaos in Order by American artist Marc Brickman.

- In November 2023, Noor Riyadh’s third edition had the theme “The Bright Side of the Desert Moon.” Taking place at five main locations across Riyadh – King Abdullah Financial District, JAX District, Salam Park, Wadi Hanifa, and Wadi Namar. More than 100 artists from 35 countries participated, among them 35 Saudi artists. The event showcased 120 artworks, including large-scale installations, immersive projections, drone shows, light reflections on various buildings, and interactive artworks. The event also included an accompanying exhibition titled “Refracted Identities, Shared Futures,” held at the JAX District in Diriyah from November 2023 to March 2024, which attracted 32 artists from Saudi Arabia and around the world.

== Tuwaiq Sculpture ==
Sculptures are a key expression of art in the public space, and Riyadh Art is supporting the art form through the annual Tuwaiq International Sculpture Symposium.

=== First Edition ===
In March 2019, the first edition of the Tuwaiq International Sculpture Symposium was held with 23 artists from Saudi Arabia and around the world taking part.

=== Second Edition ===
The second edition of the Tuwaiq International Sculpture Symposium was held in January 2020 with the participation of 20 artists from Saudi Arabia and around the world.

=== Third Edition ===
The third edition of the Tuwaiq International Sculpture Symposium was held in November 2021 under the theme “The Poetics of Space” at Diriyah’s JAX District, gathering 20 artists from 16 countries, including Saudi Arabia.

=== Fourth Edition ===
Tuwaiq Sculpture 2023 was launched in January 2023. This fourth edition of the event had the theme “Energy of Harmony” and displayed more than 1,000 artworks across Riyadh; the symposium was joined by 30 artists from Saudi Arabia and 20 countries around the world.

=== Fifth Edition ===
The fifth edition of Tuwaiq Sculpture was held between 12 and 24 February 2024 under the theme “Dimensions of Movement” and saw the participation of 30 artists representing 20 countries.

== See also ==
- List of Saudi Vision 2030 Projects
- Riyadh Green
- King Salman Park
- Sports Boulevard
