= Ceer =

Ceer or CEER may refer to:

- Ceer Motors, a Saudi electric vehicle company
- Council of European Energy Regulators, a non-profit organization
- Centers for Excellence in ELSI Research, at the US National Human Genome Research Institute

== See also ==
- CEERS, the Cosmic Evolution Early Release Science Survey
