= Noor Riyadh =

Annual light and art festival

Noor Riyadh نور الرياض
- Genre: Light art festival
- Locations: Riyadh, Saudi Arabia
- Country: Saudi Arabia
- Years active: 2021–present
- Inaugurated: 18 March 2021; 5 years ago
- Attendance: 3 million (2024)
- Website: riyadhart.sa/en/noor-riyadh/

Noor Riyadh (Arabic: نور الرياض) is an annual light art festival held in Riyadh, Saudi Arabia. Considered the largest light art festival in the world, the festival draws approximately 3 million visitors each year. It features large-scale outdoor light installations, projections, immersive environments, and interactive works by both local and international artists. The festival also includes public talks, guided tours, creative workshops, community programmes, and up until 2023 an accompanying exhibition.

The event takes place over several weeks each year, with artworks installed across multiple sites in Riyadh, including urban landmarks, public parks, heritage locations, and natural landscapes such as Wadi Hanifa and the King Abdulaziz Historical Center. Past editions have featured building projections, illuminated sculptures, drone performances, laser shows, and multimedia works, transforming the city into a temporary "gallery without walls."

Noor Riyadh is organised under the umbrella of Riyadh Art, a public art initiative launched by King Salman bin Abdulaziz Al Saud as part of Crown Prince Mohammed bin Salman’s Vision 2030 programme to enhance cultural life and public art in the Kingdom. Riyadh Art is led by executive director, architect Khalid Al-Hazani, with the festival directed by Nouf Al Moneef.

== First edition (2021) ==
The inaugural edition took place from 18 March to 3 April 2021 under the theme Under One Sky. It featured 60 works by artists from 20 countries across 13 locations in the city. The festival was curated by Dr. Eiman Elgibreen (Saudi Arabia) and Pam Toonen (Netherlands).

The accompanying exhibition, "Light Upon Light: Light Art since the 1960s", was curated by Susan Davidson (United States) and Raneem Farsi (Saudi Arabia), and presented works by 30 artists exploring the evolution of light as an artistic medium.

Guinness World Records

In 2021, Noor Riyadh achieved two Guinness World Records:

- Largest LED structure – Beacon, a monumental LED installation visible across the city.
- Brightest suspended ornament – Star in Motion, suspended atop Kingdom Centre Tower.

== Second edition (2022) ==
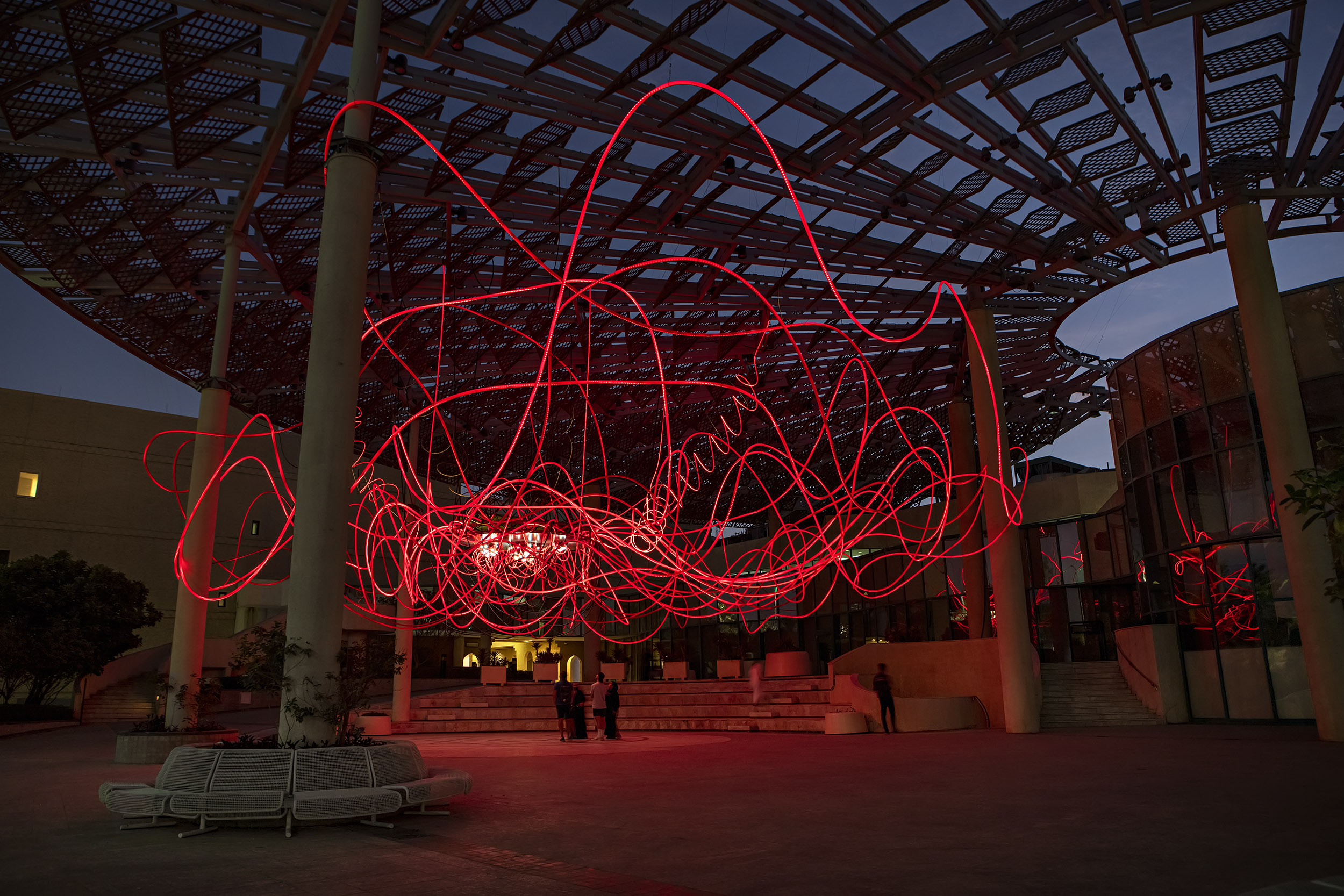
Amplexus light sculpture installation by Grimanesa Amorós, apart of the second edition of Noor Riyadh.

Held from 3 to 19 November 2022, the second edition was themed We Dream of New Horizons. The festival was curated by Dorothy Di Stefano (Australia), Hervé Mikaeloff (France), and Jumana Ghouth (Saudi Arabia), and presented around 82 public artworks across 40 locations citywide, including neighborhood parks and major landmarks. Over 40 Saudi artists participated. The accompanying exhibition, From Spark to Spirit, curated by Neville Wakefield (United States) and Gaida AlMogren (Saudi Arabia), explored the history and contemporary practice of light art at JAX District.

Guinness World Records

In 2022, Noor Riyadh achieved six Guinness World Records:

- Largest light art festival – Noor Riyadh, featuring 190 artworks by 130 artists across 40 locations.
- Most drones performing an aerial dance display – the order of chaos: chaos in order.
- Longest distance covered by a laser light show – Pulse of Light.
- Largest laser show (area covered) – Pulse of Light.
- Highest mesh screen on a building – Pulse of Light.
- Largest mesh screen on a building – Pulse of Light.

== Third edition (2023) ==
The third edition took place from 30 November to 16 December 2023 under the theme The Bright Side of the Desert Moon. The festival was led by Jérôme Sans (Festival Lead Curator) with curators Pedro Alonzo, Fahad bin Naif, and Alaa Tarabzouni. The accompanying exhibition was led by Neville Wakefield (Exhibition Lead Curator) with Maya Al Athel as Exhibition Curator. In total, 120 artworks by over 100 artists from 35 countries—including 35 Saudi artists—were installed across King Abdullah Financial District, JAX District, Salam Park, Wadi Hanifa, and Wadi Namar.

The exhibition, Refracted Identities, Shared Futures, ran at JAX District from November 2023 to March 2024 and included talks, workshops, and community programs in addition to the artworks on view.

Guinness World Records

In 2023, Noor Riyadh achieved six Guinness World Records:

- Largest temporary skatepark – Block Cubes by Yinka Ilori, a 600 m² skate-able obstacle course at King Fahad National Library.
- Most drones launched in a week – Desert Swarm by DRIFT (3,000 drones).
- Largest drone/multirotor bird swarm – Desert Swarm by DRIFT.
- Largest interactive projection-mapped display – Magic Carpet – Origin of the World by Miguel Chevalier (KAFD).
- Most lights used in a temporary light and sound show – DIALOGUE by Christopher Bauder (557 moving lights, four high‑power lasers, synchronized soundtrack).
- Most lights in a light show on a single building – DIALOGUE by Christopher Bauder.

== Fourth edition (2024) ==
The fourth edition ran from 28 November to 14 December 2024 under the theme Light Years Apart, curated by Dr. Effat Abdullah Fadag (Saudi Arabia) and Dr. Alfredo Cramerotti (Italy). More than 60 large-scale artworks by artists from 18 countries were presented across King Abdulaziz Historical Center, JAX District, and Wadi Hanifa. This edition was the first without an accompanying exhibition.

Guinness World Records

In 2024, Noor Riyadh achieved two Guinness World Records, bringing the festival’s total to 16 titles:

- Longest distance covered by a laser beam in a laser show – Higher Power by Chris Levine, a 1‑kilowatt laser projected from Faisaliah Tower in four directions across Riyadh, encoding the word "Salaam" in Morse code.
- Largest illuminated recyclable‑material pyramid artwork – The Fifth Pyramid by Rashed Al‑Shashai, a 28‑metre‑high pyramid constructed from petrochemical pallets and other sustainable materials.

== Public programming ==
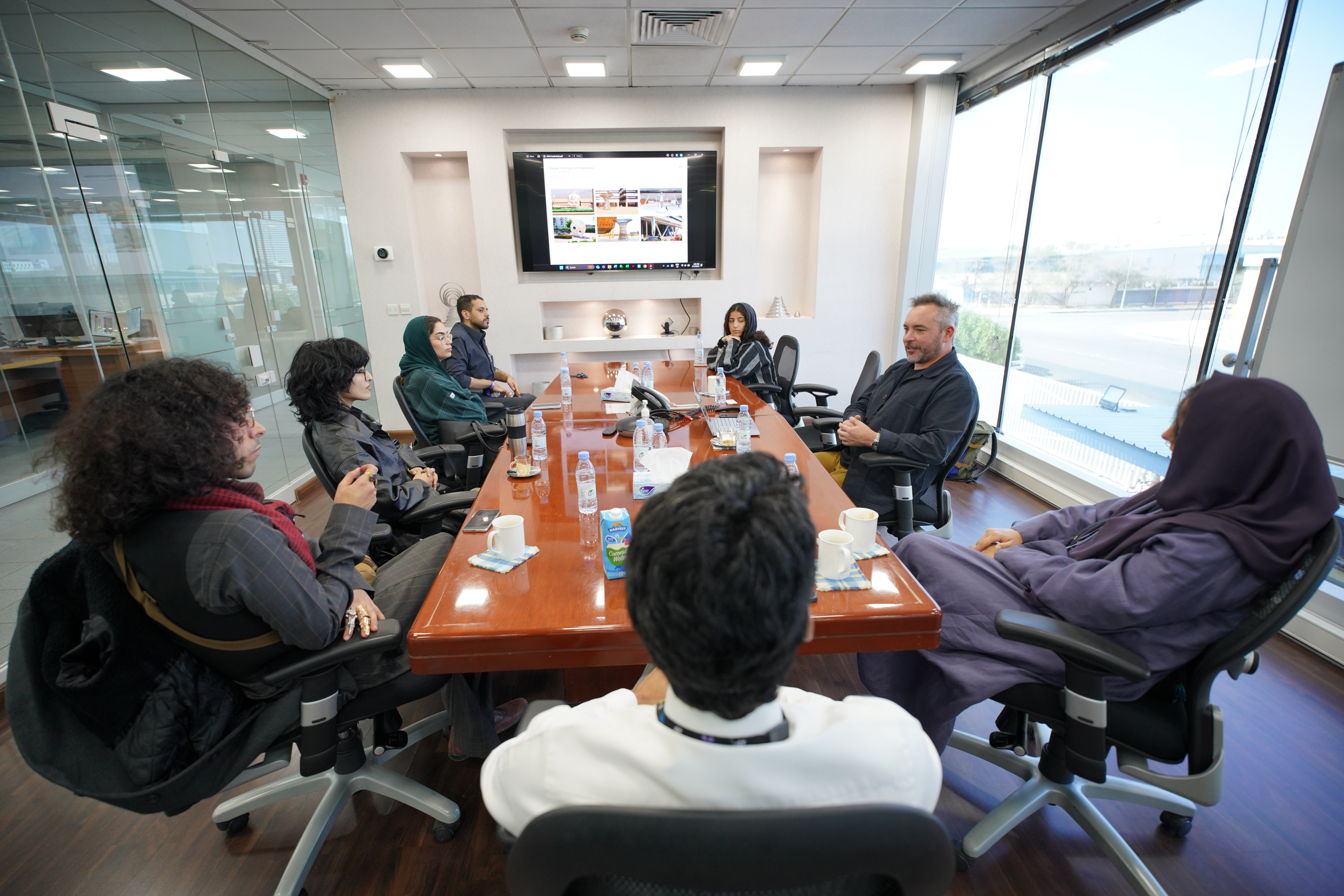
Noor Riyadh 2024 Apprenticeship Programme

Noor Riyadh’s public programming during the festival includes artist talks, guided tours, and creative workshops, aimed at engaging audiences of all ages. A central initiative is the Noor Riyadh Apprenticeship Programme, which offers Saudi participants hands-on training in curatorial support, art handling, production, lighting, and visitor engagement. Conducted in the weeks leading up to and during the festival, the programme enables apprentices to work alongside curators, artists, and technical teams, providing practical experience in delivering a large-scale international art event and fostering skills development within the Kingdom’s cultural sector.

== See also ==
- Riyadh Art
- Kingdom Centre
- Al Faisaliyah Center
