= Soudah Development Company =

Company based in Saudi Arabia

- Native name: السودة للتطوير
- Company type: Privately held company
- Industry: Real Estate Developer
- Founded: 24 February 2021; 5 years ago
- Founder: Mohammed bin Salman
- Headquarters: Riyadh, Riyadh Province, Saudi Arabia
- Key people: Mohammed bin Salman (Chairman); Saleh Aloraini (CEO)
- Owner: Public Investment Fund
- Subsidiaries: Soudah Peaks
- Website: soudah.sa/en/

Soudah Development Company (SDC; Arabic: السودة للتطوير) is a real estate development company based in Riyadh, Saudi Arabia. The company was founded in February 2021 by Crown Prince Mohammed bin Salman as part of Saudi Vision 2030. SDC is owned by the Public Investment Fund. The company is responsible for the development of the luxury mountain tourism destination of Soudah Peaks.

== History ==
SDC was officially launched by Mohammed bin Salman in February 24, 2021, as part of Saudi Vision 2030 plan to diversify the Saudi Economy away from oil.

== Projects ==
=== Soudah Peaks ===
In September 2023, Soudah Development Company launched Soudah Peaks, a mountain tourism destination built on Jabal Soudah, Saudi Arabia's highest peak at a height of 3,015 m. The project consists of 6 different regions, including Rijal Almaa Heritage Village.

== See also ==
- List of Saudi Vision 2030 Projects
- Jabal Soudah
- Al Balad Development Company
- Jeddah Central Development Company
- Al-Ula Development Company
