= Trojena =

Mountain tourism project in Tabuk, Saudi Arabia

Trojena تروجينا (Arabic)
- City

- Location within Saudi Arabia
- Coordinates: 28°41′17.6604″N 35°17′46.5936″E
- Country: Saudi Arabia
- Province: Tabuk
- City: Neom
- Announced: 3 March 2022; 4 years ago
- Founder: Mohammed bin Salman

Government
  - Regional Head: Giles Pendleton

Area
  - Total: 60 km^{2} (23 sq mi)
- Elevation: 1,500–2,600 m (4,900–8,500 ft)
- Time zone: UTC+03:00 (Arabian Standard Time)
- Website: www.neom.com/en-us/regions/trojena

Trojena (Arabic: تروجينا) is a mountain tourism destination under construction in Neom, Tabuk Province, Saudi Arabia. Trojena is one of the various announced regions of NEOM and will be located 50 km (31 mi) from the Gulf of Aqaba, covering a total area of 60 km^{2} (23 sq mi) with an elevation ranging from 1,500–2,600 m (4,900–8,500 ft) above sea level. The tourism destination is part of Saudi Vision 2030 and when announced in 2022 was set to be completed by 2027.

A 2023 review of the project found that costs had surged by over $10 billion, leading the project to fall below the internal rate of return. An internal audit found evidence of financial manipulation to justify the cost overruns and obfuscate problems related to the project. In 2026, the 2029 Asian Winter Games were moved from Trojena to Almaty, Kazakhstan, and several key contracts for Trojena construction, including the dam and the supply of structural steel, were cancelled.

== Background ==
The region aims to attract 700,000 visitors and 7,000 permanent residents by the year 2030. Trojena is expected to contribute to the Kingdom's GDP by $800 million and create 10,000 jobs.

Trojena will consist of a ski village, a variety of restaurants and retail stores, ultra-luxury family and health resorts, in addition to sports activities such as mountain biking, ski slope, water sports, and an interactive nature reserve. According to the Saudi Press Agency, the all-year-round average temperature will be 10 °C (18 °F) below neighbouring regions, and will drop below freezing during winter times.

== History ==
Trojena was announced on 3 March 2022 by crown prince Mohammed bin Salman as part of Saudi Arabia's megacity, Neom. The project was announced inline with Saudi Arabia's Vision 2030 goals to diversify the country's economy away from fossil fuels by growing its tourism sector.

On 3 August 2022, the Saudi Arabian Olympic and Paralympic Committee (SOPC) submitted a letter of interest to the Olympic Council of Asia (OCA) to host the 10th Asian Winter Games in Trojena. On 5 October 2022, Saudi Arabia was officially chosen to host the 2029 Asian Winter Games at Trojena. However, on 24 January 2026, the Olympic Council of Asia announced that the Games would be postponed to a later date, and on 2 February 2026, the Olympic Council of Asia announced that the Games would be held in Almaty, Kazakhstan.

Since its announcement, several hotel projects have been planned for Trojena, including the 60-key Collective Trojena (2026), the 270-key Anantara Trojena (2026), the 105-key Raffles Trojena (2027), the 236-key W Trojena, the 500-key JW Marriott Trojena, and a currently unnamed 60-key Ritz-Carlton Reserve.

== See also ==
- List of Saudi Vision 2030 Projects
- Saudi Vision 2030
- The Line, Saudi Arabia
