= 2029 Asian Winter Games =

Multi-sport event in Almaty, Kazakhstan

X Asian Winter Games
- Host city: Almaty, Kazakhstan

Summer

Winter

The 2029 Asian Winter Games (Kazakh: 2029 жылғы қысқы Азия ойындары, romanized: 2029 jylğy qysqy Azia oiyndary; officially known as the 10th Asian Winter Games, and commonly known as Almaty 2029 (Kazakh: Алматы 2029), will be the tenth edition of the Asian Winter Games, a pan-Asian winter multi-sport event to be held in Almaty, Kazakhstan.

== Bidding process ==
Saudi Arabia's planned city of Neom was originally elected as the host city at the 41st OCA General Assembly on 4 October 2022 in Phnom Penh, Cambodia. This would have been the first Asian Winter Games held in Saudi Arabia, as well as in the Arabian Peninsula, and an Arabic-speaking country. According to the original plan, events would have taken place in Trojena, a mountain tourism destination under construction in Neom. Trojena was expected to become the first major outdoor skiing destination in the Arabian Peninsula upon its originally scheduled completion in 2026. Trojena's ski village, as well as indoor venues for the ice sports, would have been used. The final program for the Games had not yet been decided, but it was expected for Neom to have at least 47 medal events. However, on 24 January 2026, the Olympic Council of Asia announced that the Games would be postponed to a later date which was to be announced in due course.

On 2 February 2026, the Olympic Council of Asia announced that the Games would be held in Almaty, Kazakhstan. The OCA and the government of Kazakhstan signed the hosting contract on 5 February in Milan, Italy, one day before the start of the 2026 Winter Olympics. Almaty previously hosted the 2011 Asian Winter Games with the capital Astana, the 2017 Winter Universiade by itself, as well as bidding for the 2022 Winter Olympics, which it lost to Beijing, China.

== Concerns and controversies ==
=== Selection of Neom as original host ===
Amidst increasing global-warming concerns, the selection of Neom as the host city of the Games raised multiple issues ranging from the high temperatures in the desert, the energy impacts and detour of local water resources to the construction of artificial ski slopes from scratch. Raphael Le Magoariec, a political scientist and specialist in the geopolitics of sports in the Persian Gulf region, said that Riyadh "mainly wants to promote Neom its city of the future." FIS secretary general Michel Vion expressed surprise at the decision of the Olympic Council of Asia, and Olympic downhill silver medalist Johan Clarey said, “it is awful for our sport."

==== Construction delays and withdrawal ====
On 22 August 2025, it was reported that Trojena was suffering from construction delays and increasing budget deficits, and may not have potentially been complete in time for the Games. Saudi officials had considered holding back hosting until 2033, once construction was complete. One of the contractors for Trojena, Eversendai Corporation Bhd, acknowledged that the company and its workers were under early-stage challenges, potentially leading to delays if not worked around. Despite this, the Olympic Council of Asia had stated that work was advancing "on schedule", and was "pleased with the strong progress being made", and was monitoring the "on-schedule work from the local organising committee".

Originally, if Trojena was not planned to be complete in time, the Olympic Council of Asia had contacted the Korean Sport & Olympic Committee of the possibility of replacing Neom as host of the Games. Gangwon Province in South Korea has previously hosted the 1999 Asian Winter Games, the 2018 Winter Olympics and the 2024 Winter Youth Olympics. The Chinese Ministry of Foreign Affairs had offered support, possibly indicating intent to replace Neom as host. Harbin in China hosted the most recent Asian Winter Games in 2025. Eventually, on 2 February 2026, the Olympic Council of Asia announced that Almaty would replace Neom as host.

== See also ==
Preceded by Harbin	Asian Winter Games; Almaty; X Asian Winter Games (2029)	Succeeded by To be determined
