= Alat (company) =

Tech manufacturing company based in Saudi Arabia

- Native name: آلات
- Type: Private
- Industry: Conglomerate
- Founded: 1 February 2024; 2 years ago
- Founder: Mohammed bin Salman
- Headquarters: Riyadh, Saudi Arabia
- Key people: Mohammed Bin Salman (Chairman); Muhammad Aldawood (Acting Chief executive officer)
- Products: Electrification; Consumer Electronics
- Owner: Public Investment Fund
- Website: alat.com/en/

Alat (styled ALAT; Arabic: آلات) is a conglomerate based in Saudi Arabia. The company, which is owned by the Saudi Public Investment Fund, was founded in February 2024 by Crown Prince Mohammed bin Salman. Alat manufacturing is building advanced manufacturing capabilities across four strategic sectors: AI & Digital Hardware, Building & Heavy Equipment, Electrification, and Home & Medical Equipment.

As part of Saudi Vision 2030 goals to diversify the Saudi economy, Alat aims to create 39,000 jobs, in addition to contributing $9.3 billion to the GDP by the year 2030.

== History ==
The company was officially launched by the Saudi Crown Prince Mohammed bin Salman on 1 February 2024 as one of the various companies founded by the Saudi Public Investment Fund to diversify Saudi Arabia's economy away from oil.

In February 2024, Alat announced partnership with Carrier Global, Dahua Technology, SoftBank Group, and Tahakom.

In February 2025, Alat and Lenovo broke ground on a new 200,000 square meter manufacturing hub located in Riyadh. The facility is expected to begin production in 2026.

== See also ==
- List of Saudi Vision 2030 Projects
- Saudi Vision 2030
- Public Investment Fund
