= Demolitions in Jeddah =

The demolitions in Jeddah are demolition works carried out by the Saudi government that began in October 2021 and is still ongoing. The government claims that its primary goal is to improve the city and get rid of old and illegally constructed homes in order to boost tourism. Some inhabitants publicly criticized the demolitions by the government, which restricts any opposition activities. Amnesty International said the demolition plan violated human rights and was discriminatory as it excluded foreign nationals, who make up 47 percent of the city's population. It further stated that eviction notices were given to residents in a variety of time frames, from one day in one neighborhood to between one and six weeks in others. As of January 2022, approximately one million people had been affected by the demolitions.

== See also ==
- Saudi Vision 2030
- Destruction of early Islamic heritage sites in Saudi Arabia
