= Jeddah Central =

Project to develop central Jeddah

- وسط جدة

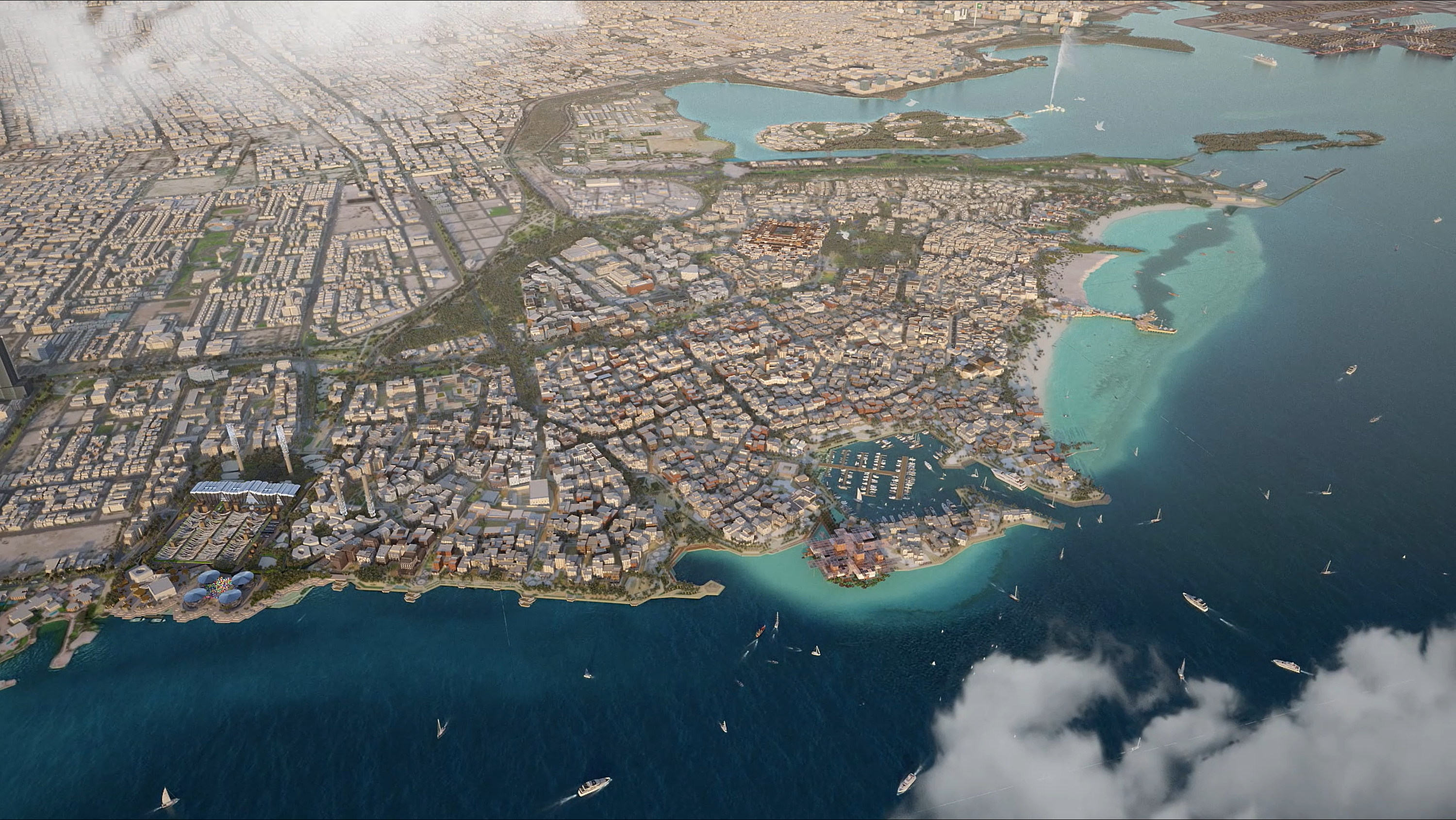
- Location: Jeddah, Saudi Arabia
- Owner: Public Investment Fund
- Founder: Mohammed bin Salman
- Key people: Mohammed bin Salman (Chairman); Ahmed Al Khateeb (Vice Chairman); Ahmed Al Sulaim (CEO)
- Established: 17 December 2021; 4 years ago
- Budget: $20 billion
- Website: www.jeddahcentral.com/en/

Jeddah Central (Arabic: وسط جدة) is a real-estate development project under construction in Jeddah, Saudi Arabia. Jeddah Central project is developed by Jeddah Central Development Company (JCDC), one of companies founded by the Saudi Public Investment Fund. The $20 billion project was officially announced by Crown Prince Mohammed bin Salman in December 2021. It will cover a total area of 5.7 km^{2}.

As part of Saudi Arabia's Vision 2030 to diversify the Saudi economy away from oil, JCDC says that the project will create 25,000 jobs and contribute more than $12.5 billion to Saudi Arabia's national GDP by the year 2030.

The project will go through 3 phases, with the first one set to be completed by the end of 2027. Upon completion, the project will include 2,700 hotel rooms and 17,000 residential units.

== Background ==
The first phase of development, which makes up 45% of the project, is planned to be completed by the end 2027. This phase includes the stadium, oceanarium, and the opera house.

The second phase which makes up 36% of the project, is expected to be completed by the year 2030. This phase includes the museum, the library, and the wellness district.

The final phase, which will be completed after 2030, constitutes the remaining 19% of the project. This phase includes the art village and the coral bay.

== History ==
Jeddah Central was officially announced by Crown Prince Mohammed bin Salman on 17 December 2021 as part of Vision 2030.

In February 2024, contracts worth $3.2 billion were awarded to construct the stadium, the opera house and the oceanarium. This includes the contract to implement the first phase of the infrastructure, which was awarded to China Harbour Engineering Company.

== Landmarks ==
=== Jeddah Central Stadium ===
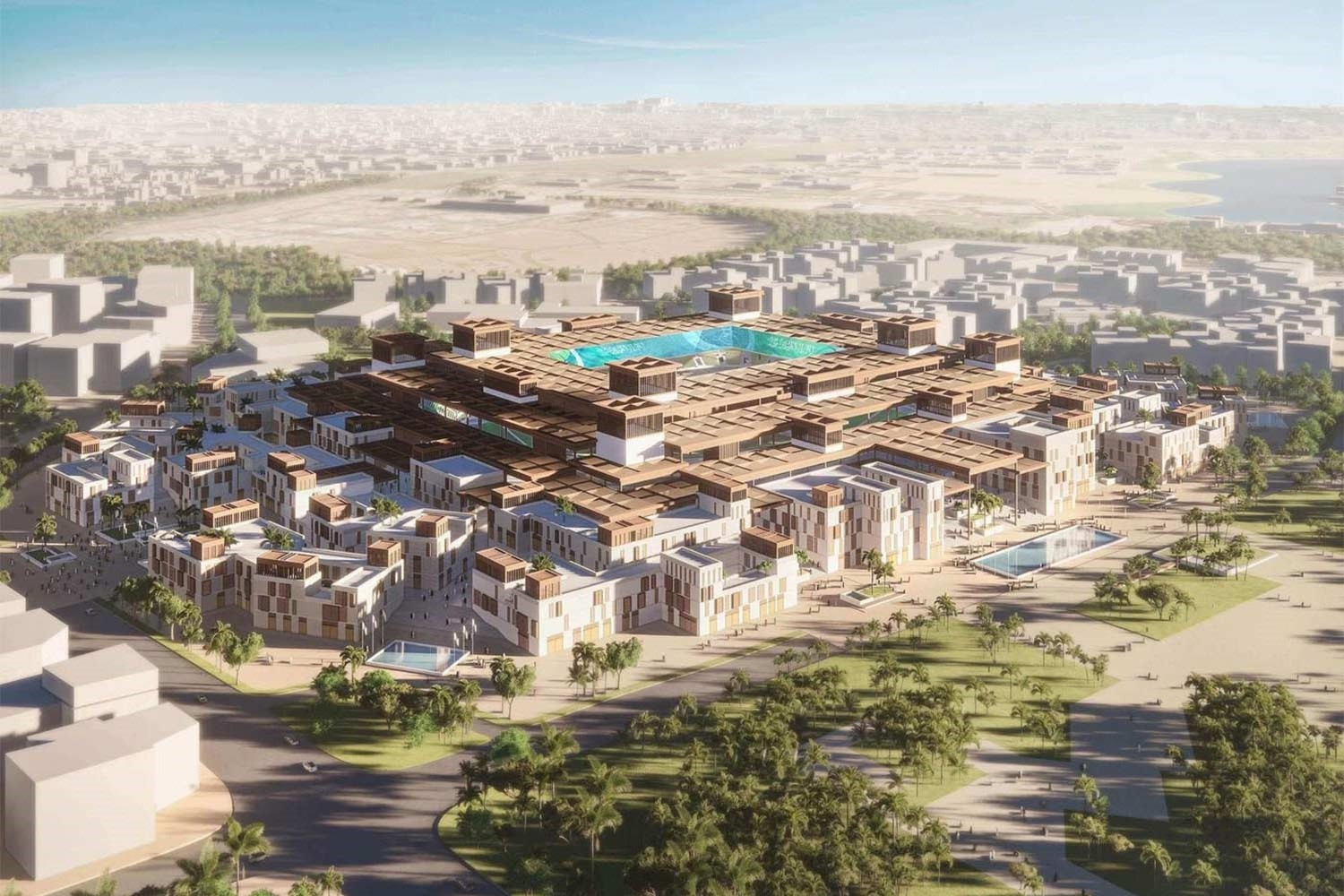
3D illustration of the Central Jeddah Stadium design

The Jeddah Central Development Stadium is one of the various stadiums announced by Saudi Arabia to host international football competitions. This is one of the stadiums set to host games of both the 2027 AFC Asian Cup and the 2034 FIFA World Cup. The stadium will have a capacity of 45,000 seats.

The stadium's design is inspired by the UNESCO world heritage site Al-Balad.

In July 2022, JCDC announced that the stadium will be designed by GMP and urban development consultants Khatib and Alami.

In January 2024, the contract to construct the stadium was awarded to Beijing-based China Railway Construction Corporation and SAMA contracting. The construction began in February of the same year. The stadium is expected to be inaugurated in 2026.

=== Opera House ===
The Opera House is designed by Copenhagen-based Henning Larsen Architects, with the construction being awarded to Modern Building Leaders (MBL).

=== Oceanarium and Coral Farm ===
The Oceanarium and Coral Farm are designed by US-based Skidmore, Owings & Merrill (SOM) and will feature underwater exhibits. The construction contract was awarded to Modern Building Leaders (MBL).

=== Museum ===
The museum will transform a desalination plant into an industrial museum that will introduce the industrial heritage of Jeddah and illustrate the process of desalination. The museum is designed by London-based Heatherwick Studio. The museum will start welcoming visitors by the year 2028.

== Criticism ==
The areas proposed for the Jeddah Central project are allegedly being cleared by the authorities without fair compensation for its residents. In June 2022, Amnesty International reported that "the demolitions affect more than 558,000 residents" and that they verified 20 neighborhoods being demolished using satellite imagery and videos.

== See also ==
- List of Saudi Vision 2030 Projects
- Saudi Vision 2030
- Masar Destination
- Neom
- Al-Balad, Jeddah
