= Al Balad Development Company =

Company based in Saudi Arabia

- Native name: شركة تطوير البلد
- Type: Privately held company
- Industry: Hospitality; Tourism
- Founded: 3 October 2023; 2 years ago
- Founder: Public Investment Fund
- Headquarters: Jeddah, Saudi Arabia
- Key people: Badr bin Abdullah (Chairman); Hamed Fayez (Vice-Chairman); Jamil Ghaznawi (CEO)
- Owner: Public Investment Fund
- Subsidiaries: Al Balad Hospitality
- Website: balad.com.sa/en/

Al Balad Development Company (BDC; Arabic: شركة تطوير البلد) is a hospitality and tourism company based in Jeddah, Saudi Arabia. The company was founded in October 2023 by the Public Investment Fund as part of Saudi Vision 2030. BDC aims to transform Al Balad Historic District into a global tourist destination.

== History ==
BDC was officially launched by the Public Investment Fund on 3 October 2023 as part of Saudi Vision 2030 plan to diversify the Saudi Economy away from oil.

In May 2024, Jeddah Historic District Program announced the restoration of 3 historical houses, which are the Jokhdar House, Al-Rayyis House, and Kedwan House, and turning them into luxury hotels. The restoration was supervised by the ministry of culture, which assigned Al Balad Development Company to manage the hotels.

== See also ==
- Saudi Vision 2030
- List of World Heritage Sites in Saudi Arabia
- List of Saudi Vision 2030 Projects
- Jeddah Central Development Company
- Soudah Development Company
- Al-Ula Development Company
