= Quality of Life Program (Saudi Arabia) =

Saudi Arabian government program

- Formation: 2018
- Type: Governmental program
- Affiliations: Saudi Vision 2030
- Budget: $34.6 billion
- Website: vision2030.gov.sa

The Quality of Life Program (QOLP) is a Saudi Arabian Government initiative aiming to increase recreational facilities and boost tourism as part of the Saudi Vision 2030 Development Programs.

== History ==
The Quality of Life Program was launched in 2018, aiming to improve the tourism and entertainment infrastructure in Saudi Arabia. As a result of the initiative, the first cinema in the country was opened, with plans for 55 more cinemas in the coming years. By March 2020, the program had issued more than 400,000 tourist visas, which followed a growing travel interest in the country.

In 2020, QOLP-supported events attracted 46 million visitors, with affiliated entertainment companies creating more than 101,000 jobs. The QOLP also established the Tourism Development Fund, funding 67 tourism projects with 160 million Saudi riyals.

The program also includes a Hobbies Sector initiative designed to promote recreational activities and the development of related facilities. As part of this effort, the Hobby Clubs Association (Hawi) was established, with its bylaws approved. The association, which is supported by 11 government agencies, is responsible for the establishment, organization, and registration of hobby clubs across Saudi Arabia. Additionally, the initiative aims to foster a culture of leisure and engagement throughout the entire country.

== Indexes ==
QOLP evaluates program performance by referring to multiple indices, including:

- The Economist Intelligence Unit's Global Liveability Ranking
- Mercer Quality of Life Index
- Monocle Magazine Quality of Life Survey
- UN World Happiness Report
- OECD Better Life Index
- AARP Livability Index
