= Masar Destination =

Urban Development Project in Mecca

- وجهة مسار

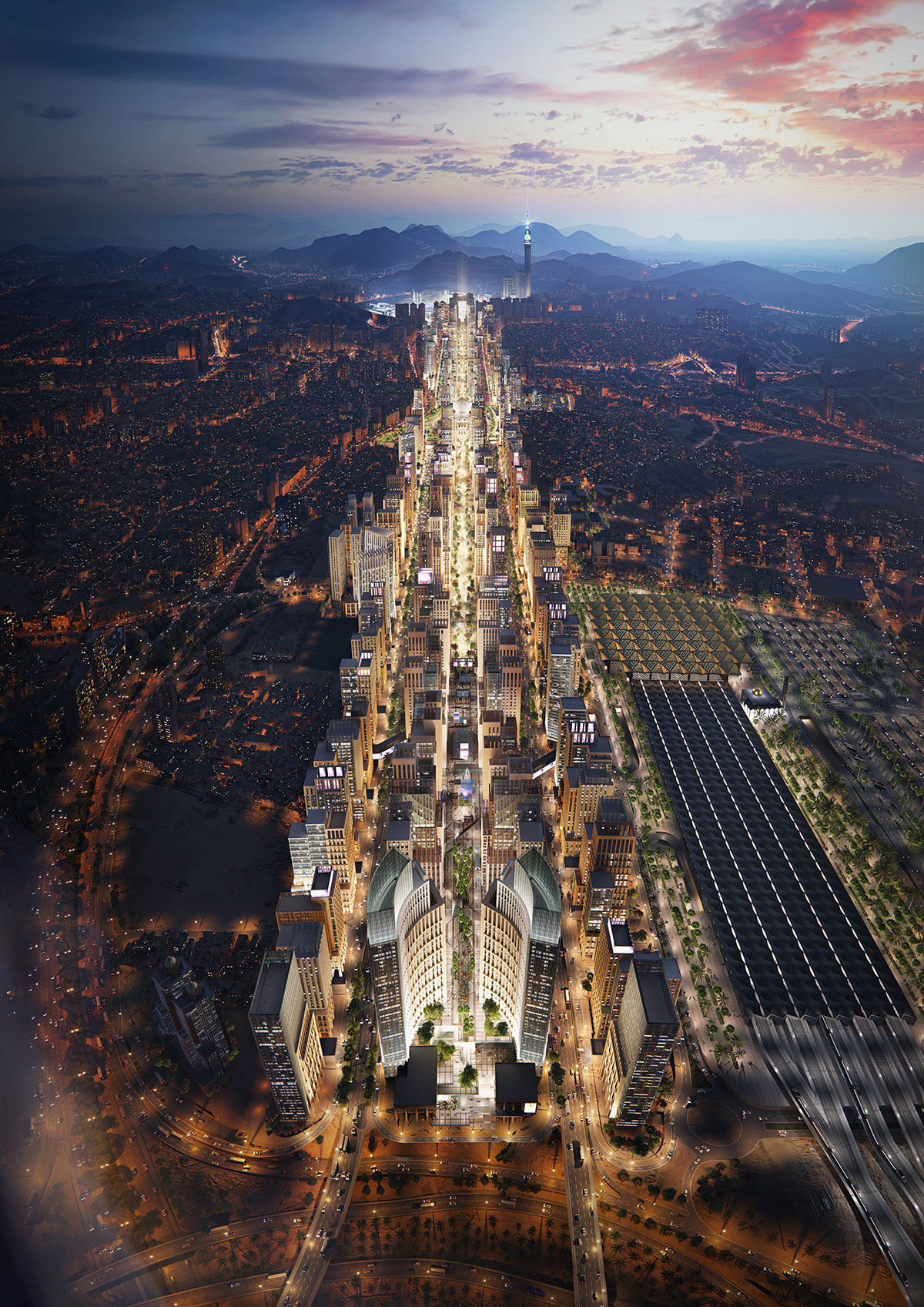
- Location: Mecca, Saudi Arabia
- Owner: Public Investment Fund
- Founder: Salman bin Abdulaziz
- Key people: Yasser Abuateek (CEO)
- Established: 28 June 2020; 6 years ago
- Budget: $26.67 billion
- Website: www.masardestination.com/en

Masar Destination (Arabic: وجهة مسار, romanized: Wejhāt Māsar), simply known as Masar, is a mixed-use real estate development project under construction in Mecca, Saudi Arabia. The Masar Destination project is developed by Umm Alqura for Development and Construction (UAQ), one of the companies owned by the Saudi Public Investment Fund. The project was officially announced by UAQ in June 2020. Masar will be 3.65 km long and 300 m wide, leading to the Masjid al-Haram.

Masar will contribute to Saudi Arabia's Vision 2030 objective to increase the capacity to host pilgrims to 30 million by the year 2030. In addition, it is intended to diversify the Saudi economy away from oil by creating 16,000 jobs.

== History ==
Masar, which means “path” in Arabic, was officially announced by Umm Alqura for Development and Construction Company on 28 June 2020 as part of Vision 2030.

The destination is designed by architecture firms One Works and RMJM.

In October 2022, Masar Destination closed a $2 billion deal to construct 7 towers including 1,300 hotel rooms in the Future Investment Initiative. According to the CEO, the project will include 24,000 hotel rooms and 13,000 residential units by the time of completion. In addition, it will host 158,000 visitors annually.

== See also ==
- List of Saudi Vision 2030 Projects
- Saudi Vision 2030
- Rua Al Madinah
- Jeddah Central
- Neom
