= The Rig, Saudi Arabia =

Planned offshore tourist attraction

The Rig ذا ريغ (Arabic)
- Adventure Tourism Destination
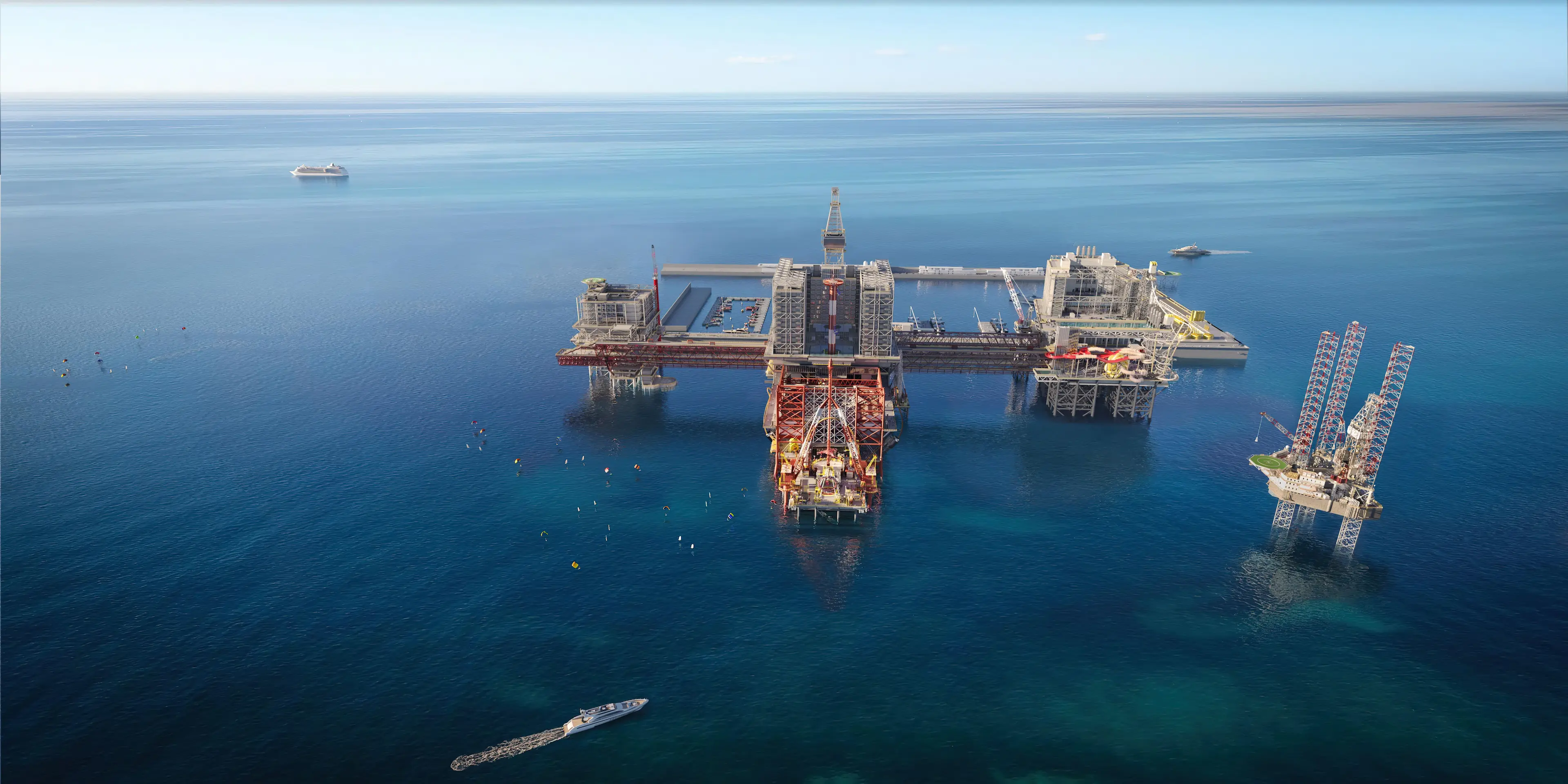

- Location within Saudi Arabia
- Coordinates: 27°11′37.2984″N 49°48′11.4408″E
- Country: Saudi Arabia
- Province: Eastern Province
- Body of Water: Persian Gulf
- Announced: 16 October 2021; 4 years ago
- Founder: Public Investment Fund

Government
  - CEO: Raed N. Bakhrji

Area
  - Total: 0.3 km^{2} (0.12 sq mi)
- Time zone: UTC+03:00 (Arabian Standard Time)
- Website: therig.sa

The Rig (stylized THE RIG.; Arabic: ذا ريغ) is a theme park under construction in Saudi Arabia, 40 km from the coastline of the Persian Gulf. The project will be designed after an offshore oil Platform and will cover over 300,000 m^{2}, double what was originally announced in 2021. The Rig aims to attract more than 900,000 domestic and international tourists by the year 2032.

A 2022 report published by Upstream estimated that the project will cost around $5 billion.

== See also ==
- List of Saudi Vision 2030 Projects
- Saudi Vision 2030
- Public Investment Fund
