= Christopher Bauder =

German interaction designer and media artist (born 1973)

Christopher Bauder (born 1973) is a German artist focused on large-scale art installations and lighting designs. He is based in Berlin. His projects focus on the translation of bits and bytes into objects and environments and vice versa. Space, object, sound, light, and interaction are the key elements of his work.

== Biography ==
Born 1973 in Stuttgart, Bauder started creating large-scale spatial art installations and lighting design after finishing his studies in the Digital Media Class at the Berlin University of the Arts. His projects focus on the translation of bits and bytes into objects and environments and vice versa. Space, object, sound, light, and interaction are the key elements of his work. In 2004, he founded the multidisciplinary art and design studio WHITEvoid as a necessity to realize his large scale art and design pieces and environments. The studio is composed of specialists in interaction design, media design, product design, interior architecture, and electronic engineering.

He is best known for his city-wide light art installation Lichtgrenze, created in 2014 together with his brother Marc, for the 25th anniversary of the Fall of the Berlin Wall.

== Work ==
Christopher Bauder has brought his installations and performances to events and spaces around the world, including the Centre Pompidou in Paris, The National Museum of Fine Arts in Taiwan, Museum of Design in Zurich, CTM and Transmediale in Berlin, MUTEK in Montreal and Mexico City, The Festival of Lights in Lyon and other countless festivals. In December 2023, his seven-minute laser light show opened the Noor Riyadh light and art festival, with laser beams in a "Dialogue" between Al Faisaliah Tower and Kingdom Centre.

His projects have received worldwide recognition and have won several awards including the German Lighting Design Award, the Design Award of the Federal Republic of Germany, the Cannes Lions, the Red Dot Design Award and the iF Communication Design Award.
