= King Salman Energy Park =

Industrial megaproject in Saudi Arabia

King Salman Energy Park (SPARK)
- Native name: مدينة الملك سلمان للطاقة
- Founded: 5 December 2018; 7 years ago
- Headquarters: Kingdom of Saudi Arabia
- Services: Industrial, exploration, production, refining, petrochemicals, conventional power, water production and treatment services
- Owner: Saudi Aramco; Saudi Authority for Industrial Cities and Technology Zones
- Website: http://www.spark.sa

King Salman Energy Park (known as SPARK) (Arabic: مدينة الملك سلمان للطاقة) is a new megaproject being constructed and located between Dammam and Al-Ahsa in the Eastern Province of Saudi Arabia. This project is being developed, operated and managed by Saudi Aramco.

The project will be constructed through three phases occupying 50 square kilometers and situated near industrial areas and highway and railway networks.

== Services and products ==
SPARK aims at providing different services and products including exploration, production, refining, petrochemicals, conventional power, water production and treatment, and drilling. Furthermore, it is expected by completing the project by 2035 to create 100,000 direct and indirect jobs in addition to an annual increase in GDP by $6 billion.

== SPARK regions ==
By the completion of the first phase in 2021, SPARK will be divided into five main regions.

- Industrial zone: this region consists of five different areas focusing on services and products of refining, exploration and production.
- Dry port and logistics zone: provides Modern logistics services with an annual capacity of 8 million tons of cargo.
- Business district: this includes Saudi Aramco's Drilling and Workover Headquarters
- Training centers: this region contains industrial training institutes and centers
- Residential compounds and commercial activities: this region consists of compounds, hotels, schools, health centers entertainment center

== See also ==
- List of Saudi Vision 2030 Projects
