= Al-Khafji solar desalination plant =

Solar-powered seawater desalination plant in Saudi Arabia

The Al-Khafji Solar Desalination Plant is a seawater reverse-osmosis (SWRO) facility located near Al-Khafji in the Eastern Province of Saudi Arabia. It is described in governmental and technical publications as one of the earliest large-scale desalination plants intended to operate primarily using solar photovoltaic (PV) power. The project was developed under the King Abdullah Initiative for Solar Water Desalination, led by the King Abdulaziz City for Science and Technology (KACST).

== Development ==
The King Abdullah Initiative for Solar Water Desalination was launched in 2010 with the aim of integrating renewable-energy technologies into national desalination processes. The Al-Khafji project became the initiative's first large-scale implementation. In 2015, Advanced Water Technology (AWT) and Abengoa began construction of the desalination plant and its 10-MW solar PV field. Development took place between 2016 and 2018 using KACST-manufactured PV modules.

== Technology ==
The facility is powered by a 10-MW solar photovoltaic field located approximately 9 km away, with modules designed by KACST to tolerate high temperatures, dust exposure, and strong solar radiation. It operates in a hybrid configuration that relies on solar electricity during daylight hours and draws power from the national grid at night or during periods of low solar availability. The desalination process employs a seawater reverse osmosis system with ultrafiltration pretreatment to enhance membrane efficiency and limit fouling. This is followed by a two-stage reverse osmosis sequence supported by energy recovery devices and completed with post-treatment steps such as remineralization and pH adjustment. The plant has a designed production capacity of about 60,000 to 90,000 m^{3} per day.

== Capacity and operation ==
According to Vision 2030 project materials, the Al-Khafji Solar Desalination Plant can supply drinking water for roughly 100,000 residents. Solar PV provides daytime electricity, while the grid ensures continuous 24-hour operation.

== Environmental impact ==
Reports from KACST and Fanack Water indicate that solar-powered desalination can reduce fossil-fuel consumption and lower greenhouse-gas emissions associated with water production. Solar generation displaces electricity that may otherwise come from oil or gas-fired power plants.
