= Public Investment Fund =

Sovereign wealth fund of Saudi Arabia

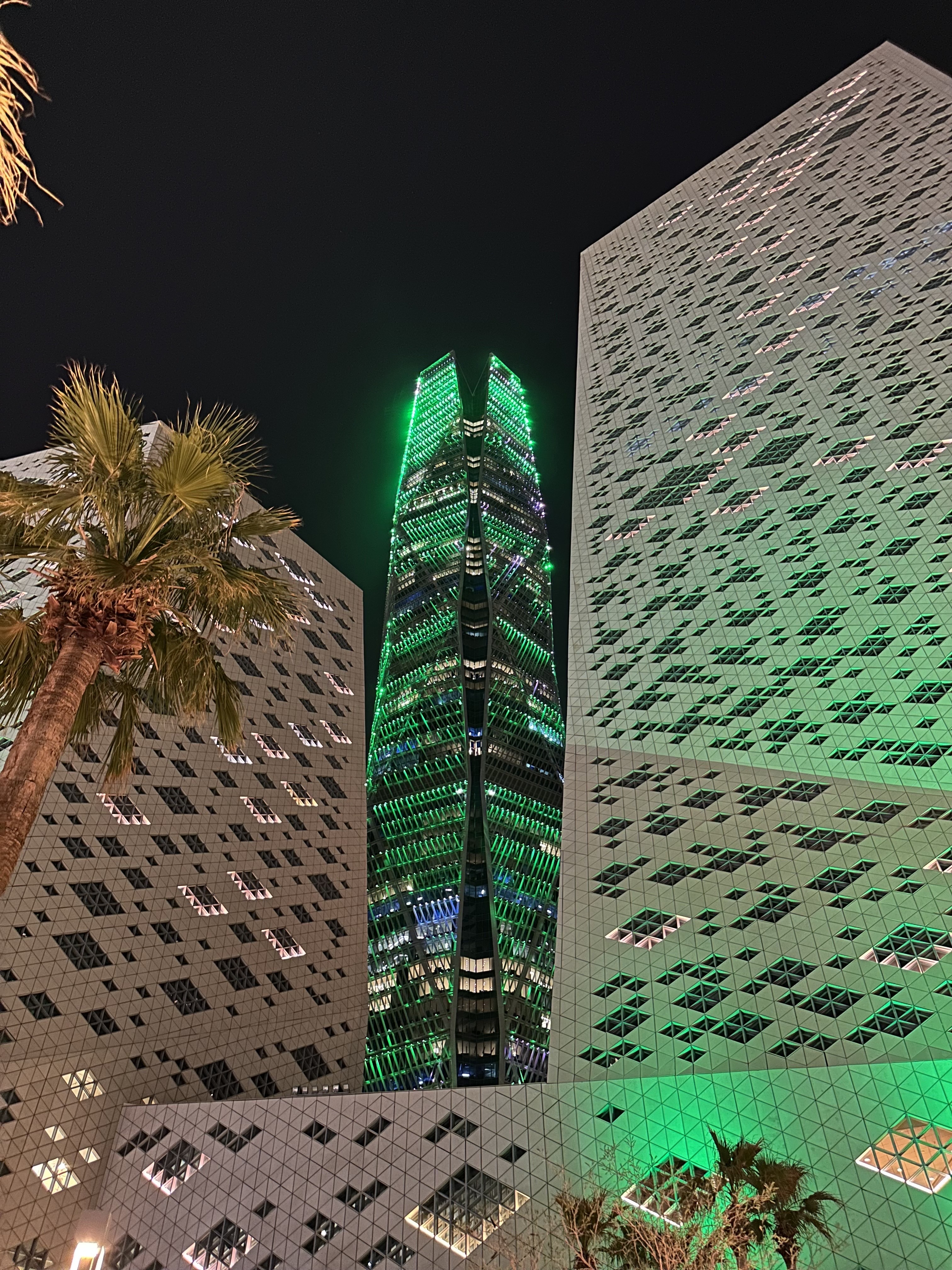
- Headquarters at Public Investment Fund Tower
- Native name: صندوق الإستثمارات العامة
- Founded: 17 August 1971; 55 years ago
- Founder: Faisal bin Abdulaziz
- Headquarters: Public Investment Fund Tower, Riyadh, Saudi Arabia
- Key people: Mohammed bin Salman, Chairman; Yasir Al-Rumayyan, Governor
- Revenue: ▲$120 billion (2025)
- Net income: ▲$17 billion (2025)
- AUM: US$900 billion (May 2026)
- Owner: Government of Saudi Arabia
- Website: pif.gov.sa

The Public Investment Fund (PIF; Arabic: صندوق الاستثمارات العامة) is the sovereign wealth fund of Saudi Arabia. It is among the largest sovereign wealth funds in the world with total estimated assets of US$900 billion. It was created in 1971 for the purpose of investing funds on behalf of the government of Saudi Arabia. The wealth fund has Crown Prince Mohammed bin Salman, Saudi Arabia's de facto ruler since 2015, as its chairman.

More than 60% of the fund's activities are within Saudi Arabia. Within Saudi Arabia, the fund's investments primarily go to private conglomerates owned by prominent Saudi business families who have close ties to the Saudi ruling family. Outside of Saudi Arabia, the fund's investments into prominent foreign assets, such as Premier League football club Newcastle United, the boxing promotion Zuffa Boxing, and video game company Electronic Arts, have generated controversy due to the fund's lack of transparency and close control by the Saudi government, which has itself faced significant criticism around the lack of human rights in the country.

== History ==
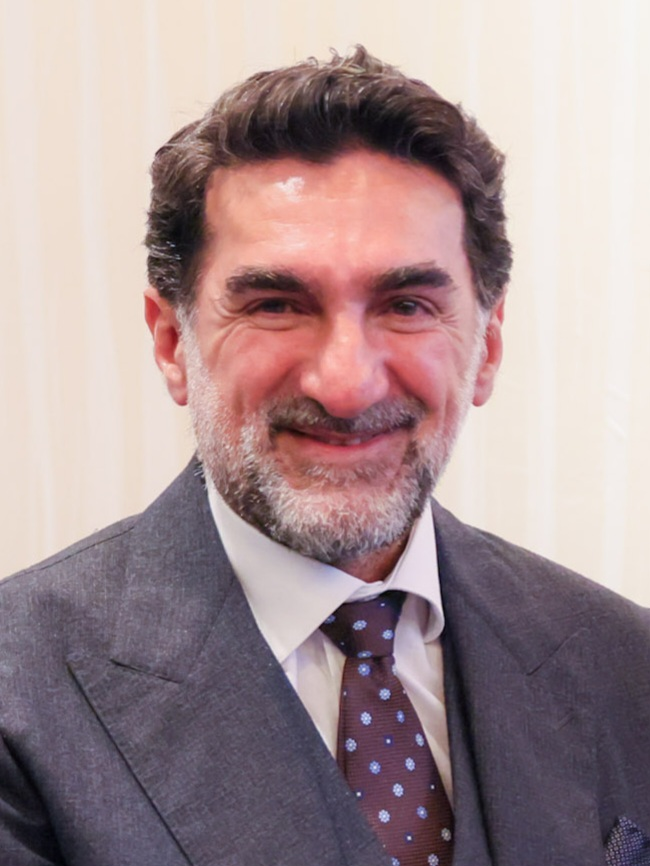
PIF governor Yasir Al-Rumayyan at the FII PRIORITY Asia Summit in Tokyo, 2025

The Saudi Arabian Public Investment Fund (PIF) was established by King Faisal bin Abdulaziz Al Saud in 1971 by Royal Decree M/24 with the stated intent to provide financing support for projects of strategic significance to the national economy. For much of its history, the PIF was a passive entity that oversaw the Saudi state's equity in listed firms. When neighboring petrostates began using their sovereign wealth funds for influence, Saudi Arabia followed them. The PIF expanded its staff from 50 in 2015 to nearly 500 in 2018.

In July 2014, the Council of Ministers granted the PIF authority to fund new companies inside and outside the Kingdom, independently or in cooperation with the public and private sectors, without the council's prior approval. In March 2015, oversight of PIF was moved from the Ministry of Finance to the Council of Economic and Development Affairs (CEDA). As part of this process, a new PIF was appointed, chaired by Crown Prince Mohammed bin Salman. The board says PIF is aligned with the government's Vision 2030 with the aim to diversify the economy. To bolster the resources of the PIF and help in the financing of investments into foreign companies such as Uber and Tesla, the PIF received cash from the Saudi Central Bank, issued debt, and benefitted from the proceeds of the privatisation of Saudi state assets.

In 2022, a 4% stake in ownership of Saudi Aramco was transferred to the PIF, which was repeated in 2023 as part of the fund's plan to increase assets under management to over $1 trillion by 2025. The shares for the second 4% stake in 2023 were valued at around $78 billion. The move was intended to take advantage of higher hydrocarbon prices to fund the expansion of the PIF in its overarching goal to diversify investments.

A 2021 report by Global SWF found that PIF's Governance, Sustainability, and Resilience (GSR) score had risen by 12% to an overall score of 40% (out of 100%) that year. This was partially attributed to the fact that PIF had started to build a dedicated ESG (Environmental, Social, and Sustainability) team. The fund achieved an annual return of around 8% between 2018 and 2022.

== Investment projects ==
The Public Investment Fund (PIF) holds a wide range of domestic and international investments. These include a 38% stake in POSCO Engineering & Construction, a 5% stake in Uber acquired for $3.5 billion, and combined 5% stakes in the video game companies Capcom and Nexon, purchased for approximately $1 billion.

In March 2016, the Saudi government announced that ownership of Saudi Aramco would be transferred to the PIF, and that the Kingdom planned to list 5% of Aramco's shares in an initial public offering by 2017.

Domestically, PIF owns and develops several large-scale projects. These include Qiddiya City, leadership of the Red Sea Project, and ownership of the closed joint-stock company Neom.

PIF also holds a 5.7% stake, valued at about $500 million, in concert and ticketing company Live Nation. In 2020, the fund purchased minority stakes in several major U.S. companies, including Boeing, Meta Platforms (then known as Facebook), and Citigroup.

That same year, PIF disclosed investments of approximately $713.7 million in Boeing, $522 million in Citigroup, $522 million in Facebook, $495.8 million in The Walt Disney Company, and $487.6 million in Bank of America. It also reported a small stake in Berkshire Hathaway and an $827.7 million stake in oil company BP.

In addition, PIF acquired a 2.32% stake, valued at $1.5 billion, in India's Jio Platforms in 2020. Later that year, the fund reduced its total U.S. equity holdings from $10.1 billion to $7 billion in the third quarter, leaving its then $2.7 billion stake in Uber as its largest remaining U.S. investment.

In 2016, SoftBank Group and the PIF announced that they would establish the SoftBank Vision Fund, which aimed to invest up to $45 billion over five years in the tech sector. The SoftBank Group confirmed that during the fiscal year 2019–2020, the Vision Fund incurred a loss calculated at $17.7 billion after the value of investments was written down. The losses were related to the investments in WeWork and Uber. In the 39-year history of SoftBank, the Saudi Arabia-backed funds paid the group its worst-ever losses; the overall company losses were 1.36 trillion yen (more than $12.5 billion).

During the 2017 Saudi–US CEO Forum, which was part of President Donald Trump's official trip to Saudi Arabia, PIF announced plans to "invest $40 billion in infrastructure projects, mostly in the U.S." Blackstone Inc., whose CEO and founder, Stephen A. Schwarzman, is a top supporter of Trump, entered into a non-binding memorandum by which the PIF committed $20 billion to the project. During the CEO Forum, US–Saudi arms deals were announced, including a pledge to "assemble 150 Lockheed Martin Black Hawk helicopters" in Saudi Arabia, representing 450 jobs in Saudi Arabia as part of the "$6 billion deal for Black Hawks."

In October 2017, it was announced that PIF would aim to increase its assets under management to more than $400 billion and create more than 20,000 new jobs by 2020. Al-Rumayyan presented a new investment strategy for the fund, based on four objectives of maximizing assets, investing in new sectors, localizing technologies, and developing economic partnerships. He also said PIF would borrow conservatively to finance specific assets and would seek further partnerships such as those with Blackstone, Inc. and SoftBank.

In September 2018, Al-Rumayyan announced PIF's first step in incorporating loans and debt instruments into its long-term strategy, with an $11 billion loan facility. The following month, he said the fund would aim to increase the percentage of international assets in its portfolio from 10% to 50% by 2030.

At the Milken Institute in Abu Dhabi in February 2019, Al-Rumayyan announced that PIF would open new offices in London, New York City, and San Francisco and would increase its workforce from 450 to 700 by the end of 2019. He also said the fund would invest in renewable energy projects in Saudi Arabia, including local manufacturing of solar panels.

In 2021, it purchased stakes in the American video game companies Electronic Arts, Take-Two Interactive, and Activision Blizzard. In May 2022, it purchased a 5% stake in the Japanese video game company Nintendo, and the following month, an 8% stake in Embracer Group with a $1 billion investment.

PIF held an indirect stake in Twitter before its acquisition by Elon Musk.

In November 2023, PIF acquired a 10% stake in Heathrow Airport after Ferrovial sold its 25% share. The remaining 15% was acquired by Ardian. Subsequently, on 15 December 2024, it was reported that Ardian and PIF had successfully acquired 22.6% and 15%, respectively, of stakes in Heathrow Airport for a combined US$4.12 billion from Ferrovial and some shareholders in FGP TopCo.

PIF acquired a 49% stake in Rocco Forte Hotels in December 2023, valuing the hotel group at £1.4 billion.

In 2024, PIF acquired a 38% share of HOLON GmbH, Germany. HOLON is a subcompany of Benteler International. HOLON is launching the world's first electric autonomous shuttle with automotive standards in 2026.

=== Former Donald Trump administration officials ===
In 2021, PIF invested $2 billion into Affinity Partners, a private equity firm formed by Jared Kushner, Donald Trump's son-in-law, shortly after he left the White House, where he had worked during his father-in-law's first term as president. While considering making the $2bn pledge, PIF officials and advisers raised questions about the merits of the investment, but PIF management overruled the advisers. Even a year later, in April 2022, Affinity Partners primarily depended on Saudi money: it had some $2.5 billion under its management by that stage. Within the Trump administration, Kushner worked extensively on Arab–Israeli diplomatic issues, and had been a staunch defender of Saudi ruler Mohammed bin Salman. According to ethics experts, the $2bn investment, which would boost the fund's yield and generate substantial management fees for Affinity and, consequently, for Kushner personally, created the appearance of potential payback for Kushner.

In 2021, PIF invested $1 billion in the investment fund established by former Treasury Secretary Steven Mnuchin just after he left that position.

In May 2022, it was reported that Affinity Partners was planning to direct its investments—and thus Saudi Arabia's PIF money—to Israel. Kushner conducted various pitch meetings with a range of Israeli startups before selecting two of them in which Affinity would invest. The Kingdom did not have formal diplomatic relations with Israel and was not a part of the public Abraham Accords process at that stage. Kushner warned Saudi Arabian officials that it could lose opportunities in Israel to its neighbors who signed the Accords, including the United Arab Emirates and Bahrain. Saudi officials agreed to Affinity Partners' investment in Israeli startups, which was also believed to have been approved by Crown Prince Mohammed bin Salman. Many saw it as groundwork for the potential normalization of Israel–Saudi Arabia relations. It was the first known occasion in which money from the Saudi PIF would go to Israel.

=== Takeover of Newcastle United ===
On 14 April 2020, a £300 million agreement was reached for the sale of Newcastle United F.C. from owner Mike Ashley to a consortium comprising the PIF, PCP Capital Partners, and the Reuben Brothers. The Premier League did not approve the deal, leading Ashley to pursue legal action in an attempt to finalize the sale. On 7 October 2021, the consortium, led by the PIF, completed the acquisition after the Premier League received "legally binding assurances" that the Saudi government would not control the club.

The Premier League faced criticism from human rights organizations following the club's sale. Amnesty International condemned the decision, citing Saudi Arabia's human rights record and calling for ownership rules that would prevent human rights violators from owning Premier League clubs. The organization described the takeover as "an extremely bitter blow for human rights defenders." Hatice Cengiz, fiancée of murdered journalist Jamal Khashoggi, also urged the Premier League to block the deal.

In April 2021, Crown Prince Mohammed bin Salman reportedly urged UK Prime Minister Boris Johnson to influence the Premier League's decision on the proposed takeover, warning of potential economic consequences if it was blocked. This occurred amid a proposed Saudi investment of $30 billion in the UK over ten years. Amnesty International UK described the takeover as "a blatant example of Saudi sportswashing". The UK government declined to release details of its discussions with the Premier League, citing potential harm to diplomatic relations with Saudi Arabia. The other 19 Premier League clubs criticized the takeover, arguing it harmed the league's reputation.

=== Establishment of LIV Golf ===
In October 2021, a division of the PIF, Golf Saudi, funded the establishment of LIV Golf Investments, with Greg Norman declared its CEO. The private company introduced a professional tour, LIV Golf, known beforehand as the Super Golf League. It came as a new challenge against the PGA Tour, along with the World Golf Tour and the Premier Golf League.

LIV Golf's strategy differed from other leagues as it offered the richest golf tournaments in history and was able to convince star players to take part. In June 2022, the LIV Golf Invitational Series commenced its eight-event season, with total prize money of $255 million. The Saudi PIF backed the event with $2 billion in funds. LIV Golf offered the winner's prize of each regular event $4 million in prize money, in comparison to the PGA Championship's $2.7 million. Some of the most prominent professional golf players participated in the event, including Phil Mickelson, Dustin Johnson, Graeme McDowell, Sergio García, Martin Kaymer, Louis Oosthuizen, Charl Schwartzel, and Lee Westwood. Dustin Johnson was allegedly paid $150 million to join the Saudi-backed series. Phil Mickelson also committed to the series after signing a $200 million contract. However, some other renowned players also rejected the new league, with Tiger Woods turning down an offer worth nearly $1 billion. A vocal critic of the tournament, Rory McIlroy, also stood with PGA Tour and criticized players who joined LIV, stating they were "taking the easy way out".

LIV Golf was also condemned as another sportswashing tool of Saudi Arabia, which is accused of several human rights violations, including the assassination of Jamal Khashoggi. Norman and several participating players were questioned by reporters about their association with a Saudi-funded tour. Norman dismissed the questions, saying, "We've all made mistakes" and that Saudi wanted "to move forward".

Phil Mickelson gave a controversial statement before the establishment of the circuit, saying that the Saudis were "scary motherf–kers to be involved with". He said, "We know they killed Khashoggi and have a horrible record on human rights". Despite that, Mickelson joined LIV Golf, calling it "a once-in-a-lifetime opportunity" to reshape the PGA Tour. Graeme McDowell also gave similar answers and said, "We're not politicians, we're professional golfers. If Saudi Arabia wants to use the game of golf as a way for them to get to where they want to be, I think we're proud to help them on that journey."

On June 6, 2023, it was announced that LIV Golf and the PGA Tour would merge their commercial businesses into a new for-profit company, with the Public Investment Fund reportedly investing billions into the new company. Critics of the deal accused the PGA of hypocrisy and lamented what they saw as Saudi "sportswashing." Saudi exiles and human rights activists said that the PGA was accepting "Saudi blood money." The Associated Press wrote that the merger of the PGA Tour and LIV Golf marked a turnaround for the authoritarian regime in Saudi Arabia, as the Mohammed bin Salman regime had been isolated for years over human rights abuses and the murder of Jamal Khashoggi.

In April 2026, PIF announced in its new five year strategy that it is reevaluating its priorities. This is against mounting pressures and financial commitments to host World Expo 2030 and the football world cup in 2034.

=== Exposure to Credit Suisse crisis ===
In 2022, PIF made a $1.5 billion investment in Credit Suisse as part of a broader goal of diversifying its portfolio into global banking. The PIF connected Credit Suisse to the Saudi National Bank, and made the Saudi National Bank the largest shareholder with less than 10% ownership (which, according to the Saudi National Bank, prevented them from having to deal with regulatory requirements for 10%+ shareholder ownership). After the March 2023 United States bank failures had gripped the global banking sector, Saudi National Bank chairman Ammar al-Khudair publicly stated on 15 March 2023 that they would "absolutely not" supply Credit Suisse with more capital (referencing the regulatory requirements for 10%+ shareholders as the reason why), which then promptly caused the share price of Credit Suisse to drop 25% more. On 19 March 2023, UBS confirmed their planned acquisition of Credit Suisse.

=== ATP and WTA tour partnerships ===
In 2024, the Public Investment Fund announced partnerships with the ATP and WTA tours. In March 2024, PIF announced a $2 billion offer to buy both professional tennis tours, the ATP Tour and the WTA Tour which would not have involved grand slam events and would have involved the two tours being merged into a single PIF-led tour. It is unclear if the offer was later rejected or accepted.

== List of investments ==
The following lists contain all the investments of the PIF as of May 2025:

=== Giga-projects ===
Investment	Sector
Neom	Real estate
Red Sea Global	Real estate
Qiddiya City	Real estate
Roshn	Real estate
Diriyah Company	Real estate

=== International ===
Entertainment

- Electronic Arts (93.4%)
- Skydance (15.1%)
- LIV Golf
- Take-Two Interactive (6.1%)
- SURJ Sports Investment (100%)
  - ATP Media (minority)
  - DAZN (minority)
  - Kings League (partnership)
  - Newcastle United Football Club (85%)
  - Professional Fighters League (minority)
  - Professional Triathletes Organisation (minority)
  - Radia (partnership with Live Nation and Oak View Group)

Financial

- Arab Bank Switzerland
- Blackstone (partnership)
- Russian Direct Investment Fund (partnership)
- SoftBank Group (partnership)

Transportation

- Heathrow Airport Holdings (15%)
- Lucid Motors (58%)
- Uber (minority)

Information technology

- Humain (100%)
- Jio Platforms (2.3%)
- Magic Leap (minority)

Other

- Accor (hospitaility)
- Reliance Retail (2%)
- Minerva Foods (food; 34%)

=== Middle East and North Africa ===
Investment	Sector
Alat	Construction and Building; Components and Services
Dan Company	Real estate
Ceer Motors	Automotive
Sawani	Consumer Goods; Retail
Dur Hospitality Company	Entertainment; Leisure and Sports
Saudi Real Estate Company	Real estate
GDC	Aerospace and Defence
Electric Vehicle Infrastructure Company (EVIQ)	Automotive
Gulf Lab Electric Equipment Testing Company	Utilities and Renewables
JASARA Program Management Company	Construction and Building; Components and Services
Ma'aden	Metals and Mining
Marafiq	Utilities and Renewables
Qassim Cement Company	Construction and Building; Components and Services
Riyad Bank	Financial services
SAPTCO	Transport and Logistics
Arcelormittal Tubular Products Al-Jubail Co.	Metals and Mining
Arabian Industrial Fibers Company (Ibn Rushd)	Diversified
Dussur	Diversified
Saudi Electricity Company	Utilities and Renewables
STC	Telecom; Media and Technology
Tadawul Real Estate Company	Local Investments
Taiba Investments Company	Real estate
ACWA Power	Utilities and Renewables
Alinma Bank	Financial services
Bahri	Transport and Logistics
Eastern Province Cement	Construction and Building; Components and Services
Saudi Ceramics	Construction and Building; Components and Services
Southern Province Cement	Construction and Building; Components and Services
Taqa	Petroleum Industry and Renewables
Noon	Consumer Goods; Retail
Bidaya Home Finance Company	Financial services
Saudi Global Ports Company (Singapore)	Transport and Logistics
Sela	Entertainment; Leisure and Sports
Umm Al Qura Construction & Development Company	Real estate
Yanbu Cement	Construction and Building; Components and Services
Gulf International Bank	Financial services
Saudi Real Estate Refinancing Company	Financial services
The Saudi Jordanian Investment Fund	Diversified
ASMA Capital	MENA Investments
Americana Group	Consumer Goods; Retail
The Saudi National Bank	Financial services
Saudi Company for Artificial Intelligence	Telecom; Media and Technology
Boutique Group	Real estate
The Rig	Real estate
Saudi Downtown Company	Real estate
Saudi Facilities Management Company	Real estate
TASARU Mobility Investments	Real estate
Soudah Development Company	Real estate
Amaala	Real estate
Elm Company	Telecom; Media and Technology
Jada	Financial services
KAFD	Real estate
National Water Company	Utilities and Renewables
Nupco	Healthcare
Rua Al Madinah Holding Company	Real estate
National Security Services Company	Diversified
Salic	Consumer Goods; Retail
Saudi Arabian Military Industries	Aerospace and Defence
Sanabil Investments	Financial services
Saudi Railway Company	Real estate
Saudi Tadawul Group	Financial services
SIRC	Utilities and Renewables
Saudi Information Technology Company (SITE)	Telecom; Media and Technology
Tahakom Investments Company	Financial services
TAQNIA	Telecom; Media and Technology
Tarshid	Utilities and Renewables
The Helicopter Company	Aerospace and Defence
Water and Electricity Holding Company (WEHC)	Utilities and Renewables
Arab Bank (Amman)	Financial Services
Cruise Saudi	Entertainment; Leisure and Sports
Saudi Entertainment Ventures (Seven)	Entertainment; Leisure and Sports
Jeddah Central Development Company	Real estate
Saudi Coffee Company	Consumer Goods; Retail
Riyadh Air	Airline
D360 Bank	Financial services
Savvy Games Group	Entertainment; Esports
Halal Products Development Company	Food and Agriculture
Badael Company	Healthcare
Al-Ula Development Company	Real estate
Center for Governance	Diversified
Al Balad Development Company	Hospitality
New Murabba	Real estate
Ardara	Real estate
Avilease	Aircraft Leasing
QSAS	Entertainment
SARRC	Real Estate
Esports World Cup; Esports Foundation	Esports

== Criticism ==
PIF has been characterized as among the least transparent sovereign wealth funds in the world. In 2016, The Wall Street Journal noted that none of the fund's investments were named. According to Steffen Hertog, a professor at the London School of Economics, the PIF "is seen as opaque, a black box. Few know what's going on there, including sometimes other government ministries." As the PIF is a ministry-operated company with an overwhelming focus on domestic investments, some scholars characterize it as a "quasi-sovereign wealth fund." The fund's investments within the kingdom include dates, camels, and coffee, but also amusement, sports, tourism and renewable energy.

In March 2019, it was revealed that PIF paid a New York communications firm, Karv Communications, $120,000 a month to repair the Saudis' damaged reputation after the assassination of Jamal Khashoggi.

The governance structure of PIF has been called into question, specifically with respect to how much control Mohammad bin Salman wields over investment choices and broader decision making at PIF. In October 2022, Yasir Al-Rumayyan (the governor of PIF) gave an interview where he spoke about resisting the ambitious purchases of international stocks advocated by Mohammad bin Salman at the beginning of 2020 as the world was grappling with COVID-19. The concern was that giving the PIF tens of billions of dollars from the Saudi central bank to fund this stock buying was risky, and might devalue the local currency. Although Mohammad bin Salman is the chairman of PIF, PIF has denied "any suggestion that the decision-making or conduct of the board of PIF is unduly influenced (or influenced in any way contrary to the principles of good governance) by the crown prince." Yasir Al-Rumayyan claims he was overruled by King Salman of Saudi Arabia, who is still officially head of the Saudi state as king. Yasir Al-Rumayyan also admitted that the $35 billion spent by the PIF on stocks soon rose to $49 billion when markets rose.

The fund's domestic investments tend to go to firms owned by elites with long-standing personal connections to the Saudi state.

Some of PIF's assets were transferred to the organization in 2017 after the Saudi regime conducted an "anti-corruption" purge whereby assets of 400 of Saudi Arabia's richest people were seized by the regime.

== See also ==
- Economy of Saudi Arabia
- MiSK Foundation – Saudi Arabian non-profit foundation
- National Development Fund – Saudi government development fund
- Saudi Vision 2030 – Strategic framework in Saudi Arabia
