= New Murabba =

Planned downtown in Riyadh, Saudi Arabia

New Murabba المربع الجديد
- Neighbourhood
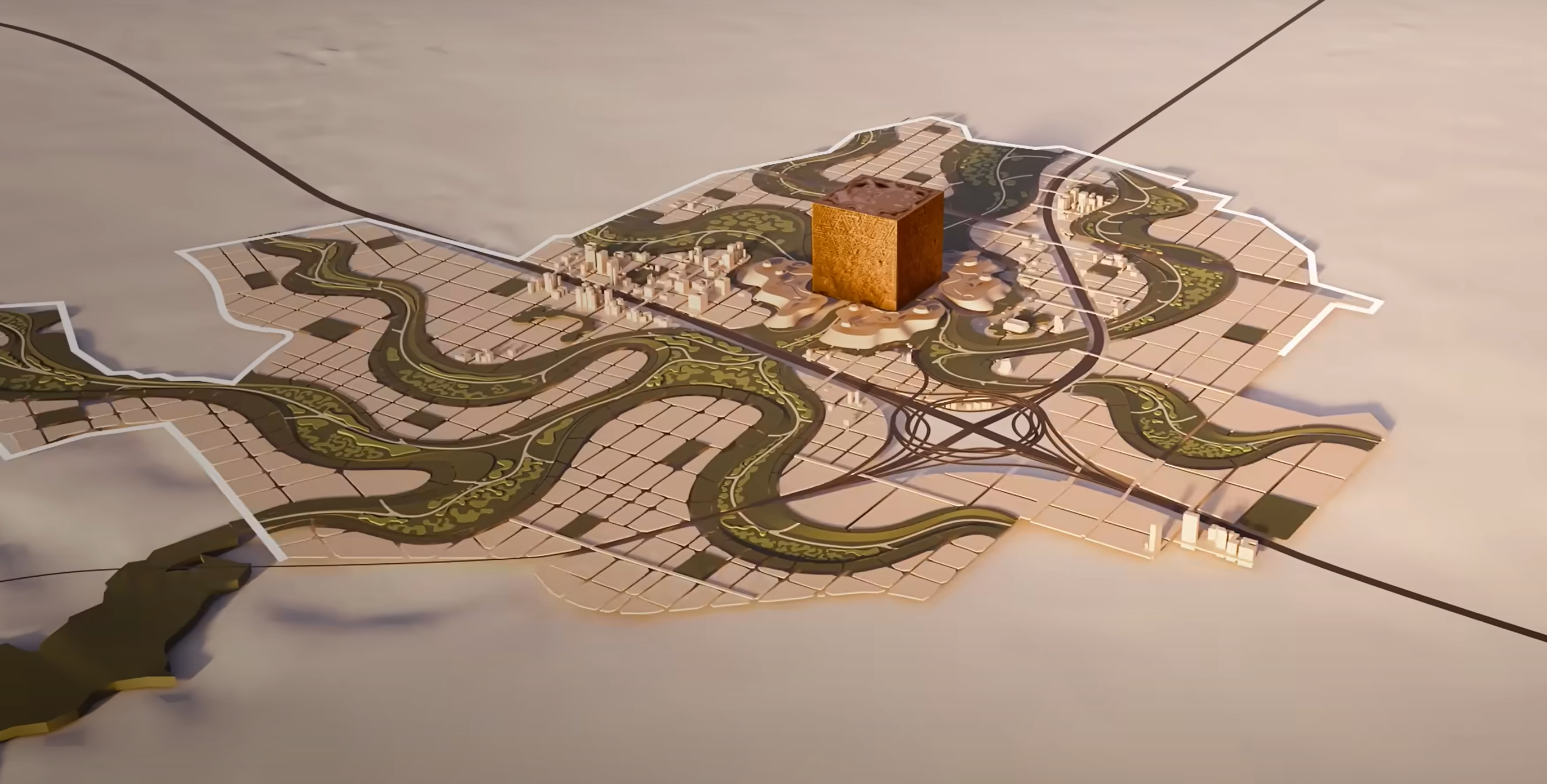

- Interactive map of New Murabba
- Location within Saudi Arabia Location within Asia
- Coordinates: 24°48′33.7″N 46°33′51.8″E
- Country: Saudi Arabia
- City: Riyadh
- Established: 16 February 2023
- Founder: Mohammed bin Salman
- Named for: Al Murabba

Area
  - Total: 14.1 km^{2} (5.4 sq mi)

Language
  - Official: Arabic
- Website: newmurabba.com/en/

New Murabba (Arabic: المربع الجديد, romanized: al-Murabbaʿ al-Jadīd, lit. 'The New Murabba') is a mixed-use real estate development under construction in northwestern Riyadh and easternmost Diriyah, Saudi Arabia. It was announced in February 2023 by Saudi crown prince Mohammed bin Salman as Riyadh's new modern downtown along with The Mukaab, planned as a 400-meter tall cuboid skyscraper within the development.

It is named after the Riyadh's al-Murabba district whereas its flagship architectural project, the Mukaab, is modeled after the cuboidal layout of the Murabba Palace.

As of 2026, reporting indicated that the development had been suspended, while the Public Investment Fund reassessed the project's financing and feasibility.

== History ==
=== Announcement ===
The New Murabba project was announced on 16 February 2023 by Mohammed bin Salman, Crown Prince and Prime Minister of Saudi Arabia, who simultaneously unveiled the Mukaab and announced the establishment of the New Murabba, a master developer subsidiary owned by the Public Investment Fund.

=== Planning and Construction Progress ===
In August 2023, Bechtel was appointed as program management consultant for the masterplan and infrastructure scope. In September 2023, Turner Arabia was named program management consultant for the Mukaab. In October 2023, China Harbour Engineering Company was awarded the earthworks and excavation contract for the site. In December 2023, following a design competition, AtkinsRéalis was appointed as masterplanner and lead designer for the Mukaab. Around the same period, AECOM was appointed as program management consultant for buildings across the wider development.

By October 2024, excavation at the Mukaab site was reported as approximately 86% complete, with HSSG Foundation Contracting subsequently commencing piling works.

In 2025, a series of appointments and partnerships were announced. In June, Naver Cloud signed a memorandum of understanding covering smart city technologies, including robotics, autonomous vehicles, and digital construction monitoring.In July, Arup was named lead designer for the New Murabba Stadium.

In January 2026, Parsons was appointed as infrastructure lead design consultant for the development.

== Key Components (Planned) ==
=== The Mukaab ===
The Mukaab is a planned 400-metre cuboid structure designed as the centerpiece of New Murabba. Official announcements described it is intended to accommodate cultural, commercial, and entertainment components.

=== Residential and Mixed-Use Development ===
The masterplan includes residential, commercial, hospitality, retail, leisure, and community facilities across the wider development.

=== Cultural and Educational Facilities ===
The downtown will also include a museum, a technology and design university, a multipurpose immersive theater, and more than 80 entertainment and cultural venues.

== Concept and Design ==
=== Masterplan ===
AtkinsRéalis was appointed as masterplanner for the 14-square-kilometre site. The masterplan is structured around the principle of walkability, incorporating a ‘15-minute city’ concept designed so that residents can reach key services, amenities, and employment within a 15-minute walk or cycle.

=== Sustainability & Technology Integration ===
According to the Saudi Press Agency, the downtown will be built around the concept of sustainability, featuring green areas and walking and cycling paths promoting healthy, active lifestyles and community activities like eco-friendly zones and walking and cycling paths.

The development’s technology planning includes proposed smart city systems, such as robotics, autonomous vehicles, smart city platforms and digital construction monitoring. Its urban-design planning also includes architectural overlays and public-realm features, with emphasis on anchor assets, linear parks, and smart city features.

== See also ==
- List of Saudi Vision 2030 Projects
- Murabba Palace
