= Prince Mohammed Ibn Salman Road (Riyadh) =

Road in Riyadh, Saudi Arabia

Prince Mohammed Ibn Salman Ibn Abdul Aziz Road (Arabic: طريق الأمير محمد بن سلمان بن عبد العزيز), formerly Prince Saud bin Muhammad bin Muqrin Road (Arabic: طريق الأمير سعود بن محمد بن مقرن), is a 30 km commercial road in northern Riyadh, Saudi Arabia that runs from the Hittin neighborhood to al-Rimal neighborhood and links King Khalid Road from the west and al-Janadriyah Road to the east. It was renamed after Mohammed bin Salman, the crown prince of Saudi Arabia through a royal decree issued by King Salman in March 2019.
