= Ceer Motors =

Saudi electric vehicle company

Ceer National Automotive Company
- Logo
- Native name: سير
- Type: Private
- Industry: Automotive
- Founded: 2 November 2022; 4 years ago
- Founder: Mohammed bin Salman
- Key people: James DeLuca (CEO)
- Owner: Public Investment Fund
- Website: ceermotors.com

Ceer Motors is a Saudi Arabian electric vehicle brand that makes sedans and SUVs for the GCC region. Ceer Motors plans to manufacture seven different models by 2030. The name "Ceer" means "drive forward" in Arabic.

== History ==
Ceer Motors was formed through a partnership between the Saudi Public Investment Fund and the Taiwanese electronics contract manufacturer Foxconn in 2022. Saudi Arabia's sovereign wealth fund is projected to partner with Apple Inc. to build a $9 billion facility that manufactures microchips, electric-vehicle components, and other electronics. The joint venture is part of an effort to diversify the kingdom's economy away from being entirely oil-dependent, in line with Saudi Vision 2030.

Ceer Motors will license component technology from BMW to use in the electric vehicle development process. Foxconn will develop the electrical architecture of the products.

In June 2024, a contract worth $2.2 billion was signed between Ceer and Hyundai Transys, through which the Korean company will supply Ceer vehicles with integrated electric vehicle drive systems.

== Investments ==
Ceer Motors is projected to contribute directly with over $150 million of foreign investment to the kingdom and create up to 35,000 direct and indirect job opportunities. By 2034, Ceer Motors is expected to contribute $8 billion to Saudi Arabia's GDP. In February 2026, Ceer signed 16 agreements worth 3.7 billion Saudi riyals to support the localization of electric vehicle manufacturing in the nation.

== See also ==
- List of Saudi Vision 2030 Projects
