= Prince Mohammed bin Salman Project for the Development of Historical Mosques =

Public initiative in Saudi Arabia to restore the country's historic mosques

- مشروع الأمير محمد بن سلمان لتطوير المساجد التاريخية
- Founder: Mohammed bin Salman
- Ministry: Ministry of Tourism; Ministry of Islamic Affairs
- Launched: 12 November 2018; 7 years ago
- Website: Mohammed bin Salman Project for Developing Historical Mosques

The Prince Mohammed bin Salman Project for the Development of Historical Mosques (Arabic: مشروع الأمير محمد بن سلمان لتطوير المساجد التاريخية) is an initiative by the Government of Saudi Arabia to restore derelict and dilapidated mosques across the country that particularly belong to early Islamic and medieval periods. Named after its eponymous founder, Crown Prince Mohammed bin Salman, the project was officially announced in November 2018 and is part of the Saudi Vision 2030. The initiative is jointly overseen and implemented by the Ministry of Tourism and the Ministry of Islamic Affairs, Dawah, and Guidance.

The Saudi Press Agency announced the project and its first phase on November 12, 2018. During the first phase, the project successfully oversaw the restoration of 30 mosques across the country with a budget of 50 million riyals.

On July 12, 2022, the government unveiled the second phase of the project which aimed to renovate 130 historical mosques in Saudi Arabia.
