= Humain =

Saudi artificial intelligence company

- Industry: Artificial intelligence
- Founded: 12 May 2025
- Founder: Mohammed bin Salman
- Headquarters: Riyadh, Saudi Arabia
- Area served: Saudi Arabia, Middle East, Global markets
- Key people: Tareq Amin (CEO)
- Products: AI infrastructure, Multimodal Arabic LLM
- Services: Data centers, Cloud AI services, AI model development
- Owner: Public Investment Fund (51%); Saudi Aramco (49%)
- Parent: Public Investment Fund; Saudi Aramco
- Website: humain.ai

Humain is a Saudi artificial intelligence company established under the Public Investment Fund to drive the kingdom's AI strategy.

== History ==
In May 2025, Humain was launched by Mohammed bin Salman, Crown Prince of Saudi Arabia. It aims to position Saudi Arabia as a global leader in AI innovation and infrastructure. Its founding was announced during an investment forum in Riyadh. That year, Humain secured partnerships with American technology companies Nvidia, AMD, and Qualcomm.

Humain has stated plans to develop several gigawatts of capacity. Humain's flagship model is ALLAM, an Arabic-first multimodal large language model. The ALLaM 34B version was reportedly trained on more than 500 billion Arabic tokens. Consumer and enterprise products include Humain Chat, a free Arabic-first chat application for iOS, Android, and web powered by ALLaM.
