= King Abdullah Gardens =

Botanical garden complex in Riyadh, Saudi Arabia

- KAGA
- حدائق الملك عبد الله
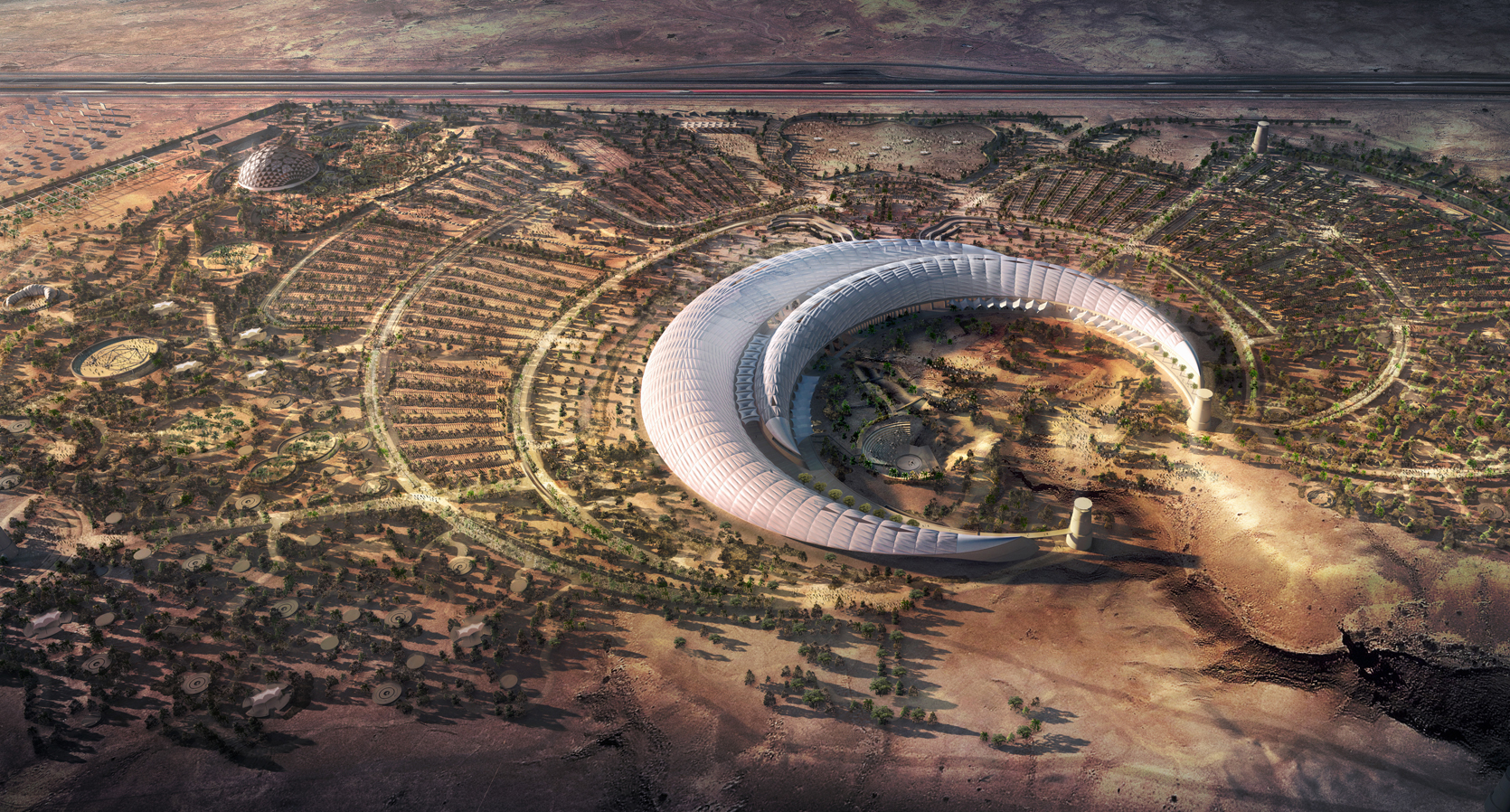
- Concept of the completed project
- Interactive map of King Abdullah Gardens
- Type: Botanical Garden
- Location: Riyadh, Saudi Arabia
- Coordinates: 24°32′N 46°28′E
- Area: 210 hectares (520 acres)
- Created: Zaid Al-Hussein & Brothers Group
- Owner: Riyadh Municipality
- Operator: Riyadh Municipality
- Status: Under Construction (56% completed)
- Website: www.kaig.net

King Abdullah Gardens (KAGA) (Note: Arabic: حدائق الملك عبد الله, romanized: ḥadāʾiq al-malik ʿAbd Allāh), is a unique and ecologically sensitive botanical garden located in Riyadh, the capital of Saudi Arabia. The project is designed to focus on mankind's understanding of the process, consequence, and study of climate change.

== History ==
The project was officially announced in 2014. Originally known as King Abdullah International Gardens (KAIG), the project was later renamed King Abdullah Gardens (KAGA). The gardens are named in honor of the late King Abdullah of Saudi Arabia. Located in Riyadh, the initiative aims to serve as a major educational resource, focusing on climate awareness and sustainable development.

logo used before the rename

The project features two interconnected, crescent-shaped biomes representing the site's progression through time. One of these, known as the Garden of Choices, is designed to depict possible future outcomes depending on whether climate change is mitigated or allowed to continue. The gardens are planned to be among the largest temperature-controlled botanical environments in the world.

The project was later added to the List of Saudi Vision 2030 projects.

By 1 April 2023, more than 40% of the project's operations had been completed.

== Contractor ==
The contract for the implementation of the 210-ha King Abdullah Gardens project was awarded to Zaid Al-Hussein & Brothers Group. The contract, worth $427.4 million (1.6bn SAR), was awarded by Saudi Arabia's Ministry of Municipalities and Housing.

== See also ==
- List of Saudi Vision 2030 projects
- Biosphere 2, another closed-loop ecosystem project
