= Saudi Vision 2030 =

Strategic framework in Saudi Arabia

- رؤية السعودية 2030
- Official logo

Development program overview
- Formed: 25 April 2016; 10 years ago
- Type: Development program
- Jurisdiction: Government of Saudi Arabia
- Motto: Saudi Arabia, the heart of the Arab and Islamic worlds, the investment powerhouse, and the hub connecting three continents
- Minister responsible: Mohammad bin Salman, Crown Prince of Saudi Arabia
- Key document: Saudi Vision 2030 English Arabic
- Website: vision2030.gov.sa

Saudi Vision 2030, (Note: Arabic: رؤية السعودية ۲۰۳۰, romanized: Ruʾyat al-Suʿūdiyyah ʿIšrīn/ʾAlfān wa Ṯalāṯīn) sometimes called Project 2030 or Saudi Vision, is a government initiative launched on 25 April 2016 by the Saudi government and Crown Prince Mohammed bin Salman to diversify Saudi Arabia's economy, society, and culture. The project aims to improve fiscal management and reduce the country's economic dependence on oil.

By 2026, multiple ambitious megaprojects associated with Saudi Vision 2030 had been watered down, put on hold or abandoned, most notably the failed $500 billion Neom megaproject. As of 2022, Saudi Arabia's economy remains heavily dependent on oil revenue. Oil accounted for approximately 40% of Saudi GDP and 75% of its fiscal revenue.

The Saudi Vision 2030 program faces strong criticism on various fronts, including its environmental impact, treatment of workers, and the forced evictions of over half a million people. Reportedly, over 21,000 workers have died on the job in program-related projects between 2017 and 2024, according to a 2024 investigation.

== Overview ==
Vision 2030 was announced shortly after Bin Salman took power in Saudi Arabia. According to Andrew Leber, the initiative was intended to promote Bin Salman's image abroad at the same time that he was consolidating power into his own hands.

Oil accounts for 43% of Saudi Arabia's real GDP. The contribution of oil revenue to Saudi GDP varies each year due to fluctuations in oil prices, but averages at 40% in the years prior to 2022. Oil accounts for an average of 75% of fiscal revenue.

Decreasing this dependence on oil resources has been one of the goals of the government since the 1970s. Oil and other natural wealth in countries that depend on these resources as a major source of income have been described as the "resource curse". However, the implementation of this goal has been unstable and remains largely dependent on the price of oil. The core priority is to be able to develop alternative sources of revenue for the government, such as taxes, fees, and income from the sovereign wealth fund. Another major aspect is to lower the dependency of the country's citizens on public spending by spending on subsidies, higher salaries, and increasing the portion of the economy contributed by the private sector to provide more employment opportunities. The goals in Saudi Vision 2030 could be compared with other development plans in the Middle East, such as Kuwait Vision 2035, Egypt Vision 2030 and UAE Vision 2021.

The plan is supervised by a group of people employed under the National Center for Performance Measurement, the Delivery Unit, and the Project Management Office of the Council of Economic and Development Affairs. The National Transformation Program was designed and launched in 2016 across 24 government bodies.

Saudi Vision 2030 has three pillars and three themes respectively, not to be confused with each other.

The vision has three main pillars:

1. to make the country the "heart of the Arab and Islamic worlds"
2. to become a global investment powerhouse, and to
3. transform the country's location into a hub connecting Afro-Eurasia.

Saudi Vision 2030 lays out targets for diversification and improving competitiveness. It is built around three main themes which set out specific objectives that are to be achieved by 2030:

1. A vibrant society – urbanism, culture and entertainment, sports, Umrah, UNESCO heritage sites, life expectancy
2. A thriving economy – employment, women in the workforce, international competitiveness, Public Investment Fund, foreign direct investment, non-oil exports
3. An ambitious nation – non-oil revenues, government effectiveness, e-government, household savings and income, non-profits, and volunteering.

== Projects and initiatives ==
The Public Investment Fund organizes an annual investment forum, the Future Investment Initiative, in Riyadh. However, amid the rising controversy and escalating tensions due to the Kingdom's alleged involvement in Jamal Khashoggi's murder, many international companies have backed out of the conference. Google Cloud, KKR, Ford Motor, JPMorgan Chase, BlackRock, Uber and Blackstone all withdrew their CEO/chairmen's names from the summit that was held on 23 October 2018. Major media houses including CNN, Bloomberg, CNBC, the New York Times, Fox Business Network, the Financial Times, the Los Angeles Times, and Huffington Post also withdrew as partners.

=== National Transformation Program ===
On 7 June 2016, the Council of Ministers approved the National Transformation Program which set out the goals and targets to be achieved by 2020. It is the first of three 5-year phases. Each phase will contribute towards achieving a number of goals and targets that put the Kingdom on track to reach the ultimate goals of Vision 2030. In addition, to assist the Kingdom in financing the projects to be developed and facilitate the process of achieving goals and targets, Crown Prince Mohammad bin Salman announced in January 2016 that an IPO of Saudi Aramco would take place. However, only 5% of the company will be made public.

In March 2019, Aramco released its financial statements, disclosing a net income of $111.1 billion in 2018. In June 2019, the Financial Times reported that Aramco is striving to separate its association with the Ministry of Investment, ahead of its potential listing. The company had been paying Ministry-related expenses, according to unnamed sources. The report revealed that Khalid Al-Falih had been using the company's revenues for his expenses, either directly relevant to Aramco or otherwise diplomatic. However, Falih's ally stated that his policies have brought in greater revenues for the firm.

The two massive tourism projects along the Red Sea planned by the Saudi government were to be run under the directorship of Richard Branson. On 11 October 2018, Branson stated that he is suspending his advisory role for the two projects amidst the Jamal Khashoggi murder. Branson also suspended talks with the Saudi government about investment in Virgin Galactic. He said he had "high hopes for the current government in the Kingdom and its leader Crown Prince Mohammed bin Salman…the disappearance of journalist Jamal Khashoggi, if proved true, would clearly change the ability of any of us in the West to do business with the Saudi Government."

=== Entertainment sector ===
In May 2016, a General Authority for Entertainment was announced by royal decree, into which over $2 billion has been invested. In Riyadh, the first public live music concert in over 25 years was held in May 2017, which featured American country musician Toby Keith and Saudi singer Rabeh Sager. In April 2017, the government announced a 334-square-kilometre (33,400 ha) sports, culture, and entertainment complex at Al-Qidiya, which lies to the south-west of Riyadh. The project includes a Six Flags Qiddiya City theme park, which opened in 2025.

As part of Vision 2030, there was a celebration of the 87th anniversary of the founding of Saudi Arabia, with concerts and performances. For the first time, women were allowed into Riyadh's King Fahd International Stadium.

On 5 March 2018, the General Sports Authority announced a 10-year partnership with American professional wrestling promoter World Wrestling Entertainment (WWE) to hold annual pay-per-view events in Saudi Arabia. The first event, Greatest Royal Rumble, was held on 27 April 2018 at King Abdullah Sports City in Jeddah. Due to restrictions on women's rights, WWE's female performers were not initially featured in these events. During Crown Jewel on 31 October 2019, Lacey Evans and Natalya participated in the first women's professional wrestling match in Saudi Arabia. In observation of conservative dress, they both wore black leggings and T-shirts over bodysuits instead of their normal ring attire.

Saudi Arabia lifted its 35-year moratorium on the construction of new movie theaters in the country, with the first new theater, owned by AMC Theatres, opening in April 2018 in Riyadh.

In 2019, a winter festival known as Riyadh Season was first held in support of Vision 2030, and included concerts and other entertainment events such as the MDLBeast "SoundStorm" electronic music festival, and the country's first official New Year's Eve event at Boulevard Riyadh City.

In January 2020, Saudi Arabia unveiled plans to build a new racing circuit in Qiddiya designed by former Formula One driver Alexander Wurz, aiming to host F1 or MotoGP events as early as 2023. In November 2020, it was announced that a circuit was being developed in Jeddah to host the inaugural Saudi Arabian Grand Prix in 2021.

=== Women's rights ===
In early 2017, Saudi state schools announced that they would be offering physical education classes to both boys and girls starting in the fall of 2017. Later that year, the state announced that they would allow women to attend sports events, including those inside sports stadiums. On 26 September 2017, a royal decree was issued granting women the right to drive vehicles which took effect in June 2018.

While changes to the law have been implemented for the welfare of women, some argue more progress still needs to be made. The case of Israa al-Ghomgham came to light after she and her husband were arrested in December 2015 for calling for the release of political prisoners and an end to anti-Shia government discrimination. Saudi prosecutors are seeking death penalty for Ghomgham. In 2019, the government-based web application Absher gained media attention and was criticized for tracking the movement of the women of the kingdom. The app, which promotes a male guardianship system, allows men to manage women's lives digitally by specifying where and when a woman can travel. The app also sends alerts to men's phones if a woman uses her passport at the border. The European Parliament and United States Congress condemned the app and urged the Kingdom to abolish its male guardianship system.

In August 2019, Saudi Arabia lifted travel restrictions on women and granted greater control to those above the age of 21.

As part of its plan to modernize, Saudi Arabia was adopting changes to enhance women's rights and gender equality. However, the country was being criticized, where human rights groups said that all its efforts "are not serious and fall within the whitewashing campaigns it is carrying out to improve its human rights record". It was after Saudi authorities detained a 34-year-old woman, Salma al-Shehab, and sentenced her to 34 years in prison. Shehab, a Ph.D. student of Leeds University, was in Saudi on vacation since the end of 2019. In January 2021, she was detained for her activity on Twitter, where she followed and retweeted activists and dissidents. She was sentenced to six years at the end of 2021, but the sentence was increased to 34 years after she appealed. The court also ruled for a subsequent 34-year travel ban, confiscation of her mobile phone, and for her Twitter account to be "closed down permanently". Shehab was reported on a Saudi-based crime-reporting app, Kollona Amn, or We Are All Security, by a user. Rights groups condemned Shehab's sentence, which they called evidence of Prince Mohammed's crackdown on dissent.

Female labor force participation in Saudi Arabia rose from 20% in 2014 to 31% by 2021 (reaching 37% by Q3 2022). This was mainly due to the both gender-specific policies (lifting the driving ban, anti-harassment laws) and gender-neutral fiscal pressures (VAT introduction, energy price reforms).

=== Tourism visa ===
To advance the Saudi Vision 2030, Saudi Arabia formally announced on 27 September 2019 the issuance of the tourist visa allowing visitors from 49 countries to visit the country up to 90 days for a fee of $80. The visa can be either obtained online (eVisa) or on arrival.

=== Other projects ===
Some of the other major projects to be developed are listed in the table below:

Major Saudi Vision 2030 Projects
Project	Location	Total Area (km^{2})	Announcement Date	Expected Completion	Cost	Website
NEOM, including The Line and Trojena	Tabuk	26,500	2017-10-24	2030	$500 billion	
Qiddiya City	South-west of Riyadh	360	2017-04-08	2030	$9.8 billion	
Red Sea Global, including The Red Sea Destination and Amaala	Tabuk	32,200	2017-07-31	2030 (first phase); 2035 (final phase)	$23.6 billion	
Roshn	Multiple Locations	200	2019-08-20	2026	$1.9 billion	
Diriyah Gate project	Diriyah	7.1	2017-07-20	2027	$63.2 billion	
New Murabba, including Mukaab	Riyadh	19	2023-02-16	2030	$50 billion	
Sports Boulevard	Riyadh	135	2019-05-19	2027	$23 billion	
Mohammed Bin Salman Nonprofit City	Riyadh	3.4	2021-11-14			
King Salman Park	Riyadh	16	2019-03-19	2027	$23 billion	
Expo 2030 Site	Riyadh	6.6	2023-11-28	2030	$7.8 billion	
Riyadh Metro	Riyadh		2012-04-23	2024	$22.5 billion	
King Abdullah International Gardens	Riyadh	2.5	2014-02-28	2025	$200 million	
King Salman Energy Park	Between Dammam and Al-Ahsa	50	2018-12-05	2021 (first phase)	$1.6 billion	
Jeddah Central	Jeddah	5.7	2021-12-17	2027 (first phase); 2030 (final phase)	$19.9 billion	
Jeddah Economic City	Jeddah	5.3	2011-08-01		$30 billion	
Masar Destination	Mecca	1.2	2020-06-28	2030	$26.66 billion	
Great Mosque of Mecca	Mecca	0.25	2017	mid-2018	$21.3 billion	
Rua Al Madinah, including Islamic Civilization Village	Medina	1.5	2022-08-24	2026 (first phase 2030 (final phase)	$37 billion	
Development of Historical Mosques	Multiple Locations		2018-11-12		$13.3 million	
The Rig	Persian Gulf	0.3	2021-10-16		$5 billion	
Al-Ula Vision	Al-Ula	22,500	2019-02-11	2027	$15 billion	
Soudah Peaks	Asir	627	2023-09-25	2029	$7.7 billion	
Al-Faisaliah project	West of Mecca	2,450	2017-07-26	2050		
Renewable Energy Projects	Multiple Locations		2018-03-27	2030	$200 billion	

== Implementation ==
=== Vision Realization Programs ===
To achieve the strategic goals and targets of Vision 2030, thirteen programs called Vision Realization Programs (VRPs) were established. The VRPs were presented by Council of Economic and Development Affairs (CEDA) on 24 April 2017:

1. Quality of Life Program
2. Financial Sector Development Program
3. Housing Program
4. Fiscal Balance Program
5. National Transformation Program
6. Public Investment Fund Program
7. Privatization Program
8. National Companies Promotion Program
9. National Industrial Development and Logistics Program
10. Strategic Partnerships Program
11. Hajj and Umrah Program: Digital pilgrimage services have been associated with the Hajj and Umrah Program. In 2022, Saudi Arabia launched Nusuk as a government platform for pilgrims and visitors travelling to Mecca and Medina as part of the Pilgrim Experience Program.
12. Human Capital Development Program
13. Saudi Character Enrichment Program

=== Supervision ===
The plan is supervised by Crown Prince and Prime Minister Mohammad bin Salman. Overall, Vision 2030's directions and decision-making roles lie within a Council of Ministers and a Council of Economic and Development Affairs (CEDA). CEDA's director, as well as the managers of the first 12 Vision Realization Programs, ensure proper adherence to the plan on the five-year level. Annually, each entity concerned is individually responsible for its budget and objectives.

=== Government entities reorganization ===
To achieve the strategic objectives of Vision 2030, new government entities were created, and existing entities were reorganized and/or merged.

New entity	Previous entity
Council of Economic and Development Affairs	
National Center for Performance Management	
Ministry of Culture	
General Authority for Entertainment	
Strategic Management Committee and Strategic Management Office	
Ministry of Commerce	Ministry of Commerce and Industry
Ministry of Investment	
Ministry of Human Resources and Social Development	Ministry of Labor and Social Affairs
Ministry of Energy	Ministry of Petroleum and Mineral Resources and
Ministry of Industry and Mineral Resources	Ministry of Petroleum and Mineral Resources and
Ministry of Environment, Water and Agriculture	Ministry of Water and Electricity and Ministry of Agriculture
Ministry of Hajj and Umrah	Ministry of Hajj
Public Education Evaluation Commission	Education Evaluation Commission

== Critical reactions ==
The IMF's report on Saudi Arabia a few months following the announcement of Vision 2030 explained that the fiscal deficit in the Saudi economy would continue to narrow in 2016. It also claimed that recent, major government deposits at the Saudi Arabian Monetary Authority (SAMA) acted as policy buffers to smooth the transition that the plan requires. In 2016, the IMF publicly warned that Saudi Arabia risks having no more foreign reserve currency within a 5-year period. In 2017, it projected that SAMA's net foreign assets would continue to decline, though remaining at a "comfortable level". It expects that the fiscal deficit will continue to improve over the coming years, also noting that non-performing loans remained low, despite a slight increase in 2017.

Over 300 specific targets for 2020 have been announced across 25 government entities as part of the National Transformation Plan (NTP). The NTP brings over 150 expected initial public offerings. However, reports noted the "key person dependency" on Crown Prince Mohammad bin Salman of the Vision and the NTP. Other criticisms have been regarding the lack of information about the detailed plans to accompany the intended transformation.

Certain journalists speculated that the plan's goals were overly ambitious, and noted that non-oil growth so far was insufficient and would threaten the plan's successful implementation. One report felt that despite the national plan's overall forward-thinking direction, "political reform appears to be absent from the policy agenda".

Reactions were mixed following the announcement that Saudi Arabia would lift the driving ban on women. Similarly to the overarching Vision 2030, some understood the announcement via royal decree as acquiescing to outside pressure, while others applauded the move.

According to a research paper written by Jane Kinninmont for Chatham House, the structural disadvantages of the country such as weak institutions, inefficient bureaucracy, and significant skill gaps between labor demands and the education system hinder the growth prospects of the country. Rebalancing the job market in the private sector will also prove to be a challenge since it is currently mostly staffed by expatriates. One of the difficulties is that the private sector has lower salaries and expats are easier to hire and fire. Currently, twice as many Saudi nationals work in the public sector as in the private sector. The challenge lies in getting a larger portion of nationals to accept lower-paying jobs with more hours than typical public jobs. The private sector must also be moved away from business activities that require very low-cost labor.

According to Hilal Khashan, from the U.S. conservative think tank Middle East Forum, to have the 2030 plan succeed ignoring the relationship between economic and political development is no longer a viable option, the developments required to increase the GDP as planned will encourage the breakage of the tribal system taking place. Another aspect is the "zero tolerance to corruption" that may be very difficult to achieve with a "society where family, tribal, and regional ties are stronger than the nebulous conception of state identity".

The hosting of sporting events in Saudi Arabia under the strategy have been described as attempts to sportswash the country's human rights record.

In June 2020, following the killing of Abdulraheem al-Huwaiti of Huwait tribe, Saudi Crown Prince Mohammed bin Salman, hired a US Public Relations and Communications firm Ruder Finn, to counter the negative aspects of NEOM City project. The country signed a contract worth $1.7 million, despite the ongoing COVID-19 crisis.

After the assassination of Jamal Khashoggi, there has been a general reluctance among the international community to invest in Saudi Arabia. In addition, assets were moved overseas and the Gulf became economically unattractive. Despite this, foreign investments in the country rose in 2018 by 110% over the previous year, according to the Ministry of Economy and Planning.

In 2021, Saudi Arabia hired the Boston Consulting Group, and some other Western consultants, regarding its interest in bidding to co-host the 2030 FIFA World Cup. These companies were given the responsibility of analyzing the possibilities of a Saudi bid. However, the bid was ultimately unsuccessful. Yet, uncertainties remained as Mohammed bin Salman maintained close ties with FIFA's President Gianni Infantino, and in 2023, Saudi Arabia eventually secured the rights to host the 2034 FIFA World Cup by itself. For the Vision 2030 program, Saudi has a major focus on sports, where it successfully signed contracts with Italy and Spain to host their domestic cup finals. In October 2021, as a part of a consortium, the PIF obtained an 80% stake in Premier League club Newcastle United, following a previous failed takeover attempt in 2020. Moreover, human rights groups have also been vocally opposing the Kingdom's efforts to stage major sports events, particularly after the assassination of Jamal Khashoggi. On 24 November 2024, Jeddah hosted the lucrative Indian Premier League auction as Saudi Arabia Cricket Federation mentions strengthening cricket's position on global stage, on line with Vision 2030.

In October 2021, Saudi authorities initiated a large-scale demolition and eviction plan for the Jeddah Central Project launched in December. The demolitions affected 558,000 people in more than 60 neighbourhoods. Amnesty International confirmed through official documents that some of the residents were notified about evictions only 24 hours before, while others were between 1–6 weeks. In some cases "evacuate" was written on the buildings, while the state media and billboards informed others about the demolitions to others. The state media was also spreading a narrative about the residents, stating that the majority of them were undocumented. It was claimed the neighbourhoods were "rife with diseases, crime, drugs and theft". In January 2022, Saudi authorities announced a compensation scheme, which didn't cover the foreign nationals that accounted for 47% of those evicted. The compensation value was to be appraised after the demolitions. Residents said the communities were being "destroyed" and it was difficult for the migrants to afford alternate housing. Some even complain about delays in compensation.

In July 2022, Mohammed bin Salman released a promotional video, taking further the plans to build a 105-mile-long linear city, dubbed as The Line. Part of Neom, the project was designed to incorporate flying cars, robotic maids, and an artificial moon between two parallel mirrored buildings. However, critics said it will create a "dystopian" facility. They were concerned that the utopian idea of The Line will harm the environment. Besides, it will also impact the movement of birds and other animals. A senior adviser to the New Urban Mobility Alliance, Carlos Felipe Pardo said, "This seems impossible, greatly limited or just plain artificial." The project also remained questionable due to the possibility of its completion. It was noted that it could take nearly 50 years to give life to the idea, but urban planners of "The Line" were under a pressure to complete it by 2030. Moreover, some of the Saudi's paused ambitious projects of the past also left the linear city's construction idea in doubt.

== See also ==
- Economy of Saudi Arabia
- MiSK Foundation
- Egypt Vision 2030
