= Lion tombs of Dedan =

- مقابر الأسود الدادنية (Arabic)
- Interactive map of Lion tombs of Dedan
- 26°38′50″N 37°54′58″E
- Cultures: Ancient lihyan
- Location: Al-'Ula, Saudi Arabia

History
- Built: between 600BCE-500BCE

Site notes
- Architectural style: Dadanitic

Lion tombs (Arabic: مقابر الأسود الدادنية) are ancient Dadanitic tombs cut from rock, with over than 20 tombs, located in the temple of Mahlab al-Naqa area of al-Ula, Saudi Arabia.

== History ==
The lion tombs are rock-cut burial niches decorated with reliefs of lions. The tombs are dated back between the 600 BCE-500 BCE. According to the religious beliefs of the day, the lions protected those buried within the tombs. These tombs are evidence of 2600 years of settlement in al-Ula, originally called Dedan.

== Bibliography ==
- Said Alsaid, Dedan Treasures of a Spectacular Culture, King Saud University.
