= Judaism in pre-Islamic Arabia =

Judaism was the first monotheistic religion practiced in pre-Islamic Arabia, predating the Common Era. Arabian Jews were linguistically diverse, and communities spoke: Greek, Aramaic, Arabic and Sabaic. The centers of Arabian Judaism were in the Northwest and South of the Arabian Peninsula, and political leadership by Arabian Jews is attested over South Arabia during the time of the Kingdom of Himyar from the late fourth to the early sixth centuries, and in some Hejazi oasis cities in northwestern Arabia whose populations were largely composed of the Jewish tribes of Arabia.

The origins of Arabian Judaism is not well understood. While no evidence exists to support any theory, some have speculated that these communities arose as a means of fleeing persecution and oppression during Babylonian, Roman, and other periods. The practice and diversity of Arabian Judaism is also not well understood. Pre-Islamic translations of Jewish scriptures into Arabian languages have not yet been found, suggesting that their religious culture was largely oral.

== South Arabia ==
=== Polytheistic background ===
Polytheistic religion in South Arabia prior to the fourth century was regionally organized and closely tied to individual kingdoms, tribes, and urban centers. In the Sabaean heartland of the Yemeni highlands, religious life was dominated by the worship of Almaqah, the principal god of the Sabaeans, who functioned as a dynastic and national deity. Major cult centers dedicated to Almaqah were located at Marib and Sirwah, where monumental temples and inscriptions attest to his central role, such as at the Temple of Awwam. Alongside Almaqah, other deities such as 'Athtar, a widely venerated astral god associated with rain, fertility, and warfare, were worshipped across multiple South Arabian polities, including Sabaʾ, Qataban and Hadhramaut, though often with locally specific epithets reflecting the affiliations of the tribe or region.

Distinct political entities maintained their own primary cults, reflecting a link between religion and territorial identity. In Qataban, centered in the Wadi Bayhan, the chief deity was ʿAmm, regarded as a protective ancestral god tied to kinship and social order, while Anbay and Hawbas appear as secondary deities in inscriptions. The Hadhramaut kingdom venerated Sayin, whose cult was concentrated in Shabwa and associated with royal legitimacy and judicial authority. In the southwest coastal regions and later in the Himyarite sphere, earlier polytheistic traditions included the worship of Shams, a solar goddess.

=== Judaism before the fourth century ===
Evidence for Judaism in South Arabia before the fourth century is sparse. According to Josephus in his Antiquities of the Jews, Herod the Great, the king of Judea in the 1^{st} century BC, contributed 500 men to the personal guard of the Roman governor Aelius Gallus to aid his invasion of South Arabia around 25/24 BC, which was ultimately unsuccessful.

=== Conversion in the fourth century ===
By 300 AD, the Himyarite Kingdom vanquished competing states (including Saba, Qataban and Hadrawat) to become the sole ruling power of South Arabia, uniting the region for the first time since the time of Karib'il Watar (c. early 7^{th} c. BC). In the second half of the fourth century, the traditional pantheon was abandoned and the ruling elite of Himyar adopted Judaism. Explicitly Jewish inscriptions by the elite are not common, and most present a neutral monotheism. The reason why is not exactly known, but possibilities include a superficial use of Judaism or the reliance on a more general cult of one God as a more reliable way to maintain unity among the diverse constituents of the Himyarite Kingdom.

Literary sources, such as the Book of the Himyarites and the Ecclessiastical History of Philostorgius say that the reason for the adoption of Judaism was to further distance themselves from attempts by the Byzantine Empire to convert them to Christianity. Islamic sources attribute the conversion to Abu Karib (r. c. 400–445), but contemporary inscriptions show that it had taken place earlier, during the reign of his father, Malkīkarib Yuha’min (r. c. 375–400).

The conversion of the fourth century resulted in the disappearance of polytheistic invocations from inscriptions. By the end of the century, the only god that continues to be named is the one god Rahmanan. One Sabaic inscription, Ja 856 (= Fa 60), describes the replacement of a polytheistic temple dedicated to the god al-Maqah with a mikrāb (meaning either the local version of a synagogue, or an original form of Jewish organization in Himyar). The evidence suggests a sharp break with polytheism coinciding with the appearance in texts of Jewish and Aramaic loanwords (‘ālam/world, baraka/bless, haymanōt/guarantee, kanīsat/meeting hall) and names (Yṣḥq/Isaac, Yhwd’/Juda, Yws’f/Joseph).

When monotheistic inscriptions begin to be found in Himyar in this time, the one new God is commonly named as "Lord of Heaven" and "Lord of Heaven and Earth". They also use synonymous names for Rahmanan, like Il, Ilān, and Ilāhān. These sources have been found spanning the whole of kingdom, from the highlands north of Sanaa to the southern highlands. The diffusion of Judaism throughout Himyar was therefore well underway in the fourth century, and it is possible that this process began earlier. By comparison, a presence of Christians in Himyar is rarely documented by local texts before the sixth century. Despite the rapid spread of the worship of the one god, it is likely that the worship of local cults survived was not immediately wiped out from private circles.

It is not known exactly how the Judaism of Himyar was practiced or interpreted. In the early period, the Judaism of the ruling elite was infrequently advertised or promoted.

=== Locally practiced Judaism ===
Judaism was also practiced by the locals, not only the elites, although attestation for this is not as strong. "Israel" is named in four inscriptions, replacing the word shaʿb/community found in pre-Jewish inscriptions. Inscriptions use phrases like "God of Israel" and "God of the Jews", announce the construction of a Jewish cemetery (MAFRAY-Ḥaṣī 1), and one (DJE 23), written in Hebrew and found 15 km east of Sanaa, names all twenty-four Priestly families (and their place of residence in Galilee) appointed to the protection of Solomon's Temple based on 1 Chronicles 24. It was written using biblical (instead of Aramaic) orthography.

Local inscriptions mention synagogues (mkrb) in the cities of Zafar, Marib, Rayda, Naʿd, Najr, Dulaʿ, and Tanʿim, implying a formal organization of South Arabian Judaism. The phrase hagios topos, which usually means a synagogue, has also been found from a 6^{th}-century Greek inscription from the port of Qāniʾ in Bi'r Ali, and an earlier 4^{th}-century Sabaic inscription. However, the interpretation of the former inscription and its building from Qani have been disputed. A Torah ark was found on a seal stone in a cemetery from the city of Zafar. Additional evidence is also known.

Christian Julien Robin argues that the epigraphic evidence argues against viewing the Judaism of Himyar as rabbinic. This is based on the absence of belief in the afterlife (shared by the Sadducees), the predominant use of a local language (Sabaic) as opposed to Hebrew, and the priestly emphasis of DJE 23, Himyarite Judaism may have been more "Priestly" than "Rabbinic". However, Iwona Gajda interprets DJE 23 as evidence for the presence of rabbinic Judaism, and further points to evidence that the loanwords present in Ḥasī 1 indicate that its author was strongly familiar with Jewish law.

=== Jewish symbols ===
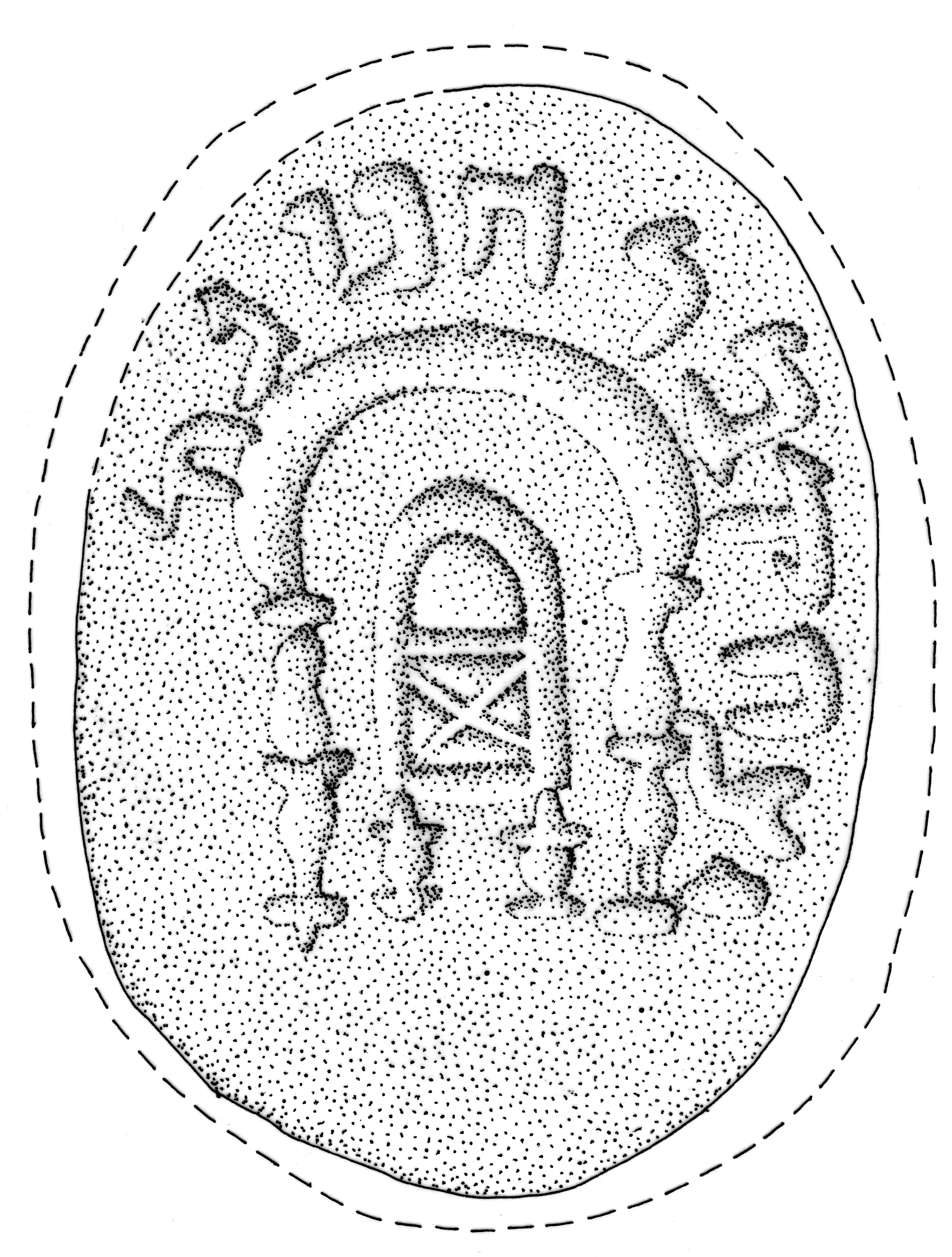
Seal ring from Zafar with writing "Yishaq bar Hanina" and a Torah ark, 330 BC – 200 AD

A small, but important number of artifacts have been found engraved with Jewish symbolism. Two artifacts have been found with menorahs. One of them has several menorahs inscribed, accompanied by an inscription that presents the authors as Jews (yhd). A drawing of a Torah shrine, accompanied by the name "Isaac son of Ḥanînah" (written in Jewish Aramaic), has been found from a seal in Zafar, the capital of Himyar. The Torah shrine symbol has also been found in Hima, north of Najran, dating to 523 AD. At one Jewish cemetery, a gezerah (a protective or prohibitive measure) has been found, composed by a Jew who must have known Jewish law competent in Hebrew and Aramaic.

=== Conversion from Judaism to Christianity ===
Around 500, the Kingdom of Aksum invaded the peninsula, overthrowing the Himyarite king and installing in his place the hardline Christian king Ma'dikarib Ya'fur . His successor, Dhu Nuwas (reigned 517–530) went on to try combatting the Christianizing influence from the Kingdom of Aksum militarily and massacred the Christian community of Najran, which is in part documented by an inscription made by S²rḥʾl Yqbl (Yusuf's army commander), Ja 1028, which describes the burning of a church and slaughtering of Abyssinians (Ethiopian Christians), claiming thousands of deaths and prisoners. These events are also discussed in several contemporary Christian sources; in the writings of: Procopius, Cosmas Indicopleustes, John Malalas and Jacob of Serugh. Soon afterwards, John of Ephesus (d. 588) related a letter from another contemporary, Mar Simeon, directed to Abbot von Gabula about the events. In addition, an anonymous author produced the Book of the Himyarites, a sixth-century Syriac chronicle of the persecution and martyrdom of the Christians of Najran. This event to a significant counterattack by the Ethiopian kingdom, leading to the conquest of Himyar in 525 and the end of the Jewish leadership of southern Arabia.

== Western Arabia ==
Islamic literature characterizes the Hejaz as hosting large Jewish populations. A document from the lifetime of Muhammad, the Constitution of Medina, is a pact between Muhammad's polity of believers and many Medinan Jewish tribes. The three major Jewish tribes of Medina, according to this literature, were the Banu Qaynuqa, the Banu Nadir, and the Banu Qurayza. A Jewish-Hebrew religious school, the bayt al-midrās, is said to have existed in Medina by Ibn Hisham, visited on occasion by both Muhammad and some of his followers. Some of Muhammad's followers are said to have been former rabbinical scholars. Beyond Medina, Islamic literature attests Jewish tribes in other major oases of the northern Hejaz, such as at Khaybar, Fadak and Tayma.

The Quran, a religious scripture and an early seventh century source from West Arabia, regularly mentions Jews and their beliefs, in both Meccan surahs and Medinan surahs. They are mentioned 23 times by the root hwd, 43 times as part of the "Children of Israel", and 32 as part of the "People of the Book". In its latest layers, the Quran repeatedly and directly engages with the Mishnah, likely reflecting a growing awareness and interaction with the Jewish scholarly elite.

Some contemporary, non-Islamic literary evidence also points to a Jewish presence. The Midrash Rabba says that two third-century rabbis believed it beneficial to travel to Hegra (Madāʾin Ṣālih) to improve their Aramaic. Procopius, a 6^{th}-century Byzantine historian, when commenting about the Tiran Island, says that the "Hebrews had lived from of old in autonomy, but in the reign of this Justinian they have become subject to the Romans."

Some pre-Islamic inscriptions also mention Jews and Judaism. One, from 203 AD, indicates a Jewish headman of the oasis of Tayma named Isaiah (whose father and brother also have biblical names). Jewish headmen of both Hegra and Dedan are also indicated by inscriptions from the mid-4^{th} century. One Dedanite inscription mentions a rabbi. A Jewish presence in Western Arabia is also known from the inscription UJadhNab 538.

Archaeological evidence has also now been found for a Jewish presence in the region, at Al-Ula, characterized by a sharp decline of the consumption of camel in the transition of the site's occupation into the late antique period.

Haggai Mazuz has argued that the Hijazi Arabian Judaism was rabbinic and halakhic, but his thesis has criticized for an uncritical reliance on traditional sources. While the nature of Hijazi Judaism remains controversial, some sort of rabbinic element is likely to have existed.

== Central and East Arabia ==
Evidence of Jews or Judaism in this region is tenuous. Christian Julien Robin has suggested that a governor of one of the tribes in central Arabia, Ḥujr, may have been Jewish. In eastern Arabia, Josephus claims that a son of the first-century king of Adiabene converted to Judaism.

== Jewish poets ==
The poetry of the pre-Islamic period has largely not survived outside of later compilations during the Islamic period, from the eighth century and thereafter. These compilations list many cases of Jewish poets, alongside the poetry that they created. However, the question of its authenticity is debated, as well as how much they were modified and Islamicized during transmission. The Ṭabaqāt fuḥūl al-shuʿarā ("The generations of the most outstanding poets"), composed by the Basran traditionalist and philologist Muḥummad ibn Sallām al-Jumaḥī (d. 846), records a list of Jewish poets. The Arabian/Arab antiquities collector Abū l-Faraj al-Iṣfahānī (d. 976) also has scattered reference to eleven Jewish poets in his Kitāb al-agānī ("Book of Songs"). The poets they refer to are as follows, followed by (J) if mentioned by al-Jumahi and (I) if they are mentioned by al-Isfahani:

- Samaw'al ibn 'Adiya (J) (I)
- Al-Rabi ibn Abu al-Huqayq (J) (I)
- Ka‘b ibn al-Ashraf (J) (I)
- Shurayḥ ibn ʿImrān (J) (I)
- Saʿya (Shuʿba) ibn Gharīḍ/ʿArīḍ (J) (I)
- Abū Qays ibn Rifāʿa (J) (I)
- Dirham ibn Zayd (J)
- Abū l-Dhayyāl (J) (I)
- Sarah of Qurayẓa (I)
- Kaʿb ibn Saʿd of Qurayẓa (I)
- Aws ibn Danī of Qurayẓa (I)

According to some traditions, Imru al-Qais also converted to Judaism.

The poetry ascribed to these figures rarely make reference to precise historical details or religious expressions, although some poems ascribed to al-Samaw'al in the Asma'iyyat collection are explicitly religious. In addition, al-Jumahi offers very little by way of biography for each of these figures other than to recount popular anecdotes that a few are associated with. Al-Isfahani gives more detailed biographical information. For example, he says Al-Samaw’al ibn ‘Ādiyā was a native of Tayma (in northwestern Arabia) whose father had ties to the Ghassanids. He lived in a family home often called a castle and whose name was al-Ablaq. Popular stories described his fidelity and loyalty, such as one where he refuses the surrender of the possessions of Imru' al-Qais to Imru's enemies despite their attempt to besiege his castle. Asides from Samaw'al, the only other Jewish poet to earn some renown was al-Rabī‘ ibn Abī l-Ḥuqayq, chief of the Naḍir tribe. The earliest sources make no mention of this figure, but only his son Kināna. Instead, it is only with the work of al-Isfahani that the exploits of al-Rabī‘ are described.

== Origins of Jewish communities in Arabia ==
How Judaism entered Arabia remains controversial. Some theories center on migrations that took place after the destruction of the Second Temple during the Jewish–Roman wars or in the aftermath of Persian, Babylonian, or Roman persecutions, but these theories remain speculation. Two different accounts of the origins of Arabian Judaism are known from Islamic sources, centering on expulsions during the time of Moses or as a means to escape oppressive Roman governance, though neither account can be verified.

== Relations with Jews outside of the Arabian Peninsula ==
Jewish literature outside of Yemen rarely mentions the Jewish community there. However, an exception to this can be found in the verses of the contemporary, sixth-century Byzantine Jewish poet named Eleazar beRabbi Qallir.

However, epigraphs from Palestine and Jordan do reflect communication and knowledge from the Yemenite Jewish community:

- An inscription from Palestine using the Sabaic script (a South Arabian script) is known.
- A Greek inscription from the village of Beit She'arim mentions the burial of a "Himyarite".
- A fifth-century Hebrew epitaph from Zoara, Jordan describes an individual named Ywsh br ʾWfy who "died in Ẓafār, the land of the Ḥimyarites".
- DJE 23, a Hebrew inscription suggesting familiarity with Temple-based Judaism

These communication routes may have also transferred rabbinic and other Jewish teachings.

In addition, evidence from the Talmud and the Syriac Book of the Himyarites shows that members of priestly tribes known as Cohanim originating from the land of Israel were active in the Himyarite Kingdom.

== Sources ==
Sources about pre-Islamic Arabian Judaism are limited and fragmentary. They are mostly inscriptions. However, inscriptions usually do not mention the religion of the author, forcing reliance on indirect evidence, such as a Jewish name, Jewish expressions, and use of the Hebrew script. The only literary reference to these communities between Greek and Syriac sources is one passing reference by Josephus. The extensive Jewish literary record rarely makes mention of Jews living in Arab lands. The Talmud occasionally mentions Arabia, however, most references are about regions in southern Israel and Jordan instead of the Arabian Peninsula.

The only contemporary Islamic sources are the Quran and the Constitution of Medina. ameliorate the situation. Pre-Islamic Arabic poetry, written down in the Islamic era, has several examples of the creations of Jewish poets, but the date, revision history, and authenticity of these Jewish poems are unclear. Much more systematic detail about the situation is found in Islamic-Arabic histories of pre-Islamic Arabia, but the reliability of these sources is doubtful, such as the works of Al-Hamdani. Geographically, these sources place significant Jewish presences in Yemen, either in its entirety (Ya'qubi) or all of Himyar in addition to parts of Kinda (Ibn Hazm), as well as in Medina, prominently including the tribes of Banu Nadir, the Banu Qaynuqa, and the Banu Qurayza. Nevertheless, evidence regarding the size and nature of a Jewish Medinan community remains phantasmal in the pre-Islamic evidence.

== After Islam ==
Despite some opinions in Islamic tradition that all Jews should be expelled from the Arabian Peninsula, their continued survival in the region and even in the Hejaz after the advent of Islam is also documented in Islamic sources, as well as some non-Jewish sources. In South Arabia, large populations of Yemenite Jews persisted until around the mid-twentieth century, but after a large transport undertaken by Operation Magic Carpet in 1949–1950, they now live in Israel. The same operation also transported around 2,000 Jews in Saudi Arabia to Israel. Large Jewish populations are attested in the north Arabian site of Qurh in the ninth–tenth centuries AD.

== List of Jewish epigraphs ==
This list is according to the 2012 compilation by Robert Hoyland. The inscriptions span at least five centuries, only number thirty-one if all are accepted as Jewish, are written in a variety of scripts/languages although most are in Nabataean Aramaic, are typically brief, and are geographically limited insofar as nearly all hail from Hegra or Al-Ula.

Text	Place	Type	Date	Script/Lang
This is the tomb which Shubaytu son of Aliu, the Jew (yhwdy), made for himself and for his children and for Amirat, his wife. They may be buried in it by hereditary title. And no stranger has the right to be buried in it, and if any of the children of Shubaytu mentioned above or their legal heirs seeks to write for this tomb a deed of gift or any document, he will have no share in this tomb. And this was on the first day of Ab, the third year of King Maliku, King of the Nabataeans. Abd Obodat son of Wahballahi made it	Hegra	Tomb inscription	42/43 AD	Nabataean Aramaic
Manasse son of Natan, greetings/farewell	Hegra	Construction, base of sundial	1^{st} c. AD	Nabataean Aramaic
This is the stele which Yaḥyā son of Simon has built for his father Simon who died in the month of Sīwan of the year 201	al-Ula	Tomb inscription	307 AD	Nabataean Aramaic
May Jacob son of Samuel be remembered well	Hegra	Graffito	3^{rd} - 5^{th} c.	Nabataean Aramaic
This is the memorial of Isaiah Neballaṭa son of Joseph, the headman of Tayma, which ʿImram and Ašmw, his brothers, erected for him in the month of Iyar of the year 98 of the province	Tayma	Graffito	203 AD	Nabataean Aramaic
This is the stele and tomb, which Adyon son of Ḥaniy son of Samuel, the headman of Hegra, built for his wife Mawiyah, daughter of the headman of Tayma, Amr son of Adyon son of Samuel, who died in the month of Ab in the year 251, aged 38 years	Hegra	Tomb inscription	356/7 AD	Nabataean Aramaic
Daniel	Hegra	Graffito	1^{st} - 3^{rd} c. AD	Nabataean Aramaic
Abīyu son of Salmu	al-Ula	Graffito	1^{st} - 3^{rd} c. AD	Nabataean Aramaic
May ʿEzer be remembered well	Hegra	Graffito	1^{st} - 3^{rd} c. AD	Nabataean Aramaic
ʿAzaryah son of Asyah	al-Ula	Graffito	3^{rd} - 1^{st} c. BC	Lihyanite (Dedanitic)
"By Ahab son of Simak the one buried [here]" or "By/for Ahab son of Simak is the tomb"	al-Ula	Graffito	3^{rd} - 1^{st} c. BC	Lihyanite (Dedanitic)
Greetings/Farewell Joseph son of ʿAwiyu	al-Ula	Graffito	3^{rd} - 1^{st} c. BC	Nabataean Aramaic
Levi	al-Ula	Graffito	1^{st} - 3^{rd} c. AD	Nabataean Aramaic
May Ghanam son of Yehūdā be remembered	Umm Judhayidh	Graffito	1^{st} c. BC - 1^{st} c. AD	Nabataean Aramaic
May Joseph son of Ghanam be remembered well. Peace	Umm Judhayidh	Graffito	1^{st} c. BC - 1^{st} c. AD	Nabataean Aramaic
Indeed, may Simon son of Adiyu be remembered	Hegra	Graffito	3^{rd} - 5^{th} c. AD	Nabataean Aramaic
May Laḥmu son of Yehūdā be remembered well	al-Ula	Graffito	3^{rd} - 5^{th} c. AD	Nabataean Aramaic
Peace on the tomb of R{mn}h his wife, daughter of Joseph, son of ʿRr, who is from Qurayyā, who died on the twenty-sixth day of April, year one hundred and seventy-five	al-Mabiyyat	Tomb inscription	280 AD	Nabataean Aramaic
This is Abisalo(m?) son of Susannah	al-Ula	Graffito	Uncertain	Hebrew/ Arabic
Blessing to Aṭūr son of Menaḥem and rabbi Jeremiah	al-Ula	Graffito	Uncertain	Hebrew/ Arabic
May Samuel son of Hillel be blessed and protected	Wadi Haggag	Graffito	2^{nd} - 4^{th} c. AD	Hebrew/ Arabic
Blessed be the name of my Lord	Jubbah	Graffito	Uncertain	Hebrew/ Arabic
Nam/Nuaym son of Isaac trusts in God. He has written (this).	al-Ula	Graffito	Uncertain	Hebrew/ Arabic
This is what has written . . . (hd mh ktb) and this is what . . .	al-Ula	Graffito	Uncertain	Hebrew/ Arabic
And Ismaīl son of Ṣdq has written	al-Ula	Graffito	Uncertain	Hebrew/ Arabic
God be blessed/Bless God	al-Ula	Graffito	Uncertain	Hebrew/ Arabic
This is the tomb which ʿAbday son of Tayma built for PN who [died?] on the twenty-seventh of š[ebaṭ?] . . . two hundred years ten/twenty . . .	al-Ula	Tomb inscription	4^{th} c. AD?	Nabataean Aramaic
. . . bn . . . bn b[r] . . . ytpt y . . . klhw . . . wn . . .	Tayma	Commemorative	Uncertain	Nabataean Aramaic / Jewish Aramaic

== See also ==
- Christianity in pre-Islamic Arabia
- Jewish tribes of Arabia
- Religion in pre-Islamic Arabia
- Talmud

== Sources ==
- Al-Jallad, Ahmad (2021). "The 'One' God in a Safaitic Inscription". Eretz-Israel: Archaeological, Historical and Geographical Studies: 37–47.
- Bayir, Muhammed Emin (2025). "Jewish Poets and Arabic Literary Culture in Pre-Islamic Arabia: Origins, Themes, and Questions of Authenticity". Ilahiyat Studies. 16 (1): 123–146.
- Finster, Barbara (2017). "The Material Culture of Pre‐ and Early Islamic Arabia". In Flood, Finbarr Barry; Necipoğlu, Gülru (eds.). A Companion to Islamic Art and Architecture. John Wiley & Sons. pp. 61–88.
- Gajda, Iwona (2026). "Religions of Ancient South Arabia From Polytheism to Monotheism in the Context of Political, Economic and Social Evolutions (Fourth–Sixth Centuries CE)". Arabian Archaeology and Epigraphy: 1–18.
- Lindstedt, Ilkka (2026). "The Religious Groups of Mecca and Medina in the Sixth and Seventh Centuries CE". Abdou Filali-Ansary Occasional Paper Series. 11: 1–31.
- Munt, Harry (2015). ""No two religions": Non-Muslims in the early Islamic Ḥijāz". Bulletin of the School of Oriental and African Studies. 78 (2): 249–269.
- Robin, Christian Julien (2021). "Judaism in pre-Islamic Arabia". In Ackerman-Lieberman, Phillip Isaac (ed.). The Cambridge history of Judaism. Cambridge University Press. pp. 294–331.
