= Al-Ula Development Company =

Company based in Saudi Arabia

- Native name: شركة العلا للتطوير
- Company type: Private
- Industry: Hospitality; Real estate development
- Founded: 30 January 2023; 3 years ago
- Founder: Public Investment Fund
- Headquarters: Al-Ula, Saudi Arabia
- Key people: Fabien Toscano (CEO); Naif AlHamdan (Managing Director)
- Owner: Public Investment Fund
- Website: www.udc.sa

Al-Ula Development Company (UDC; Arabic: شركة العلا للتطوير) is a hospitality and real estate development company based in Al-Ula, Saudi Arabia. The company was founded in January 2023 by the Public Investment Fund as part of Saudi Vision 2030. The company aims to transform Al-Ula into a global tourist destination.

== History ==
UDC was officially launched by the Public Investment Fund on 30 January 2021 as part of Saudi Vision 2030 plan to diversify the Saudi Economy away from oil. UDC, in collaboration with the Royal Commission for Al-Ula, aim to turn Al-Ula into a global tourist destination.

On 13 September 2023, signed an agreement with Marriott International to open a 250-key hotel in Al-Ula. The hotel is set to open in 2025.

On 30 October 2023, UDC signed an agreement with Six Senses to open a hotel in Al-Ula. The hotel features 100 guest villas and 25 residences. The hotel is expected to be completed in 2027.

== Assets ==
As of March 2024, there are 5 operating assets under Al-Ula Development Company, which are:

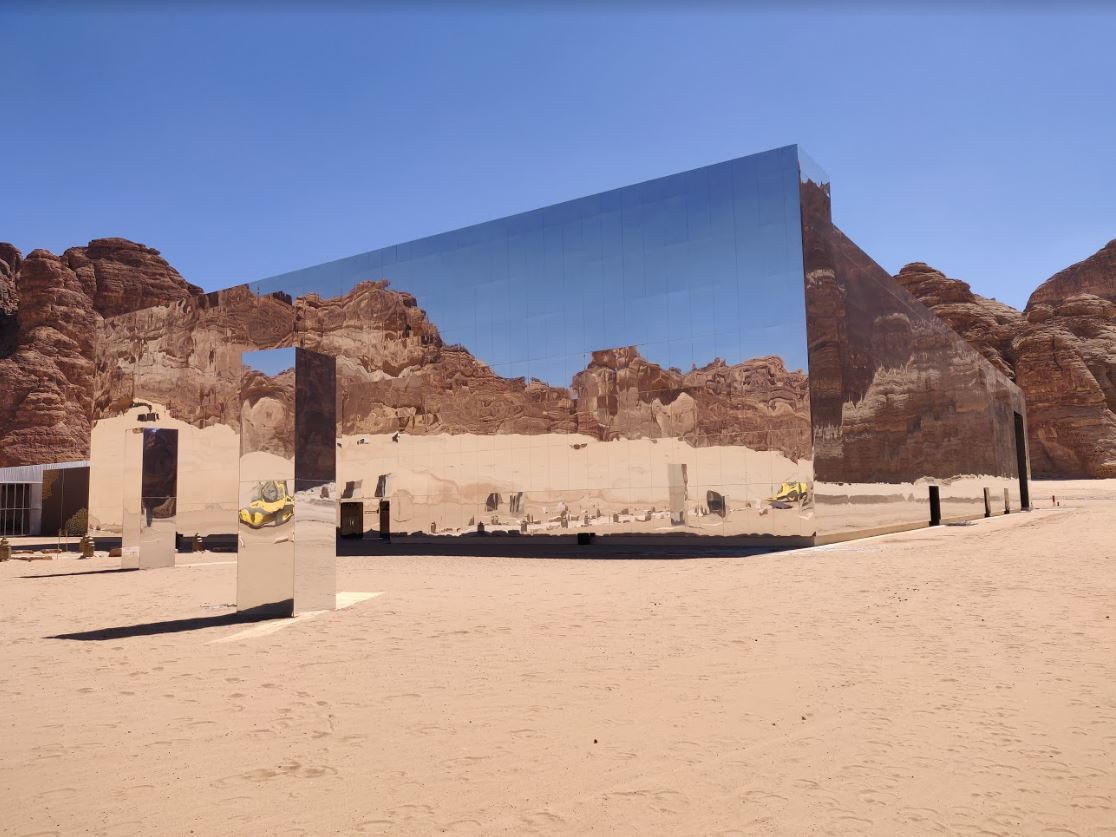
Maraya Concert Hall, the largest mirror building in the world

- Habitas AlUla
- Caravan by Habitas
- Banyan Tree AlUla
- Cloud7 Residence AlUla
- Maraya Concert Hall

== See also ==
- List of Saudi Vision 2030 Projects
- Saudi Vision 2030
- Al Balad Development Company
- Soudah Development Company
- Jeddah Central Development Company
