= ULH =

ULH may refer to:

- Prince Abdul Majeed bin Abdulaziz International Airport, the IATA code ULH
- Ultra-light Helicopter, a type of aircraft
