= Midad Real Estate =

Saudi Arabian private real estate development company

- Native name: مداد العقارية
- Company type: Private company
- Industry: Real estate development
- Founded: 2005
- Headquarters: Riyadh, Saudi Arabia
- Key people: Abdulelah bin Mohammed Al Aiban (President)
- Website: midad.com.sa

Midad Real Estate (Arabic: مداد العقارية) is a Saudi Arabian real estate development company headquartered in Riyadh, Saudi Arabia. The company operates in the real estate development sector, focusing on large-scale hospitality and mixed-use projects.

== History ==
In November 2022, Midad Real Estate and Four Seasons Hotels and Resorts entered into an agreement to develop the Four Seasons Hotel and Private Residences Jeddah at the Corniche, a new-build development on the New Jeddah Corniche overlooking the Red Sea, located near the historic area of Al-Balad and the Jeddah Corniche Circuit.

In November 2025, during the TOURISE Global Summit in Riyadh, Midad Real Estate announced a joint venture with Jeddah Central Development Company (JCDC), a subsidiary of the Public Investment Fund and Kerzner International, owner of the Atlantis and One&Only brands to develop Atlantis and One&Only in Jeddah Central. The total of the properties' value exceeds $2.03 billion, with Midad Real Estate serving as the developer for both properties, which will be situated within the Jeddah Central waterfront masterplan on the Red Sea coast. The two developments represent the first presence of both brands in Saudi Arabia.

In January 2026, Midad Real Estate and Diriyah Company, a developer owned by Saudi Arabia's Public Investment Fund signed a joint development agreement for the Four Seasons Hotel and Private Residences Diriyah. The total value of the development is estimated at $827 million, including land acquisition and construction costs.
