= Al-Ula International Airport =

Airport in Al-Ula, Saudi Arabia

- IATA: ULH; ICAO: OEAO

Summary
- Airport type: Public
- Owner: Royal Commission for Al-Ula
- Operator: Matarat Holding Company
- Serves: Al-Ula Governorate
- Location: Al-Ula, Medina Province, Saudi Arabia
- Opened: 31 October 2011; 14 years ago
- Elevation AMSL: 624 m (2,047 ft)
- Coordinates: 26°29′0″N 038°7′1″E

Map
- Location in Saudi Arabia ULH/OEAO (Asia) ULH/OEAO (West and Central Asia)

Runways
Direction	Length		Surface
Direction	m	ft	Surface
12/30	3,050	10,007	Asphalt

Al-Ula International Airport (IATA: ULH, ICAO: OEAO) is an international airport serving the Al-Ula governorate in the Medina Province of Saudi Arabia, supporting access to the region's major tourism destinations.

The planned capacity of the airport was 100,000 passengers per year, including both tourists and locals. After its expansion in 2021, the airport's capacity increased to 400,000 annual passengers.

== History ==
The airport began operations on 31 October 2011 under the name “Prince Abdul majeed bin Abdulaziz Domestic Airport" when the first flight from Riyadh operated by Saudia. it was named after Abdul Majeed bin Abdulaziz Al Saud. It is the closest airport to the pre-Islamic archaeological site of Hegra and Al-Ula Heritage Village. The airport is the first one in Saudi Arabia specifically designed to serve people coming to the region for visiting purposes.

In March 2021, the General Authority of Civil Aviation in Saudi Arabia has approved the landing of international flights at the airport. According to Saudi Press Agency, the airport's annual capacity has increased from 100,000 passengers to 400,000 and its area has increased to 2.4 million square meters. After this expansion, the airport was officially renamed "Al-Ula International Airport".

In October 2023, The Royal Commission for Al-Ula announced a new expansions of the airport, in addition to its new designs. The new expansion will increase the capacity from 400,000 to 6 million passengers every year. The airport will also serve as a logistics hub in Saudi Arabia's northwest.

== Airlines and destinations ==
Airlines	Destinations
Flydubai	Dubai–International
Flynas	Bahrain, Dammam, Dubai–International, Jeddah, Kuwait City, Riyadh
Gulf Air	Seasonal: Bahrain
Qatar Airways	Doha
Royal Jordanian	Seasonal: Amman–Queen Alia
Saudia	Jeddah, Riyadh

== See also ==
- List of airports in Saudi Arabia
