= Winter at Tantora Festival =

Festival in Saudi Arabia

Winter at Tantora Festival شتاء طنطورة
- Status: Active
- Frequency: Annual
- Locations: Al-Ula, Medina
- Country: Saudi Arabia
- Years active: 2018–present
- Website: www.experiencealula.com

The Winter at Tantora Festival (Arabic: شتاء طنطورة) is an annual cultural festival held in the old town of Al-'Ula, Medina, located in northwestern Saudi Arabia. The first festival began on 21 December 2018, and was running a series of eight-weekend concerts for world-class musicians. In addition to this, the festival also features other activities and events. The festival's second edition began on 19 December 2019, and a third edition is currently in the works.

== Name ==
The name of the festival 'Tantora' is inspired by a sundial located in the old town of Al-'Ula, used by the locals as a marker for the changing of the seasons.

== Events 2018-2019 Festival ==
- Concerts : The first edition of the festival hosted the Italian singer Andrea Bocceli, the Greek composer Yanni and the French violinist Renaud Capuçon.
- Hot air balloon festival.
- Light and Life celebration.
- Fursan Endurance Horse Race, 2 February 2019

== Events 2019-2020 Festival ==
- Concerts
- Hot air balloon festival
- Fursan Endurance Horse Race

== See also ==
- Tourism in Saudi Arabia
