= Al Hajar, Saudi Arabia =

Coordinates: 26°48′22″N 037°57′18″E

Al Hajar (مركز الحجر) is a municipality and village in Al-'Ula, Medina Region, Saudi Arabia. It lies in the northeastern part of the governorate, 55 km from Al-'Ula on the road to Asfelti. The municipality covers an area of 2,435 square kilometres (940 sq mi), and had a population of 1,707 as of 2013.

The UNESCO site of the ruins of Mada'in Saleh is located within the Al Hajar municipality.
