= Old Town, Al-Ula =

The Old Town (Al-Ula) البلدة القديمة (العلا)
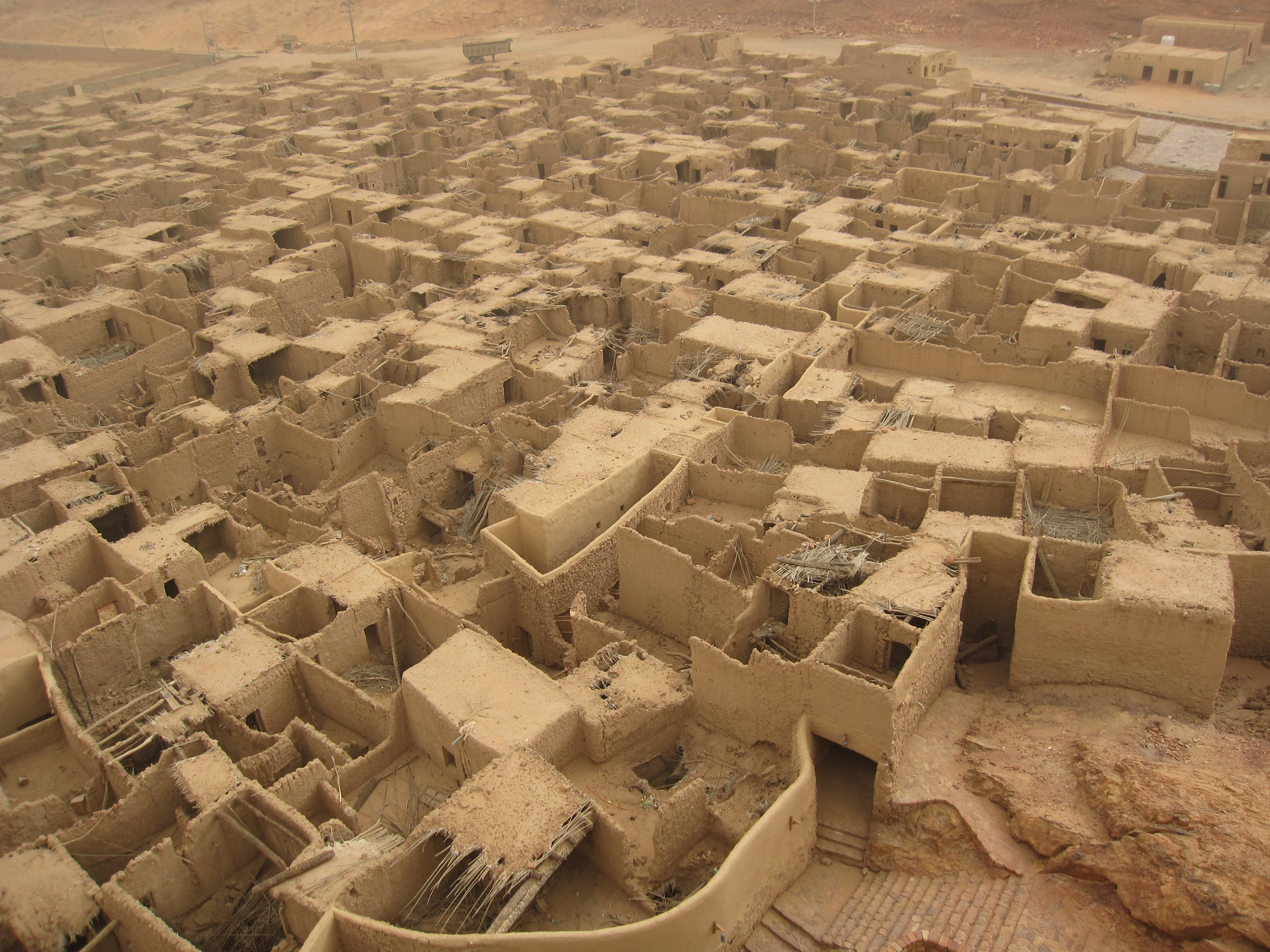
- Al-Ula old town

- Location within Saudi Arabia
- Coordinates: 26°37′N 37°55′E
- Country: Saudi Arabia
- region: al-Madinah

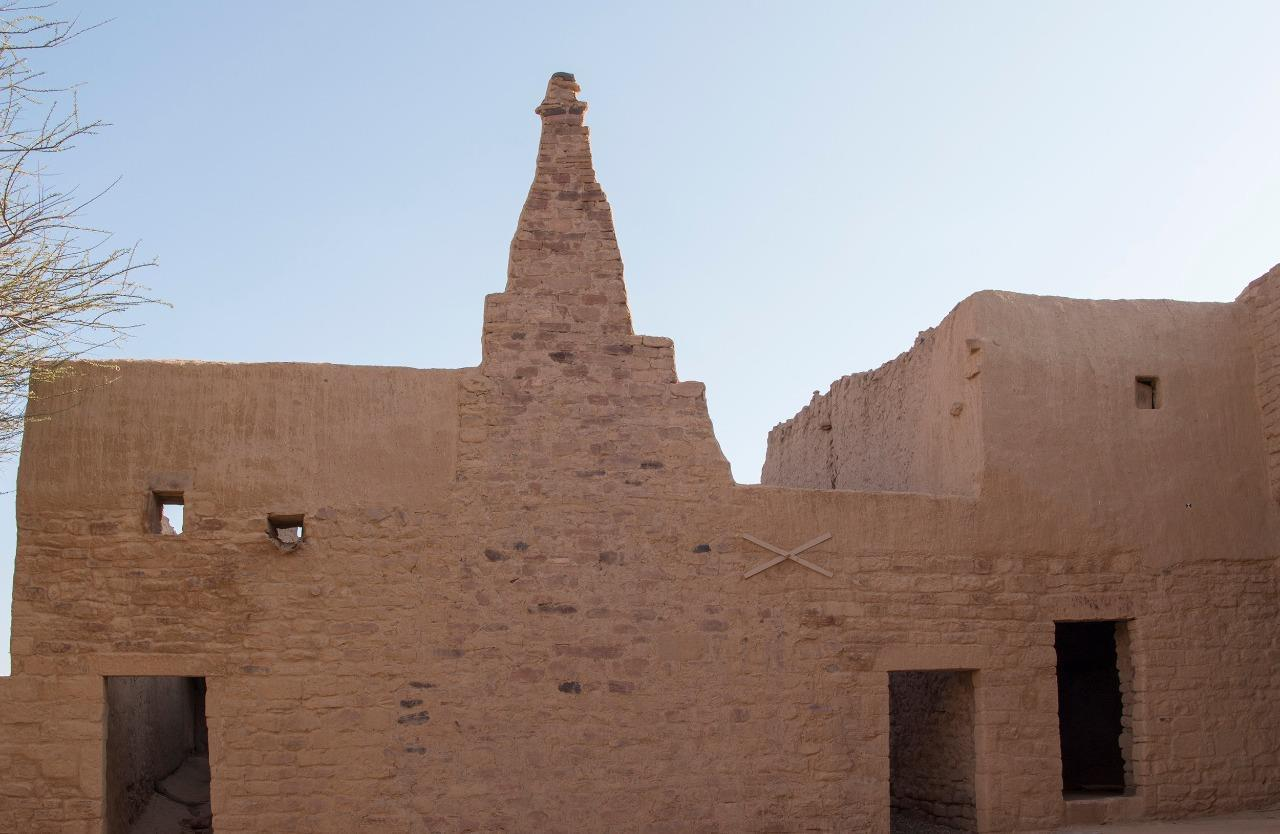
Tantora historic solar timekeeping device

The Old Town is an archaeological site near al-‘Ulā, Medina Province, Saudi Arabia. It is known as al-Dirah (Arabic: دِيرَة, romanized: dīrah, lit. 'town'). Inside al-Dīrah are ancient heritage buildings, mosques (masjid), and markets, dating back about seven centuries, currently under restoration development. This town is 22 kilometres (14 mi) away from Hegra. The heritage town looks like a single building due to the crowding of its 870 residential units, along with more than 400 shops and five town squares. These units are separated by narrow and winding alleys. The town is divided into two districts: al-Shqīq in the north and al-Ḥilf in the south.

== Remaining monuments (archeological sites) ==
- Mousa Bin Nusayr castle.
- Tantora is a historic solar timekeeping device which marked the beginning of the agricultural season, becoming an essential guide for daily life, seasonal farming cycles, and the timing of water distribution. It is naamegiving of the Winter at Tantora Festival.

== See also ==
- Sarat Mountains
- Winter at Tantora Festival
