= Banyan Tree AlUla =

Hotel in Al-'Ula, Saudi Arabia

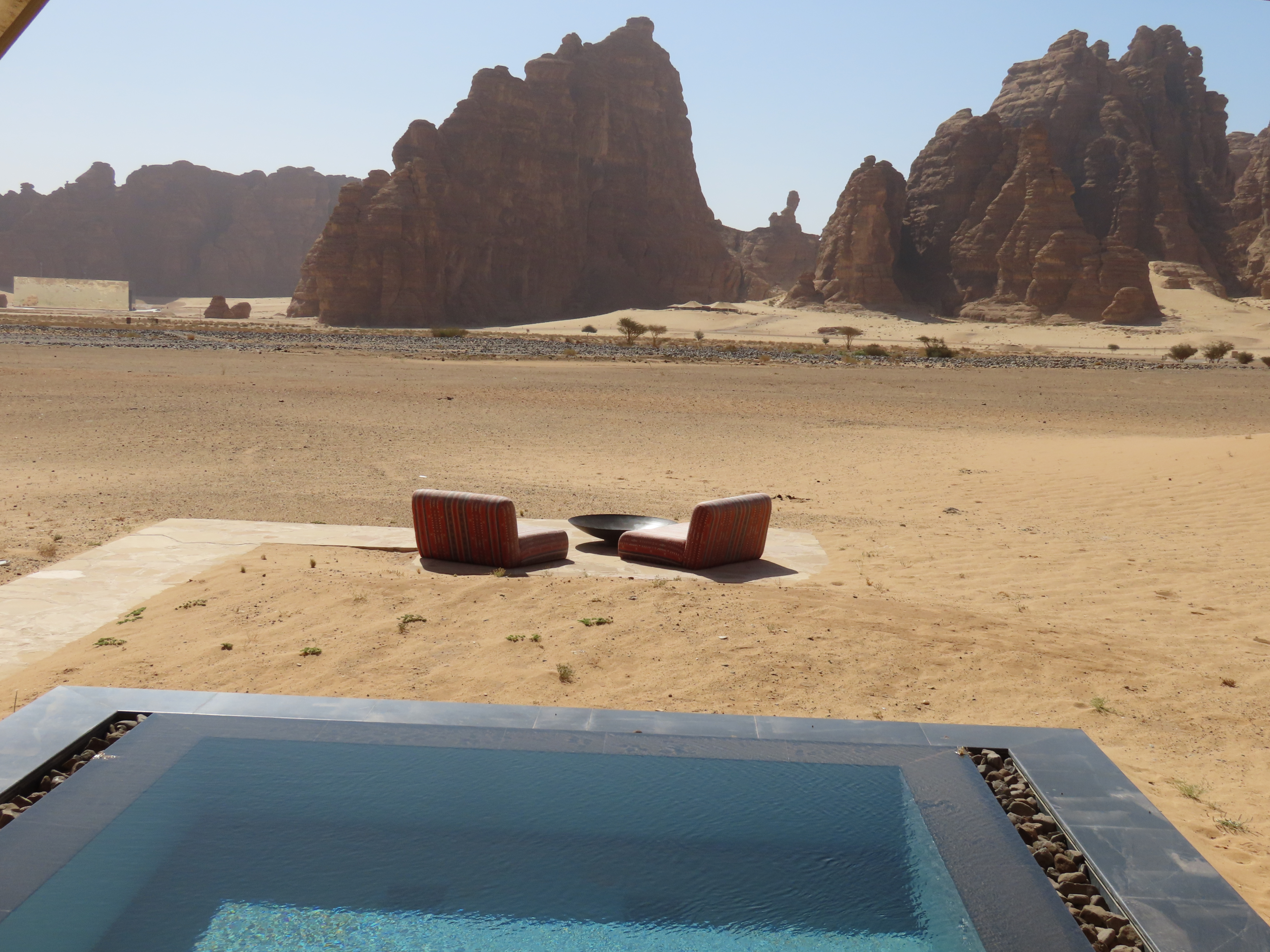
- View of Wadi Ashar from the hotel

- Location within Saudi Arabia

General information
- Classification: Glamping
- Location: Al-'Ula, Saudi Arabia, Wadi Ashar, Hegra, Saudi Arabia
- Coordinates: 26.7439°N 37.8497°E
- Opening: October 21, 2022
- Owner: Banyan Tree Holdings

Design and construction
- Architect: AW2

Other information
- Number of rooms: 79

Website
- Banyan Tree AlUla

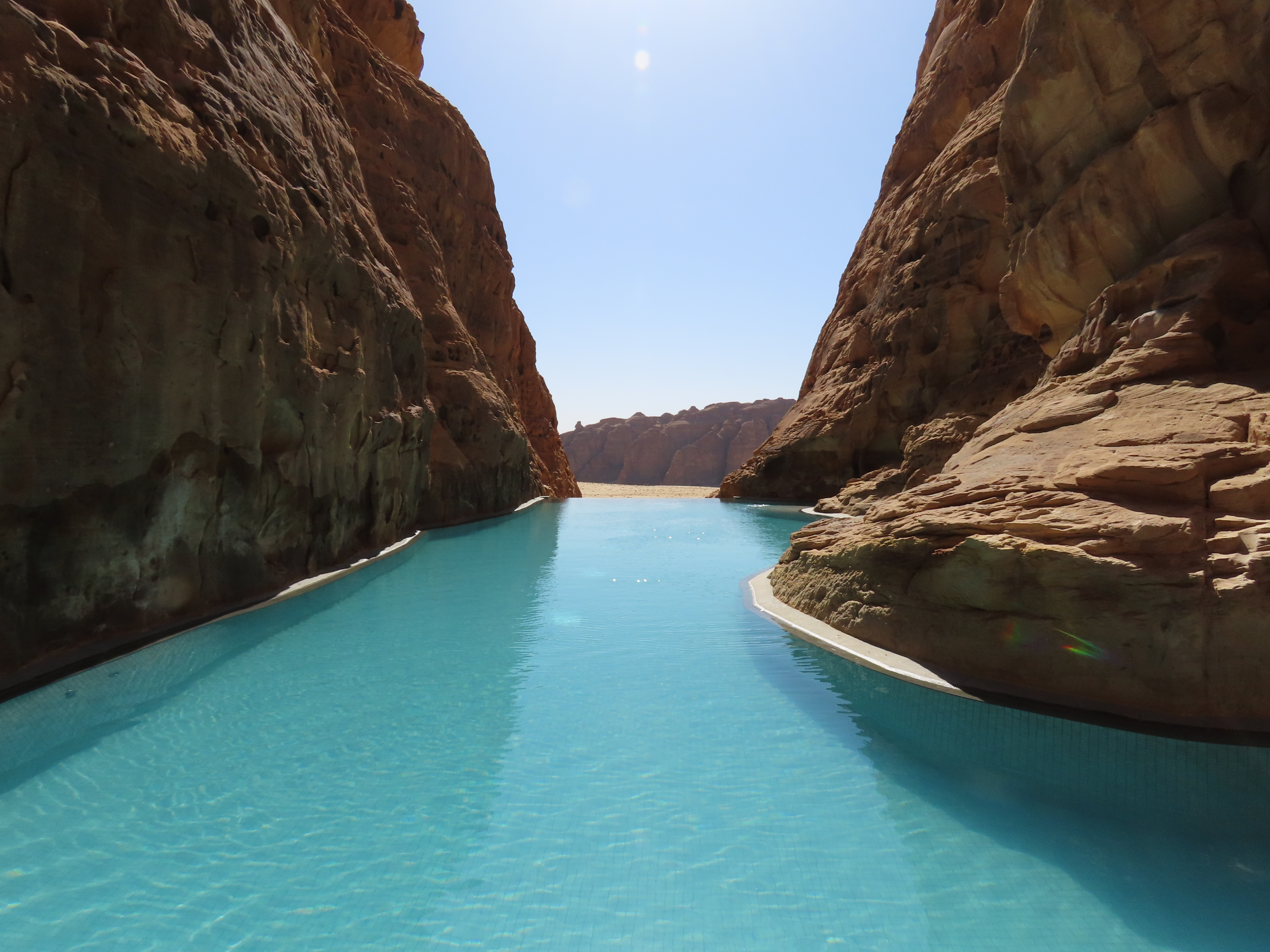
Rock pool

Banyan Tree AlUla is a luxury resort hotel located in Wadi Ashar, Al-'Ula, Saudi Arabia.

The hotel opened in October 2022, with Mariah Carey performing at its opening ceremony. It consists of 79 luxury tents in the desert. The resort features an infinity pool.
