= Jeddah Central Development Company =

Company based in Saudi Arabia

- Native name: شركة وسط جدة للتطوير
- Type: Private
- Industry: Urban development Real estate development
- Founded: 17 December 2021; 4 years ago
- Founder: Mohammed bin Salman
- Headquarters: Jeddah, Saudi Arabia
- Key people: Mohammed Bin Salman (Chairman); Ahmed Al Sulaim (CEO)
- Owner: Public Investment Fund
- Subsidiaries: Jeddah Central
- Website: www.jeddahcentral.com

Jeddah Central Development Company (JCDC; Arabic: شركة وسط جدة للتطوير) is an urban and real estate development company based in Jeddah, Saudi Arabia. The company was founded in December 2021 by Crown Prince Mohammed bin Salman as part of Saudi Vision 2030. JCDC is owned by the Public Investment Fund. The company is responsible for the development of the $20 billion Jeddah Central project.

== History ==
JCDC was officially launched by Mohammed bin Salman on 17 December 2021 as part of the Saudi Vision 2030 plan to diversify the Saudi Economy away from oil.

== Projects ==
=== Jeddah Central ===
In September 2023, Jeddah Central Development Company launched Jeddah Central, a $20 billion project to develop central Jeddah. The project spans over an area of 5.7 km^{2} and includes 4 main landmarks, which are: a stadium, museum, oceanarium and opera house. The stadium is expected to host both the 2027 AFC Asian Cup and the 2034 FIFA World Cup.

== See also ==
- List of Saudi Vision 2030 Projects
- Saudi Vision 2030
- Al Balad Development Company
- Soudah Development Company
- Al-Ula Development Company
