= Royal Commission for Al-Ula =

Governing body of AlUla Governorate, Saudi Arabia

Royal Commission for AlUla
- الهيئة الملكية لمحافظة العلا

Agency overview
- Formed: July 20, 2017; 9 years ago
- Type: Government agency
- Jurisdiction: Government of Saudi Arabia
- Agency executives: Mohammed bin Salman, Chairman; Bader bin Farhan, Governor; Abeer Al-Akel, CEO
- Website: www.rcu.gov.sa/en/

The Royal Commission for AlUla (Arabic: الهيئة الملكية لمحافظة العلا) is the governing body of AlUla Governorate in Medina Province, Saudi Arabia. It is responsible for preserving and developing the governorate’s 2,000-year-old archaeological and historical sites.

== Importance of AlUla ==
AlUla is the home of The Archaeological Site of Hegra, the largest conserved site of the civilization of the Nabataeans which is the first UNESCO World Heritage property to be inscribed in Saudi Arabia.

== Development ==
On April 10, 2018, an agreement of cooperation was signed between Saudi Arabia and France to develop the site and transform it to a cultural site with the purpose to open the site to the regional and international visitors. the major components of the agreement were associated with the cultural, heritage, natural, tourism, human and economic development of AlUla and including preservation and planning of the archaeological and architectural heritage. Part of the developments is the plan to open a 22.4 km long touristic tramline by 2030.

== Scholarship Program ==
The RCU organizes a scholarship program where many Saudi students are sent to different universities in USA, UK, France and Australia. Under this scholarship, students study subjects related to the areas of hospitality, tourism, agriculture, archaeology and heritage. In 2019, 156 students, preparing for bachelor, master or PhD, are enrolled in the program that aims at enabling Saudi youth in general and residents of AlUla in particular to work in the flourishing area.

The Royal Commission for AlUla has concluded a partnership agreement with Ferrandi-Paris School to provide cooking training courses to chefs of AlUla. The trained chefs will then work during Tantourah Winter Festival to serve guests.

== See also ==
- AlUla FC
- Saudi Vision 2030
- Tourism in Saudi Arabia
- AlUla Development Company
