= Al-Ula =

Governorate of Medina Region, Saudi Arabia

al-Ula العلا
- City and Governorate
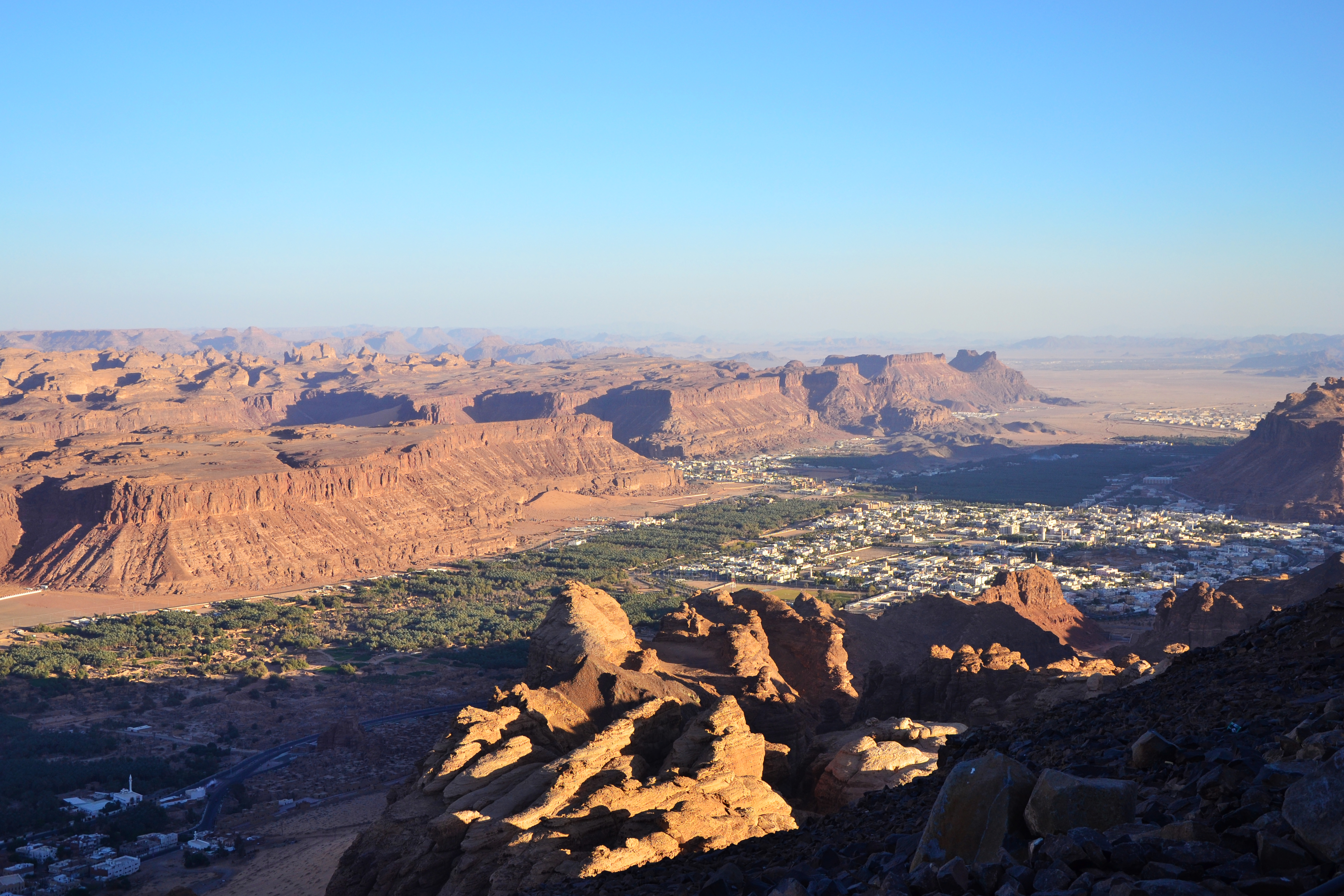
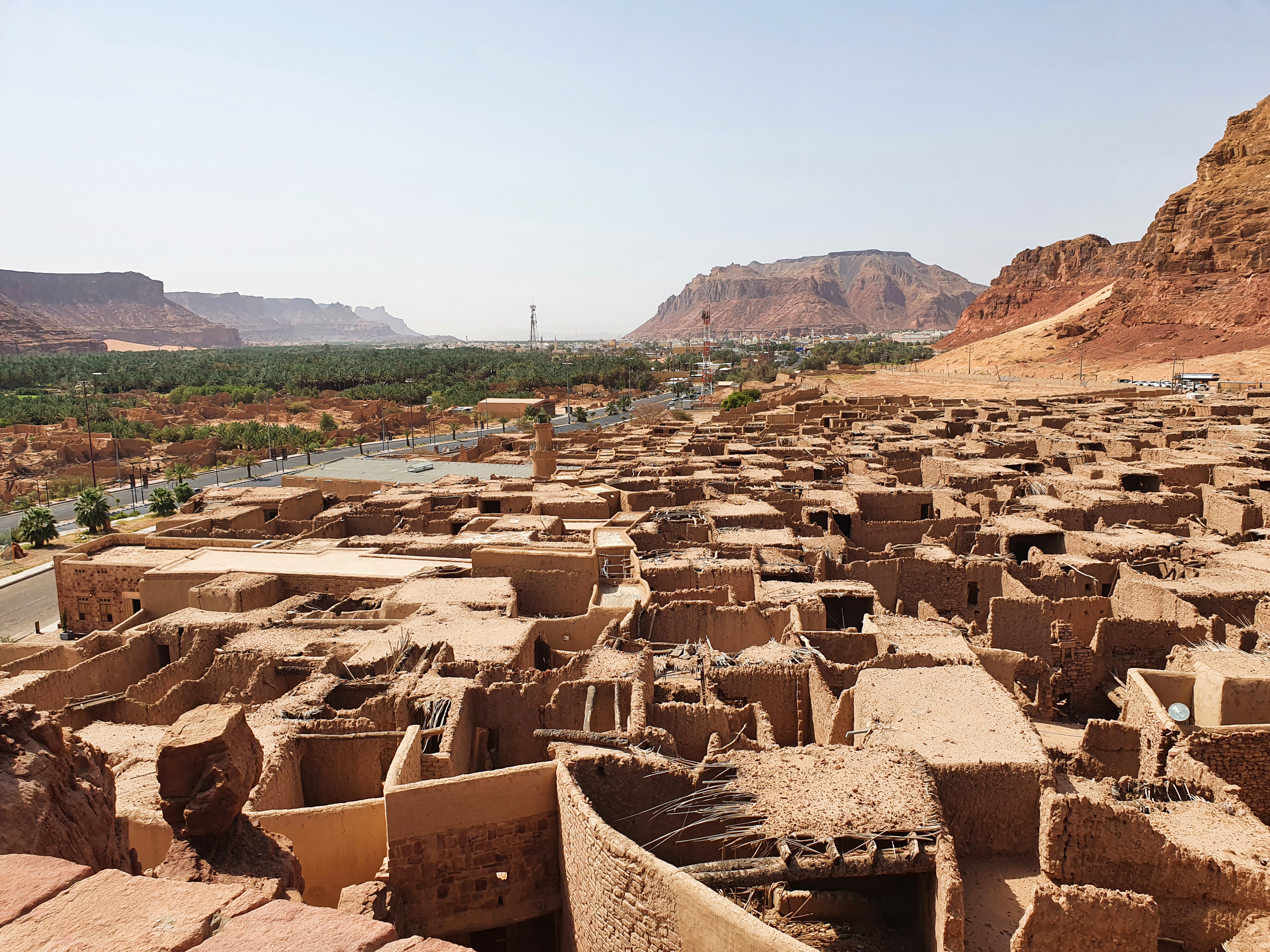
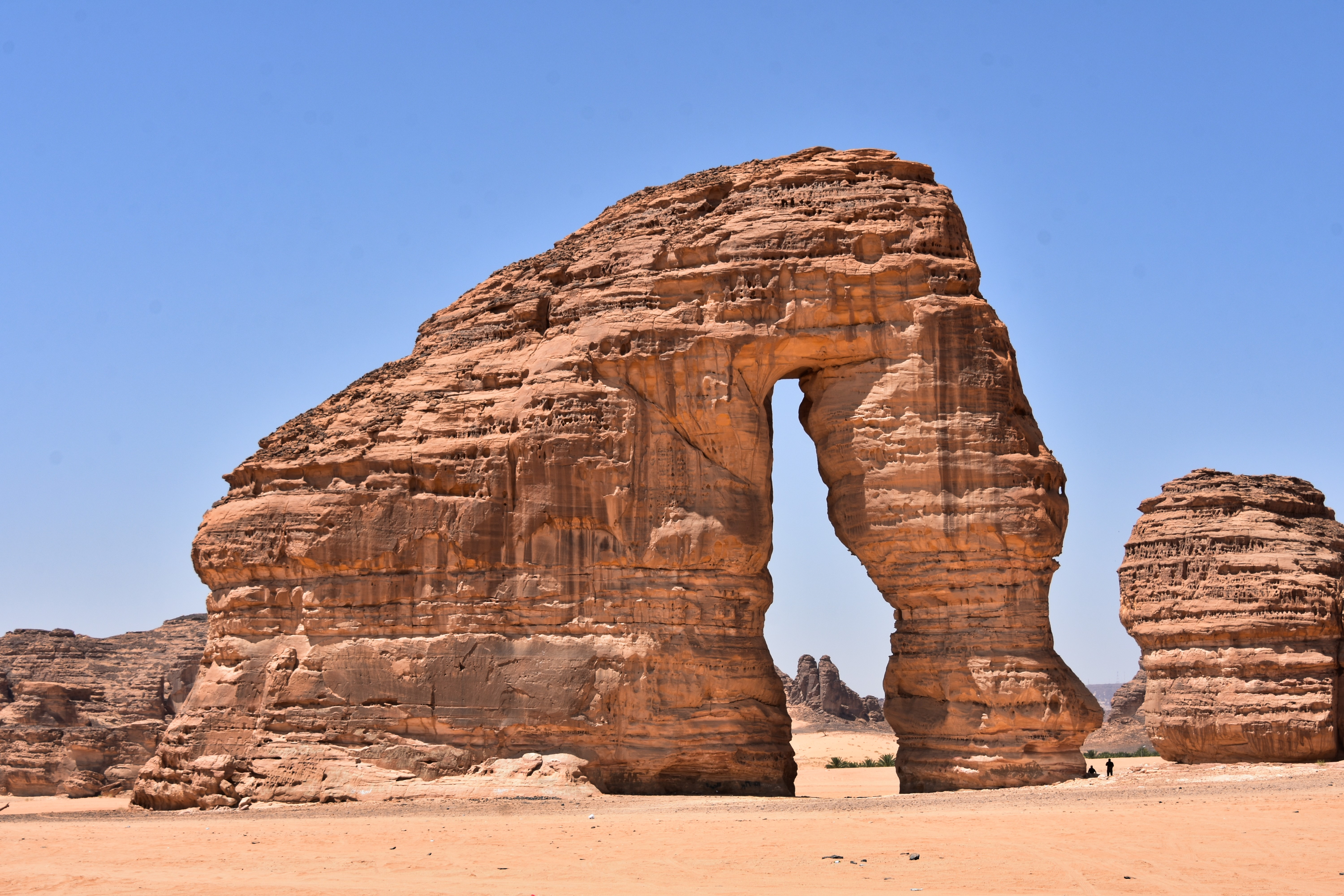
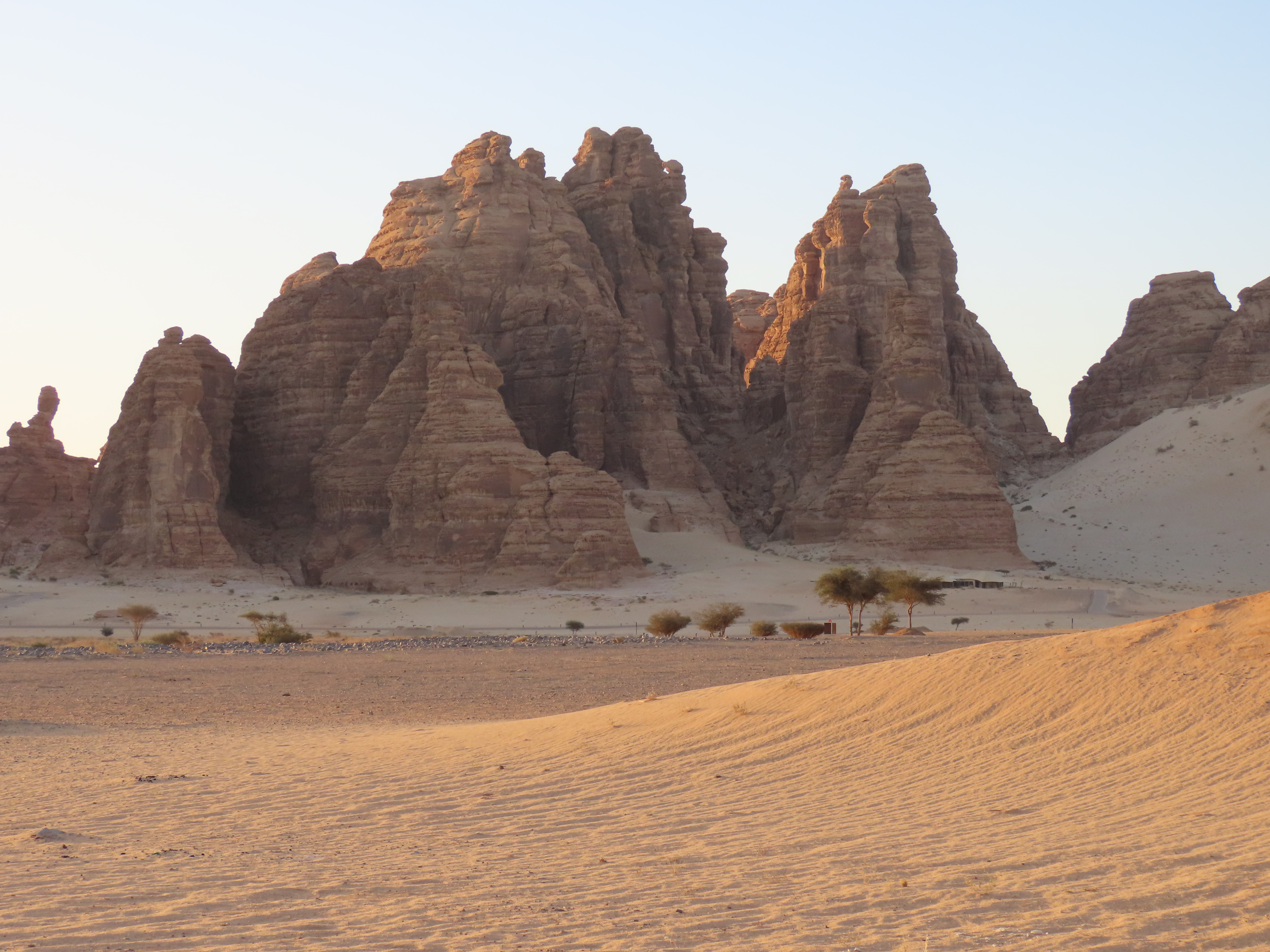
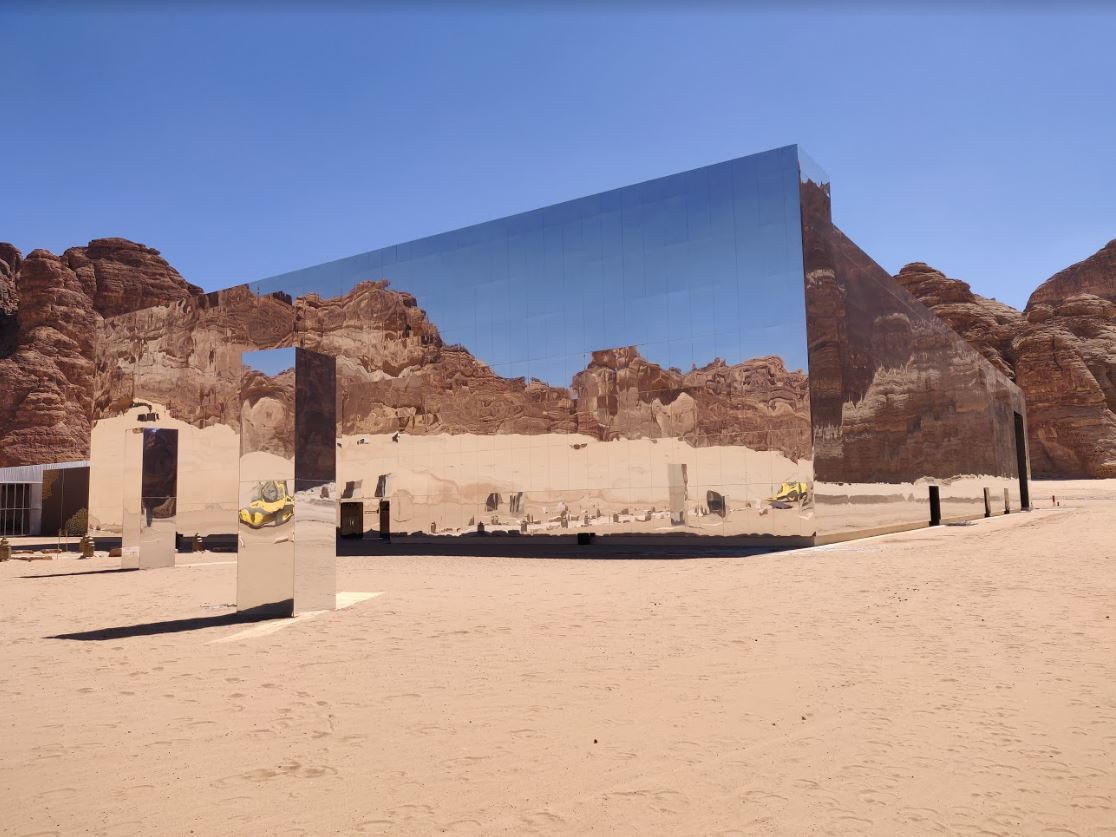
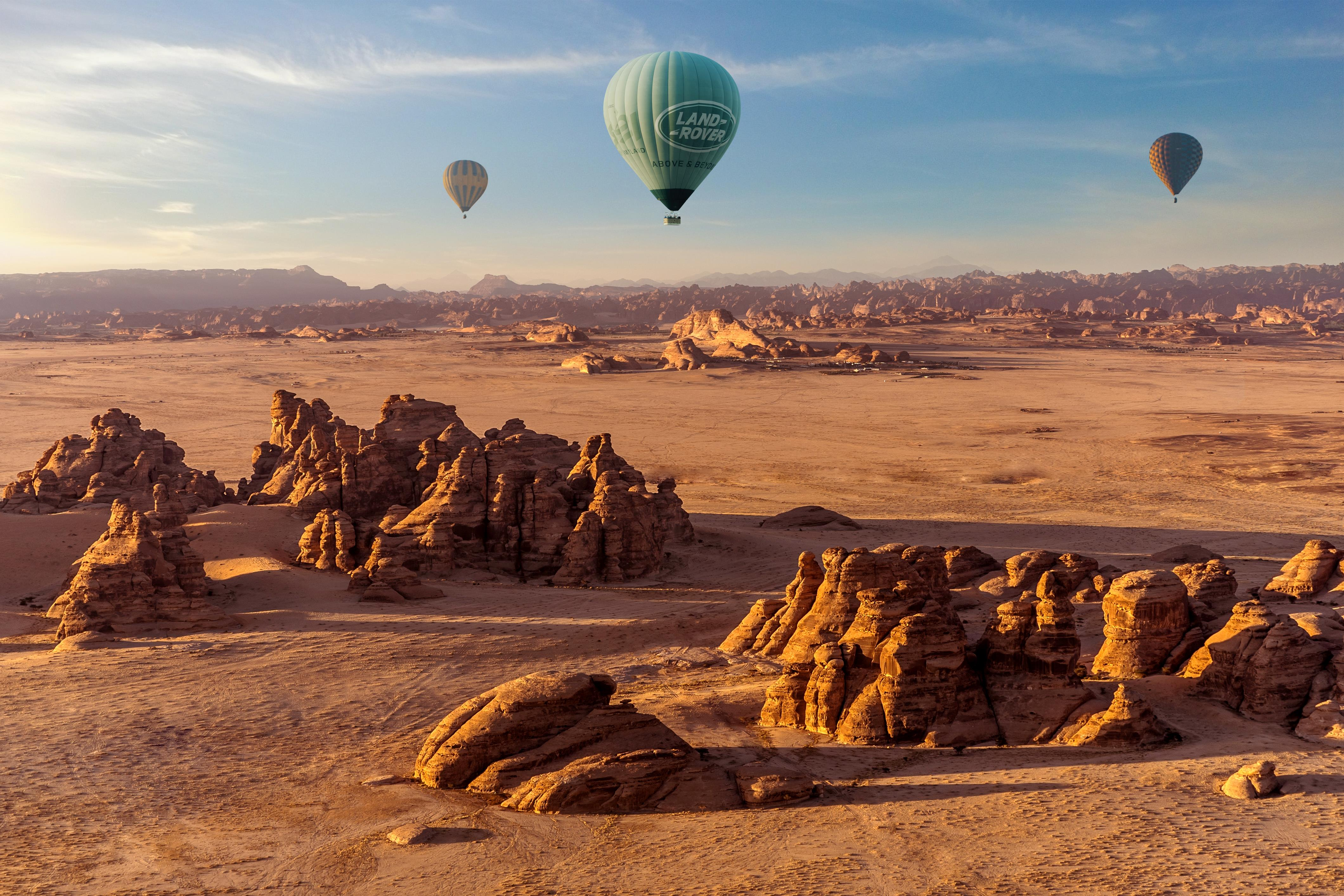
- Aerial view of the city Old Town The Elephant Rock Wadi Ashar Maraya Concert Hall AlUla hot air balloon

- Seal Wordmark

- Location of al-Ula within Medina Province

- Location of al-Ula within Saudi Arabia al-Ula (Asia) al-Ula (Earth)
- Coordinates: 26°36′32″N 37°55′25″E
- Country: Saudi Arabia
- Province: Medina Province
- Region: Hejaz
- Governorate: al-Ula

Government
  - Type: Royal Commission
  - Body: Royal Commission for al-Ula
  - Governor of al-Ula: Bader bin Abdullah

Area
  - Total: 22,561 km^{2} (8,711 sq mi)
- Elevation: 692 m (2,270 ft)

Population (2022)
  - Total: 60,103
  - Density: 2.6640/km^{2} (6.8998/sq mi)
- Time zone: UTC+03:00 (SAST)
- Postal Code: (5 digits)
- Area code: 014
- HDI (2021): 0.875 – very high
- Website: www.experiencealula.com/en

UNESCO World Heritage Site
- Official name: Hegra Archaeological Site (al-Hijr / Madā ͐ in Ṣāliḥ)
- Type: Cultural
- Criteria: ii, iii
- Designated: 2008 (32nd session)
- Reference no.: 1293
- Region: the Arab States

al-Ula (Arabic: ٱلْعُلَا, romanized: al-ʿUlā), officially AlUla, is an ancient Arabian oasis city and governorate located in Medina Province, Saudi Arabia, 350 kilometres (220 miles) northwest of the city of Medina. Situated in the Hejaz, a region that features prominently in the history of Islam as well as several pre-Islamic Semitic civilizations, al-Ula was a market city on the historic incense trade route that linked India and the Persian Gulf to the Levant and Europe.

From an archaeological perspective, the immediate vicinity contains a unique concentration of precious artifacts, including well-preserved ancient stone inscriptions that illustrate the development of the Arabic language, and a concentration of rock dwellings and tombs that date from the Nabatean and Dedanite periods that coincided with Greco-Roman influence during classical antiquity. Saudi Arabia's first UNESCO World Heritage Site, Hegra (also known as al-Hijr, or Mada'in Ṣalih), is located 22 km (14 miles) north of the city, in al-Ula governorate. Built more than 2,000 years ago by the Nabataeans, Hegra is often compared with its sister city of Petra, in Jordan. Meanwhile, the ancient walled oasis city of al-Ula, locally known as al-Dirah, situated near the oasis's palm grove that allowed for its settlement, contains a dense cluster of mudbrick and stone houses. al-Ula was also the capital of the ancient Lihyanites (Dedanites).

The Jabal Ikmah epigraphs and petroglyphs are located in the mountains around al-Ula. In 2023, they have been inscribed on the UNESCO Memory of the World International Register. Dating back to the second half of the first millennium BCE, they played a significant role in the evolution of Old Arabic languages and dialects. Carved in sandstone, these nearly 300 inscriptions are written in the pre-Nabataean Arabic languages Aramaic, Dadanitic, Thamudic, and Minaic.

Today, the city of al-Ula is within the Governorate of al-Ula, one of seven constituent counties of Medina province. The city is located 110 km (68 miles) southwest of Tayma and 300 km (190 miles) north of Medina. The city (municipality) covers 2,391 square kilometres (923 sq mi), and has a population of 60,103 as of 2022. In addition to the ancient old town al-Dīrah, a more recent historical and adjacent settlement, al-Judaydah, displaying the settlement patterns of Arabic-Islamic urbanism, remains occupied and is currently experiencing a redesign. Since the 1980s, the oasis of al-Ula has experienced significant agricultural and urban growth. Since then, the settled Bedouins have been added to the population of Sedentary people and, as in the rest of the kingdom, a large population of immigrant workers.

The area is also known for its striking landscape of rocks, canyons, and wadis, and the contrast between these dry surroundings and the lush, palm-filled oases near the city's centre. The oasis of al-Ula was once a key stop on the Hejaz railway, linking Damascus to Medina.

== Landscape ==
The vertical sandstone cliffs surrounding the valley provide ample surfaces for rock art, making the governorate one of the richer petroglyph regions in the Kingdom. Ar-Ruzeiqiah is a mountain in the southern part of the governorate, with a large petroglyph panel displaying hundreds of images, including depictions of hunting scenes with humans and a variety of animals. Ibex are the most common species but camels, horses and other species can also be found. Mount Ikma also has a large façade with scenes, strange symbols, and inscriptions.

== History ==
=== Prehistory ===
The oasis of al-Ula has had permanent human settlement since 5000 BCE, through the Bronze Age.

=== Pre-Islamic times ===
The walled city of al-Ula was founded as an oasis in the desert valley, with fertile soil and plenty of water. It was located along the incense trade route, the network of routes that facilitated the trading of spices, silk and other luxury items through the Kingdom of Aksum, Arabia, Egypt, and India. The oasis of al-Ula stands on the site of the Biblical city of Dedan but was founded with the ancient North Arabian kingdom of Lihyan, which ruled from the 5th to 2nd century BCE.

The older history of the oasis has been divided into several phases. The Dedanite kingdom spans the 7th and 6th centuries BCE. Dedan is mentioned in the Harran Stela. In these it is told how Nabonidus, last ruler of the Neo-Babylonian Empire, made a military campaign to northern Arabia in 552 BCE or somewhat later, conquering Tayma, Dedan, and Yathrib (now Medina). It is thought that around the turn of the 5th century BCE, the kingdom became hereditary.

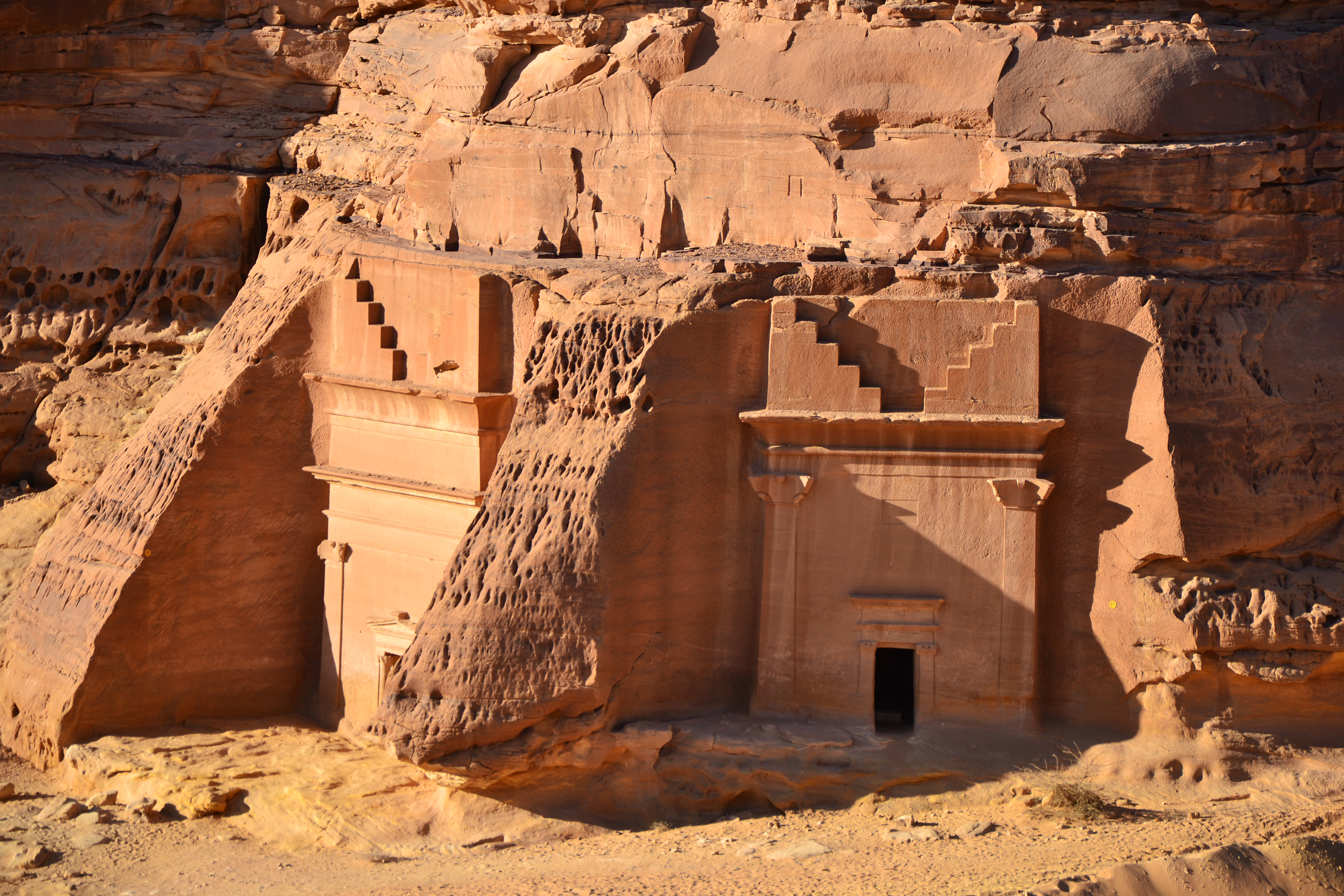
Multiple Nabataean tombs from the Madain Saleh necropolis

The next four hundred years, until around 100 BCE, was the period of Lihyanite kingdom. The Nabataeans were also the lords of the region at least until 106 CE, when the Roman Empire conquered and annexed it in their Arabia Petraea province.

=== Medieval Islamic times ===
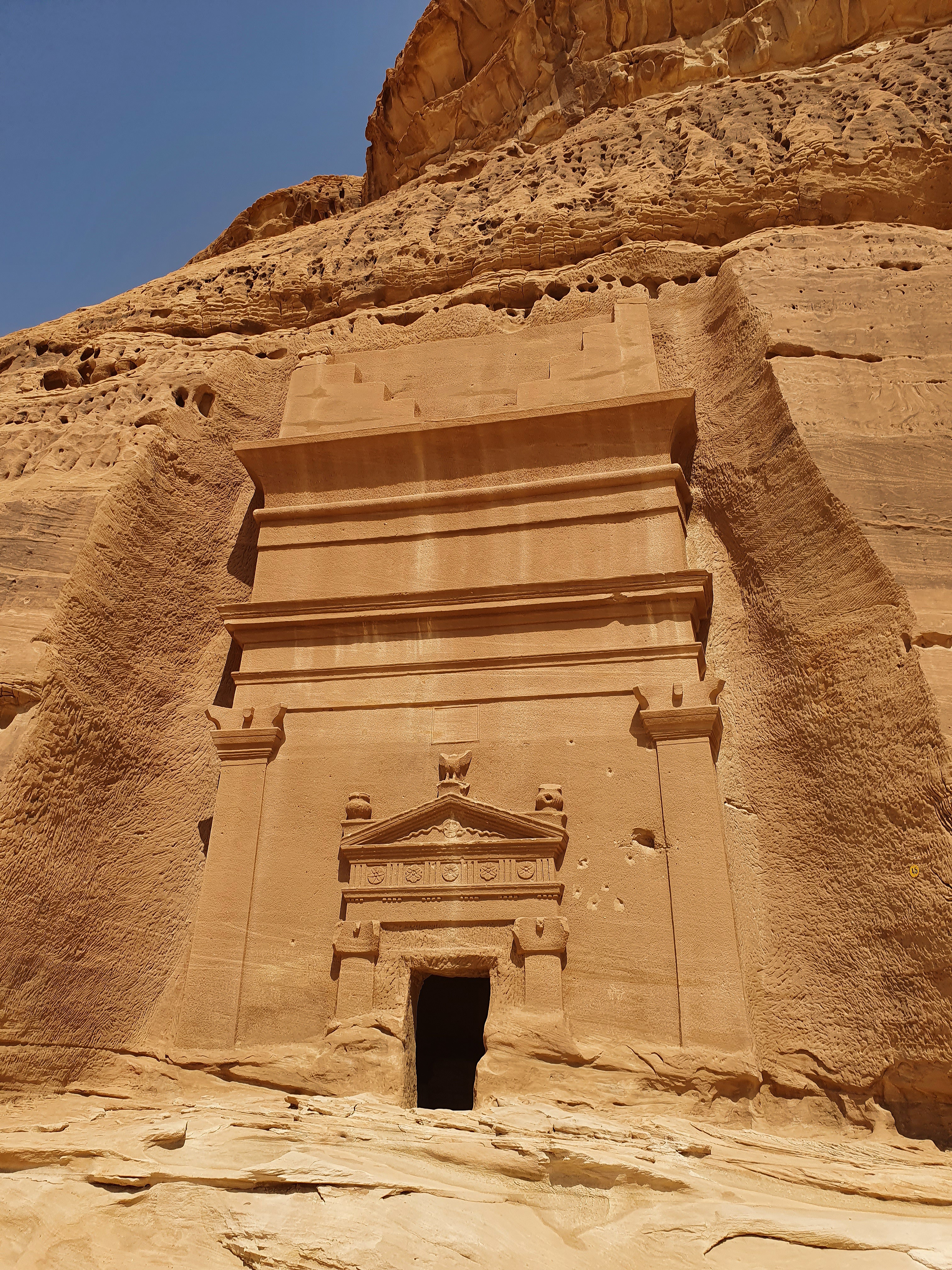
Hegra (Madain Salih), tomb in Qasr al-Bint (Arabic: قصر البنت) necropolis

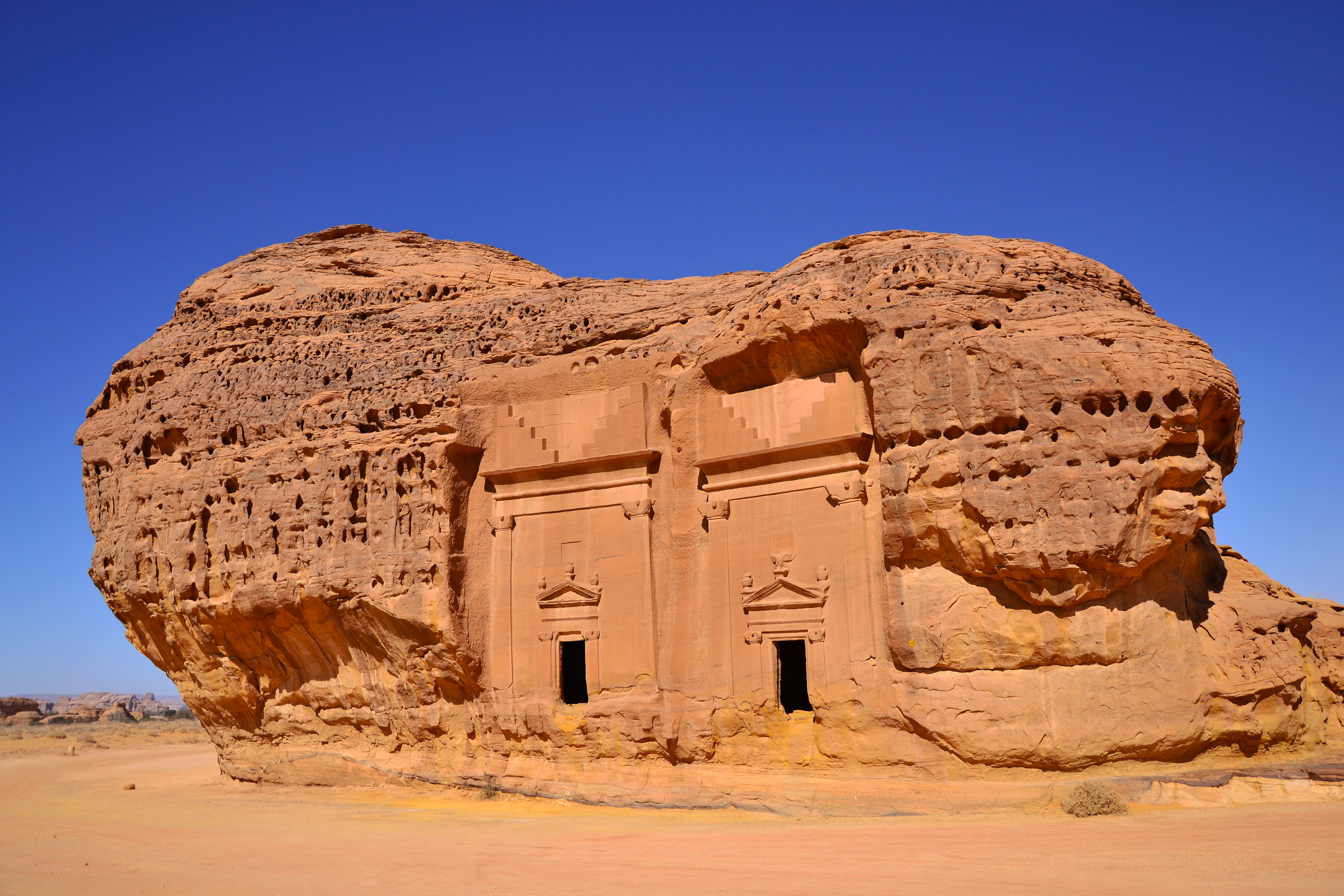
Arabic: جبل البنات, romanized: Jabal Al-Banāt, Mada'in Saleh

Al-Mabiyat, some 20 km (12 miles) away near Mughayrah became the next commercial centre of the region. It thrived from around 650 CE until it declined at some time before 1230. In the 13th century, the old city of al-Ula, locally known as al-Dīrah, was built, and many stones of the old Dedanite and Lihyanite ruins were reused.

=== Modern times ===
The oasis of al-Ula now became the major settlement of the region again until modern times. Between 1901 and 1908 the Ottomans built the Hejaz railway in order to link Damascus to Medina. The railway had main stations in both Madā'in Ṣaliḥ (Hegra) and al-Ula, where a line was built through the western part of al-Khuraybah, some 12 km (7.5 miles) to the north of the old medieval town, which is believed to be the site of the old Dedanite and Lihyanite town that is still standing there despite being in bad shape.

In the 20th century, the new town centre was established beside the old town, and eventually, the people left the old buildings. The last family is said to have gone in 1983, while the last service in the old mosque was held in 1985. Both the ruins of the medieval town al-Dīrah and the site of the Liyhanite settlement now lie within the limits of the modern town.

=== Timeline ===
The following is the sequence of historical events and the ancient evidence found in the al-Ula governorate:

History	Evidence
Bronze Age	1. Bronze Age evidence in Al-Hijr; 2. Archaeological site – Tumulus tombs dates C14 2113/1892 BC
Ancient North Arabian Kingdoms (DEDAN)	1. Capital city 2. Water management and development of agriculture (date palm introduced); 3. Prosperity from incense trade to Mesopotamia; 4. Ancient North Arabian scripts (Jabal Ikma)
Nabataean Kingdom (Hegra)	1. Functioned as the southern capital 2. Intricate carved tomb facades 3. Water management 4. Prosperity from incense trade to the Mediterranean
Roman presence	1. Fort at Hegra; 2. Southernmost limit of Roman Empire
Islamic period (QURH, al-Ula)	1. Prosperity from trade and pilgrimage 2. Water management
Ottoman presence	1. Hijaz railway with several halts in the region to modernize pilgrim travel 2. Forts to protect pilgrim travel

AlUla joined the UNESCO Global Network of Learning Cities in 2025.

== Archaeological investigations ==
The most detailed study of the area was made by the French priests Antonin Jaussen and Raphaël Savignac, who visited the area three times, in 1907, 1908 and 1910. They studied the remains at Hegra and Dedan and collected a large number of Lihyanite, Minaean, Thamudic, and Nabataean inscriptions. Accordingly, it was their work that came to constitute the basis for all further study and research in the area's history.

The first European traveller of modern times to describe the town was Charles Doughty in 1876. Charles Huber was in al-Ula in 1881–1882. He returned in 1883 accompanied by Julius Euting. In 1968 a team of archaeologists from the University of London investigated 15 inscriptions.

== Rock art ==
The rock art of the AlUla region represents one of the most extensive and chronologically deep corpora in northern Arabia, spanning over 12,000 years from the early Holocene to the recent past. Documented through the Identification and Documentation of Immovable Heritage Assets (IDIHA) Project (2018–2021), which systematically surveyed approximately 1,000 km^{2} (390 sq mi) around the AlUla valley and oases, the survey recorded 19,802 identifiable rock art panels containing tens of thousands of individual motifs, predominantly engravings (with only 143 painted panels).

The majority of the corpus are engravings, and more rarely, through incisions. Over 100 paintings have been documented, mostly done in red pigment, often depicting architectural or tent-like structures. The most common motif found in them are of animals, followed by human figures and, most rarely, plants, objects, and structures. Animals appear in interactive scenes such as hunting, herding, and battles, but most commonly, as isolated figures.

The rock art is divided into broad chronological phases:

- Early Holocene (~10,000 BCE onward): Rare but distinctive life-sized, highly naturalistic engravings of wild fauna (e.g., wild camels, African wild ass/equids with shoulder stripes, ibex, aurochs), often detailed with eyes, muscles, and coat patterns; no human figures or interactions; clustered near water sources along escarpments.
- Pre-Neolithic/Neolithic (broadly Holocene humid period, ~8000–4000 BCE): Medium-sized, stylized depictions in the "Jubbah style" tradition, including hunting scenes with bows, arrows, dogs, and prey (equids, lesser kudu, gazelles); iconic long-horned cattle (lyre-shaped or forward-pointing horns, often with coat/geometric markings or hoof-prints); rare sheep/goat; human figures mostly simple stick forms (Jubbah-style conventions known but infrequently applied); predator conflicts (e.g., lions attacking herds); ibex dominant symbolically.
- Bronze Age (early 3rd millennium BCE onward): Sparse and harder to identify; limited markers include human figures with lunate pommel daggers and "bracket-like" or "lizard-like" postures; occasional stylized cattle; lighter varnish accumulation.
- Iron Age to pre-Islamic (1200 BCE–6th century CE) and post-Islamic periods (7th century CE–modern): Small, stylized engravings lacking heavy varnish; massive emphasis on domesticated camels (over 50% of identifiable animals, often with riders, hobbled, or in herds; raiding/hunting scenes); horses with riders (far more frequent than camels in battle contexts, reflecting prestige); ibex hunting with dogs; ostrich motifs (hunting, possible herding, eggs); rare cattle persistence in oases; battle scenes, herding, carnivore conflicts (lions, leopards, etc.); riders on horseback/camelback; objects (e.g., firearms, motor vehicles, coffee pots) in later phases; Ancient North Arabian scripts often associated.

Overall, early rock art reflects wetter conditions with wild fauna and pastoralism, whereas in the late rock art, we see a depiction of arid adaptation, oasis settlement, camel/horse domestication, trade routes, warfare, and hunting/herding. Ibex remain prominent across periods, whereas cattle sharpyl decline in the post-Neolithic period. The AlUla corpus is thought to rival the major northern Arabian sites, like Jubbah and Shuwaymis, and are an end-product of the place of AlUla as a cultural and an economic hub across the desert trade networks.

== Administration ==
There are four major municipalities in the Governorate of al-Ula: al-Ula, the capital lying to the southwest (population 5,426); Mughayrāʾ (Arabic: مُغِيْرَاء) to the southeast (population 8,952); Abu Raku, to the north (population 2,678); and al-Ḥijr to the northeast (population 1,707).

=== Heritage Village ===
al-Ula Heritage Village, also known as Al-Dīrah, is the traditional Arabian village to which people of the oasis moved some eight centuries ago and inhabited until the 20th century. It was built on a higher part of the valley in order to be clear of the floods that can occur during the rainy season. At its maximum expansion the town contained more than 1000 houses, which were built adjacent to one another, thereby forming a wall around the town to defend the population. On the west of the town, at the bottom of the cliff, is the old souq, which has been renovated.

=== Royal Commission for al-Ula ===
The importance of al-Ula as an archaeological and historic site led to the establishment of The Royal Commission for al-Ula (RCU) in July 2017, the aim of which is to develop and promote al-Ula as an international tourism destination. Moreover, the commission develops the plans for heritage conservation and preservation. The Royal commission for al-Ula, along with al-Ula Development Company, have taken various development projects in the region, including the five districts planned for al-Ula by 2030. The five districts include: al-Ula old town, Dadan, Jabal Ikmah, Nabataeane Horizen, and Hegra Historical City. These five districts are part of a larger development plan for al-Ula that further aims to transform the city into a world-class tourist destination while also preserving its cultural and historical heritage.

=== Development plan ===
To promote tourism and gain more attraction, the Royal Commission for al-Ula is training 200 young Saudis on a project where tourists will explore the area's cultural treasures. Recruited from the al-Ula region, the 200 young people (all high-school aged or in their first year as university students, split equally between boys and girls) are in Riyadh, being trained in hospitality, learning new languages, studying farming and water technology, and researching the cultural, social and natural history of their home region.

In January 2023, the Public Investment Fund launched Al-Ula Development Company, a hospitality and real estate developer which aims to turn al-Ula into a global tourist destination.

=== al-Ula International Airport ===
The Airport was a crucial part of the development strategy of the Royal Commission for al-Ula, which envisioned making it a global destination for culture and tourism. In March 2021, the airport was approved to receive international flights, along with an increased capacity of receiving 15 commercial flights at a time. The capacity was increased from 100,000 to 400,000 passengers per year.

== Tourism ==
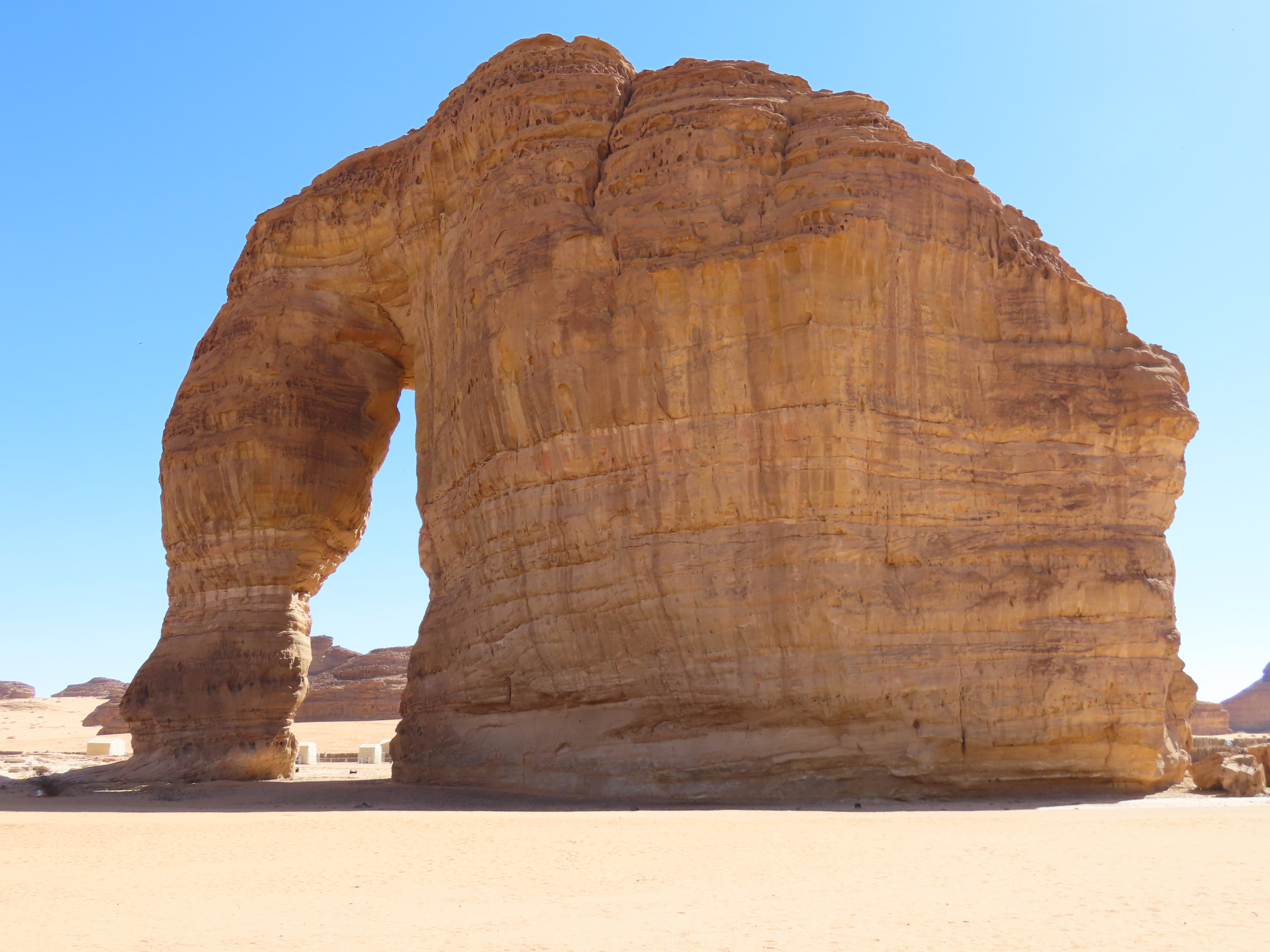
The Iconic Elephant Rock in al-Ula

The Saudi Arabian government is collaborating with experts from around the world on the al-Ula development. In April 2018 it signed a 10-year deal with France that included provisions for hotels, transport infrastructure and a world-class culture and art museum. Since 2021, the Royal Commission of al-Ula has been running SME accelerator in collaboration with AstroLabs to ensure growth of the local tourism ecosystem. With this program, the region has set out on an ambitious mission to welcome 2 million tourists and contribute SAR 120Bn to the national GDP by 2030.

A major integrated archaeological survey of al-Ula valley and beyond was launched by the commission, charged with protecting and regenerating the north-western region. While a conservation and development plan was established, some of the sites including the World Heritage Site of Madā'in Ṣaliḥ were closed to the public, but have been open since 2020 for visitors.

With the easing of visa process for international travelers, al-Ula attracts more tourists from abroad. Its most popular sites are: al-Ula Old town, Oasis Heritage Trail, Hegra UNESCO Heritage Site, Dadan, Jabal Ikmah, Jabal AlFil (Elephant Rock), Harrarat Viewpoint or Maraya Concert Hall. Travelers from around the world can also enjoy numerous of activities such as stargazing, desert dune bashing, desert campaign, hiking, biking, rock climbing, via ferrata and others.

AlUla has also inspired works of contemporary design and luxury branding. In 2024, the British perfume house Penhaligon's introduced AlUla, a fragrance inspired by the region's dramatic desert landscapes, oasis, and rich cultural heritage.

=== Accommodation in al-Ula ===
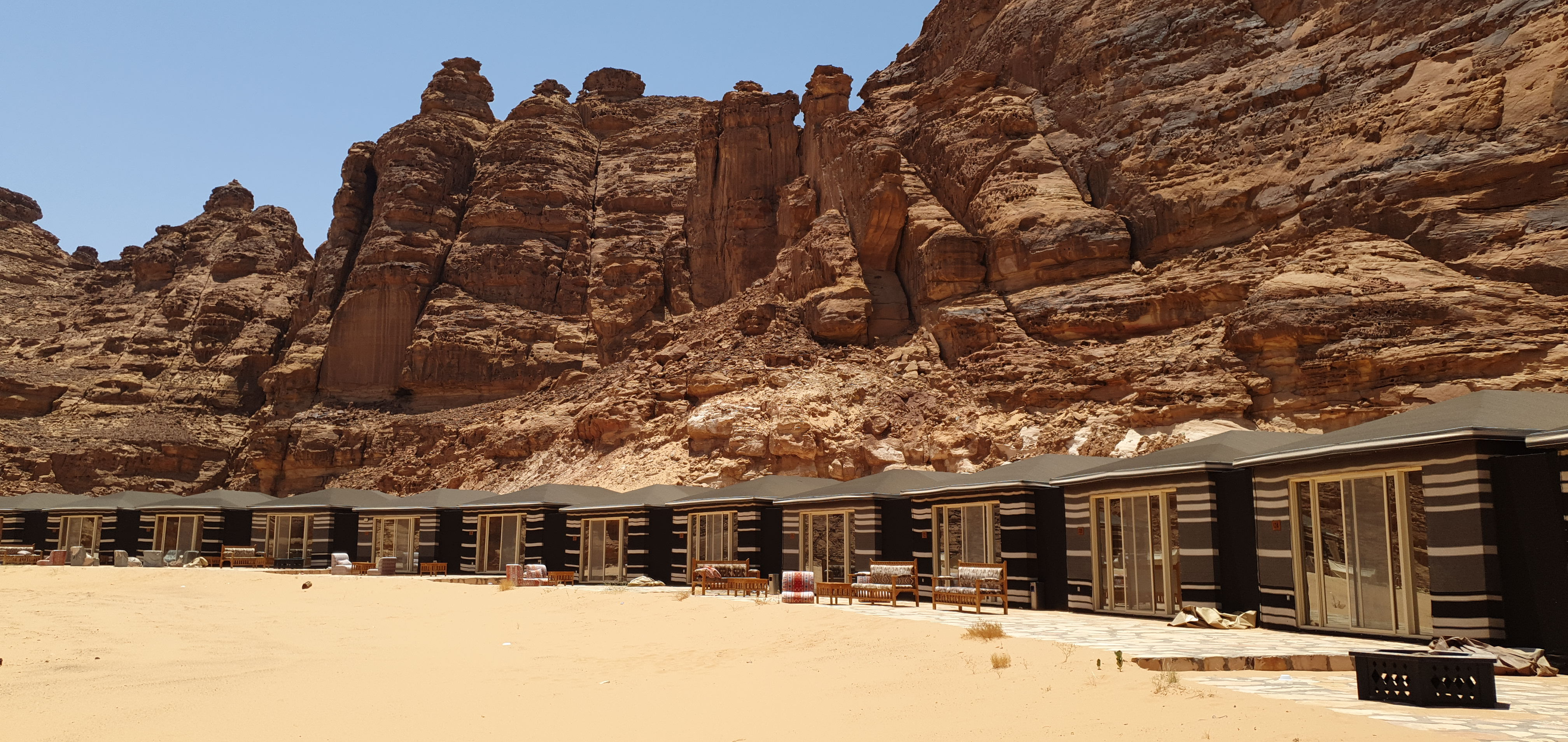
Shaden Resort, 2020

As the tourism infrastructure, aiming at tourism de luxe, is still being developed in al-Ula, finding affordable accommodation can be a challenge during high season. Tourists have a variety of options ranging from camping sites, holiday homes (apartments or chalets) to luxury resorts. As of 2023, al-Ula is home to 10 luxury resorts and accommodations available for visitors of the old city.

=== "Winter at Tantora" festival ===
Winter at Tantora was a traditional celebration to mark the start of the 40-day winter growing season. The name of the festival, 'Tantora', is inspired by a sundial located in the Old Town of al-Ula, which has been in use by the locals as a marker for the changing of the seasons. On 20 December 2018, the first "Winter at Tantora" started with a series of different themed weekend events including music, arts, entertainment, and cultural events. The concerts were performed in Maraya Concert Hall, which was newly design and constructed by Giò Forma Studio and Black Engineering for this purpose, and whose external walls are covered with mirrors, maraya being the Arabic word for 'mirrors'. A second edition of Winter at Tantora Festival was held on 19 December 2019, and included performances by Omar Khairat, EBI "Ebrahim hamedi", Andrea Bocelli, Yanni, Enrique Iglesias, and Lionel Richie.

On 26 December 2019, Maraya Concert Hall set a Guinness World Record for the largest mirrored building in the world, in which it was covered by 9,740 square metres (104,800 sq ft) of mirrored façade.

=== Azimuth Festival ===
As part of the "Winter at Tantora" festival, Saudi Arabia hosted a three-day festival of music, art and food. Held between 5–7 March 2020, the Azimuth Festival was an event that brought the east and west together at al-Ula. It marked performances from artists like the Chainsmokers, Jean-Michel Jarre, Tinie Tempah and others. The event took place at the beginning of the COVID-19 pandemic and so received little publicity.

=== Persian Night in Saudi Arabia's al-Ula ===
From 6 to 7 March 2020, a large concert of Iranian singers was held at the winter celebration of the Kingdom of Saudi Arabia in the city of al-Ula. Ebi, Leila Forouhar, Shahram Shabpareh, Shadmehr Aghili, Andy (Andranik Madadian), Arash, and Sasy were present at the concert.

=== al-Ula Vision ===
On 11 February 2019, Saudi Arabia's Crown Prince Mohammed bin Salman launched the al-Ula vision which features a resort and nature reserve called Sharaan. The vision also includes the establishment of the Global Fund for the protection and revitalization of the Arabian leopard. al-Ula provides an opportunity for numerous international companies to benefit from the ambitious plans. Some notable companies are already working on and benefiting from the al-Ula project: AECOM, JAL International, Nesma & Partners, Alstom, KUN Investment Holding and others.

== Climate ==
Climate data for al-Ula (Prince Abdul Majeed bin Abdulaziz International Airport) (1991–2020)
Month	Jan	Feb	Mar	Apr	May	Jun	Jul	Aug	Sep	Oct	Nov	Dec	Year
Record high °C (°F)	29.2 (84.6)	32.2 (90.0)	38.3 (100.9)	41.8 (107.2)	43.8 (110.8)	47.1 (116.8)	47.5 (117.5)	47.3 (117.1)	45.9 (114.6)	42.4 (108.3)	35.2 (95.4)	30.9 (87.6)	47.5 (117.5)
Mean daily maximum °C (°F)	20.0 (68.0)	24.3 (75.7)	28.6 (83.5)	33.3 (91.9)	38.5 (101.3)	41.3 (106.3)	43.0 (109.4)	42.1 (107.8)	42.0 (107.6)	36.9 (98.4)	28.3 (82.9)	24.4 (75.9)	33.6 (92.5)
Daily mean °C (°F)	13.4 (56.1)	17.2 (63.0)	22.0 (71.6)	26.1 (79.0)	31.3 (88.3)	34.5 (94.1)	36.1 (97.0)	35.1 (95.2)	35.5 (95.9)	30.0 (86.0)	22.0 (71.6)	17.7 (63.9)	26.8 (80.2)
Mean daily minimum °C (°F)	6.3 (43.3)	9.3 (48.7)	15.3 (59.5)	19.0 (66.2)	23.7 (74.7)	27.0 (80.6)	29.3 (84.7)	28.1 (82.6)	27.7 (81.9)	21.4 (70.5)	16.1 (61.0)	11.9 (53.4)	19.6 (67.3)
Record low °C (°F)	2.0 (35.6)	4.0 (39.2)	7.3 (45.1)	11.4 (52.5)	16.9 (62.4)	20.6 (69.1)	24.2 (75.6)	24.7 (76.5)	20.1 (68.2)	16.9 (62.4)	9.0 (48.2)	5.4 (41.7)	2.0 (35.6)
Average precipitation mm (inches)	3.7 (0.15)	0.0 (0.0)	19.0 (0.75)	0.0 (0.0)	0.0 (0.0)	0.0 (0.0)	1.5 (0.06)	0.0 (0.0)	0.5 (0.02)	0.0 (0.0)	26.3 (1.04)	9.9 (0.39)	60.9 (2.40)
Average precipitation days (≥ 1.0 mm)	1.0	0.0	1.0	0.0	0.0	0.0	0.0	0.0	0.0	0.0	2.0	1.0	5.0
Source 1: NOAA
Source 2: Meteomanz (extremes since 2021)

== Gallery ==
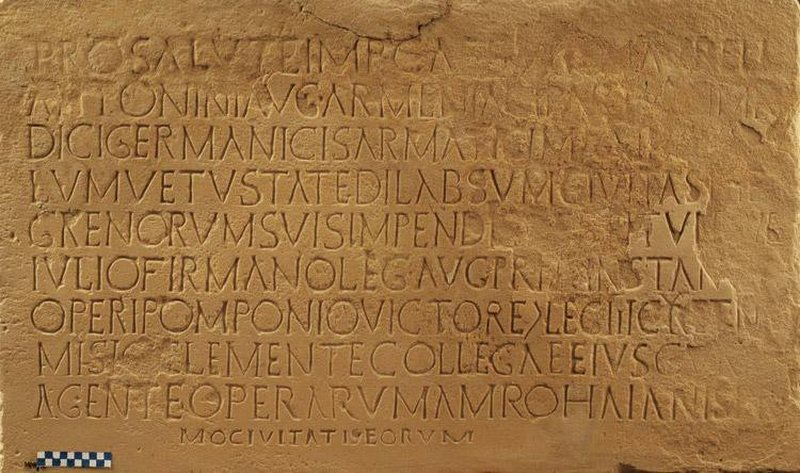
Hegra Roman inscription dedicated to Emperor Marcus Aurelius

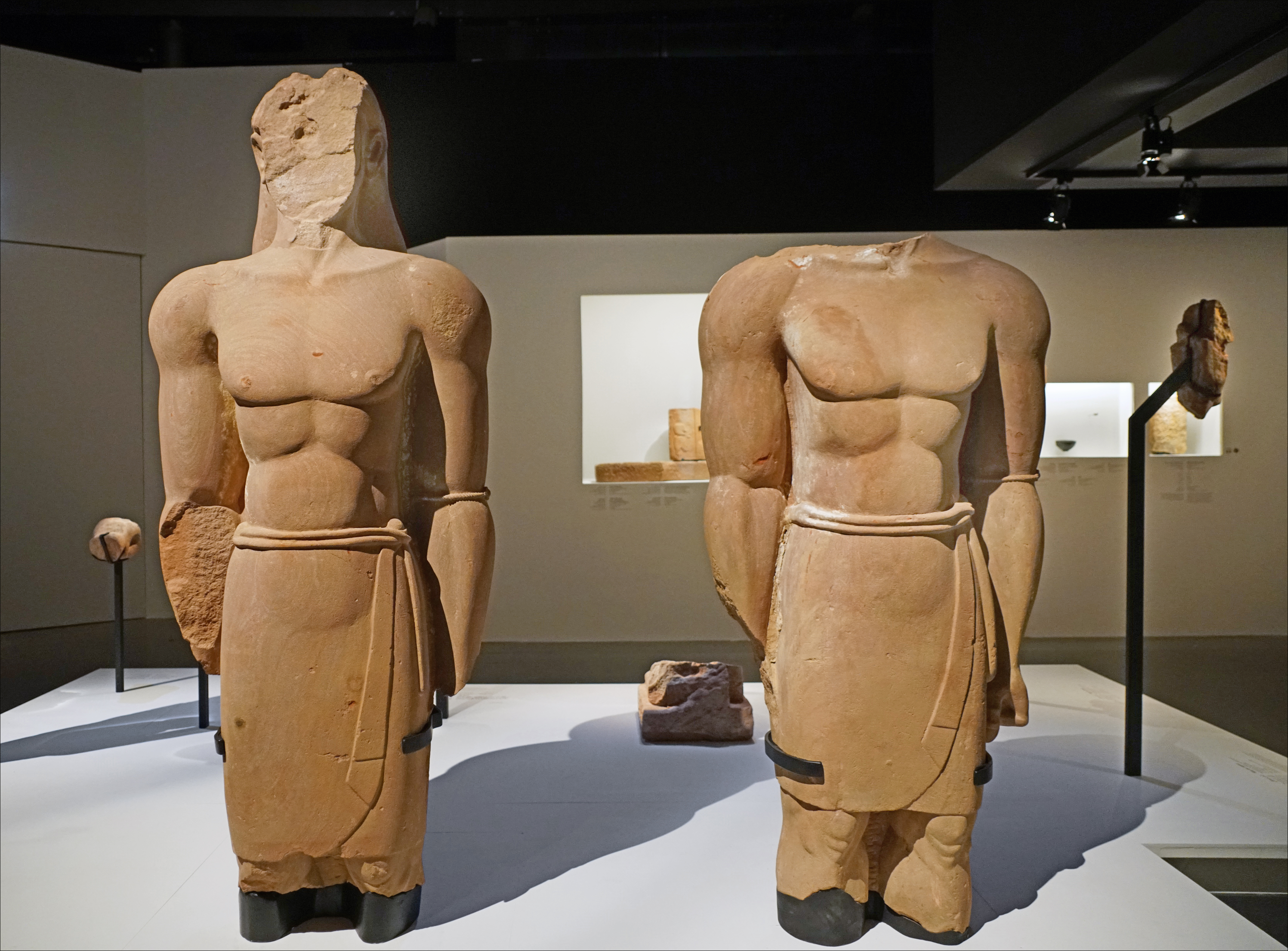
Two colossal statues from the sanctuary of Dadān/al-Khuraybah, possibly figurative representations of Lihyanite kings

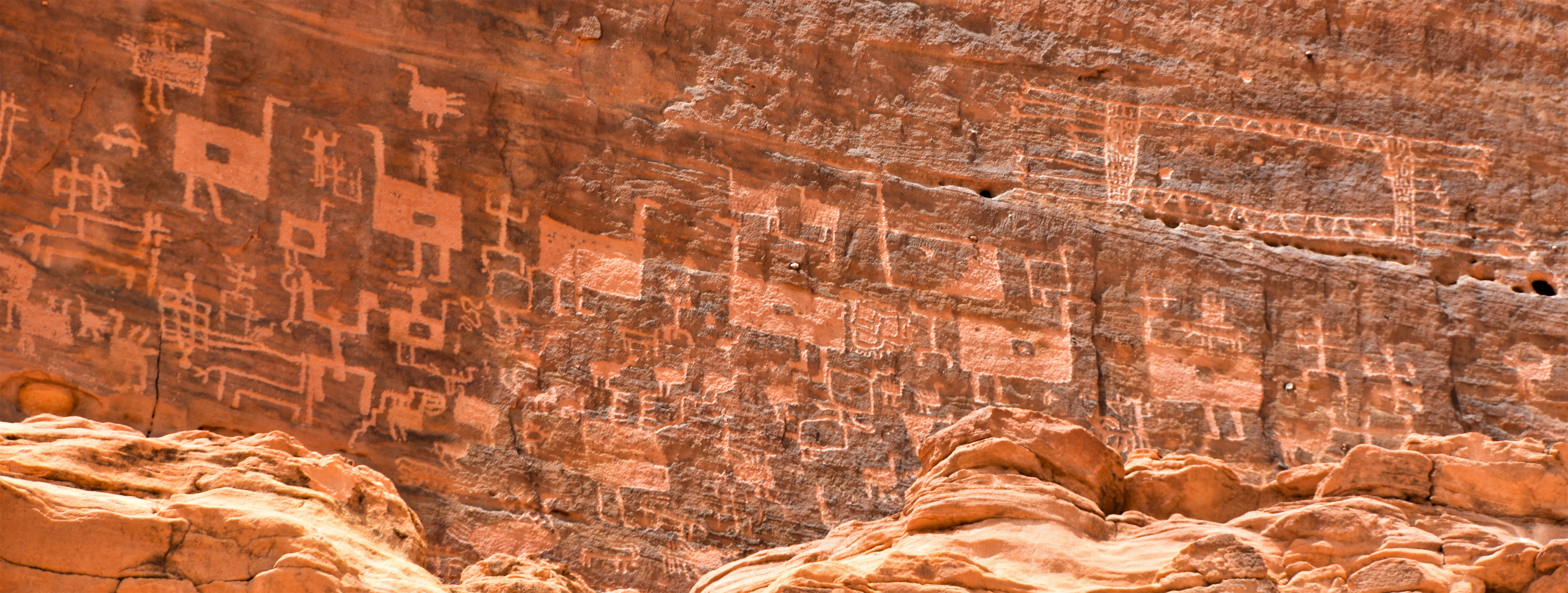
Petroglyphs with human figures, ostriches and dogs

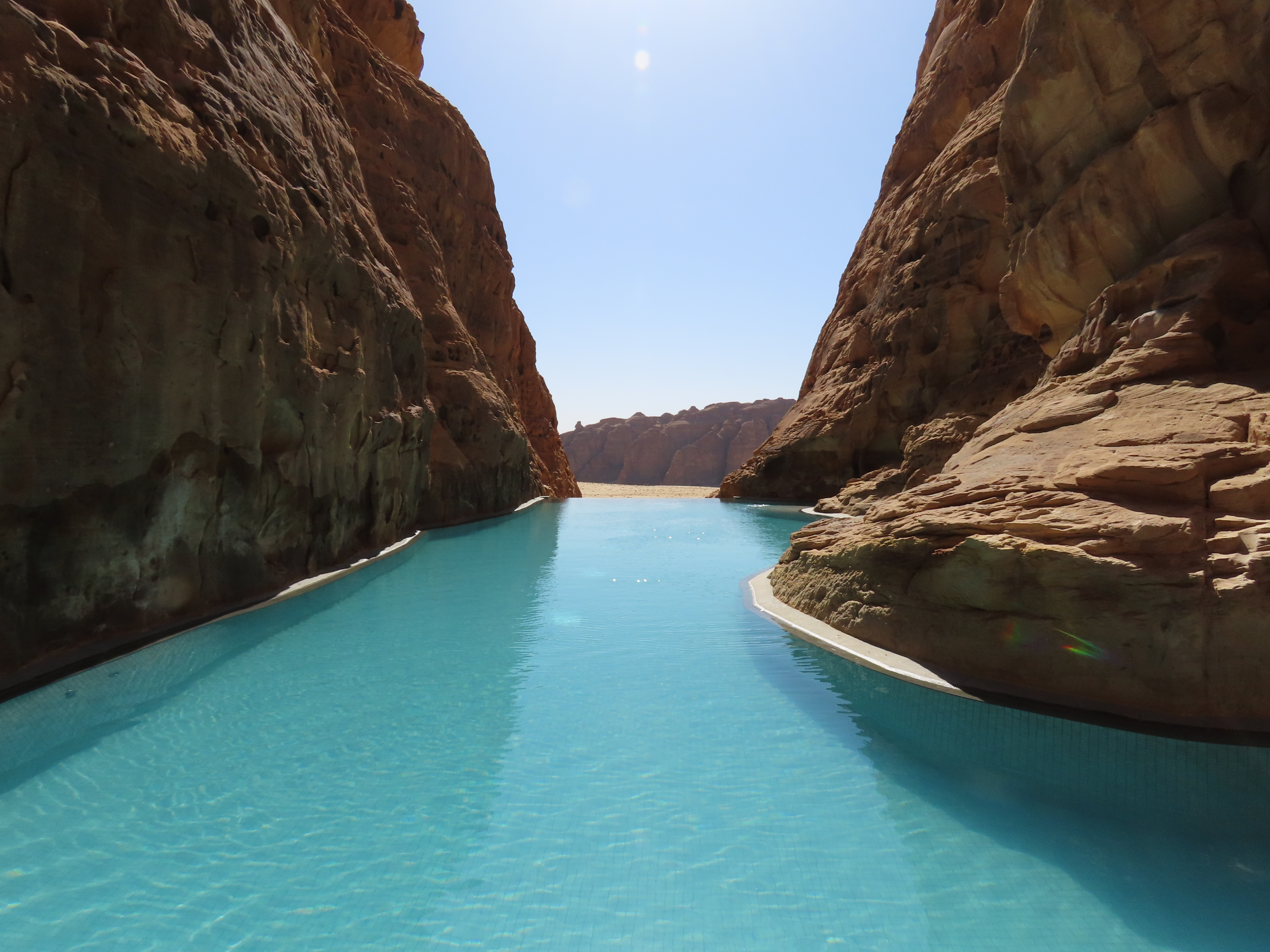
Rock pool at Banyan Tree AlUla

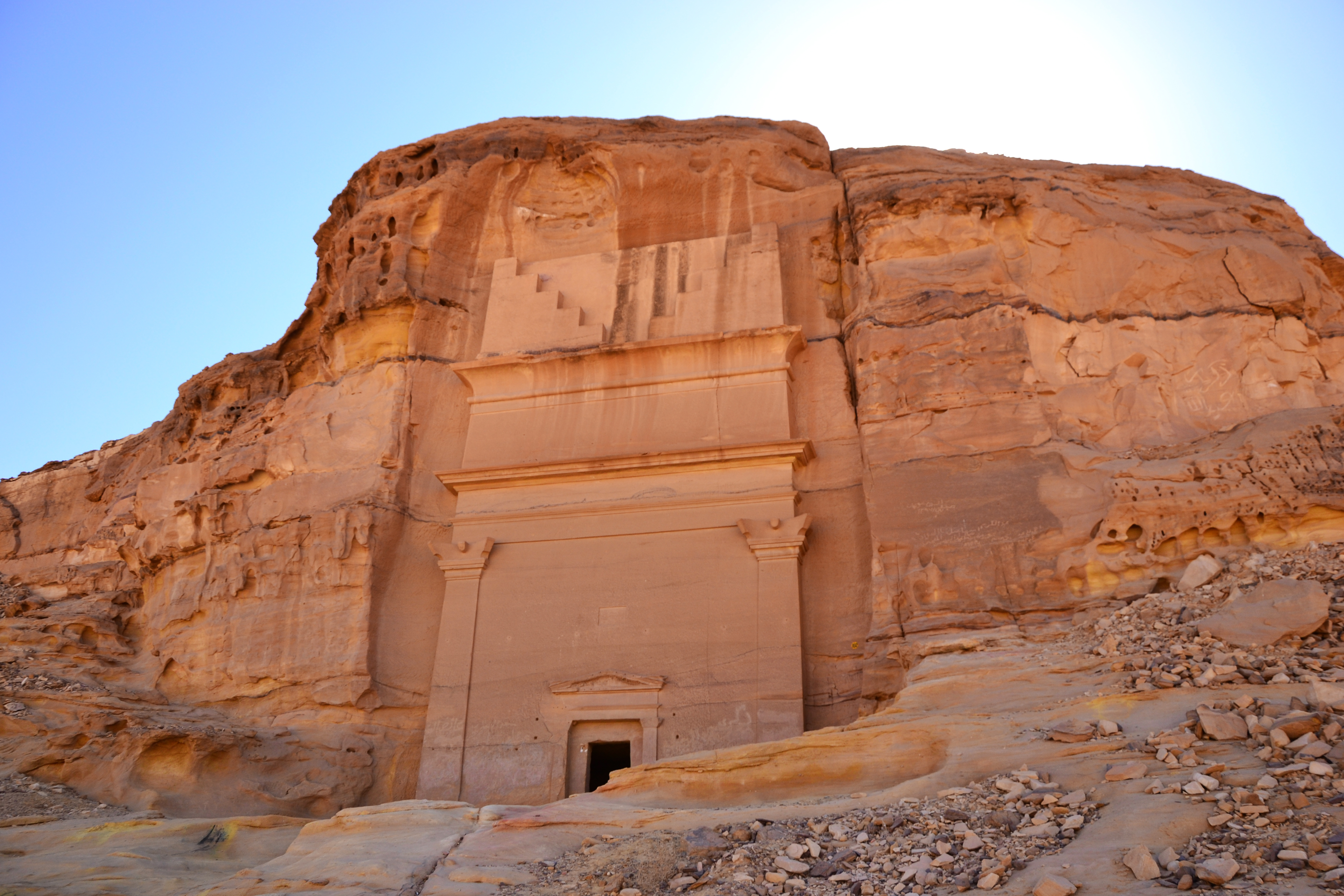
Qasr AlSanea, Arabic: قصر الصانع, romanized: Qaṣr al-Ṣāniʿ; One of the Nabataean tombs from the Madain Saleh necropolis

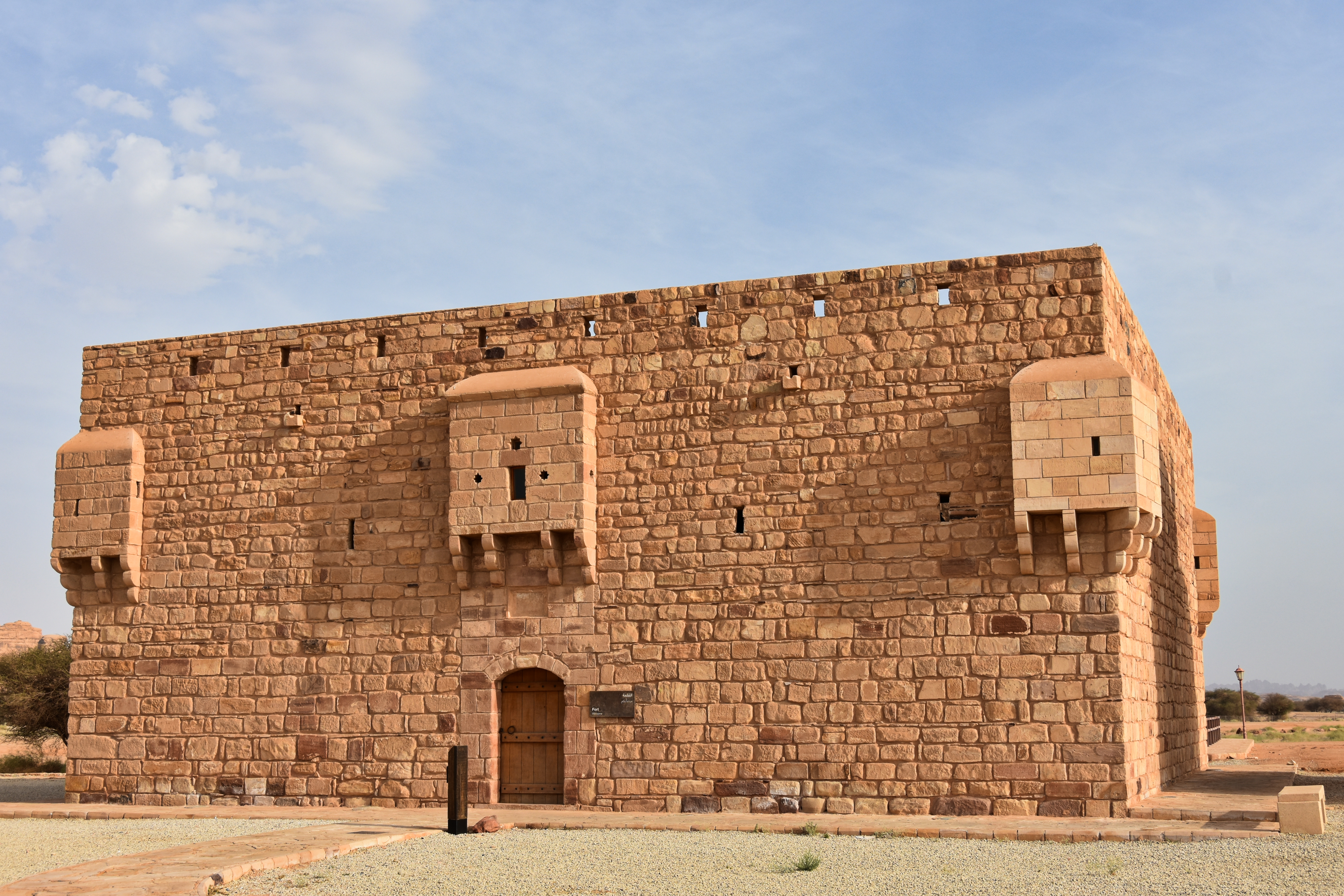
Al-Hijr Fort, Arabic: قلعة الحجر, romanized: Qalʿat al-Ḥijr.

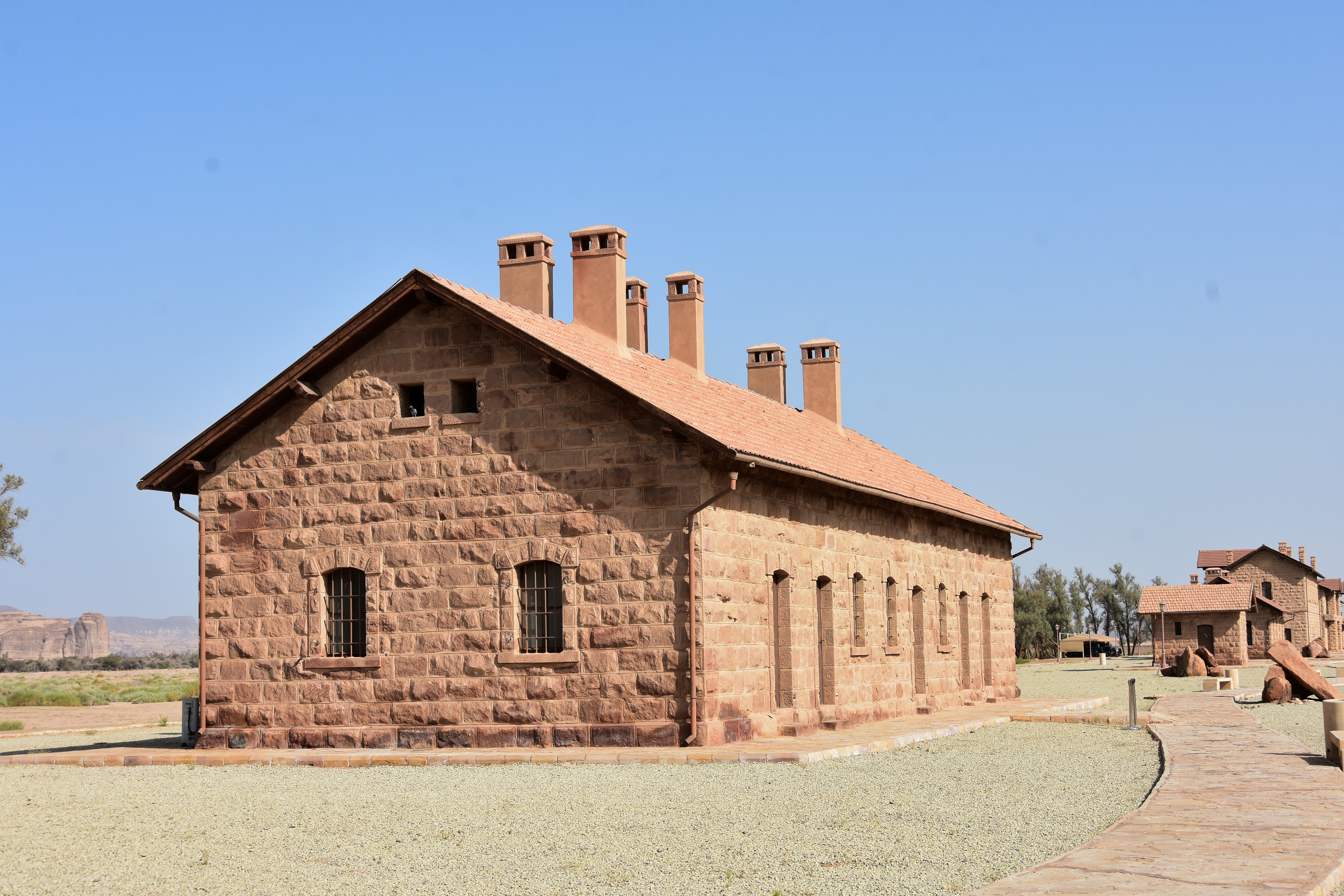
Hejaz Railway Station

== See also ==
- Al-Ula Development Company
- Sarat Mountains
- Hijaz Mountains
- Hijaz Railway
- Mawqaq
- Team Jayco–AlUla, a cycling team partly sponsored by the city
- The temple of Mahlab al-Naqa
- Al-Ula FC
- Jabal Ikmah
