= The temple of Mahlab al-Naqa =

- Interactive map of The temple of Mahlab al-Naqa
- 26.655779°N 37.912984°E
- Cultures: Ancient lihyan
- Location: Al-'Ula, Saudi Arabia

History
- Built: 7th-6th century BC

Site notes
- Architectural style: Dadanitic

The temple of Mahlab al-Naqa (Arabic: معبد محلب الناقة), also spelled Mahlib Annaqa, is a 6th-7th century BCE temple that was built by ancient (lihyanite), located in the Khuraybah area of al-Ula, Saudi Arabia.

== History ==
The temple contains a purification basin carved in front of a Lihyanite temple. The diameter of the ancient cistern is 3.75 metres (12.3 ft) and the depth is 2.15 metres (7 ft 1 in), with a capacity of some 2,400 L (530 imp gal; 630 U.S. gal) gallons of water. Three steps have been hewn inside the basin on the northern side of the cistern to facilitate access. It was most likely built to be used in religious rituals, as it is located adjacent to a religious structure.

== Bibliography ==
- Abdulrahman A. Alsuhaibani, Insights into construction techniques in Dédan, northwest of Saudi Arabia, 2019.
- Abdulrahman A. Alsuhaibani, Technic of construction in the site of Dadan, 2017.
