= Habitas =

HABITAS
- Founded: 2014
- Founders: Oliver Ripley, Kfir Levy, Eduardo Castillo
- Brands: HABITAS Tulum
- Website: ourhabitas.com

Habitas (stylized all caps HABITAS) is a hospitality management group. It operates hotels with its flagship location in Tulum, Mexico. In addition to its flagship hotel in Tulum, it is building other hotel properties throughout Mexico and Namibia.

== History ==
Habitas was founded in 2014 by Oliver Ripley, Kfir Levy and Eduardo Castillo. The idea of the company was to produce events that brought people together and share interests such as music, food, and art. Its first event was a 24-hour gathering for 150 people on a private ranch near Los Angeles, California. Habitas produced additional retreats for people in Nevada, Tulum, Ibiza, and California. The success of the events led to the idea of building a hotel based on the same retreat concept.

The first hotel was launched in 2016 in Tulum, Mexico. It was originally a popup hotel which was relocated to a permanent location in 2017. The hotel is located on beachfront property and contains 35 rooms. The only permanent structure is a community pavilion with everything on the property built and sourced locally.
