= Qurh, Saudi Arabia =

Qurh القرح
- Etymology: Ulcer
- Location within Saudi Arabia
- Coordinates: 26°37′N 37°55′E
- Country: Saudi Arabia
- Region: Al Madinah

Al-Qurh, is a village and archaeological site near Al-'Ula, north of Medina Saudi Arabia. The name القرح name translates as ulcers

Qurh, also known as al-Ma'abiyat, was the principal settlement of Wadi al-Qura and is identified with the ruins of al-Ma'abiyat in Wadi al-'Ula, eighteen kilometers southeast of the oasis Al-'Ula.

== History ==
There are numerous references to the place in the medieval Arabic sources. Excavation began in 1985. For example, al Muqad-dasi described Qurh as the largest town in the hijaz ...after Mecca, as well as the most flourishing and populous. al-Istakhri says that among the towns of the hijaz, Wadi al Qura is second only to al Yamama in size and production. while Yaqut says it was a very fertile valley covered in villages from end to end, and indeed the modern name of the wadi still means valley of villages.

Al-Muqaddasi adds it had a very diverse population.

Al-Muqaddasi also says palm trees skirt [Qurh]... it is possessed of very cheap dates, and excellent and copious springs of water of which Yakut numbers 80 springs. There is also evidence of a quanat 2.5 meters below the surface.
