= Antonin Jaussen =

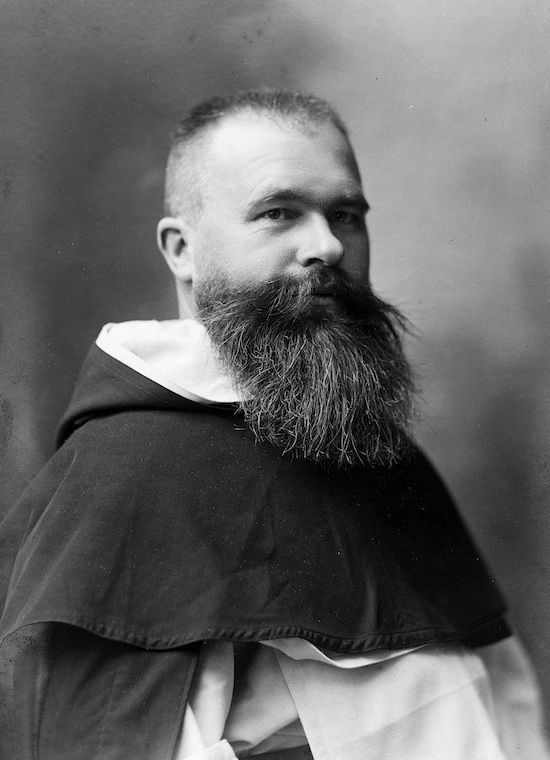
- Antonin Jaussen in 1923
- Born: May 27, 1871; Sanilhac, Ardèche, France
- Died: April 29, 1962 (aged 90)
- Occupation(s): Archaeologist, ethnologist, Catholic priest

Antonin Jaussen (May 27, 1871 – April 29, 1962) was a French ethnologist, archaeologist, and Catholic priest.

== Biography ==
Jaussen was born in 1871 in Sanilhac, Ardèche. He joined the Dominican Order at the age of 17. In 1890, he traveled to Jerusalem, where he was one of the first pupils of Marie-Joseph Lagrange.

== Works ==
- "Les tribus arabes à l'est du Jourdain" (1902).
- "Coutumes des Arabes au pays de Moab" (1908).
- "Antiquités religieuses dans l'Arabie du Nord" (1909).
- "Mission archéologique en Arabie, Paris, 1909-1914, en collaboration avec Raphaël Savignac".
- "La vie économique d'une famille demi-nomade à Madaba : les Ṣualḥuah" (1914).
- "Coutumes palestiniennes 1 - Naplouse et son district, Paris, Geuthner" (1927).

== Sources and bibliography ==
- Céline Hoyeau, « Les prêtres explorateurs: P.Antonin Jaussen », La Croix, 27 août 2013, p. 24.
- Jean-Jacques Pérennès (préf. Henry Laurens, professeur au Collège de France), Le Père Antonin Jaussen, o.p. (1871–1962): Une passion pour l'Orient musulman, Le Cerf, 2012.
- François Pouillon, Dictionnaire des orientalistes de langue française, Éditions Karthala, 2008, p. 515 (archive).
- Saba Farès-Drappeau, « RR. PP. A. Jaussen et R. Savignac - Mission archéologique en Arabie (Publication de la Société des fouilles archéologiques), 3 tomes [Tome I : De Jérusalem au Hedjaz Médaine-Saleh (mars-mai 1907), Paris, 1909 ; Tome II : El-'Ela, D'Hégra à Teima, Harrah de Tebouk, Paris, 1914 avec un Atlas (153 planches, cartes et plans) et un supplément au volume II : Les coutumes des Fuqarâ ; Tome III : Les châteaux arabes, Quseir 'Amra, Kharâneh et Tûba, Paris, 1922], Paris (P. Geuthner) - Le Caire (Institut Français d'Archéologie Orientale), 1997 (2e édition). », Revue des mondes musulmans et de la Méditerranée, juillet 2000, p. 89-90 (archive).
- Géraldine Chatelard (dir.), Mohammad Tarawneh, Antonin Jaussen, sciences sociales occidentales et patrimoine arabe : Actes du Colloque de juin 1998 : "Antonin Jaussen : genèse des sciences sociales occidentales, constitution d'un patrimoine arabe", Beyrouth, Centre d'études et de recherches sur le Moyen-Orient contemporain, 1999.
- Ernest Babelon, « Mission des PP. Jaussen et Savignac en Arabie (Hedjaz) », Comptes rendus de l'Académie des inscriptions et belles-lettres, no 4 - 54e année, 1910, p. 225-229 (archive)
- Jaussen et les services de renseignement français (1915–1919) in Henry Laurens, Orientales II. La IIIe République et l'Islam, CNRS, 2004, p. 143-159.
