= Timeline of Riyadh =

The following is a Gregorian timeline of the history for the city of Riyadh, Saudi Arabia.

== Late Triassic ==
- 200 million BC
  - A major extinction event occurs resulting in the disappearance of 76% of all terrestrial and marine life; Pterosaurs, mammals and fish were minimally affected. Archaeological findings around Riyadh provides contemporary artefacts and skeletal evidence.

== Late Cretaceous ==
- 72 million BC - Arabia had not yet separated from the African continent with large parts of Eastern Arabia and Riyadh submerged in the Tethys Ocean.
  - Plesiosauria disappears during the late Cretaceous mass extinction event.
  - Mosasaur flourishes during the mass extinction event replacing plesiosauria as the apex predator of the Tethys Ocean.
  - Abelisauroidea is a 6meter tall and 20m long bipedal dinosaur found in the Adaffa formation.
  - Titanosauria is a member of the Sauropod clade disappearing from Arabia during the late Cretaceous mass extinction event.

== Cenozoic ==
- 15 million BC
  - Desert Hedgehogs, belonging to the genus Paraechinus, flourish in Arabia.

== Middle Paleolithic ==
- 500000 BC - Homo Erectus produces the first stone tools.
- 125000 BC - First modern Homo Sapiens migrate to Arabia during the Early North African Dispersal.
- 100000 BC - Homo Sapiens invent the first long range weapon as a fire hardened wooden tipped spear.

== Upper Paleolithic ==
- 4000 BC - Bronze Age begins as craftsmen discover the smithing of tin and copper into bronze. Archaeological evidence shows tin could only be mined in Bavaria, Afghanistan and Cornwall. Tin's rarity made it costly to upkeep empires limiting the size of their armies. The bronze mace is invented as an impact weapon weighing 820 g (1.8 lb) swinging at a speed of 18 m/s (60 ft/s) with a human arm, generating 137 J (101 ft⋅lbf) of energy upon impact.
- 3000 BC - Early Bronze Age
- 2000 BC - Late Bronze Age
- 2500 BC - Sickle sword is developed by Sumerians in Arabia to harvest agricultural grain. The first recorded use of body armour is also found on the Stele of vultures in ancient Sumer, showing Eannatum's soldiers wearing leather cloaks with a number of sewn metal discs.
- 2254 BC - The first evidence of a composite bow appears in the Victory Stele of Naram Sin in Sumer.
- 2250 BC - A cast bronze socket spear blade is affixed to the shaft with rivets as a combat weapon.
- 2200 BC - A socket axe with a bronze socket and a blade cast into iron in one piece is produced.
- 1700BC The Hyksos possessed scaled body armour introducing it from Arabia to Egypt during a conquest. The scale body armour is sewn into a 6 mm (1/4 in) thick leather shirt with scale plates.
- 1225 BC - Iron Age begins. Ramses III defeats a coalition of sea people coinciding with the discovery and use of iron in warfare and agriculture. The Argive Shield and Grip is introduced to Mesopotamia.
- 800 BC - Assyrian army numbered 150,000 to 200,000 men, the largest standing army the middle east had witnessed. When arrayed for battle it fielded 2500 metres across and 100 metres deep; equipped entirely in iron weaponry, helmets and armour.
- 800BC - Assyria introduces lamella armour.
- 500BC Induction of funnels enables extreme smelting temperatures previously used in Bronze or Iron casting. Funnels force air over a heated core, drawing off more carbon from the molten metal.
- 331 BC Battle of Arbela; the Persian army under Darius fielded 300,000 infantry, 40,000 cavalry, 250 chariots and 50 elephants.
- 200 BC Steel arrives on the battle scene with innovations on the funnel and smelting techniques.
- 24 BC Almost an entire army led by the Roman Governor Aelius Gallus into Arabia dies of heatstroke and exhaustion.

== Prior to 20th century ==
- 1746 - Riyadh established as a walled town by Dahham bin Dawwas.
- 1773 - Riyadh overrun by Emirate of Diriyah
- 1823 - Riyadh becomes capital of Emirate of Nejd.
- 1865, Masmak fort is constructed under the Provincial instruction of Prince of Riyadh, Abdulrahman ibn Sulaiman ibn Dabaan.
- 1865–1878, Fayṣal dies and his eldest son, 'Abd Allāh, succeeds and engages in a six-year rebellion against his brother Sa'ūd II over a dispute for succession; in the Battle of Jūdah, 'Abd allāh fled, and Sa'ūd reignes supreme. For the next seven years, infighting in the Sa'ūd family causes the throne to change hands several times. Fayṣal makes the mistake of not assigning Governmental figures in the Arabian Peninsula from the Royal Family.
- 1880 Ibn Sa'ūd is born into the noble Sa'ūd dynasty in Riyadh, Arabia.

== 20th century ==
- 1901, Abd al Aziz and the Saud dynasty is exiled in Kuwait; the Saūd warriors are disciplined with Wahhābism as a military doctrine to ensure the loyalty and survival of the Saud dynasty during times of military strife and apartheid; not the civilians.
- 1902 January 13 - Battle of Riyadh. Abd al Aziz commands a successful raid with 40 camel riders on the Masmak Fort in a bold attempt to reclaim his families lands; besieging the Rashīd garrison under the rule of the Al Rashīd Governor in Najd, Riyadh. A famous battle is pitched between Nobility establishing Abd al Aziz as the Al Saūd leader and Wahhabi Imam.
- 1904 June 15, Ibn Rashīd appeals to the Ottoman Empire for assistance after a series of setbacks to the Saūd; the Rashīdī begin to reconsolidate their forces in central Arabia.
- 1907–1912, The Ottoman Empire withdraws military support from the desultory infighting amongst the Rashīdī and Saūd factions.
- 1910 - Population: 14,000.
- 1915 December, Ibn Saūd signs a protectorate treaty with the British Empire for a small subsidy and enters the war against Ibn Rashīd who was supported by the Ottoman Empire.
- 1919 - Royal family relocates to Riyadh.
- 1921, Sharīf Husayn's son 'Abd Allāh becomes the rulers of Transjordan and a second son Faysal becomes the Sultan of Iraq.
- 1924, 'Ibn Saūd now rules Central Arabia except the Hejaz province along the Red Sea. Sharīf Husayn of Mecca declares himself Caliph and Sultan of Hejaz.
- 1929 - Muhammad bin Saad bin Zaid becomes governor of Riyadh Province.
- 1930 - Population: 27,000.
- 1932 September 23 - Riyadh becomes the capital of Saudi Arabia. Abd al Aziz ibn Abd ar-Rahman Al Saūd unifies competing tribes into a modern state by constituting the Kingdom of Saudi Arabia. Saudis commemorate a national holiday every year on this date as an Independence Day for Sunni Muslims; the Al Saud dynasty permits the celebration of the Holy day of Ashura in Eastern provinces for Shia Muslims.
- 1933
  - May, Ibn Saūd signs a concession with an American oil company.
  - California-Arabian Standard Oil Company signs a concession for the rights to explore for oil in Riyadh.
- 1936
  - Construction of Murabba Palace is commissioned by 'Ibn Saūd.
  - Texaco Incorporate purchases 50% in shares for the California-Arabian Standard Oil Company.
- 1937
  - Nasser bin Abdulaziz becomes governor of Riyadh Province.
- 1938
  - March, Saudi Oil Companies strike oil for the first time; work virtually ceases during the outbreak of war in Europe and while disputes over control of the Anglo-Persian Oil Fields in Iran, Turkey and Iraq contribute to the conflict. Much of the oil reserves in Saudi Arabia remain mostly undiscovered; Saudi Arabia remains neutral throughout the European Theatre of War.
- 1944
  - California-Arabian Standard Oil Company changes its name to the Arabian-American Oil Company.
- 1945
  - The Murabba Palace is completed housing two stories and 32 rooms for the Saūd Royal Family.
  - Sultan Abdul Aziz commissions The Red Palace for his son 'Ibn Saūd as the first concrete-steel structure in Saudi Arabia; it is completed by the contractor Mohammad Binladen with help from Egyptian architects.
- 1947
  - Shabab AlRiyadh football club formed.
  - Sultan bin Abdulaziz becomes governor of Riyadh Province.
- 1948
  - Standard Oil of New Jersey and Socony Vacuum each purchase 10% of shares in the Arabian-American Oil Company while California-Arabian Standard Oil Company and Texaco retain 30% each.
- 1950
  - Saudi Library established.
  - City wall dismantled.
  - Population: 83,000.
- 1950
  - Ibn Saūd receives $200,000 in oil exports.
  - Prince Khalid bin Abdullah is born into the Royal Family thanks to his mother Munira bint Abdullah Al Shaykh.
- 1951 - Railway begins operating (to eastern coast).
- 1952 - Nayef bin Abdulaziz Al Saud becomes governor of Riyadh Province.
- 1953 - Airport opens.
- 1953, Ibn Saūd receives $2,500,000 per week from oil exports and entrepreneurial activities.
- 1953, Ibn Saūd dies in Al-Tā'if marked by severe physical and emotional deterioration. Saud succeeds his father as Sultan following the death of Abd Al Aziz.
- 1954 - Salman bin Abdul-Aziz becomes governor of Riyadh Province.
- 1955 - Al Nassr FC formed.
- 1957
  - King Saūd University opens.
  - Al-Tarbiyah Al-Namouthajiyah Schools established.
  - Olympic Club and Al-Hilal (basketball) club formed.
  - Turki bin Abdul-Aziz becomes governor of Riyadh Province.
  - Annasriyyah royal residential district built.
  - Riyadh Zoo is formed to House gifts to the Royal Family.
- 1961
  - Fawwaz bin Abdulaziz Al Saud becomes governor of Riyadh Province.
  - Institute of Public Administration established.
- 1962 - Population: 169,185.
- 1963
  - Badr bin Saud bin Abdulaziz becomes governor of Riyadh Province, succeeded by Salman bin Abdulaziz Al Saud.
  - American International School established.
- 1964, Saud is deposed as Sultan by the Saud Royal Family and Ulama in response to public discontent; his half-brother Faisal is made the Sultan of the Kingdom of Saudi Arabia.
- 1965 - Al Riyadh newspaper begins publication.
- 1968
  - Population: 281,260.
  - Pakistan International School and Dar al-Kutub al-Watani'yah (library) established.
- 1970
  - Riyadh University for Women founded.
  - King Faisal Specialist Hospital cornerstone laid.
  - Sultan Faisal of the House of Saūd forms the Supreme Judicial Council to oversee the court system and review legal decisions; the SJC assumes the task of approving all capital punishment, amputation and stoning sentences. The minister of defence and Sultan review decisions made in the military court for anyone accused of violating military regulations.
  - Arabian oryx native to Arabia goes extinct in the wild.
- 1972 - World Assembly of Muslim Youth founded.
- 1973, Saudi Arabia remains neutral in the Israeli conflict.
- 1973, Saudi Arabia joins an oil embargo imposed on the United States.
- 1974
  - Imam Muhammad ibn Saud Islamic University established.
  - Population: 666,840.
- 1974, Royal Decree for the Saudi Fund for Development (SFD) grants financial assistance to developing countries.
- 1975
  - 1975 March 25: King Faisal falls victim to an assassination plot from one of his nephews amidst discontent Royal Family members and Faisal's half-brother Khalid assumes power.
  - 18 June: Faisal bin Musaid beheaded at Dira Square.
- 1976
  - Population: 598,239.
  - City hosts Arab League summit.
  - Dar Alshefa Hospital opens in the Al Wisham District near King Fahd Road.
- 1977 - Saudi Arabian National Center for Science & Technology established.
- 1978
  - Riyadh Military Hospital founded.
  - Riyadh TV Tower built.
- 1979
  - British International School established.
  - Ajlan & Brothers is founded as a clothing manufacturer specialising in men's headwear and garments such as the Ghuttra and Thawb.
  - The College of Applied Medical Sciences (CAMS) is constructed as an alumni college to the King Saūd University supporting; Biomedical Technology, Clinical Laboratories, a Radiology Department, Community Health Technology, Dentistry and Optometry for Vision.
  - Saudi Arabian National Guard Modernisation is assigned to USASAC to support major military operations and help spearhead international peacekeeping and humanitarian efforts. Virginia-based Vinnell Corporation help operate the programme with 80,000 strong Saudi National Guard units educated on how to operate and maintain United States-supplied military equipment.
- 1980
  - Saudi Arabia sides with Iraq in the Iran-Iraq war; King Fahd requests the US to intervene when Iraq invades Kuwait.
  - Arabian oryx protected in zoos are reintroduced to the wild.
- 1981
  - King Fahd Road laid out.
  - Riyadh railway station opened.
- 1982
  - Indian Embassy School founded.
  - Riyadh Dry Port established.
- 1982, Khalid's half-brother Crown Prince Fahd ascends to the throne following Khalid's death.
- 1983
  - King Faisal Center for Research and Islamic Studies and Riyadh College of Technology opens.
  - King Khalid International Airport opens operating 35 km North of Riyadh.
- 1984
  - Rajhi Steel Industries Ltd is founded as an active member of the Arab Iron & Steel Union.
- 1985
  - Tuwaiq Palace is constructed by Omrania and Associates in a joint venture with Frei Otto and Buro Happold.
  - Al Hammadi Hospital opens in the Olaya District to provide healthcare to local patients, later forming the Al Hammadi Hospital Group.
  - Philippine Embassy School in Riyadh (currently International Philippine School in Riyadh) founded by former Philippine Ambassador Mauyag Tamano.
- 1986
  - King Fahd Causeway opened.
  - Diplomatic Quarter Mosque is constructed by the Urban Planning firm Omrania and Associates in close proximity to the Al-Kindi Plaza later winning the Arab Cities Award for Architecture in 1990.
- 1987
  - King Fahd International Stadium built.
  - Population: 1,417,000.
  - Rotana Group in business.
  - Omrania and Associates construct the Gulf Cooperation Council Headquarters
  - Riyadh Zoo is opened to the public.
- 1988
  - August, King Fahd helps to bring a cease-fire between Iraq and Iran. Fahd supports the formation of the Gulf Cooperation Council (GCC) as an alliance of the six Persian Gulf states of the Arabian Peninsula headquartered in Riyadh. The United Kingdom replaces the US as Saudi Arabia's primary arms supplier.
  - Arabian-American Oil Company changes its name to Saudi Aramco.
- 1989 - New interior ministry headquarters completed
- 1990
  - King Fahad National Library, Bangladesh International School, English Section and Prince Salman Center for Disability Research founded.
  - Women protest driving ban.
- 1990
  - Yemen, Jordan and the Palestine Liberation Organisation (PLO) refuses to support the Saudi coalition following the Iraq invasion of Kuwait in the Gulf War.
  - IKEA opens in the Al Farooq district covering 6,000m^{2} in warehouse space for affordable home furnishings.
- 1991, The Gulf War displaces regional diplomatic relationships following Iraq's invasion of Kuwait. Saudi Arabia requests US assistance and a multinational coalition to defend the Saudi borders; cultivating western allegiances with the GCC and regional Islamic states in fear of Saddam Hussein's Baathist movement in Iraq.
- 1993
  - A Royal Decree divides the Saudi Kingdom into 13 provinces; Al Bahah, Al Hudad ash Shamilyah, Al Jawf, Al Madinah, Al Qasim, Ar Riyad, Ash Sharqiyah, Asir, Hail, Jizan, Makkah, Najran and Tabuk.
  - The Basic Law is established articulating the Governments rights and regulations, civil rights, a system of Government and administrative divisions. The Quran and Sunna are mandated as the states constitution; Saudi society should dismiss the notion of a separation between Religion and state. The Basic law enables all citizens to address their concerns with the King or a Royal Prince.
- 1994
  - Royal Decree subdivides the 13 Provinces of the Saudi Kingdom into 103 governorates.
  - Al Imam General Hospital is constructed on Islamabad Street connected to the Southern Ring Road.
- 1995
  - A device placed inside a van near the National Guard Headquarters is detonated from remote device obliterating five Americans, two Indians and wounds 60 people with shrapnel. King Fahd convenes his Cabinet and "expressed its condemnation of this criminal act, which is foreign to our society, beliefs and religion," the Saudi Press Agency reported. Crown Prince Abdullah bin Abdel-Aziz tours the site of the blast, but made no public comment.
  - King Fahd suffers a stroke with severe limitation to his mental capacity; his half brother, the Crown Prince of Saudi Arabia Abd Allah, serves as the de facto ruler of Saudi Arabia.
  - Masmak fort museum opens.
- 1996
  - Arabian Leopard is placed on the IUCN Red List
- 1997
  - Population: 3,100,000.
  - Rajhi Steel Industries Limited construct the Wadi Laban Bridge designed by Seshadri Srinivasan.
- 1998 - New Middle East International School established.
- 1998, Saudi Arabia's telecommunications industry is privatised employing more than 70,000 Saudis. Statistics report 43 AM, 31 FM and two short-wave operational radio stations with the broadcast of two television channels, one in English and one in Arabic.
- 1998
  - Omrania and Associates construct the NCCI Headquarters.
  - US military exports to Saudi Arabia totals $4.3billion; SA is the leading importer of US military goods.
- 1999
  - National Museum of Saudi Arabia, Prince Sultan Private College, and Royal Saudi Air Force Museum established.
  - King Abdulaziz Public Library opens.
  - The internet service is made available to Saudis with access through a Saudi state server.
- 2000
  - March 24, Al Faisaliyah Center is constructed in the Financial District of Riyadh standing at 267meters in height.
  - Saudi Arabia donates the following during times of high oil revenues; $307million to Palestine, $1billion to Iraq in loans and exports and $153million to Pakistan in loans and export guarantees.
  - A border agreement is reached to lessen tensions between Saudi Arabia and Yemen significantly through a formal submission; although the overall concern for uncontrolled migrations of tribesmen across the border of Yemen persists as a potential security risk.

== 21st century ==
=== 2000s ===
- 2001
  - Al-Yamamah College established.
  - Omrania and Associates construct the Kingdom Hospital, Riyadh.
  - Omrania and Associates construct the Four Seasons Hotel, Riyadh.
  - Wadi Hanifah bioremediation begins.
  - Population: 4,137,000.
  - Saudi Arabia is one of only two Governments to recognise the Taliban administration in Afghanistan as a formal entity. King Abd Allah condemns the US war with Iraq and refuses to commit Saudi military units in the conflict. SA Government formerly severs diplomatic relations with the Taliban following the human coordinated aviation tragedy on the Twin Towers in New York. SA Government opposes the US decision to enact operation Enduring Freedom based on the information available and also declines to participate in the Iraq war; the SA Government declines an operational supply line of oil during the initial stages of the campaign.
  - Saudi Arabia provides the personnel for a small contingent of 10,000 men assigned to the Gulf Cooperation Council (GCC). The GCC force is called the Peninsula Shield Force; although there were discrepancies in the military discipline of the contingent.
- 2002
  - Al Mamlaka Tower built.
  - Kingdom Centre completed.
  - Omrania and Associates construct the SAMBA offices in the Kingdom Centre with 8,200 m^{2} of office space costing SR 24,000,000 ⇌ USD 6,000,000.
  - Sahara Plaza shopping mall built.
  - Saudi Arabia has 151 mainline telephones per 1000 people.
- 2003
  - May: Bombings.
  - The Saudi Government reorganises the Council of Ministers with the plan to create municipal councils and hold democratic elections.
  - Al-Qaeda and JI operate in several Islamic charities; diverting 15-20% of the funds to finance operations (Abuza, 2003).
  - US military redeploys most of its 5000 US personnel stations in Saudi Arabia to Qatar.
- 2004
  - Al Ekhbariya television begins broadcasting.
  - Delta International School founded.
  - Riyadh College of Dentistry and Pharmacy established.
  - Omrania and Associates undertake the Prince Mohammed Bin Abdulaziz Street Revitalisation Project.
  - Nearly 2million pilgrims visit Saudi Arabia to complete the Hajj.
  - Saudi Arabia attains 1,392 km of railroads enabling the transport of cargo and passengers linking the capital with ports and industrial cities.
  - September, Al-Midi Mosque is opened later winning an Award for the Organisation of Arab and Muslim Capitals in 2007.
  - Dec: two car bombings in Riyadh.
- 2005
  - Burj Al Anoud built.
  - King Saud bin Abdulaziz University for Health Sciences established.
  - SA hosts its first-ever Counter-Terrorism Conference.
  - Saudi Arabia pressures Syria to withdraw its forces from Lebanon and maintains diplomatic contact with Hamas in Palestine urging the new Palestinian Government to honour Palestinian agreements with Israel.
  - Abd Abdullah is officially made the King of Saudi Arabia following King Fahd's death.
- 2006 - Riyadh International Book Fair begins.
- 2007 - Alfaisal University opens.
- 2008
  - General Electric Plastics (GE Plastics) is sold to Saudi Arabia Basic Industries Corporation (SABIC) for US$11.6Billion ⇌ SAR 43.5Billion; GE Plastics is a branch of General Electric specialising in plastic manufactury, and is part of the GE Industrial Division.
  - Princess Nourah Bint Abdulrahman University is inaugurated by King Abdulaziz.
- 2009
  - March: Sandstorm.
  - October: Italconsult S.p.A. construct 428 km of the Al-Quassim Expressway (Highway 65) connecting the North of Riyadh to Buraidah and the South to Al-Kharj containing; 20 interchanges, 30 bridges and 4 camel crossings.

=== 2010s ===
- 2010 - Population: 5,188,286.
- 2011
  - May: Sattam bin Abdul-Aziz Al Saud becomes governor of Riyadh Province.
  - October: Funeral of Sultan bin Abdulaziz.
  - Arabian oryx reverts from endangered to vulnerable with populations over 1,000 in Saudi Arabia.
- 2012
  - Abdullah Bin Abdul Rahman Al Mogbel becomes mayor.
  - November: Truck crash.
- 2013
  - Mohammed bin Nayef Centre opens.
  - Lockheed Martin Saudi Arabia in business.
  - November, King Abdullah Environmental Park is inaugurated and opened to the general Public.
- 2014
  - Air pollution in Riyadh reaches annual mean of 156 PM2.5 and 368 PM10, much higher than recommended.
  - Condemnation of summer Dhub hunting by the locals for the lizard Uromastyx, poaching for delicacies is threatening many endangered species in the neighbouring region.
- 2017
  - King Abdullah Financial District Grand Mosque is constructed by the engineering firm Omrania and Associates.
  - The total Number of dwellings in Al-Riyadh is 829670 according to the 2017 Saudi Arabian Housing Survey; 279708 apartments, 1630 floors in traditional housing, 125836 floors in a traditional villa, 374900 traditional villas and 47596 traditional houses.
  - Housing units by approximate age of the 829670 housing units in Al-Riyadh; 86064 older than 30 years, 176692 between 20 and 30 years old, 257214 between 10 and 20 years old, 238632 between 5–10 years old and 71068 between 0–5 years old.
  - The percentage of houses inhabited by Saudi's in the Riyadh region stands at 23.67%.
  - The highest percentage of dwelling type in Riyadh are Villas at 45.19%.
  - The major material used to manufacture houses in Riyadh is reinforced concrete in 98.38% of dwellings.
  - Approximately 61% of Saudi Households use Ceramic flooring.
  - Administrative construction material for the 829670 dwellings is as follows; 816304 concrete, 13040 brick, 0 mud/earth and 326 stone. The construction material by dwelling type; 279708 apartments constructed from concrete, 1630 floors in a traditional house constructed from concrete, 125836 villa floors constructed from concrete, 379400 villas constructed from concrete, 34230 traditional houses constructed from concrete, 13040 traditional houses constructed from brick and 326 traditional houses constructed from stone.
  - The administrative area of tenure in Al-Riyadh; 464876 are privately owned, 358926 are rented, 2934 are provided by the employer and 2934 are Other forms of tenure.
  - The administrative area and source of water supply in Al-Riyadh; 740020 public water pipe, 89324 water trucks and 326 Wells.
  - The administrative area and supply of drinking water in Al-Riyadh; 248412 public water pipe, 122576 water purifier, 98778 water trucks, 1630 Wells, 358274 bottled water.
  - The administrative area of water Storage in Al-Riyadh; 783704 Cement Tanks, 4238 Tin Tanks and 41728 Fibreglass Tanks.
  - The administrative area and source of electricity in Al-Riyadh; 827714 Public Network and 1956 private networks.
  - The administrative area and sewage disposal in Al-Riyadh; 628202 Public Sewage Network, 1630 Private Network and 199838 Ditches.
  - The administrative area for insecticide usage in Al-Riyadh; 91932 regular use, 553548 when needed and 184190 never used.
  - The administrative area; 829670 household units and 4838195 individuals.
- 2018
  - SPIMACO constructs the Spimaco Addwaeih Tower for SAR 100,000,000 ⇌ USD 26,660,500 in Al-Sahafa, Riyadh, standing at 89.97m in height with 20 floors; its core business is medical & pharmaceutical, which includes development, manufacturing and sales of pharmaceutical products and medical appliances.
- 2019
  - Omrania and Associates construct the Radisson Blu Hotel and Residences, Diplomatic Quarter, for hospitality and leisure activity in Riyadh.
  - Omrania and Associates construct the Hilton Riyadh Hotel and Residences.
  - Saudi Aramco purchase a 70% majority shareholder stake in SABIC from the Public Investment Fund of Saudi Arabia in a deal worth SAR 259.125 billion ⇌ USD $69.1 billion; the remaining 30% of public shares remain with SABIC.
  - A Saudi Royal Decree officiates the Royal Commission for Riyadh as the commanding Agency for the Riyadh Development Authority.
- 2020
  - Omrania and Associates construct the Western Hub Station as part of the Riyadh Metro Transit System.
  - Omrania and Associates construct the King Salman Park.
  - Daewoo Engineering & Construction and Hanwha Engineering & Construction complete the Dahiyat Al Furan New City Mega Project to construct 100,000 new Housing units; apartments, townhouses, education buildings and commercial assets to support a Population of 600,000 on a budget of US$20billion ⇌ SAR 75billion.
- 2021
  - The Riyadh Metro is now fully operational on a budget of US$22.5Billion ⇌ SAR 85Billion; an urban mass Transit System operating with six Lines and 85 stations.
- 2023
  - Salini Impregilo construct The Avenues complex in Riyadh with a leasable area of 390,000 m^{2} for US$1.9Billion ⇌ SAR 7.1Billion. The project includes two residential towers containing 1050 units, two 4&5 star hotel towers featuring 500 rooms, a medical tower with 240 clinics and office space.
- 2024
  - The Riyadh Metro was inaugurated by King Salman.
- 2025
  - Virgin Hyperloop One chaired by Sultan Ahmed Bin Sulayem announces the planned completion for 35 km of electromagnetic propulsion acceleration pods connecting the modernised trainlinks between Riyadh and Jeddah reducing the commuting time from 10 hours to just 76 minutes.

== See also ==
- Riyadh history
- Timelines of other cities in Saudi Arabia: Jeddah, Mecca, Medina
- Gregorian timeline to Hijri timeline converter.

== Bibliography ==
Published in 19th century

- William Gifford Palgrave (1868), "Ri'ad (etc.)", Personal narrative of a year's journey through central and eastern Arabia (1862-63), London: Macmillan
- George Ripley; Charles A. Dana, eds. (1879). "Riyad". American Cyclopaedia (2nd ed.). NY: Appleton.

Published in 20th century

- H. St. J. B. Philby (1922), "The Wahhabi Capital", The heart of Arabia, London: Constable
- H. St. J. B. Philby (Spring 1959). "Riyadh: Ancient and Modern". Middle East Journal. 13.
- Madge Pendleton (1984), "Riyadh", Green Book Guide for Living in Saudi Arabia (4th ed.), Washington DC: Middle East Editorial Associates, OL 8342230M
- Hans Karl Barth; Friedrich Quiel (July 1987). "Riyadh and its Development". GeoJournal. 15 (1): 39. Bibcode:1987GeoJo..15...39B. doi:10.1007/BF02393470.
- Mohammed Al-Gabbani (August 1991). "Population Density Pattern and Change in the City of Riyadh, Saudi Arabia". GeoJournal. 24 (4): 375. Bibcode:1991GeoJo..24..375A. doi:10.1007/BF00578259.
- William Facey. Riyadh: The Old City, London: Immel Publishing, 1992.
- Saud Al-Oteibi; Allen G. Noble; Frank J. Costa (February 1993). "The Impact of Planning on Growth and Development in Riyadh, Saudi Arabia, 1970-1990". GeoJournal. 29 (2): 163. Bibcode:1993GeoJo..29..163A. doi:10.1007/BF00812813.
- "Riyadh", Arab Gulf States, Lonely Planet, 1993, OL 8314448M
