= Timeline of Jeddah =

The following is a timeline of the history of the city of Jeddah, Kingdom of Saudi Arabia.

== Prior to 20th century ==
- 500 BCE - Quda'a settle.
- 647 CE - Uthman Ibn Affan, turns Jeddah into a port making it the port of Makkah instead of Al Shoaiba port.
- 703 CE - Jeddah was briefly occupied by pirates from the Kingdom of Axum.
- 969 CE - Fatimids in power.
- 1177 - Jeddah becomes part of the Ayyubid Empire.
- 1254 - City becomes part of the Mamluk Sultanate.
- 1400 - In the 15th century it became the centre of trade between Egypt and India.
- 1517 - City besieged by Ottomans.
- 1525 - Barracks built; city walls rebuilt with six watchtowers and six city gates.
- 1541 - City besieged by Portuguese.
- 1804 - Town besieged by Sauds.
- 1811 - Ottomans in power.
- 1813 - Battle of Jeddah (1813).
- 1814 - Population: 15,000 (approximate).
- 1820 - European cemetery established (approximate date).
- 1855 - The Hejaz rebellion takes place in Hejaz against the Ottoman Empire, and results in riots in both Mecca and Jeddah.
- 1858 - 15 June: the Jeddah Massacre of 1858 takes place.
- 1881 - Nasseef House built.

== 20th century ==
- 1910 - Population: 30,000 (approximate).
- 1916 - Sharifians in power.
- 1924 - Capital of Kingdom of Hejaz relocates to Jeddah from Mecca.
- 1925 - Battle of Jeddah (1925), House of Saud in power.
- 1927 - Ittihad Football Club formed.
- 1932 - Khozam Palace built.
- 1937
  - Al Madina (newspaper) begins publication.
  - Al-Ahli Saudi Sports Club formed.
- 1938 - Al-Ahli Jeddah (basketball) club formed.
- 1939 - A military airstrip was established east of the city center, later known as Jeddah Airport
- 1946 - Jeddah Chamber of Commerce & Industry established.
- 1947 - City wall dismantled.
- 1953 - National Commercial Bank headquartered in Jeddah.
- 1960 - Okaz newspaper begins publication.
- 1962 - Population: 147,859.
- 1967 - King Abdulaziz University established.
- 1970 - Prince Abdullah al-Faisal Stadium opens.
- 1971 - Organization of the Islamic Conference headquartered in city.
- 1972 - International Islamic News Agency headquartered in Jeddah.
- 1974 - Population: 561,104.
- 1975
  - Islamic Development Bank headquartered in Jeddah.
  - Hajj Research Centre founded at King Abdul Aziz University.
  - Arab News begins publication.
- 1976 - Saudi Gazette begins publication.
- 1977 - British International School established.
- 1981 - King Abdulaziz International Airport begins operating, replacing the old airport.
- 1983 - Corniche Road constructed.
- 1984 - Dallah Al-Baraka in business.
- 1985 - King Fahd's Fountain begins operating.
- 1987
  - Jufali Mosque, King Saud Mosque, and Al-Mahmal Center built.
  - King Abdul Aziz Public Library and Prince Sultan bin Fahd Stadium open.
  - Population: 1,312,000.
- 1988 - Azizeyah Mosque, Binladen Mosque, and Suleiman Mosque built.
- 1990
  - Jeddah Light (lighthouse) constructed.
  - Jeddah Historical Preservation Society organized.
- 1993 - Arab Radio and Television Network established.
- 1998
  - Iqraa TV headquartered in Jeddah.
  - Al-Ittihad Jeddah (basketball) club formed.
- 1999
  - Jeddah Economic Forum begins.
  - Saudi Geological Survey headquartered in Jeddah.

== 21st century ==
- 2003 - Jeddah United women's basketball team formed.
- 2005
  - Adel Fakeih becomes mayor.
  - Population: 2,800,000 (estimate).
  - Serafi Mega Mall in business.
- 2006
  - Jeddah Film Festival begins.
  - Jeddah TV Tower built.
- 2008 - Mall of Arabia and Red Sea Mall in business.
- 2009 - 25 November: Flood.
- 2010
  - Hani Mohammad Aburas becomes mayor.
  - Population: 3,230,697.
- 2011
  - 26 January: Flood.
  - King Road Tower built.
  - Women to drive demonstrations.
- 2012 - Population: 3,412,018.
- 2014 - Air pollution in Jeddah reaches annual mean of 68 PM2.5 and 161 PM10, much higher than recommended.

== See also ==
- List of universities and colleges in Jeddah
- Timelines of other cities in Saudi Arabia: Mecca, Medina, Riyadh

== Bibliography ==
Published in 18th-19th centuries

- Carsten Niebuhr (1792). "Of the City of Jidda and its Vicinity". Travels through Arabia. Half-title:Niebuhr's travels through Arabia and other countries in the East. Translated by Robert Heron. Edinburgh: R. Morison and Son. hdl:2027/hvd.hxj9mv – via HathiTrust.
- William Milburn (1813), "Judda", Oriental Commerce, London: Black, Parry & Co., OCLC 6856418
- Johann Ludwig Burckhardt (1829). "(Djidda)". Travels in Arabia. London: H. Colburn. hdl:2027/mdp.39015010937236.
- James Horsburgh (1852). "Red Sea, East Side: Jiddah". India Directory: Or, Directions for Sailing to and from the East Indies, China, Australia, and the Interjacent Ports of Africa and South America (6th ed.). London: William H. Allen & Co. – via Google Books.
- Richard Burton (1857), "To Jeddah", Personal Narrative of a Pilgrimage to el Medinah and Meccah (2nd ed.), London: Longman, Brown, Green, Longmans, and Roberts, OCLC 5778233
- Heinrich Freiherrn von Maltzan (1865), "Dschedda", Meine Wallfahrt nach Mekka (in German), Leipzig: Dyk'sche Buchhandlung, OCLC 72240504

Published in 20th century

- "Jidda" . Encyclopædia Britannica. Vol. 15 (11th ed.). 1910. pp. 414–415.
- A. Pesce. Jiddah: Portrait of an Arabian City. London, 1974.
- Madge Pendleton (1984), "Jeddah", Green Book Guide for Living in Saudi Arabia (4th ed.), Washington DC: Middle East Editorial Associates, OL 8342230M
- Abdal-Majeed Ismail Daghistani (1993), A Case Study in Planning Implementation: Jeddah, Saudi Arabia, University of Newcastle upon Tyne, Global Urban Research Unit
- Tawfiq M. Abu-Ghazzeh (1994). "Built Form and Religion: Underlying Structures of Jeddah Al-Qademah". Traditional Dwellings and Settlements Review. 5. International Association for the Study of Traditional Environments – via University of California, Berkeley.
- "Jeddah", Arab Gulf States, Lonely Planet, 1993, OL 8314448M

Published in 21st century

- Clifford Edmund Bosworth, ed. (2007). "Jeddah". Historic Cities of the Islamic World. Leiden: Koninklijke Brill.
- Gabor Agoston; Bruce Alan Masters (2009). "Jeddah". Encyclopedia of the Ottoman Empire. Facts on File. p. 298. ISBN 978-1-4381-1025-7.
