= Timeline of Medina =

The following is a timeline of the history of the city of Medina, Saudi Arabia.

== Prior to 20th century ==
- 6th C. CE - Yathrib settled "by three Jewish tribes, the Banu Quynuqa, the Banu Qurayza, and the Banu Nadir."
- 622 CE / 0-1 H
  - Muhammad arrives from Mecca, with followers (muhajirun).
  - Quba Mosque and Al-Masjid al-Nabawi (Mosque of the Prophet) built.
  - Yathrib renamed "Medina."
  - Baqi Cemetery established.
- 623 CE - Masjid al-Qiblatayn (Mosque of the two Qiblas) built.
- 624 CE - Prophet's House built.
- 627
  - March–April: Battle of the Trench.
  - Constitution of Medina created (approximate date).
- 630 - Medina and Mecca "established as the holy cities of Islam."
- 632 CE / 11 H
  - 8 June: Death of Muhammad.
  - Abu Bakr appointed caliph; Rashidun Caliphate established.
- 634 - Umar becomes caliph.
- 639 - Hijri year calendar devised.
- 644 - Uthman ibn Affan becomes caliph.
- 656 - Ali becomes caliph and moves capital from Medina to Kufa.
- 661 - Umayyad Caliphate established; capital moved from Medina to Damascus.
- 662 - Marwan ibn al-Hakam becomes Governor of Madina.
- 683 - Medina sacked by Umayyads.
- 8th century - Sharia (Islamic law) codified in Medina.
- 706 - Umar ibn Abd al-Aziz becomes Governor of Madina.
- 707 - Al-Masjid al-Nabawi rebuilt.
- 763 - Medina slave rebellion.
- 975 - City wall built.
- 976 - Establishment of the Sharifate of Medina.
- 1162 - City wall expanded.
- 1266 - Volcanic eruption within an hour's distance.
- 1513 - Al-Hajjaria waqf (trust) incorporated.
- 1517 - Ottoman Turks in power.
- 1804 - Wahhabis in power.
- 1812 - November: Battle of Medina (1812); Turks in power.
- 1837 - Al-Masjid an-Nabawi dome painted green.
- 1872 - Medina becomes part of the Ottoman Hejaz Vilayet.
- 1896 - Telephone line installed.
- 1900 - Population (estimate): 16,000 to 20,000.

== 20th century ==
- 1908 - Hejaz Railway (Damascus-Medina) begins operating.
- 1916 - Siege of Medina begins.
- 1919 - January: Siege of Medina ends; Arabs in power.
- 1920 - Hejaz Railway (Damascus-Medina) stops operating.
- 1925 - Medina becomes part of the Kingdom of Saudi Arabia.
- 1937 - Italian-Muslim hospital founded.
- 1953 - Baqi Cemetery expanded.
- 1955 - Al-Masjid al-Nabawi enlarged.
- 1961 - Islamic University of Madinah established.
- 1974
  - Mohammad Airport opens.
  - Population: 198,186.
- 1985 - King Fahd Complex for the Printing of the Holy Quran begins operating.
- 1986 - Quba Mosque rebuilt.

== 21st century ==
- 2001 - 15 March: Chechen hijacking of Russian aircraft.
- 2003 - Taibah University established.
- 2006 - Hejaz Railway Museum opens.
- 2010 - Population: 1,100,093.
- 2014
  - 8 February: 2014 Medina hotel fire.
  - Air pollution in Medina reaches annual mean of 65 PM2.5 and 153 PM10, much higher than recommended.
- 2016 - 4 July: bombing at Prophet's Mosque.

== See also ==
- History of Medina
- Other names of Medina
- Timelines of other cities in Saudi Arabia: Jeddah, Mecca, Riyadh

== Bibliography ==
Published in 19th century

- Jedidiah Morse; Richard C. Morse (1823), "Medina", A New Universal Gazetteer (4th ed.), New Haven: S. Converse
- Josiah Conder (1830), "Medinah", Arabia, The Modern Traveller, vol. 4, London: J.Duncan
- Richard Burton (1857), "El Medinah", Personal Narrative of a Pilgrimage to el Medinah and Meccah (2nd ed.), London: Longman, Brown, Green, Longmans, and Roberts, OCLC 5778233
- "Medina". American Cyclopedia. D. Appleton & Company. 1879.

Published in 20th century

- Smith, William Robertson (1910). "Medina" . Encyclopædia Britannica. Vol. 18 (11th ed.). pp. 64–66.
- Philip Khuri Hitti (1973). "Medina". Capital Cities of Arab Islam. University of Minnesota Press. p. 33+. ISBN 978-0-8166-0663-4.
- Richard Bayley Winder (1984). "Al-Madina". Encyclopedia of Islam. Leiden: Brill. pp. 997–1007.
- Muhammad ibn Jarir al-Tabari (1987). The Foundation of the Community: Muhammad At Al-Madina A.D. 622-626/Hijrah-4 A.H. History of al-Tabari. Vol. 7. M. V. McDonald, translator; W. Montgomery Watt, annotator. State University of New York Press. ISBN 0-88706-344-6. (written in 9th/10th century)
- Andrew Petersen (1996). "Medina". Dictionary of Islamic Architecture. Routledge. p. 182. ISBN 978-1-134-61365-6.
- Noelle Watson, ed. (1996). "Medina". International Dictionary of Historic Places: Middle East and Africa. UK: Routledge. pp. 487+. ISBN 1884964036.
- Werner Ende (1997). "The Nakhāwila, a Shite Community in Medina Past and Present". Die Welt des Islams. 37 (3): 263–348. doi:10.1163/1570060972597020. JSTOR 1570656.
- Stefano Bianca (2000), "Case Study 1: The Holy Cities of Islam - The Impact of Mass Transportation and Rapid Urban Change", Urban Form in the Arab World, Zurich: ETH Zurich, p. 218+, ISBN 3728119725, 0500282056
- John Block Friedman; Kristen Mossler Figg (2000). "Medina". Trade, Travel, and Exploration in the Middle Ages: An Encyclopedia. Routledge. p. 389. ISBN 978-1-135-59094-9.

Published in 21st century

- Richard C. Martín (2004). "Holy Cities: Medina". Encyclopedia of Islam & the Muslim World. Granite Hill Publishers. ISBN 978-0-02-865603-8.
- Josef W. Meri, ed. (2006). "Medina". Medieval Islamic Civilization. Routledge. ISBN 978-0-415-96691-7.
- C. Edmund Bosworth, ed. (2007). "Medina". Historic Cities of the Islamic World. Leiden: Koninklijke Brill. pp. 380–395. ISBN 978-9004153882.
- Michael R.T. Dumper; Bruce E. Stanley, eds. (2008), "Madinah", Cities of the Middle East and North Africa, Santa Barbara, USA: ABC-CLIO, p. 237+, ISBN 9781576079195
- Harry Munt (2014). The Holy City of Medina: Sacred Space in Early Islamic Arabia. Cambridge University Press. ISBN 978-1-139-99272-5.
