= Hartwig Fischer =

German art historian and ex-museum director

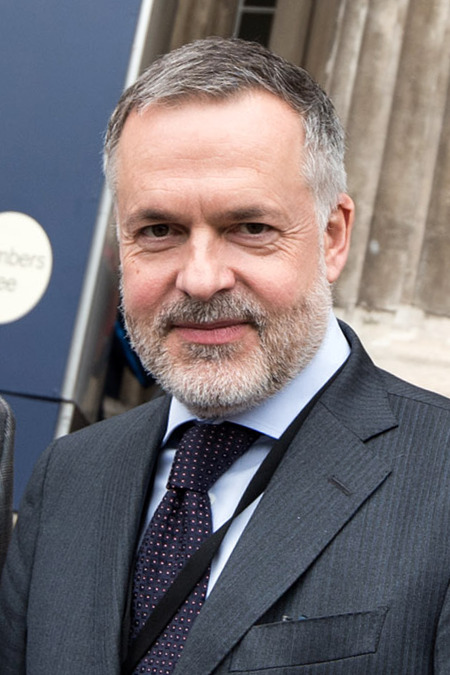
- Fischer in 2017
- Born: 14 December 1962 (age 63); Hamburg, West Germany
- Education: Munich University of Applied Sciences; University of Bonn (Ph.D.)
- Occupation: Art historian
- Known for: Director of the British Museum
- Predecessor: Neil MacGregor
- Successor: Nicholas Cullinan

Hartwig Fischer (born 14 December 1962) is a German art historian and museum director. From April 2016 until his resignation in August 2023 following a theft scandal, he was the director of the British Museum, the first non-British head of the museum since 1866. From 2012 to 2016, he was director of the Dresden State Art Collections (Staatliche Kunstsammlungen Dresden).

== Early life and education ==
Fischer was born on 14 December 1962 in Hamburg, West Germany. His father came from Mecklenburg. As a child, Fischer glimpsed art galleries while visiting relatives farther to the south, in Dresden in then-separate East Germany. He undertook postgraduate research on Hermann Prell, for which he received a doctorate degree from the University of Bonn (Universität Bonn) in 1994. He is a German native speaker and fluent in English, French and Italian.

== Career ==
Fischer began his career at the Kunstmuseum Basel, an art museum in Basel, Switzerland. There, between 2001 and 2006, he was curator of 19th-century and modern art. He became director of the Museum Folkwang in Essen in 2006 where he presided over a period of expansion. In December 2011, he was appointed director of the Dresden State Art Collections (Staatliche Kunstsammlungen Dresden). Subsequently, he succeeded Martin Roth, after Roth left to take charge at the Victoria and Albert Museum in London.

=== British Museum ===
On 25 September 2015, the trustees of the British Museum announced that Fischer would be the museum's next director. He was the first non-British head of the museum since the Italian Sir Anthony Panizzi stood down in 1866. He took up the appointment on 4 May 2016.

In his role as director, Fischer supported the museum's continued ownership of the Elgin Marbles, which were removed from the Acropolis in Athens by agents of Lord Elgin from 1799 to 1810. In January 2019, Fischer gave an interview to a Greek newspaper (in English) in which he called the removal of the marbles a "creative act", reaffirmed the British Museum's position of not loaning them to other museums, and stated that they were owned by the museum's trustees, rather than by the people of Athens. The Greek Minister of Culture and Sports, Myrsini Zorba, said in response that Fischer's comments "ignore the international debate and the Declarations of Unesco", while George Vardas, the secretary of the International Association for the Reunification of the Parthenon Sculptures, described Fischer's views as "astonishing historical revisionism and arrogance". In December 2022, it was reported in the British press that the British Museum had entered into talks with the Greek government for the permanent return of the Parthenon Marbles to Athens.

In July 2023, Fischer announced that he would step down as director in 2024. In August 2023, he resigned due to the museum's response to thefts and announced that he would step down once the museum had set up an interim director. A staff member had previously been dismissed over the theft over several years of small works of art, mostly classical engraved gems.

=== Museum of World Cultures ===
In July 2024 Fischer was announced as the director of the proposed Museum of World Cultures which is presently under construction in Riyadh.

== Selected works ==
- Fischer, Hartwig; Rainbird, Sean, eds. (2006). Kandinsky: The path to abstraction. London: Tate Publishing. ISBN 978-1854376770.
- Fischer, Hartwig (2013). Georg Baselitz: Hintergrundgeschichten (in German). München: Hirmer. ISBN 978-3777421667.
- Fischer, Hartwig (2014). Bernhard Maaz: Gemäldegalerie Alte Meister Dresden (in German). Köln: Verlag der Buchhandlung Walther Konig. ISBN 978-3863356125.
