= Museum of World Cultures =

The Museum of World Cultures is a museum under construction in Riyadh, Saudi Arabia. It will be situated within Royal Arts Complex of the King Salman Park. In 2024 Hartwig Fischer was appointed the director of the museum.

The museum and the surrounding Royal Arts Complex is being built to designs by Bofill Taller de Arquitectura. The museum is 110 meters in height. It is expected to open in 2026.
