= List of shopping malls in Saudi Arabia =

This is a list of shopping malls in Saudi Arabia, categorized by province.

== Riyadh Province ==
Riyadh

- Solitaire Mall (2025–present)
- Via Riyadh (2023–present)
- Park Avenue Mall (2022–present)
- The View Mall (2022–present)
- The Esplanade Mall (2021–present)
- U Walk (2019–present)
- Roshn Front (2019–present)
- Riyadh Park (2017–present)
- Al-Hamra Mall (2016–present)
- Al-Nakheel Mall (2014–present)
- Qasr Mall (2012–present)
- Al-Othaim Mall (2012–present)
- Salaam Mall (2012–present)
- Panorama Mall (2010–present)
- Khurais Mall (2008–present)
- Riyadh Gallery (2007–present)
- Hayat Mall (2007–present)
- Centria Mall (2006–present)
- Granada Center (2005–present)
- Kingdom Centre Mall (2001–present)
- Al-Faisaliah Mall (2000–present)
- Sahara Mall (1997–present)

== Mecca Province ==
Jeddah

- Westfield Jeddah (2026–present)
- U Walk Jeddah (2024–present)
- The Village Mall (2023–present)
- Cenomi Jeddah Park (2021–present)
- Al-Yasmeen Mall (2016–present)
- Al-Salam Mall (2012–present)
- Haifaa Mall (2011–present)
- Mall of Arabia (2008–present)
- Red Sea Mall (2008–present)
- Al-Andalus Mall (2007–present)
- Aziz Mall (2006–present)
- Serafi Mega Mall (2005–present)

== Future malls ==
- The Avenues – Riyadh
- The Avenues – Khobar
