= Granada Center =

Granada Mall
- غرناطة مول
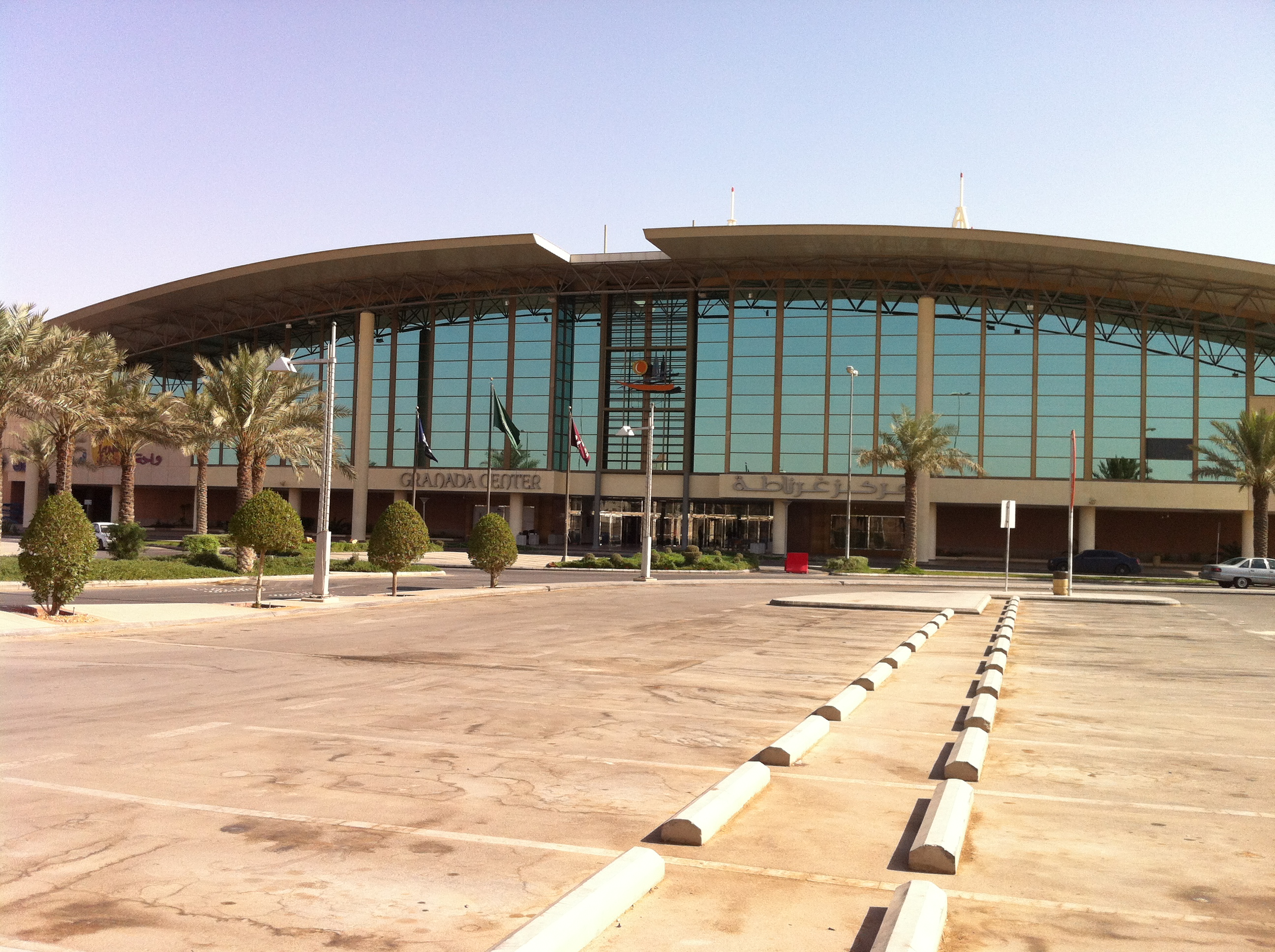
- Location: Riyadh, Saudi Arabia
- Coordinates: 24°46′54″N 46°43′52″E
- Address: Imam Abdullah bin Saud bin Abdulaziz, (between Exit 9 and East Ring Road), Shuhada District
- Manager: Mazen Hamza Qandeel
- Num. of stores: 340
- Website: www.granadamall.info

Granada Mall is a shopping mall located in the eastern ring road highway (airport direction) between exit 8-9 Ghernata District in Riyadh, Saudi Arabia. It occupies covered area of 150,000 m^{2} (1,600,000 sq ft). As of 2026, the centre houses over 300 retail locations.

It was built by Saudi Constructioneers (SAUDICO).

== Footbridges ==
The mall has two footbridges completed in 05/04/2026. One connects it to the Hilton Hotel, and the other connects it to the nearby metro station.

== See also ==
- List of shopping malls in Saudi Arabia
- Shopping Mall
