= Green Riyadh =

Landscaping project in Saudi Arabia

- الرياض الخضراء
- Location: Riyadh, Saudi Arabia
- Owner: Royal Commission for Riyadh City
- Founder: Salman bin Abdulaziz
- Established: 19 March 2019; 6 years ago
- Budget: $32 million
- Website: riyadhgreen.sa/en/

The Green Riyadh project is a large landscape-improving project in the capital city of Saudi Arabia, Riyadh. It is a project with an estimated budget US$32 Million. This project is part of four major projects to devolve the city ordered by the Crown Prince Mohamed bin Salaman bin Abdulaziz. It is one of many under the Saudi Vision 2030. The goal is to develop the city and be one of the top 100 cities in the world.

== Vision ==
The project would help to increase the green space per capita in the city by planting different plants across the city. The recycling water system is going to be used. The greening program would result in better air quality and decreased town temperatures.

== Forestation ==
The project has a goal of planting 7.2 million trees in different places around the city using 72 local tree species that can handle the heat and wind in Riyadh. The trees will be placed in schools, car parking sites, government facilities, healthcare facilities, universities, parks, Mosques, and roads, streets, and green belts of a specific length.

== Irrigation ==
The city uses about 90,000 cubic meters per day for irrigation and by the end of the project, it needs 1 million cubic meter per day. To achieve this a new sustainable irrigation system will be used.

== See also ==
- King Salman Park, a park located in Riyadh as a part of the Riyadh Green project. It is estimated to be five times bigger than London's Hyde Park, London and four times than the New York's Central Park.
