= Danube Company =

Supermarket and hypermarket chain in Saudi Arabia

Coordinates: 21°33′33″N 39°11′05″E

Danube Company Limited
- Company type: Retailers
- Industry: Hypermarket
- Founded: October 18, 1987; 38 years ago
- Headquarters: Jeddah, Saudi Arabia
- Key people: AbdulRazzaq BinDawood (Chairman), Ahmad AR. BinDawood (CEO)
- Products: Retail - Hypermarket
- Owner: Bindawood Holding
- Website: danube.sa

Danube Company Limited is a supermarket and hypermarket chain in Saudi Arabia. It is owned by BinDawood Holding, the grocery retail operator of hypermarkets and supermarkets in Saudi Arabia. Since becoming part of BinDawood Holding in 2001, Danube has grown to 47 current locations.

== Branches ==
Danube opened its first hypermarket at the Heraa International Mall in 1993 in Jeddah. Then, the branch moved to a hypermarket about 0.5 kilometres away from Heraa International Mall. Danube hypermarkets are located at Medina Road (originally Heraa International Mall), Serafi Megamall, Redsea Mall and at Central Park Mall Danube opened its first hypermarket in Riyadh's Hayat Mall in 2006 and built its second at Panorama Mall in 2010. Danube has 47 store locations across the Kingdom and Danube Online is live in Jeddah, Riyadh, Al Khobar, Dammam and Taif.

== Online presence ==
Danube Online was launched in 2017, a first mover in the eCommerce grocery space in Saudi Arabia, and available via digital platform and mobile app which offer fully integrated services. Danube Online delivers Danube grocery products in six cities across the Kingdom.

== Awards ==
- Danube Online and the Danube App awarded the Retail Technology Award at the 2018 Seamless Middle East Awards.
- the Danube Online won Digital Transformation of the Year by IDC Awards, 2019.
- The Award of the Store Manager Of the Year at the retail Middle East awards 2019.
- The Industry Excellence Award Food & Beverage at the Saudi Top Achiever Awards in March 2019.
- Danube Online is shortlisted to win The Retail Transformation and Reinvention Award at the World Retail Congress Awards in September 2020.
