= Riyadh Gallery Mall =

- الرياض جاليري مول
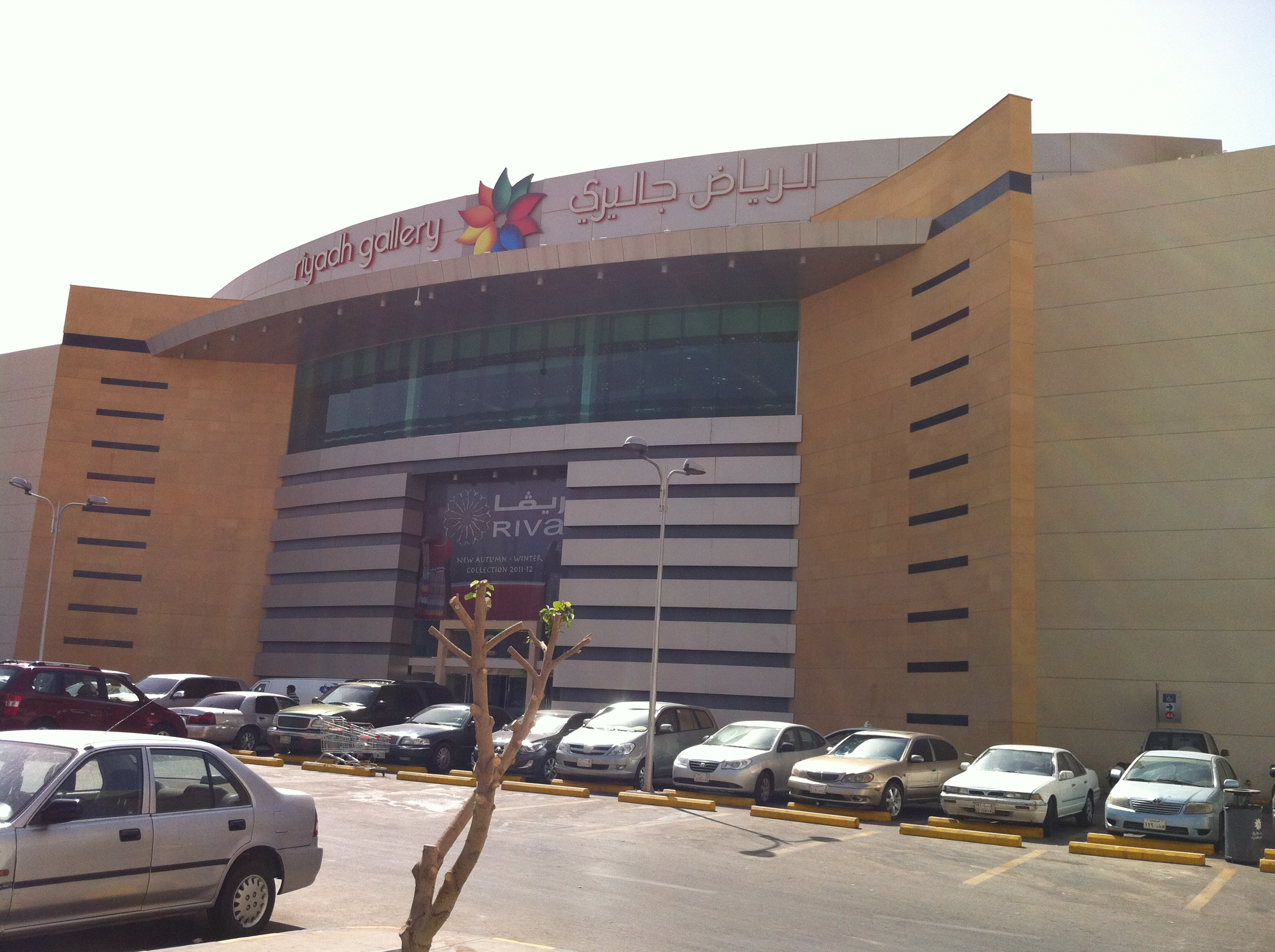
- Riyadh Gallery Mall, 2011
- Location: King Fahd District, Riyadh, Saudi Arabia
- Coordinates: 24°44′35″N 46°39′29″E
- Opened: 28 August 2007; 19 years ago
- Num. of stores: 170
- Floors: 4

Riyadh Gallery Mall (Arabic: الرياض جاليري مول), or simply Riyadh Gallery, is an indoor shopping center and a commercial complex located in the King Fahd District of Riyadh, Saudi Arabia. Inaugurated in 2007, it covers an area of almost 38 acres and was owned by Saudi businessman Sheikh Saleh al-Rajhi. It is among the most popular malls in Riyadh and includes several retail outlets, hypermarkets and department stores.

== History ==
In late July 2006, Al Jazirah newspaper reported that the Riyadh Gallery Mall has neared eighty percent of its completion, and the Sheikh Saleh Bin Abdul Aziz Al Rajhi Business Council has decided to launch the shopping complex on August 28, 2007 (15 Sha'ban 1428). The mall was auctioned in 2019.

== Design ==
The complex has 4 floors and 170 stores in total. It has 7 gates for entrance and exit.

== See also ==
- List of shopping malls in Saudi Arabia
