= Sahara Mall =

Shopping mall in Riyadh, Saudi Arabia

- صحارى مول
- Location: Riyadh, Saudi Arabia
- Coordinates: 24°44′19″N 46°40′58″E
- Opened: December 1997
- Num. of stores: 180
- Website: www.saharamall.com.sa

Riyadh Sahara Mall (Arabic: صحارى مول) is a shopping mall in the King Fahd Quarter of Riyadh, Saudi Arabia. It has 180 shops, Cinema, a children's playground, Casual Dinning Restaurants, Food court, cafeteria, skylights, fountains, gardens etc.

== See also ==
- List of shopping malls in Saudi Arabia
