= List of lighthouses in Saudi Arabia =

The total length of the Saudi Arabian coastline is 2,640 kilometres (1,640 mi), with two coastlines: a long west coast on the Red Sea and a shorter east coast on the Persian Gulf.

As of 2010, active lighthouses in Saudi Arabia are maintained by the Saudi Ports Authority. There are about 633 navigational aids, of which 72% are solar-powered.

The lighthouses of Saudi Arabia are listed in the National Geospatial-Intelligence Agency List of Lights publication 112. They are listed by the United Kingdom Hydrographic Office on volume E of the Admiralty List of Lights & Fog Signals. They are also listed on The Lighthouse Directory and on the ARLHS World List of Lights.

This list is based on The Lighthouse Directory.

== Red Sea lighthouses ==
- Jaza'ir Sila Light - about 25 kilometres (16 mi) west of Al Muwaylih, 27°39′9.15″N 35°16′43.84″E
- Schermo Reef Light - about 25 kilometres (16 mi) west of Yanbu, 24°3′17.47″N 37°51′34.29″E
- Yanbu South Light - southern approach channel to the port of Yanbu, about 65 kilometres (40 mi) south southeast of Yanbu, 23°28.1′N 38°25.5′E
- Shib al Khamsa Light - about 175 kilometres (109 mi) north of Jeddah, 22°44.7′N 38°37.4′E
- Jeddah Light - Jeddah, 21°28′7.14″N 39°8′58.98″E
- Mismari Reef Light - about 30 kilometres (19 mi) southwest of Jeddah, 21°19′26.73″N 39°1′55.03″E
- Jizan Light - Jizan, 16°53′6.43″N 42°31′46.36″E
- South Mazarkiff Light - Farasan Islands, 16°34.6′0″N 42°21.7′0″E

== Persian Gulf lighthouses ==
- Ra's Rakan Light - south of the King Fahd Causeway, 26°11.46′N 51°13.16′E
- Najwah Shoal Light - north end of a shoal off the entrance to Dammam, 26°34′N 50°15′E
- Abu Ali Light - about 35 kilometres (22 mi) north of Jubail, 27°18′N 49°44′E
- Al-Arabiyah Light - Al-'Arabiyah island, about 120 kilometres (75 mi) northeast of Jubail, 27°47′N 50°10′E
- Harqus West Light - Harqus sandbank, about 50 kilometres (31 mi) west northwest of Al-'Arabiyah, 27°56.1′N 49°41.1′E

== See also ==
- Lists of lighthouses and lightvessels
