= Timeline of Mecca =

The following is a timeline of the history of the city of Mecca, Saudi Arabia.

== Prior to 20th century ==
- 100 BCE - "Yemeni tribes of Judham rule Mecca."
- 570 CE - Year of the Elephant and the birth of Muhammad.
- 605 CE - Quraish rebuild Kaaba after it was damaged in floods.
- 613 CE - Muhammad starts preaching publicly in Mecca.
- 622 CE / 0-1 H - Muhammad migrates from Mecca to Medina, with followers (muhajirun).
- 7th C. - Masjid al-Haram architectural components began.
- 625-629 : Pilgrim mosques built in numerous countries like (Kerala) India & in China by early disciples of Muhammad.
  - Pilgrimage of Muslims to Mecca per Treaty of Hudaybiyyah.
  - 11 December: Liberation of Mecca.
- 683 / 63-64 H - Siege of Mecca (683); Kaaba burnt.
- 692 - Siege of Mecca (692).
- 751 - Milestones installed along the Darb Zubaidah (Baghdad-Mecca road).
- 793 - Harun al-Rashid visits city.
- 810 - Aqueduct built.
- 930 - City sacked by Qarmatians; Black Stone taken out of Mecca.
- 951 - Black Stone returned to Mecca "for a great ransom".
- 1184 - Traveller Ibn Jubayr visits city.
- 1265 - Egyptian Mamluks in power.
- 1326 - Traveller Ibn Battuta visits Mecca.
- 1517 - Ottomans in power; Selim I becomes Custodian of the Two Holy Mosques.
- 1630 - Flood.
- 1631 - Kaaba rebuilt.
- 1802/1803 - Mecca "captured by the Sa'udi-Wahhabi army."
- 1812/1813 - Wahhabis ousted by Egyptian forces.
- 1840 - Ottomans in power again.
- 1855 - The Hejaz rebellion takes place in Hejaz against the Ottoman Empire, and results in riots in both Mecca and Jeddah.
- 1878 - Population estimated by Assistant-Surgeon ʽAbd el-Razzāq at 50,000 to 60,000.
- 1880 - 21 March: Sharif assassinated.
- 1885 - Population: 45,000 (estimate).
- 1886 - Printing press in use (approximate date).

== 20th century ==
- 1908 / 1325-1326 H
  - September: Hejaz Railway (Damascus-Mecca) begins operating.
  - Hussein bin Ali becomes sharif.
  - Al-Hijaz government newspaper begins publication.
- 1912 - Madrasat al-Falah established.
- 1916 / 1334-1335 H
  - June–July: Battle of Mecca (1916).
  - Hashimite al-Qibla government newspaper begins publication.
- 1921 - Population: 80,000 (approximate estimate).
- 1924 / 1342-1343 H
  - Battle of Mecca (1924).
  - 12 December: Umm al-Qura government newspaper begins publication.
  - Population: 60,000 (approximate estimate).
  - Ali of Hejaz becomes sharif.
- 1925 - City becomes part of the Kingdom of Saudi Arabia.
- 1926 - Al Adl cemetery and al-Mahad al-Ilmi Suudi (school) established.
- 1929 - Amanat al-Asima (municipality) established.
- 1931 / 1349-1350 H - Public library founded (approximate date).
- 1932 - Dar al-Hadith (school) established.
- 1930s - Aziziyya, Faysaliyya, Khayriyya, and Suudiyya schools established (approximate date).
- 1938 - Maktabat al-Haram (library) active.
- 1941 - Flood
- 1945 - Al-Wehda Club (sport club) formed.
- 1949 / 1368-1369 H - Kulliyyat al-Sharia (college) established.
- 1951 - College of Education established.
- 1958 - Al Nadwa (newspaper) newspaper begins publication.
- 1960 - Police academy established.
- 1962
  - Slavery abolished.
  - Population: 158,908.
- 1964 / 1383-1384 H
  - Malcolm X visits city.
  - Masjid al-Haram expanded.
- 1966 - Mahad al-Nur (school) established.
- 1969 - Flood.
- 1972 - Hajj televised.
- 1973 - "Master Plan for the Holy City of Mecca" launched.
- 1974 - Population: 366,801.
- 1975 - Fire in Mina.
- 1979 - 20 November-4 December: Grand Mosque seizure.
- 1981 - Umm al-Qura University established.
- 1986 - King Abdul Aziz Stadium opens.
- 1987 - 31 July: 1987 Mecca incident.
- 1992 - Population: 965,697.
- 1997 - 16 April: Mecca fire of 1997.

== 21st century ==
- 2005 - April: 2005 Islamic Solidarity Games held in city.
- 2006 / 1426-1427 H
  - 5 January: 2006 Mecca hostel collapse.
  - 12 January: 2006 Hajj stampede.
  - December: Abraj al Bait Mall in business.
- 2007 - Jamaraat Bridge for pedestrians rebuilt.
- 2010
  - Al Mashaaer Al Mugaddassah Metro begins operating.
  - Makkah Clock Royal Tower Hotel in business.
  - 1,534,731.
- 2012
  - August: Fourth Extraordinary Session of the Islamic Summit Conference held in city.
  - Abraj Al Bait built.
- 2013 - Mishaal bin Abdullah Al Saud becomes governor of Mecca Province.
- 2014 / 1435-1436 H - Raffles Makkah Palace hotel and Swissôtel Makkah in business.
- 2015
  - 13 July: City visible via Snapchat imagery.
  - September: Mecca crane collapse.

== See also ==
- Mecca history
- List of sharifs of Mecca
- Timeline of Muhammad in Mecca
- Timeline of Islamic history
- Timelines of other cities in Saudi Arabia: Jeddah, Medina, Riyadh

== Bibliography ==
Published in 18th-19th centuries

- Carsten Niebuhr (1792). "Of the City of Mecca". Travels through Arabia. Translated by Robert Heron. Edinburgh: R. Morison and Son. hdl:2027/mdp.39015004297621 – via HathiTrust.
- Abraham Rees (1819), "Mecca", The Cyclopædia, London: Longman, Hurst, Rees, Orme & Brown, hdl:2027/mdp.39015054498178
- Jedidiah Morse; Richard C. Morse (1823), "Mecca", A New Universal Gazetteer (4th ed.), New Haven: S. Converse
- Johann Ludwig Burckhardt (1829). "(Mekka)". Travels in Arabia. London: H. Colburn. hdl:2027/mdp.39015010937236.
- Josiah Conder (1830), "Mekka", Arabia, The Modern Traveller, vol. 4, London: J.Duncan
- Richard Francis Burton (1855). Personal Narrative of a Pilgrimage to Al-Madinah & Meccah. 2. Vol. 1. Tylston and Edwards., v.2
- "Mecca". American Cyclopedia. D. Appleton & Company. 1879. hdl:2027/hvd.hn585p.
- Edward Balfour (1885), "Mecca", Cyclopaedia of India (3rd ed.), London: B. Quaritch
- Christiaan Snouck Hurgronje (1888). Mekka (in German). The Hague: Martinus Nijhoff.

Published in 20th century

- "Mecca", Chambers's Encyclopaedia, London: W. & R. Chambers, 1901, hdl:2027/uc2.ark:/13960/t3bz6g65j
- Smith, William Robertson (1910). "Mecca" . Encyclopædia Britannica. Vol. 17 (11th ed.). pp. 950–955.
- Benjamin Vincent (1910), "Mecca", Haydn's Dictionary of Dates (25th ed.), London: Ward, Lock & Co., hdl:2027/loc.ark:/13960/t89g6g776 – via HathiTrust
- "Mecca". Encyclopædia of Islam. Leiden: E.J. Brill. 1934. pp. 438+. ISBN 9004097910.
- Gerald de Gaury (1954). Rulers of Mecca. New York: Roy Publishers. (fulltext)
- Philip Khuri Hitti (1973). "Mecca". Capital Cities of Arab Islam. University of Minnesota Press. p. 3+. ISBN 978-0-8166-0663-4.
- Francis Edward Peters (1986). Jerusalem and Mecca: The Typology of the Holy City in the Near East. New York University Press. ISBN 978-0-8147-6598-2.
- Patricia Crone (1987). Meccan Trade and the Rise of Islam. Princeton University Press.
- Francis Edward Peters. Mecca: A Literary History of the Muslim Holy Land, Princeton University Press, ISBN 0-691-03267-X (1994)
- Pam Hollister (1996). "Mecca". In Noelle Watson (ed.). International Dictionary of Historic Places: Middle East and Africa. UK: Routledge. pp. 483–486. ISBN 1884964036.
- Stefano Bianca (2000), "Case Study 1: The Holy Cities of Islam – The Impact of Mass Transportation and Rapid Urban Change", Urban Form in the Arab World, Zurich: ETH Zurich, ISBN 3728119725, 0500282056
- Marina A. Tolmacheva (2000). "Mecca". In John Block Friedman; Kristen Mossler Figg (eds.). Trade, Travel, and Exploration in the Middle Ages: an Encyclopedia. Routledge. p. 387+. ISBN 978-1-135-59094-9.

Published in 21st century

- Josef W. Meri, ed. (2006). "Mecca". Medieval Islamic Civilization. Routledge. ISBN 978-0-415-96691-7.
- C. Edmund Bosworth, ed. (2007). "Mecca". Historic Cities of the Islamic World. Leiden: Koninklijke Brill. pp. 354+. ISBN 978-9004153882.
- Michael R.T. Dumper; Bruce E. Stanley, eds. (2008), "Makkah", Cities of the Middle East and North Africa, Santa Barbara, USA: ABC-CLIO
- Gabor Agoston; Bruce Alan Masters (2009). "Mecca". Encyclopedia of the Ottoman Empire. Facts on File. p. 354. ISBN 978-1-4381-1025-7.
- Ziauddin Sardar (2014). "Chronology". Mecca: The Sacred City. Bloomsbury. p. 365+. ISBN 978-1-62040-266-5.
