= Mall of Arabia (Jeddah) =

Mall of Arabia مجمع العرب
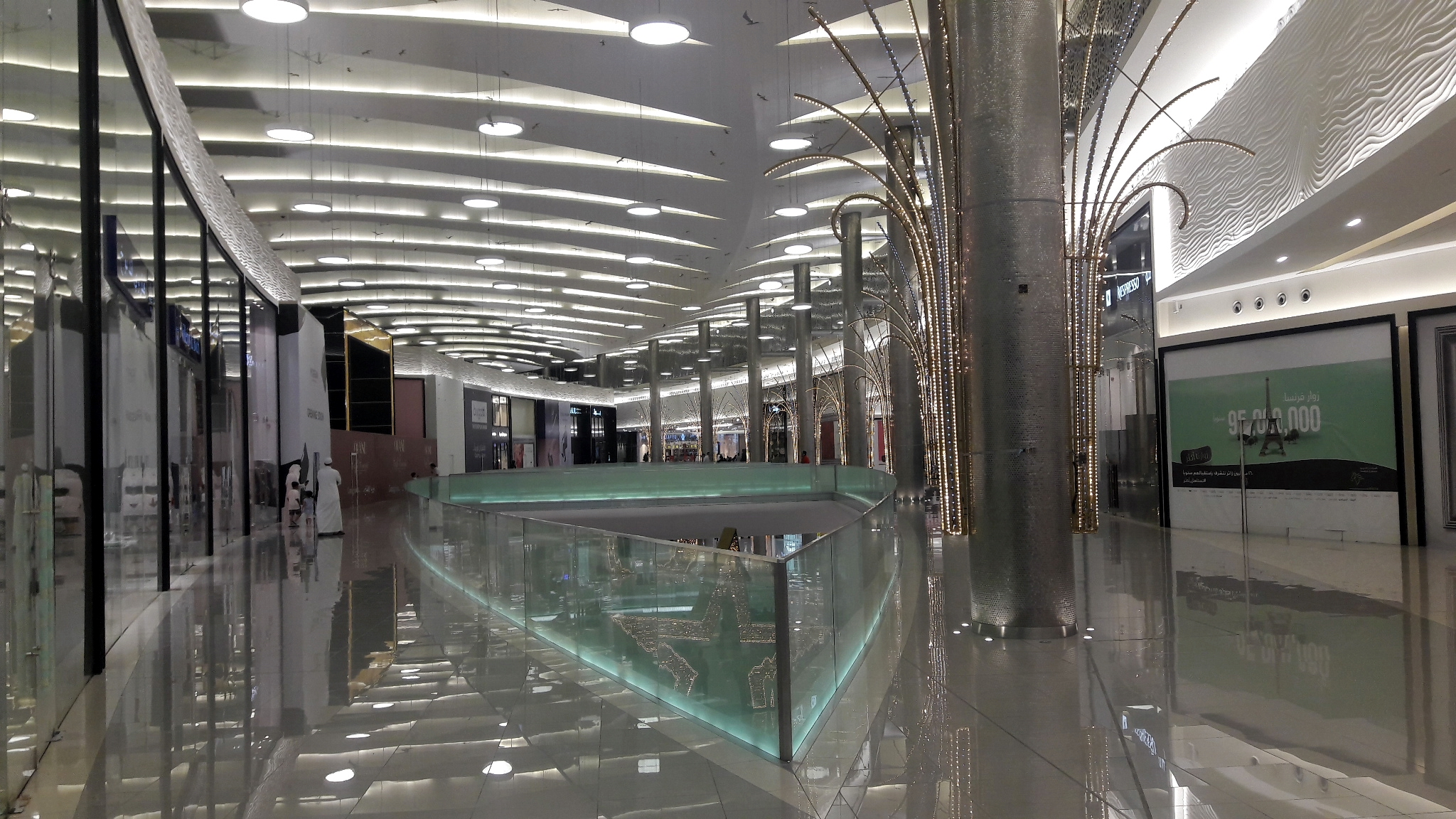
- The inside of Mall of Arabia
- Location: Jeddah, Saudi Arabia
- Coordinates: 21°37′57″N 39°9′26″E
- Opened: October 2008
- Developer: Cenomi
- Owner: Fawwaz Al-Hokair
- Floors: 3
- Website: mallofarabia.com.sa

The Mall of Arabia is a shopping mall located in Jeddah in the Kingdom of Saudi Arabia. The mall is located on the eastern side of the Medina Road and south of Makkah Road, near the King Abdulaziz International Airport. The mall has an area of 261,000 square meters. It also contains Kidzania Jeddah.

== See also ==
- List of shopping malls in Saudi Arabia
- Mall of Arabia (Dubai)
- Red Sea Mall
