= Hermann Prell =

German painter

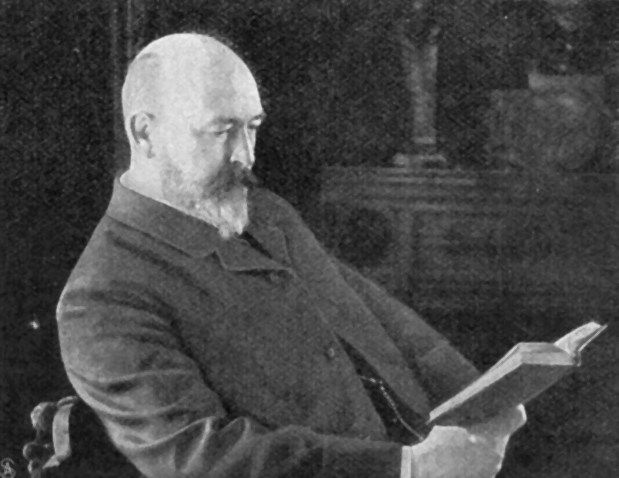
Hermann Prell, photograph from Die Gartenlaube (1904)

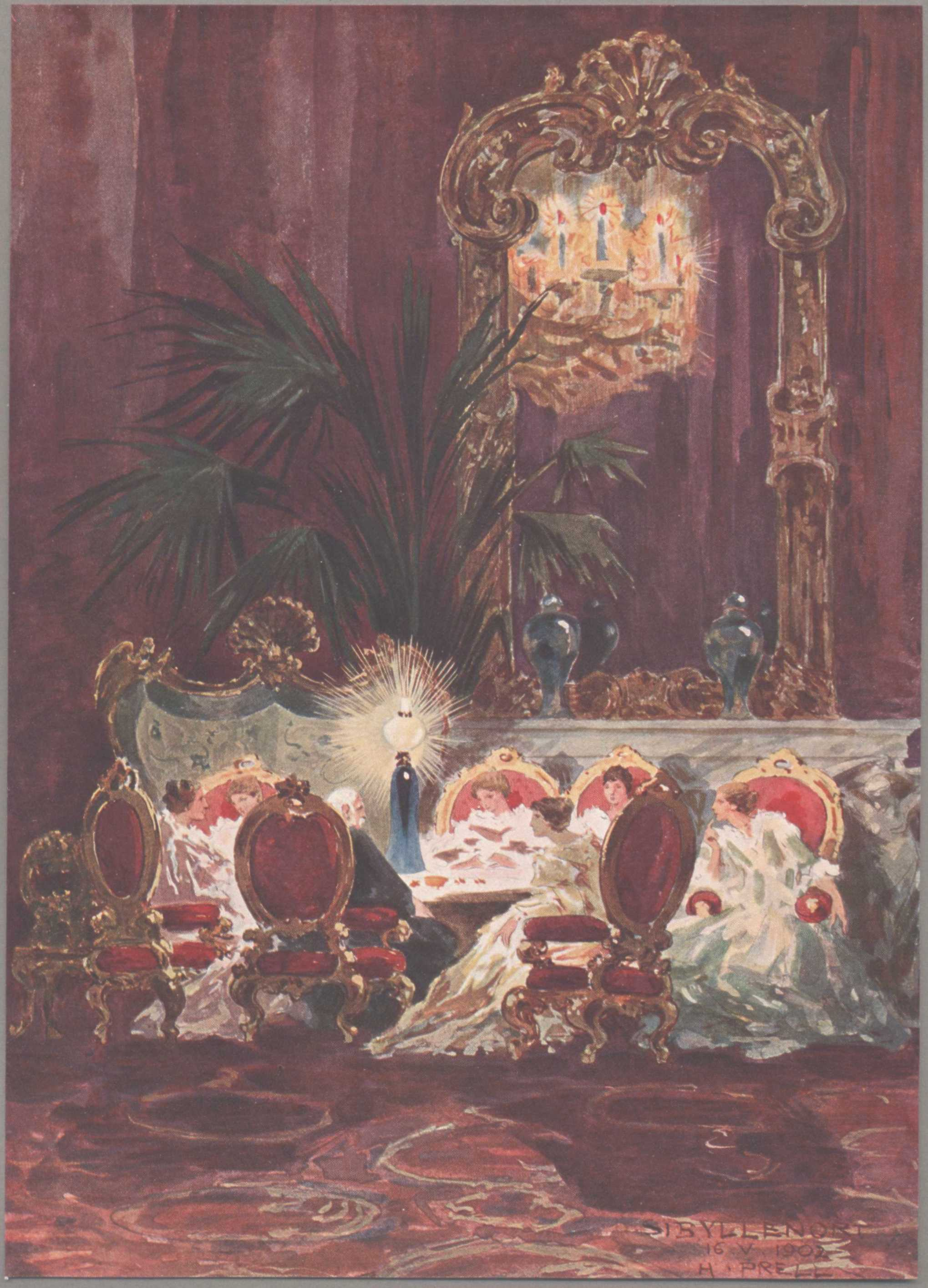
King Albert in Sibyllenort

Hermann Prell (29 April 1854 – 18 May 1922) was a German history painter, sculptor and professor at the Dresden Academy of Fine Arts.

== Life and work ==
He was born at Leipzig and studied under Theodor Grosse in Dresden and Karl Gussow in Berlin, then went to Italy to study fresco painting with Hans von Marées, in which style he produced the bulk of his works, despite Marées skepticism regarding his talent. Arnold Böcklin was also a major influence.

He became a teacher at the Prussian Academy of Art in 1886. That same year, he married Sophie Sthamer, who was also a painter. In 1892, he was appointed a Professor at the Dresden Academy of Fine Arts and remained there until his retirement in 1914.

He ranks as one of the foremost German historical painters of his time. He is especially known for his successful use of casein colors in fresco. In later life, he executed sculptures and collaborated on several projects with Otto Lessing, Christian Behrens and Alfred Messel. He maintained a studio in a villa on the banks of Elbe from 1897 until his death in Loschwitz in 1922.

Many of his works, especially his easel paintings, were destroyed during the fire-bombing of Dresden in 1945.

His brother was the landscape painter, Walter Prell and his son, Heinrich was a zoologist.

== Notable works ==
- Eleven murals symbolizing the "Principal Epochs in the History of Architecture" (1881–82, Banquet Hall, Architects' Union, Berlin)
- "Justice" and "Valor" and "Henry IV Granting Privileges to Worms in 1074" (City Hall, Worms)
- Cycles of historic episodes and allegorical scenes, respectively, in the city halls at Hildesheim (1888–91) and Danzig (1896) and over the staircase of the Breslau Museum (1894)
- Mythological scenes and sculptures in the Albertinum (1901–05) and the City Hall, Dresden (1908–12), and a frieze with subjects from Norse mythology in the throne room of the German Embassy in Rome.

== Sources and further reading ==
- Hartwig Fischer: Ein Wilhelminisches Gesamtkunstwerk auf dem Kapitol. Hermann Prell und die Einrichtung des Thronsaals in der Deutschen Botschaft zu Rom 1894–1899. Hamburg 1998.
- Christel Wünsch: Hermann Prell. In: Die Kunst hat nie ein Mensch allein besessen. Dreihundert Jahre Akademie der Künste und Hochschule der Künste Berlin. Catalog of the Berlin Art Academy, 1996, S. 317–319.
- Adolf Rosenberg: Prell. Bielefeld 1901
- Galland, Georg: Hermann Prell; fresken, skulpturen und tafelbilder des meisters, Charlottenburg, Amelang’sche kunsthandlung 1904
