= King Salman Park =

World's largest park under construction in Riyadh, Saudi Arabia

- حديقة الملك سلمان

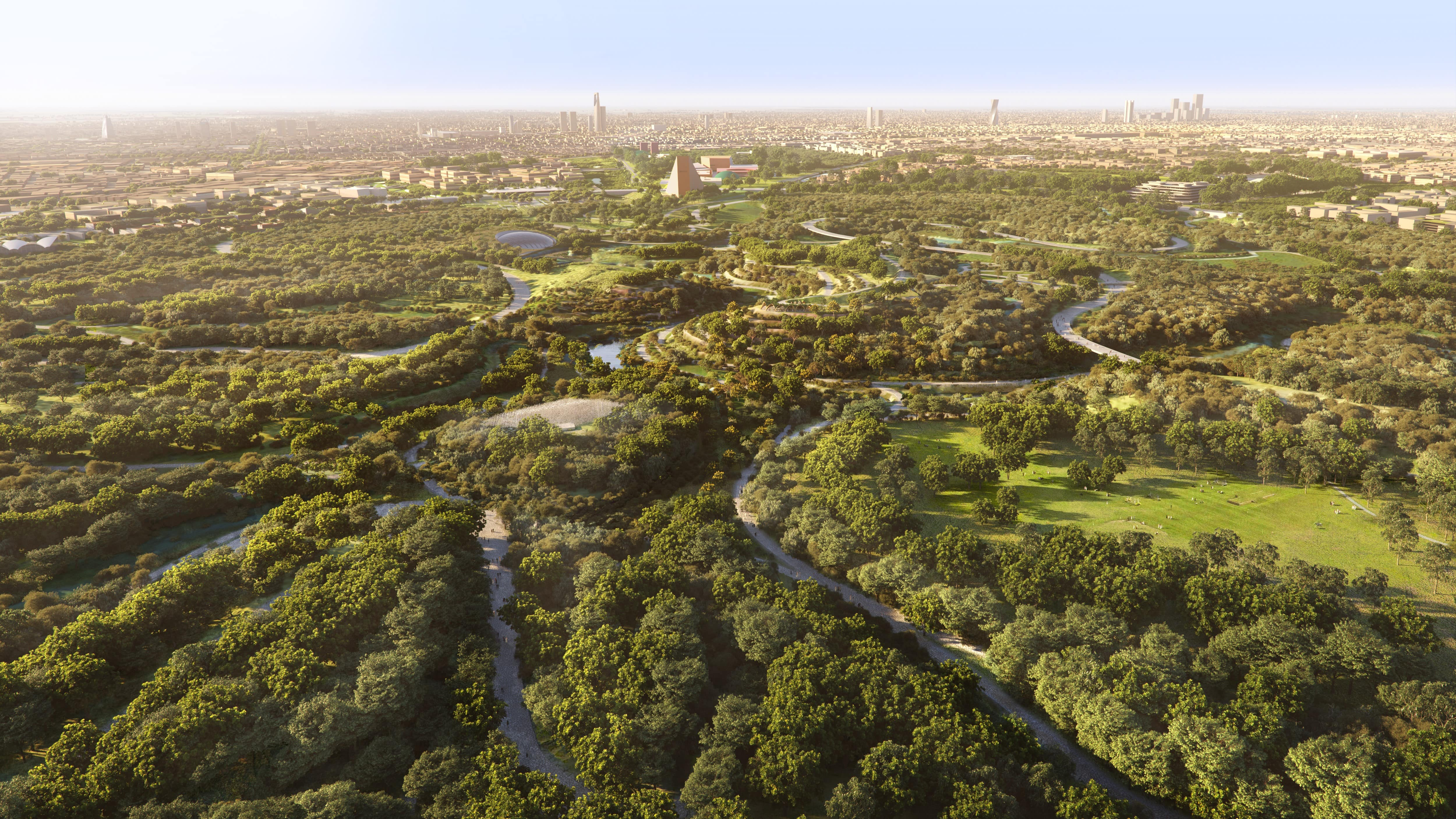
- Concept image of King Salman Park
- Interactive map of King Salman Park
- Type: Urban park
- Location: Riyadh, Saudi Arabia
- Coordinates: 24.719°N 46.724°E
- Area: 16.6 square kilometres (6.4 sq mi)
- Created: 19 March 2019
- Founder: Mohammed bin Salman
- Owner: King Salman Park Foundation
- Operator: King Salman Park Foundation
- Website: kingsalmanpark.sa

King Salman Park (KSP; Arabic: حديقة الملك سلمان), one of Riyadh’s mega-projects, is an urban area being developed in the city of Riyadh, Saudi Arabia under the supervision of the King Salman Park Foundation. It was unveiled in 2019 as part of the Green Riyadh initiative aimed at increasing the green space of Riyadh. It is being built on the grounds of the former Riyadh Air Base with an area totaling more than 17.2 sq km. Upon completion, it is expected to be one of the largest urban parks in the world, with a planned area five times that of Hyde Park in London and four times that of Central Park in New York. The park is named after King Salman bin Abdulaziz Al-Saud, who has ruled Saudi Arabia since 2015. Construction contracts for King Salman Park were awarded in 2021.

== History ==
In March 2019, King Salman of Saudi Arabia announced the King Salman Park project, introduced as part of an initiative led by Crown Prince Mohammed bin Salman. It is one of four major development projects, including Sports Boulevard, Green Riyadh, and Riyadh Art, proposed for Riyadh in support of Saudi Vision 2030. After winning an international competition, Omrania and Associates was named as the lead design consultant for the project, and it was announced it would be collaborating with Henning Larsen Architects on the master plan.

According to project plans, the park is intended to contribute to sustainable development and climate improvement and provide up to 70,000 new jobs, supporting the goals of the Kingdom’s Vision 2030. The project is expected to cost $23 billion in government funding and leverage $15 billion in private sector investment.

Construction began in late 2021 with more than US$1 billion in contracts awarded by the King Salman Park Foundation.

In September 2023, the King Slman Park Foundation partnered with Saudi developer Naif Al Rajhi Investment Company to launch a SAR4 billion ($1.1 billion) real estate development fund that would manage plots of land within the park.

It was also announced in September 2023 that Saudi Fransi Capital would be partnering with the head developer of the project, King Salman Park Company for Investment and Real Estate Development, to manage the real estate development fund. The partnership was reported as the first ever partnership between the Saudi government and the private sector.

The King Salman Park Foundation Board of Directors announced the completion of the Abu Bakr Al-Siddiq Tunnel on February 28, 2024. The tunnel opened to the public the following day and was the first component of the park’s project plan to be completed since breaking ground in 2021. It stands as one of the longest tunnels in the Middle East.

In November 2025, it was reported that the King Salman Park Foundation would be partnering with Ajdan Real Estate Development Company and SEDCO Capital to establish a SAR3.8 billion ($1 billion) fund to develop residential, commercial, and hospitality aspects of the project.

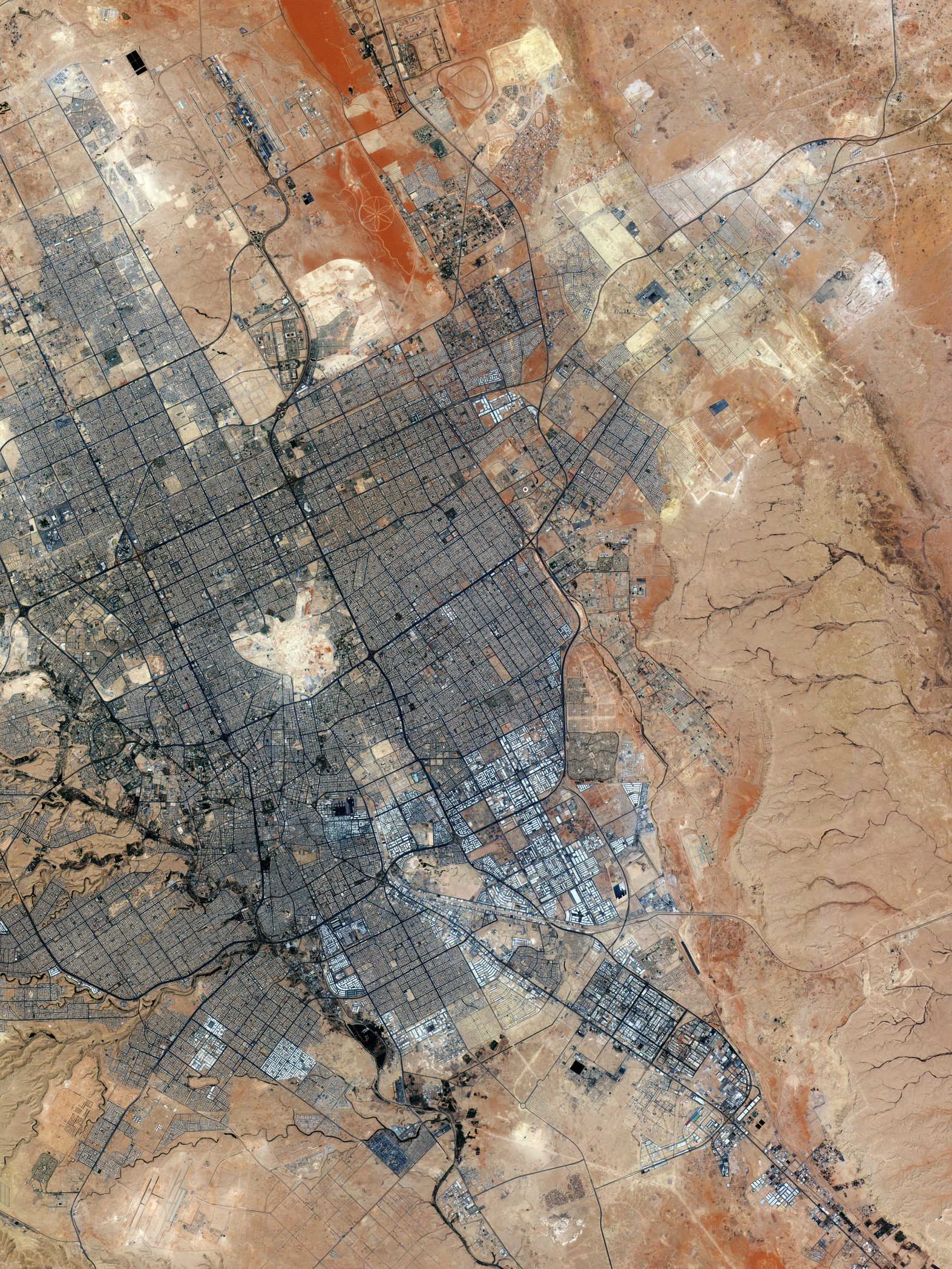
King Salman Park, located in the middle of Riyadh, seen from space.

== The King Salman Park Foundation ==
The King Salman Park Foundation, whose Board of Directors is chaired by Crown Prince Mohammed bin Salman bin Abdulaziz, oversees the implementation and operation of the park and manages its investments. According to the foundation, the project is intended to enhance the quality of life in Riyadh by increasing green space and supporting a more sustainable environment, as well as by providing cultural, artistic, recreational, and sporting facilities. It also seeks to raise Riyadh’s position in global rankings of the world’s most livable cities.

In December 2022, George Tanasijevich, the former president of Marina Bay Sands in Singapore, was appointed CEO of the King Salman Park Foundation.

== Design and architecture ==
In September 2021, it was announced the King Salman Park Foundation had awarded $1 billion in contracts to a group of national companies, coinciding with the start of construction. The park is located on the site of the former Riyadh Airport (King Salman Air Base). According to project plans, it will be served by five stations on the Green Line of the Riyadh Metro, ten stations on the Riyadh bus network, and six main roads, which are intended to facilitate access from different parts of the city.

Project plans report that a traffic-free path will form a 7.2-km (4.5-mile) “urban loop” for walking, cycling, and autonomous modes of public transportation. The park landscape is planned to include valley pathways, up to 30 meters (98 ft) deep, creating shaded areas and incorporating visitor facilities.

The initial plans for the project included a central park with more than 11 sq. km of green space, surrounded by areas planned for over 160 features and attractions covering art, culture, sports, and entertainment. In alignment with Saudi Vision 2030, the park was also designed to include multiple urban facilities, including playgrounds, sports complexes, and cultural venues such as the Royal Arts Complex and the Visitor Pavilion.

=== The Royal Arts Complex ===
Concept of the complete Royal Arts Complex

In May 2022, it was announced that the King Salman Park Foundation had started construction on the Royal Arts Complex. The Royal Arts Complex is planned to be located on an area of more than 500,000 square meters. It was designed by the architecture firm Ricardo Bofill Taller de Arquitectura with a design inspired by Salmani architectural principles.

The complex is intended to act as an arts and culture hub in the city of Riyadh and is planned to contain several cultural, recreational, and artistic facilities, including:

- The Museum of World Cultures - 110 m tall
- The National Theater - 2,300 seat capacity
- The Royal Institute of Traditional Arts - includes three academies: the Academy of Traditional Visual Arts, the Academy of Cultural Heritage and Restoration, and the Academy of Performing Arts
- Sculpture hall
- Medium capacity theater with 650 seats
- Three cinema halls
- The Dome - a spheroid structure containing works of art
- Arts and culture library - containing more than 250,000 books

As of March 2024, King Salman Park Foundation’s executive director of Project & Construction Management, Abdullah Allohaidan, stated that overall construction of the complex was 48% completed.

=== Visitor Pavilion ===
The King Salman Park Foundation announced in January 2022 the start of construction of the Visitor Pavilion. The Visitor Pavilion is planned as an environmental and cultural center built on an area of 90,000 square meters that includes interactive displays to introduce the park’s natural, cultural, and recreational features. The project, undertaken by the architect, David Adjaye, used Salmani architecture principles in its design. The Pavilion facilities include:

- A plant nursery
- A terrace with a 360-degree view of the park
- A main auditorium for events and entertainment with multiple runways
- A multi-use hall
- Meeting rooms
- Exhibition halls
- Several restaurants and cafes

== Environmental and sustainability features ==
=== Green space and biodiversity ===
The park is planned to cover approximately 16 sq. km, with over 11 sq. km dedicated to green spaces. The plan calls for around 1 million trees and includes landscaped gardens, forests, meadows, a valley area with several bodies of water, and naturalistic landscaping intended to support biodiversity and provide habitats for birds and other urban wildlife.

=== Water management ===
The project plan for the park incorporates the reuse of water for irrigation, water recycling systems, and the creation of water features that promote water conservation and support plant life.

=== Climate and energy sustainability ===
According to Rukn Eldeen Mohammed, the Special Projects Director at Omrania, the park was designed to address challenges related to the desert climate of Riyadh. Project plans included eco-friendly features such as rainwater harvesting and energy-efficient systems, as well as passive cooling strategies, shading, and the planting of trees in an effort to reduce the urban heat island effect.

=== Contribution to national initiatives ===
King Salman Park aligns with Saudi Arabia’s broader environmental and sustainability objectives, including the Saudi Green Initiative (SGI) and Vision 2030 goals. The park contributes to efforts to reduce carbon emissions, restore degraded land, and enhance the quality of life in Riyadh. According to project plans, the park is expected to expand the city’s green space from 1.5% to 9.1%.

== See also ==
- Green Riyadh
- List of Saudi Vision 2030 projects
