= Serafi Mega Mall =

- صيرفي ميقا مول
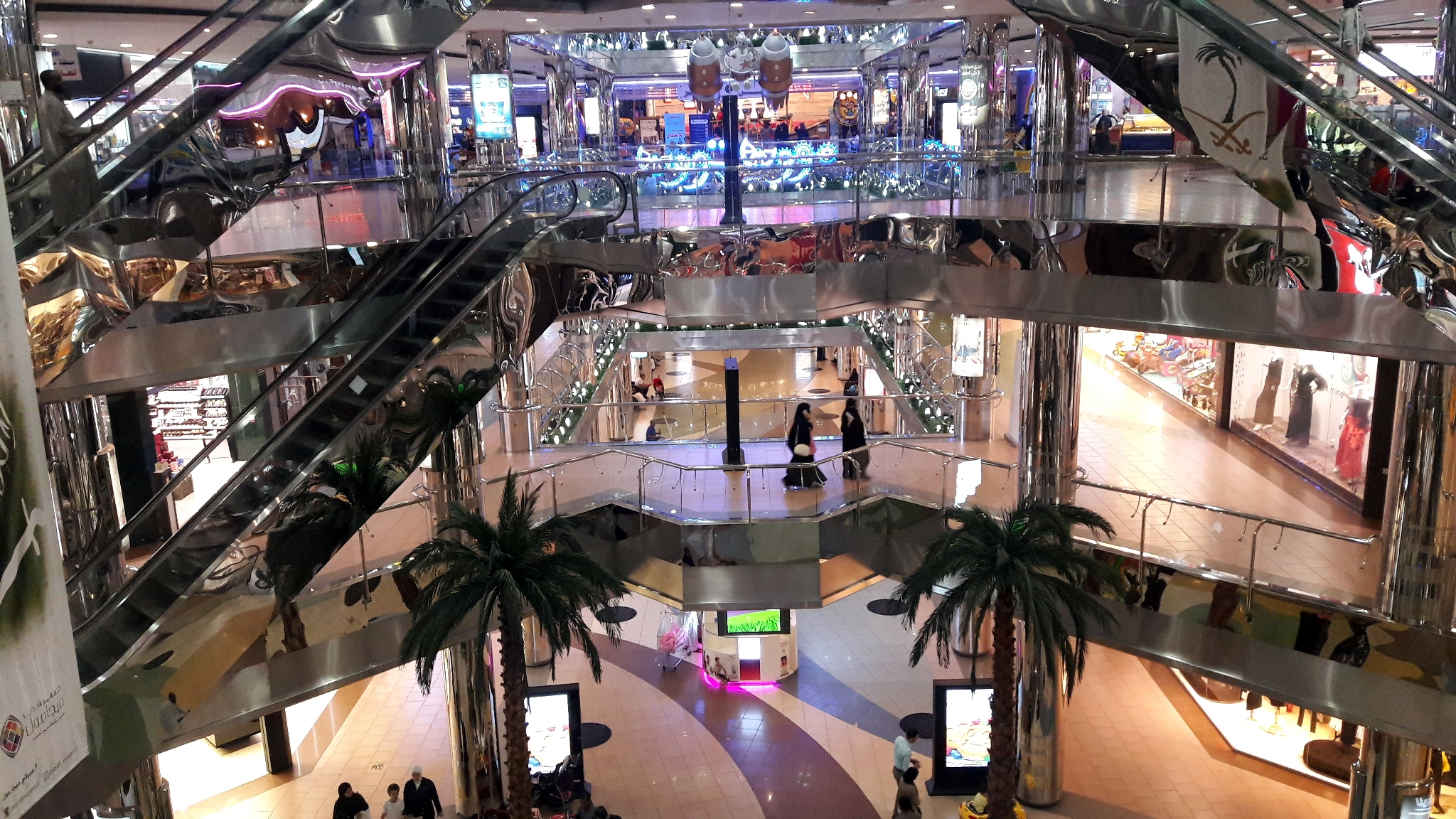
- Location: Jeddah, Saudi Arabia
- Coordinates: 21°33′36″N 39°11′06″E
- Opened: 18 May 2005
- Developer: Rikaz Development Co.
- Architect: Abnia Design Consultants
- Num. of stores: 200 (2005)
- Floor area: 100,000 m^{2} (1,100,000 sq ft) (2005)
- Floors: 4

Serafi Mega Mall is a shopping mall on the corner of Tahlia Street and 60th street in Jeddah, Saudi Arabia. It hosts two gaming areas, In10So and MoonToon, that feature Arcade Games, Escape Hunt, Laser Tag, Kart Racing, Bowling and Archery.

The building has a L-shaped layout with shops arranged along a central "spine". A 16,000 sq ft (1,500 m^{2}) Danube hypermarket is one anchor. The other anchor is a six-story office building. The project cost was $100 million

== See also ==
- List of shopping malls in Saudi Arabia
