= Jeddah Light =

Tower in Jeddah, Saudi Arabia

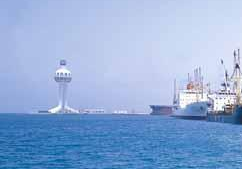
- Location: Jeddah, Saudi Arabia
- Coordinates: 21°28′07″N 39°08′59″E

Tower
- Constructed: 1990
- Foundation: concrete
- Construction: concrete and steel tower
- Height: 131.4 m (431 ft)
- Shape: cylindrical tower with a spheric observation building with balcony on the top
- Markings: white tower

Light
- Focal height: 137 m (449 ft)
- Range: 25 nmi (46 km; 29 mi)
- Characteristic: Fl(3) W 20s

Jeddah Light is an observation tower, port control tower and active lighthouse in Jeddah, Saudi Arabia. With a height of 431 ft (131.4 m), it "has a credible claim to be the world's tallest light tower". It is located at the end of the outer pier on the north side of the entrance to Jeddah Seaport.

== See also ==
- List of lighthouses in Saudi Arabia
