= Tuwaiq Palace =

- قصر طويق
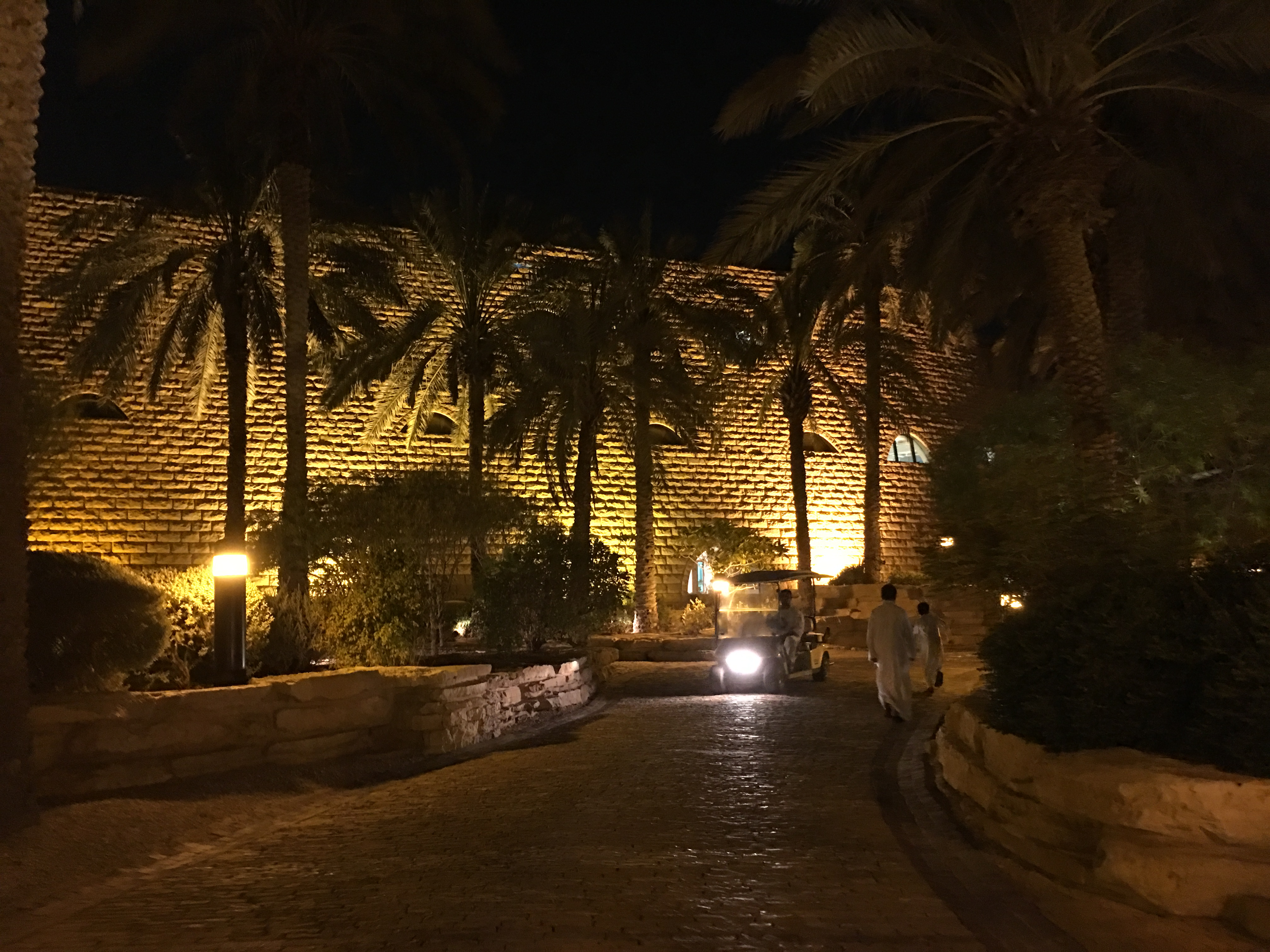
- Tuwaiq Palace
- Alternative names: Towaiq Palace; Diplomatic Club

General information
- Type: Palace; event venue
- Location: Diplomatic Quarter, Riyadh, Saudi Arabia
- Coordinates: 24.688463°N 46.619539°E
- Completed: 1985

Design and construction
- Architect: OHO Joint Venture
- Awards: Aga Khan Award for Architecture, 1998

Tuwaiq Palace or Towaiq Palace is a building in the Diplomatic Quarter district of Riyadh, Saudi Arabia, which hosts government functions, state receptions, and cultural festivals that introduce Saudi arts and customs to the international community. Named after the nearby Tuwaiq mountain, it was built in 1985 by OHO Joint Venture, a team composed of Frei Otto, Buro Happold, and Omrania. Tuwaiq Palace won the Aga Khan Award for Architecture for the design in 1998.

== Architecture ==
After an international competition in 1981, Omrania and Associates in association with Frei Otto and Buro Happold were awarded the design and site supervision of what was then called the Diplomatic Club.

The Tuwaiq Palace is a response to the unique opportunities presented by the site, a design worthy of the promontory site overlooking the Wadi Hanifeh below. The building's design features a curving, 800-meter-long “Living Wall” that wraps around a garden, with five projecting tensile (tent) structures providing shade along the wall.

At the heart of the concept is the need for physical protection from the environment in contrast to the desire to view the unique panorama available from the site. The concept became one of a series of contrasts: light and heavy, garden and desert, modern and traditional technology, openness and solidity.

The Tuwaiq Palace contains 24,000 square meters of recreational, social, dining, banqueting, conference and accommodation functions. Such diverse functions as a tenpin bowling alley, crèche, billiards, library, secretariats and hotel rooms are combined with the usual club facilities of swimming, tennis, squash, sauna, exercise, lounges, social rooms and formal and informal dining. All technical, mechanical and staff-related functions to support such a facility are included within the palace.

Architectural historian and critic Chris Abel, a visiting professor at Ulster University Belfast, described Tuwaiq Palace as "a hybrid of mixed materials and techniques... creating a powerful fusion of traditional forms and modern technologies, carefully set into the desert landscape on the edge of the city."

== Recognition ==
Tuwaiq Palace received the Aga Khan Award for Architecture in the 1996-1998 award cycle. The award citation highlighted the palace's response to its desert setting and its combination of traditional forms with modern construction techniques. The building was also discussed in The New York Times in relation to contemporary Islamic architectural design.
