= Al-Hajjaria =

Al-Hajjaria Trust (Waqf or "property dedications")(Arabic: وقف الحجارية) refers to real estate in the suburb of Madinah. It was dedicated as a trust (waqf), which was incorporated in 1513, before becoming a landmark and used as legal reference for other properties in many court documents. These court documents are more than mere legal records; they also serve as historical preservation of the social and political circumstance of that period. Likewise, the record and history of the AlHajjaria Trust (Waqf) serves as a historical preservation as well.

== Description ==
Al-Hajjaria Trust was composed of the "Big House" on Souk Road and the well-known Al-Hajjaria Agricultural farm on Tahhan Road situated on the way out to Quba Mosque.

== History ==
Al-Hajjaria Trust was the most well-known trust in Madinah for over 500 years. It was dedicated by Sheikh Abu Baker bin Abdullah Al Hajjar. Al-Hajjaria was a prominent landmark and is mentioned in many Ottoman court documents as the points of reference for neighboring properties, as shown on this recorded deed from 977 Hijri (corresponding to 1569 Gregorian year). These documents are of historical significance as the Ottoman Empire ruled this area during that period and their court documents are the best preserved historical references of that era.

== Current status ==
The Al-Hajjaria Trust has since been sold, the areas developed, and the trust funds transferred to other property investments in Madinah, still held by the Al-Hajjar family descendants.
