= The Avenues (Riyadh) =

Mall and mixed-use complex in Riyadh

The Avenues – Riyadh
- الأڤنيوز – الرياض
- Location: Riyadh, Saudi Arabia
- Coordinates: 24.82168°N 46.61084°E
- Address: King Salman Road and King Fahd Road intersection, Northern Riyadh
- Opened: Q1 2027 (scheduled)
- Developer: Shomoul Holding
- Owner: Shomoul Holding
- Architect: Pace
- Floor area: 390,000 m^{2} (4,200,000 sq ft) (site area); 1,870,000 m^{2} (20,100,000 sq ft) (built-up area)
- Floors: 3
- Parking: 14,000+

The Avenues – Riyadh (Arabic: الأڤنيوز – الرياض) is a mixed-use development and shopping mall under construction in northern Riyadh, Saudi Arabia. Developed by Shomoul Holding, It is one of two Avenues developments in the country, the other being The Avenues – Khobar. The complex spans a 390,000-square-metre site with a total built-up area of 1,870,000 square metres and includes five towers. It is scheduled to open in March 2027 and is expected to be one of the largest shopping centres in the world.

== History ==
Plans for The Avenues – Riyadh were first introduced in the mid-2010s by Shomoul Holding, a joint venture led by Kuwait-based Mabanee alongside Saudi Arabia's Al-Fozan Group and Alshaya Group. The project was conceived to expand Mabanee's retail brand into Saudi Arabia following the flagship Avenues mall in Kuwait.

In November 2021, Shomoul Holding awarded a SAR 6.4 billion main construction contract to Nesma & Partners to build the first phase of the development. The official groundbreaking ceremony took place in February 2022 under the patronage of Riyadh Governor Faisal bin Bandar.

Construction progressed in two main stages across a 390,000-square-meter site in northern Riyadh. Overall project completion reached 44.5% by August 2024 and 65% by January 2025, by which point retail leasing had already surpassed 70%. By September 2026, overall construction stood at approximately 89% as retailers began interior fit-outs, ahead of a scheduled full opening of the mall and its five surrounding hospitality, residential, and office towers in March 2027.

== Design and layout ==
The master plan combines a three-storey retail centre with five high-rise towers. Three of the towers are planned as hotels operated under Hilton Worldwide brands: Waldorf Astoria, Canopy by Hilton, and Conrad Hotels.

The retail complex is divided into nine commercial districts:

- Grand Avenue
- Prestige
- Grand Plaza
- The Forum
- Electra
- The Souk
- The Mall
- The Walk
- The Oasis

== See also ==
- List of shopping malls in Saudi Arabia
- List of tallest buildings in Saudi Arabia
