= KAFD Grand Mosque =

Mosque in Riyadh, Saudi Arabia

- Location of the mosque in Saudi Arabia

Religion
- Affiliation: Islam
- Ecclesiastical or organizational status: Friday mosque
- Status: Active

Location
- Location: Riyadh, King Abdullah Financial District
- Country: Saudi Arabia
- Interactive map of KAFD Grand Mosque
- Coordinates: 24°45′41.1″N 46°38′21.2″E

Architecture
- Architect: Omrania and Associates
- Type: Islamic architecture
- Style: Modern
- Completed: 2017

Specifications
- Capacity: 1,500 worshippers
- Interior area: 6,103 m^{2} (65,690 sq ft)
- Minaret: Two
- Minaret height: 60 m (200 ft)
- Site area: 10,760 m^{2} (115,800 sq ft)
- Materials: Stone caldding

The KAFD Grand Mosque (Note: Arabic: جامع مركز الملك عبد الله المالي (romanized: Jāmiʿ Markaz al-Malik ʿAbd Allāh al-Mālī)) is a Friday mosque in the al-Aqeeq neighborhood of Riyadh, Saudi Arabia, located within the King Abdullah Financial District. Built in 2017, the 6,103-square-metre (65,690 sq ft) structure sits on a large urban plaza that functions as a public space and, when needed, outdoor prayer area. Inside, the column-free space can accommodate 1,500 prayer spaces over two levels — a large central hall and a mezzanine. Designed by the Riyadh-based architecture and engineering firm Omrania and Associates, the mosque is inspired by the form of the desert rose.

== Design ==
The general concept of the KAFD Grand Mosque is inspired by the desert rose, a naturally occurring crystalline structure commonly found in the deserts of Saudi Arabia. The specific geometries of the building, however, are based on traditional Islamic patterns and provide integrated sun shading as well as a sculptural articulation that is consistent with the design principles of the KAFD master plan developed by Henning Larsen.The stone cladding and minimal glazing also protect the building from the environment while reinforcing the idea of the desert landscape.

Design firm Omrania stated in Middle East Architect magazine, "A major challenge was to develop the geometry in such a way as to support a column free internal environment. All of the loads are transferred through the structural skin, and the skin supports a flying mezzanine by means of hanging supports." In 2019 Omrania's KAFD Grand Mosque was named the mosque one of the "Top 10 contemporary mosques that challenge traditional Islamic architecture."

=== Site ===
The site is located at the intersection of three large sunken pathways or urban “wadi” (valleys) surrounded by the skyscrapers. A new public plaza and outdoor prayer space elevates the mosque above the wadi but below the entrance to the skyscrapers. Two 60-metre-tall (200 ft) minarets mark the entrance to the mosque plaza. Because the building is highly visible from all directions and from above, the tessellated roof was designed as a “fifth elevation.”

=== Interiors and symbolism ===
The interior is a single large, column-free space. The western side features a colored glass mihrab, whose triangular glazing represents abstracted muqarnas. Triangulated ceiling panels, also inspired by muqarnas, provide additional lighting and improve acoustics. At ground level, small windows are design with multiple layers of abstracted Arabic calligraphy of verses from the Quran.

=== Structure and MEP ===
To create the column-free prayer space, the mosque is designed with a 2.8-metre-deep (9.2 ft) structural skin, which also supports a hanging mezzanine. The mechanical and structural systems are concealed beneath the mosque plaza or integrated into the mosque's enclosure.

== Awards ==
- 2017 Finalist, religion - World Architecture Festival
- 2019 Winner of Abdullatif Al Fozan Award for Mosque Architecture

== See also ==
- Islam in Saudi Arabia
- List of mosques in Saudi Arabia
