= Omrania and Associates =

Saudi architects and urban planners

Omrania
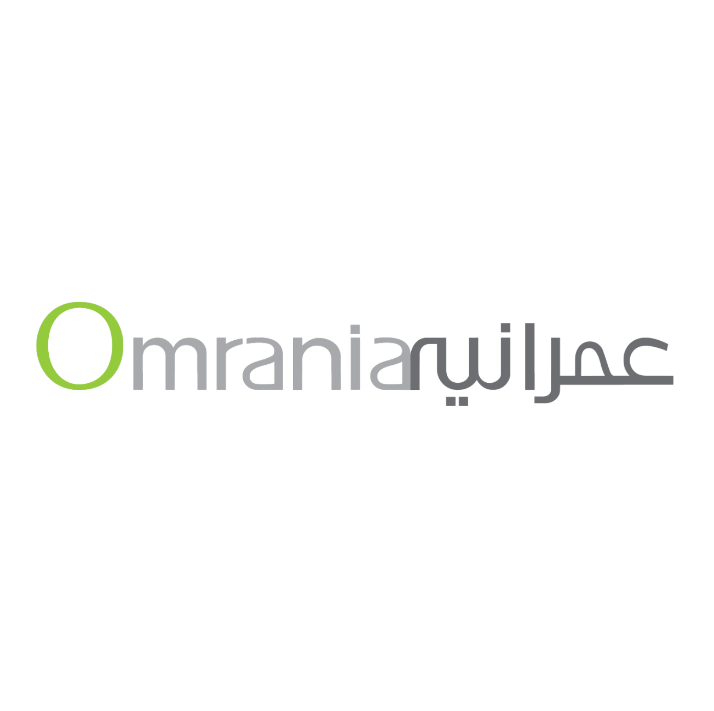
- Type: Private company
- Industry: Architecture; urban planning; engineering
- Founded: 1973; 53 years ago
- Founder: Basem Al-Shihabi; Nabil Fanous
- Headquarters: Riyadh, Saudi Arabia
- Key people: Basem Al Shihabi (managing director)
- Services: Architectural design; Urban design; Master planning; Structural engineering; Building systems; Landscape; Interiors
- Owner: Egis (2023–present)
- Number of employees: 500+
- Website: www.omrania.com

Omrania and Associates (Arabic: عمرانية وشركاه), also known as Omrania, is an international architectural, engineering, and urban planning firm based in Riyadh, Saudi Arabia. Founded in 1973, it specializes in the design of contextual and high-performance design projects.

The firm has designed a diverse range of buildings and infrastructure projects in Saudi Arabia, as well as in the Middle East, Europe, and North Africa. Omrania's best-known projects include the Kingdom Centre (Kingdom Tower), the Public Investment Fund (PIF) (formerly Capital Market Authority Headquarters) Tower, and the Aga Khan Award-winning Tuwaiq Palace in Riyadh's Diplomatic Quarter. The firm's most recent high-profile project in development is the King Salman Park in Riyadh, which will become the largest city park in the world.

With approximately 500 employees, Omrania has two offices in Riyadh and additional offices in Jeddah and Amman, Jordan. The four office teams include professionals from more than 30 countries. The company is led by a board of directors representing all design disciplines and administration units.

On November 14, 2023, Egis announced that it had completed the purchase of Omrania.

== History and growth ==
Omrania was founded when architects Basem Al-Shihabi and Nabil Fanous collaborated to win an international design competition for the General Organization for Social Insurance (GOSI) Headquarters in Riyadh. In order to design and supervise the building's construction, they opened a small office that eventually grew into a large, multi-disciplinary practice of Omrania. Since then, Omrania has become a major contributor to Riyadh’s urban expansion, as the capital city grew from 150,000 people in 1960 to 7.6 million by 2017.

In 1980, Omrania established a branch office in London, designing international projects such as the Tuwaiq Palace, the Radwa 4 planned community in Yanbu, Saudi Arabia, and the interior renovation of historic Four Millbank in the City of Westminster, London.

In addition to designing numerous corporate headquarters, one of the firm's key early projects was the Tuwaiq Palace, a diplomatic club in Riyadh completed in 1985. In collaboration with Buro Happold and Frei Otto, Omrania's design drew from vernacular architectural forms such as the tent and fortification, adapted to the desert climate.

Omrania continued to expand its portfolio of mixed-use projects throughout the 1990s. In 1999, in conjunction with Ellerbe Becket, Omrania designed and supervised the construction of Riyadh's Kingdom Centre; a shopping center, hotel, office, and residential complex with a 300-meter (984-feet) tower and skybridge overlooking Riyadh.

In the 21st century, the firm has increased its portfolio of urban planning and public space designs. Omrania designed (with Aukett Fitzroy Robinson) Riyadh's Salam Park (2003), a 25-hectare public park that offers an oasis of urban green space. Omrania also completed a comprehensive Olayya-Batha Corridor planning and transportation study with Perkins + Will and Dornier Consulting.

While most of Omrania's completed works are within the Kingdom of Saudi Arabia, the company opened branch offices in Bahrain and Jordan and, from this expanded base of operations, has completed projects in Tunisia, Yemen, Lebanon, Qatar, the United Arab Emirates, Jordan, and Bahrain. The firm also was an equity holder from 1992 to 2004 in Chovet Engineering, a French manufacturing and process engineering company.

In 2013, Omrania was selected—along with architects Zaha Hadid Architects, Snøhetta, and Gerber Architekten—to design one of the four main intermodal transit hubs of the new Arriyadh Metro (Riyadh Metro) system. Omrania's Arriyadh Metro Western Station, when completed in 2020, will incorporate public gardens and community space as well as a fully enclosed intermodal transit hub serving the new Metro and express bus network. In 2018, Omrania's newly completed Grand Mosque in King Abdullah Financial District (KAFD) in Riyadh gained international recognition for its angular geometric forms and delicate treatment of light. The mosque's distinctive design reflects its modern context, the arid environment of Saudi Arabia, and the traditions of Islam. In 2019, the firm was master planning 25 new residential communities covering 45 square km (17.3 square mi.) in Saudi Arabia's western region on behalf of the nation's Ministry of Housing, all with pedestrian-friendly streetscapes and sustainable infrastructure.

The firm's largest skyscraper is the 385-meter (1,263-foot) Public Investment Fund (PIF) Tower (formerly known as CMA Tower) designed by Omrania and HOK in a joint venture. The tower is the tallest building in Riyadh and the anchor of the city's King Abdullah Financial District (KAFD). Its hexagonal-shaped plan tapers inward and outward as it rises, providing open floor plans and a distinctively crystalline profile on the skyline, "inspired from geologic formations polished by the hand of man," according to the architects. Additional Omrania projects completed in 2019 include the Riyadh Hilton Hotel & Residences and the Radission Blu Hotel & Residences in Riyadh's Diplomatic Quarter. The 2019 announcement of Omrania's role in designing the future King Salman Park, said to be the world's largest city park, placed the firm once again in the international spotlight.

Omrania has teamed with the Center for the Study of the Built Environment since 2008 to sponsor of the Omrania | CSBE Student Award for Architectural Design, which recognizes outstanding design projects by graduating students in architecture across the Middle East.

== Omrania and sustainable design ==
The new headquarters campus of the Saudi Electricity Company (SEC) — one of the firm's current large-scale projects — includes vast rooftop solar arrays, computer-modeled shading systems and other passive design measures to reduce energy consumption. This "green building" project has also been described in the architectural media as a healthy building, "designed with the ultimate comfort of its employees in mind.”

Other examples of Omrania's sustainable design include high-performance façade systems on the PIF Tower, Waha Office Building, and the Radisson Blu Diplomatic Quarter, all in Riyadh. The PIF Tower, designed with HOK to achieve LEED_NC Gold certification, has an external layer of fins, gantries, and perforated panels that provide enhanced shade, minimize internal cooling loads, and reduce energy costs. A photovoltaic array further boosts energy performance. The King Abdullah Financial District (KAFD) in Riyadh, the site of Omrania's PIF Tower and Grand Mosque, was the largest green development in the world seeking green building accreditationin 2011 and is set to become the world's first LEED-certified district.

== Major projects ==
=== Cultural and diplomatic ===
- Grand Mosque, King Abdullah Financial District, Riyadh (2017).
- Royal Embassy of the Kingdom of Saudi Arabia, Amman, Jordan (2014).
- Tuwaiq Palace, Diplomatic Quarter, Riyadh (1985).

=== Major office building ===
- PIF Headquarters Tower (formerly CMA Tower), KAFD, Riyadh (2018).
- GOSI Office Park (2013).
- Kingdom Centre, Riyadh (2001).
- NCCI Headquarters, Riyadh (1998).
- Gulf Cooperation Council Headquarters, Riyadh (1987).
- Four Millbank, London, UK (1988).

=== Transportation ===
- Western Hub Station, Arriyadh Metro, Riyadh (2020)
- Streetscape redesign, Prince Mohammed Bin Abdulaziz Street (2004)

=== Hospitality and leisure ===
- KAAR Gateway Development (2022).
- Hilton Riyadh Hotel and Residences (2019).
- Radisson Blu Hotel and Residences, Diplomatic Quarter, Riyadh (2019).

=== Healthcare ===
- Kingdom Hospital, Riyadh (2001).

=== Master planning ===
- SUKNA Living Community, Asfahan, Jeddah, KSA (2020)
- Ministry of Housing New Town Program, KSA (ongoing)
- KA-CARE, Southwest Riyadh, KSA (2010).
- Radwa 4 Community Development, Yanbu, KSA (1984)

=== Public spaces (landscape architecture) ===
- King Salman Park, Riyadh (2024).
- Prince Mohammed Bin Abdulaziz Street Revitalisation, Riyadh (2004).
- Salam Park, Riyadh (2003).
- Diplomatic Quarter Internal Landscaping, Riyadh (1986).

=== Interiors ===
- Four Seasons Hotel, Riyadh (2001).
- Kingdom Centre Mall, Riyadh. (2001).
- SAMBA Offices, Riyadh. (2002).

=== Services ===
- Architectural design
- Urban design
- Master planning
- Landscape architecture
- Interior design
- Structural and building services engineering (mechanical, electrical, plumbing and fire protection)
- Civil engineering and utilities infrastructure
- Transportation engineering
- Value engineering
- Quantity surveying
- Construction tendering
- Construction contract administration and site supervision

== Board of directors ==
- Basem Al-Shihabi: managing director
- Othman Al-Washmi: director — Saudi Arabia
- Abdulsalam Al-Haddad: marketing and business development director
- Majdi El-Shami: technical director
- Zouheir Kodeih: head of construction supervision
- Mahmoud Abughazal: head of architecture and interior design departments
- Mutasem Diab: director — Jordan
- Rukn Eldeen Mohammed: senior project manager
- Maher Shkoukani: senior project manager
- Hisham Al-Weher: corporate financial manager
