= Red Sea Mall =

- ردسي مول
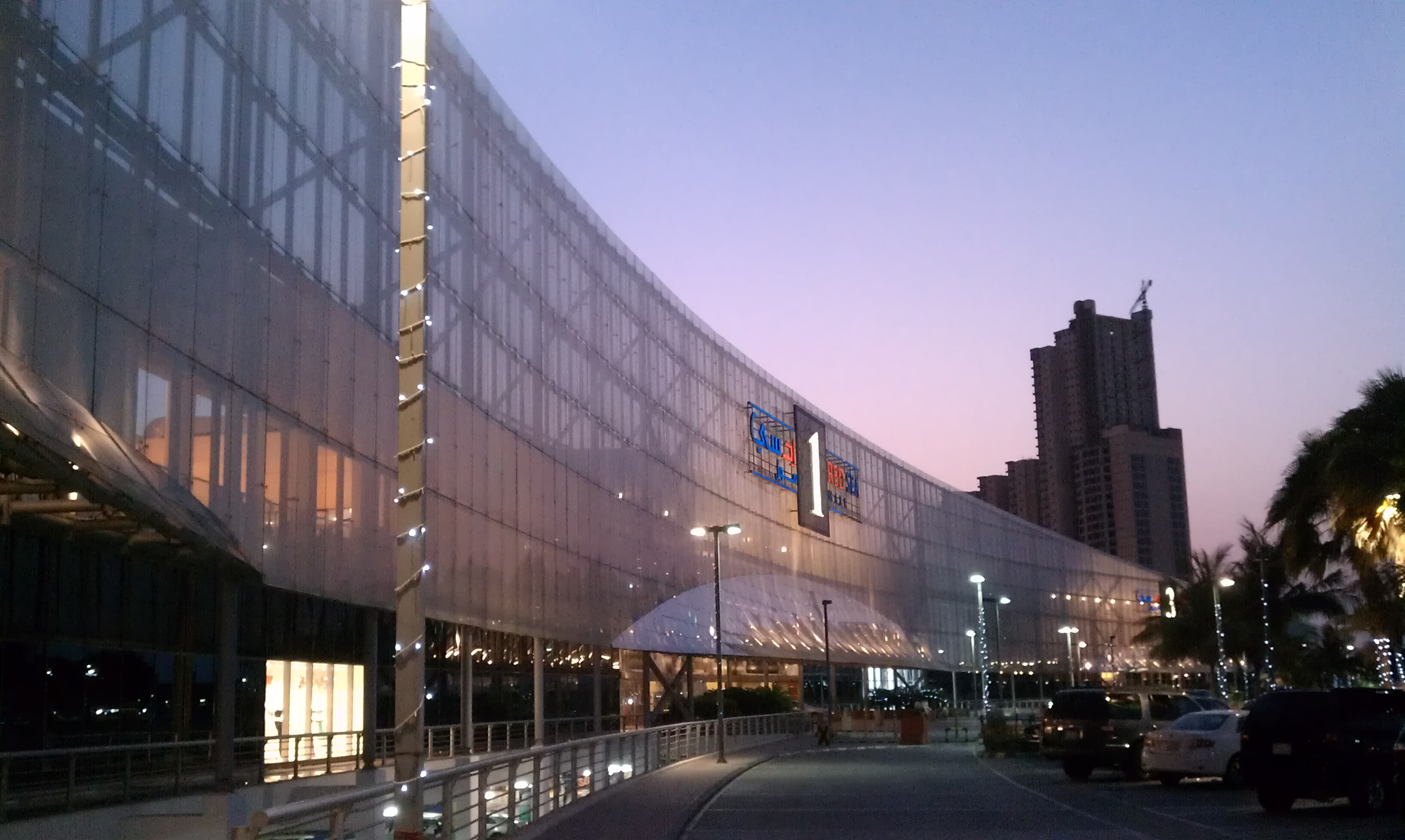
- Main entrance in 2013
- Location: Jeddah, Saudi Arabia
- Coordinates: 21°37′40″N 39°06′40″E
- Opened: March, 2008
- Developer: SEDCO Holding
- Num. of anchor tenants: 4
- Floor area: 242,000 m^{2} (2,600,000 sq ft)
- Floors: 3
- Parking: Underground, parking Lot and parking garage
- Website: redseamall.com

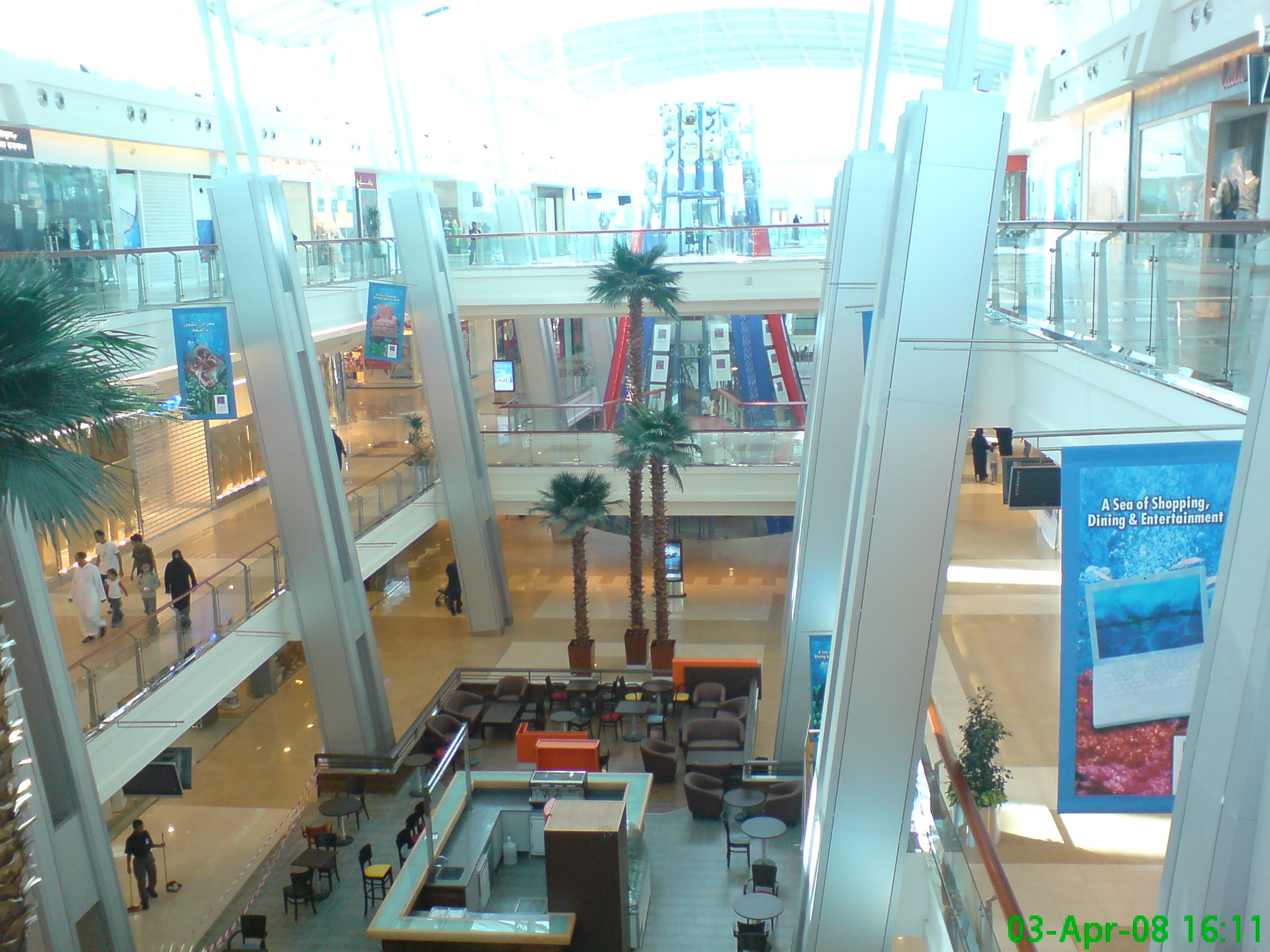
Inside view

The Red Sea Mall is a shopping mall located in the northern suburb of Jeddah in the Kingdom of Saudi Arabia. The mall is located on the western side of the King Abdulaziz Road (طريق الملك عبدالعزيز) between the King Abdulaziz International Airport and the Red Sea coast. It covers approximately 242,200 square meters of built area. There is a hotel attached to it called "Elaf Jeddah". The mall's main facilities are a Danube supermarket, Sparky's Games City, and Jeddah's first cinema; the VOX cinema. The cinema has 12 halls: six standard, three gold, one Imax, one kid, and one VIP. Upon opening, it had both the biggest indoor water fountain and the largest glass covered area in Saudi Arabia. Some restaurants inside the mall include Applebee's, P.F. Chang, Texas Roadhouse, Five Guys, Shake Shack, McDonald's, Burger King, KFC, Al Baik, and Nando's.

== Layout and design ==
The basic design is a curved building (120°) with the main entrance in the center of the inner curve leading to a set of central courts.

== Awards ==
In 2018, Red Sea Mall has won several awards in the GCC, Africa, and Middle East Business Excellence Awards. Some of the awards won are: Red Sea Mall Cup, ICSC Foundation Award, The Best Shopping Center of the Year for the ITAAM project that was aimed at reducing the waste of food and utilization of the leftover, non-used food by distributing it to the needy, the productive families campaign, and much more.

== See also ==
- List of shopping malls in Saudi Arabia
