= Al Deira Market =

Al Diera Market
- أسواق الديرة
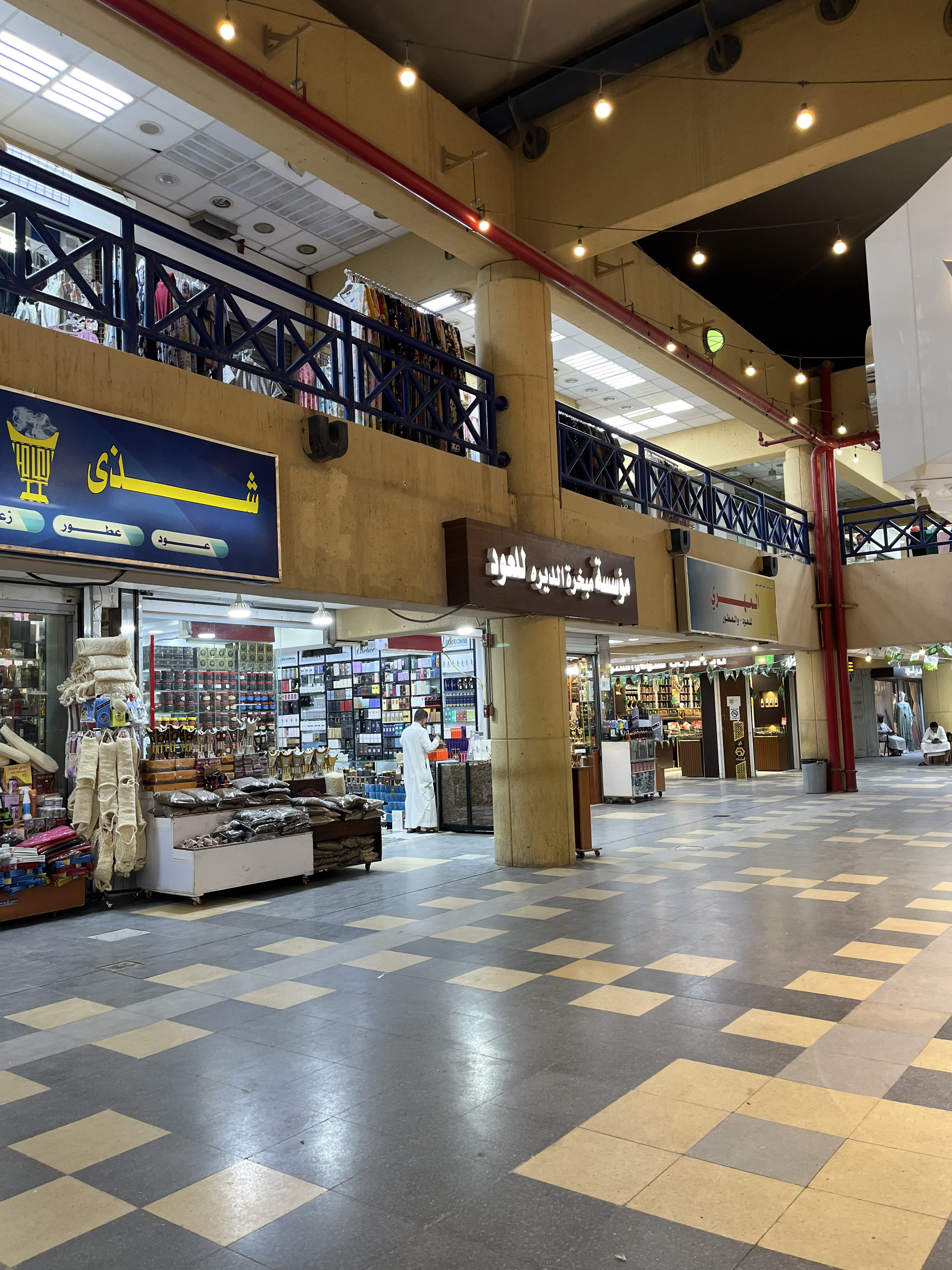
- Souq Ushaiger, 2024
- Location: Riyadh, Saudi Arabia
- Coordinates: 24.62808°N 46.70973°E
- Previous names: Qasiriya Ibn Qulaib; Souq al-Mughaibrah
- Developer: Riyadh Holding Company
- Stores and services: 400

Al Deira Market (Arabic: أسواق الديرة), also known as Souq Ushaiger (Arabic: سوق أشيقر) is a traditional shopping center in the ad-Dirah district of Riyadh, Saudi Arabia, located in the Qasr al-Hukm District. It contains 400 shops that specialize in the sale of handicrafts, imported fabrics and carpets. It emerged from the ruins of Qasiriya Ibn Qulaib (Arabic: قيصرية ابن كليب) and Souq al-Mughaibrah (Arabic: سوق المقيبرة) is alternately named after the town of Ushaiger, where most of the shopkeepers once came from. The market's origins can be traced back 19th century during the era of Second Saudi State and was rebuilt by the Riyadh Holding Company in its current form during the second phase of the Qasr Al Hukm District Development Project between 1988 and 1992.

== History and background ==
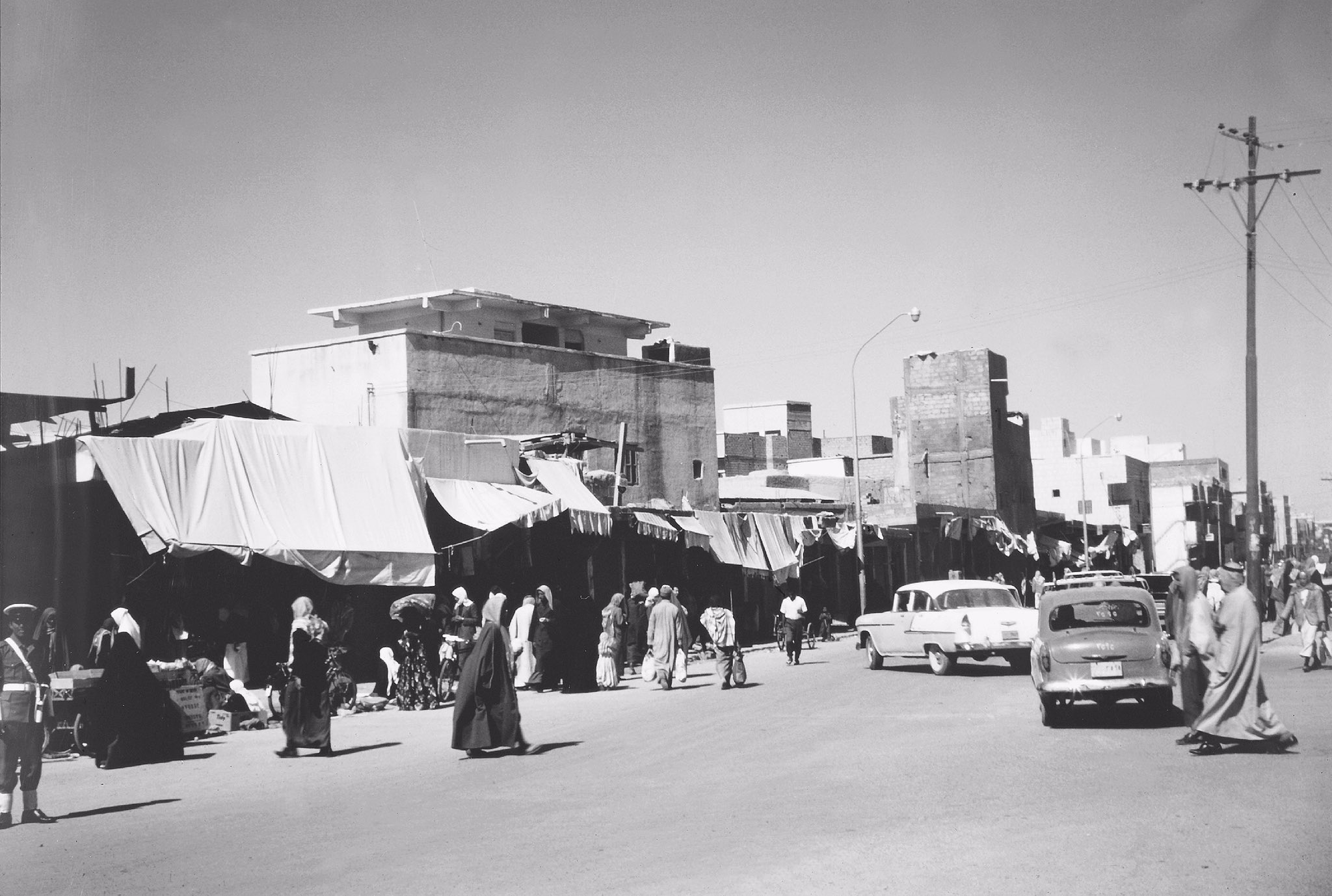
Souq Ushaiger, 1965

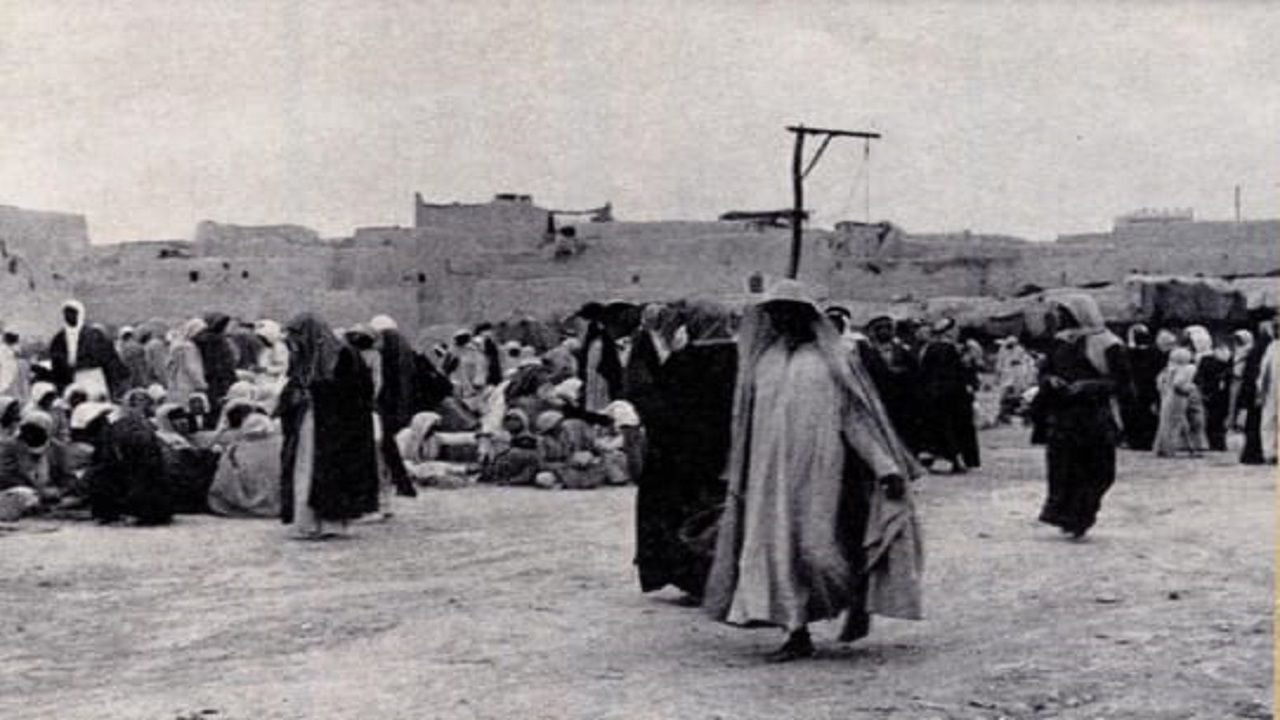
Souq al-Mughaibrah, 1943

The origins of the market can be traced back to the 19th century during the era of the Second Saudi State. It was later rehabilitated by a trader named Ibn Kulaib in late 1948 or early 1949 during the reign of King Abdulaziz ibn Saud, after he purchased and demolished the residence of Prince Saud bin Sa'ad, the son of Prince Sa'ad bin Abdul Rahman Al Saud and was known as Qasiriya ibn Qulaib.

Following the dismantling of the city walls in the 1950s, the Ghanaiy quarter as well as the Mughaibrah quarter, just like other quarters of the former walled town, were incorporated into the current metropolis of Riyadh. The market was later known as Souq Ushaiger as most of its vendors and shopkeepers came from the town of Ushaiger.

In 1963, the Souq al-Mughaibrah was expanded and included Souq al-Hasawiyah (Arabic: سوق الحساوية).

In March 1973, King Faisal bin Abdulaziz issued directives to Sheikh Abdulaziz Thunayyan, then mayor of Riyadh to conduct an extensive study of the area surrounding the al-Hukm Palace and implementing the project of its renovation the following year. In 1976, the High Commission for the Development of Arriyadh commissioned the Qasr Al Hukm District Development Project and agreed on developmental programs that were prepared to transform the Qasr al-Hukm District into a cultural center. The designs were completed by 1979 and the construction lasted between 1983 and 1992 in broadly two phases, costing around US$500 million. The project was overseen by Prince Salman bin Abdulaziz, the-then governor of Riyadh.

In 1985, the Maigliah Markets Company Limited was established as a real state firm, which got later renamed as Riyadh Holding Company. The company was responsible with renovation of the market alongside the Al Maigliah Market Center. The market was rebuilt during the second phase of the Qasr Al Hukm District Development Project.
