= Souq al-Thumairi =

Marketplace in Riyadh, Saudi Arabia

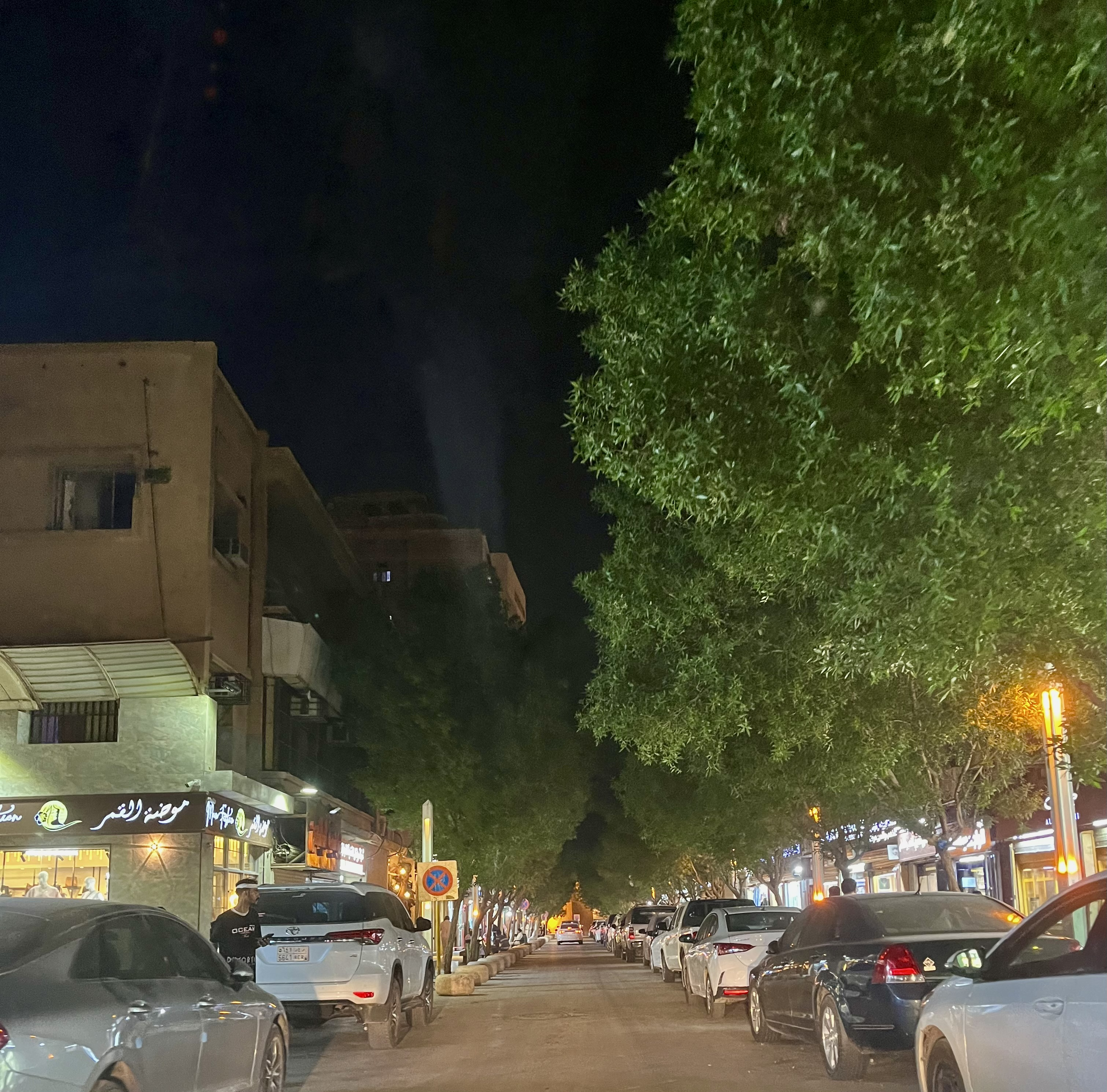
Thumairi Street, 2024

Souq al-Thumairi (Arabic: سوق الثميري), also known as the Clocktower Souq, is a historic traditional marketplace in the ad-Dirah neighborhood of Riyadh, Saudi Arabia, located on the either side of the Thumairi Street in the Qasr al-Hukm District. It is known for its gold markets and jewelry stores, besides several heritage shops that specialize in the sale of antique firearms and other souvenir items. It stretches from the Thumairi Gate, which it is named after, and culminates at the Safat Clocktower. The avenue was rebuilt in the 1990s in the modern Najdi architectural style as part of the Qasr Al Hukm District Development Project.

== History and background ==
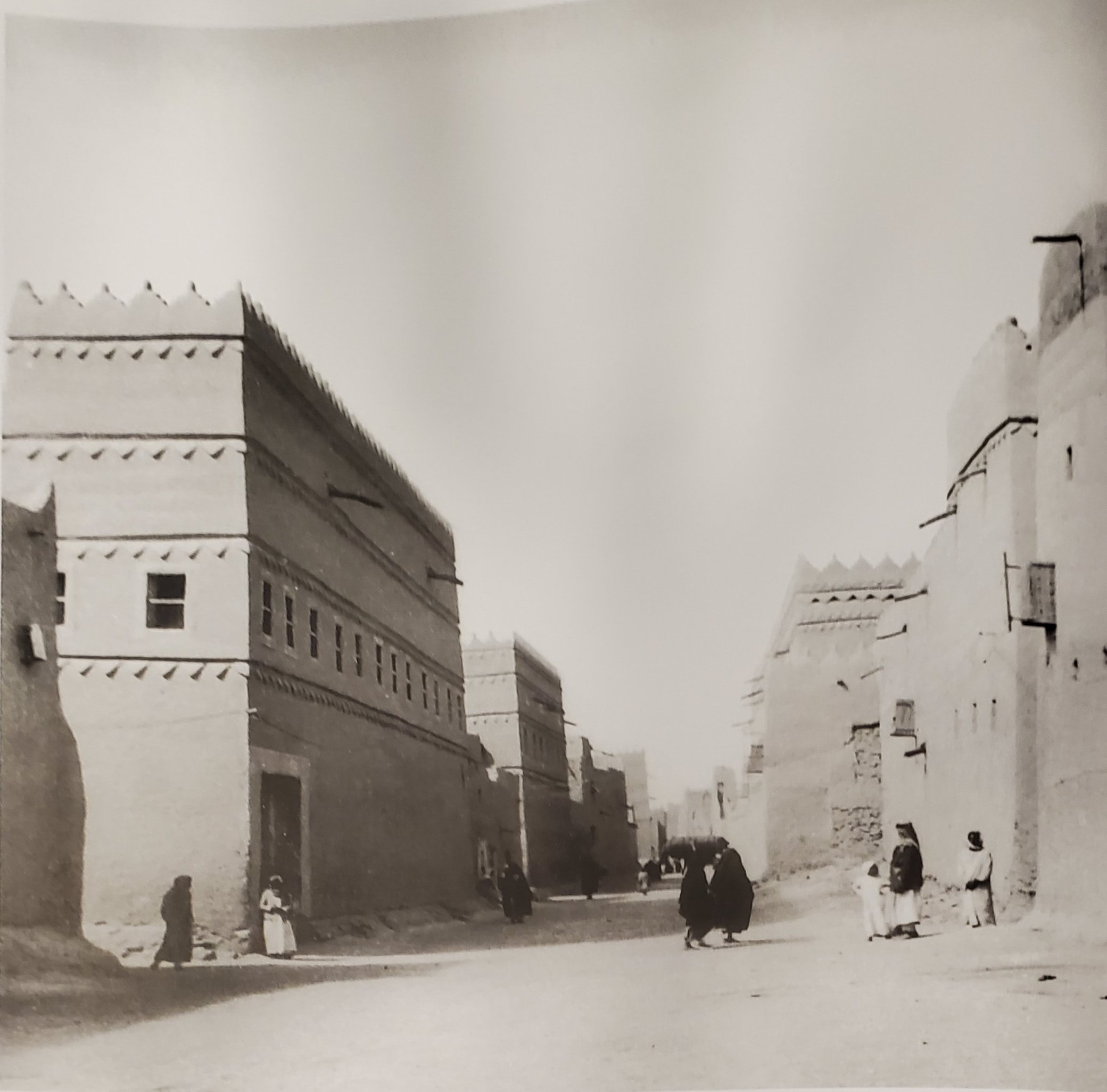
Thumairi Street, 1938

Thumairi Street is considered to be one of the oldest streets of Riyadh, and served as the eastern entrance to the walled town beyond Thumairi Gate while separating Ajnab and Gadimah quarters. In 1923, the street was paved and leveled during the reign of King Abdulaziz ibn Saud, when he was the leader of the Sultanate of Nejd. The street was named King Abdulaziz Street until the 1960s, when it was renamed after the Thumairi Gate during the reign of King Faisal bin Abdulaziz. The street was later paved with asphalt in the 1940s and was used by King Abdulaziz to travel between the Murabba Palace and al-Hukm Palace. The street also hosted the residences of Princess Noura bint Abdul Rahman and Prince Turki I bin Abdulaziz.

Following the demolition of Riyadh's city walls, death of King Abdulaziz ibn Saud and along with the rapid expansion and modernization of the city between 1950s and 1960s, the al-Hukm Palace and its surrounding areas had slowly begun to decline in importance. Many neighborhoods such as Duhairah was abandoned by its residents in pursuit of better opportunities in north of the capital. During the reign of King Faisal bin Abdulaziz, Saudi authorities began focusing on the resuscitation and rejuvenation of the area and the preservation of its historical and architectural significance.

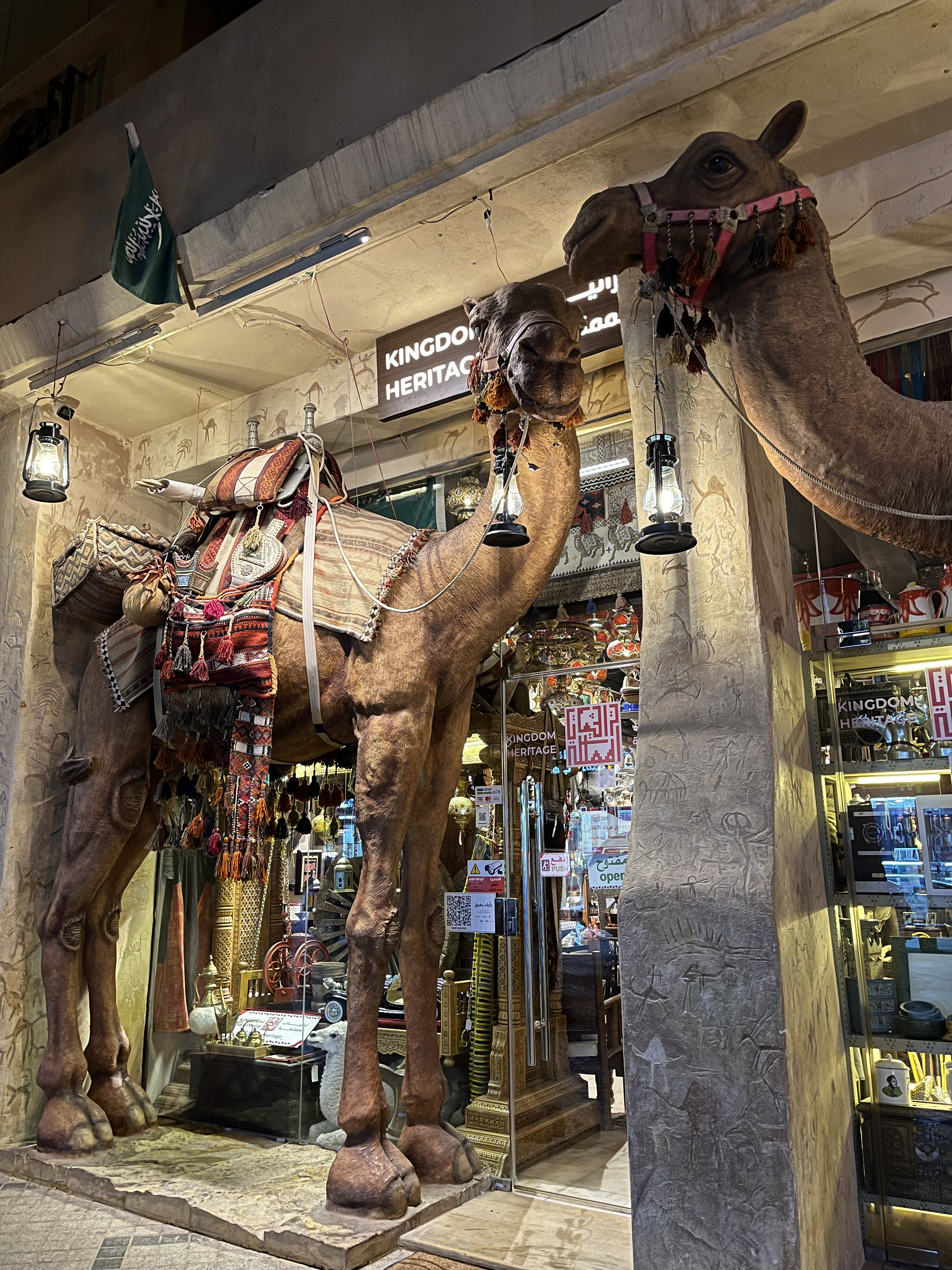
Life size figurine of camels at the entrance of Kingdom Heritage souvenir shop

In March 1973, King Faisal bin Abdulaziz issued directives to Sheikh Abdulaziz Thunayyan, then mayor of Riyadh to conduct an extensive study of the area surrounding the al-Hukm Palace and implementing the project of its renovation the following year. In 1976, the High Commission for the Development of Arriyadh commissioned the Qasr Al Hukm District Development Project and agreed on developmental programs that were prepared to transform the Qasr al-Hukm District into a cultural center. The designs were completed by 1979 and the construction lasted between 1983 and 1992 in broadly two phases, costing around US$500 million. The project was overseen by Prince Salman bin Abdulaziz, the-then governor of Riyadh.

The avenue was rebuilt by the Royal Commission for Riyadh City in the 1990s in the modern Najdi architectural style. The market is popular for its gold shops and jewelry stores as well as for the sale of antique firearms. The market also gets frequented by customers during festive seasons like Eid al-Fitr and Eid al-Adha who usually purchase ready-made clothing.
