= Qasr Al-Hukm District =

Site of the former walled town of Riyadh, Saudi Arabia

Qasr Al-Hukm District منطقة قصر الحكم
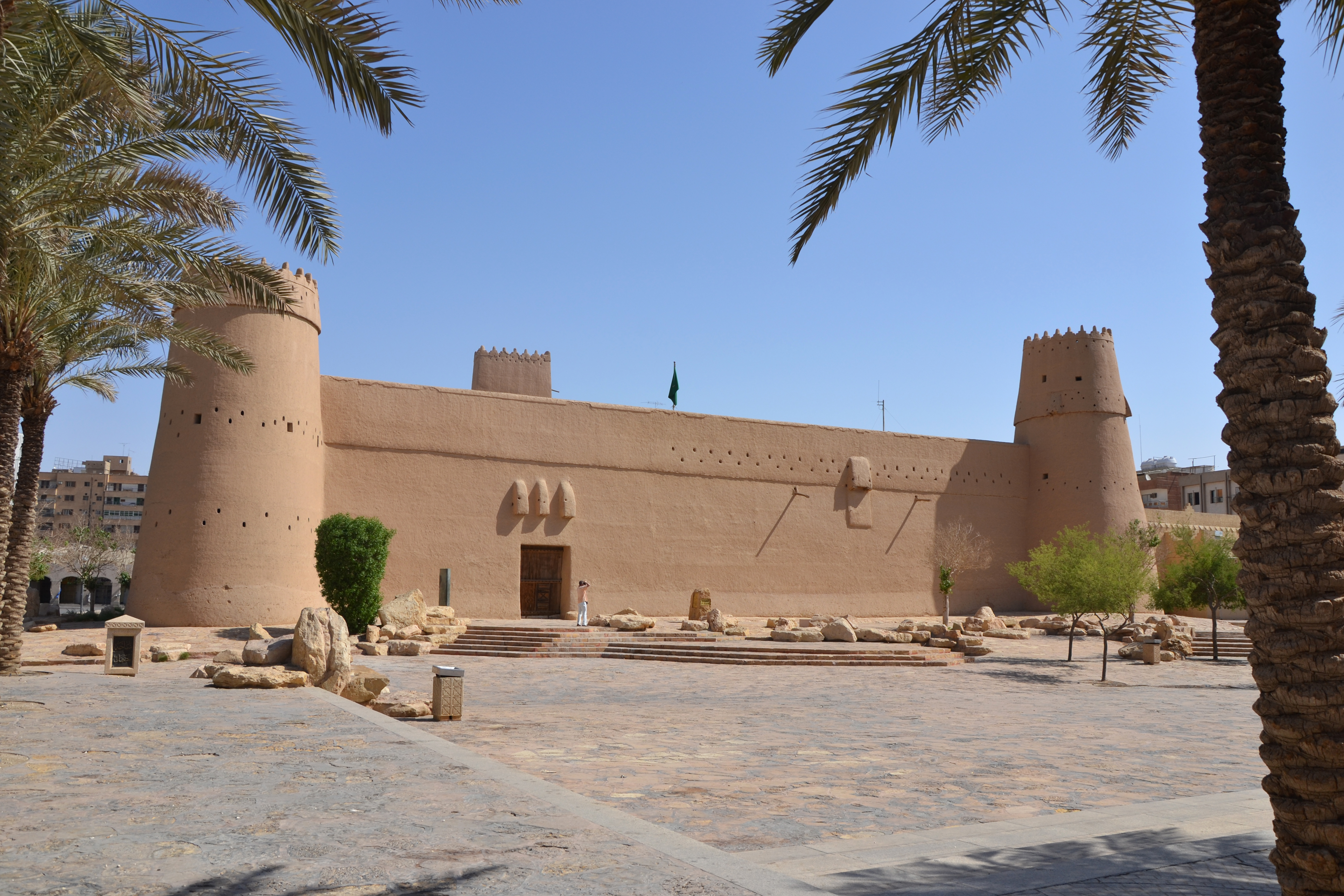
- Masmak Fortress, 2011
- Interactive map of Qasr Al-Hukm District
- Coordinates: 24°37′50.6″N 46°42′38.9″E
- Country: Saudi Arabia
- City: Riyadh
- Sub-municipality: Al Batʼha
- Region: Old Riyadh
- Qasr Al Hukm District Development Project: 1973
- Commissioned: 1976
- Phase 1: 1983–1988
- Phase 2: 1988–1992
- Founder: Faisal bin Abdulaziz
- Named for: Al Hukm Palace

Qasr al-Hukm District (Arabic: منطقة قصر الحكم, romanized: Minṭaqaẗ Qaṣr al-Ḥukm, lit. 'Governance Palace District') or the Justice Palace District (Arabic: منطقة قصر العدل, romanized: Minṭaqaẗ Qaṣr al-ʿAdl, lit. 'Justice Palace District'), is a term used to define the area within the perimeters of the erstwhile walled town of Riyadh in Riyadh, Saudi Arabia, encompassing present-day districts of ad-Dirah and ad-Doho, that lie on several extinct douars (Arabic: حِلَّة, romanized: ḥilla) that once fell within the enclosure of the gates of old city walls prior to its demolition in the 1950s. Named after the eponymous al-Hukm Palace, it is widely considered to be the antecedent to modern Riyadh since the metropolis outgrew as an offshoot of the walled town in the 1950s. Owing to its historical and architectural significance, it was rebuilt by the Saudi government from 1973 to 1992 and is situated southwest of al-Batʼha commercial area.

It hosts some of the most important cultural heritage landmarks in the city, such as Masmak Fortress, Imam Turki bin Abdullah Grand Mosque, Deera Square and the eponymous al-Hukm Palace besides several traditional marketplaces.

== History and background ==
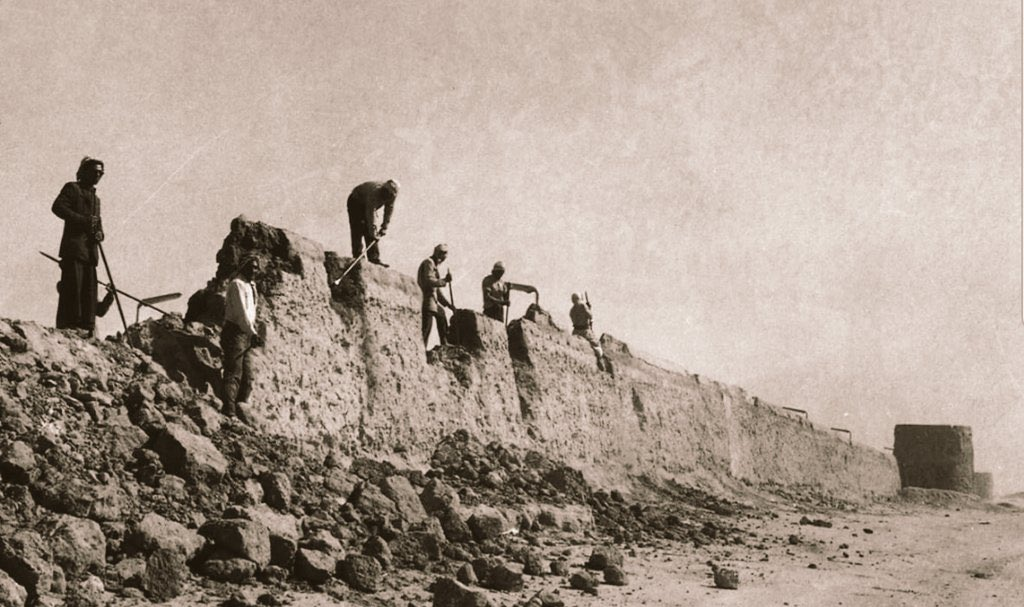
The demolition of the city walls in the 1950s was a prelude to the expansion and modernization of Riyadh

Following the demolition of Riyadh's city walls, death of King Abdulaziz ibn Saud and along with the rapid expansion and modernization of the city between 1950s and 1960s, the al-Hukm Palace and its surrounding areas had slowly begun to decline in importance. Many neighborhoods such as Duhairah was abandoned by its residents in pursuit of better opportunities in north of the capital. During the reign of King Faisal bin Abdulaziz, Saudi authorities began focusing on the resuscitation and rejuvenation of the area and the preservation of its historical and architectural significance.

In March 1973, King Faisal bin Abdulaziz issued directives to Sheikh Abdulaziz Thunayyan, then mayor of Riyadh to conduct an extensive study of the area surrounding the al-Hukm Palace and implementing the project of its renovation the following year. In 1976, the High Commission for the Development of Arriyadh commissioned the Qasr Al Hukm District Development Project and agreed on developmental programs that were prepared to transform the Qasr al-Hukm District into a cultural center. The designs were completed by 1979 and the construction lasted between 1983 and 1992 in broadly two phases, costing around US$500 million. The project was overseen by Prince Salman bin Abdulaziz, the-then governor of Riyadh.

The project was completed in 1982, and was divided into three phases,

=== Phase 1 (1983–1988) ===
The first phase lasted between 1983 and 1988, in which the main offices of the Riyadh's governor, mayor and the regular police were constructed in the palace.

=== Phase 2 (1988–1992) ===
The second phase lasted between 1988 and 1992, where the Imam Turki bin Abdullah Mosque, Qasr Al-Hukm, Al-Adl Plaza, Assafah Plaza, Imam Muhammad bin Saud Plaza, Al-Musmak Plaza, Al-Thumairi Gate, and Dekhna Gate, Ad-Deerah Tower were restored and built.

=== Phase 3 (since 1992) ===
The third phase focused on winning confidence of the country's private sector. Headquarters of some institutions were constructed like the High Court, Civil Defense, Sheikh Muhammad bin Ibrahim Al Alsheikh Mosque, Dekhna Plaza, al-Zal Souq, and modern seven commercial complexes.

== Landmarks ==
=== Historical ===
- Al Hukm Palace
- Al Masmak Palace
- Safat Clocktower
- Deera Square
- Imam Turki bin Abdullah Grand Mosque
- Sheikh Muhammad bin Ibrahim Mosque
- Hilla Mosque
- Small Dakhna Mosque
- Thumairi Gate
- Dakhnah Gate

=== Marketplaces ===
- Souq al-Zal
- Swaigah Trade Center
- Al Maigliah Market Center
- Al Deira Market
- Souq al-Thumairi
- Al Tameer Wholesale Market
- Ibn Sulaiman Commercial Center

== In popular culture ==
The al-Hukm Palace was shown as the building of a fictitious Saudi immigration court in the 2023 Indian Hindi-language comedy drama film Dunki.

== Gallery ==
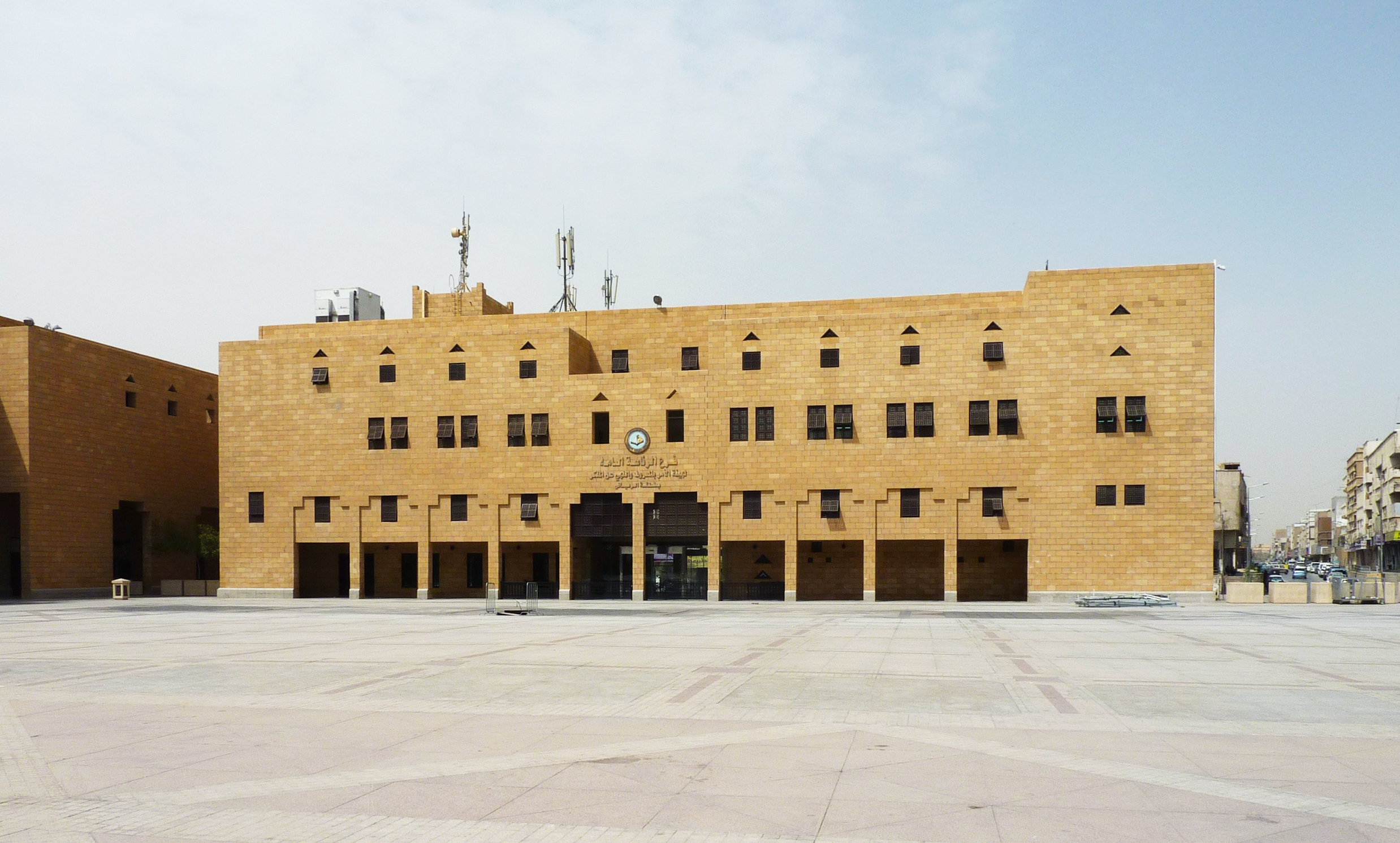
Deera Square, 2011

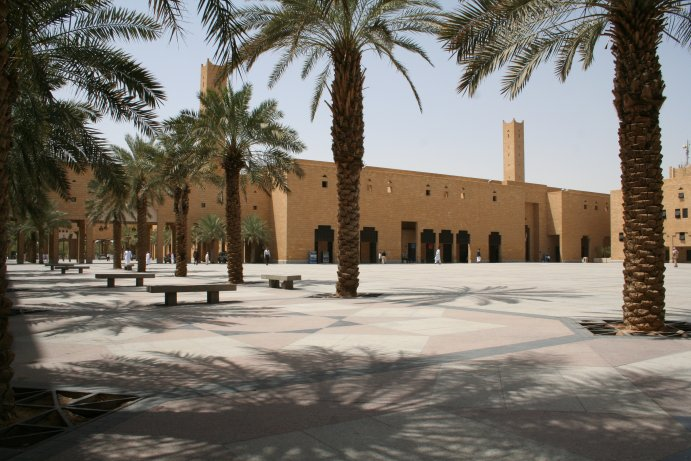
Imam Turki bin Abdullah Grand Mosque, 2007

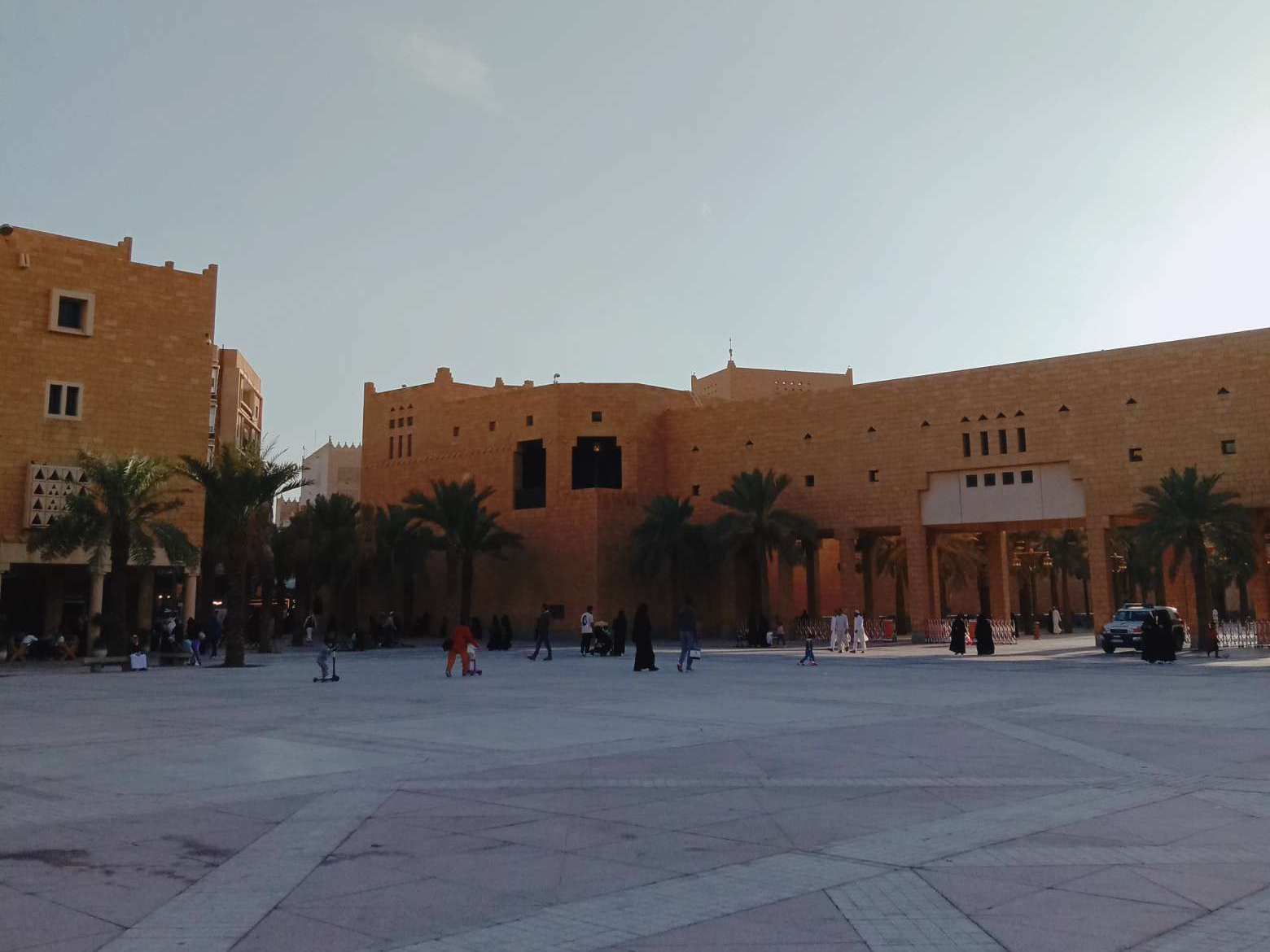
Al Hukm Palace, 2022

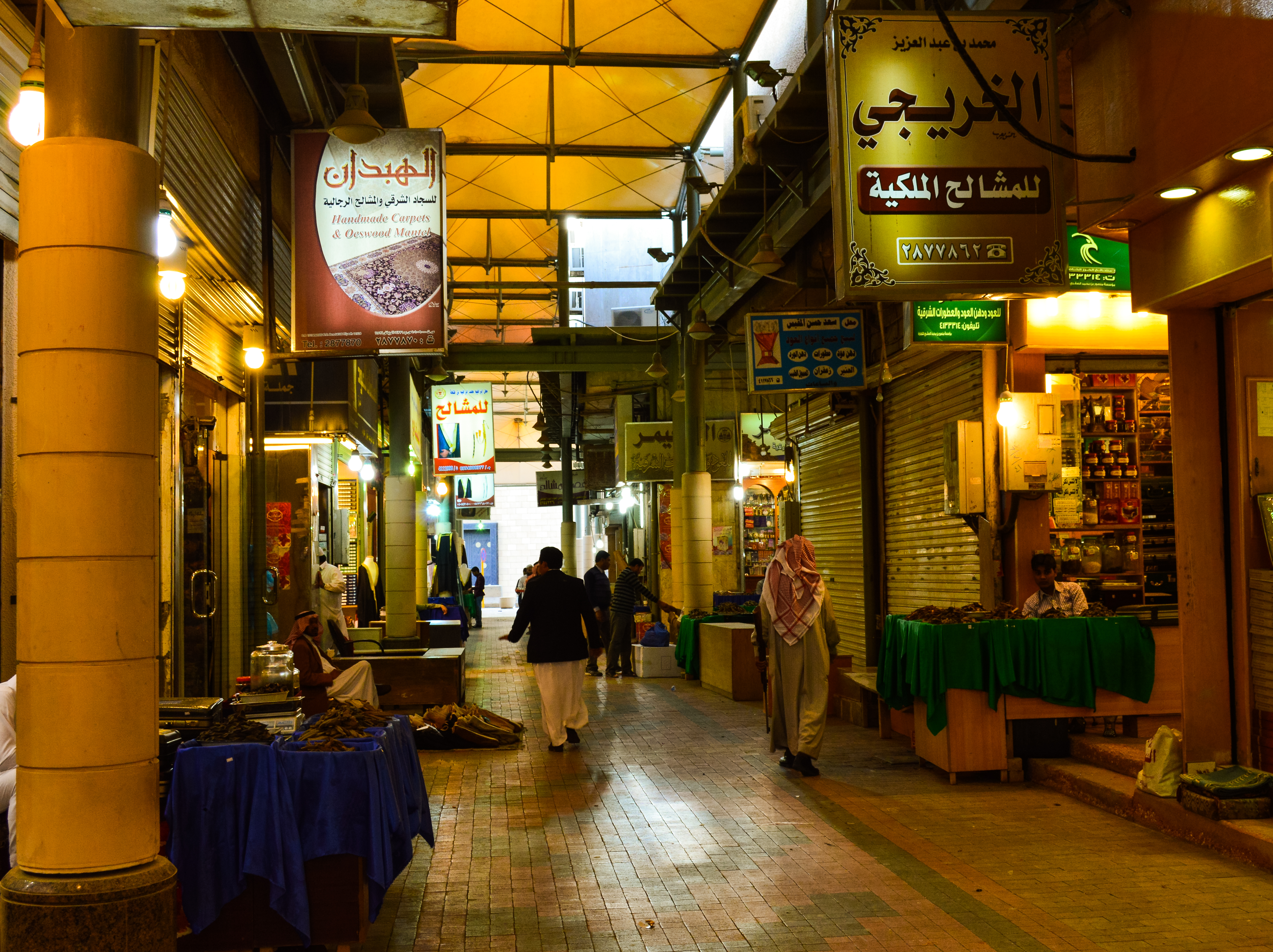
Souq al-Zal, 2014

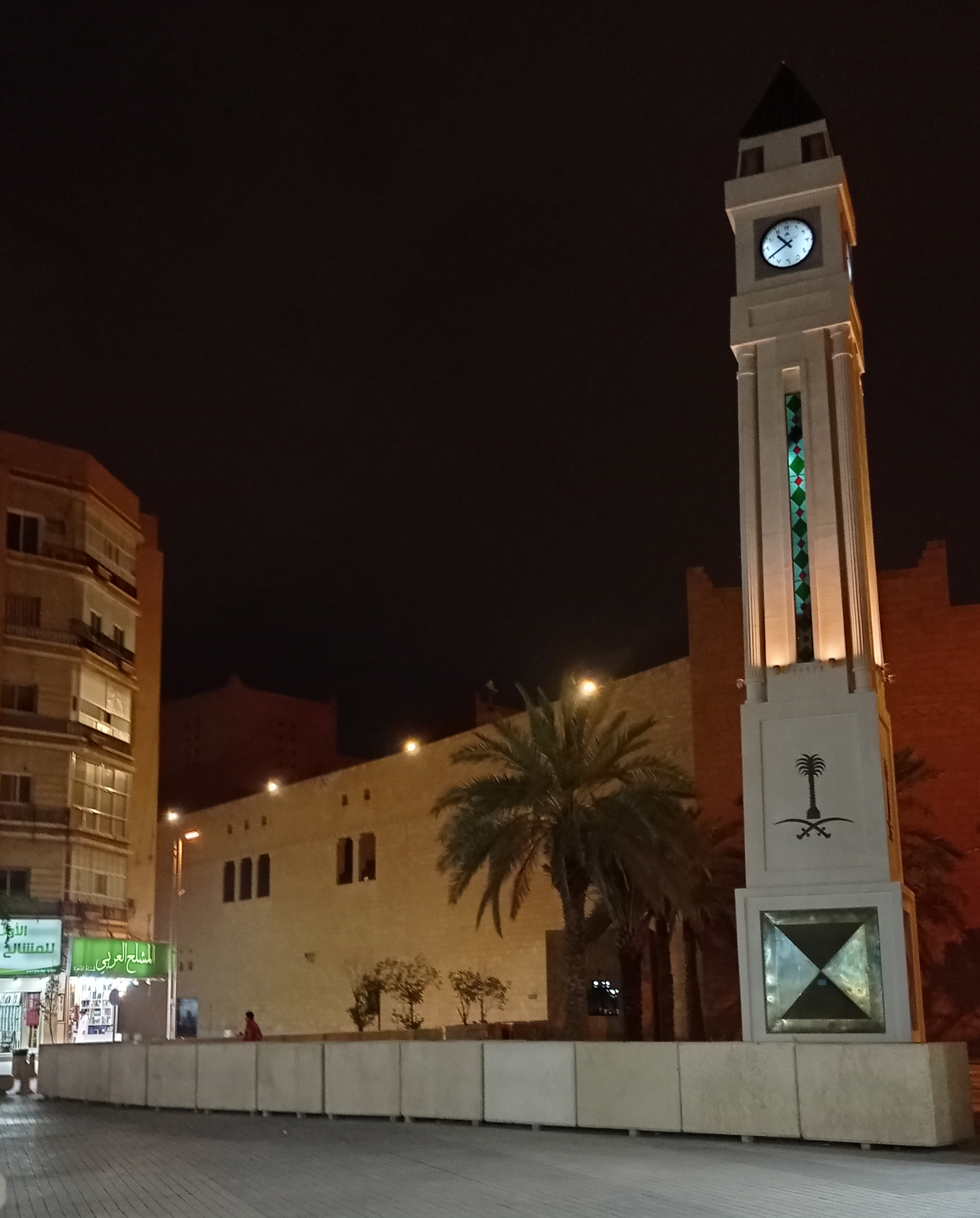
Safat Clocktower, 2023

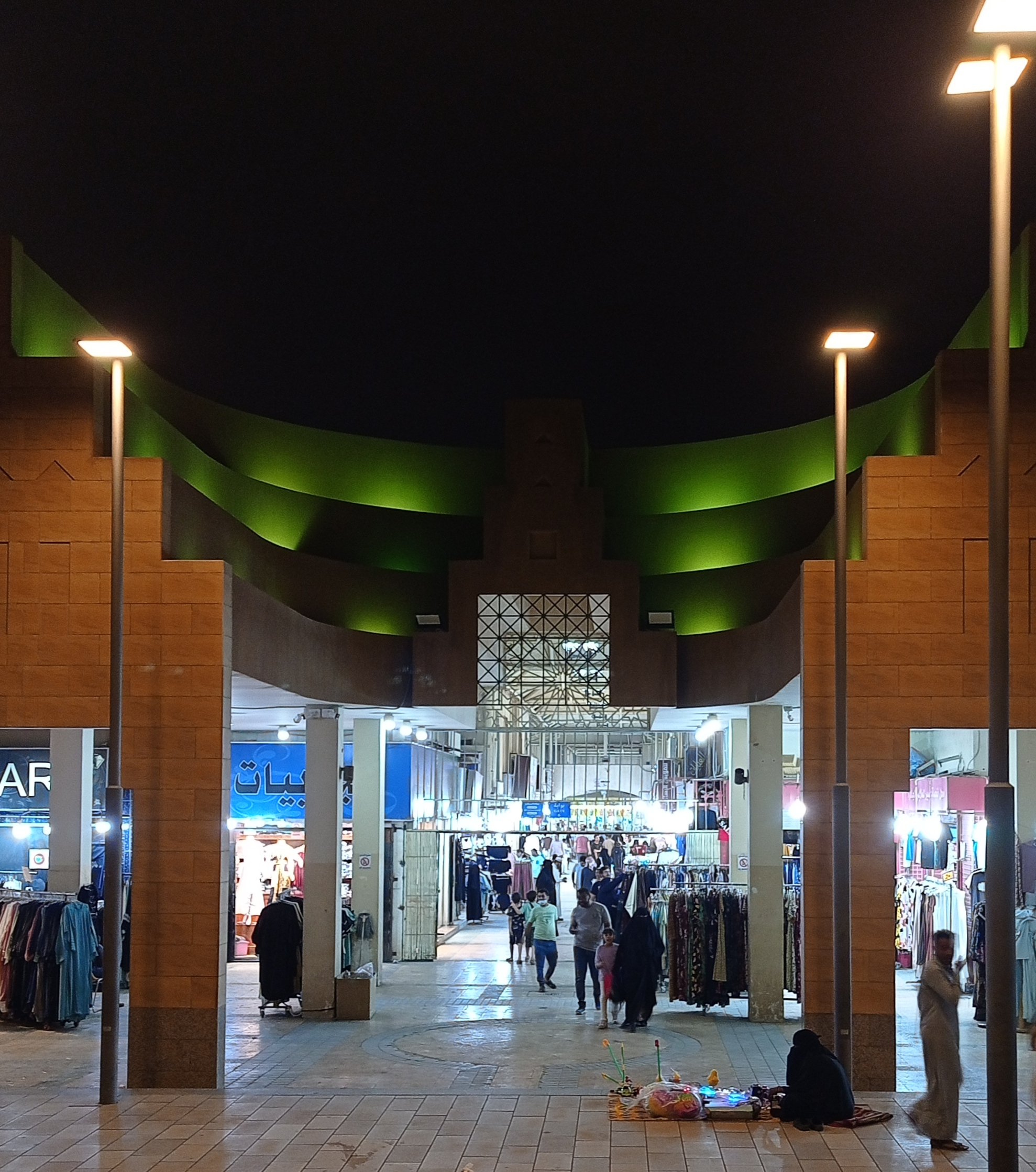
Souq al-Suweigah, 2023

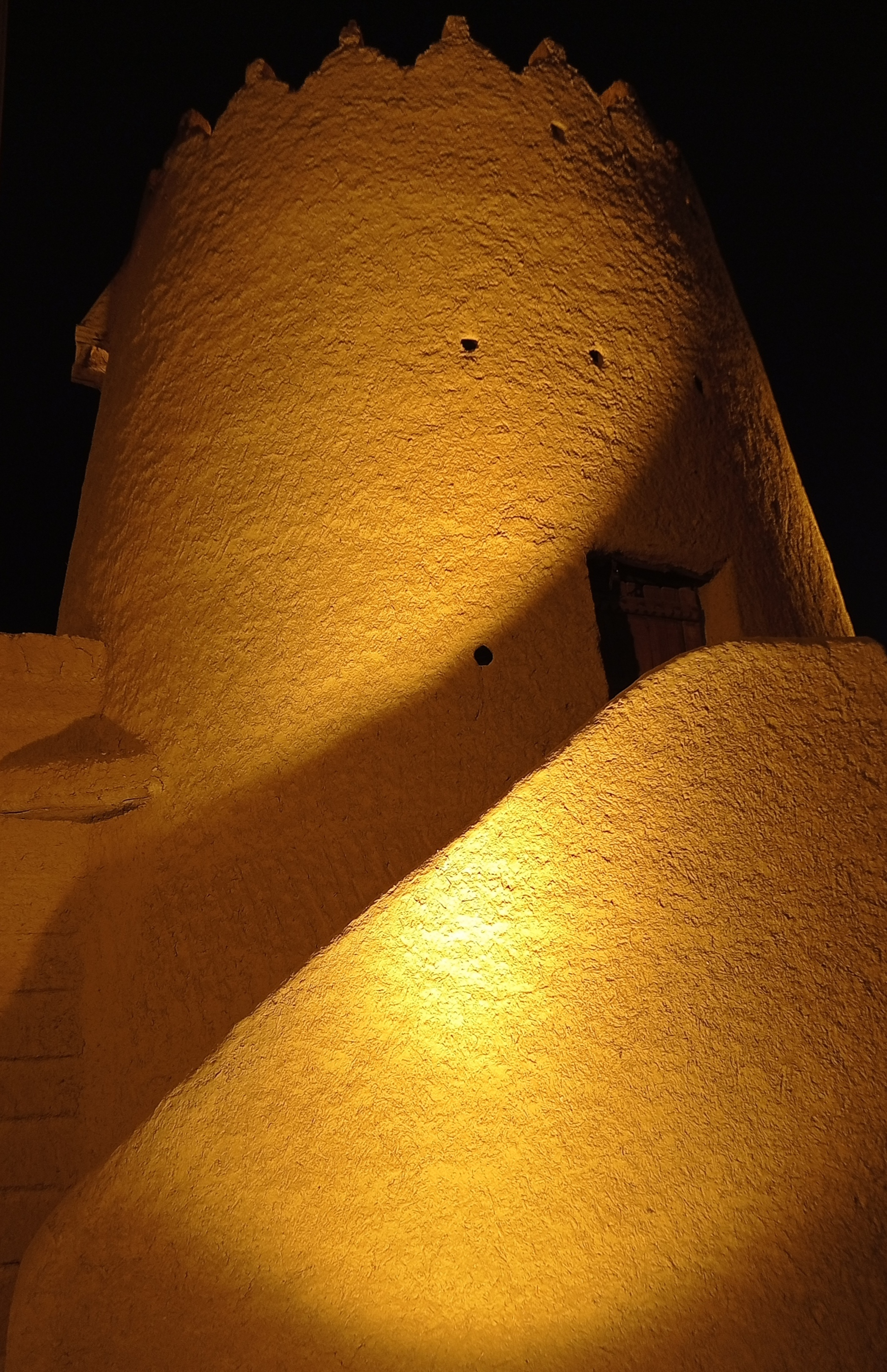
Al Thumairi Gate, 2023

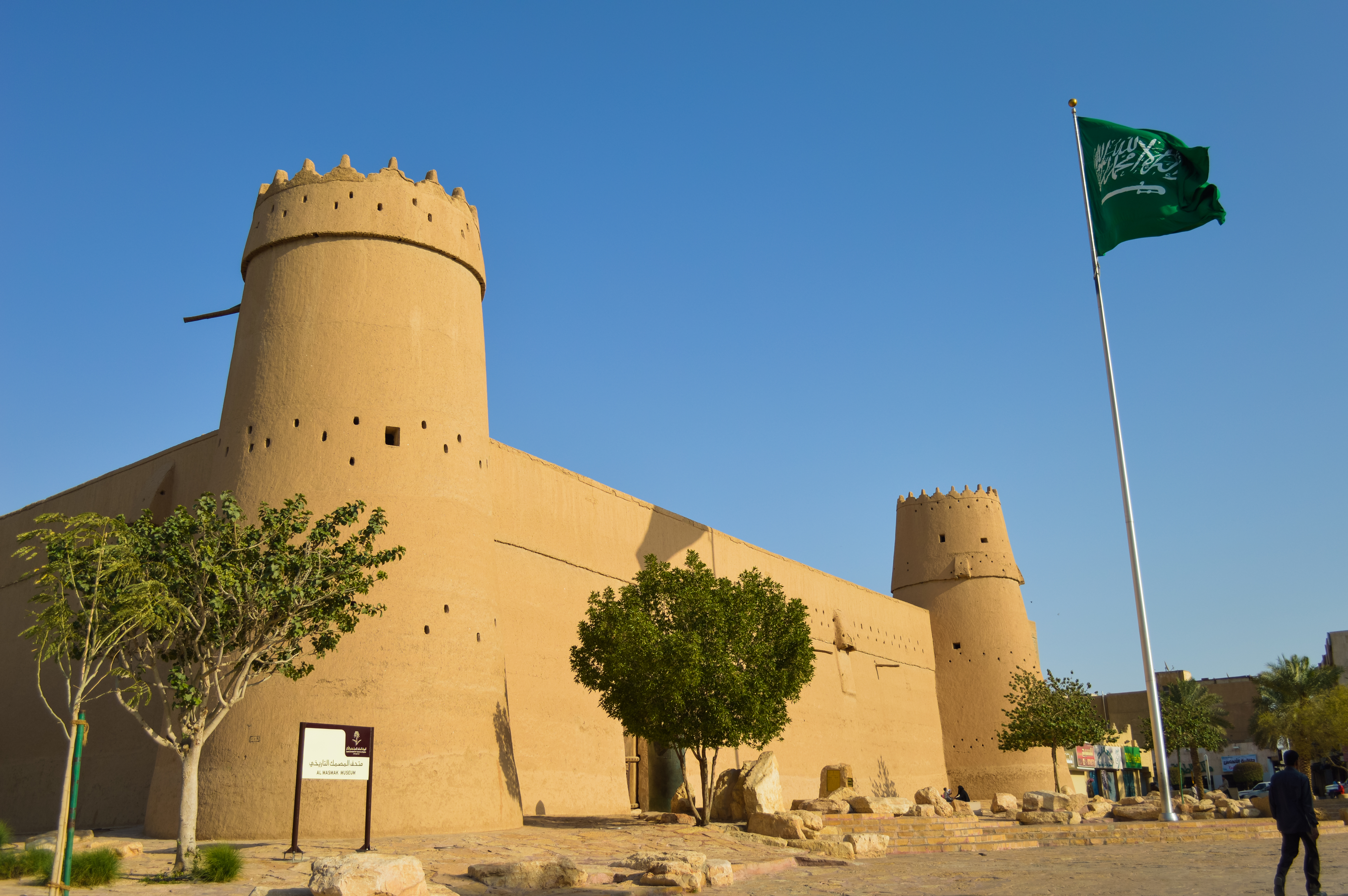
Masmak Fortress, 2014

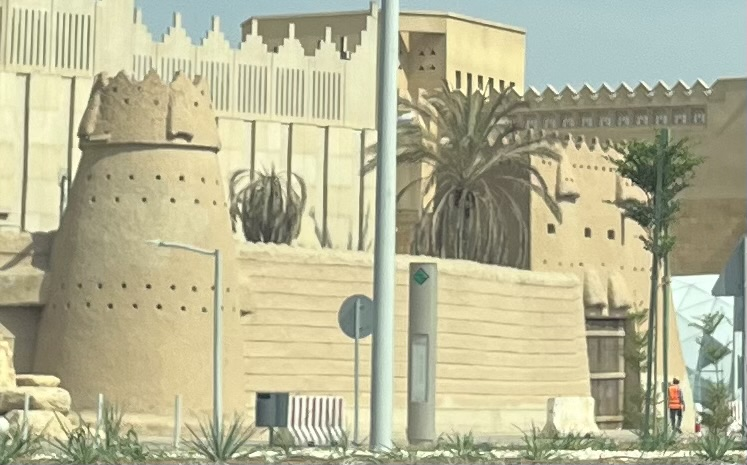
Dakhnah Gate, 2024

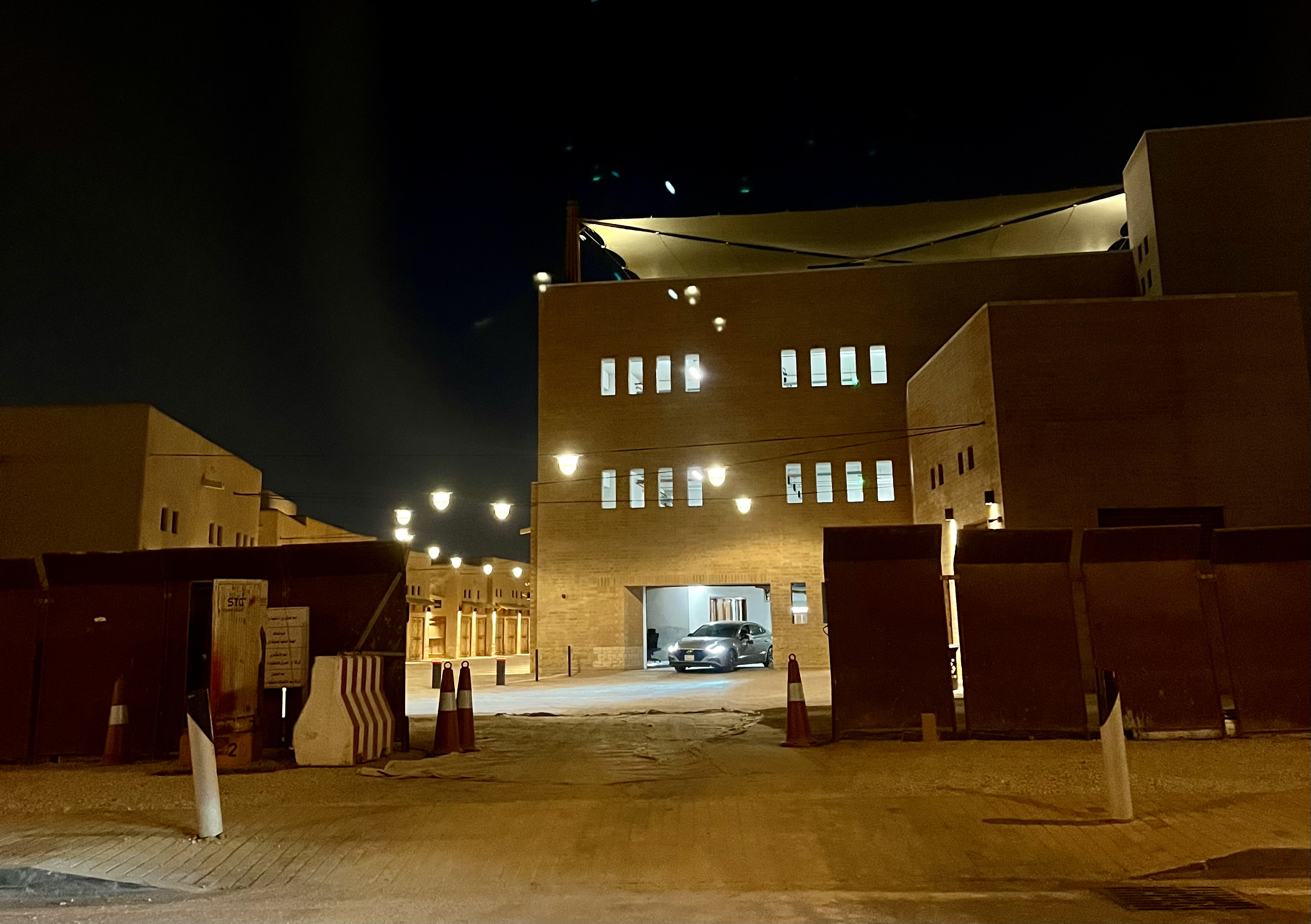
Al Doho district, 2024

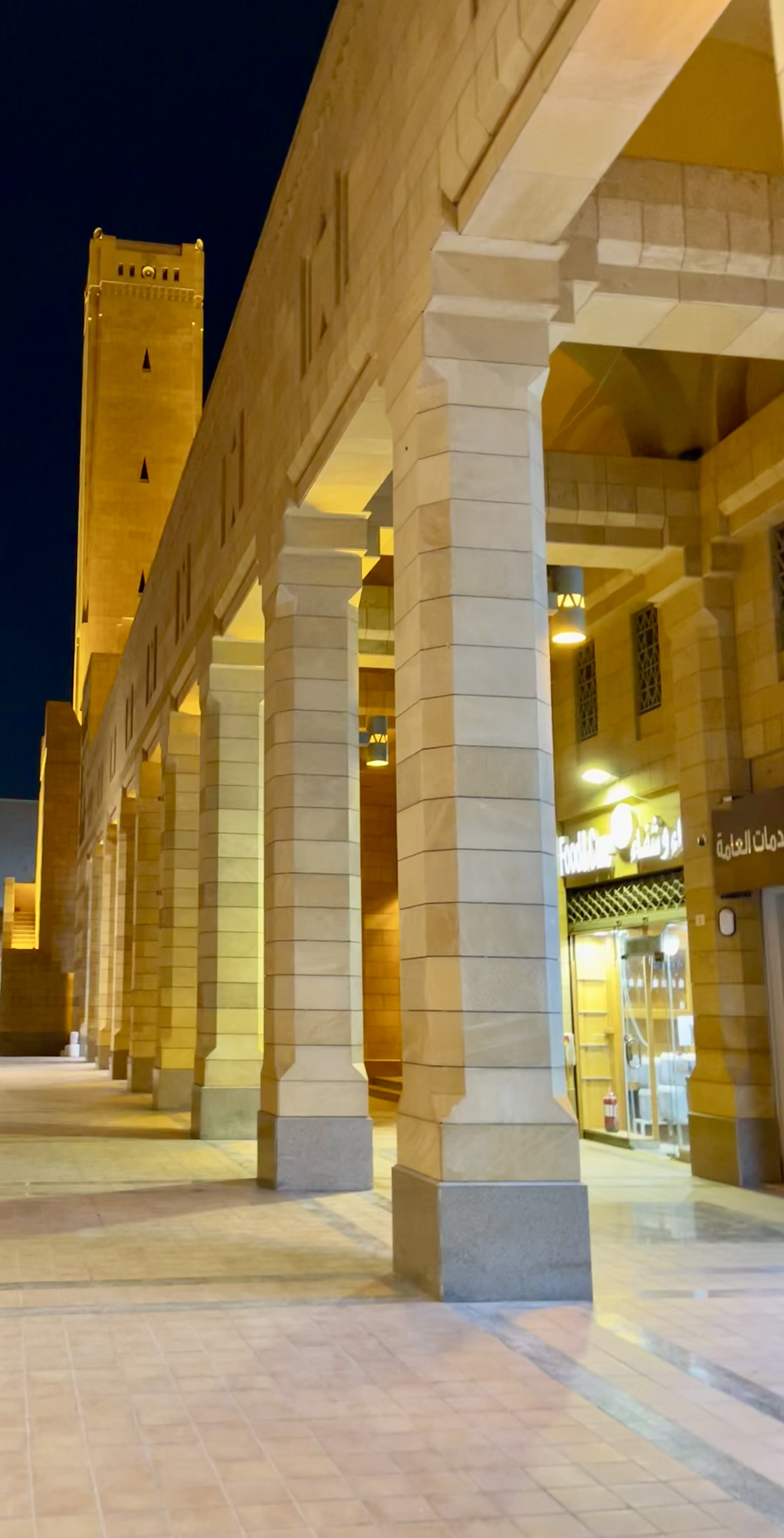
Sheikh Muhammad bin Ibrahim Mosque, 2024

Al Maigliah Market, 2024

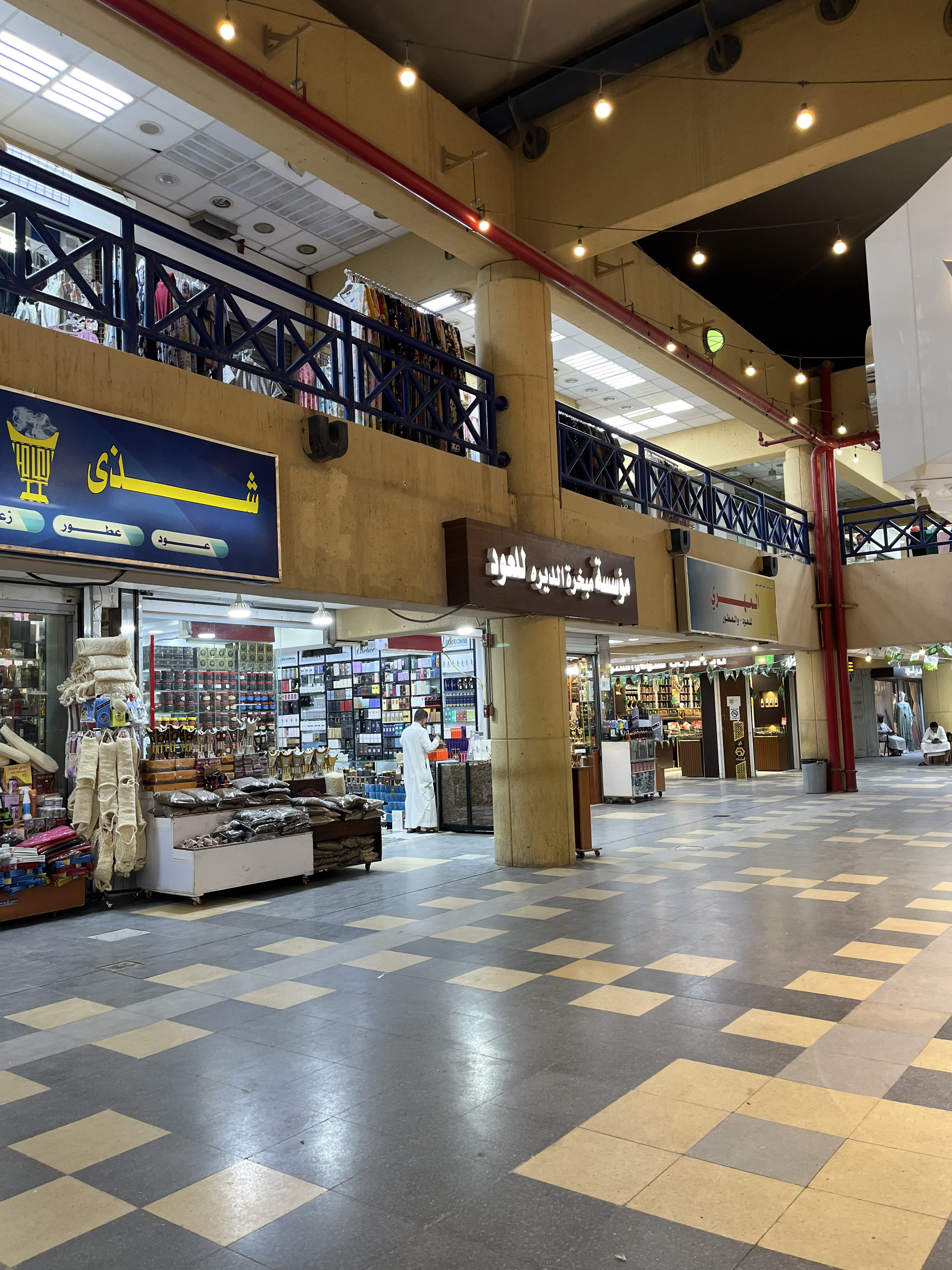
Souq Ushaiger, 2024

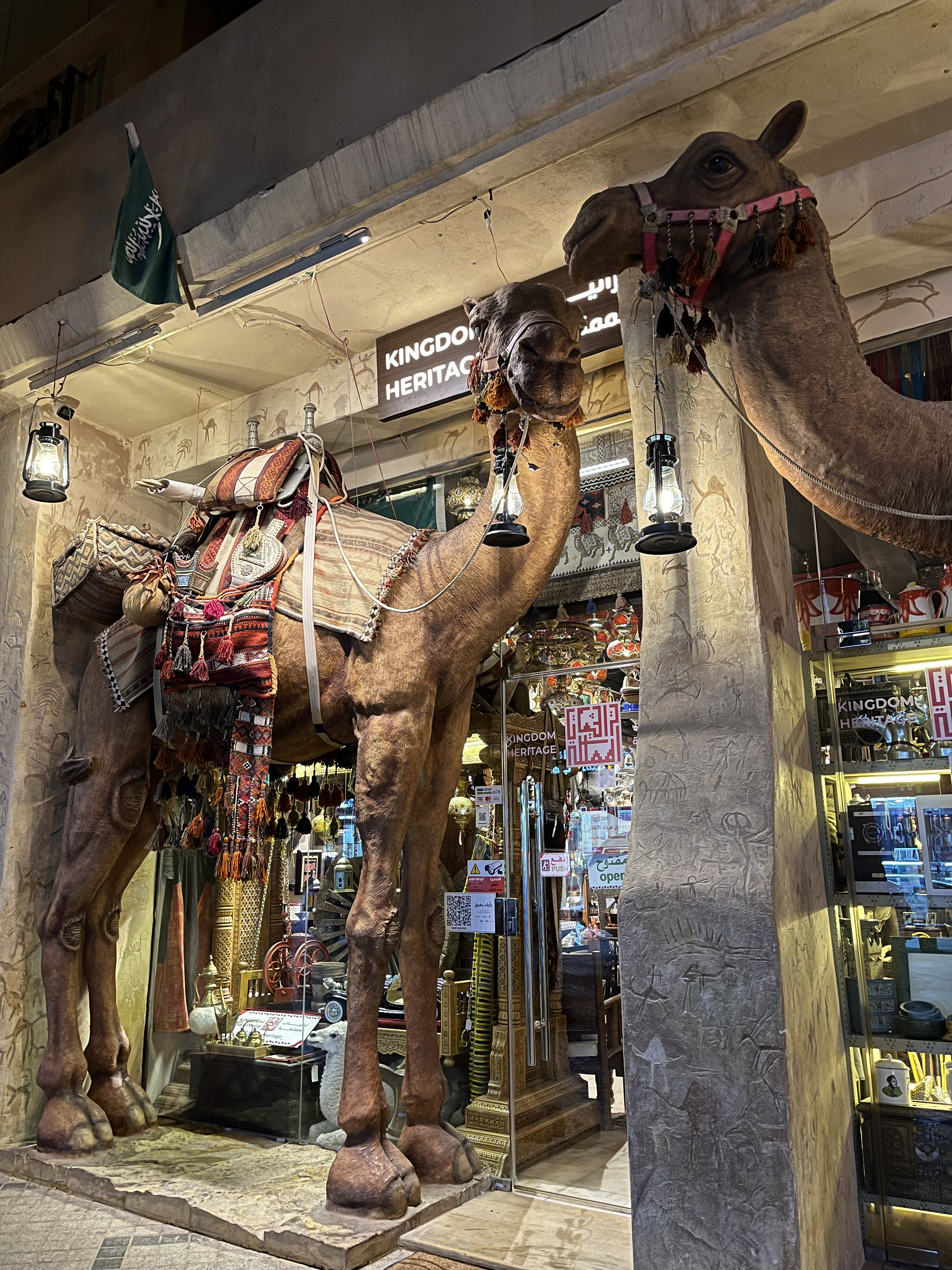
Life like figurines of camel at the Kingdom Heritage souvenir shop in Souq al-Thumairi.
