= Murqib Al-Hussain =

- مرقب الحسين (Arabic)
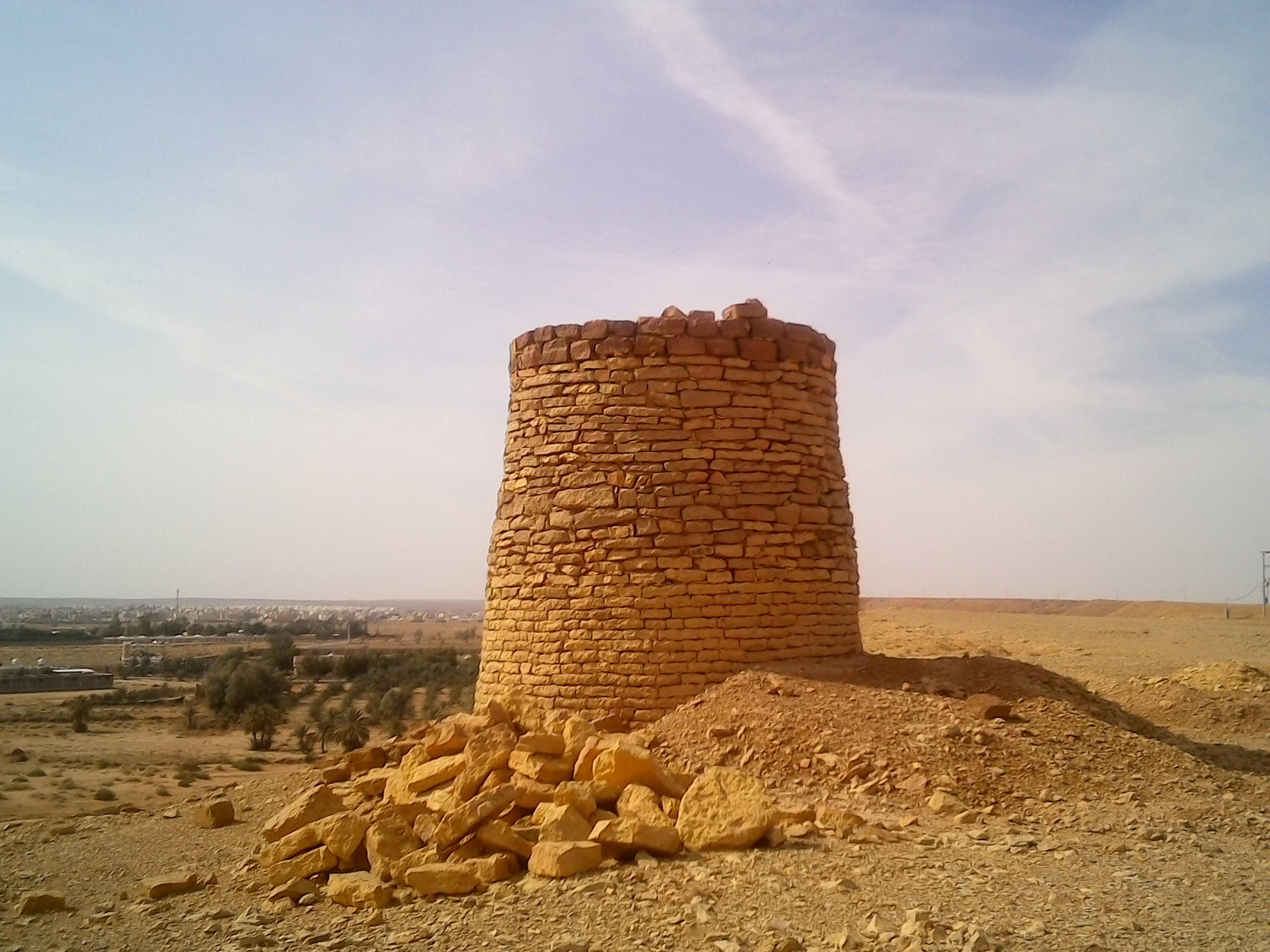
- Interactive map of Murqib Al-Hussain
- Type: watchtower
- Location: Shaqra, Saudi Arabia

Murqib Al-Hussain (Arabic: مرقب الحسين) (literally Al-Hussain Tower) is a historic watchtower located in the old town of Shaqra, Saudi Arabia. Built in 1899 (1318H), the tower was constructed using stone and mud and was historically used for surveillance and defense purposes.

== Site ==
The tower is situated east of the old district of Shaqra and northeast of the city, near the road connecting Shaqra and Ushaiqer. Its strategic placement on an elevated natural hill provides a commanding view of the valley that encompasses the town.

== Architecture ==
Al-Hussain Tower features a cylindrical design, with a circular base that widens at the bottom and gradually narrows toward the top, giving it an appearance of stability and resilience. Unique construction techniques include the following:

- No entrance The interior of the tower is filled with soil, possibly to prevent intrusions. Access to the top may have been facilitated by a movable ladder, ensuring the safety of those seeking refuge inside.
- Local materials: Large, unpolished stones from the surrounding natural environment and nearby mountains were used for the tower's construction, enhancing its durability.
- Adjacent mosque: Near the tower, remnants of an old mosque can be found, with only the stone foundations still intact.

== Structural features ==
The main components of Al-Hussain Tower include:

- Foundation: Built with local stone.
- Walls: Constructed from a mixture of mud and stone.
- Roofing: Made from wooden beams of tamarisk trees, covered with palm fronds.

The tower's solitary height and simple yet effective design reflect its historical function as a defensive structure.
