= Chop =

Chop, CHOP, Chops, or CHOPS may refer to:

== Medicine ==
- Children's Hospital of Philadelphia, one of the largest and oldest children's hospitals in the world
- CHOP (chemotherapy), a chemotherapy treatment for non-Hodgkin's lymphoma
- DNA damage-inducible transcript 3, a genetic protein also known as "CHOP", for "C/EBP-homologous protein"

== Music ==
- Embouchure, in music, a synonym for chops (and later, more broadly, musical skill or ability)
- CHOPS, an Asian-American hip hop producer, rapper and member of rap group Mountain Brothers
- Chops (Euros Childs album), 2006
- Chops (Joe Pass album), 1978
- Chopping, a form of sampling in music in which a sample is subdivided into smaller fragments that are then rearranged, as in chopped and screwed music.

== Sports ==
- Chop Robinson (born 2003), American football player
- Chop (wrestling), a move in professional wrestling
- Chops (juggling), a juggling pattern using three balls or clubs
- Knifehand strike, also known as a karate chop, a fast and focused strike with the side of the hand
- Backspin, a shot such that the ball rotates backwards after it is hit, especially in table tennis or other racket sports
- Chop block (gridiron football), a now-illegal blocking technique

== Other uses ==
- Chop, Ukraine, a city
  - Chop railway station
- Meat chop, a cut of meat usually containing a rib and served as an individual portion
- Seal (East Asia), or "chop" colloquially, used in East Asia to prove identity
- Chop (film), a 2011 American horror film
- Chop (fiberglass), a form of fiberglass
- Cold heavy oil production with sand, a technique for extracting difficult heavy crude oil
- Capitol Hill Occupied Protest, a short-lived self-proclaimed autonomous zone in Seattle

== See also ==
- Mutton chops, a colloquial term for sideburns
- Chop Chop (disambiguation)
- Chopped (disambiguation)
- Chopping (disambiguation)
