= Souq al-Zal =

Traditional souq in ad-Dirah, Riyadh, Saudi Arabia

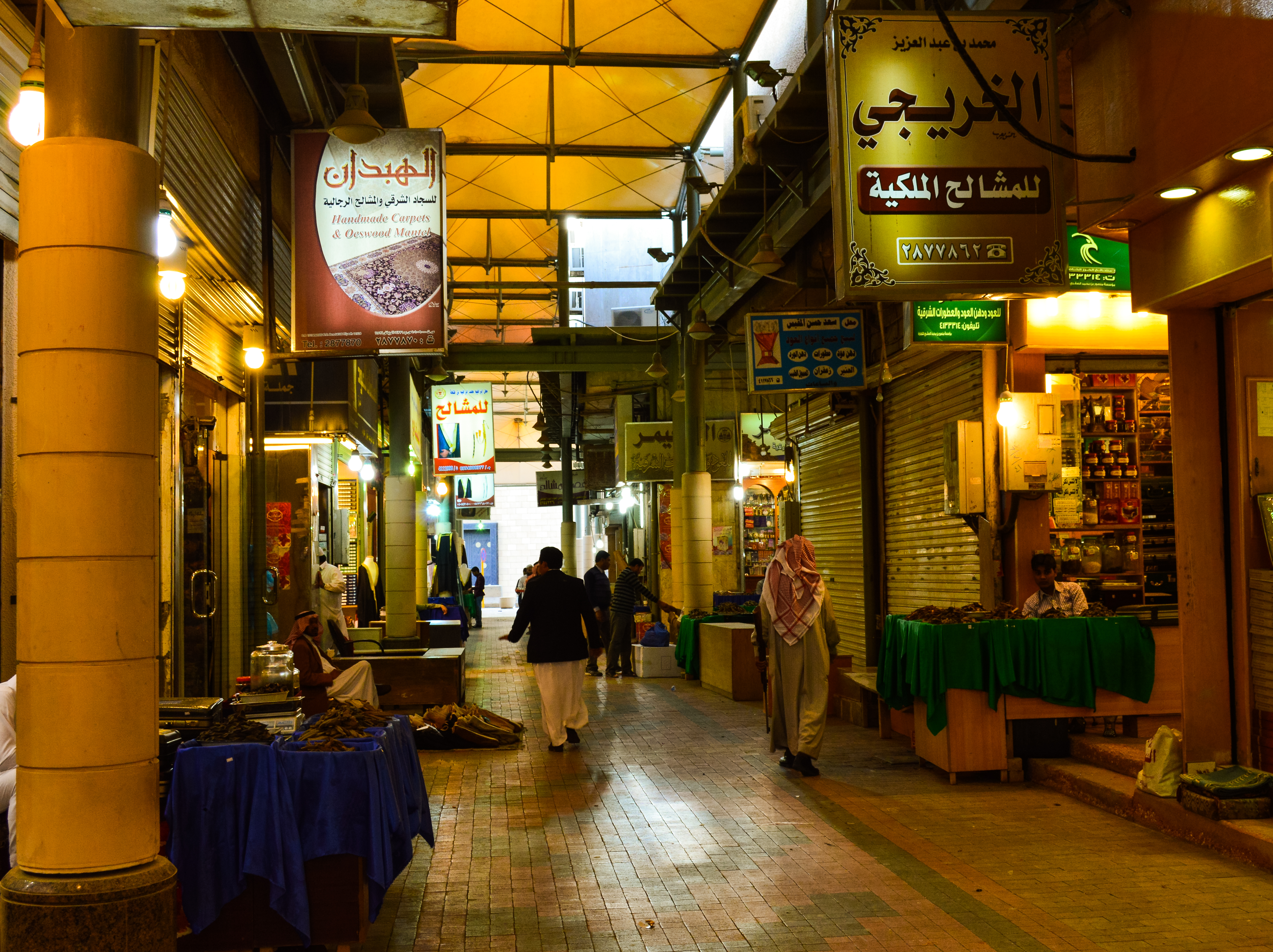
- Souq al-Zal, 2014
- Interactive map of Souq al-Zal
- Native name: سوق الزل
- Area: 38,580 square metres (9.53 acres)
- Location: ad-Dirah, Riyadh, Saudi Arabia
- Coordinates: 24°37′45″N 46°42′44″E

Souq al-Zal (Arabic: سوق الزل) is a traditional marketplace (souq) and a popular tourist attraction in the ad-Dirah neighborhood of Riyadh, Saudi Arabia. It is situated east of the al-Hukm Palace compound in the Qasr al-Hukm District and is one of the oldest marketplaces in the city that specialize in carpets trading and the sale of agarwoods. Covering an area of almost 9.5 acres, the souq's origins date as far back as 1901. Its name is derived from zulliya (Arabic: زولية, romanized: zūlīya), the Gulf Arabic word for floor rug and was located near the erstwhile Dakhna quarter.

The Royal Commission for Riyadh City had completed the renovation project for the souq in 2005. Souq al-Zal was selected as one of the 15 entertainment zones by the General Entertainment Authority of Saudi Arabia during the 2022 edition of Riyadh Season.
