= Chop Chop =

Chop Chop may refer to:

== Arts, entertainment, and media ==
=== Fictional characters ===
- Chop Chop, a character in the Blackhawk comic book series
- Chop Chop, an playable Undead character in the Skylanders video game franchise

=== Music ===
- Chop Chop (band), an electropop band out of Los Angeles
- Chop Chop (Bell X1 album), 2013
- Chop Chop (The Academy Is... album), the working title of the album Santi
- "Chop Chop" (song), the second single by rap group YoungBloodZ
- "Chop-Chop", a 1982 single by British post-punk band Killing Joke

=== Other uses in arts, entertainment, and media ===
- Chop Chop (2001 film), a Danish comedy film directed by Niels Arden Oplev
- Chop Chop (2020 film), an American horror thriller film

== Places ==
- Chop Chop, Iran, a village in Zanjan Province, Iran
- Chop Chop Square, a name given to Deera Square in Riyadh, Saudi Arabia.

== Other uses ==
- Chop Chop (horse) (1940–1963), a Canadian Horse Racing Hall of Fame racehorse
- Chop chop (phrase), equivalent to "hurry" or "do it quickly"
- Chop-chop (tobacco), Australian English for home-grown tobacco
- DeMarcus "Chop Chop" Corley (born 1974), American boxer

== See also ==
- Chop shop
