= Al Thumairi Gate =

Al-Thumairi Gate
- بوابة الثميري (Arabic)
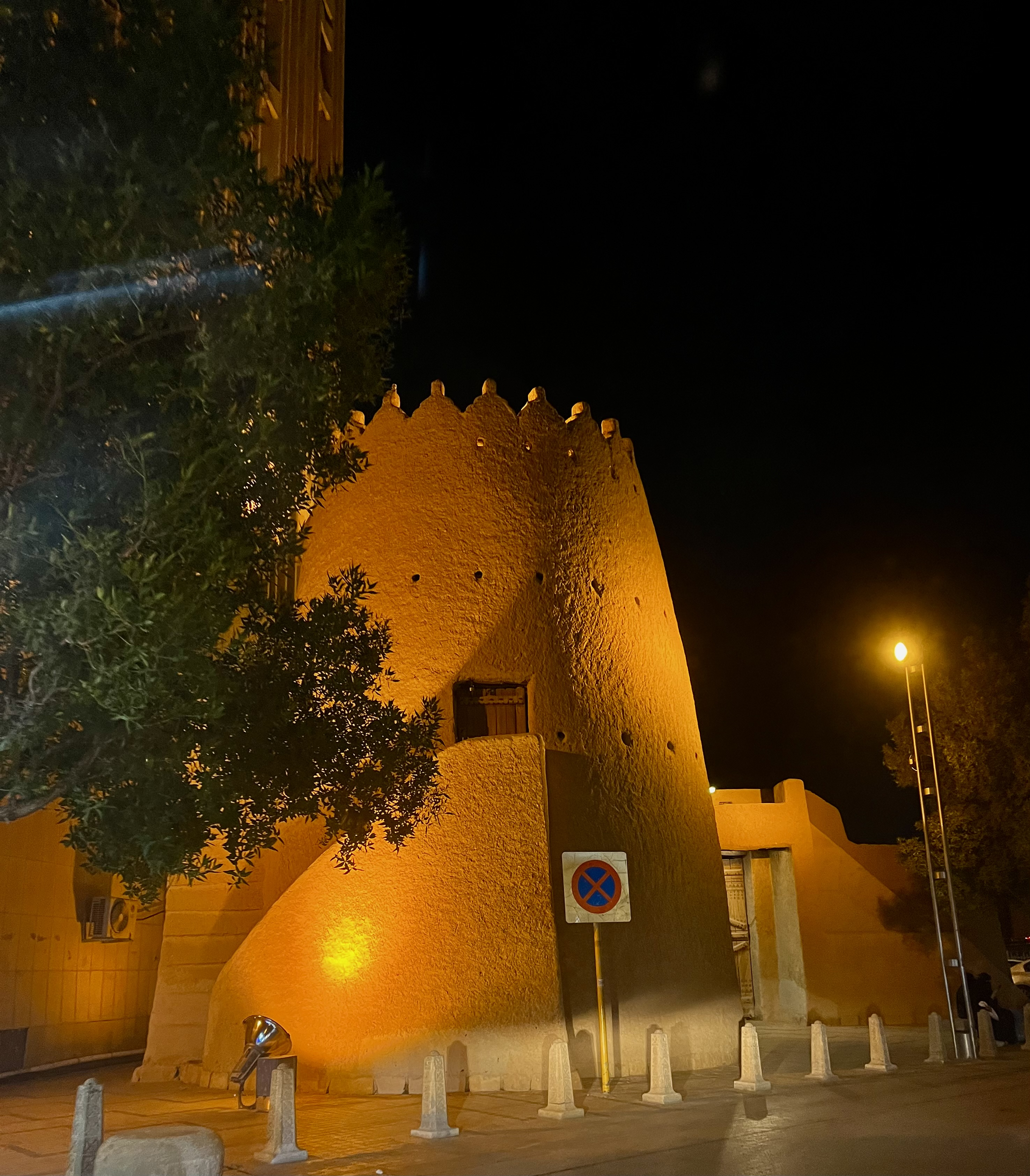
- Al Thumairi Gate, 2024
- Interactive map of Al-Thumairi Gate
- 24°37′51″N 46°42′55″E
- Location: King Faisal Road, ad-Dirah, Riyadh, Saudi Arabia

History
- Built: 18th century
- Demolished: 1954

Site notes
- Restored: 1902; 1992
- Restored by: Abdulaziz ibn Saud (1902); Salman bin Abdulaziz (1992)

Al-Thumairi Gate (Arabic: بوابة الثميري), historically Darwaza al-Thumairi (Arabic: دروازة الثميري) and alternatively known as Bab al-Marwah (Arabic: باب المروة) and al-Ahsa Gate (Arabic: بوابة الأحساء), is an 18th-century earth-structured fortified gateway attached with a cylindrical mudbrick watchtower in the ad-Dirah neighborhood of Riyadh, Saudi Arabia, located in the eastern part of Qasr al-Hukm District. Named after Hassan al-Thumairi, a guard who was killed in action during the Battle of Dalaqa in 1747, it is one of the last remaining gates of Riyadh's old city walls and served as the main entrance to the walled town from the east until 1954. when the city wall was dismantled in early 1950s. The structure was restored by 1992 during the development of Qasr Al Hukm District.

The historic al-Thumairi Street, a thoroughfare which runs from east to west in the Qasr al-Hukm District, is named after the gateway.

al-Thumairi Gate is one of the ten gates of the former city walls of Riyadh and one of the two remaining similar constructions, other being the Dakhna Gate, that now remain in the aftermath of the wall's demolition in the 1950s.

During the reign of King Faisal bin Abdulaziz, Saudi authorities began focusing on the resuscitation and rejuvenation of the area surrounding the al-Hukm Palace and the preservation of historical and architectural significance of the former walled town.

In March 1973, King Faisal bin Abdulaziz issued directives to Sheikh Abdulaziz Thunayyan, then mayor of Riyadh to conduct an extensive study of the area surrounding the al-Hukm Palace and implementing the project of its renovation the following year. In 1976, the High Commission for the Development of Arriyadh commissioned the Qasr Al-Hukm District Development Project and agreed on developmental programs that were prepared to transform the Qasr al-Hukm District into a cultural center. The designs were completed by 1979 and the construction lasted between 1983 and 1992 in broadly two phases, costing around US$500 million. The project was overseen by Prince Salman bin Abdulaziz al-Saud, the-then governor of Riyadh. It was renovated between 1988 and 1992 as part of the second phase of the Qasr Al-Hukm District Development Project.
