= Safat Clocktower =

Historic clocktower in ad-Dirah, Riyadh, Saudi Arabia

- برج ساعة الصفاة
- Safat Clocktower, 2026
- Interactive map of Safat Clocktower
- Alternative names: Big Ben of Saudi Arabia

General information
- Location: Qasr al-Hukm District, al-Dirah, Riyadh, Saudi Arabia
- Coordinates: 24.63019°N 46.71191°E
- Opened: 20 April 1966; 59 years ago

Safat Clocktower (Arabic: برج ساعة الصفاة), so called from the plaza it overlooks from the east, and colloquially nicknamed Big Ben of Saudi Arabia (Arabic: الساعة ببيغ بن السعودية), is a freestanding historic clocktower in the ad-Dirah neighborhood of Riyadh, Saudi Arabia, located east of the al-Hukm Palace compound in the Qasr al-Hukm District, nearby Souq al-Thumairi. Built in 1966 using German technology, it once served as a popular cultural landmark in the city until the 1970s. It was renovated in the second phase of the Qasr Al-Hukm District Development Project between 1988 and 1992.
