= Al Maigliah Market Center =

- مركز المعيقلية التجاري
- Al Maigliah Market Center, 2024
- Location: Riyadh, Saudi Arabia
- Coordinates: 24°37′49″N 46°42′31″E
- Developer: Riyadh Holding Company
- Stores and services: 1000
- Parking: 2000

Al Maigliah Market Center (Arabic: مركز المعيقلية التجاري) is a traditional shopping complex in the ad-Dirah neighborhood of Riyadh, Saudi Arabia, located in the western part of the Qasr al-Hukm District. Built in the period 1988–1992 during the second phase of the Qasr Al Hukm District Development Project, it contains 1,000 shops divided into four sections specializing in the trade of traditional perfumes, gold, watches and fashion retail. It is named after the Muʼaykaliyah quarter of the former walled town, where it stands.

== History and background ==
Following the dismantling of the city walls in the 1950s, the Mugailiyah quarter, just like other quarters of the former walled town, were incorporated into the current metropolis of Riyadh. As residents of the area began relocating to new affluent districts, the quarter evolved into a traditional marketplace during the 1950s and 1970s.

In March 1973, King Faisal bin Abdulaziz issued directives to Sheikh Abdulaziz Thunayyan, then mayor of Riyadh to conduct an extensive study of the area surrounding the al-Hukm Palace and implementing the project of its renovation the following year. In 1976, the High Commission for the Development of Arriyadh commissioned the Qasr Al Hukm District Development Project and agreed on developmental programs that were prepared to transform the Qasr al-Hukm District into a cultural center. The designs were completed by 1979 and the construction lasted between 1983 and 1992 in broadly two phases, costing around US$500 million. The project was overseen by Prince Salman bin Abdulaziz, the-then governor of Riyadh.

In 1985, the Maigliah Markets Company Limited was established as a real state firm, which got later renamed as Riyadh Holding Company. The company was responsible with renovation of the market, which was built during the second phase of the Qasr Al Hukm District between 1988 and 1992 in modern Najdi architectural style.
