= Chopped =

Chopped may refer to:

- Chopped and screwed, a technique of remixing hip hop music
- Chopped (TV series), a cooking reality television series which first aired in January 2009
- Short name for the salad restaurant chain Freshly Chopped

== See also ==
- Chop (disambiguation)
