= Swaigah Trade Center =

Traditional souq in ad-Dirah, Riyadh, Saudi Arabia

Souq al-Suweigah
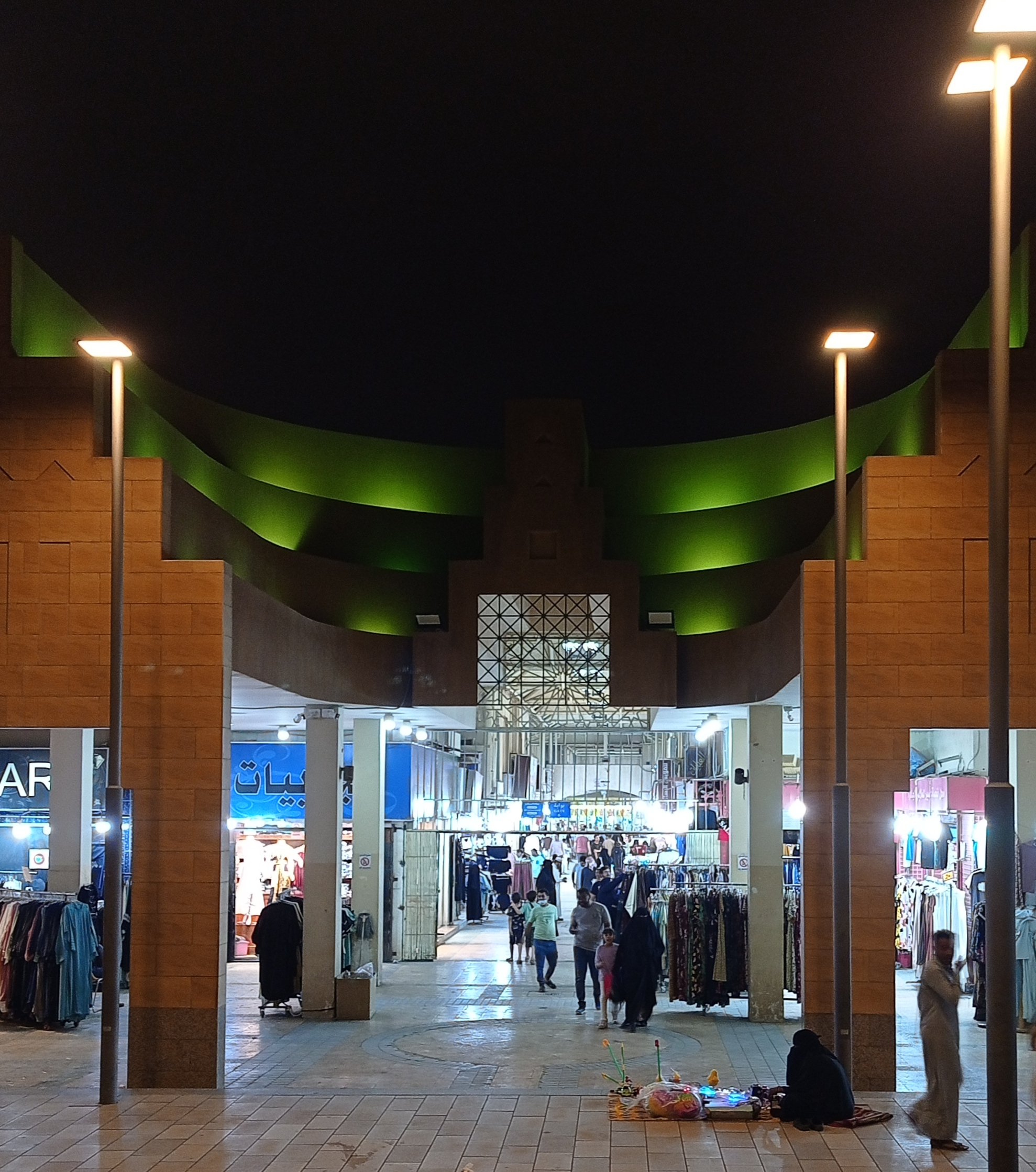
- Gate No. 2 of Souq al-Suweigah, 2023
- Native name: سوق السويقة
- Area: 2.5 hectares (6.2 acres)
- Location: ad-Dirah, Riyadh, Saudi Arabia
- Coordinates: 24°37′54″N 46°42′52″E

Swaigah Trade Center (Arabic: مركز سويقة التجاري), also known as Souq al-Suweigah (Arabic: سوق السويقة, lit. 'the stem market'), is a traditional marketplace (souq) and a shopping complex in the ad-Dirah neighborhood of Riyadh, Saudi Arabia, that emerged from the ruins of the al-Ajnab quarter. Covering an area of 6.2 acres, it is situated east of the Masmak Fortress in the Qasr al-Hukm District. It includes more than 260 shops that specialize in the trading of traditional perfumes, cosmetics and abayas.

The settlement lies on the ruins of the Al Ajnab settlement, which gradually went extinct following the dismantling of the city walls and subsequent expansion and modernization of Riyadh in the 1970s. The settlement evolved into Souq al-Suweigah and assumed most of its current form during the Qasr Al-Hukm District Development Project between 1983 and 1992.
