= Deera Square =

Public square in Riyadh, Saudi Arabia

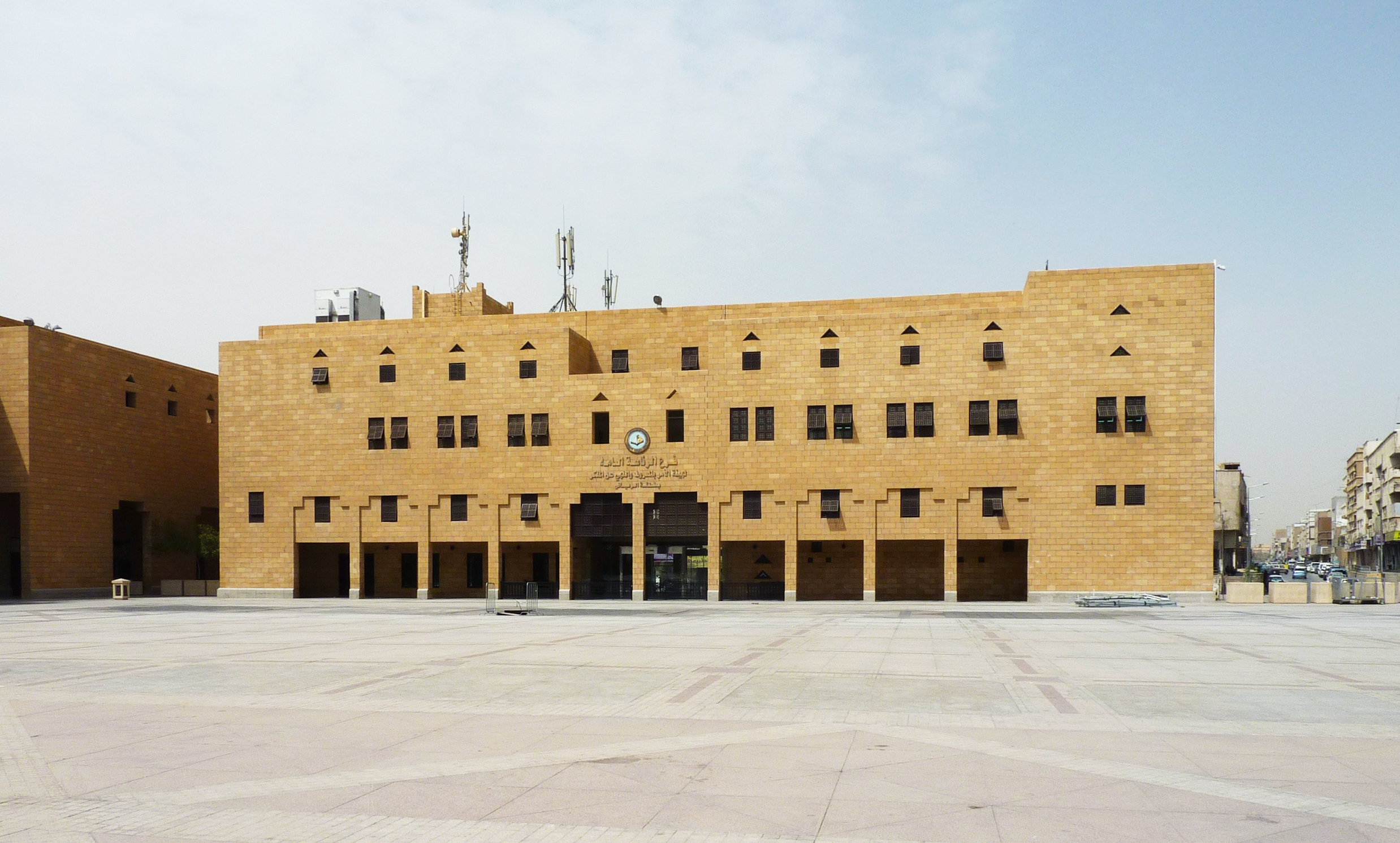
- Deera Square, 2011
- Interactive map of Deera Square
- Native name: ساحة الديرة (Arabic)
- Location: Ad-Dirah, Riyadh, Saudi Arabia
- Coordinates: 24.630884°N 46.711838°E

Other
- Known for: Public executions

Deera Square (Arabic: ساحة الديرة, romanized: Sāḥat ad-Dayrah), also known as Justice Square (ميدان العدل, Maydān al-ʿAdl), Safa Square (ساحة الصفاة, Sāḥat aṣ-Ṣafāh) or derisively as Chop-Chop Square, is a public space in the Ad-Dirah neighborhood of Riyadh, Saudi Arabia. It is located adjacent to the al-Hukm Palace compound and Imam Turki bin Abdullah Grand Mosque in the Qasr al-Hukm District. Historically, Deera Square was the site of public executions, where those sentenced to death in Saudi Arabia were publicly beheaded, although it had ceased to host executions by 2019.

At unannounced times, Saudi security forces and other officials cleared the area to make way for executions to take place. After the beheading of the condemned, the head was stitched to the body, which was wrapped up and taken away for the final rites. It was a crime to record, with photos or videos, the executions, despite the number of attendees witnessing such public events.

Saudi Arabia remains the only country with legal capital punishment by decapitation (beheading) – in 2022, recorded executions in Saudi Arabia reached 196, the highest number recorded in the country in 30 years – but beheadings are no longer carried out in public, with no public executions having been recorded in the country in 2022, after Red Crescent criticism and comparison between Saudi Arabia's and the Islamic State's practices.

== Publicity of the executions ==
In 2009, Canadian journalist Adam St. Patrick, who witnessed a public execution in the square, reported: "[T]he process is less overtly public now than it once was. Corpses aren't hung for display in the square as often, and beheadings drew much bigger crowds when they were a regular event, held on Fridays after noon prayers. No formal event or fanfare begins or ends them now, and nothing indicates awareness or concern about how alien this is to outsiders."

In 2015, it was reported that filming the public beheadings in Saudi Arabia had been forbidden. There was speculation that this was due to the international repercussion of public beheadings then carried out by the Islamic State, and the alleged "irony" of the fact that Saudi Arabia, being a key ally in the US-led coalition against the group, carried out the same sort of brutal punishments as the militant group.

== Gallery ==
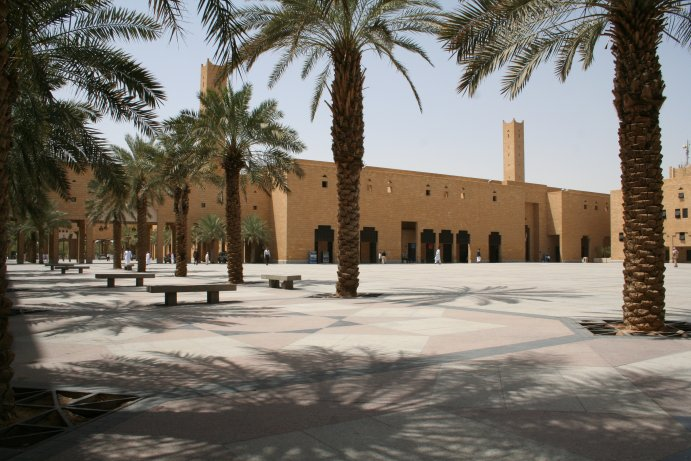
The square in 2007

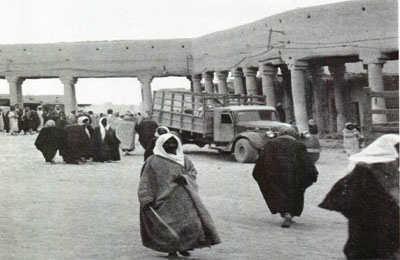
Deera Square, 1943

== See also ==
- Capital punishment in Saudi Arabia
