= Chopping =

Chopping may refer to:

- Chopping (astronomy), an instrumental technique to remove the background
- Chopping (sampling technique), a hip-hop sampling method.
- Chopping (violin), rapid tapping with the bow, used in jazz
- Chopping the blinds, in poker, when all players fold except the small and big blind, who take back their bets
- Virtual tuning, also called chopping, graphical modification of images of automobiles with software

== See also ==
- Chop (disambiguation)
