= Freshly Chopped =

Irish restaurant chain

- Type: Private
- Industry: Restaurant
- Founder: Brian Lee; Andy Chen
- Headquarters: Dublin, Ireland
- Number of locations: 60
- Area served: Ireland; United Kingdom; Cyprus; Netherlands
- Owner: Kent Lim
- Website: www.chopped.ie

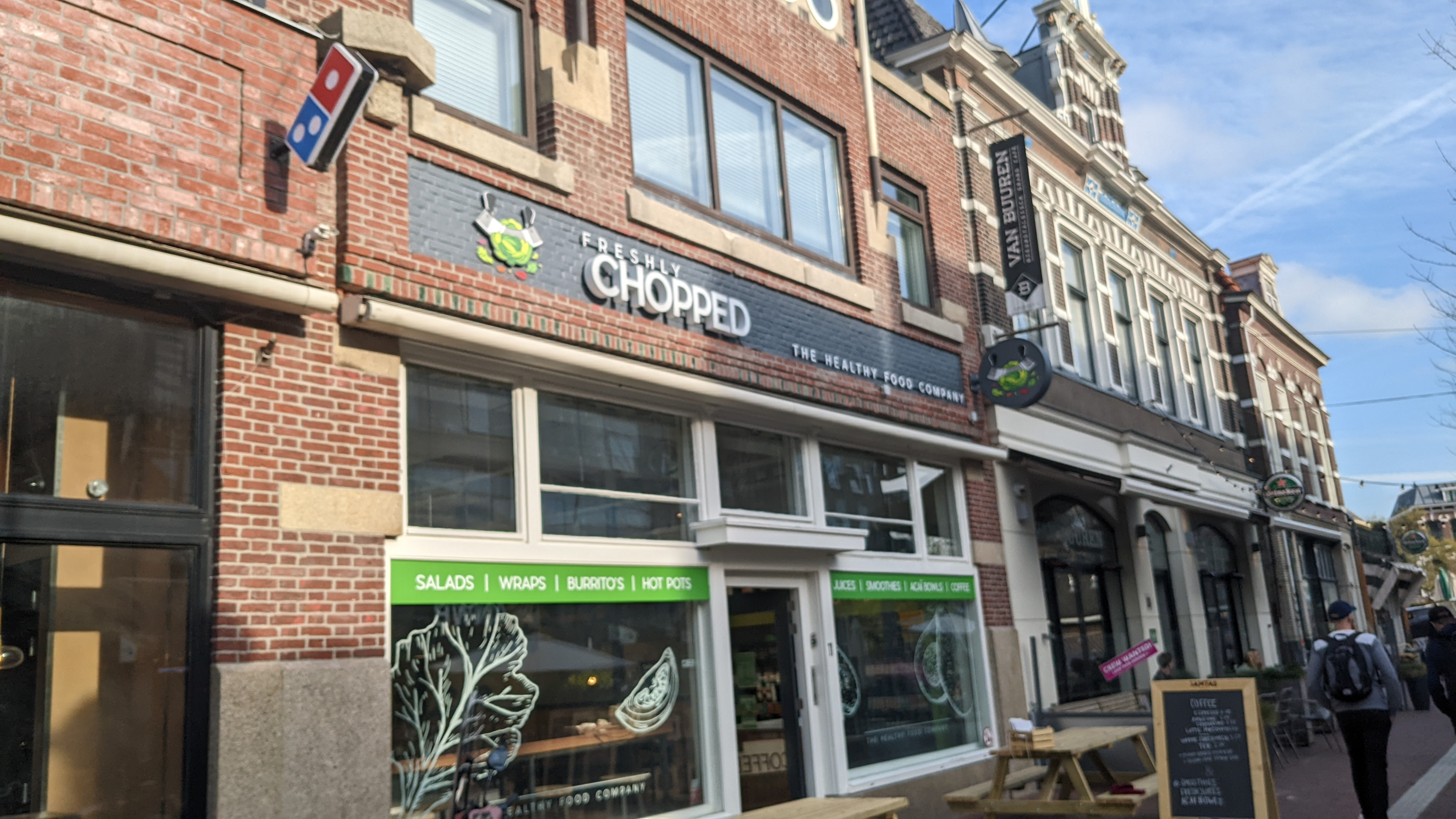
Restaurant in Leiden, Netherlands

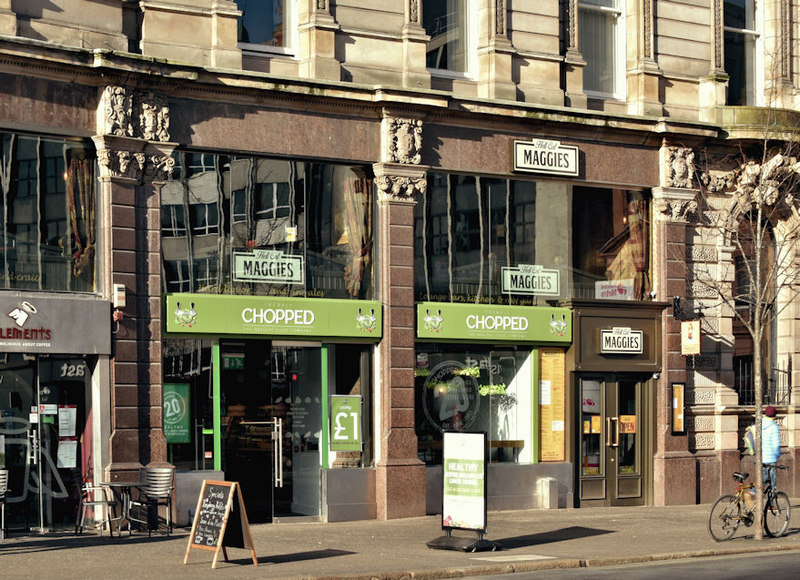
Restaurant in Belfast, Northern Ireland

Freshly Chopped, also simply called Chopped, is an Irish restaurant chain, serving salads and similar foods.

== History ==
The first Chopped outlet opened on Baggot Street, Dublin in May 2012, founded by Brian Lee and Andy Chen. The business began to franchise in 2016. In 2019, the business expanded to the United Kingdom and Cyprus.

On 27 June 2024, it was announced that the private equity firm KnightBridge Group had acquired a majority stake in the business.

== Food ==
Freshly Chopped serve salads, cut with their signature mezzaluna knives.
