= Chop Chop (2020 film) =

- Directed by: Rony Patel
- Written by: Rony Patel; Andrew Ericksen
- Produced by: Rony Patel
- Starring: Atala Arce; Jake Taylor
- Cinematography: Ryan Emanuel; Carter Fawcett
- Edited by: Rony Patel
- Production company: Fairwolf Productions
- Distributed by: Gravitas Ventures; Kamikaze Dogfight
- Release date: 20 October 2020
- Running time: 81 minutes
- Country: United States
- Language: English

Chop Chop is a 2020 American horror thriller film directed by Rony Patel, starring Atala Arce and Jake Taylor.

== Cast ==
- Atala Arce as Liv
- Jake Taylor as Chuck
- David Harper as Teddy

== Release ==
The film was released on Amazon Prime Video, iTunes, Comcast, Spectrum and Vudu on 20 October 2020.

== Reception ==
Tori Danielle of PopHorror wrote a positive review of the film, calling it a "crazy story with great performances, twits and turns, and nonstop action." Dakota Dahl of Rue Morgue wrote a positive review of the film, writing that "The film is fun and weird, with levels of mystery that evolve and resolve throughout the whole run time, making it easy to watch from start to finish without getting bored."

Chance Solem-Pfeifer of Willamette Week rated the film 2 stars out of 4, writing that "The fact that Rony Patel's would-be slasher film pivots so quickly and aggressively away from an unstoppable-monster bloodbath is potentially to his creative credit, but unfortunately, no part of the disturbed underworld odyssey that follows works anywhere near as well." Rich Cross of Starburst rated the film 2 stars out of 5, writing that "There’s plenty of ambition in evidence in what is Patel’s feature debut, but the weirdness has a stilted quality. This feels like a story with its heart chopped out."
