= Imam Turki bin Abdullah Grand Mosque =

Grand mosque in Riyadh, Saudi Arabia

- Arabic: جامع الإمام تركي بن عبد الله
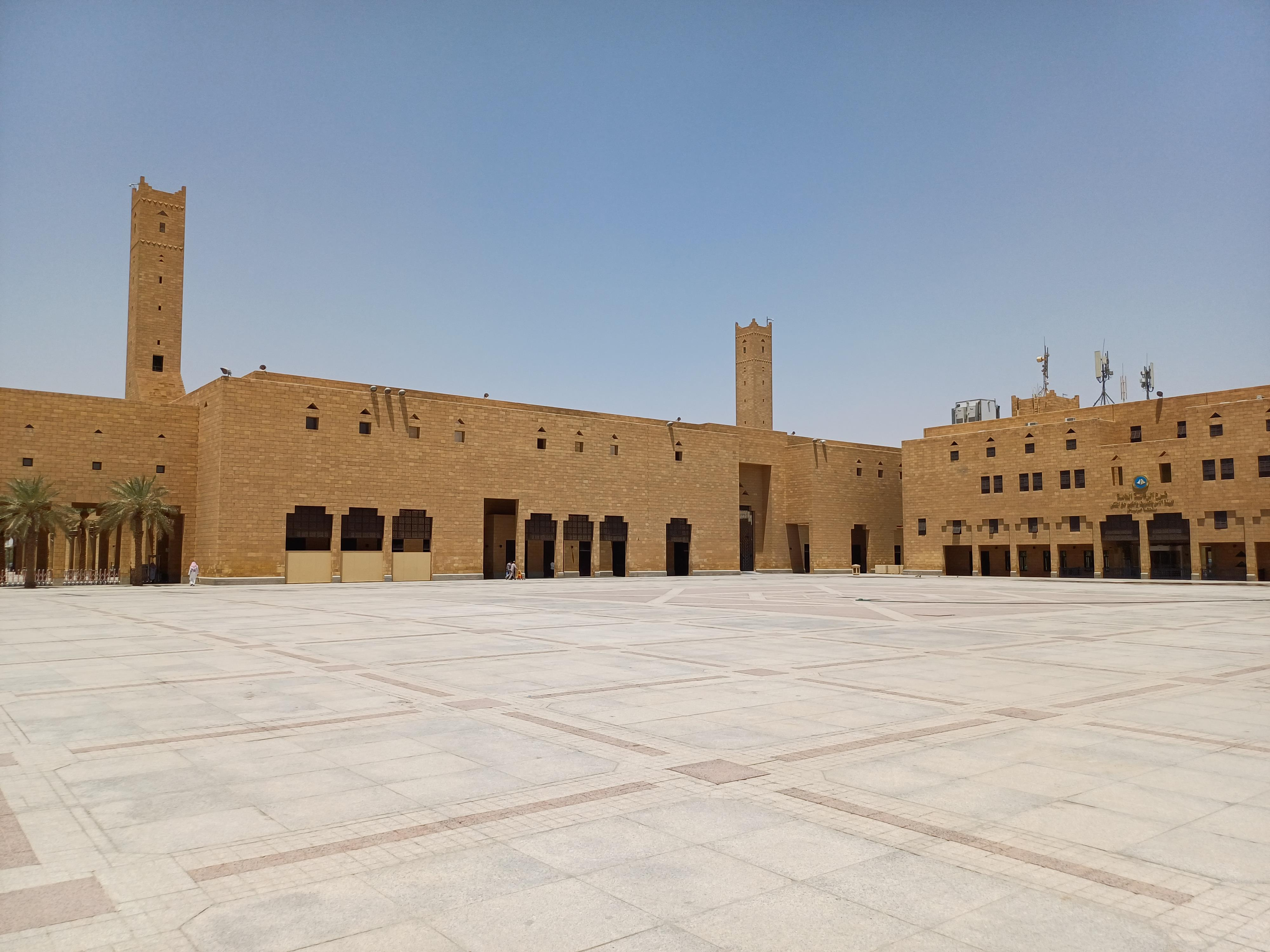
- The mosque in Deera Square, in 2024

- Location of the mosque in Saudi Arabia

Religion
- Affiliation: Sunni Islam
- Ecclesiastical or organizational status: Friday mosque
- Status: Active

Location
- Location: Deera Square, ad-Dirah, Riyadh
- Country: Saudi Arabia
- Interactive map of Imam Turki bin Abdullah Grand Mosque
- Coordinates: 24°37′50.6″N 46°42′38.9″E

Architecture
- Architect: Rasem Badran
- Type: Mosque architecture
- Style: Modern Najdi (1992)
- Founder: Turki bin Abdullah Al Saud
- Funded by: Arriyadh Development Authority (1992)
- Groundbreaking: 1826 (original structure)
- Completed: 1830 (original structure); 1992 (restored structure)

Specifications
- Capacity: 17,000 worshippers
- Interior area: 16,800 m^{2} (181,000 sq ft)
- Minaret: Two
- Materials: Arriyadh Limestone; marble

The Imam Turki bin Abdullah Grand Mosque (Arabic: جامع الإمام تركي بن عبد الله), also known as the Grand Mosque of Riyadh, is a Sunni Islam Friday mosque in the ad-Dirah neighborhood of Riyadh, Saudi Arabia, located adjacent to al-Hukm Palace compound, in Deera Square.

It was established in the period c. 1830, during the reign of Turki bin Abdullah Al Saud. The mosque was rebuilt in 1992 in Modern Najdi architectural style. Seating 17,000 worshippers and measuring 16,800 square metres (181,000 sq ft), it is one of the largest mosques in Saudi Arabia.

The exterior and upper portion of the interior is primarily brown Arriyadh Limestone which appears golden when lit up at night. The lower portion of the interior is in white marble. The structure includes separate men's and women's libraries, each 325 square metres (3,500 sq ft).

The mosque is directly connected from the first floor to al-Hukm Palace via two bridges across as-Safaat Square.

== History ==
The mosque was rebuilt in 1992 on the site of a previous grand mosque, that was built sometime between 1826 and 1830 during the reign of Turki bin Abdullah bin Muhammad al-Saud.

A Grand Mosque existed on the site for decades but was rebuilt by the Arriyadh Development Authority and reopened in January 1993.

== Architecture ==
Designed by Rasem Badran in the Modern Najdi style, the mosque was a recipient of the Aga Khan Award for Architecture in 1995.

The minarets of the mosque previously featured a mix of Ottoman and Egyptian styles, with two rectangular sections topped by three rounded sections and a top section coming to a point with round shapes atop it. The courtyard porticos rose in a triangular with decor above. The minarets were however rebuilt in rectangular neo-Najdi style, the courtyard completely resurfaced and the porticos are now a modernized version of their former shape.

== See also ==
- Islam in Saudi Arabia
- List of mosques in Saudi Arabia
