= Ushaiger =

Ushaiqer أشيقر
- Village
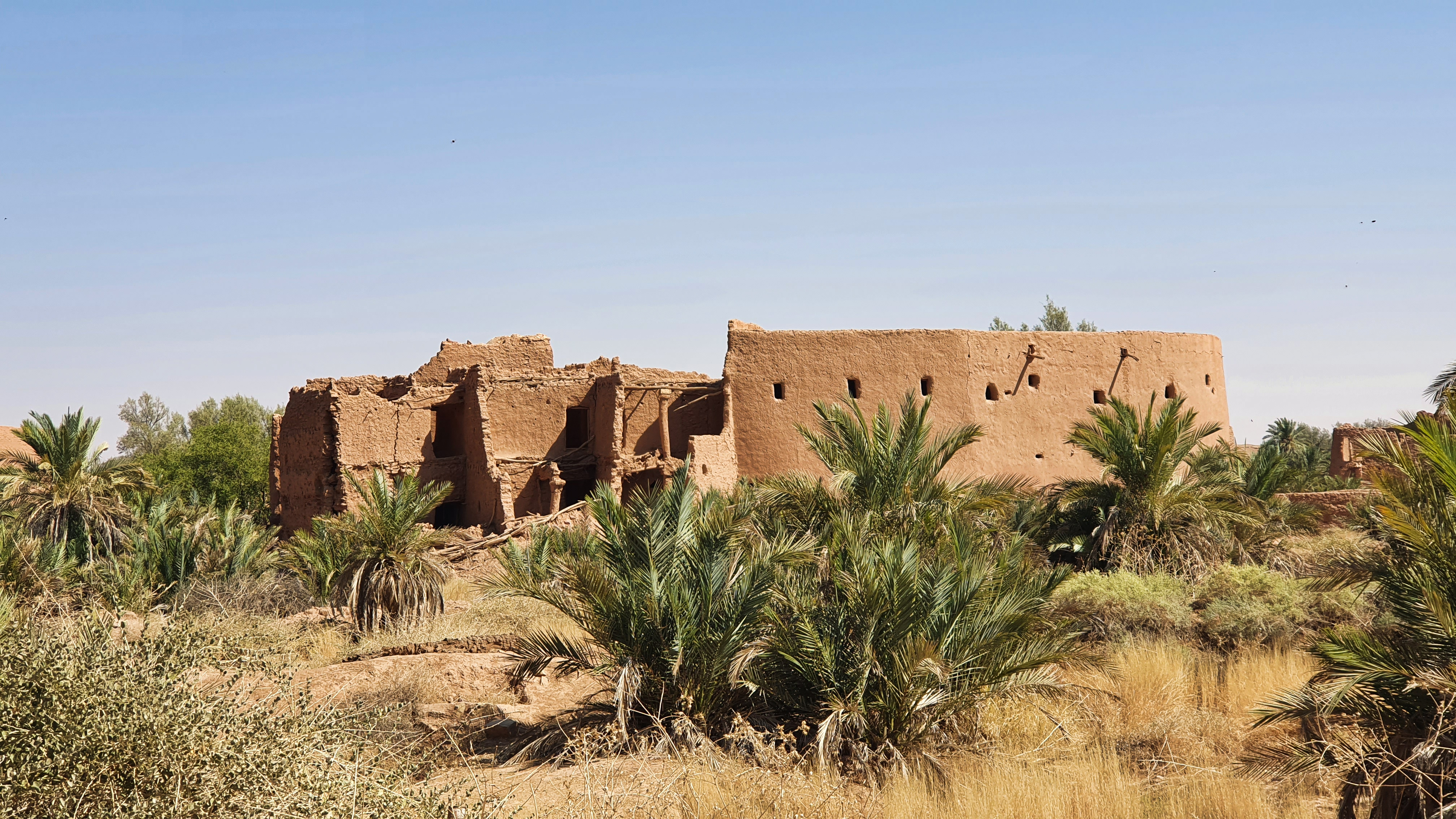

- Location within Saudi Arabia
- Coordinates: 25°20′33″N 45°11′0″E
- Country: Saudi Arabia
- Emirate: Riyadh Province
- Time zone: UTC+3 (EAT)

Ushaiqer (Arabic: أشيقر) is a small village near Shaqra in Saudi Arabia. It is 200 km (120 mi) north-west of Riyadh.

Ushaiqer is one of the oldest towns in the Saudi region of Najd and it was a major stopping point for pilgrims coming from Kuwait, Iraq and Iran to perform Hajj or Umrah. It was originally known as A'ekel but the name was eventually changed to Ushaiqer. It was changed because the town is bordered by a small mountain north of the village. The mountain is red in color, yet locals said it was blonde simply because red and blonde were used interchangeably in the old days. Ushaiqer means the "Small Blonde", which is a description of that particular mountain.

Historical Ushaiqer belongs to the Tamim tribe although other tribes lived there as well. It is also the home land to many families in the Arabian Peninsula. The known families are Al-Hussaini (one of leaders on Ushaiqer in old times), Abahussein (the Imams of the Northern Mosque), Al-Elsheikh (The family of Muhammad ibn Abd-al-Wahhab), Al-Thani (rulers of the state of Qatar) and & Al-Bassam etc.

The historical importance of the village is that its old mud buildings are still untouched. Therefore, it is considered one of the most attractive historical areas in the region.

Lately, the people of Ushaiqer had restored the historical village to preserve its heritage and built a museum which displays various relics and pieces from the village.

== See also ==
- List of cities and towns in Saudi Arabia
- Regions of Saudi Arabia
- Faylaqia Mosque
