= Qasr Al-Hukm =

Cultural heritage landmark in Riyadh, Saudi Arabia

Al-Hukm Palace
- قصر الحكم (Arabic)
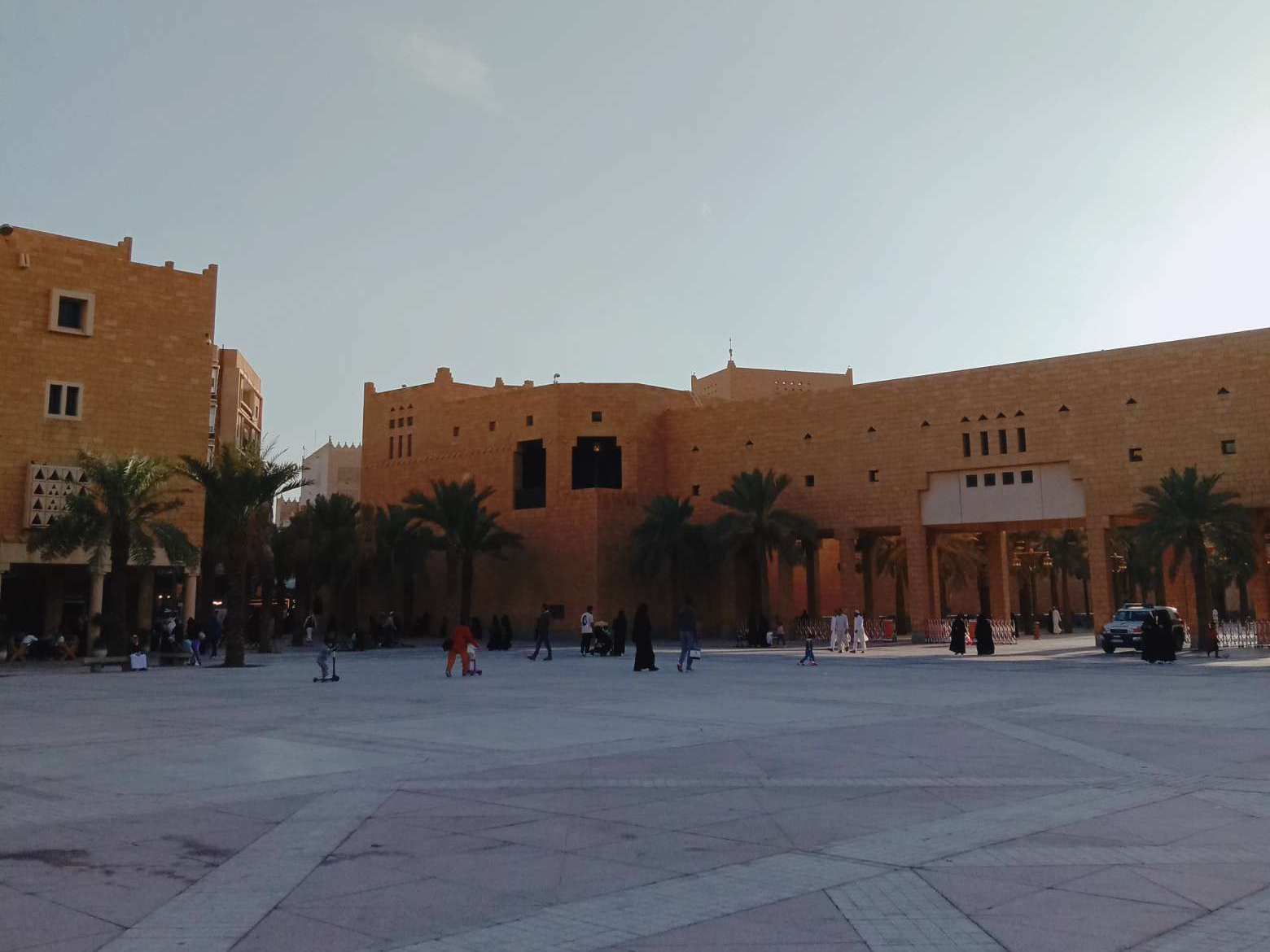
- Al Hukm Palace as viewed from Deera Square in 2022, connected to one of the two covered passageways that link the palace with Imam Turki bin Abdullah Mosque
- Interactive map of Al-Hukm Palace
- 24°37′48″N 46°42′39″E
- Location: Riyadh, Saudi Arabia

History
- Built: 1747; 279 years ago
- Built for: Dahham ibn Dawwas
- Rebuilt: 1824; 1912; 1992

Site notes
- Area: 11,500 square metres (1.15 ha)
- Restored by: Turki bin Abdullah (1824); Abdulaziz ibn Saud (1912); Salman bin Abdulaziz (1992)

Al-Hukm Palace (Arabic: قصر الحكم, romanized: Qaṣr al-Ḥukm, lit. 'Governance Palace') or The Ruling Palace, originally Ibn Dawwas Palace, and also known as the al-ʽAdl Palace (Arabic: قصر العدل, romanized: Qaṣr al-ʿAdl, lit. 'Justice Palace'), so called from the public square it overlooks from the south, is a historic palace and a popular cultural heritage landmark in the ad-Dirah neighbourhood of Riyadh, Saudi Arabia, located directly opposite to Imam Turki bin Abdullah Grand Mosque in the Qasr al-Hukm District. It is the historic site where tribal leaders and members of the Saudi royal family have been pledging allegiance to the country's political leadership. It was built in 1747 by Dahham ibn Dawwas alongside the city wall to safeguard the walled town from invaders and intruders. In the 1820s, Turki bin Abdullah, after gaining control of Najd, shifted the royal family's center of power from Diriyah to the walled town of Riyadh due to the former's severe destruction in a brutal siege during the Ottoman–Wahhabi War of 1818 as well as the town’s Ottoman sacking in 1821.

Once the administrative headquarters of the fortress-city within the erstwhile walls, it was built by Daham bin Dawwas in 1747 and is the oldest structure in Riyadh that was razed and rebuilt on numerous occasions over the course of time. It was also the official residences of several royals of the first and second Saudi states and today serves as the main office of the governor of Riyadh.

== History ==
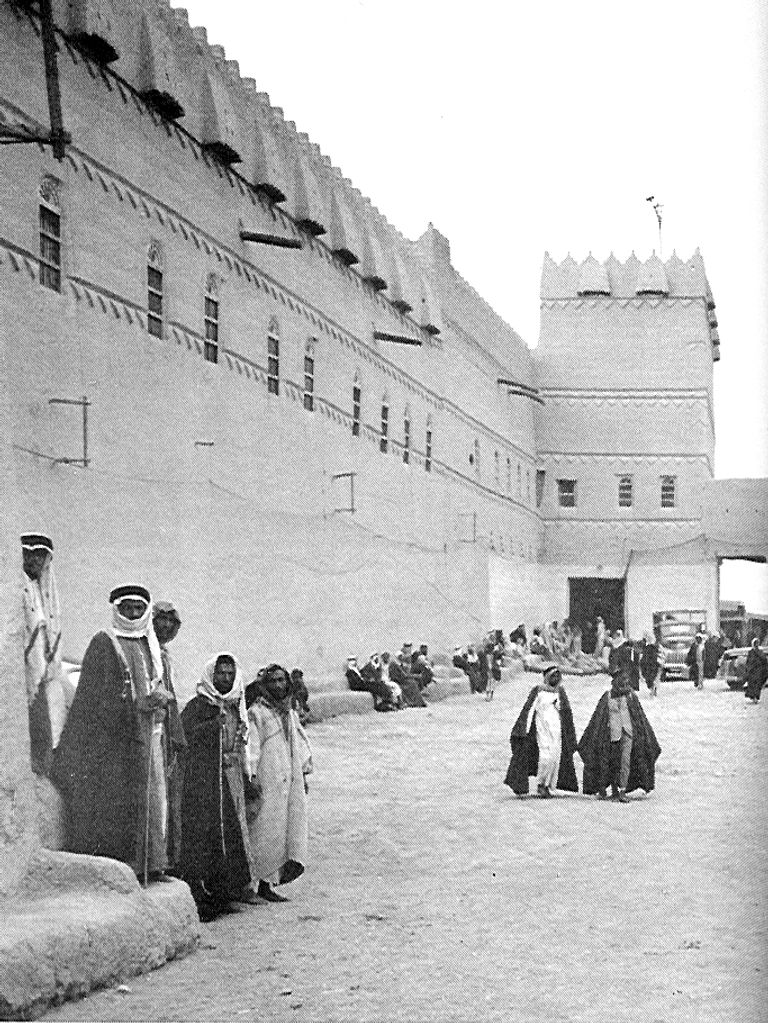
Al-Hukm Palace, 1943

=== Establishment and the First Saudi State ===
Qasr al-Hukm traces its origins to the reign of Deham bin Dawas al-Shalaan in 1747, the-then ruler of Riyadh oasis who built a fortified palace for himself. He abandoned the palace and fled Riyadh for Bani Khalid-ruled al-Hasa when Muhammad ibn Saud's forces advanced towards the city in 1773.

=== During Second Saudi State ===
Following the defeat of the First Saudi State in the aftermath of the Ottoman–Wahhabi war in 1818, the palace was inhabited by Mishari bin Muhammad bin Muammar, who ruled as Riyadh's emir under the Ottoman-backed Egyptian tutelage until 1824, when Turki bin Abdullah al-Saud recaptured the city and rebuilt the palace after reinstating the Second Saudi State.

As Diriyah was dilapidated by the Egyptian forces in 1818, as a result, Qasr al-Hukm was eventually made the new center of power for the House of Saud by Turki bin Abdullah. In 1834, Turki was assassinated by his cousin Mishari bin Abdul Rahman as he was leaving the Great Mosque after Friday prayers. Mishari had subsequently proclaimed himself the new Imam of the Saudi state. Turki's son, Faisal bin Turki, upon being informed of his tragedy, rushed back towards Riyadh in order to avenge his father's assassination whilst abandoning his campaign against Bahrain.

Upon reaching Riyadh, he had found Mishari hiding inside the palace and laid siege to it. Faisal subsequently killed Mishari and succeeded him as the new Imam.

By the 1880s, the Haʼil-based Rashidi Emirate took-over Riyadh and deposed the House of Saud, bringing the Second Saudi State to a close in 1891 after the Battle of Mulayda and exiling its last leader, Abdul Rahman al-Saud and his family to Kuwait. The Rashidi leader, Muhammad bin Abdullah Al Rashid went on to destroy much of the palace in around 1889 in order to efface the legacy of the Saudis.

=== Third Saudi State and today ===
In 1901, the deposed leader's son, Ibn Saud embarked on a raiding spree into Nejd in order to avenge his father's deposition. By January 1902, he retook Riyadh in a battle and pushed the Rashidis back to their ancestral homeland of Ha'il. He lived in the house of late Princess Nourah bint Faisal bin Turki al-Saud, the daughter of Imam Faisal bin Turki for almost ten years until 1912, when the reconstruction of Qasr al-Hukm was completed. Electricity was introduced in the palace in 1931. It was his residence until 1938, when he moved to al-Murabba Palace. However, the palace continued to exercise administrative duties until his death in 1953.

The palace and its surrounding area gradually declined in importance when King Saud bin Abdulaziz accelerated the expansion and modernization of Riyadh following his ascension to the throne in the 1950s, whereby he began constructing new neighborhoods in the city's north such as al-Malazz and al-Nasiriyah.

In 1964, members of the royal family pledge allegiance to the new monarch of Saudi Arabia, Faisal bin Abdulaziz. In 1975, members of the royal family and tribal leaders pledged allegiance to King Khalid bin Abdulaziz and Crown Prince Fahd bin Abdulaziz.

In 1976, The High Commission for the Development of Arriyadh commissioned the Qasr Al-Hukm District Development Project and agreed on developmental programs that were prepared to transform the Qasr al-Hukm District into a cultural center. The designs were completed by 1979 and the construction lasted between 1983 and 1992 in broadly two phases, costing around US$500 million. The project was overseen by Prince Salman bin Abdulaziz al-Saud, the-then governor of Riyadh.

=== Phase 1 (1983–1988) ===
The first phase lasted between 1983 and 1988, in which the main offices of the Riyadh's governor, mayor and the regular police were constructed in the palace.

=== Phase 2 (1988–1992) ===
The second phase lasted between 1988 and 1992, where the Imam Turki bin Abdullah Mosque, Al-Hukm Palace, Al-Adl Plaza, Assafah Plaza, Imam Muhammad bin Saud Plaza, Al-Musmak Plaza, Al-Thumairi Gate, and Dekhna Gate, Ad-Deerah Tower were restored and built.

=== Phase 3 (since 1992) ===
The third phase focused on winning confidence of the country's private sector. Headquarters of some institutions were constructed like the High Court, Civil Defense, Sheikh Muhammad bin Ibrahim Al Alsheikh Mosque, Dekhna Plaza, al-Zal Souq, and modern seven commercial complexes.

== In modern times ==
In 2014, the Riyadh Metro project was commenced and several sites were selected and designated for the construction of metro stations. One of the sites selected in al-Qiri was named after the palace, the Qasr Al-Hukm metro station.

Following the death of King Abdullah in January 2015, members of the House of Saud pledged allegiance to the new monarch, Salman in the precincts of Qasr al-Hukm. In September 2015, the Saudi government opened the palace to the general public for the first time, with a free exhibition celebrating the unusual coincidence of the Saudi National Day and Eid al-Adha.

In April 2021, the Saudi Central Bank issued a SAR 200 note to commemorate the 5th anniversary of Saudi Vision 2030. The obverse side featured an image of King Abdulaziz while the reverse side depicted the entrance of al-Hukm Palace.

== In popular culture ==
The palace was shown as the building of a fictitious Saudi immigration court in the 2023 Indian Hindi-language comedy drama film Dunki.
