= Riyadh Governorate =

Riyadh Governorate محافظة الرياض
- Governorate
- Location of Riyadh Governorate in Riyadh Province

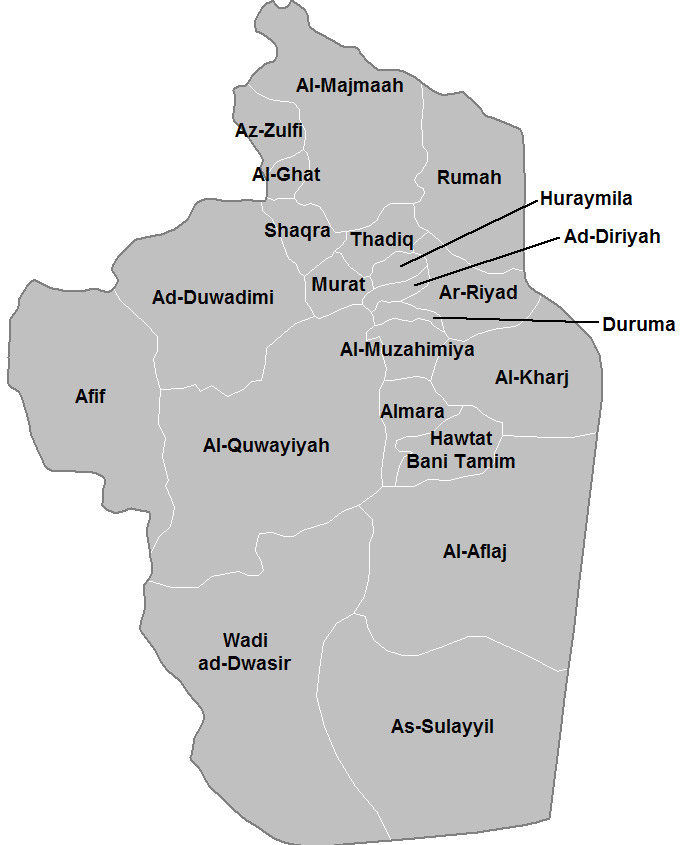

- Location in Saudi Arabia
- Coordinates: 24°41′47″N 46°46′43″E
- Country: Saudi Arabia
- Province: Riyadh Province
- Seat: Riyadh
- Cities and towns: Riyadh; Irqah; Hayir; Hayyat; Banban; Amajiyah

Population (2021)
  - Total: 7,009,100
- Time zone: UTC+3 (AST)
  - Summer (DST): UTC+3 (AST)

Riyadh Governorate (Arabic: محافظة الرياض) is one of the 22 governorates (muhafzah) of Riyadh Province that contains the city of Riyadh, capital of Saudi Arabia alongside five other towns and neighborhoods. It shares borders with the Rumah governorate to the north, al-Kharj governorate to the south, Huraymila, Thadiq, Diriyah and Durumah governorates to the west and Eastern Province's Al-Ahsa governorate to the east.

== Administrative divisions ==
- Riyadh (seat)
- Irqah
- Hayir
- Heet
- Banban
- Amajiyah
