= Downtown Riyadh =

Downtown Riyadh وسط الرياض
- Neighborhood
- Interactive map of Downtown Riyadh
- Coordinates: 24.64627°N 46.71524°E
- Country: Saudi Arabia
- City: Riyadh
- Baladiyah: Al-Batʼha; Al-Malaz; Al-Shumaisi
- Downtown Development Plan: 2013
- Neighborhoods of Downtown: Neighborhoods list: Al Oud; Al Salihiyah; Ghubaira; Margab; Thulaim; Al Amal; Al Shumaisi; Umm Sulaim; Al Wisham; Al Murabba; Al Fouta; Al Dirah; Al Doho; Al Qiri; Gabrah; Al Bateha; Al Wusaita; Miʼkal; Al Dubiyah; Al Salam

Downtown Riyadh (Arabic: وسط الرياض, lit. 'middle Riyadh') is a term used for a group of 20 neighborhoods in Riyadh, Saudi Arabia. Covering an area of more than 3700 acres, it hosts some of the city's most important cultural and commercial districts, such as the King Abdulaziz Historical Center, the al-Batʼha commercial area and the Qasr al-Hukm District, while simultaneously overlapping with many of the old city areas of the capital metropolis, including the erstwhile walled town. The first downtown development plan was introduced in 2013 by the Royal Commission for Riyadh City.

The downtown is bounded by Al-Washm Street and Omar bin Al-Khattab Street in the north, Al-Kharj Road in the east, Ammar bin Yasir Street and Al-A’sha Street in the south, and Imam Abdulaziz bin Muhammad Street in the west.

== Districts ==
=== Qasr al-Hukm District ===
Qasr al-Hukm District is a term used to define the perimeters of the erstwhile walled town of Riyadh in present-day districts of ad-Dirah and ad-Daho, encompassing several extinct quarters and douars that once fell within the enclosure of the gates of old city walls prior to its demolition in 1950. Named after the eponymous al-Hukm Palace, it is widely considered to be the antecedent to modern Riyadh since the metropolis outgrew as an offshoot of the walled town in the 1950s. Owing to its historical and architectural significance, it was rebuilt by the Saudi government between 1970s and 1990s and is situated southwest of al-Batʼha commercial area.

==== Deera Square ====
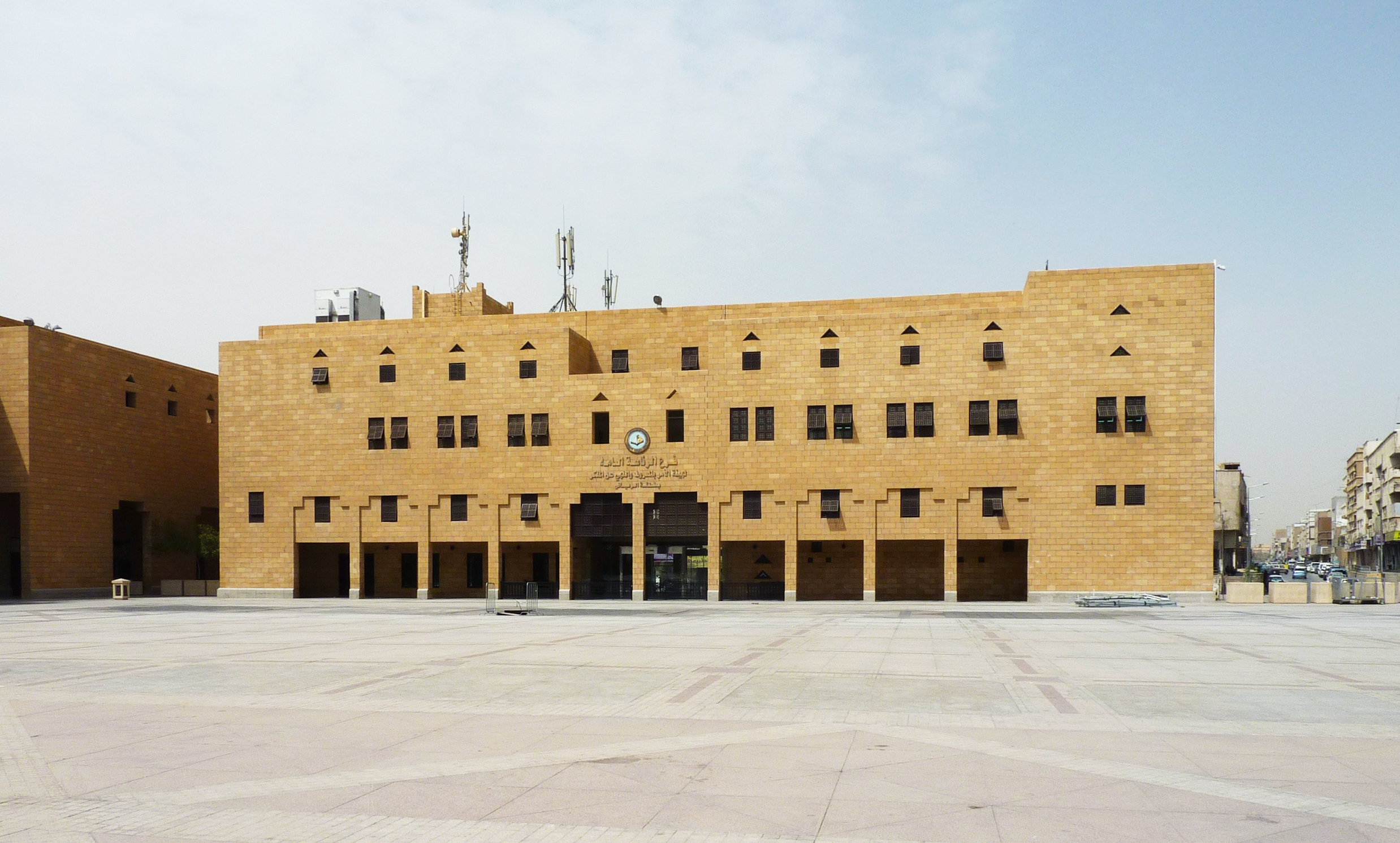
Deera Square, 2011

Deera Square is a public space in the ad-Dirah neighborhood of Riyadh, Saudi Arabia, located adjacent to the al-Hukm Palace compound and Imam Turki bin Abdullah Grand Mosque in the Qasr al-Hukm District. It is known as the historic site of public executions, where those sentenced to death in Saudi Arabia are publicly beheaded.

==== Al Hukm Palace ====
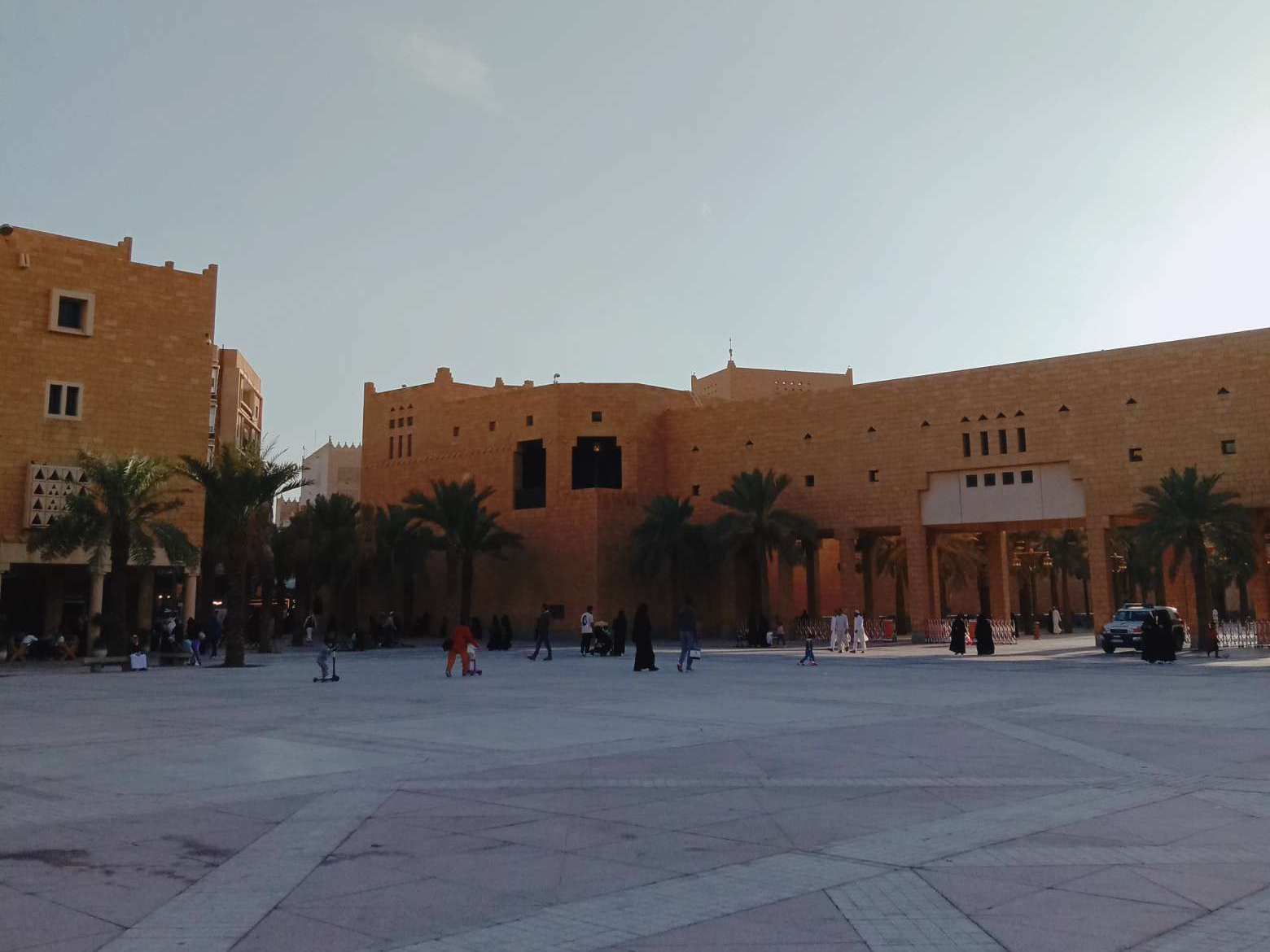
Al Hukm Palace, 2022

Al-Hukm Palace, so called from the public square it overlooks from the south, is a historic palace and a popular cultural heritage landmark in the ad-Dirah neighbourhood of Riyadh, Saudi Arabia, located directly opposite to Imam Turki bin Abdullah Grand Mosque in the Qasr al-Hukm District.

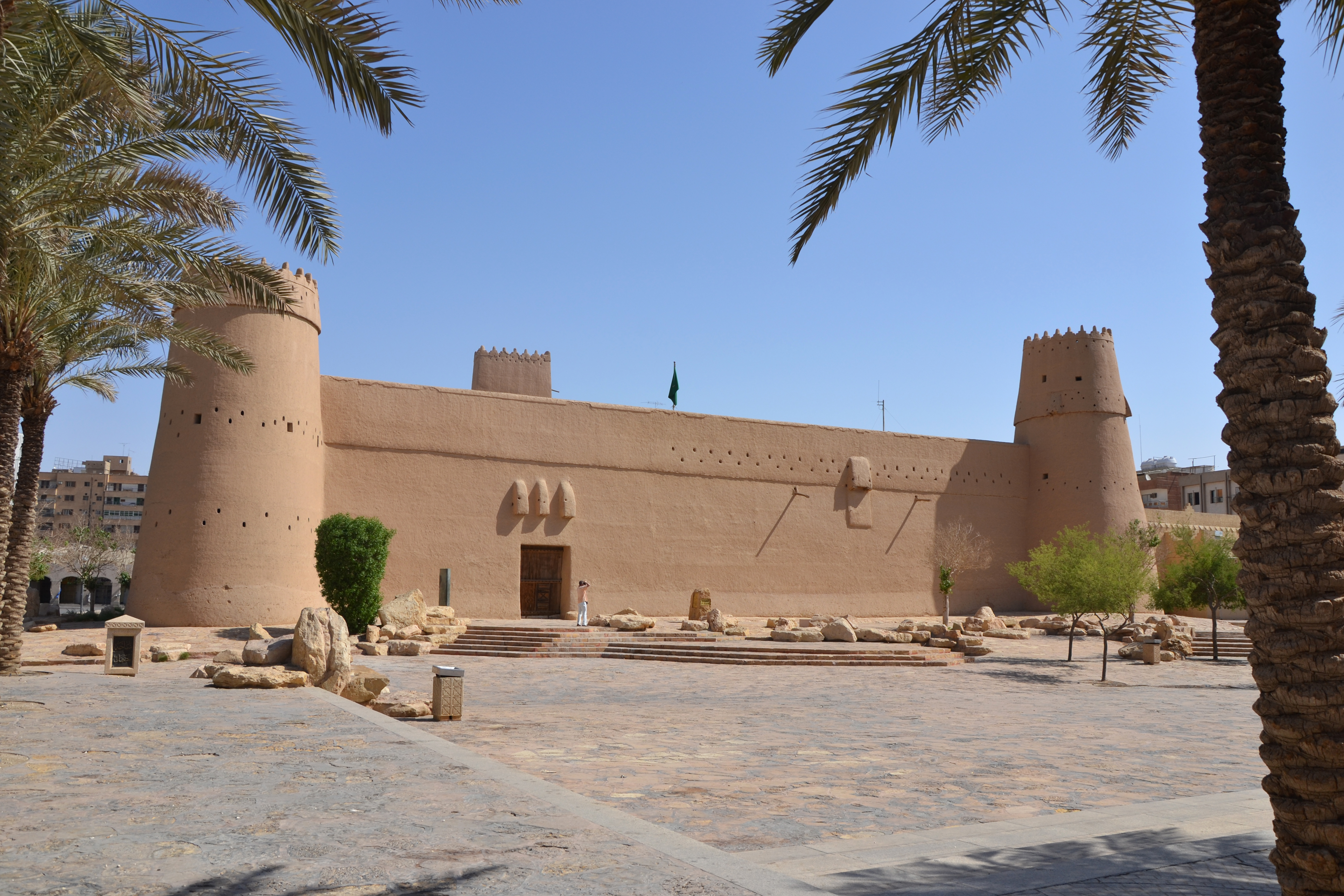
Masmak Fort, 2011

==== Masmak Fortress ====
Masmak Fort is a clay and mudbrick fort in the al-Dirah neighborhood of Riyadh, Saudi Arabia, located near the al-Hukm Palace in the Qasr al-Hukm District. It was the site of the Battle of Riyadh in 1902, that paved the way for the establishment of the Emirate of Riyadh, the first iteration of modern Saudi Arabia. The fortress was converted into a museum in 1995, showcasing one of the most important landmarks of Saudi heritage.

==== Imam Turki bin Abdullah Grand Mosque ====
Imam Turki bin Abdullah Grand Mosque is a congregational mosque in the ad-Dirah neighborhood of Riyadh, Saudi Arabia, located adjacent to Qasr al-Hukm while it overlooks the Deera Square. It was established during the reign of Turki bin Abdullah bin Muhammad al-Saud, the founder and Imam of the Second Saudi State and was later named after him. Seating 17,000 worshippers and measuring 16,800 m2, it is one of the largest mosques in Saudi Arabia.

=== King Abdulaziz Historical Center ===
King Abdulaziz Historical Center(KAHC) is a cross-district heritage complex in Riyadh, Saudi Arabia, covering south of al-Murabba and north of al-Futah. It includes the al-Murabba Palace, the National Museum, King Abdulaziz Foundation for Research and Archives, King Abdulaziz Public Library, King Abdulaziz Auditorium, Red Palace and Riyadh Water Tower besides six municipal parks and gardens, namely the National Museum Park, al-Watan Park, the Palm Oasis and al-Yamamah Park. It was inaugurated in January 1999 by King Fahd bin Abdulaziz to mark the centenary year of Ibn Saud'stakeover of Riyadh in 1902, that paved the way for the establishment of the Emirate of Riyadh, the first iteration of modern Saudi Arabia.

==== Al Murabba Palace ====
Al Murabba Palace is a palace museum in the al-Murabba district of Riyadh. It was built in 1938 and was one of the first buildings erected outside the walls of the old city and was the last workplace of King Abdulaziz ibn Saud until his death in 1953. It was renovated by the Saudi government and was later incorporated into the King Abdulaziz Historical Center in 1999.

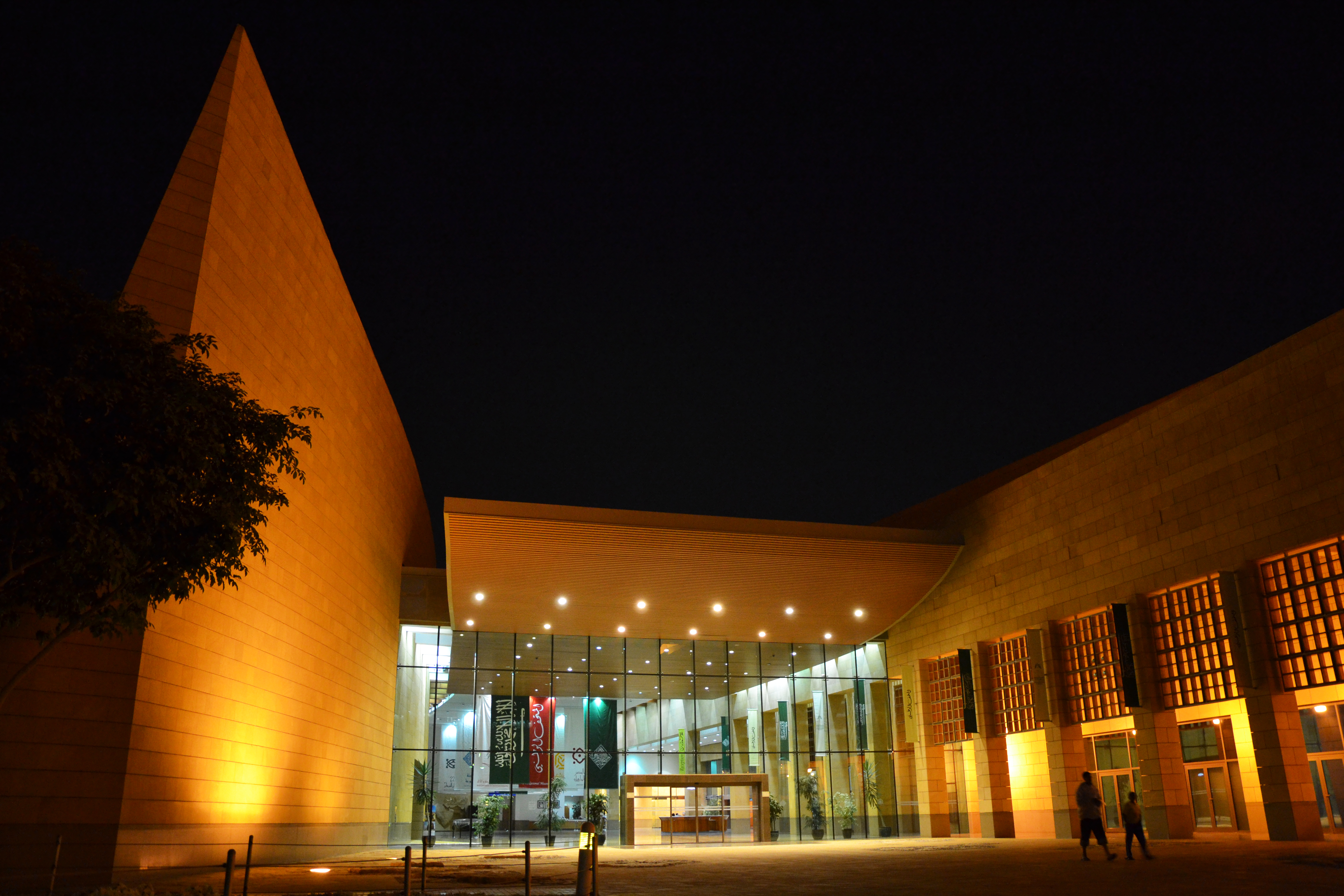
National Museum, 2012

==== National Museum of Saudi Arabia ====
National Museum of Saudi Arabia was inaugurated in 1999 as part of the King Abdulaziz Historical Center that exhibits several artifacts belonging to the First and Second Saudi States.

==== Al Hamra Palace ====
Al-Hamra Palace, or the Red Palace, was built in the 1940s by King Abdulaziz ibn Saud for his son, Saud bin Abdulaziz in the al-Fouta neighborhood of Riyadh. It was incorporated into the King Abdulaziz Historical Center in 1999, when it served as the headquarters of Saudi Board of Grievances. It was the first reinforced concrete structure in the history of Saudi Arabia and was opened to the general public in 2019.

==== Riyadh Water Tower ====
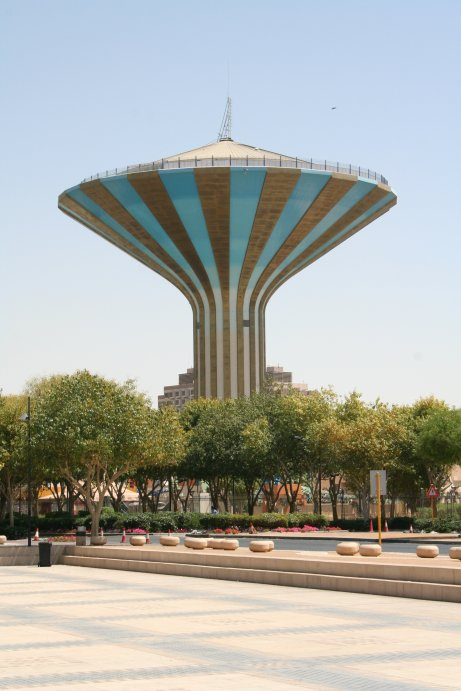
Riyadh Water Tower, 2007

Riyadh Water Tower is a 61-meters tall conical-shaped cylindrical water tower and a prominent cultural landmark in the al-Futah neighborhood of Riyadh, Saudi Arabia. Designed by Swedish architect Sune Lindström and modeled after the Svampen water tower in Örebro, Sweden, it was the tallest structure in the country at the time of its inauguration in 1971 and is today located within the precincts of al-Watan Park in the King Abdulaziz Historical Center.

==== National Museum Park ====
National Museum Park is an umbrella term used for the agglomeration of 5 out of 8 municipal parks and gardens in the al-Murabba neighborhood of Riyadh, Saudi Arabia, namely al-Haras, al-Soor, al-Wadi, al-Jisr and al-Madi that adjoin the Murabba Palace compound and the premises of National Museum as well as the King Abdulaziz Foundation for Research and Archives in northern section of the King Abdulaziz Historical Center.

=== Al-Batʼha commercial area ===
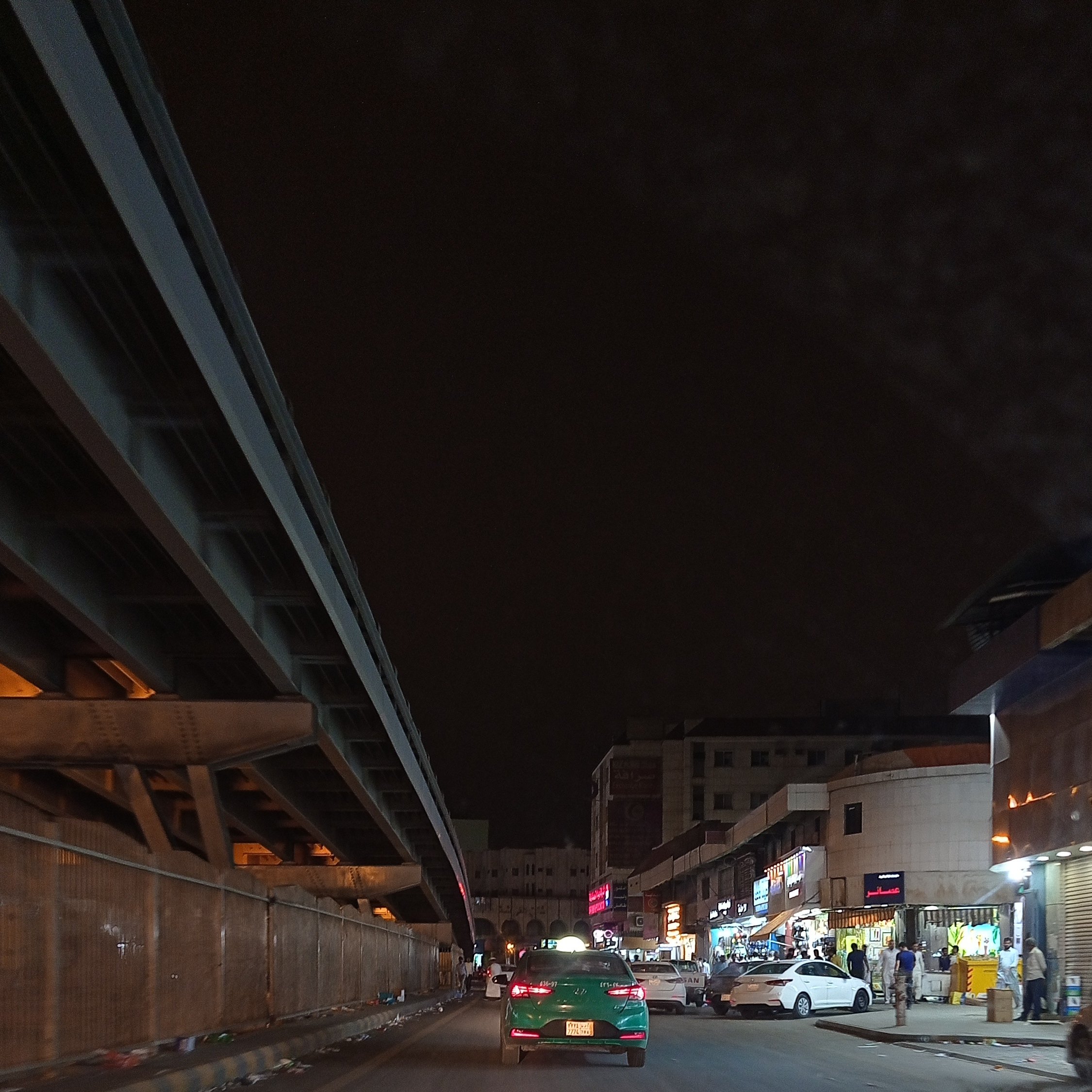
Al Batha, 2023

Al-Batʼha, also simply romanized as Batha, is a colloquial umbrella term used for the agglomeration of certain parts of neighborhoods in downtown Riyadh, Saudi Arabia, that are primarily situated along the al-Batʼha Street on the either edge of the now-dried up stream of Wadi al-Batʼha, located between al-Murabba and the Qasr al-Hukm District. It is one of the oldest commercial districts in Riyadh and the financial nerve center of the city's downtown area, covering east of al-Futah and al-Dirah whereas west of al-Amal, Margab and Thulaim. It emerged in the 1940s during World War II when a number of Kuwaiti merchants and traders chose to set up an auction market just outside the northeastern fringes of the city walls.

Besides being an open-air marketplace that hosts a number of large and medium-scale trading centers, the surrounding locality has been the heart of the city's Bangladeshi community since the oil boom of the 1970s, alongside Indians, Pakistanis, Filipinos and Sri Lankans, who altogether contribute in almost 70% of the economic activity in the area.
