= Dahham ibn Dawwas =

18th-century Arab politician and the founder of Riyadh

Dahham ibn Dawwas al-Shalaan
- دهام بن دواس الشعلان

Chieftain of Riyadh
- In office 1745 – 5 July 1773
- Preceded by: Ibn Zaid Abu Zara’ah
- Succeeded by: Abdulaziz ibn Muhammad (leader of the First Saudi State)

Regent for the House of Zaraʽah
- In office 1740–1745
- Monarch: Ibn Zaid Abu Zara’ah
- Preceded by: Khumayyis

Personal details
- Born: Late 17th century or early 18th century Manfuhah, Al-Yamama, Arabia (present-day Riyadh, Saudi Arabia)
- Died: Late 18th century Al-Hasa, Bani Khalid Emirate (present-day Eastern Province, Saudi Arabia)
- Parent: Dawwas ibn Abdullah (father)

Dahham ibn Dawwas ibn Abdullah al-Shalaan (Arabic: دهام بن دواس بن عبد الله الشعلان, romanized: Dahām bin Dawwās bin ʿAbd Allāh āl-Šaʿlān) was an 18th-century Arab tribal and political leader from Manfuhah who reigned as the first ruler of the walled town of Riyadh, initially as a regent for the House of Zara’ah between 1740 and 1745 and later as an independent chieftain from 1745 until he was deposed in 1773. A member of the clan that belonged to the Mutayr tribe, he was the son of Dawwas ibn Abdullah, the ruler of Manfuhah and is widely credited with laying the foundations of Riyadh, the-present day capital of Saudi Arabia, by constructing a mudbrick palace and erecting a defensive wall to ward-off invaders and intruders. He was one of the earliest political and military opponents to the House of Saud and the nascent Wahhabi movement, resulting in a conflict with Diriyah that lasted for almost 27 years. His overall strategic failure and miscalculated decisions throughout the course of the conflict led to his eventual overthrow at the hands of the First Saudi State, making his name synonymous with acts of foolishness and ineptitude in the Najd.

During his reign over the walled town, the names Hajr and Migrin, which were previously used for the area, fell into disuse and the name Riyadh had begun to surface in the Najd, including for settlements such as Owd and Mi’kal.

He rose through the ranks of the Zaraʽah dynasty in the 1730s when Zaid ibn Musa got assassinated by his cousin. He was succeeded by his slave, Khumayyis, who acted as the regent of Zaid's son and made Dahham as his close aide. He fled the town for Manfuhah in 1740 in fear of an uprising. The power vacuum gave Dahham the opportunity to seize control of the town.

== Early life and career ==
Dahham was born to Dawwas ibn Abdullah al-Shalaan in early 18th century in Manfuhah. His father Dawwas ibn Abdullah ruled the Manfuhah from 1681 until his death in 1726. His name is translated to 'crusher'. His brother Muhammad ibn Abdullah reigned over Manfuhah before a tribal uprising killed him. A rival faction of his family led by his uncle Mansour bin Marawi al-Shatri took control of the town and subsequently exiled him and rest of his siblings to the town of Migrin, which was then ruled by the Zaraʽah dynasty led by Zaid ibn Musa.

Zaid eventually granted asylum to Dahham and his family and also had himself married to the sister of Dahham in order to strengthen their relations. When Zaid got killed by his cousin in 1737, his slave, Khumayyis, avenged the death of his master by murdering the assassin and subsequently taking control of the town as a regent of Ibn Zaid, the underaged heir apparent of Zaid ibn Musa. Although he promised a smooth transfer of power once the child reached the age of maturity, several loyalists of the Zar'ah clan saw his rule as illegitimate and as an attempt to cling on to power. Therefore, in 1740, Khumayyis, fearing an impending coup, fled from Migrin to the town of Manfuhah and later got assassinated. Dahham, who was working as a subordinate to Khumayyis, seized control of the town as a regent of Ibn Zaid in 1740. Like his predecessor, he also vowed transfer of power to Ibn Zaid once he reaches the age of maturity, however in 1745, Dahham banished the underaged son from the town and assumed absolute authority of the settlement. Fearing to share the same fate as Khumayyis, he began building a wall and a mudbrick palace in order to keep a potential uprising at bay.

Soon after seizing control of the town, the inhabitants of the town rose up against him and besieged him in his palace. He sought assistance from Muhammad ibn Saud, who then mobilized a unit led by his brother, Mishari, in support of Dahham, enabling the latter to successfully suppress the rebellion. However, Dahham and the Emirate of Diriyah found itself at loggerheads when the former tried to annex his ancestral hometown of Manfuhah in 1746, which was in alliance with Diriyah. This marked the start of long drawn out conflict between Riyadh and Diriyah that lasted until 1773 when Imam Abdulaziz ibn Muhammad conquered Riyadh and deposed Dahham. It was during this time period during his reign over the walled town, the names Hajr and Migrin, which were previously used for the area, fell into disuse and the name Riyadh had begun to surface in the Najd, including for settlements such as Owd and Mi’kal.

Following his overthrow, he and his family along with many of his supporters headed towards ad-Dilam and al-Kharj, which was then ruled by Zaid ibn Zamil. He then fled to Bani Khalid-ruled al-Ahsa where he is believed to have lived the last days of his life.

== Personal life ==
Dahham often resorted to harsh methods in order to maintain his control over his subjects. His rule was marked with aggression and tyranny by Arab historians and chroniclers from Najd, such as Ibn Ghannam, a thought also seconded by Arabists such as William Facey and John Philby. He has been described as a sadist and a peerless brute, who would sew the mouths of women, chop off the tongues of innocent inhabitants, break their teeth and slash flesh from their bodies and force them to eat it after being roasted.
