= Al Sohoom Mosque =

Former Sunni mosque in Riyadh, Saudi Arabia

Al-Sohoom Mosque
- Arabic: مسجد السهوم
- Location of the former mosque in Saudi Arabia

Religion
- Affiliation: Sunni Islam (former)
- Ecclesiastical or organisational status: Mosque (former)
- Status: Abandoned

Location
- Location: al-Yamamah, Riyadh
- Country: Saudi Arabia
- Coordinates: 24.58774°N 46.71918°E

Architecture
- Type: Mosque architecture
- Style: Najdi architecture
- Completed: c. 18th century – c. 19th century

Specifications
- Interior area: 49 m^{2} (530 sq ft)
- Materials: Clay, stone

Al-Sohoom Mosque (Arabic: مسجد السهوم) is an abandoned former low-contour historic Sunni Islam mosque, under rehabilitation, in the al-Yamamah neighborhood of Riyadh, Saudi Arabia.

Covering an area of 49 m^{2} (530 sq ft), the mosque dates from the 18th or 19th century when it was situated in the town of Manfuhah. It is built in the Najdi architectural style, using clay and stands on five natural stone pillars extracted from the Tuwaiq mountains.

The Saudi authorities began taking steps to protect the mosque in 2020 by halting all excavation activities around the site.

== See also ==
- Islam in Saudi Arabia
- List of mosques in Saudi Arabia
