= Al-Qiri =

Al-Qiri حي القري
- Neighbourhood
- Interactive map of Al-Qiri
- Coordinates: 24°37′41″N 46°42′56″E
- Country: Saudi Arabia
- City: Riyadh
- Region: Old Riyadh
- Named for: Al-Qiri Gate

Government
  - Body: Baladiyah Al Batha

Language
  - Official: Arabic

Al-Qiri (Arabic: القري, romanized: al-Qirī) or al-Jiri and al-Guraiy, is a subject of Baladiyah al-Batha and is one of the oldest neighborhoods of Riyadh, Saudi Arabia. It shares close proximity to al-Dirah and Jabrah neighborhoods. Originally an orchard, it is named after the al-Qiri Gate of the former city wall, south east of the erstwhile walled town.
