= Al Mansurah (Riyadh) =

Al-Mansurah المنصورة Khanshaleelah
- Neighbourhood
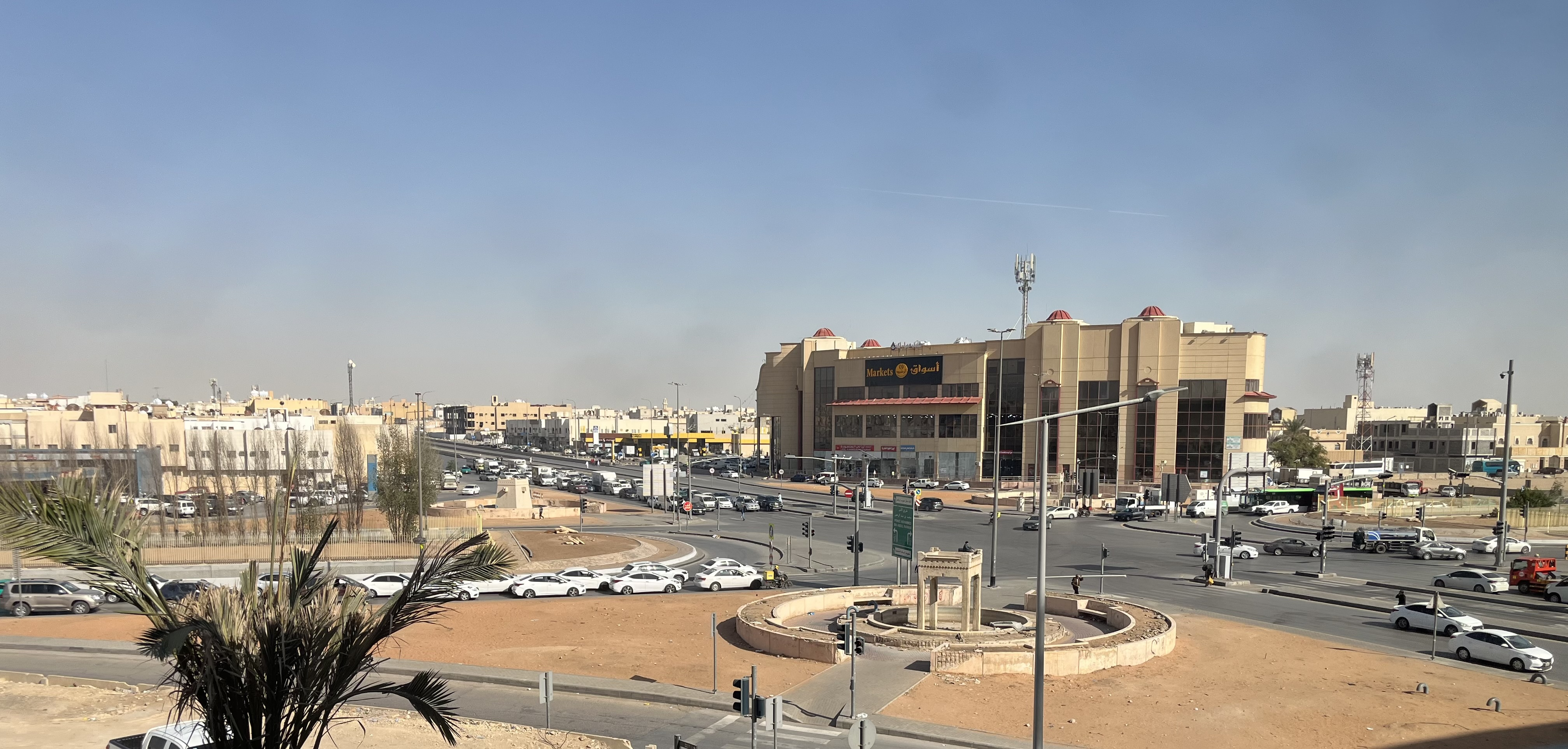
- Al Rasheed Markets in northwestern Mansurah, 2026
- Interactive map of Al-Mansurah
- Coordinates: 24°36′33″N 46°44′32″E
- Country: Saudi Arabia
- City: Riyadh

Government
  - Body: Baladiyah Al Batha; Baladiyah Al Aziziya

Area
  - Total: 5.89 km^{2} (2.27 sq mi)

Language
  - Official: Arabic

Al-Mansurah (Arabic: المنصورة), alternatively romanized as al-Mansourah and formerly known as Khanshaleelah, (Arabic: خنشليلة, lit. 'khan of Jaleelah') is a historic neighborhood in southern Riyadh, Saudi Arabia, located east of Manfuhah and west of al-Khalidiyyah in the sub-municipalities of al-Batʼha and Aziziya. It was once a stopover for Hajj pilgrims on the traditional route arriving from the east and was named after a 16th century local woman, Jaleelah bint Abdul Mohsen ad-Dar'iy, who had donated her house as a caravanserai to accommodate the travelers enroute to Mecca.

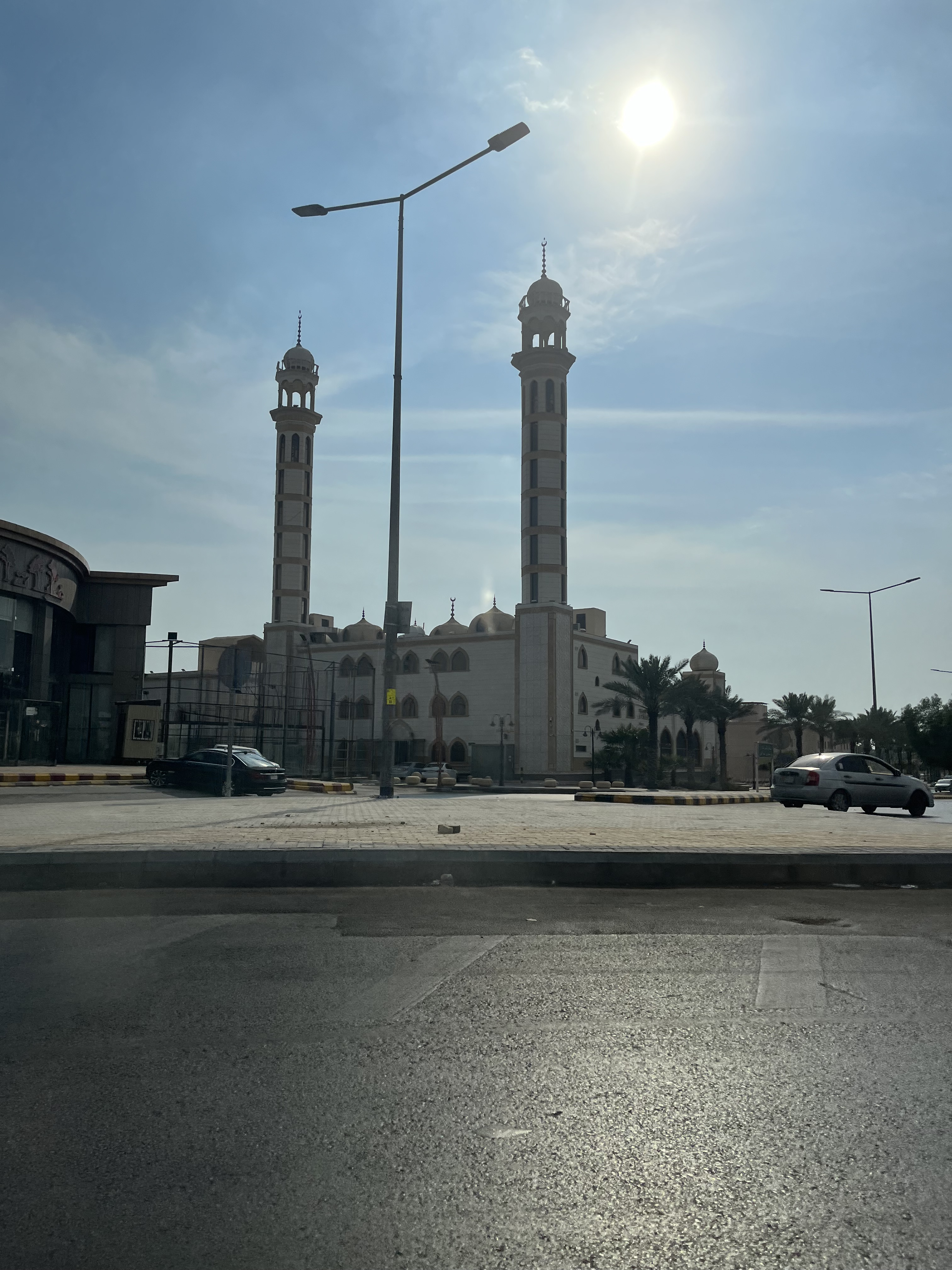
Sheikh Muhammad bin Abdulaziz al-Qassim Mosque, 2023

== History ==
According to historians, the neighborhood's previous name, Khanshaleelah was derived from the name of a woman, Jaleelah, the daughter of Abdul Mohsen bin Sai'id ad-Dar'iy al-Hanafyy, who reportedly donated her house to feed and accommodate Hajj pilgrims passing through Riyadh from east.

Pilgrims arriving from non-Arab eastern countries of Central Asia and Transoxiana dubbed the neighborhood as "khan", a Middle Persian word that refers to an "urban caravanserai" built within a town or a city.
