= Al Batʼha (Riyadh) =

One of oldest commercial areas in Riyadh, Saudi Arabia

Al-Batʼha البطحاء (Arabic) আল বাথা (Bengali) ബത്ത (Malayalam) Little Bangladesh
- Commercial district
- Al Batha Street on the side of al-Amal district, 2024
- Nickname: Hillat al-Kuwaitiyyah (formerly)
- Interactive map of Al-Batʼha
- Coordinates: 24.64627°N 46.71524°E
- Country: Saudi Arabia
- City: Riyadh
- Region: Old Riyadh
- Emerged: 1940s
- Named for: Wadi al-Batʼha
- Boroughs: List: Al-Amal (west) Thulaim (west) Margab (west) Al-Dirah (east) Al-Futah (east) Al-Oud (east)

Language
  - Official: Arabic
  - Spoken: Bangla, Hindi, Urdu, Filipino, Malayalam

Al-Batʼha (Arabic: البطحاء, romanized: al-Baṭʼḥāʾ, lit. 'the wide valley'), also simply romanized as Batha, is a colloquial umbrella term used for the partial agglomeration of six neighborhoods in downtown Riyadh, Saudi Arabia, that are primarily situated along the al-Batʼha Street on the either edge of the now-dried up stream of Wadi al-Batʼha, located between al-Murabba and the Qasr al-Hukm District. It is one of the oldest commercial districts in Riyadh and the financial nerve center of the city's downtown area, covering east of al-Futah and al-Dirah whereas west of al-Amal, Margab, Thulaim and to some extent, al-Oud. It emerged in the 1940s as Hillat al-Kuwaitiyyah (Arabic: الحلة الكويتية, lit. 'quarter of the Kuwaitis') during World War II when a number of Kuwaiti merchants and traders chose to set up an auction market just outside the northeastern fringes of the erstwhile walled town.

Besides being an open-air marketplace that hosts a number of large and medium-scale trading centers, the surrounding locality has been the heart of the city's Bangladeshi community since the oil boom of the 1970s, alongside Indians, Pakistanis, Filipinos and Sri Lankans, who altogether contribute in almost 70% of the economic activity in the area.

Traditional Kuwaiti goods accounted for majority of Batha's imports during the early days of its emergence, however, products from various countries like the United Kingdom, Spain, China, Taiwan, Switzerland, Vietnam and Thailand soon began increasing the diversity of Batha's trading centers.

Public transport services were introduced In the area in the 1960s. 1977, the Riyadh Municipality created the al-Batha Sub-Municipality, one of the 16 sub-municipalities of Riyadh, that also includes two of five neighborhoods that constitute the Batha area, namely ad-Dirah and Margab.

== Gallery ==
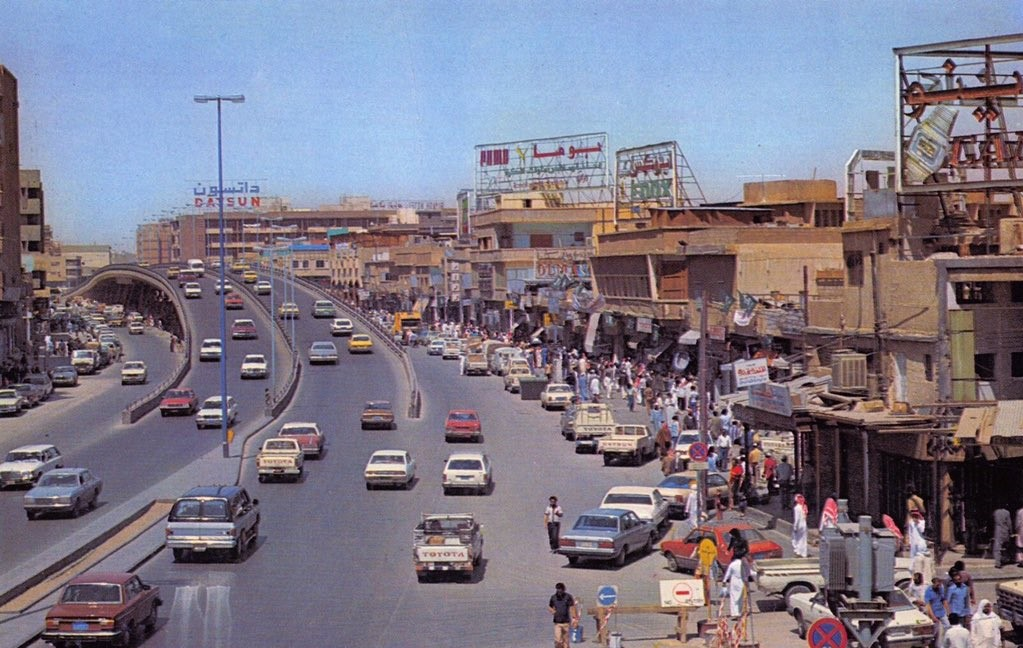
Al Batha Street, 1983

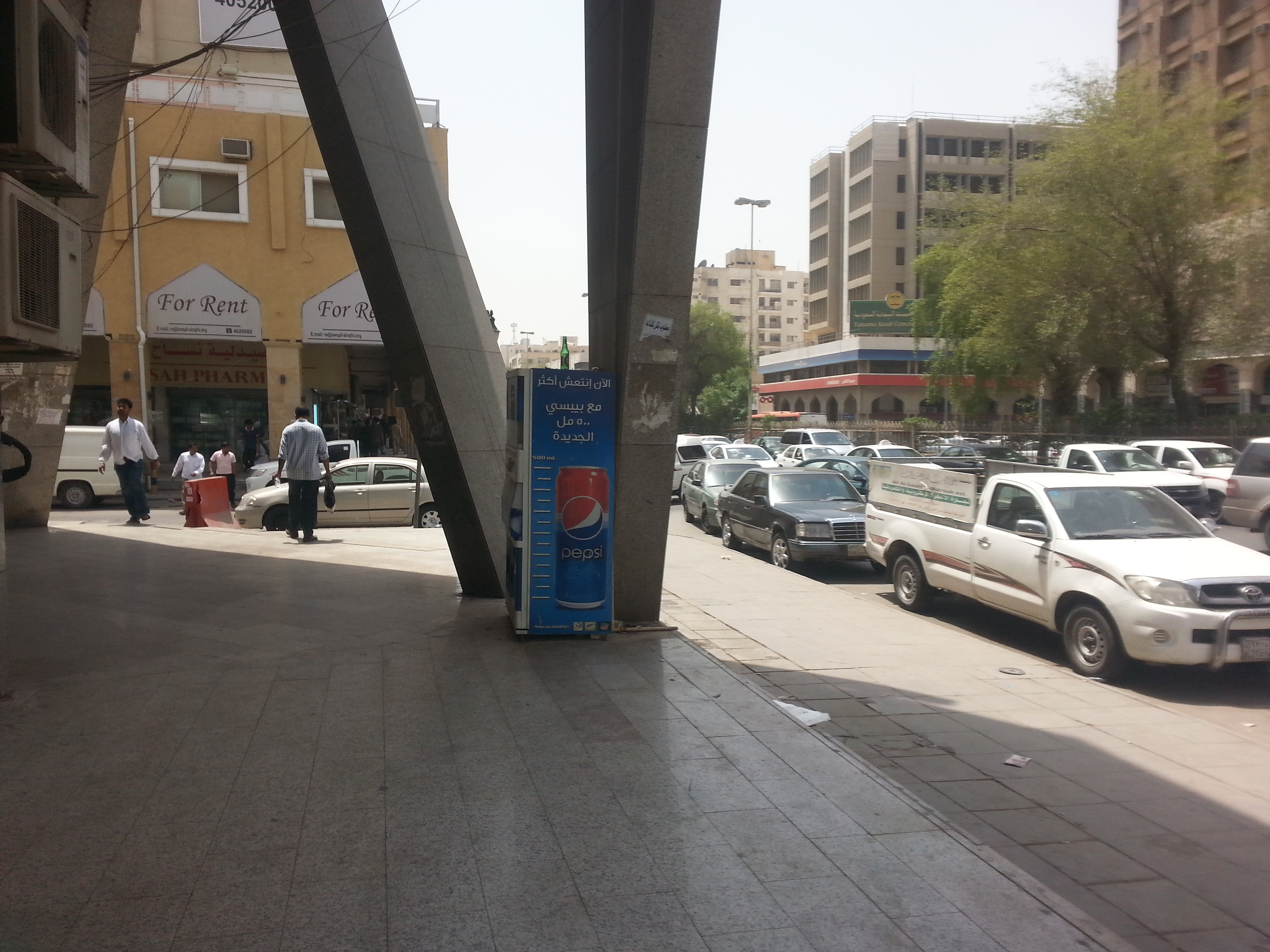
Bat’ha Street, 2014
