= Migrin =

Former settlement in present-day Riyadh, Saudi Arabia

Migrin (Arabic: بلدة مقرن) or Miqrin, also called Riyadh Muqrin was one of the major settlements in the southern outskirts of modern-day Riyadh, Saudi Arabia alongside Miʼkal that emerged from the ruins of Hajr al-Yamamah in the late 16th century. Forming a vital section of the Old Riyadh area, Miqrin constituted a large part of Riyadh's present-day neighborhoods of al-Dhahirah (ad- Dirah) and al-Shemaysi. A longtime rival to its neighbor Miʼkal, it was one of the most prosperous settlements in al-Yamama region, compared to ad-Diriyah, al-'Uyayna and al-Manfuhah. It was reportedly named after 16th century Arab Prince Muqrin ibn Zamil.
