= Al Bateha (Riyadh) =

Al-Bateha حي البطيحا
- Neighbourhood
- Location within Saudi Arabia Location within Asia
- Coordinates: 24.621867042704086°N 46.72013361360348°E
- Country: Saudi Arabia
- City: Riyadh

Government
  - Body: Baladiyah Al Batha

Language
  - Official: Arabic

Al-Bateha (Arabic: حي البطيحة) is a subject of Baladiyah al-Batha and one of the oldest neighborhoods in southern Riyadh, Saudi Arabia, located between Jabrah and Manfuhah al-Jadidah.
