= Umm Tina (well) =

Umm Tina (Arabic: أُمّ تِينَة, romanized: Umm Tīna, lit. 'mother of the fig tree'), also called Biʾir al-ʿUmrānī (Arabic: بِئر العُمرانِي), was among the most crucial and ancient wells in the former Migrin neighborhood of present-day Riyadh, Saudi Arabia. It was called Umm Tina because a huge fig-tree standing next to it. It was frequently mentioned in several poems and historical documents from 18th and 19th centuries.
