= Al Wusaita (Riyadh) =

Neighborhood in Riyadh, Saudi Arabia

Al-Wusaita (Arabic: حي الوسيطاء) is a subject of Baladiyah al-Batha and one of the oldest neighborhoods of the city in southern Riyadh, Saudi Arabia, inhabited mostly by overseas Asians. It shares proximity with Jabrah and Al Dirah neighborhoods.
