= Al Dubiyah (Riyadh) =

Al Dubiyah حي الدوبية
- Neighbourhood
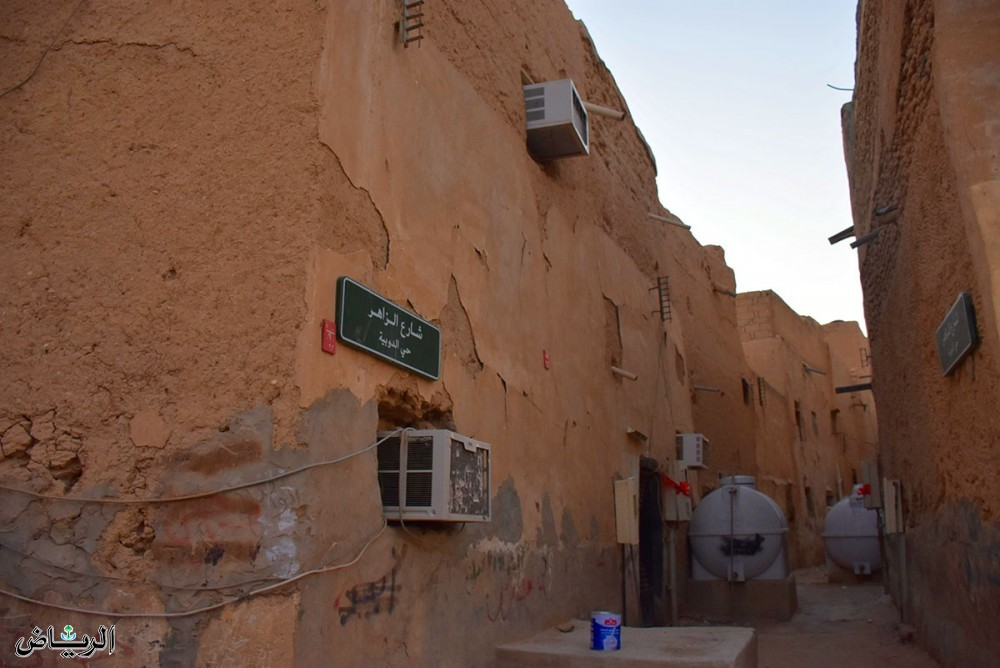

- Location within Saudi Arabia Location within Asia
- Coordinates: 24°37′18″N 46°42′44″E
- Country: Saudi Arabia
- City: Riyadh
- Region: Old Riyadh

Government
  - Body: Baladiyah Al Batha

Language
  - Official: Arabic

Al-Dubiyah (Arabic: حي الدوبية), pronounced as ad-Dubiyah, is a subject of Baladiyah al-Batha and one of the oldest neighborhoods of Riyadh, Saudi Arabia, located between Mikal and as-Salam. The area is known for its traditional mud-brick houses and derelict earth structured buildings.
