= Ghubaira =

Ghubaira حي غبيراء Ghubairah Arabic: حي الغبيرة
- Neighbourhood
- Ghubaira, 2023

- Location within Saudi Arabia
- Coordinates: 24°37′14″N 46°44′08″E
- Country: Saudi Arabia
- City: Riyadh
- Named for: Bani Ghubar

Government
  - Body: Baladiyah Al Batha

Language
  - Official: Arabic

Ghubaira (Arabic: حي غبيراء, romanized: ḥaī Ġubaīrāʾ), alternatively at times al-Ghubairah, (Arabic: حي الغبيرة, romanized: ḥaī Ġubaīrah) is a residential neighborhood in Riyadh, Saudi Arabia, located west of al-Khalidiyyah and south of al-Oud in the sub-municipality of al-Batha. It is named after the tribe of Bani Ghubar that once lived in the area and is inhabited mostly by overseas Afro-Arabs and Pakistanis.

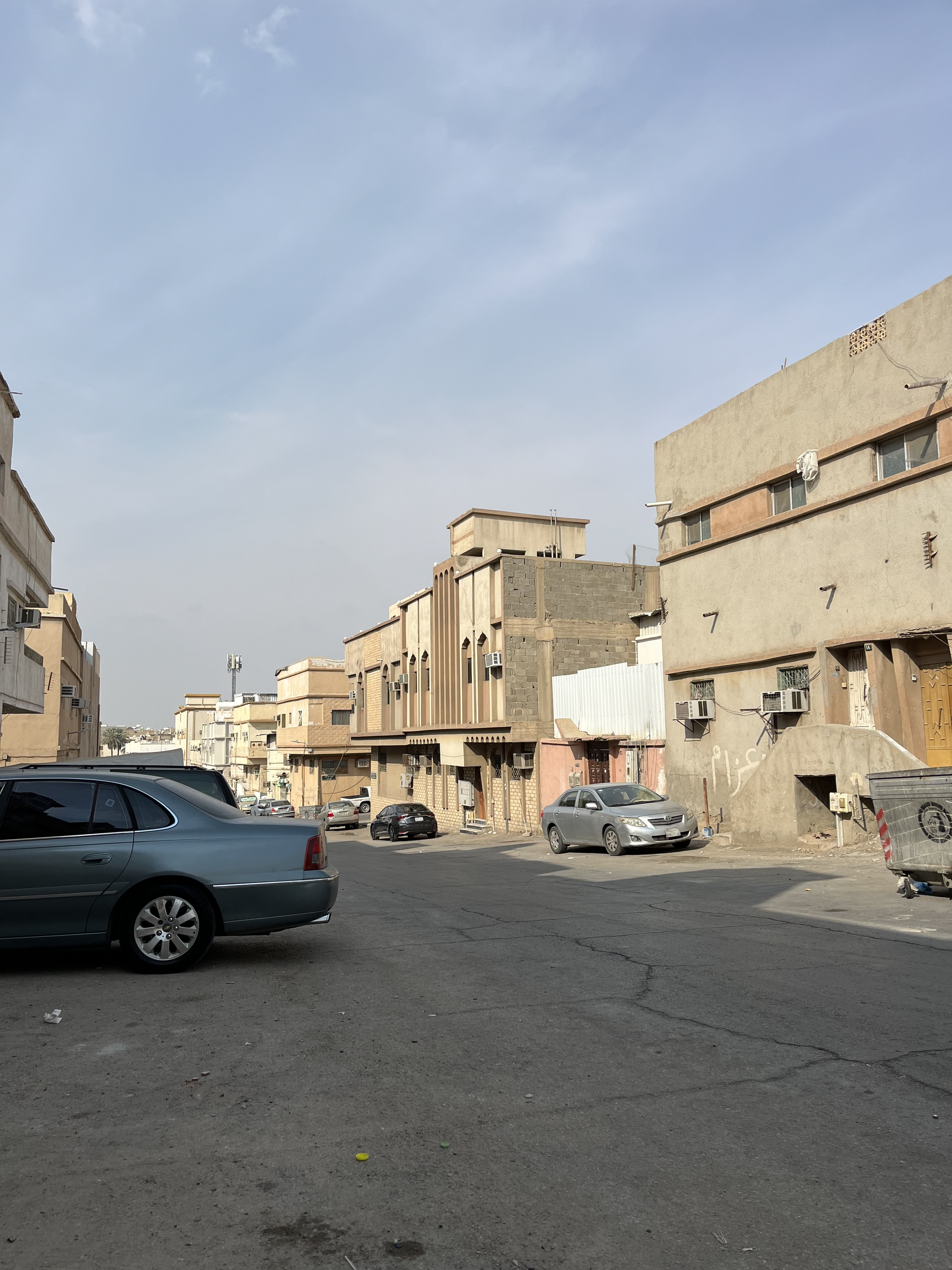
Ghubaira in November 2023
