= Utayqah =

Utayqah حي عتيقة
- Neighbourhood
- Country: Saudi Arabia
- City: Riyadh

Government
  - Body: Baladiyah Al Batha

Language
  - Official: Arabic

Utayqah (Arabic: حي عتيقة) or Utaiqah is a residential neighborhood and a subject of Baladiyah al-Batha in southern Riyadh, Saudi Arabia. Bordered by al-Yamamah neighborhood to the east and King Fahd Road to the west, it is one of the oldest neighborhoods of Riyadh.
