= Al Margab (Riyadh) =

Neighbourhood in southern Riyadh, Saudi Arabia

Al-Marqab حي المرقب
- Neighbourhood
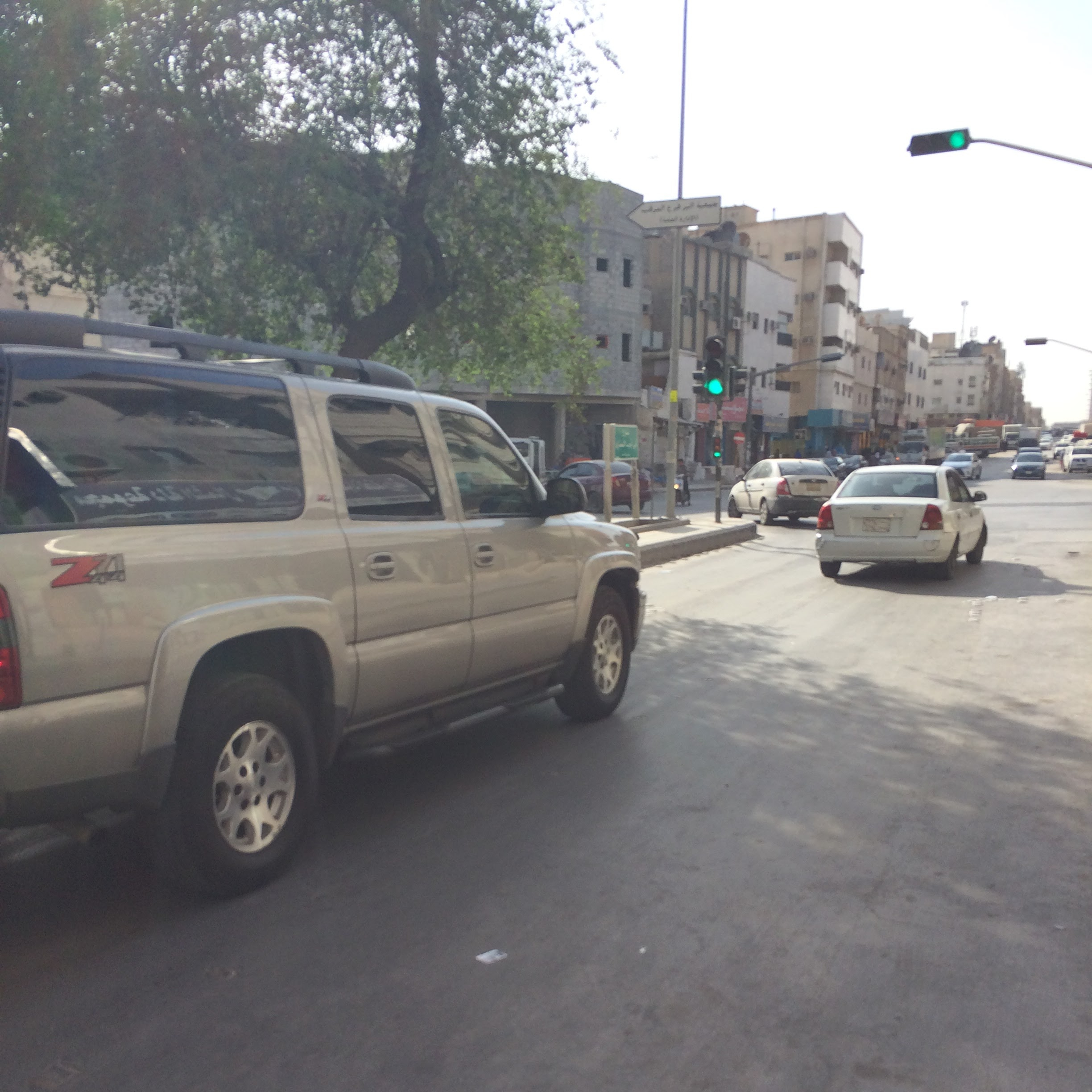
- Al Marqab, as seen from the Thulaim side of Abu Ayyub al-Ansari Road (around 2016)
- Interactive map of Al-Marqab
- Location within Saudi Arabia Location within Asia
- Coordinates: 24°38′5″N 46°43′34″E
- Country: Saudi Arabia
- City: Riyadh
- Region: Old Riyadh
- Named for: Margab Fort

Government
  - Body: Baladiyah Al Batha

Language
  - Official: Arabic

Al-Marqab (Arabic: المرقب, lit. 'watchtower'), or in Najdi vernacular pronunciation as al-Margab, is one of the oldest neighborhoods of Riyadh, Saudi Arabia, located east of al-Dirah and south of Thulaim in the sub-municipality of al-Batʼha. It was named after the Margab Fort, which was demolished in 1957. As the neighborhood is bounded by al-Batʼha Street to the west, its western strip partially forms part of the al-Batʼha commercial area.

The early traces of its existence dates back to 16th century, which nearly corresponds with the final stages of the disintegration of Hajr al-Yamamah that resulted in the succession of several settlements from the former.

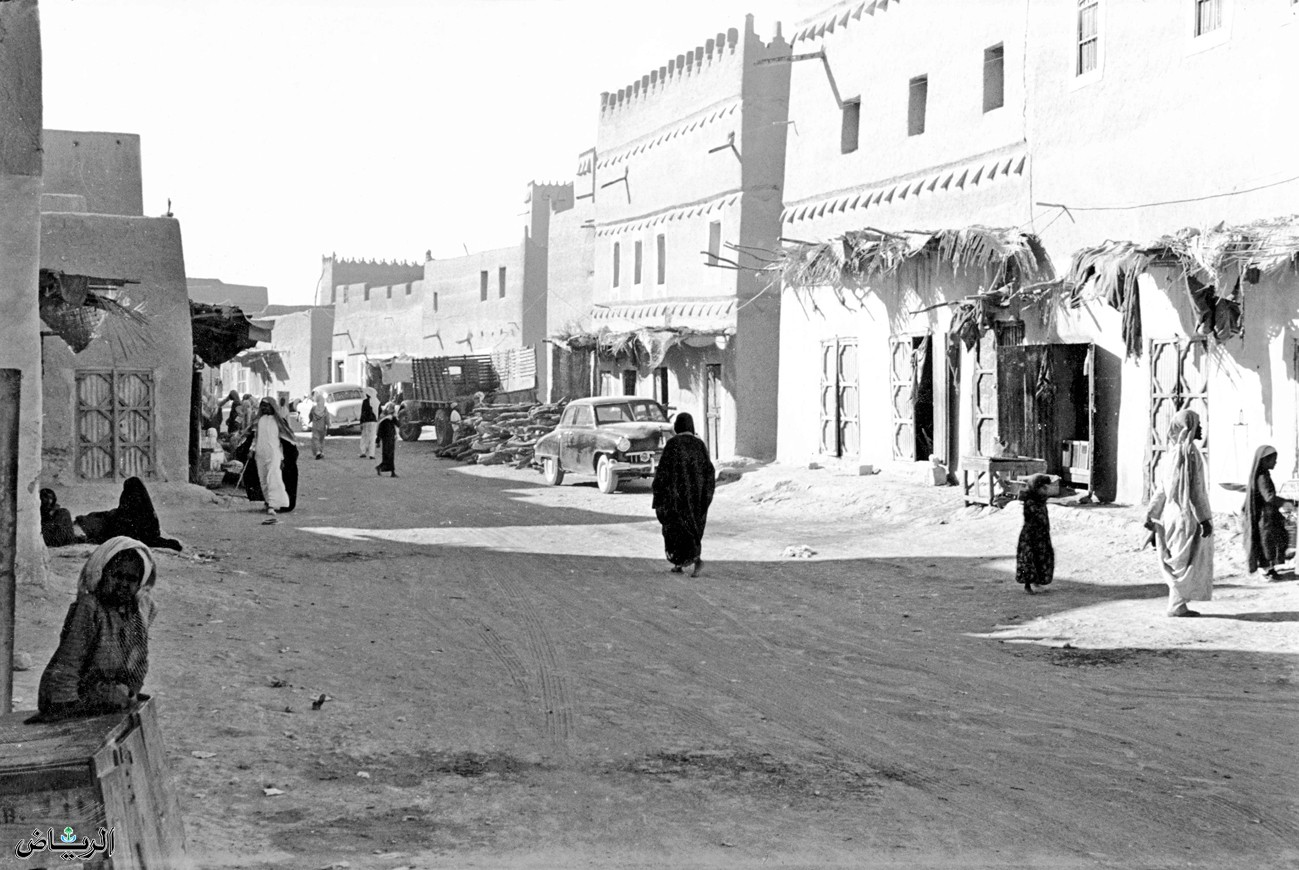
Margab, 1949
