= Skirina =

Skirina حي سكيرينة
- Neighbourhood
- Interactive map of Skirina
- Coordinates: 24°37′00″N 46°43′03″E
- Country: Saudi Arabia
- City: Riyadh

Government
  - Body: Baladiyah Al Batha

Language
  - Official: Arabic

Skirina (Arabic: حي سكيرينة) or at times al-Skirina is a subject of Baladiyah al-Batha and a residential neighborhood in southern Riyadh, Saudi Arabia. Bordered by Mi'kal neighborhood to the north and Manfuhah al-Jadidah to the south, it is one of the oldest neighborhoods of the city.
