= Al Khalidiya Park =

Park in Riyadh, Saudi Arabia

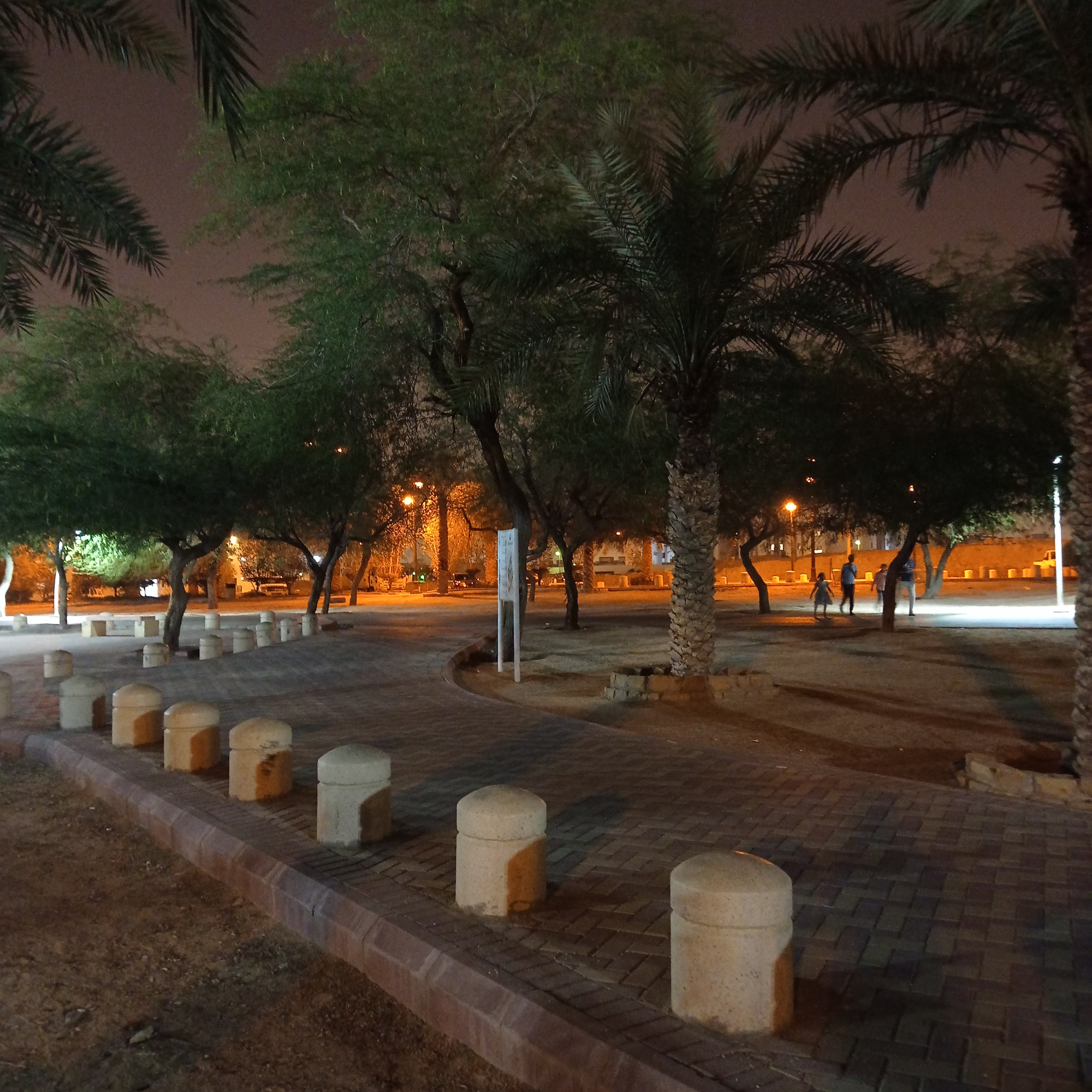
- Interactive map of Al Khalidiya Park
- Type: Urban park
- Location: Al-Khalidiyyah, Riyadh, Saudi Arabia
- Coordinates: 24°36′57″N 46°45′41″E
- Area: 5.6 hectares (14 acres)
- Opened: 4 February 2009 (reopening)

Al Khalidiya Park (Arabic: منتزة الخالدية) is a public park in the al-Khalidiyyah neighborhood of Riyadh, Saudi Arabia, located at an intersection of Southern Ring Road and Ali Ibn Abi Talib Road. The park started to receive large number of visitors after its complete rehabilitation and reopening in 2009 by Prince Dr. Abdulaziz Ayyaf al-Muqrin, the then Mayor of Riyadh. Most of the park's visitors flock during the weekends, Eid al-Fitr, Eid al-Adha and in publicly-organized events.

== History ==
Between late 2008 and early 2009, the park underwent a rehabilitation by the then Mayor of Riyadh, Prince Dr. Abdulaziz Ayyaf al-Muqrin, under whose directions 104 Arabian palm trees, a multi purpose playground for soccer, volleyball and basketball, two playgrounds for children, an 11.4 meter-square sit-in area, two water tanks and several internal pedestrian corridors of almost 630 meters were set up. The park was inaugurated on 4 February 2009 by the Mayor. Two months later, the Mayor inaugurated 1160 meters long and 13.40 meters wide pedestrian corridor surrounding the park.

== Location ==
Al Khalidiya Park is located in south-most of al-Khalidiyyah neighborhood in southern Riyadh, Saudi Arabia, at an in intersection of Southern Ring Road and Ali Ibn Abi Talib Road. The park covers an area of almost 5.6 hectares.
