= Al Aziziya Sub-Municipality =

Baladiyah in Riyadh, Saudi Arabia

Baladiyah Al-Aziziya بلدية العزيزية
- Baladiyah
- Country: Saudi Arabia
- City: Riyadh
- Boroughs: List: al-Aziziyah ad-Dar al-Baida al-Misfat Taybah al-Masani' al-Mansourah
- Website: aziziah.alriyadh.gov.sa

Baladiyah Al-Aziziya (Arabic: بلدية العزيزية, romanized: Baladīyah al-ʿAzīzīyyah), officially the Al-Aziziya Sub-Municipality, is an urban baladiyah and one of 16 sub-municipalities of southern Riyadh, Saudi Arabia, which includes 6 neighborhoods and districts, partially including al-Mansourah and is responsible for their development, planning and maintenance.

== Neighborhoods and districts ==
- Al-Aziziyah
- Ad-Dar al-Baida
- Al-Misfat
- Taybah
- Al-Masani'
- Al Mansourah (partially)
