= Al Owd =

Al-Owd حي العود
- Neighbourhood
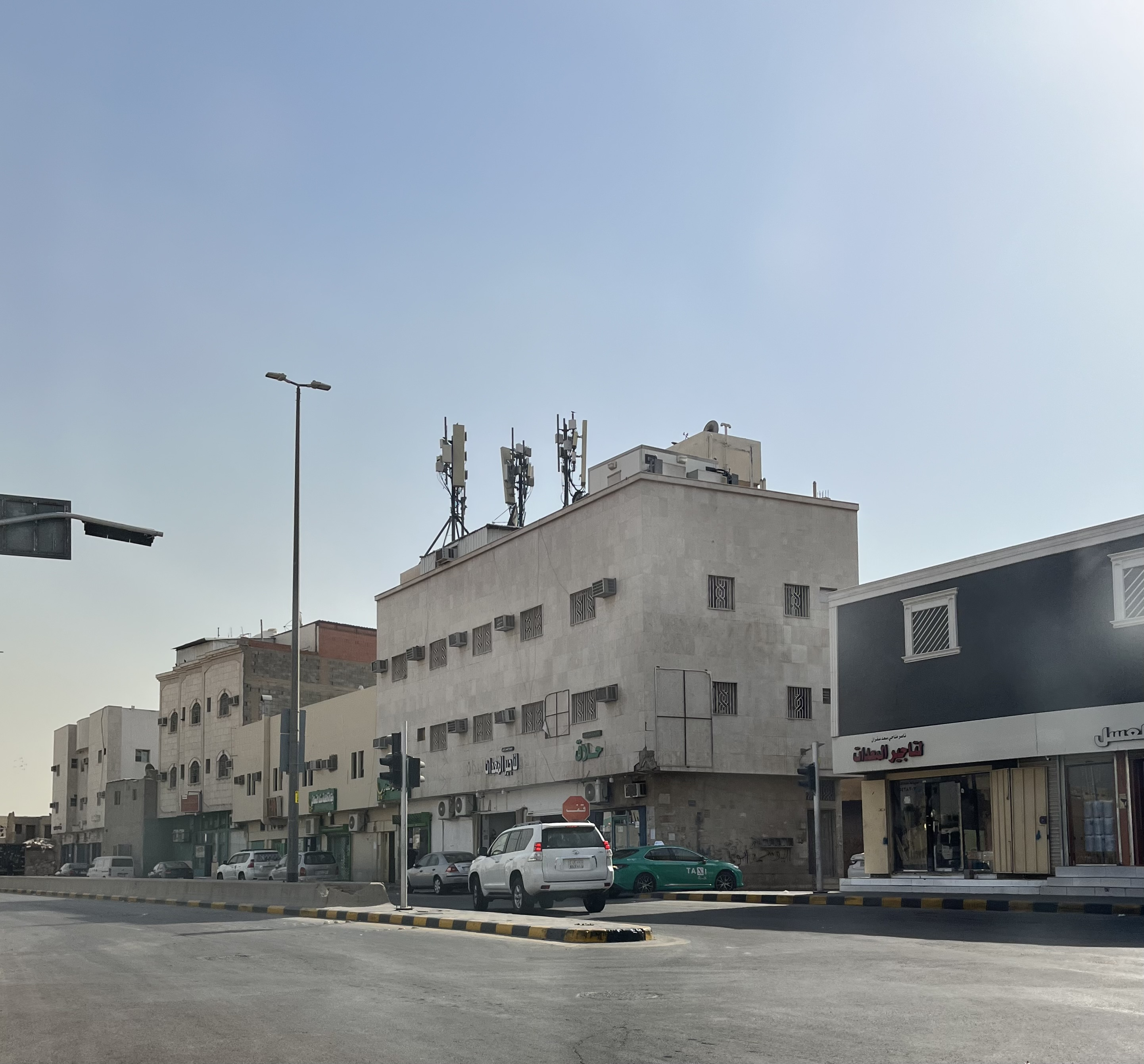
- Al Ras Street, 2024

- Location within Saudi Arabia Location within Asia
- Coordinates: 24°37′39″N 46°43′34″E
- Country: Saudi Arabia
- Province: Riyadh Province
- City: Riyadh

Government
  - Body: Baladiyah Al Batha

Area
  - Total: 291 ha (720 acres)

Language
  - Official: Arabic

Al-Owd (Arabic: حي العود), alternatively transliterated as al-Oud or al-ʼUd, is a former village and a residential neighborhood in Riyadh, Saudi Arabia, located south of Margab and west of al-Salhiyah in the sub-municipality of al-Batha. Covering an area of 291 hectares, it contains the famous al-Oud cemetery. It shares borders with Gabrah and al-Bateha neighborhoods to the west and as-Salhiyah and Ghubairah neighborhoods to the east.

== In popular culture ==
The neighborhood was featured in the 2020 Saudi Arabian drama film The Tambour of Retribution.
