= Al Amal (Riyadh) =

Neighbourhood in downtown Riyadh, Saudi Arabia

Al-ʽAmal العمل
- Neighbourhood
- Al Amal neighborhood, 2024

- Location within Saudi Arabia
- Coordinates: 24°38′44″N 46°43′27″E
- Country: Saudi Arabia
- City: Riyadh
- Sub-municipality: Al-Malaz
- Established: 1960s

Language
  - Official: Arabic

Al-ʽAmal (Arabic: العمل, lit. 'labor'), formerly al-Ghurabi (Arabic: الغرابي) and Shiʽab (Arabic: شعاب, lit. 'watercourse'), is a commercial and residential neighborhood situated along the al-Batʼha Street in downtown Riyadh, Saudi Arabia, located north of Thulaim and east of al-Futah in the sub-municipality of al-Malaz. As the neighborhood is bounded by al-Batʼha Street to the west, its western strip partially forms part of the al-Batʼha commercial area.

== Background ==
Automobile workshops in al-Amal neighborhood, 2024

Al-ʽAmal emerged between the 1950s and 1960s during the reign of King Saud bin Abdulaziz and is inhabited mostly by overseas workers from the Philippines and various other nationalities since the oil boom of the 1970s. It hosts the Ghurabi Street in the al-Batʼha section of the neighborhood, that is famous for its automobile spare parts stores. Its name is attributed to the former headquarters of the Ministry of Labor that was previously located in the area.
