= Manfuhah Al Jadidah =

Manfuhah al-Jadidah حي منفوحة الجديدة
- Neighbourhood
- Location within Saudi Arabia Location within Asia
- Coordinates: 24°37′10″N 46°43′21″E
- Country: Saudi Arabia
- City: Riyadh

Government
  - Body: Baladiyah Al Batha

Language
  - Official: Arabic

Manfuhah al-Jadidah (Arabic: حي منفوحة الجديدة, lit. 'The New Manfuhah') is a subject of Baladiyah al-Batha and a residential neighborhood in southern Riyadh, Saudi Arabia. It shares proximity with Skirinah neighborhood to the north and al-Yamamah and al-Manfuhah neighborhoods to the south.
