= Wadi al-Batʼha =

Ancient wadi in Najd, Saudi Arabia

Wadi al-Batʼha/al-Wutar
- Native name: Wadi al-Batʼha (Arabic); Wadi al-Wutar (Arabic)

Location
- Country: Saudi Arabia

Physical characteristics
- Source: Shiʿb Abu Rufia (previously) al-Masani (present-day)
  - location: south of al-Masani, Riyadh
- Mouth: Wadi Hanifa
  - location: Al-Masani, Riyadh
  - coordinates: 24.52721°N 46.76290°E

Wadi al-Batʼha (Arabic: وادي البطحاء, lit. 'the wide valley'), historically known as Wadi al-Wutar (Arabic: وادي الوتر), is an ancient river valley under rehabilitation in the Najd region of Riyadh Province, Saudi Arabia. The valley once descended from Shiʿb Abu Rufia, and traversed from northwest to south, cutting through town of Riyadh before meeting Wadi Hanifa in the southwest. The remnants of the valley today originate and end in the al-Masani neighborhood and has a length of almost 6.5 km, with the stream draining into Wadi Hanifa as per its previous river mouth. It has lent its name to the al-Batʼha Street in downtown Riyadh, which runs parallel to the now-dried up stream of the wadi, as well as the locality surrounding it and the sub-municipality.
