= Al Salhiyah (Riyadh) =

Al-Salhiyah حي الصالحية
- Neighbourhood
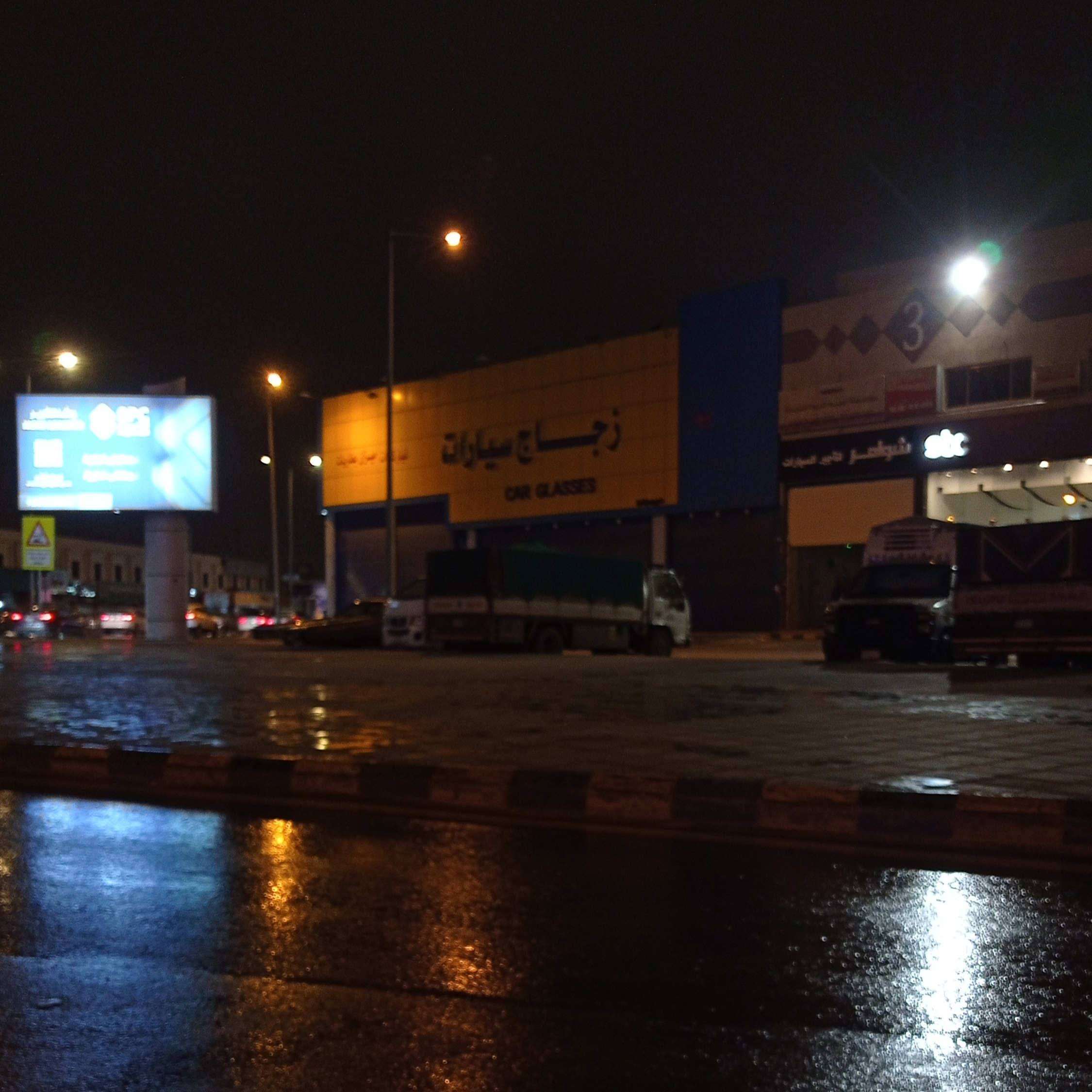
- Al Salihiyah, as viewed from Al Kharj Road, 2023

- Location within Saudi Arabia Location within Asia
- Coordinates: 24°38′3″N 46°44′2″E
- Country: Saudi Arabia
- City: Riyadh

Government
  - Body: Baladiyah Al Batha

Area
  - Total: 48 ha (120 acres)

Language
  - Official: Arabic

Al-Salhiyah (Arabic: حي الصالحية) is a residential neighborhood and a subject of Baladiyah al-Batha in Riyadh, Saudi Arabia. Spread across 48 hectares, it shares borders with al-Oud neighborhood to the west and Sinaiyah Qadeem to the east. The locality is mostly inhabited by overseas workers of various nationalities, including Yemenis and Indians.
