= Al Batʼha Sub-Municipality =

Baladiyah al-Batʼha بلدية البطحاء (Arabic)
- Baladiyah
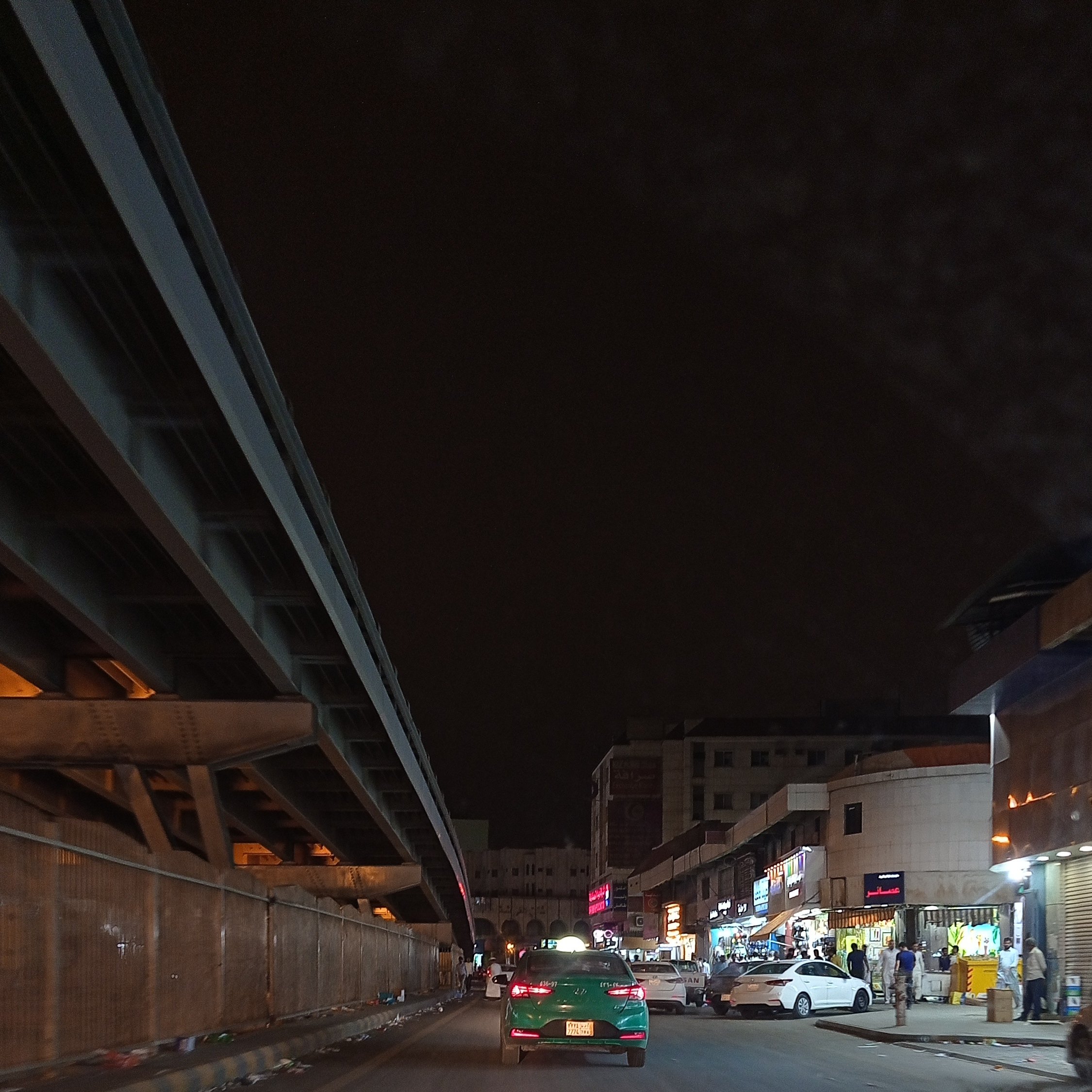
- al-Batha commercial area, 2023
- Country: Saudi Arabia
- City: Riyadh
- Boroughs: List: al-Dubiyah Mikal Jabrah al-Manfuhah Manfuhah al-Jadidah al-Yamamah al-Bateha Ghubairah al-Khalidiyyah al-Salhiyah al-Marqab al-Qiri al-Wusaita al-Faisaliyyah al-Mansourah al-Salam Utaiqah ad-Dirah Al Oud Skirinah

Language
  - Official: Arabic
- Website: batha.alriyadh.gov.sa

Al-Batʼha Sub-Municipality (Arabic: بلدية البطحاء الفرعية, romanized: Baladiyyah al-Baṭḥāʾ al-Farʿiyyah) is one of the 16 baladiyahs of Riyadh, Saudi Arabia. It includes the neighbourhoods of ad-Dirah and Margab, two of the five districts that partially form part of the al-Batʼha commercial area and as well as Manfuhah, al-Mansourah, al-Khalidiyyah and parts of Sinaiyah Qadeem. It was named after Wadi al-Batha and was made into a municipal division (baladiyah) in 1977 during the reign of King Khalid.

== Neighbourhoods and sub-districts ==
Baladiyah al-Batha consists of several neighbourhoods and sub-districts, which are:

- al-Dubiyah
- Mikal
- Jabrah
- al-Manfuhah
- Manfuhah al-Jadidah
- al-Yamamah
- Sinaiyah Qadeem (partially)
- Al Bateha
- Ghubaira
- al-Khalidiyyah
- al-Salhiyah
- al-Marqab
- al-Qiri
- al-Wusaita
- al-Faisaliyyah
- al-Mansourah (partially)
- al-Salam
- Utaiqah
- ad-Dirah
- Al Oud
- Skirinah
