= Al-Khalidiah (Riyadh) =

Al-Khalidiah حي الخالدية
- Neighbourhood
- Al-Khalidiah, 2022
- Interactive map of Al-Khalidiah
- Coordinates: 24°37′26″N 46°45′18″E
- Country: Saudi Arabia
- City: Riyadh
- Region: Old Riyadh
- Named for: Khalid bin Abdulaziz

Government
  - Body: Baladiyah Al Batha

Language
  - Official: Arabic
  - Spoken: Bangla, Hindi, Urdu, Yemeni Arabic, Malayalam

Al-Khalidiah (Arabic: حي الخالدية, romanized: ḥaī al-Khālidīyah) is a low-income residential neighborhood in southeastern Riyadh, Saudi Arabia, located south of as-Sinaiyah and west of al-Faisaliyyah in the sub-municipality of al-Batʼha. It emerged as an offshoot of Hillat al-Anouz (Arabic: حلة العنوز, lit. 'quarter of Anizah') and was renamed in the 1980s after King Khalid bin Abdulaziz. It is today inhabited mostly by overseas Indian, Pakistani, Bangladeshi and Yemeni migrant workers and their families.

The area was previously inhabited by Arabs who mostly belonged to the Anizah tribe, and thus, was named Hillat al-Anouz.

Covering an area of 950 acres, it is bordered between Ali Ibn Abi Talib Road to the east, Al Kharj Road to the west and Southern Ring Road to the south. The locality is also known for serving several schools and health centers for nearby districts besides being unpopular among residents for its seasonal power outages. The al-Khalidiya Park is also located in the southernmost extreme of the neighborhood. Since the late 1980s, the High Commission for the Development of Riyadh has implemented a series of projects in the neighborhood in order to reduce the groundwater levels.

== Gallery ==
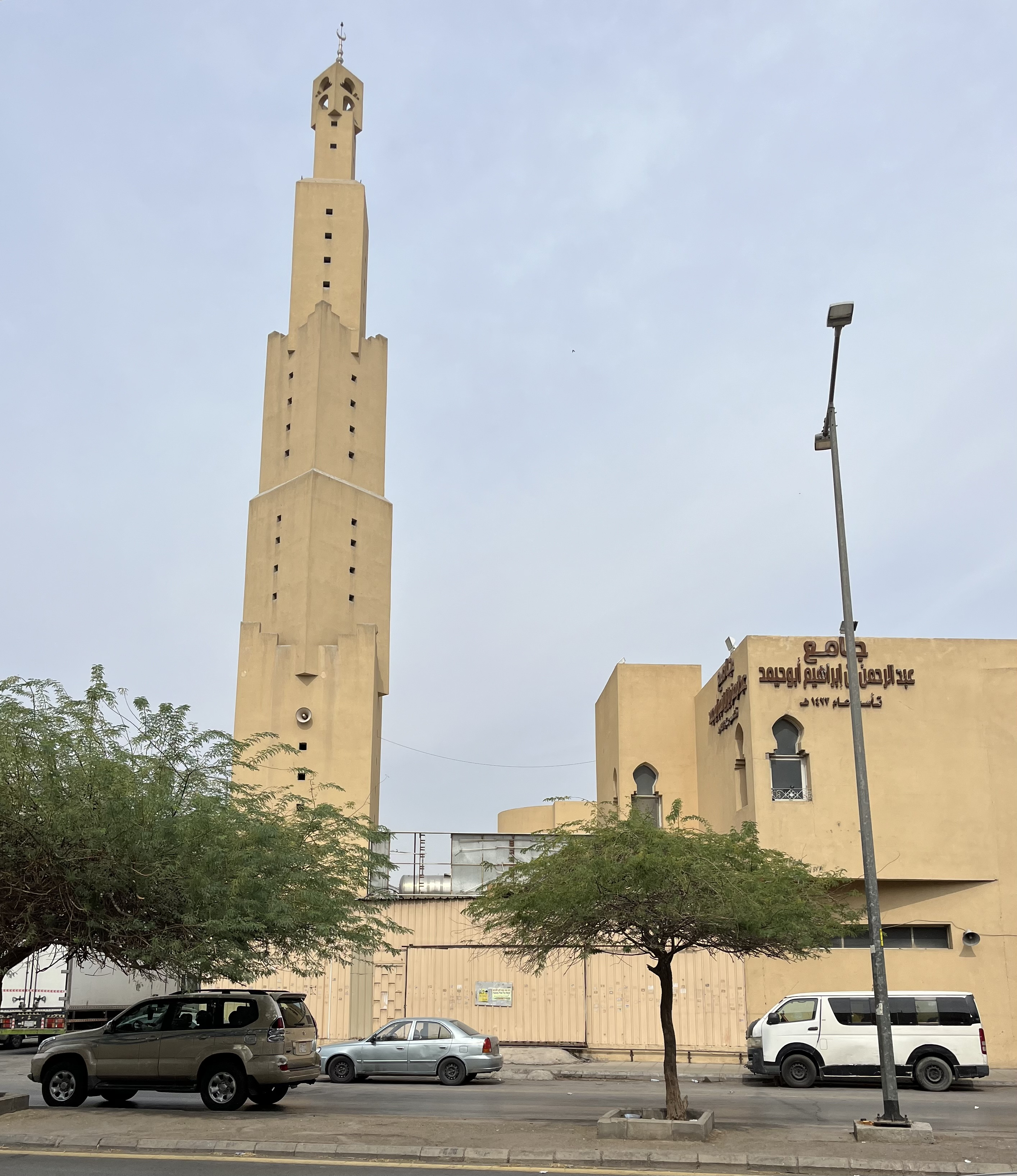
Abdul Rahman ibn Ibrahim Abu Hameed Mosque in 2023, the primary landmark of the neighbourhood

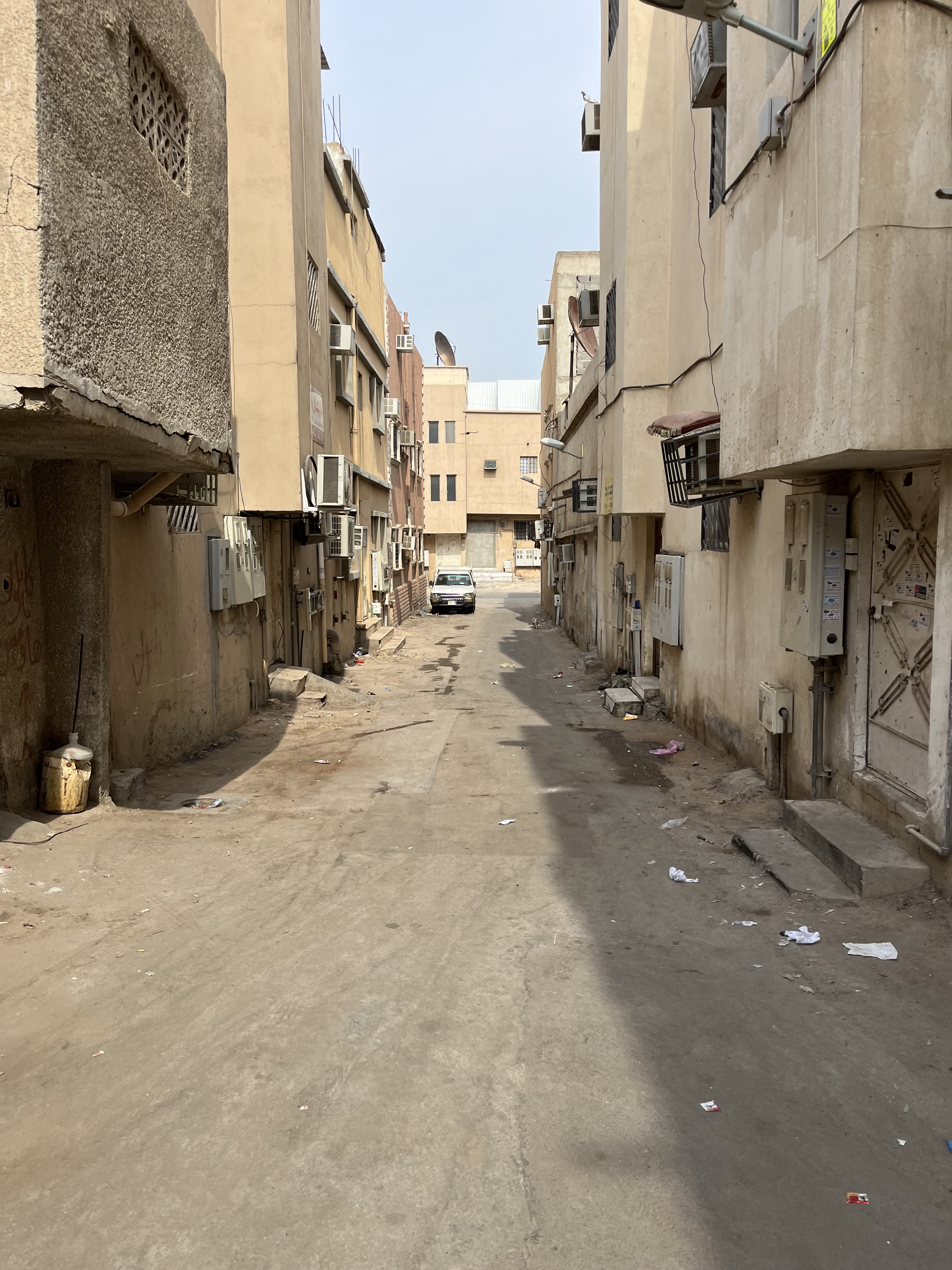
An alleyway in the al-Khalidiyyah neighbourhood

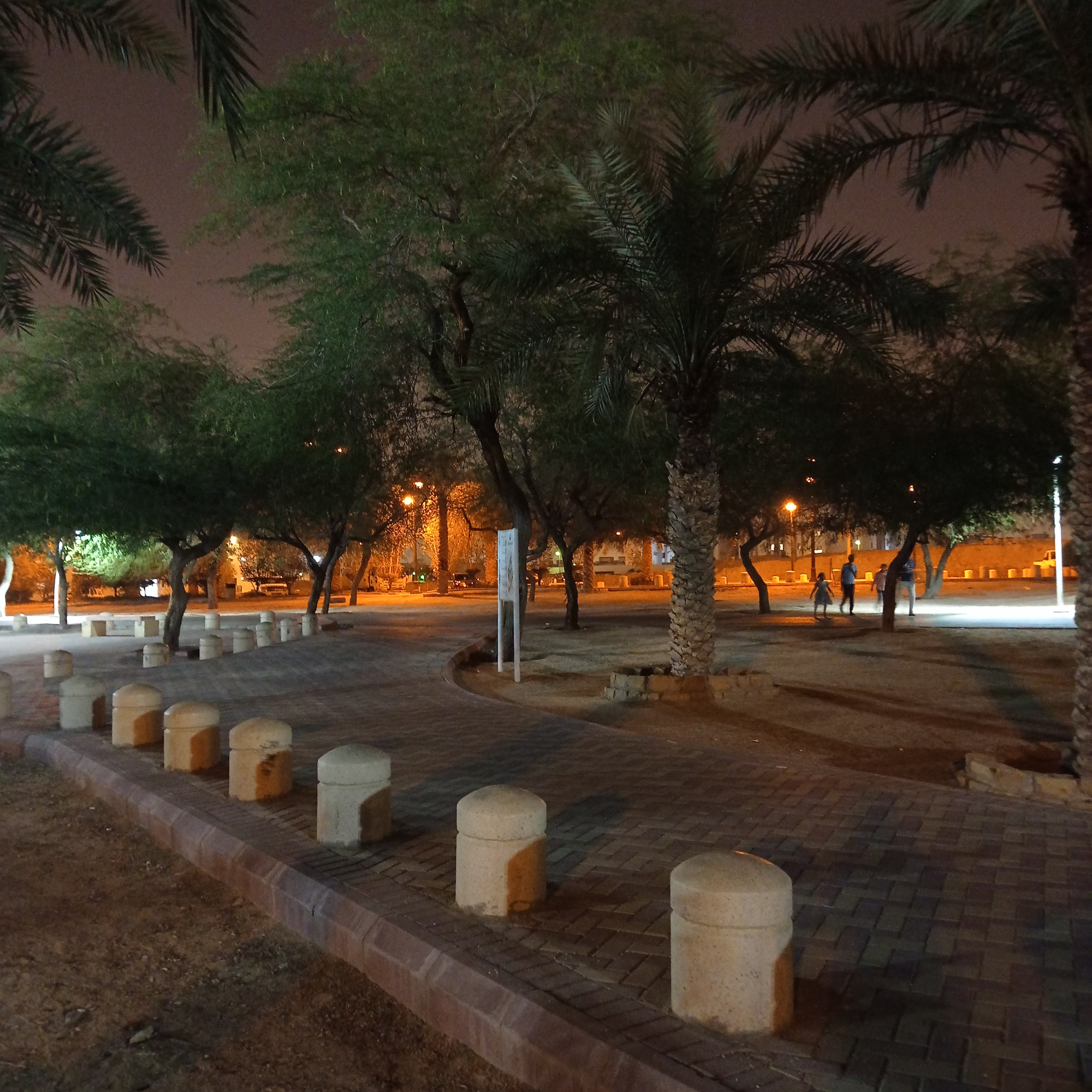
Al-Khalidiyah Park, 2023
