= Al Yamamah (Riyadh) =

Al Yamamah حي اليمامة
- Neighbourhood
- Location within Saudi Arabia Location within Asia
- Coordinates: 24°35′46″N 46°42′57″E
- Country: Saudi Arabia
- City: Riyadh
- Named for: Al Yamama

Government
  - Body: Baladiyah Al Batha

Language
  - Official: Arabic

Al-Yamamah (Arabic: حي اليمامة) is a residential neighborhood and a subject of Baladiyah al-Batha in Riyadh, Saudi Arabia. It is bordered by al-Manfuhah neighborhood to the west, Southern Ring Road to the south and Manfuhah al-Jadidah to the north. It is named after the historical region of al-Yamama.
