= Jabrah (Riyadh) =

Jabrah حي جبرة
- Neighbourhood
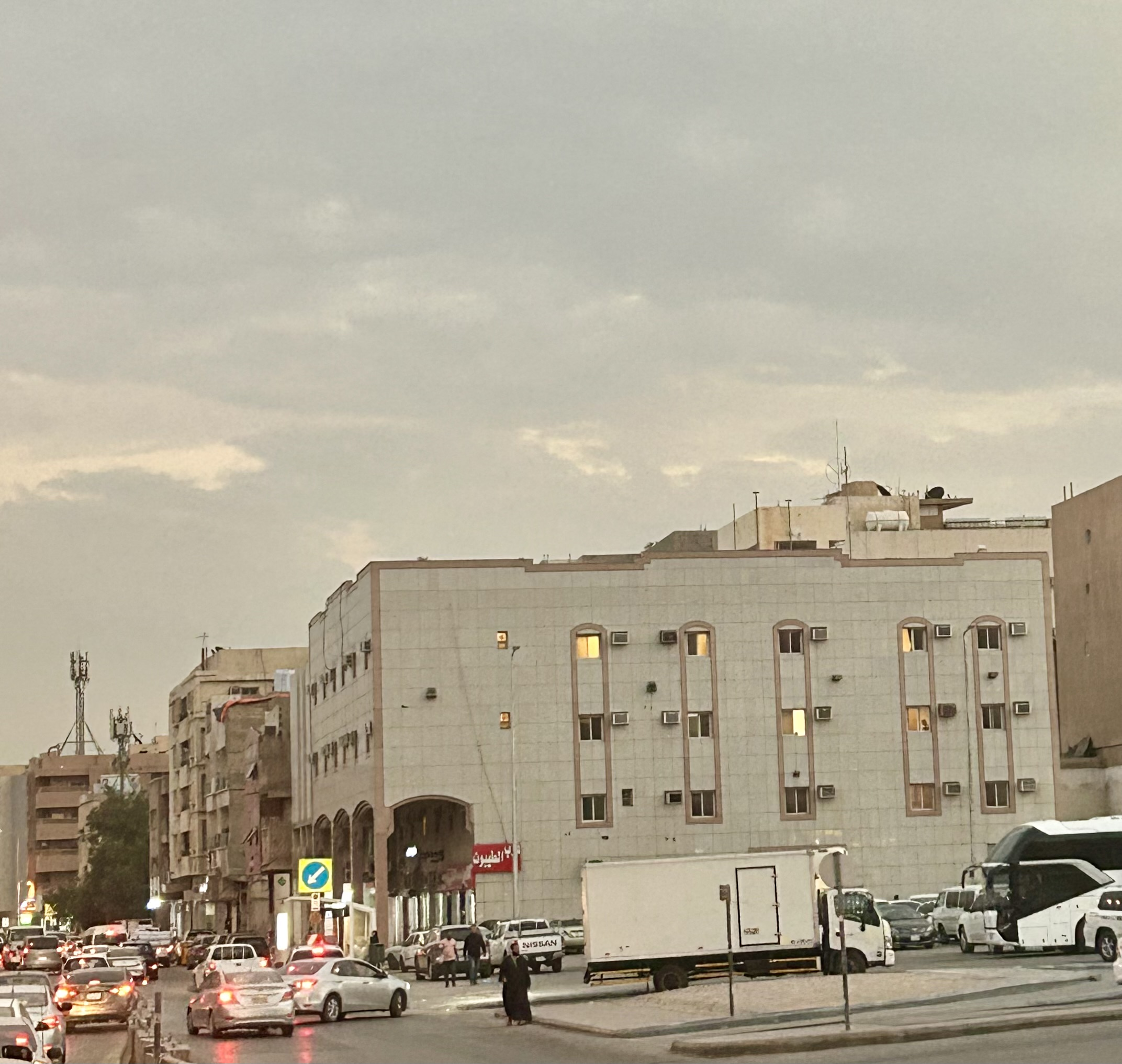
- Jabrah, 2024
- Interactive map of Jabrah
- Coordinates: 24°37′31″N 46°43′10″E
- Country: Saudi Arabia
- City: Riyadh
- Region: Old Riyadh

Government
  - Body: Baladiyah Al Batha

Language
  - Official: Arabic

Jabrah (Arabic: حي جبرة) or Gabrah, is a subject of Baladiyah al-Batha and one of the oldest neighborhoods that came into being after the disintegration of Hajr al-Yamamah in southern Riyadh, Saudi Arabia. The area also gets synonymous with al-Batha or ad-Dirah because of its close proximity with them.
