= Al Dirah =

Al Dirah حي الديرة
- Neighbourhood
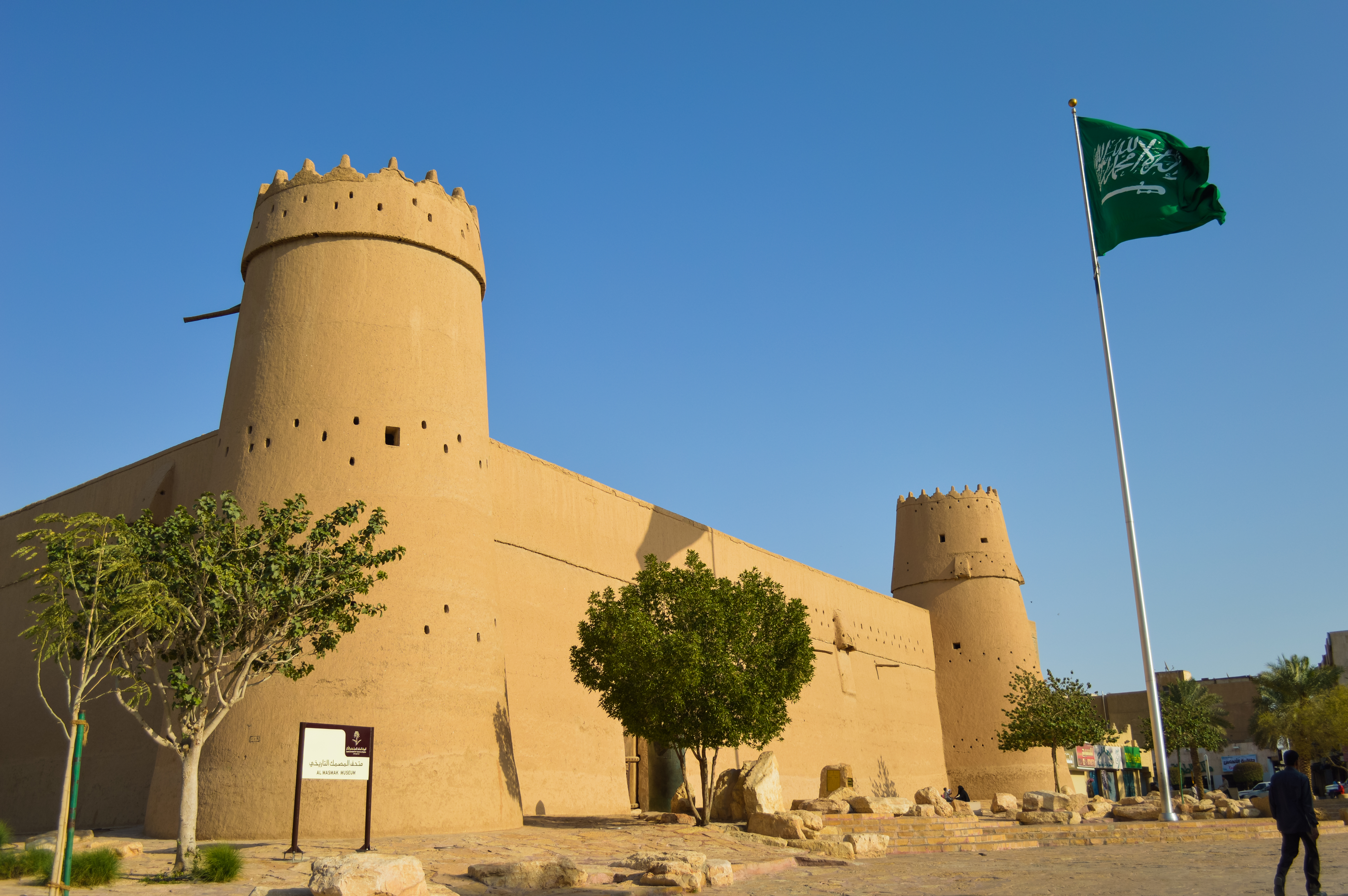
- Masmak Fort, 2014
- Country: Saudi Arabia
- City: Riyadh
- Region: Old Riyadh

Government
  - Body: Baladiyah al-Batha

Language
  - Official: Arabic

Al Dirah (Arabic: الديرة, romanized: ad-Dayra, lit. 'the Abode'), alternatively transliterated as Deira, Deirah, Dheera, Deerah or Deera, is a neighborhood in southern Riyadh, Saudi Arabia, located south of al-Futah and west of Margab in the sub-municipality of al-Batʼha. Forming the kernel of the old city region, the northern part makes up the ruins of the extinct settlement of Duhairah meanwhile the remainder consists most of the Qasr al-Hukm District. It lies in the geographic center of the city's downtown neighborhoods, whereby its eastern strip partially forms part of the al-Batʼha commercial area.

Named after Deirah markets, it is today a popular tourist attraction as it hosts several historical and traditional landmarks, such as the Justice Palace (Qasr al-Hukm), al-Masmak Fort, and Deera Square. The origins of the neighborhood can be traced back to 1737 when Deham bin Dawas al-Shalaan took over Riyadh.

== In popular culture ==
- Baby (2015), a fictional city in Saudi Arabia named Al Dera that hosts the Chop Chop Square.
