= Hajr =

Ancient settlement in Saudi Arabia

Hajr al-Yamamah
- حَجْر اليَمامَة (Arabic)
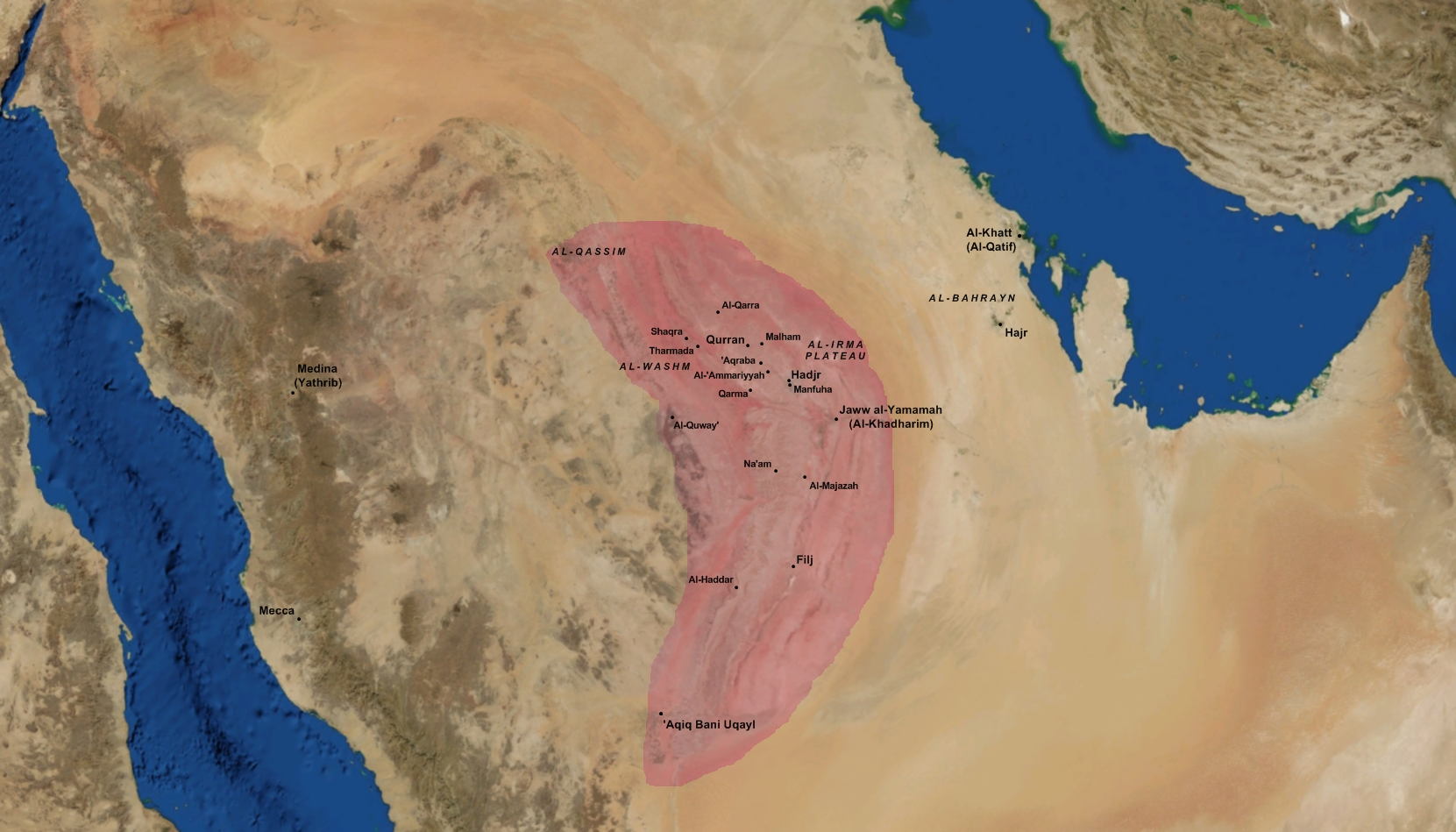
- Location of Hajr in al-Yamama region
- Location: Riyadh Province, Saudi Arabia
- Region: West Asia

History
- Built: Upper Paleolithic period
- Built by: Tasm and Jadis (folklore); Hanifites
- Abandoned: 16th century AD; disintegrated into various towns which later became part of Old Riyadh

Hajr (Arabic: حَجْر, romanized: Ḥajr), also known as Hajr al-Yamamah (Arabic: حَجْر اليَمامَة, romanized: Ḥajr al-Yamāmah) or Khadra Hajr, was an ancient city founded by the Hanifites that roughly emerged in 5th century pre-Islamic Arabia and existed until 16th century in modern-day Riyadh in the Najd region of present-day Saudi Arabia.

Hajr was the seat of the historical al-Yamama region until 866 AD when the Ukhaydhirites seceded the area from the control of the Abbasids and shifted their capital to al-Kharj. Consequently, Hajr underwent severe economic and political decline due to prolonged droughts besides simultaneously being gripped in feudalistic conflicts with its neighbors such as Diriyah and Manfuhah. Hajr subsequently witnessed gradual fragmentation and disintegration and eventually got succeeded by various rival towns such as Migrin (or Miqrin) and Miʼkal by the end of 16th century, though the name Hajr continued to appear in local folk poetry.

== History ==
According to various historical accounts and folklore, Hajr was founded by the lost Arabian tribes of Tasm and Jadis in around 1st millennium BC. Archaeological surveys show that the city dates back to the Upper Paleolithic era. After their extermination in a genocide led by the Himyarite king Hassan Yuha'min, it was merged into the Yemenite Kingdom of Kinda and was later inhabited by Banu Hanifa nearly two centuries before the advent of Islam. After the advent of Islam by 7th century, most of its inhabitants converted to Islam and became part of the new Rashidun Caliphate and then the Umayyad Caliphate. After the overthrow of the Umayyads in the Abbasid Revolution in 8th century, Hajr became part of the Abbasid Caliphate and was still the seat of al-Yamama region until it was seceded by the prevailing Ukhaydhirites in 866 AD when they made al-Kharj their new capital. Consequently, Hajr underwent severe economic and political decline due to prolonged droughts besides simultaneously being indulged in feudalistic conflicts with its neighbors such as Diriyah and Manfuhah. Hajr eventually witnessed steady fragmentation and was succeeded by various rival towns such as Migrin (or Miqrin) and Miʼkal by the end of 16th century. After 1578, Najdi chroniclers stopped mentioning Hajr by name. Famous 14th century Moroccan traveler and explorer Ibn Battuta travelled to Hajr and described it as "a good, fertile city with rivers and trees, inhabited by sects of Arabs, and most of them are from Banu Hanifa, which is their country in the past, and their ruler is Tufail bin Ghanem"
