= Miʼkal (Riyadh) =

Maʼkal معكال
- Neighbourhood
- Location within Saudi Arabia Location within Asia
- Coordinates: 24°37′22″N 46°42′53″E
- Country: Saudi Arabia
- City: Riyadh

Government
  - Body: Baladiyah Al Batha

Language
  - Official: Arabic

Miʼkal or Maʼkal (Arabic: بلدة معكال, romanized: baldah Maʿkāl, lit. 'Maʼkal township') is an ancient village and a historic neighborhood in southern Riyadh, Saudi Arabia, located that is a subject of Baladiyah al-Batha in southern Riyadh, Saudi Arabia, located between ad-Dubiyah and al-Wusaita. The town came into existence when Hajr al-Yamamah disintegrated up into several settlements and estates in the 16th century (10 AH), the most notable of them being Migrin (or Muqrin) and Ma'kal. Its name reportedly comes from two pre-Islamic Arabian deities, Kāl and Maʿkāl (Arabic: كال ومعكال) that were worshipped in Najd.

== History ==
The town came into existence when Hajr al-Yamamah disintegrated up into several settlements and estates in the 16th century (10th century AH), the most notable of them being Migrin (or Muqrin) and Ma'kal. It was reportedly named after two pre-Islamic Arabian deities, Kāl and Maʿkāl (Arabic: كال ومعكال) that were worshipped in Najd.

According to historian Abd al-Malik ibn Husayn al-Isami al-Makki, Maʼkal was also the site of a military conflict when it was besieged in 1578 (986 AH) by 50 soldiers of the Sharif of Mecca Abu Numayy II in which he killed several of its political leaders and imprisoned others for almost a year until they agreed to pay concessions.
