= Manfuhah =

Ancient village in Riyadh, Saudi Arabia

Coordinates: 24°35′46″N 46°43′38″E

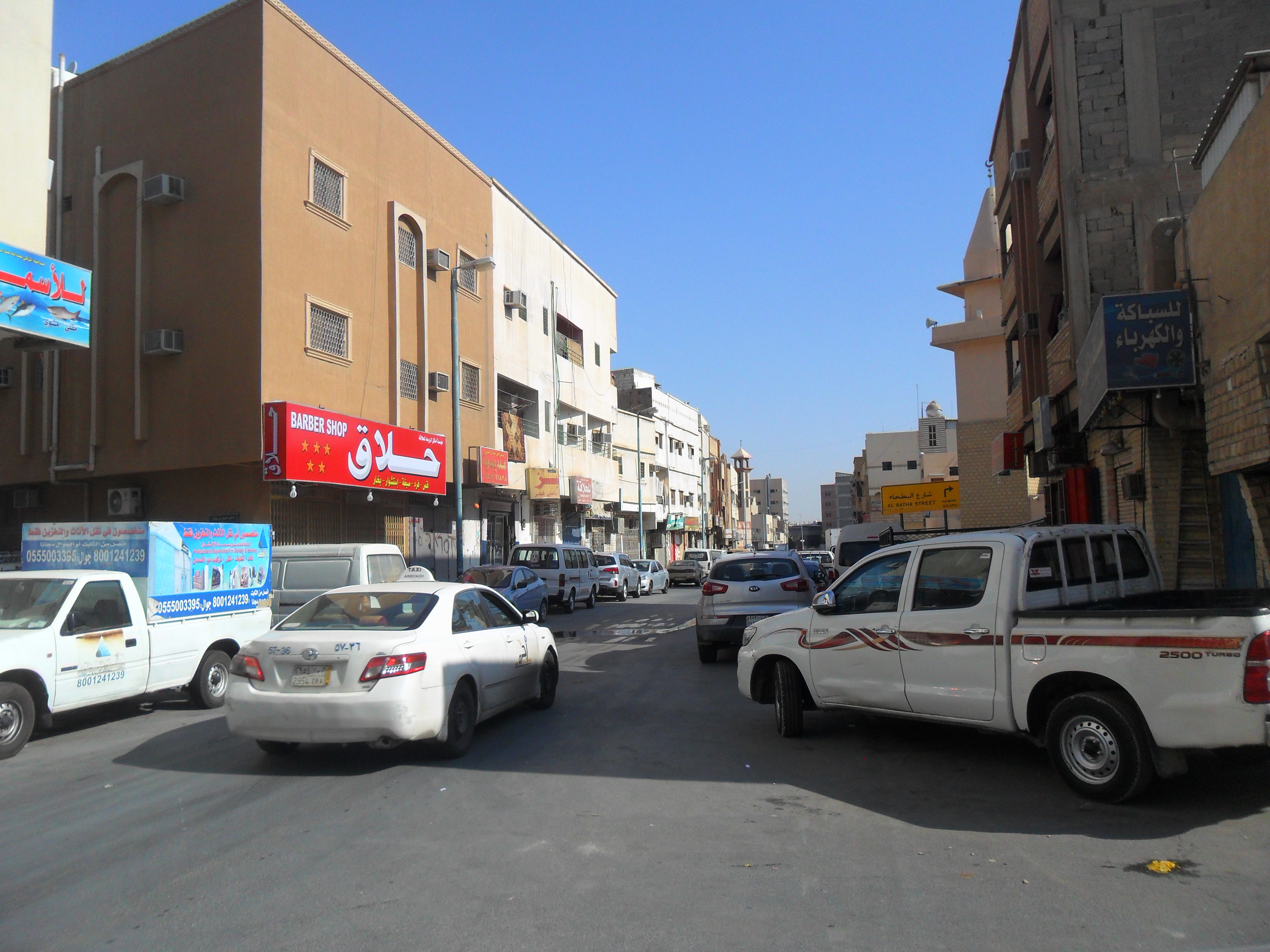
Manfuha in Riyadh City

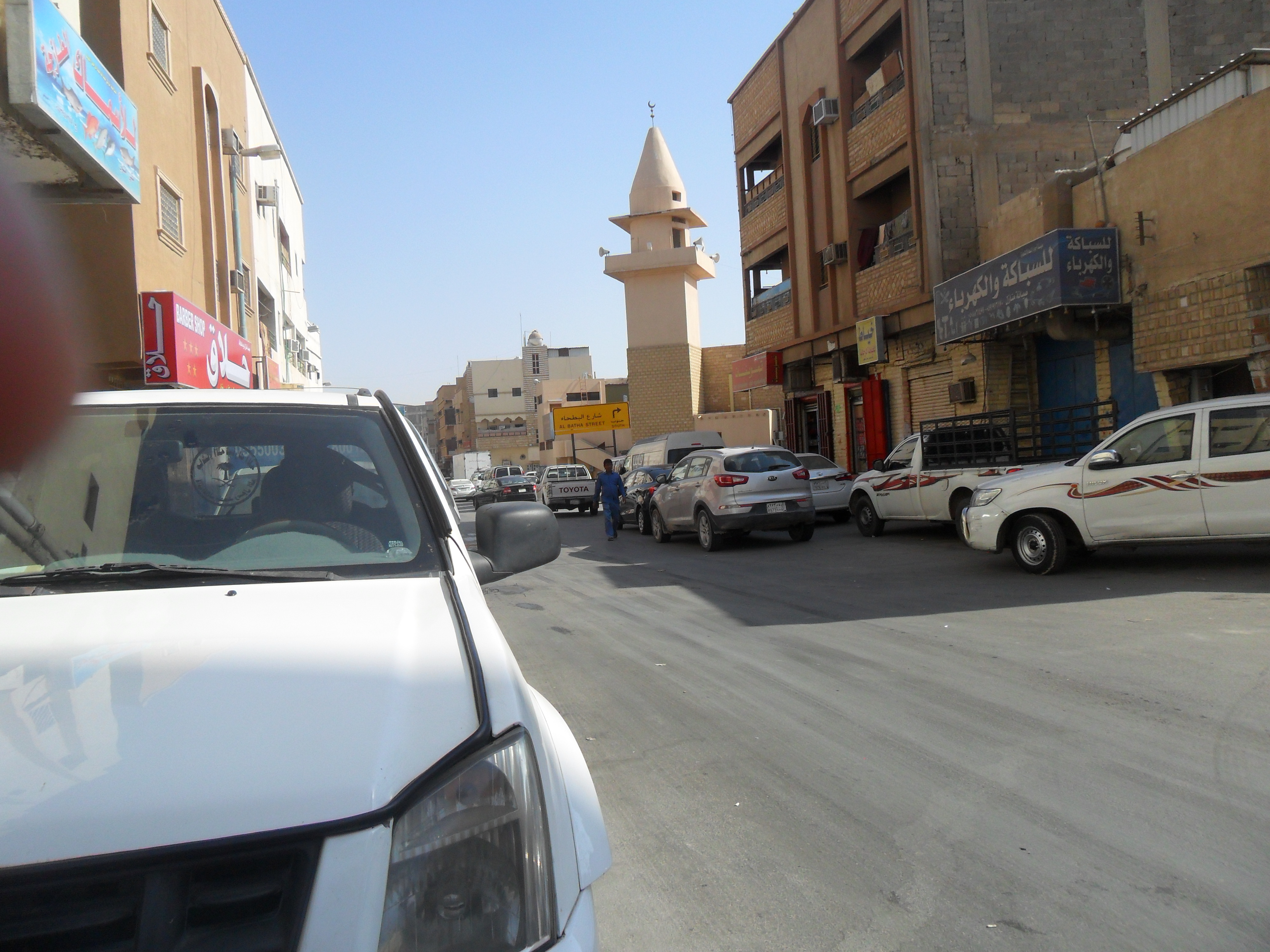
Another view in Manfuha

Manfuha (Arabic: منفوحة) is an ancient village and a historic neighborhood in southern Riyadh, Saudi Arabia, located north of al-Masani and south of Skirina in the sub-municipality of al-Batʼha. Established on the edge of the narrow, fertile valley known as Wadi Hanifa, Manfuha was until the mid-20th century considered a twin village to the walled town of Riyadh, the current Saudi capital.

== Etymology ==
Manfuhah derives from the Arabic word of nafaha (Arabic: نفح, romanized: nafaḥa), which loosely translates to blowing wind or being fragrant. It was reportedly attributed to its climatic nature.

== History ==
According to Yaqut's 13th-century geographical encyclopedia Mu'jam Al-Buldan, Manfuha was built a few centuries before Islam at the same time as Hajr (now Riyadh) by members of the Banu Hanifa tribe and their cousins from the tribe of Bakr. Manfuha was home to the famous Arab poet Al-A'sha, who died at around the same time as the Muslim prophet Muhammad, but little is heard of Manfuha after that time. At the turn of the 20th century, its population was made up largely of members of Banu Hanifa and Bakr (who by now had come to identify themselves with the related tribe of 'Anizzah), as well as members of Tamim and Subay'. Like all Nejdi towns, its population also included a large percentage of non-tribally-affiliated tradesmen (sonnaa'), as well as many slaves and freedmen working as agricultural labourers. Like Riyadh, the town was surrounded by gardens and palm groves.

In the late 18th century, Manfuha fell under the rule of the energetic ruler of Riyadh, Deham ibn Dawwas, who at the time was vigorously resisting the expansion of the new Wahhabist state established by the Al Saud clan of neighbouring Diriyah (see First Saudi State). Both towns eventually succumbed to the Saudis, however, who ruled over Manfuha until their state was destroyed by an Ottoman-Egyptian invasion in 1818. From then on, the town's fortunes largely followed those of its neighbour, Riyadh, returning to Saudi rule under Turki ibn Abdallah in 1824, then falling under the rule of the Al Rashid clan of Ha'il in the 1890s, before reverting to Saudi rule less than ten years later under the founder of Saudi Arabia, Abdul Aziz Ibn Saud.

As the neighbouring Saudi capital expanded exponentially in the 20th century, fueled by the country's oil wealth, the walls of both Manfuha and Riyadh were torn down, and Manfuha was quickly swallowed in whole by the growing metropolis. Today, Manfuha is among the poorer districts of Riyadh as most of its original inhabitants have left to newer districts of the capital. Some of the town's old mud-brick buildings remain, as well as an ancient observation tower. A wide avenue cuts through the centre of Manfuha, named Al-A'sha Street, after its most famous son.

Manfuha is now a neighbourhood in southern Riyadh.
