= Walled town of Riyadh =

Original core of the city of Riyadh

Walled town of Riyadh بلدة الرياض المسورة
- Fortress city
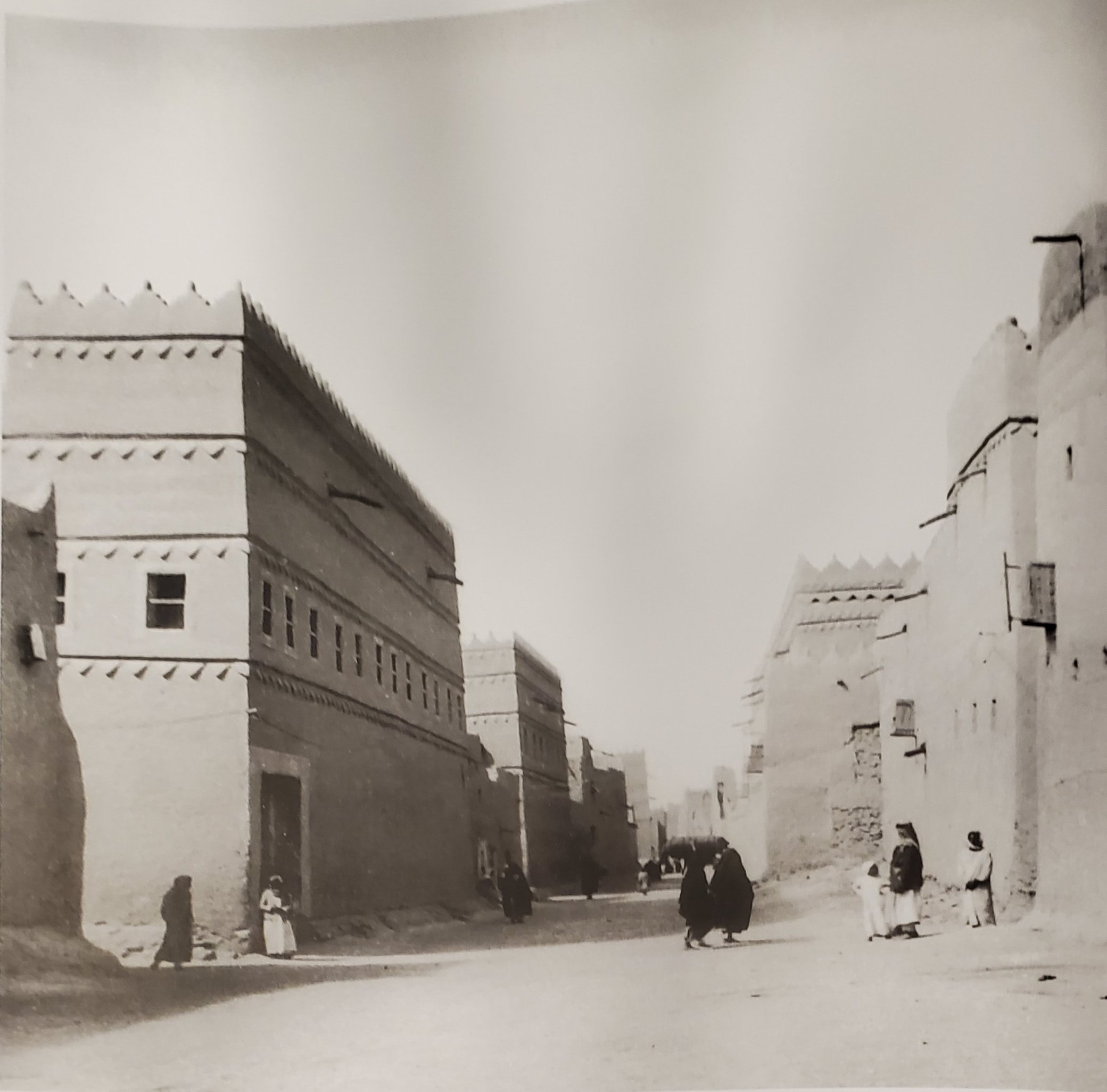
- Thumairi Street, 1938
- Interactive map of Walled town of Riyadh
- Coordinates: 24°37′50.6″N 46°42′38.9″E
- Country: Saudi Arabia
- City: Riyadh
- Region: Old Riyadh
- Established: 1746
- Wahhabi takeover: 1773
- Capital, Emirate of Nejd: 1824
- Battle of Riyadh: 1902
- Capital, Saudi Arabia: 1932
- Dismantling of fortifications: 1950
- Founder: Dahham ibn Dawwas
- Quarters: Neighborhoods list: Gadimah; Duhairah; Ajnab; Mugailiyah; Muraighib; Ghanaiy; Sharqiyah; Dakhna; Doho

Area
  - Land: 1 km^{2} (0.39 sq mi)

Population (1918)
  - Total: 19,000

The walled town of Riyadh was the original core of Riyadh, the modern-day capital of Saudi Arabia, located on the western edge of Wadi al-Batʼha in present-day districts of ad-Dirah and ad-Doho. It emerged from the city-state of Migrin around 1746 when Dahham ibn Dawwas built a governing palace and a wall within it, and ruled as the settlement's chieftain until his overthrow by the First Saudi State in 1773. It was later the center of power of the Second Saudi State for most of 19th century following brief Ottoman presence in the Najd. Abdulaziz ibn Saud recaptured the town in 1902 and made it the base for his 30-year long unification wars that led to the establishment of Saudi Arabia in 1932. The town served as the administrative center of the Saudi government before King Abdulaziz ibn Saud moved his workplace and residence to the Murabba Palace in 1944. In 1950, he instructed the dismantling of the fortifications in order to expand the settlement into a metropolis and the walled town eventually ceased to exist. The area covering the perimeters of the erstwhile town was renamed as the Qasr al-Hukm District in 1973 with the aim of preserving its historical and architectural significance.

== History ==
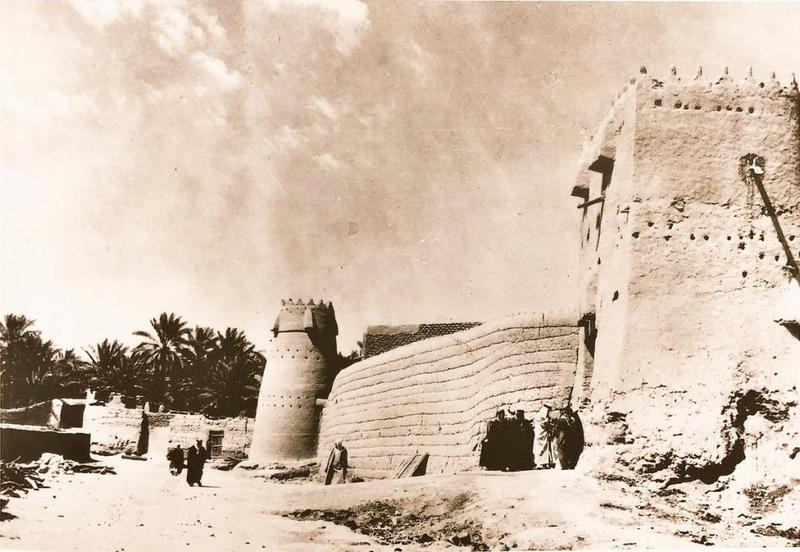
Dakhnah Gate, 1937

The walled town of Riyadh succeeded from the town of Migrin in the 1740s, when Dahham bin Dawwas, a leader from Manfuhah, consolidated his rule by constructing an earth-structured fortified wall that encircled the town and building a palace for himself, which was later known as the al-Hukm Palace. He reigned as the town's chieftain until his overthrow by the forces of Imam Abdulaziz ibn Muhammad, the leader of the First Saudi State.

The town was later occupied by the Ottoman-backed Egyptian forces led by Muhammad Ali Pasha and Ibrahim Pasha when they launched a retaliatory offensive into Najd, pressing hard and subsequently laying siege to Diriyah and vanquishing the First Saudi State in the process in the aftermath of the Najd expedition and Wahhabi War of 1818. In 1824, Turki bin Abdullah al-Saud regained control of Najd and shifted the royal family's center of power to the walled town, in the al-Hukm Palace as the infrastructure in Diriyah was razed to the ground. The House of Saud continued to control the town until the Ha'il-based Rashidi Emirate deposed the royal family in the 1880s. Its last emir, Abdul Rahman bin Faisal al-Saud and his family, were sent to exile and later settled himself in Kuwait.

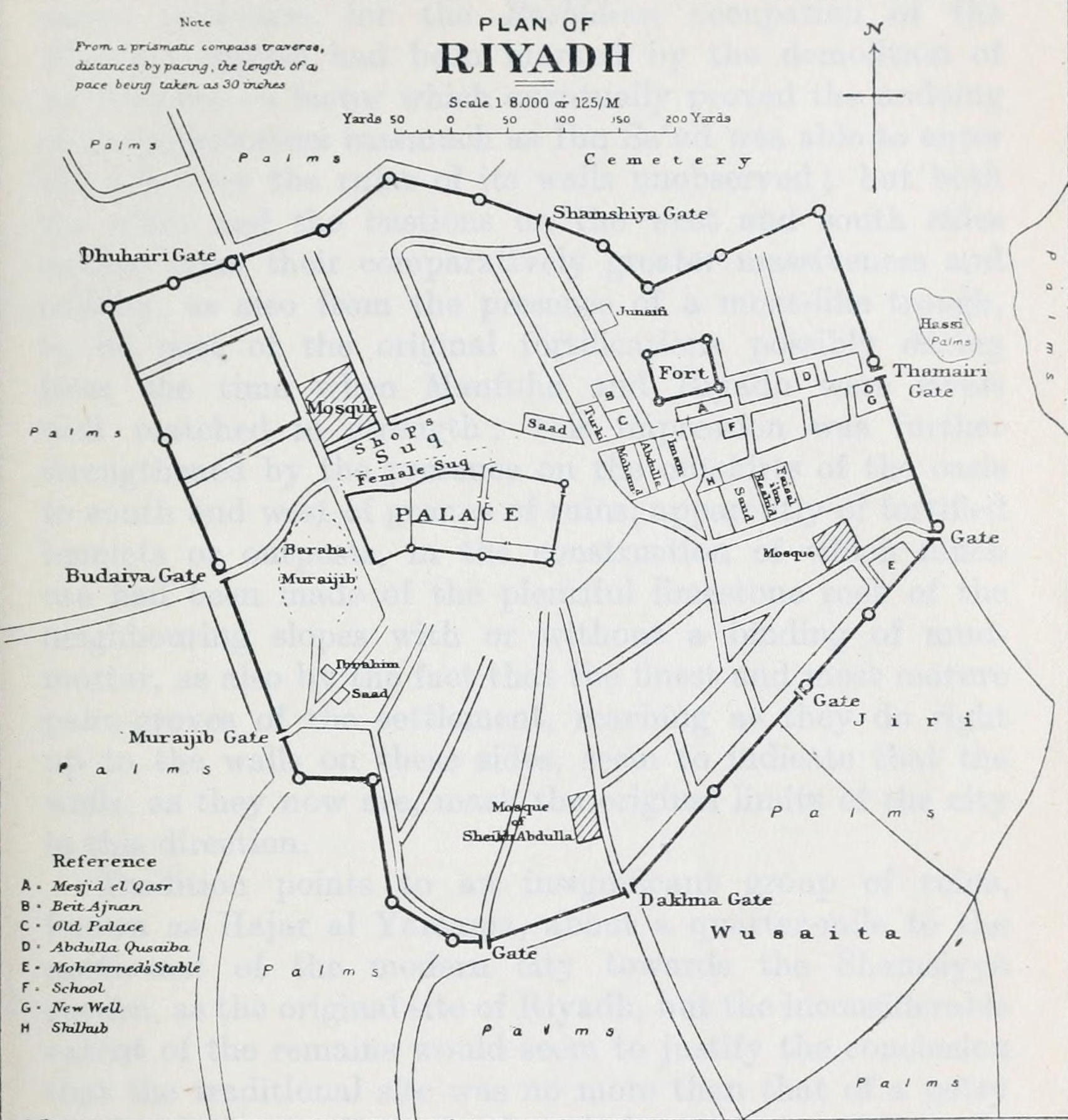
1922 map of Riyadh

Almost ten years later in 1901, Ibn Saud, the son of the exiled emir Abdul Rahman al-Saud, embarked on a raiding spree into Nejd from Kuwait where he began targeting tribes associated with the Rashidis in an attempt to avenge his father's exile. Within months, he was able to capture Riyadh in January 1902 and subsequently establish the Emirate of Riyadh. Ibn Saud would go on to reclaim the territories of his ancestors, launching offensives into Hasa in 1913, Ḥa'il in 1921, Hejaz in 1924, and Yemen in 1934 as part of his unification campaigns and establishing several iterations of the Third Saudi State in the process. In 1932, he renamed his annexes and dependencies by unifying them under the name of Saudi Arabia with Riyadh at its capital.

=== Urbanization around the walled town (1930s–1940s) ===
Ibn Saud's consolidation of power following the takeover of Hejaz brought unprecedented stability to the major settlements within his territory. The defensive fortifications built around various towns to ward off external and internal threats slowly turned out to be redundant. Following the establishment of Saudi Arabia in 1932, Prince Muhammad bin Abdul Rahman al-Saud, the brother of Ibn Saud commissioned the Atiqah Palace, the first building constructed outside the city walls.

Between 1936 and 1938, Ibn Saud built the Murabba Palace out of the walls of Riyadh as the town had started to become unprecedently congested and almost uninhabitable. Ibn Saud restored the Margab Fort in 1936 and also built the Thulaim Palace between 1936 and 1939, that served as one of the quarantine facilities for treating patients during the smallpox epidemic of the 1940s. In the 1930s, Qaṣr al-ʿĀmir Fayṣal bin Saʿad and Qaṣr al-Shamsīyya was built north of the walled town. In 1943, the Red Palace was built for Saud bin Abdulaziz, the first structure erected using reinforced concrete in the history of Saudi Arabia and resulted in the direct development of the Fouta district.

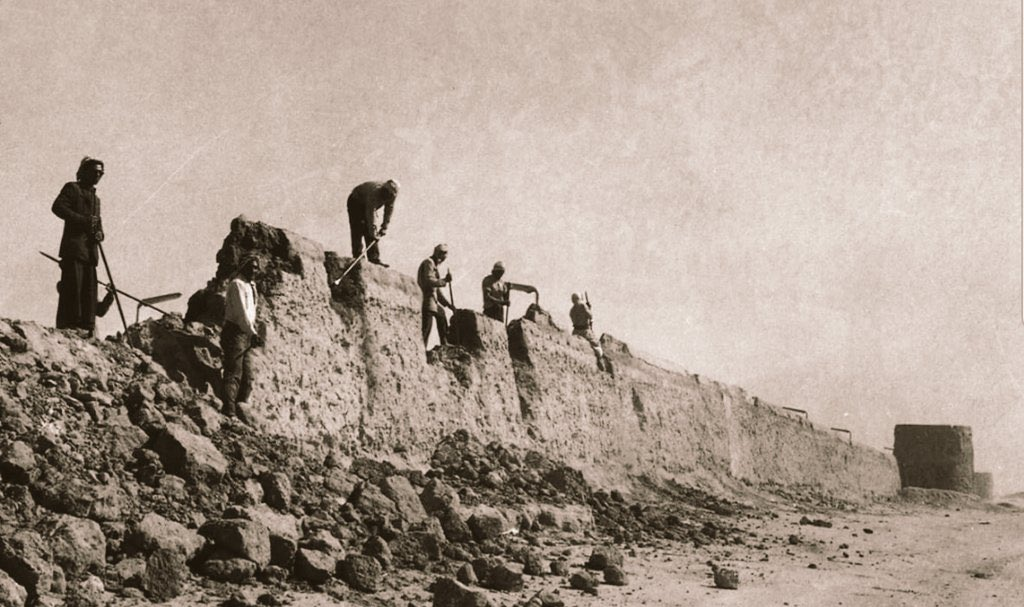
Workers demolishing the city walls in early 1950s

Settlements like Hillat al-Gusman emerged in the 1930s, which was inhabited mostly by traders who came from Qassim. In the 1940s, several Kuwaiti merchants and traders set up an auction market just outside the northeastern fringes of the city walls, that later got evolved into the al-Batʼha commercial area. King Abdulaziz ibn Saud order the construction of palaces for his son, Prince Mansour bin Abdulaziz in the present-day al-Wisham neighborhood. In 1948, Ibn Saud established the Memorial School in the present-day Margab neighborhood, the first public school established in Riyadh to provide formal education to the city's residents.

In early 1950s, upon advice from then governor of Riyadh, Prince Sultan, King Abdulaziz ibn Saud ordered the dismantling of the city walls and the city began to rapidly urbanize in the aftermath, especially between 1950s and 1970s. As a result, several quarters and neighborhoods such as Duhairah and Dakhna were abandoned by its residents in pursuit of better opportunities in the north of the capital metropolis. In 1952, Prince Faisal bin Abdulaziz built the al-Ma'dhar Palace.

=== Rehabilitation and renovation ===
With the demolition of the city walls in the 1950s, surrounding area of the al-Hukm Palace had slowly begun to decline in importance. In March 1973, King Faisal bin Abdulaziz issued directives to Sheikh Abdulaziz Thunayyan, then mayor of Riyadh to conduct an extensive study of the area surrounding the al-Hukm Palace and implementing the project of its renovation the following year. In 1976, the High Commission for the Development of Arriyadh commissioned the Qasr Al-Hukm District Development Project and agreed on developmental programs that were prepared to transform the Qasr al-Hukm District into a cultural center. The designs were completed by 1979 and the construction lasted between 1983 and 1992 in broadly two phases, costing around US$500 million. The project was overseen by Prince Salman bin Abdulaziz, the-then governor of Riyadh and was completed between 1983 and 1992.

== Landmarks ==
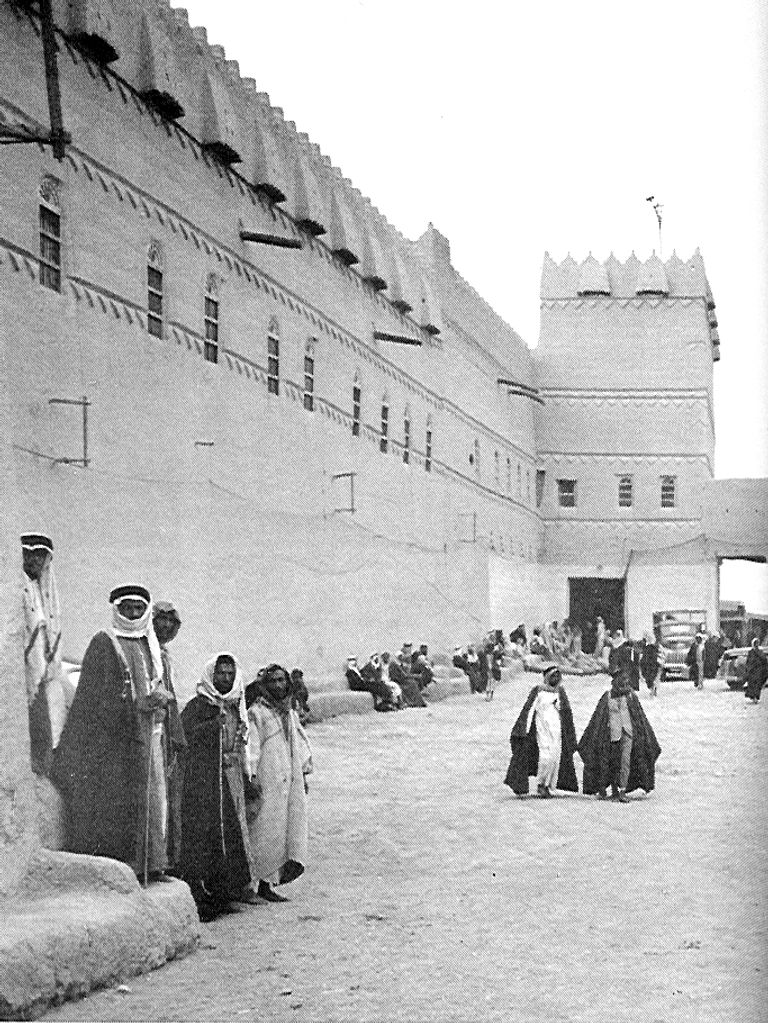
Al-Hukm Palace, 1943

=== Al Hukm Palace ===
Al-Hukm Palace (Arabic: قصر الحكم, romanized: Qaṣr al-Ḥukm, lit. 'Governance Palace'), also known as the al-ʽAdl Palace (Arabic: قصر العدل, romanized: Qaṣr al-ʿAdl, lit. 'Justice Palace'), so called from the public square it overlooks from the south, is a historic palace located directly opposite to Grand Mosque in the erstwhile walled town. It is the de facto site where tribal leaders and members of the Saudi royal family pledge allegiance to the country's political leadership. Built in 1747, it was known as Ibn Dawwas Palace until the 1820s, when Turki bin Abdullah, after gaining control of Najd, shifted the royal family's center of power from Diriyah to the walled town of Riyadh due to the former's severe destruction in a brutal siege during the Ottoman–Wahhabi War of 1818 as well as the town's Ottoman sacking in 1821.

Once the administrative headquarters of the old city within the former walls, it was built by Daham bin Dawwas in 1747 and is the oldest structure in Riyadh that was razed and rebuilt on numerous occasions over the course of time. It was also the official residences of several royals of the first and second Saudi states and today serves as the main office of the governor of Riyadh.

=== Masmak Fort ===
Masmak Fort (Arabic: قصر المصمك) is a clay and mudbrick fort located in close proximity to the al-Hukm Palace in the erstwhile walled town. It was constructed in 1865 and was the main site of the battle for the walled town by Ibn Saud in 1902. It consists of four mudbrick cylindrical watchtowers.

=== Justice Square ===
Justice Square (Arabic: ميدان العدل) or Safa Square (Arabic: ساحة الصفاة) is a public space in the erstwhile walled town, located adjacent to the al-Hukm Palace compound and Grand Mosque. It is known as the historic site of public executions, where those sentenced to death in Saudi Arabia are publicly beheaded.

=== Grand Mosque ===
Grand Mosque (Arabic: الجامع الكبير), is a congregational mosque located adjacent to al-Hukm Palace while overlooking the Justice Square in the erstwhile walled town. It was established in the 1820s during the reign of Turki bin Abdullah bin Muhammad al-Saud, the founder and Imam of the Second Saudi State.

=== Dakhna Grand Mosque ===
Dakhna Grand Mosque is a congregational mosque and an active place of worship located south of Souq al-Zal in the former Dakhna quarter of the erstwhile walled town. It was built in 1773 by Abdullah bin Muhammad bin Abd al-Wahhab and later got evolved into a center of learning for Hanbali Sunni scholars.

== Quarters ==
=== Duhairah ===
Hillat al-Duhairah was a neighborhood and a douar partially within the former city walls. The ruins of the area today constitute a large chunk of ad-Dirah neighborhood. Bordered by al-Suwailem Street to the west and ad-Duhairah Street to the east, most of its residents abandoned the area during Riyadh's multiple phases of expansion and modernization, especially between 1950s and 1970s.

=== Ajnab ===
Hillat Al-Ajnab (Arabic: حلة الأجناب, lit. 'the foreigners' quarter') was a quarter and a douar within the city walls located in the northeastern corner of the walled town. It was situated east of Masmak Fortress, at the entrance of Bab al-Thumairi. The ruins of the settlement today include most of Souq al-Suweigah in the ad-Dirah neighborhood and its name was derived from al-ājānib (Arabic: الأَجانِب), the Arabic word for outsiders as most of its residents where foreigners who were given accommodation as guests or advisors of King Abdulaziz ibn Saud, such as John Philby and Muhammad Asad.

=== Gadimah ===
Hillat al-Gadimah (Arabic: حلة القديمة, lit. 'old quarter'), originally known as Hayy al-Aamir (Arabic: حي عامر), was a settlement and a douar within the city walls, located in the southeastern corner of the walled town. It was built on a farm owned by a farmer named Ibn Issa and was later incorporated into the capital metropolis of Riyadh following the dismantling of the city walls in 1950. The quarter hosted the al-Hilla Mosque.

=== Mugailiyah ===
Hillat al-Mugailiyah (Arabic: حلة المعيقلية) was a residential quarter and a douar within the city walls, located west of Duhairah in the northwestern corner of the walled town. It contained the sub-quarter of Hillat al-Ata'if (Arabic: حلة العطايف) and al-Muʼeiqiliah Mosque, al-Ata'if Mosque as well as Ibn Suleiman School. The douar ceased to exist in the aftermath of the demolition of city walls in 1950 and subsequent expansion of Riyadh into a metropolis between the 1950s and 1970s. It is today largely situated on the site of Souq al-Maigliah in the ad-Dirah neighborhood.

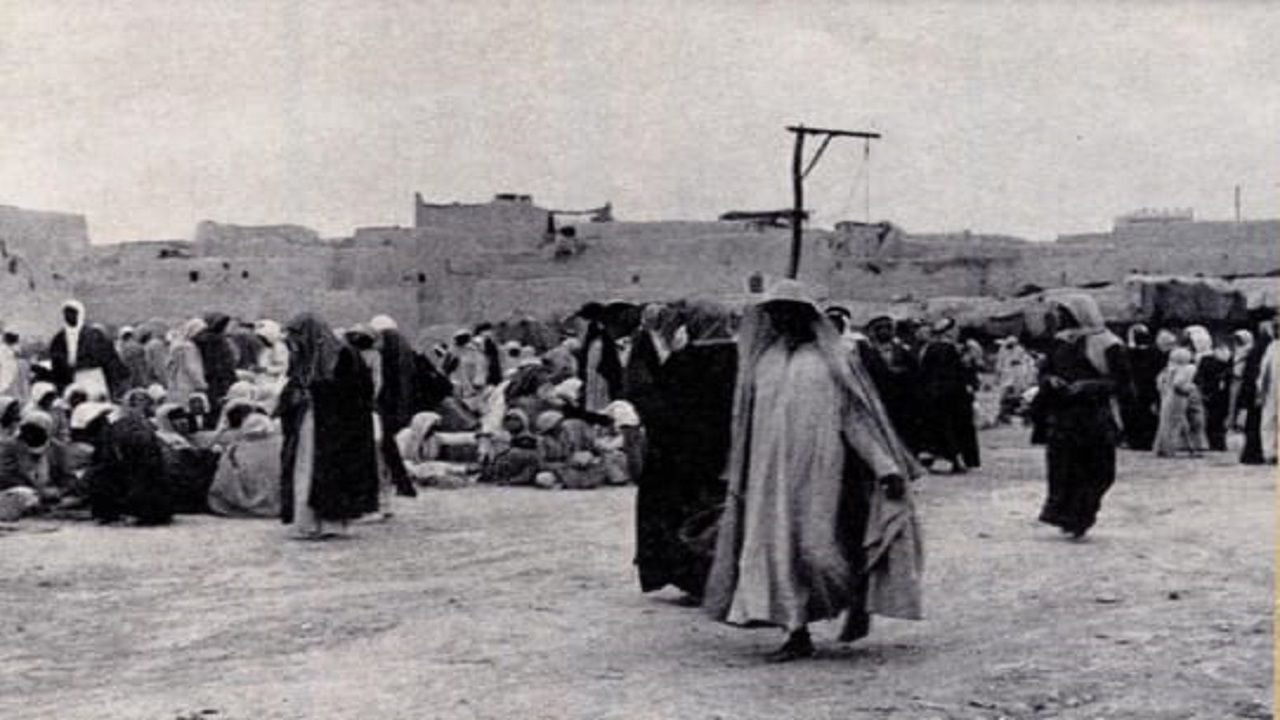
Souq al-Mughaibrah, 1943

=== Muraighib ===
Hillat al-Muraighib (Arabic: حلة المريقب) was a quarter and a douar within the city walls, located in the southwestern corner of the walled town. It contained the sub-quarter of Hillat al-Mughaibrah (Arabic: حلة المقيبرة, lit. 'the graveyard quarter'), which mostly included a cemetery and an eponymous souq. The al-Mughaibrah sub-quarter hosted one of the two cemeteries that catered the needs of the town's inhabitants, other being Shalaga. It hosted the Muraighib School and Muraighib Mosque.

=== Al Ghanaiy ===
Hillat al-Ghanaiy (Arabic: حلة القناعي) was a quarter and a douar within the city walls located between Mugailiyah and Muraighib in the northwestern part of the walled town. The quarter was attributed to the family of al-Qanaiʼy, who owned the land in the area and hosted two small markets, Qaisiriya Ibn Qulaib (later Souq al-Ushaiger) and Qaisiriya Prince Saad bin Abdullah.

=== Al Sharqiyah ===
Hillat Al Sharqiyah (Arabic: حلة الشرقية, lit. 'the eastern quarter') was a quarter and a douar within the city walls, located west of Dakhna and east of Muraighib in the southwestern part of the walled town. It included the Sharqiyah Mosque, Khalid bin Saud Mosque, Souq Sidrah and al-Jufrah Mosque.

=== Dakhna ===
Hillat al-Dakhna (Arabic: حلة دخنة), alternatively transliterated as Dekhna or Dukhnah, was a quarter and a douar within the former city walls, located west of al-Gadimah and south of al-Duhairah in southern part of the walled town. The quarter contained the 18th century Dakhna Grand Mosque, due to which it was nicknamed as Hayy al-ʿUlamāʾ (Arabic: حي العلماء, lit. 'neighborhood of the scholars') and was located in close proximity to the Dakhna Gate. It was a prominent settlement and a major commercial center until the early 1960s and was incorporated into the metropolis of Riyadh between the 1950s and 1970s.

It was named after Dakhna well and was itself attributed to a tribe from Asir named Bani Sharif. In 1773, following the House of Saud-led takeover of the walled town, Abdullah bin Muhammad bin Abd al-Wahhab built a mosque in the area, which later became a center of learning for Hanbali Sunni scholars and was dubbed as Hayy al-Ulama.

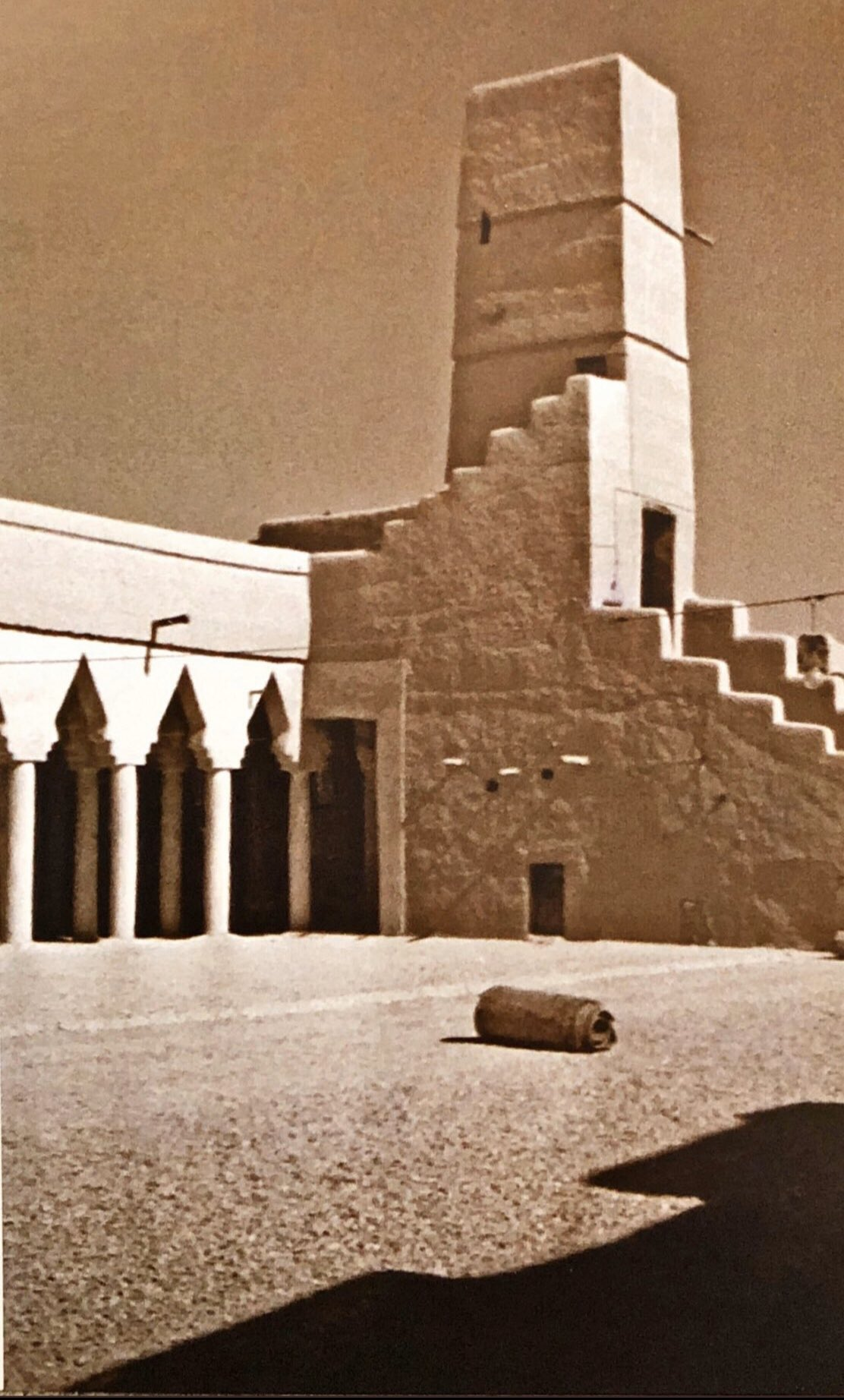
Dakhna Grand Mosque, 1952

=== Doho ===
Al-Doho (Arabic: حي الدحو), formerly Haara al-Hilla (Arabic: حارة الحلة) and alternatively transliterated as al-Daho or al-Dahu, is a historic neighborhood situated within the former old city walls in the southernmost part of the walled town. It is the only quarter that survived following the dismantling of the city walls in 1950.
