= Al-Sheikh (surname) =

Al-Sheikh or Al-Shaykh (Arabic: الشيخ) is an Arabic surname. Notable people with the surname include:

- Abdullah bin Muhammad Al Sheikh (1751–1829), Muslim scholar
- Abdulaziz Al Sheikh (born 1940), Saudi Arabian scholar
- Ali Jawad al-Sheikh (1997–2011), Bahraini child killed during the Bahraini uprising
- Ali Mahmud al-Shaykh (1901–1961), Iraqi politician
- Faiq Al Sheikh Ali (born 1963), Iraqi lawyer and politician
- Hamad bin Mohammed Al Al-Sheikh, Saudi Arabian politician, minister of education
- Hanan al-Shaykh (born 1945), Lebanese author
- Hashim al-Sheikh, Syrian rebel commander
- Hassouneh Al-Sheikh (born 1977), Jordanian footballer
- Hussain Al-Sheikh (born 1990), Saudi Arabian footballer
- Hussein al-Sheikh (politician) (born 1960), Palestinian politician
- Jahad Abdullah Al-Sheikh (born 1972), Omani sprinter
- Mohammed al-Shaykh (1490–1557), first sultan of the Saadian dynasty of Morocco
- Mustafa Al-Sheikh, Syrian military officer and rebel commander
- Radwan Al-Sheikh Hassan, Syrian footballer
- Saleh Al Sheikh (born 1982), Kuwaiti footballer
- Salman Hamad Al-Sheikh (born 1968), Bahraini soldier and politician
- Shawqi al-Shaykh, Egyptian Islamist
- Suleiman bin Abdullah Al Sheikh (1785–1818), religious scholar in the Emirate of Diriyah
- Tarfa bint Abdullah Al Sheikh (1884–1906), Saudi Arabian royal
- Zahid Al-Sheikh, brother of terrorist Khalid Sheikh Mohammad

== See also ==
- Ibn al-Sheikh
