= Riyadh Public Library =

Library in Saudi Arabia

Riyadh Public Library, Saudi Arabia (Maktabah al-'āmah al-sa'ūdīyah, Arabic مكتبة الرياض العامة السعودية) is a library established during the reign of King Abdulaziz Ibn Saud next to the mosque currently known as the Sheikh Muhammad bin Ibrahim Mosque, about 400 m south of the Al Hukm Palace and al-Safat square in Riyadh. The library was established in 1950. Set in the Dakhna neighborhood, known as a centre of learning since at least the 18th century CE, it was constructed near the Riyadh Scientific Institute, which opened in 1370 (CE 1950) and the College of Sharia, which opened in 1373 (CE 1953).

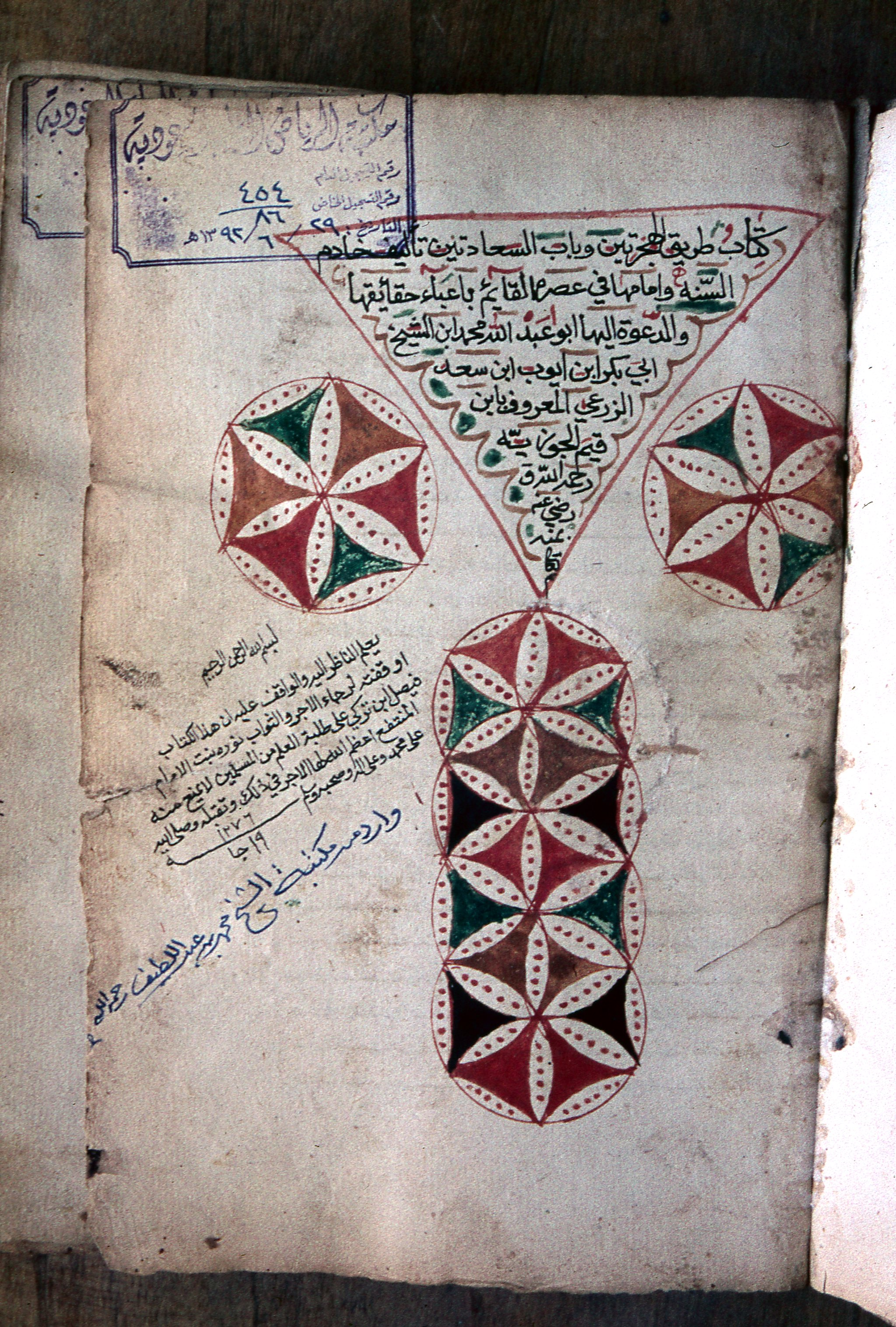
Copy of a treatise by Ibn Qayyim al-Jawziyya, طريق الهجرتين وباب السعادتين, colophon, dated 1276 (1859-60 CE). This manuscript was given as a waqf by Sheikh Muhammad Abdul Latif and carries his seal.

The library was associated with Sheikh Muhammad bin Ibrahim after its founding and the collection was enhanced by gifts from him. Attempts were made to fill shortages by purchasing abroad, the first curator being sent to Egypt to collect materials, while one of the early directors took advantage of his travel to Lebanon to bring books and to cultivate the receipt of gifts. In addition to printed materials, the library assembled a collection of 882 manuscripts.

Notable among the manuscripts are a copy of Names and Attributes by Al-Bayhaqi, written in 585 (1189 CE) and Investigation of the Hadiths of Commentary by Ibn al-Jawzi, an old copy belonging to about the 13th century. Also of note is Al-Ahkam Al-Sultaniyya of Al-Mawardi, the copy made in the 682 AH (1283 CE). The majority of manuscripts were, however, sourced locally from sheikhs and scholars. The manuscript collection has been transferred to the King Fahad National Library.

== See also ==
- Libraries in Saudi Arabia
