= Al Ajnab =

Extinct settlement in southern Riyadh, Saudi Arabia

Al-Ajnab الأجناب
- Neighbourhood
- Al-Ajnab, 1974
- Interactive map of Al-Ajnab
- Coordinates: 24°37′54″N 46°42′52″E
- Country: Saudi Arabia
- City: Riyadh
- Region: Old Riyadh

Language
  - Official: Arabic

Hillat al-Ajnab (Arabic: حلة الأجناب, lit. 'the foreigners' quarter') was a quarter and a douar within the city walls in the erstwhile fortress-city of Riyadh, Saudi Arabia, located in the northeastern corner of the walled town. It was situated east of Masmak Fortress, at the entrance of Bab al-Thumairi. The ruins of the settlement today include most of Souq al-Suweigah in the ad-Dirah neighborhood and its name was derived from al-ājānib (Arabic: الأَجانِب), the Arabic word for outsiders as most of its residents where foreigners who were given accommodation as guests or advisors of King Abdulaziz ibn Saud, such as John Philby and Muhammad Asad.

The settlement shared close proximity with the Duhairah settlement from the east and al-Gadimah settlement from the south and following the dismantling of the city walls and subsequent expansion and modernization of Riyadh in the 1970s, the settlement evolved into Souq al-Suweigah and assumed most of its current form during the Qasr Al-Hukm District Development Project between 1983 and 1992.

The settlement once hosted a garage that belonged to the future monarch of Saudi Arabia, Saud bin Abdulaziz and also hosted the residence of Princess Noura bint Abdul Rahman al-Saud, elder sister and adviser of King Abdulaziz ibn Saud and the eldest daughter of Abdul Rahman bin Faisal al-Saud, the last emir of the Second Saudi State.
