= Hillat Al Sharqiyah =

Al Sharqiyah الشرقية
- Neighbourhood
- Interactive map of Al Sharqiyah
- Coordinates: 24°37′34″N 46°42′36″E
- Country: Saudi Arabia
- City: Riyadh
- Region: Old Riyadh

Language
  - Official: Arabic

Hillat Al-Sharqiyah (Arabic: حلة الشرقية, lit. 'the eastern quarter') was a quarter and a douar within the city walls in the erstwhile fortress-city of Riyadh, Saudi Arabia, located west of Dakhna and east of Muraighib in the southwestern part of the walled town. It included the Sharqiyah Mosque, Khalid bin Saud Mosque, Souq Sidrah and al-Jufrah Mosque.

Al-Sharqiyah was named after an old well owned by a family named al-Dhafran and was bounded by Dakhna Street to the east, al-Muraighib Street to the west and al-Hukm Palace to the north.
