= Shalaga cemetery =

Historic cemetery in Riyadh, Saudi Arabia

- Interactive map of Shalaga cemetery

Details
- Established: 19th century
- Location: Ad-Dirah, Riyadh
- Country: Saudi Arabia
- Coordinates: 24°38′1″N 46°42′48″E
- Type: Muslim
- Owned by: Riyadh Municipality

Shalaga cemetery (Arabic: مقبرة شلقا), is a public cemetery and a historic burial ground in the ad-Dirah neighborhood of Riyadh, Saudi Arabia. It was one of the two main graveyards used by the inhabitants of the old walled town, the other being al-Mughaibrah and was situated outside of the city fortifications in the northeast. The cemetery is the resting place of Turki bin Abdullah al-Saud, leader of the Second Saudi State from 1824 to 1834.
