= Hilla Mosque =

Mosque in ad-Doho, Riyadh, Saudi Arabia

- مسجد الحلة
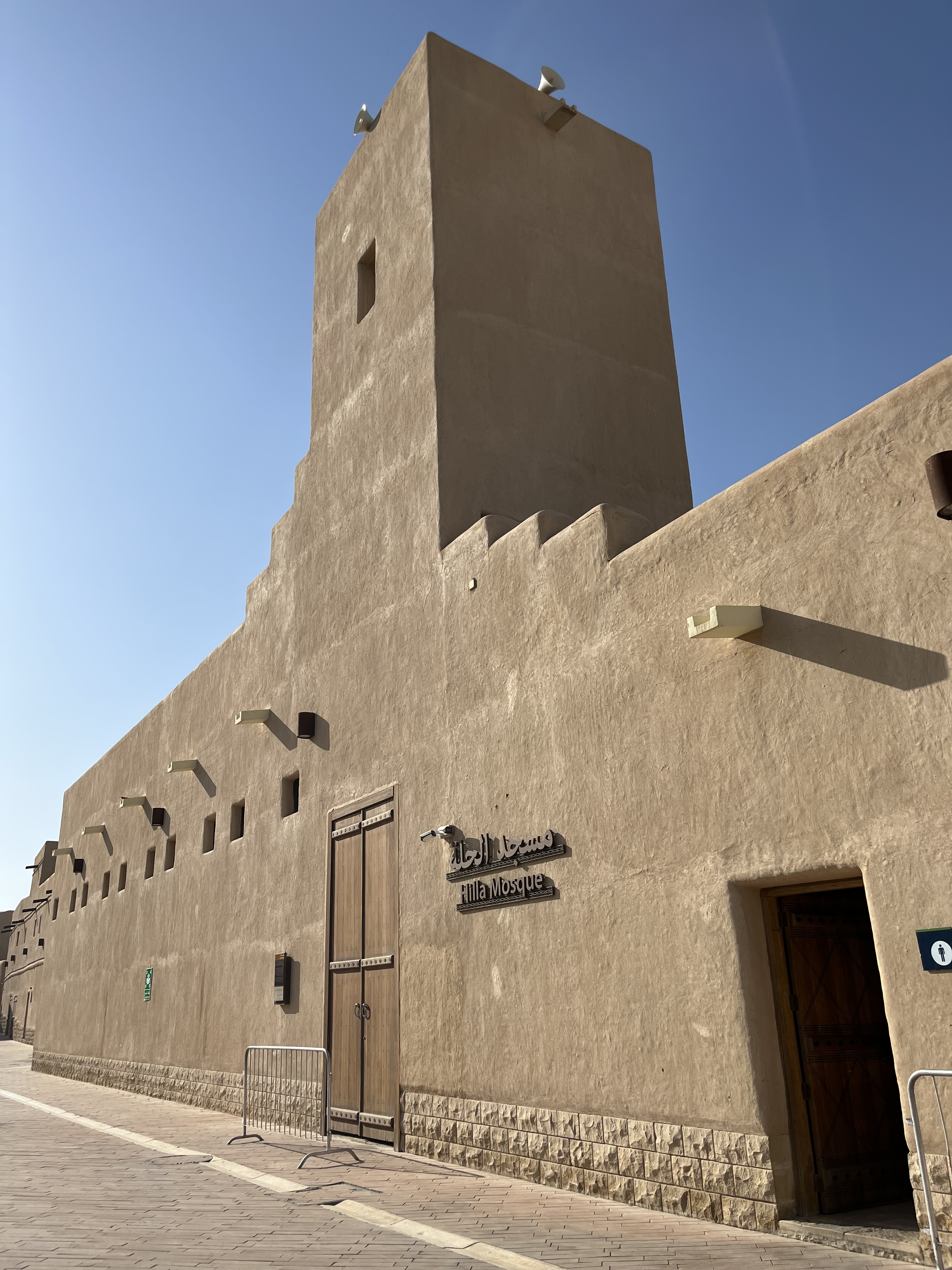
- Hilla Mosque, 2026

Religion
- Affiliation: Sunni Islam

Location
- Location: Riyadh, Saudi Arabia
- Municipality: Al-Bat’ha
- Interactive map of Hilla Mosque
- Coordinates: 24°37′45.9084″N 46°42′53.856″E

Architecture
- Established: 19th century (original); 1960s (restored)
- Minaret: 1

Hilla Mosque (Arabic: مسجد الحلة) is a historic mosque in the ad-Doho district of Riyadh, Saudi Arabia, located in the erstwhile al-Gadimah quarter. The mosque was constructed in the 19th century during the reign of Imam Turki bin Abdullah and was later restored in the 20th century by King Abdulaziz ibn Saud before being rebuilt in the 1960s using modern techniques. The mosque was one of the centers of learning for Hanbali Sunni scholars.

== Overview ==
The mosque was built in the Second Saudi State in 19th century during the reign of Imam Turki bin Abdullah. The mosque was restored in early 20th century by King Abdulaziz ibn Saud and appointed Abdul Rahman ibn Abdul Latif Al ash-Sheikh (1871–1947) as its imam, who served in his position until 1931. The mosque is located in the modern-day ad-Doho district of Riyadh, Saudi Arabia, and is considered to be one of the earliest mosques of Riyadh and one of the centers of learning for Hanbali Sunni scholars. The mosque was rebuilt in the 1960s by the Saudi government using modern techniques.

== See also ==
- Islam in Saudi Arabia
- List of mosques in Saudi Arabia
