= Ghanaiy =

Al-Ghanaiy القناعي
- Neighbourhood
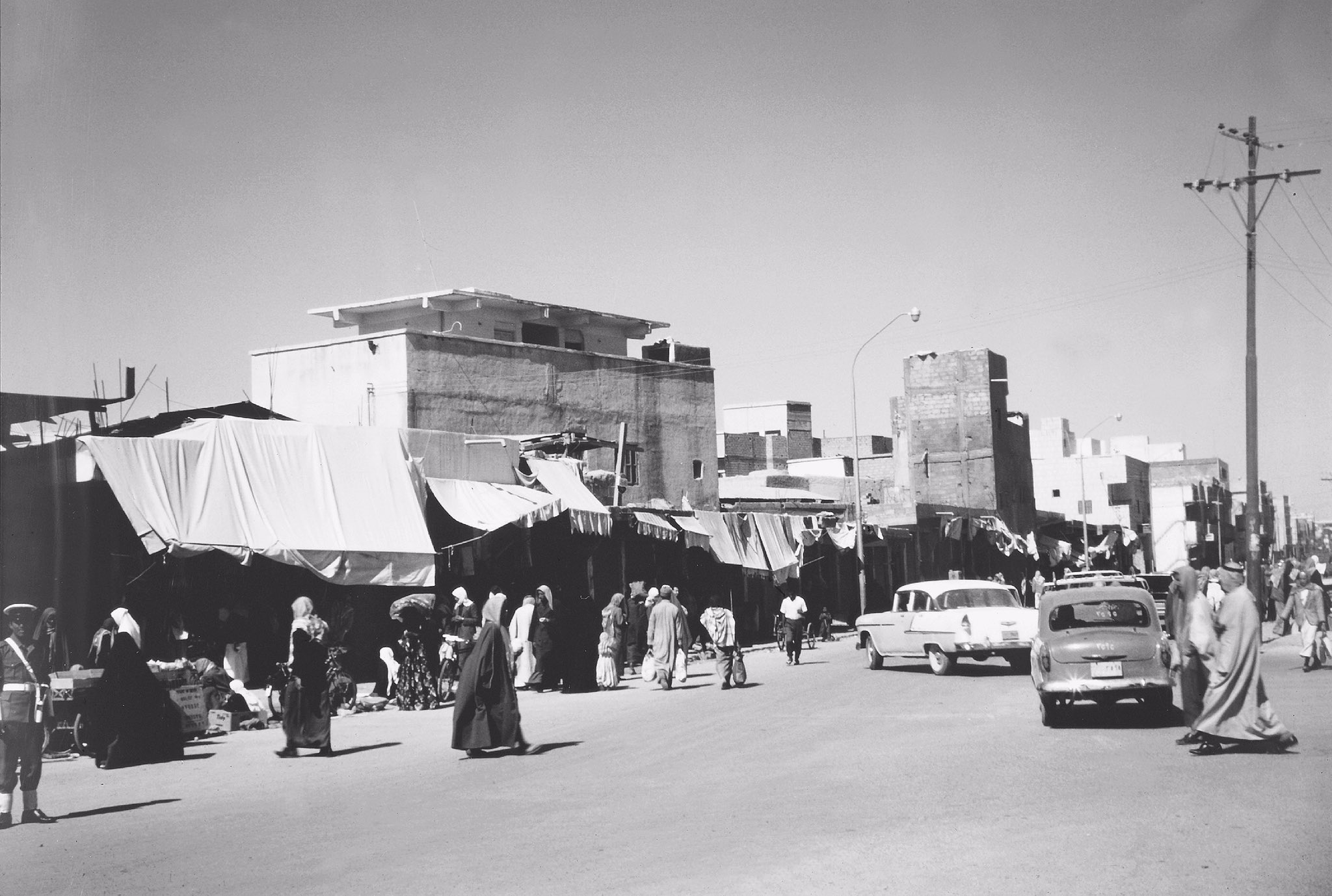
- Qaisiriya Ibn Qulaib, 1965
- Interactive map of Al-Ghanaiy
- Coordinates: 24°37′46″N 46°42′50″E
- Country: Saudi Arabia
- City: Riyadh
- Region: Old Riyadh
- Named for: al-Qanaiʼy family

Language
  - Official: Arabic

Al-Quna’i (Arabic: حلة القناعي), or in Najdi vernacular pronunciation as al-Ghanaiy, was a quarter and a douar within the city walls in the erstwhile fortress-city of Riyadh, Saudi Arabia, located between Mugailiyah and Muraighib in the northwestern part of the walled town.

The quarter was attributed to the family of al-Qanaiʼy, who owned the land in the area and hosted two small markets, Qaisiriya Ibn Qulaib (later Souq al-Ushaiger) and Qaisiriya Prince Saad bin Abdullah.
