= Al-Sheikh =

Al-Sheikh or Al-Shaykh (Arabic: الشيخ) may refer to:

- Al ash-Sheikh, Saudi clan
- Al-Sheikh (surname)
- Wadi al-Sheikh
- Tell al-Sheikh
- Dayr al-Shaykh
