= Dakhna (Riyadh) =

Extinct douar in Riyadh, Saudi Arabia

Dakhna دخنة
- Neighbourhood
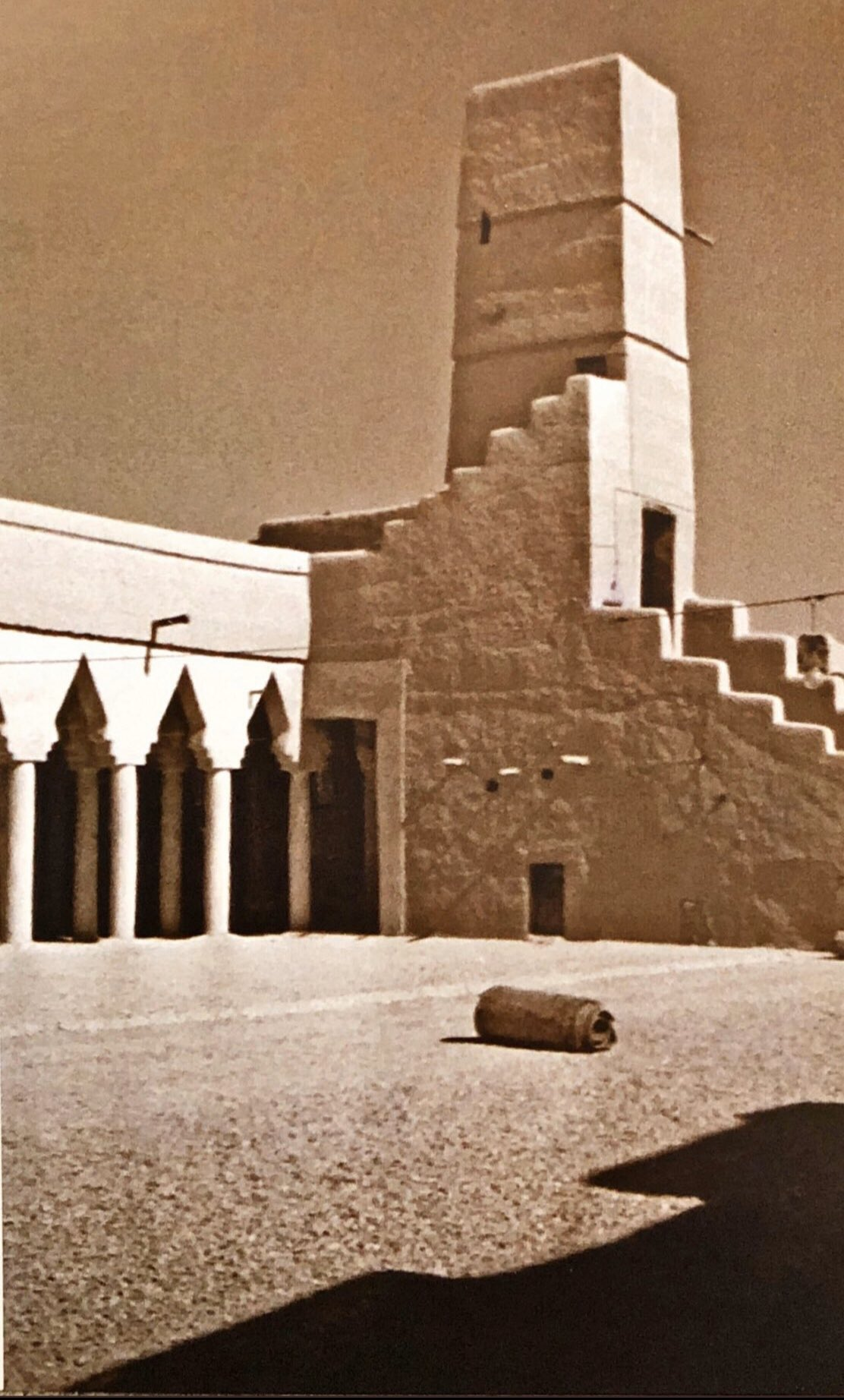
- Dakhna Grand Mosque, 1952
- Interactive map of Dakhna
- Coordinates: 24°37′46″N 46°42′50″E
- Country: Saudi Arabia
- City: Riyadh
- Region: Old Riyadh
- Incorporated into metropolis: 1960s
- Named for: Dakhna well

Language
  - Official: Arabic

Hillat al-Dakhna (Arabic: حلة دخنة), alternatively transliterated as Dekhna or Dukhnah, was a quarter and a douar within the former city walls in southern Riyadh, Saudi Arabia, located west of al-Gadimah and south of al-Duhairah in southern part of the walled town. The quarter contained the 18th century Dakhna Grand Mosque, due to which it was nicknamed as Hayy al-ʿUlamāʾ (Arabic: حي العلماء, lit. 'neighborhood of the scholars') and was located near the Dakhnah Gate. It was a prominent settlement and a major commercial center until the early 1960s and was incorporated into the metropolis of Riyadh between the 1950s and 1970s.

It was named after Dakhna well which was itself attributed to a tribe from Asir named Bani Sharif. In 1773, following the House of Saud-led takeover of the walled town, Abdullah bin Muhammad bin Abd al-Wahhab built a mosque in the area, which later became a center of learning for Hanbali Sunni scholars and was dubbed as Hayy al-Ulama.

The quarter hosted the residences of Sheikh Mohammad bin Ibrahim Al Asheikh, Sheikh Abdullah bin Abdulateef Al Asheikh, Abdulaziz ibn Saud, Saleh bin Abdulaziz Al Asheikh, Prince Abdullah bin Abdulaziz, Prince Fahd bin Abdulaziz as well as palaces of mother of Prince Fahd bin Saud bin Abdulaziz, Prince Saad bin Abdulaziz, Prince Badr bin Abdulaziz and Prince Faisal bin Saud bin Abdulaziz.

== Legacy ==
In 2021, the Dukhnaah Restaurant was opened in Boulevard City in Riyadh that offers culinary traditions from Najd and was named after the erstwhile quarter of the walled town.
