= Riyadh city fortifications =

Fortified wall which once encircled the old city of Riyadh

Riyadh city wall
- سور مدينة الرياض
- Part of Old Riyadh
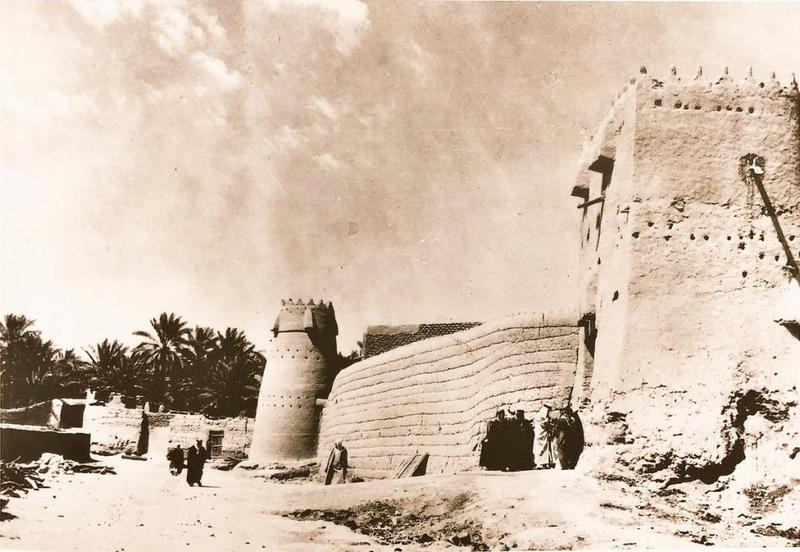
- Dakhnah Gate of the old city walls, 1937

Site information
- Type: Series of earth-structured defensive fortifications
- Condition: Partially restored

Site history
- Built: 1740s
- Built by: Dahham ibn Dawwas
- In use: 1950s
- Materials: Mud-brick
- Fate: demolished

The Riyadh city fortifications (Arabic: سور مدينة الرياض, romanized: Sūr madīnat ar-Riyāḍ) were series of earth-structured defensive walls with watchtowers and gates that encircled the walled town of Riyadh, in modern-day Riyadh, Saudi Arabia intermittently from 1740s until they were finally demolished in the 1950s. Subsequently, Riyadh outgrew as a metropolis and the area covering the perimeters of the walled town was renamed as the Qasr al-Hukm District in 1973. The town within the walls served as the administrative center of the Saudi government until 1944, when King Abdulaziz ibn Saud shifted his workplace and residence to the Murabba Palace.

== Overview ==
The early origins of the wall dated back to the 18th century during the reign of Riyadh's ruler Daham bin Dawas al-Shaalan and was razed and rebuilt on numerous occasions over the course of time. The wall was renovated for the last time by Ibn Saud soon after the Battle of Riyadh in 1902, before it was finally demolished in 1950 to pave the way for the city's expansion. The wall had 9 gates, which were known as darawiz (Arabic: الدراويز, romanized: al-darāwiz), the plural Arabized form of the Persian word darwazah (Persian: دروازه, romanized: darvâze), meaning gateway.

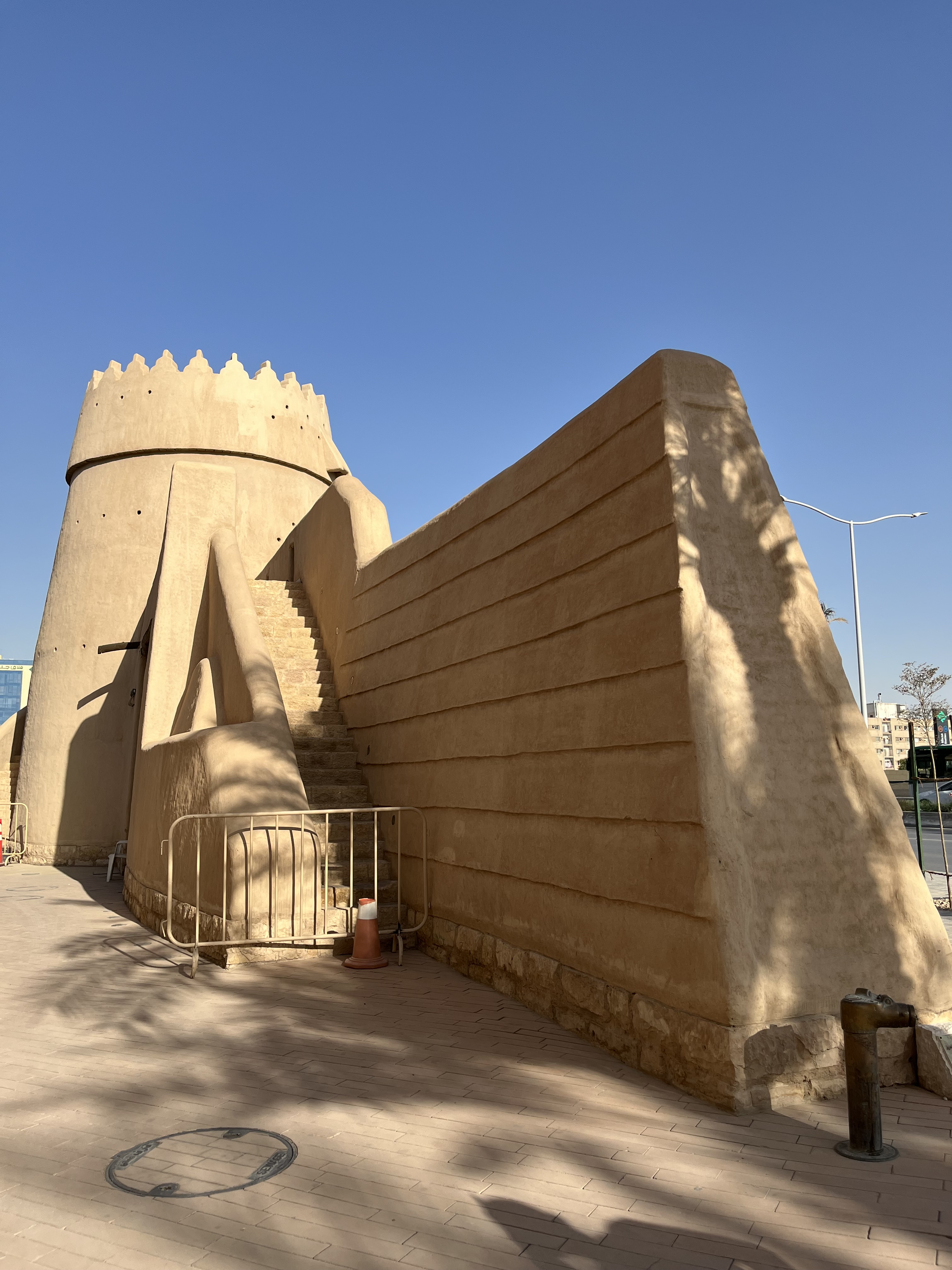
Remains of the city wall in the ad-Doho neighborhood of Qasr al-Hukm District, 2026

== History ==
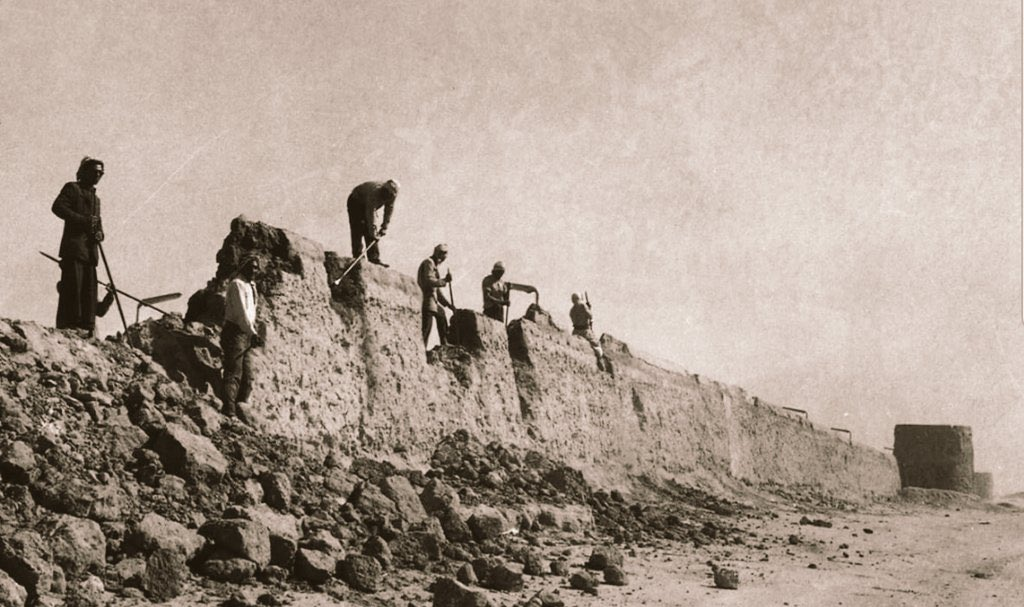
Workers demolishing the city walls around early 1950s

Historical accounts largely credit Riyadh's 18th-century ruler Daham bin Dawas al-Shalaan for being the first one to erect a wall around Riyadh in around 1740s. After expelling the Ottoman-backed Egyptian forces from Najd and reinstating the Second Saudi State in 1824, Imam Turki al-Saud ordered the reconstruction of Daham's walls. However, after the victory of the Rashidi dynasty in the Battle of Mulayda against the House of Saud in 1891, the new ruler of Najd Ibn Rashid went on to desecrate and destroy much of al-Saud's structures, including the Riyadh wall. After Ibn Saud deposed the Rashidis in 1902 after the Battle of Riyadh, he ordered the rehabilitation of the wall in order to safeguard the city from trespassers and invaders. In the 1950s, upon advice from then governor of Riyadh Prince Sultan, King Abdulaziz ibn Saud ordered the demolition of the city walls to proceed with the city's modernization and expansion. In 1932, Ibn Saud established the Kingdom of Saudi Arabia and declared Riyadh to be the capital of the country. The walled town remained as the administrative center until 1944, when Ibn Saud shifted to Murabba Palace and made it his new official workplace.

== Gates ==
The Riyadh city wall had around 10 gates and 20 watchtowers.

- Al-Thumairi Gate
- Al-Guraiy Gate
- Al-Musada Gate
- Al-Badiah Gate (Al-Madhbah Gate)
- Al-Suwailem Gate
- Al-Duhaira Gate (Al-Shamsiyyah Gate)
- Dakhna Gate (Darwaza al-Kabirah)
- Al-Arair Gate
- Al-Muraighib Gate (Shumaisi Gate)

== Quarters and landmarks that fell within the walls ==
The following were within the walls:

- Al-Duhairah quarter
- Al-Daho quarter
- Al-Ajnab quarter
- Al-Gadimah quarter
- Qasr al-Hukm
- Masmak citadel
- The Grand Mosque
- Dakhna Grand Mosque
- al-Mugailiyah quarter
- Al-Muraighib quarter
- Al-Ghanaiy quarter
- Sharqiya quarter
- Dakhna quarter
