= Sheikh Muhammad bin Ibrahim Mosque =

Historic mosque in Riyadh, Saudi Arabia

- Arabic: مسجد الشيخ محمد بن إبراهيم
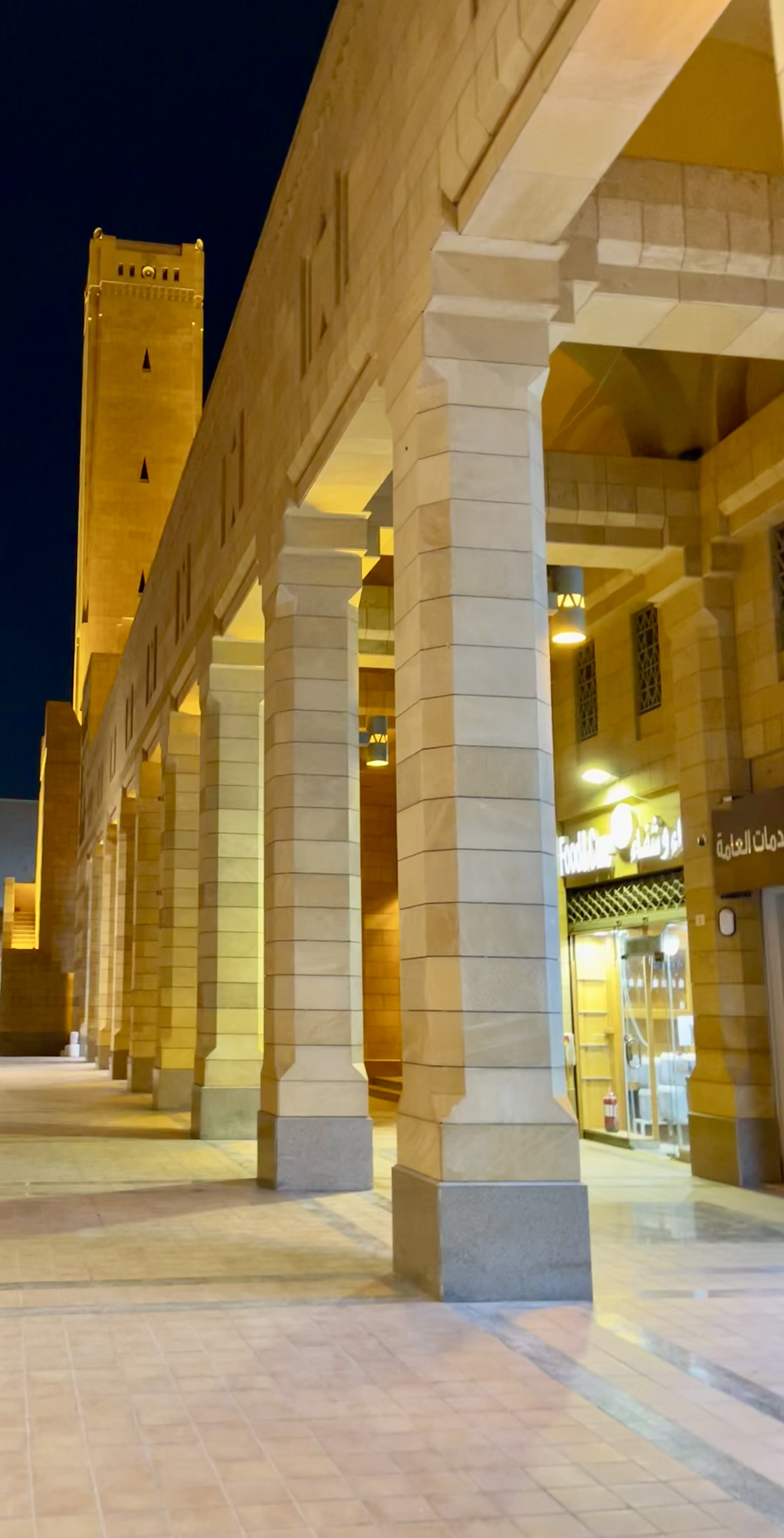
- The mosque, in 2024

- Location of the mosque in Saudi Arabia

Religion
- Affiliation: Sunni Islam
- Ecclesiastical or organizational status: Mosque
- Status: Active

Location
- Location: Riyadh, Al Batʼha
- Country: Saudi Arabia
- Interactive map of Sheikh Muhammad bin Ibrahim Mosque
- Coordinates: 24°37′39″N 46°42′44″E

Architecture
- Type: Mosque architecture
- Style: Modern Najdi
- Founder: Abdullah bin Muhammad Al Sheikh
- Completed: 1773 (original); 2005 (restored)

Specifications
- Capacity: 1,800 worshippers
- Minaret: 1

Sheikh Muhammad bin Ibrahim Mosque (Arabic: مسجد الشيخ محمد بن إبراهيم) is a historic mosque in the ad-Dirah neighborhood of Riyadh, Saudi Arabia, located south of Souq al-Zal in the Qasr al-Hukm District. It was established in 1773 by Abdullah bin Muhammad Al Sheikh as the Dakhna Grand Mosque (Arabic: مسجد دخنة الكبير) in the Dakhna quarter of the former walled town and later got evolved into a center of learning for Hanbali Sunni scholars. Named after Muhammad ibn Ibrahim Al ash-Sheikh, it is one of the oldest existing mosques in Riyadh and was demolished and rebuilt on numerous occasions throughout the 20th century, with the latest renovation having taken place in the period 2001–2005 during the third phase of the Qasr Al Hukm District Development Project.

== History ==
The mosque was first built by Abdullah bin Muhammad bin Abd al-Wahhab in 1773 soon after Imam Abdulaziz ibn Muhammad's takeover of the walled town of Riyadh from Dahham bin Dawwas. The mosque later became a center of learning for religious and scientific studies in the Dakhna quarter, that led to the quarter being nicknamed as Hayy al-Ulema (transl. neighborhood of the scholars). The mosque was renovated and rehabilitated in 1942, 1962 and 1983.

It was named Dakhna Grand Mosque to distinguish itself with the Dakhna Small Mosque. During the reign of King Abdulaziz ibn Saud, he appointed Muhammad ibn Ibrahim ash-Sheikh as the imam of the mosque following the death of Abd Allah ibn Abd al-Latif Al ash-Sheikh in 1921, who later became the first Grand Mufti of Saudi Arabia in 1953 while retaining his position as the imam of the mosque until his death in 1969.

In January 2001, Crown Prince Abdullah bin Abdulaziz directed the authorities to expand and rebuild the mosque. It renovation was overseen by the Royal Commission for Riyadh City under Prince Salman bin Abdulaziz and was inaugurated in December 2005.

== Gallery ==
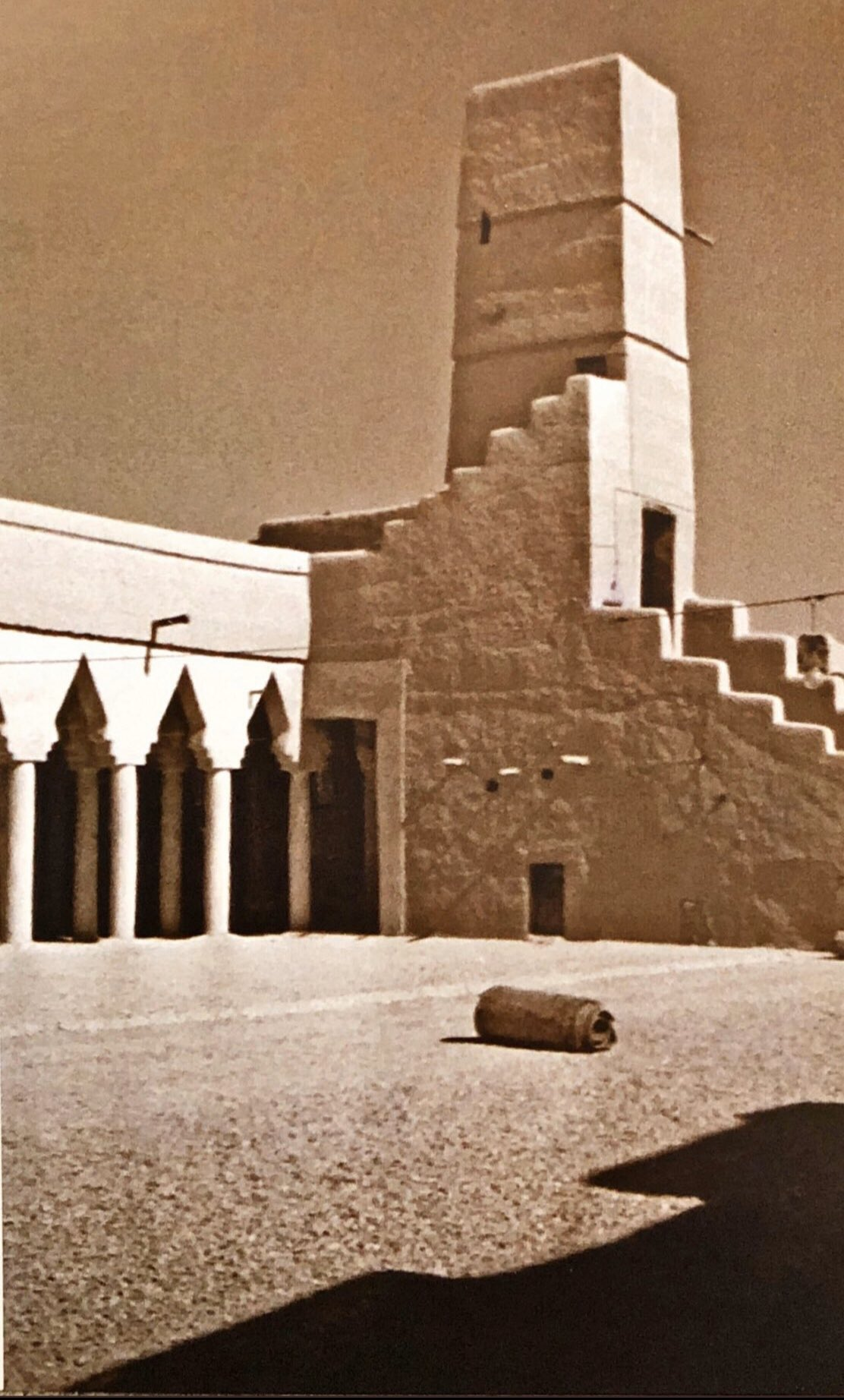
Dakhna Grand Mosque, 1952

== See also ==
- Islam in Saudi Arabia
- List of mosques in Saudi Arabia
