= Sara bint Abdulaziz Al Saud =

Saudi royal (1916–2002)

- Born: 1916; Riyadh
- Died: 2002 (aged 85–86); Riyadh, Saudi Arabia
- Spouse: Faisal bin Saad bin Abdul Rahman Al Saud
Names
- Sara bint Abdulaziz bin Abdul Rahman Al Saud
- House: Al Saud
- Father: King Abdulaziz
- Mother: Lajah bint Khalid bin Faisal Al Hithlain

Sara bint Abdulaziz Al Saud (Arabic: سارة بنت عبد العزيز آل سعود; 1916–2002) was one of the most prominent daughters of King Abdulaziz, the founder of modern Saudi Arabia.

== Early life ==
Sara was born in Riyadh to King Abdulaziz Ibn Saud and Lajah bint Khalid bin Faisal Al Hithlain.

== Personal life ==
Sara was married to Fayṣal bin Sa'ad, son of her paternal uncle Saad bin Abdul Rahman. Princess Sara and Prince Fayṣal had two children, Nurra and Hussa. Sara's main residence was Qaṣr al-ʿĀmir Fayṣal bin Saʿad.

== Influence ==
Princess Sara was of high societal influence. She would host weekly family gatherings at her home for her father, King Abdulaziz, and her siblings.
