= Dakhnah Gate =

Dakhna Gate
- بوابة دخنة (Arabic)
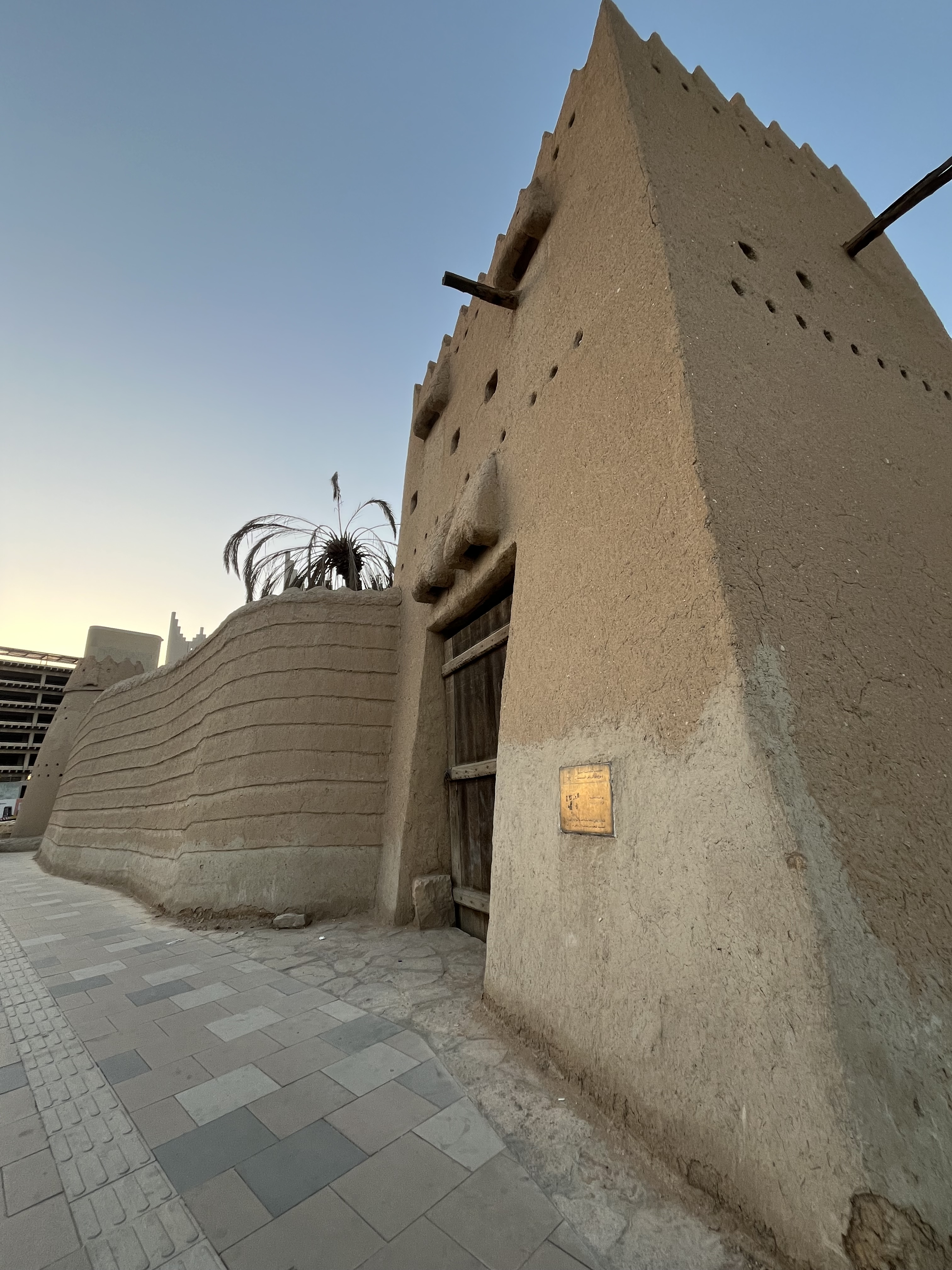
- Dakhna Gate, 2026
- Interactive map of Dakhna Gate
- 24.62708°N 46.71167°E
- Location: Ad-Dirah, Riyadh, Saudi Arabia

History
- Built: 18th or 19th century

Site notes
- Restored: 1992
- Restored by: Salman bin Abdulaziz (1992)

Dakhnah Gate (Arabic: بوابة دخنة) or Dekhna Gate, alternatively known as al-Darwaza al-Kabirah (Arabic: الدروازة الكبيرة), is an 18th or 19th-century historic earth-structured fortified gateway in the ad-Dirah neighborhood of Riyadh, Saudi Arabia, located in the southern part of Qasr al-Hukm District. Named after the erstwhile Dakhna quarter of the former walled town, it was rebuilt from 1988 to 1992 as part of the Qasr Al Hukm District Development Project. The historic structure is one of the few remaining gates of Riyadh's old city walls and served as the main entrance to the walled town of from the south, until the dismantling of the fortifications in the 1950s.
