= Tarfa bint Abdullah Al Sheikh =

Saudi royal (1884–1906)

- Born: 1884
- Died: October 1906 (aged 27–28)
- Spouse: Abdulaziz bin Abdul Rahman Al Saud (m. 1902)
- Issue: Princess Noura; King Faisal
Names
- Tarfa bint Abdullah bin Abdullatif Al Sheikh
- House: Al Sheikh (by birth); Al Saud (by marriage)
- Father: Abdullah bin Abdullatif Al Sheikh
- Mother: Haya bint Abdul Rahman Al Muqbel

Tarfa bint Abdullah Al Sheikh (Arabic: طرفة بنت عبد الله آل الشيخ, romanized: Ṭarfā bint ʿAbd Allāh Al ash Sheikh; 1884–1906) was the third wife and one of the 22 consorts of Abdulaziz bin Abdul Rahman, Emir of Nejd (later King Abdulaziz of Saudi Arabia), and the mother of Princess Noura and King Faisal.

== Background and early life ==
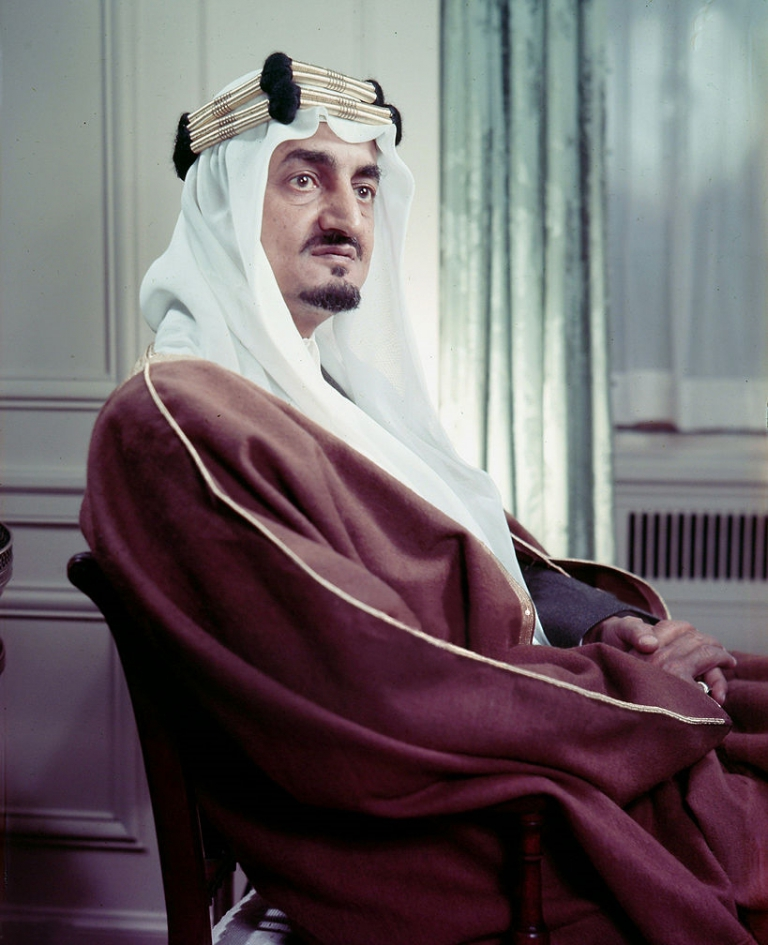
Tarfa's son King Faisal

Tarfa bint Abdullah Al Sheikh was born in 1884. Her mother was Haya bint Abdul Rahman Al Muqbel. Her family were from a village near Riyadh.

Tarfa's father, Abdullah bin Abdullatif Al Sheikh, was a member of the Al Sheikh family and one of the principal religious teachers and advisers to the Emir of Nejd, Abdulaziz bin Abdul Rahman. However, until Emir Abdulaziz captured Riyadh, Abdullah was a supporter of Emir Muhammad bin Abdullah Al Rashid. Tarfa was one of Muhammad ibn Abd al-Wahhab's eighth generation direct descendants.

== Personal life and death ==
Tarfa bint Abdullah married Emir Abdulaziz in 1902 immediately after he captured Riyadh. She was his third wife. Tarfa's sister Munira married Abdulaziz's half-brother Muhammad bin Abdul Rahman, and her other sister, Sara, married Abdulaziz's full-brother Saad bin Abdul Rahman. These marriages were strategic moves to strengthen the links between the Al Sauds and the Al Sheikhs.

Abdulaziz and Tarfa's first child, Noura, was born in 1904. Their son, Faisal, was born in Riyadh in April 1906. Tarfa died in October 1906 when Faisal was just six months old. Her daughter Noura married a cousin, Khalid bin Muhammad, son of Muhammad bin Abdul Rahman. Tarfa's son Faisal would become king of Saudi Arabia in 1964.
