= Salman Hamad Al-Sheikh =

Bahraini Soldier and Politician

Salman Hamad Al-Sheikh (Arabic: سلمان حمد الشيخ, born November 13, 1968 (age 56)) is a Bahraini soldier and politician.

== Career ==
Al-Sheikh earned a Bachelor of Science in Aviation in Jordan in 1989 and a Higher Diploma in Management, a Higher Diploma in Management and Leadership Studies in the United States of America, and a Master of Business Administration and Islamic Economics with distinction from the University College of Bahrain in 2008.

He served as a pilot in the Bahrain Defence Force for 21 years.

In the 2010 Bahraini general election, he lost a race to represent the Third District of the Central Governorate in the Council of Representatives with 236 votes for 5.70%. In the 2011 Bahraini parliamentary by-elections, he won the race for the Fifth District of the Northern Governorate with 460 votes for 53.40%. He lost the race for the First District of the Southern Governorate in the 2014 Bahraini general election with 69 votes for 1.27%.

=== Immunity waiver ===
In April 2013, the Council revoked Al-Sheikh’s immunity after a complaint was filed against him by Minister of Justice Khalid bin Ali bin Abdullah Al Khalifa for brandishing a weapon in a nightclub.
