= Qaṣr al-ʿĀmir Fayṣal bin Saʿad =

Historic building in Riyadh

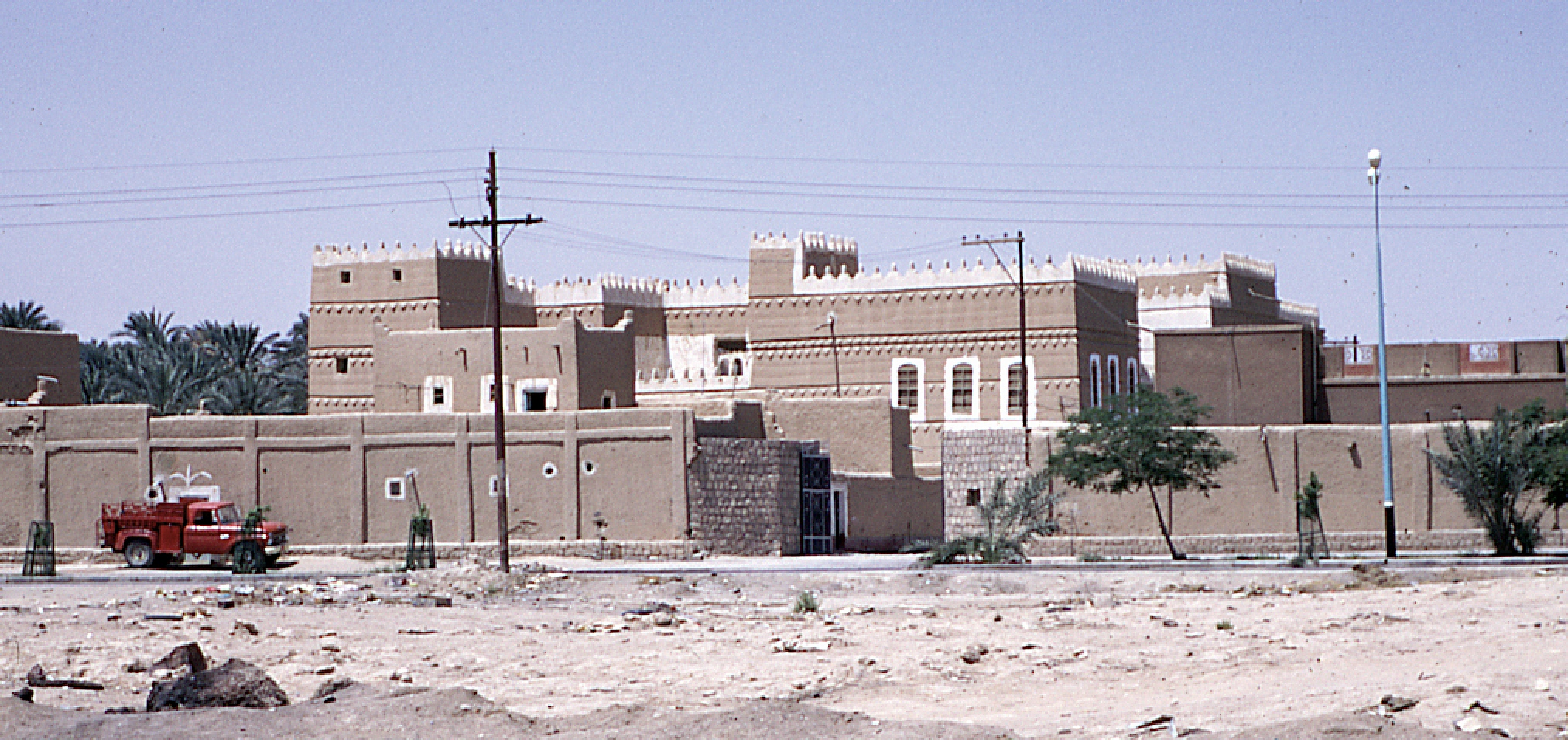
- Qaṣr al-ʿĀmir Fayṣal bin Saʿad in 1974
- Interactive map of the Qaṣr al-ʿĀmir Fayṣal bin Saʿad area

General information
- Architectural style: Najdi architecture
- Location: Riyadh, Saudi Arabia
- Coordinates: 24°38′42″N 46°42′44″E
- Completed: 1930s
- Demolished: 2000s

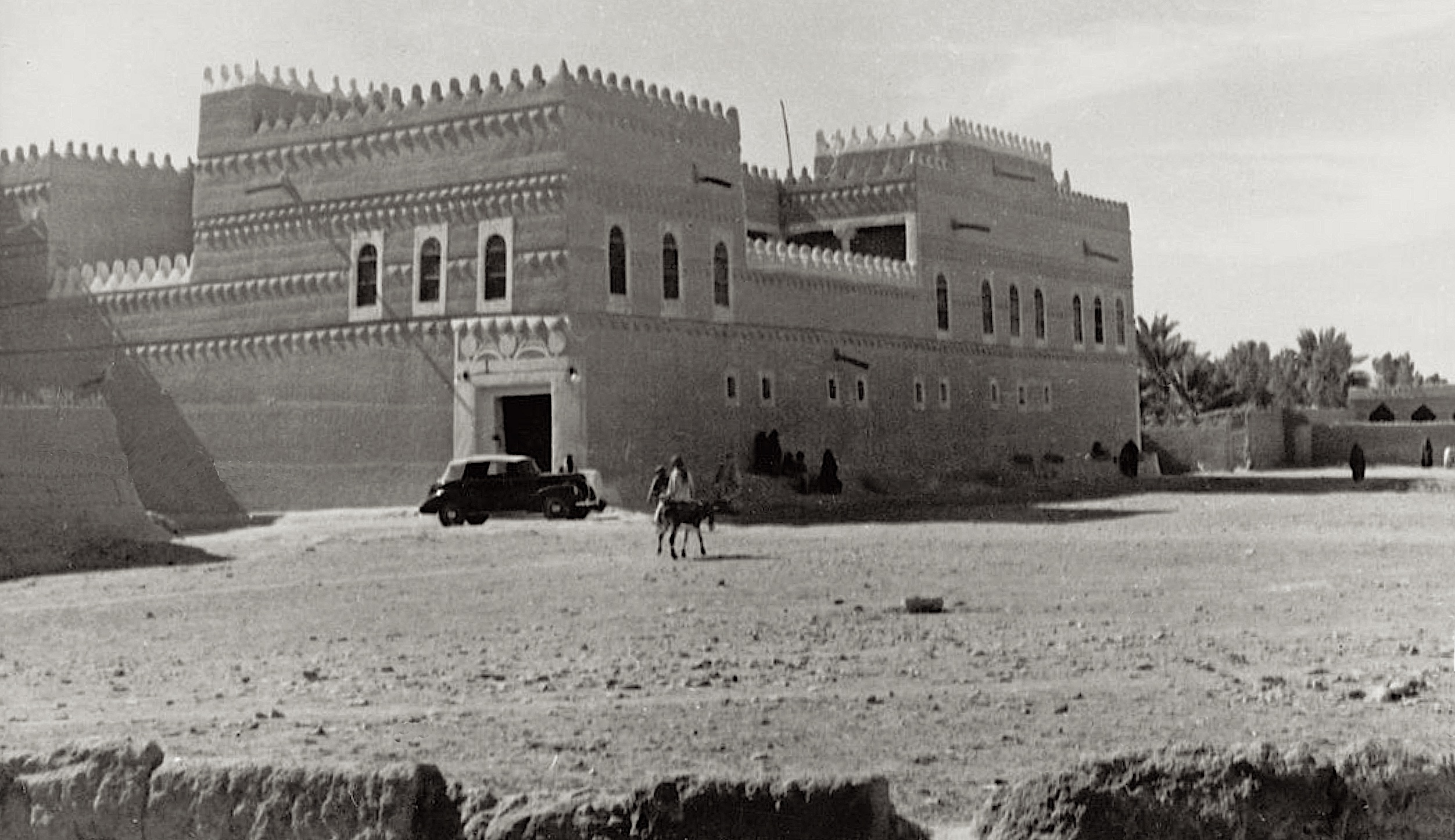
Riyadh, Qaṣr al-ʿĀmir Fayṣal bin Saʿad, from the north east, after 1939

Qaṣr al-ʿĀmir Fayṣal bin Saʿad (Arabic: قصر الأمير فيصل بن سعد, romanized: Qaṣr al-ʿĀmir Fayṣal bin Saʿad) was a palace in Riyadh, Saudi Arabia. It was built for Fayṣal bin Saʿad, the son of Sa'ad bin Abdul Rahman Al Saud, the latter a brother of King 'Abd al-'Aziz Ibn Saud. Fayṣal bin Saʿad married three daughters of King 'Abd al-'Aziz Ibn Saud: Sara bint Abdulaziz Al Saud, Qumash bint Abdulaziz Al Saud and Nura bint Abdulaziz Al Saud. The palace was located in palm gardens north of the old town, directly adjacent to Qaṣr al-Shamsīyya. The building has been demolished and replaced by the King Abdulaziz Public Library and the General Court. The location is next to the Riyadh Water Tower.

Gerald de Gaury, who was in Riyadh in the 1930s, illustrated the palace in his book Arabia Phoenix.

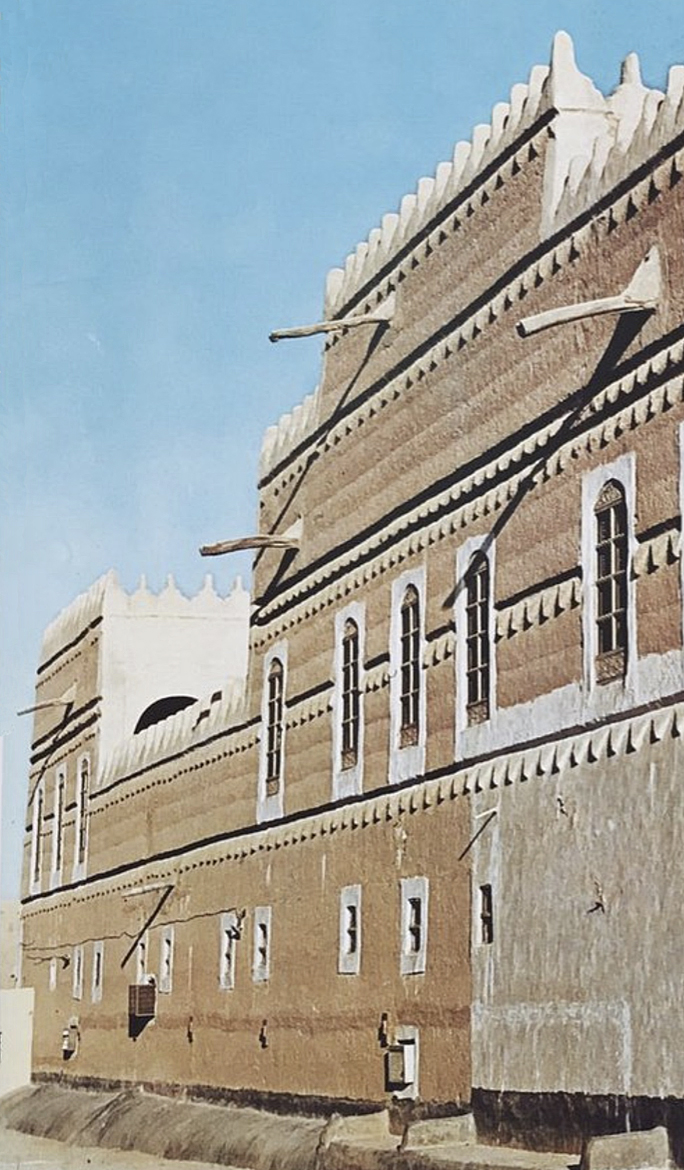
Riyadh, Exterior of the palace of al-ʿĀmir Fayṣal bin Saʿad
