= Al Doho =

Al-Doho حي الدحو
- Neighbourhood
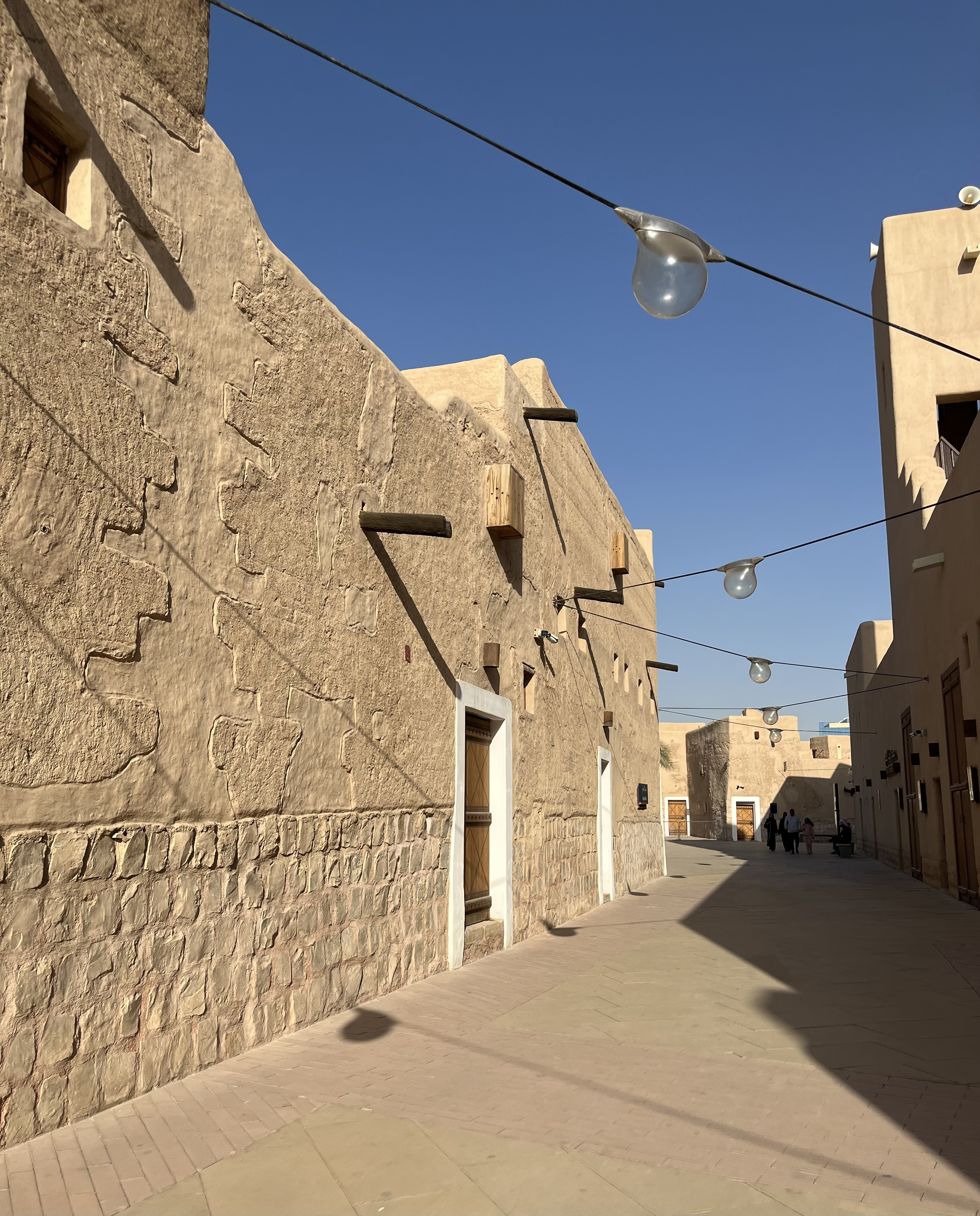
- Ad-Doho neighborhood, 2026
- Country: Saudi Arabia
- City: Riyadh
- Region: Old Riyadh

Government
  - Body: Baladiyah al-Batha

Area
  - Total: 0.08151 km^{2} (0.03147 sq mi)

Language
  - Official: Arabic

Al-Doho (Arabic: حي الدحو), formerly Haara al-Hilla (Arabic: حارة الحلة) and alternatively transliterated as al-Daho, al-Duhu or al-Dahu, is a historic neighborhood situated within the former old city walls of southern Riyadh, Saudi Arabia, located in the Qasr al-Hukm District of al-Batʼha sub-municipality. It is the most preserved neighborhood in terms of heritage and the only quarter from the former walled town that is recognized by the Riyadh Municipality, while the rest of extinct settlements lie in the adjacent ad-Dirah district. Its current form include parts of Gadimah quarter.

Bordered by King Faisal Road to the east, al-Thumairi Street to the north, al-Madinah al-Munawwarah Road to the south and Sheikh Muhammad bin Ibrahim Street to the west, it is considered to be one of the last remnants of the old city neighborhoods. The Royal Commission for Riyadh City (then The High Commission for the Development of Arriyadh) presented the plan to resuscitate the neighborhood in 2010 at the 2010 Saudi Travel and Tourism Investment Market and began its implementation 2013. The district was opened to visitors in March 2023.
