= Suleiman bin Abdullah Al Sheikh =

Religious scholar in the Emirate of Diriyah (1785–1818)

- Born: 1785
- Died: October 1818 (aged 32–33); Diriyah
- Occupation: Religious scholar
- Known for: Qadi of Diriyah
- Notable work: al-Dalail fi Hukm Muwalat Ahl-al Ishrak (Arabic: Evidence Against Loyalty to the Polytheists)
- Father: Abdullah bin Muhammad Al Sheikh

Suleiman bin Abdullah Al Sheikh (1785 – October 1818) was a religious scholar in the Emirate of Diriyah and one of the grandsons of Muhammad ibn Abd al-Wahhab. He was the author of "al-Dalail fi Hukm Muwalat Ahl al-Ishrak" (Arabic: Evidence Against Loyalty to the Polytheists).

== Biography ==
Suleiman was born in 1785 into the Al Sheikh family, and his father was Abdullah bin Muhammad, a son of Muhammad ibn Abd al-Wahhab. Suleiman was a religious scholar like his father, uncles and grandfather and served as the qadi of Diriyah.

Following the capture of Hejaz region by the Emirate of Diriyah in 1802–1803 Suleiman requested the ulema in the region to adopt the approach that reflected that of his grandfather Muhammed Ibn Abdul Wahhab which was not accepted by them. Then, they were declared by Suleiman as apostates. During the battles between the forces of the Emirate and the Egyptian-Ottoman troops Suleiman was one of the defenders of Diriyah. For him it was not an ordinary battle between two political forces with conflicting interests, but between believers and non-believers or infidels. Abdullah issued several fatwas to express how Wahhabis should behave against those who did not follow Wahhabi belief. In these fatwas Suleiman also outlined the conditions about visiting the lands of infidels. He argued that Wahhabi visitors should overtly practice their religion in such places and that they should not have close relations with infidels while visiting their land.

One month after the capture of Diriyah by the Egyptian forces led by Ibrahim Pasha, son of Muhammad Ali, in October 1818 Suleiman was killed by them, since he did not accept their supremacy which he regarded as the submission to kufr.

=== Views ===
Suleiman was the first Salafi cleric noteworthy for introducing a novel approach to Takfir, based on re-conceptualising the works of Ibn Abd al-Wahhab and Ibn Taymiyyah, in the context of Ottoman-Saudi wars. These treatises would set the foundational principles for the Takfiri discourse of the 19th century ideologues of classical Wahhabism. Sulayman's works served as a manual for later Salafi scholars to make sense of the major tenets of Muhammad ibn Abd al-Wahhab. Based on Sulayman's approach, classical Wahhabi scholars would formulate a novel doctrine of Takfir that expanded beyond the traditional paradigm of early Salafis and excommunicated most of the political opponents of the Second Saudi state.

He suggested that true believers should not hesitate to show their hostility against the people having different religious beliefs. His view was just a reproduction of the approach that had existed in Islam, since the seventh century which emphasized the difference between true and false religion and banned all interaction with infidels. Here, infidels refer to Muslims from different religious sects.

The views of Suleiman bin Abdullah were frequently adopted by his cousin, Abdul Rahman bin Hasan, and other religious scholars during the second Saudi State, or Emirate of Najd. His views were also used by the Ikhwan leaders in the late 1920s just before their revolt against King Abdulaziz as a justification for their resistance to him. King Abdulaziz argued that Suleiman's views should be taken into consideration in the related context and period of time.
