= Shawqi al-Shaykh =

Shawqi al-Shaykh (Arabic: شوقي الشيخ) was an Egyptian Islamist who broke way from al-Gama'a al-Islamiyya to found the group al-Shawqiyun in the late 1980s. Al-Shaykh was a proponent of the doctrine of Takfir and publicly challenged the leadership of al-Gama'a al-Islamiyya calling Omar Abdel Rahman an apostate and demanding that Hosni Mubarak pay him the Jizya. Egyptian security forces killed Al-Shaykh in the village of Kahk in the governorate of Fayoum in April 1990.

== Life ==
Shawqi al-Shaykh's path to radicalization began in the early 1980s when he was imprisoned on charges of belonging to the Al-Jama'a Al-Islamiyya. While in prison the former engineer became acquainted with Naguib Abdel Fattah Ismail, the son of the deceased Muslim Brotherhood member Abdel Fattah Ismail. While in prison Shaykh adopted radical views that would lead him to become too extreme even for Al-Gama'a Al-Islamiyya. After being released from prison he developed a reputation for being a determined and capable militant. Some time in the late 1980s al-Shaykh broke ties with Al-Gama'a Islamiyya and formed his own group in [Faiyum] called al-Shawqiyun.

Al-Shawqiyun won support from the impoverished Egyptians in the Faiyum oasis south of Cairo. Al-Shaykh used their support to seize control of the village of Kahk. Al-Shawqiyun established a small emirate in Kahk and imposed an austere brand of Islam on the villagers there. Al-Shaykh determined that all who were not active in his organization were unbelievers. Al-Shaykh even went so far as to send a telegram to then president Hosni Mubarak demanding that Mubarak convert or pay him the Jizya tax. The stunt earned the ire of Mubarak who ordered military action against Al-Shaykh. In 25th of April 1990, Al-Shaykh was killed by a security forces raid on Kahk. Even after Al-Shaykh's death, his followers refused to submit to the Egyptian government's authority and demanding the establishment of an Islamic state in Egypt.

== Influence ==
Ahmad al-Drayni believed that Shawqi al-Shaykh helped inspire the brand of Islamic radicalism that would influence the rise of ISIS.
