= Mugailiyah =

Al Mugailiyah المعيقلية
- Neighbourhood
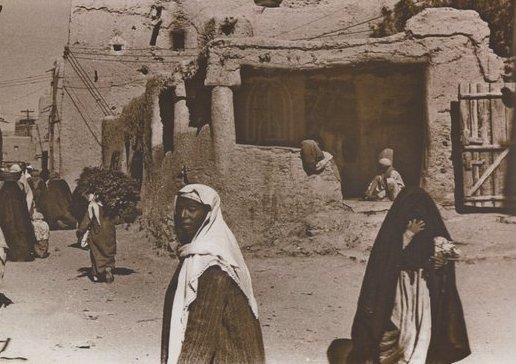
- Al-Suwailem Street, 1952
- Interactive map of Al Mugailiyah
- Coordinates: 24°37′49″N 46°42′31″E
- Country: Saudi Arabia
- City: Riyadh
- Region: Old Riyadh
- Named for: Al-Muʼeiqiliah Mosque
- Sub-quarters: Hillat al-Ata'if

Language
  - Official: Arabic

Hillat al-Muʼaykaliyah (Arabic: حلة المعيقلية) or al-Muʼeiqiliah, and in Najdi vernacular pronunciation as al-Mugailiyah or al-Maigliah, was a residential quarter and a douar within the city walls in the erstwhile fortress-city of Riyadh, Saudi Arabia, located west of Duhairah in the northwestern corner of the walled town. It contained the sub-quarter of Hillat al-Ata'if (Arabic: حلة العطايف) and al-Muʼeiqiliah Mosque, al-Ata'if Mosque as well as Ibn Suleiman School. The douar ceased to exist in the aftermath of the demolition of city walls in 1950 and subsequent expansion of Riyadh into a metropolis between the 1950s and 1970s. It is today largely situated on the site of Al Maigliah Market Center in the Qasr Al Hukm District.

The quarter was inhabited mostly by professionals and craftsmen and was bounded by al-Suwailem Street from the east, al-Ghanaiy quarter from the south and al-Badiʼah Gate from the west, which served as the main northwestern entrance to the town.
