= Al Gadimah (Riyadh) =

Al-Gadimah القديمة
- Neighbourhood
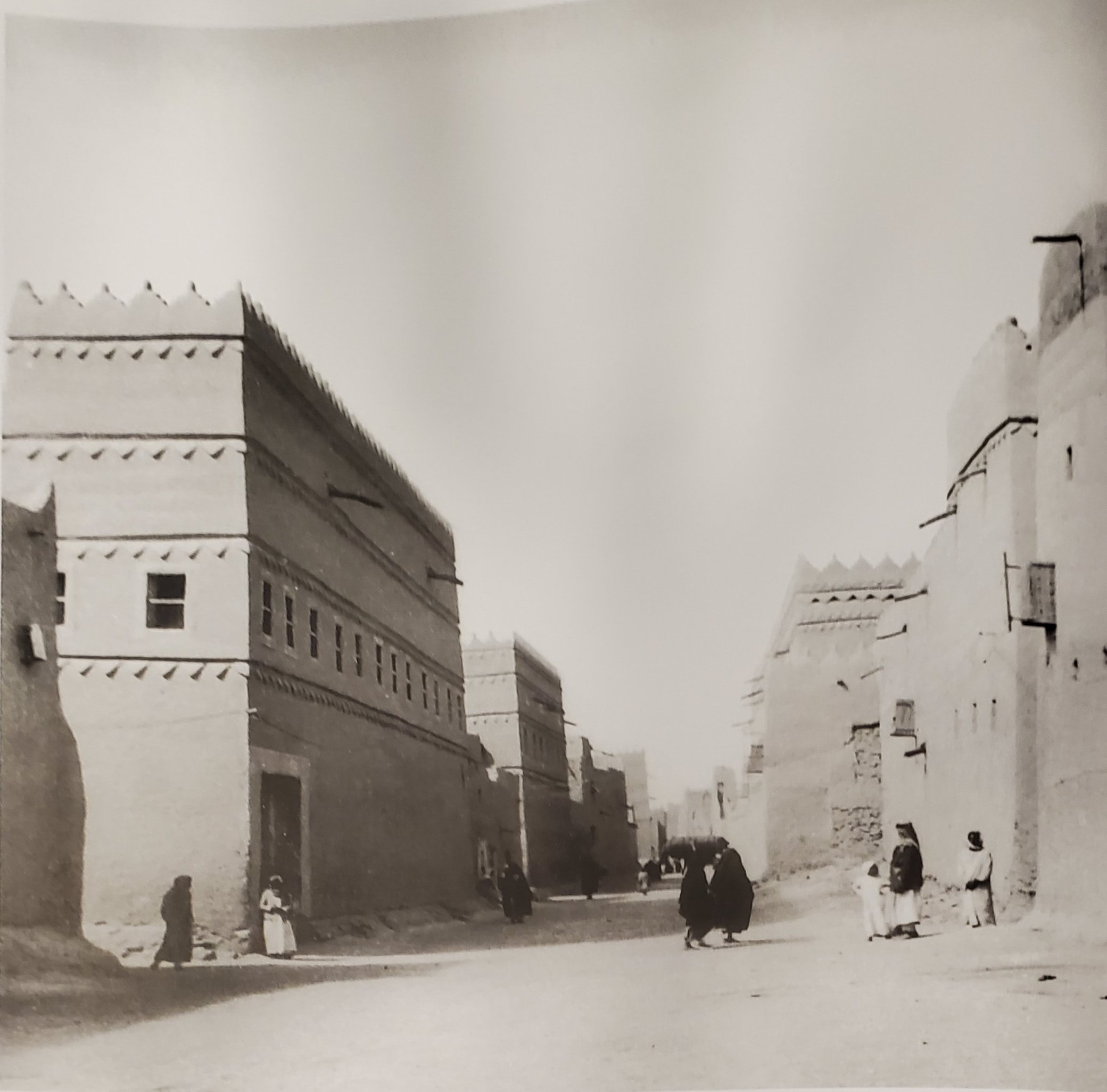
- Thumairi Street, 1938
- Interactive map of Al-Gadimah
- Coordinates: 24°37′46″N 46°42′50″E
- Country: Saudi Arabia
- City: Riyadh
- Region: Old Riyadh

Language
  - Official: Arabic

Hillat al-Qadimah (Arabic: حلة القديمة, lit. 'old quarter'), or in Najdi vernacular pronunciation as al-Gadimah and originally known as Hayy al-Aamir (Arabic: حي عامر), was a quarter and a douar within the city walls in the erstwhile fortress-city of Riyadh, Saudi Arabia, located in the southeastern corner of the walled town.

== History ==
Al-Gadimah were traditional quarters within the historic walled city of Riyadh, consisting of mud-brick structures and narrow streets. The neighborhood formed part of a network of settlements that supported agricultural and residential life in the oasis environment of central Arabia.

== Urban development ==
The quarters were later incorporated into the capital metropolis of Riyadh following the dismantling of the city walls in the 1950s. The area was partially rebuilt and today forms part of ad-Doho neighborhood in the Qasr al-Hukm District. The settlement hosted the al-Hilla Mosque.

The settlement hosted the palaces of Imam Abdul Rahman bin Faisal al-Saud, Prince Abdullah bin Abdul Rahman al-Saud, Prince Muhammad bin Abdul Rahman al-Saud, Prince Faisal bin Abdulaziz, Prince Muhammad bin Abdulaziz al-Saud, Prince Mansour bin Abdulaziz al-Saud, Prince Musaid bin Abdul Rahman Al Saud, Prince Khalid bin Abdulaziz, and Prince Fahd bin Abdulaziz.
