= Abd Allah ibn Abd al-Latif Al ash-Sheikh =

Saudi religious scholar

ʿAbd Allāh ibn Abd al-Laṭīf Āl ash-Shaykh
- عبد الله ابن عبد اللطيف آل الشيخ
- Born: 1848
- Died: 1921 (aged 72–73)
- Occupation: Islamic scholar
- Era: 19th Century - 20th Century
- Children: Tarfa bint Abd Allah
- Relatives: Faisal of Saudi Arabia (maternal grandson); Ibn Saud (son in law)
- Family: Al ash-Sheikh

ʿAbd Allāh ibn ʿAbd al-Laṭīf Āl ash-Shaykh (Arabic: عبد الله بن عبد اللطيف آل الشيخ; 1848–1921) was a scholar from Nejd in Arabia and was the grandfather of King Faisal. He was a descendant of Muḥammad ibn ʿAbd al Wahhāb.

== Background ==
Abd Allah ibn Abd al-Latif Al ash-Sheikh was born in 1848 into the noted family of Nejdi religious scholars, the Al ash-Sheikh, descendants of Muhammad ibn Abd al-Wahhab. His father was Abd al Latif ibn Abd al Rahman Al Sheikh. One of Abd Allah's brothers, Muhammad, was also a religious figure.

== Career ==
Abd Allah was the leader of the Saudi ulema at the end of the 19th century. He was the teacher of Ibn Saud, later King Abdulaziz, concerning the principles of the Islamic jurisprudence and monotheism. In 1892, the Saudi state was destroyed by their rivals, the Al Rashid of Ha'il, and the Saudi leadership went into exile. Rather than going into exile as well, Abd Allah sided with the Al Rashid and moved to Ha'il. The Al Saud returned from exile in 1902 under the leadership of Abdulaziz Al Saud (later Saudi Arabia's first king) and re-established the Saudi state around Riyadh. Abd Allah bin Abd al-Latif then changed sides again and re-joined the Al Saud, a change of heart which was accepted by Abdulaziz.

Abd Allah was one of the ulemas who guided the early leaders of the Ikhwan when the group was formed by Abdulaziz in 1912. He remained as leader of the Saudi religious establishment until his death in 1921.

== Personal life ==
In 1902, his and Haya bint Abdul Rahman Al Muqbel's daughter, Tarfa bint Abdullah, married Ibn Saud. Their son, Faisal, later became King of Saudi Arabia. Abdullah's two other daughters also married the members of the Al Saud family. His daughter Sara married Saad bin Abdul Rahman, full brother of King Abdulaziz. The other daughter, Munira, married to Muhammad bin Abdul Rahman, half-brother of King Abdulaziz. These marriages were strategic moves to strengthen the links between two families, namely the Al Sauds and the Al Sheikhs.
