= Muraighib =

Al Muraighib المريقب
- Neighbourhood
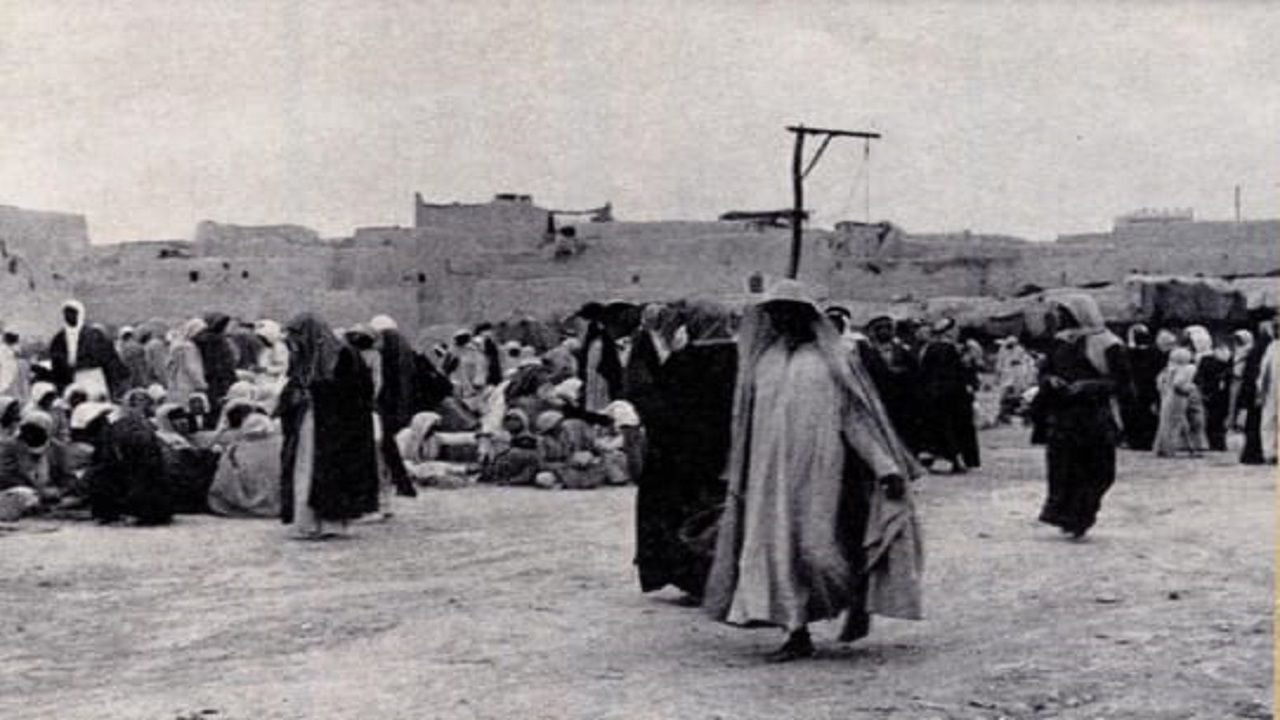
- Souq al-Mughaibrah, 1943
- Interactive map of Al Muraighib
- Coordinates: 24°37′38″N 46°42′26″E
- Country: Saudi Arabia
- City: Riyadh
- Region: Old Riyadh
- Sub-quarters: Hillat al-Mughaibrah

Language
  - Official: Arabic

Hillat al-Muraiqib (Arabic: حلة المريقب), or in Najdi vernacular pronunciation as al-Muraighib, was a quarter and a douar within the city walls in the erstwhile fortress-city of Riyadh, Saudi Arabia, located in the southwestern corner of the walled town. It contained the sub-quarter of Hillat al-Mughaibrah (Arabic: حلة المقيبرة, lit. 'the graveyard quarter'), which included a cemetery and an eponymous souq.

The al-Mughaibrah sub-quarter hosted one of the two cemeteries that catered the needs of the town's inhabitants, other being Shalaga. It hosted the Muraighib School and Muraighib Mosque.

The Souq al-Mughaibrah (Arabic: سوق المريقب) was a traditional market in the Mughaibrah sub-quarter. It was one of the most important trading commercial centers of the walled town. The souq survived following the dismantling of city walls and is today largely situated on the site of Souq al-Tamir. The souq included Qaisiriya al-Hasawiya (Arabic: قيصرية الحساوية) and Souq al-Jufrah (Arabic: سوق الجفرة, lit. 'the pit market').

It was bounded by Hillat al-Sharqiyah from the east, al-Ghanaiy quarter from the north and al-Muraighib Gate from the west, which served as the main southwestern entrance to the town.
