= Duhairah =

Extinct neighborhood in southern Riyadh, Saudi Arabia

Al-Duhairah الظهيرة
- Neighbourhood
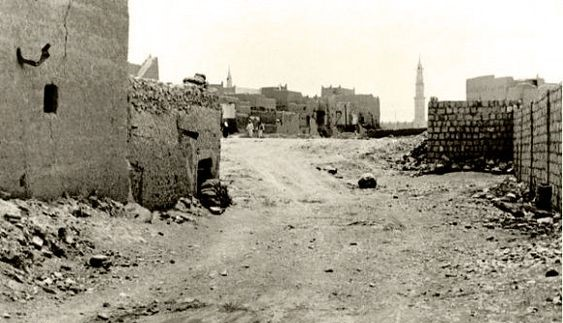
- Al-Duhairah Street, 1959 or 1960
- Country: Saudi Arabia
- City: Riyadh
- Region: Old Riyadh

Language
  - Official: Arabic

Hillat Al-Duhairah (Arabic: حلة الظهيرة), alternatively transliterated as al-Zuhayri, was a neighborhood and a douar partially within the former city walls that is under rehabilitation in southern Riyadh, Saudi Arabia. Located in close proximity to the Qasr al-Hukm District in the old city region, the ruins of the area today constitute a large chunk of ad-Dirah neighborhood. Bordered by al-Suwailem Street to the west and ad-Duhairah Street to the east, most of its residents abandoned the area during Riyadh's multiple phases of expansion and modernization, especially between 1950s and 1970s. As of 2024, Duhairah still remains unrecognized by Riyadh Municipality.

The Saudi government since 2009 has sought to revive the neighborhood by launching the Al-Zahirah Development Project through the Royal Commission for Riyadh City, which intends to make the area a hub for tourist and commercial activities. The neighborhood's name was derived from its geographic location, as it was situated on a rocky ridge.
