= Abdullah bin Muhammad Al Sheikh =

Head of judicial system in the Emirate of Diriyah (1751–1829)

Chief Qadi of the Emirate of Dir'iyah
- In office 1809–1818
- Preceded by: Husayn bin Muhammad

Personal life
- Born: 1751 Diriyah
- Died: 1829 (aged 77–78) Cairo
- Children: 3, including Suleiman
- Parent: Muhammad ibn Abd al-Wahhab (father)
- Occupation: Religious scholar

Religious life
- Religion: Islam
- Denomination: Sunni
- Jurisprudence: Hanbali
- Creed: Atharī

Abdullah bin Muhammad Al Sheikh (1751–1829) was a Muslim scholar who served as the head of the judicial system during the First Saudi State, also known as the Emirate of Diriyah. He was a son of Muhammad ibn Abd al-Wahhab, who was credited with introducing the Salafiyyah form of Islam. Abdullah developed the doctrine of this religious belief. David Commins, an American scholar on Wahhabism, argues that Abdullah was the most significant son of Muhammad.

== Early life and career ==
Abdullah bin Muhammad was born in Diriyah in 1751 as one of Muhammad ibn Abd al-Wahhab's four sons, founder of Wahhabism. He was raised in Diriyah and educated by his father on the topics of the Islamic schools of law, legal theory, Quranic commentary, philology and hadith tradition. Together with his brothers, Husayn, Ali and Ibrahim, Abdullah established a religious school close to their home in Diriyah and taught the young students from Yemen, Oman, Najd and other parts of Arabia at their majlis, including Husayn Ibn Abu Bakr Ibn Ghannam, a well-known Hanbali-Wahhabi scholar who was a Maliki scholar from Al Ahsa before he had come Najd.

Following the death of his father, his brother Husayn succeeded him as the head of the judicial system of the Emirate. Abdullah replaced Husayn in the post in 1809 when he died.

Abdullah served as chief qadi and grand mufti during the reign of three successive emirs, Abdulaziz, Saud and Abdullah. In this capacity he assigned the religious teachers and qadis in the Emirate. Abdullah supported the attacks against Shiites in Karbala in 1802 and had writings against their views. As his father Abdullah described the religious views of Shiites and Zaydis as deviance from Islam. In 1806 he accompanied Emir Saud when Mecca was captured and initiated Wahhabi propaganda in the city. Abdullah's fatwas that were issued following the incident are the earliest formulation of Hanbali-Wahhabi doctrine which became the routine ideology of this religious approach.

One of Abdullah's works was the biography of the Muslim prophet Muhammad.

== Personal life and death ==
One of Abdullah's sons was Suleiman (1785–1818), who was a significant Wahhabi ulema and the author of al Dalail fi Hukm Muwalat Ahl al Ishrak (Arabic: Evidence Against Loyalty to the Polytheists). The others were Abdul Rahman and Ali the latter of whom was murdered during the capture of Diriyah by the Egyptian forces led by Ibrahim Pasha in September 1818. In the same incident Abdullah bin Muhammad and his son Abdul Rahman were sent to Cairo together with his relatives and the members of the Al Saud family. He died there in 1829.
