= Al Wisham =

Al-Wisham الوشام
- Neighbourhood
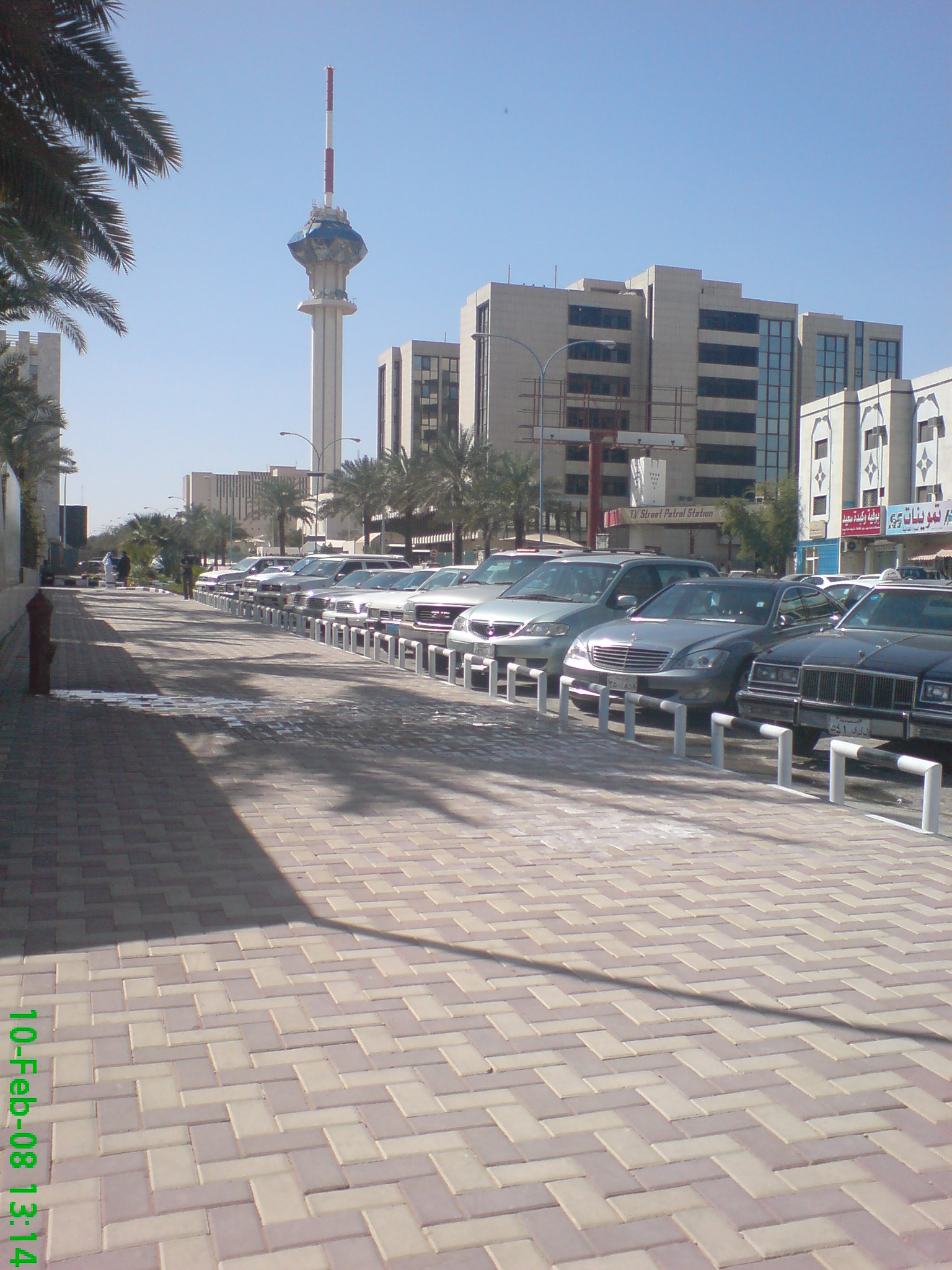
- Riyadh TV Tower, 2008

- Location within Saudi Arabia Location within Asia
- Coordinates: 24°38′36″N 46°41′53″E
- Country: Saudi Arabia
- City: Riyadh
- Baladiyah: Al Shumaisi
- Emerged: 1940s

Language
  - Official: Arabic

Al-Wisham (Arabic: الوشام, lit. 'the tattoos') is a neighbourhood in Riyadh, Saudi Arabia, located west of al-Futah and north of Umm Sulaim in the sub-municipality of al-Shumaisi. The district emerged in the 1940s when King Abdulaziz ibn Saud built several palaces in the area for his son, Prince Mansour bin Abdulaziz. It was later incorporated into the capital metropolis during its multiple phases of expansion between 1950s and 1970s. It hosts the Riyadh TV Tower, one of the city's major landmarks.
