= Maydan Ad-Diriyah =

Maydān Ad-Diriyah
- Interactive map of Maydān Ad-Diriyah
- Native name: مَيْدَانُ الدِّرْعِيَّة
- Area: 186,000 square metres (2,000,000 sq ft)
- Location: Ad-Diriyah, Saudi Arabia
- Coordinates: 24°43′23.75774″N 46°34′53.70708″E

Construction
- Construction start: 2022

Maydān Ad-Diriyah (Arabic: مَيْدَانُ الدِّرْعِيَّة; "Ad-Diriyah Square") is a pedestrian-oriented square in historic Diriyah, west of Al-Jaddah Al-Kubra, in Riyadh, Saudi Arabia. Part of the Diriyah development project, it is a mixed-use retail and hospitality district designed in the Najdi architectural style and developed in line with Saudi Vision 2030. Covering 186,000 square metres, it is located near the At-Turaif District, a UNESCO World Heritage Site, and is planned to include retail space, dining venues, hotels, residences, offices, entertainment facilities, and underground parking.

== Infrastructure ==
Diriyah Company signed a contract with Salini Saudi Arabia, a subsidiary of the Italian Webuild Group, valued at SAR 2.249 billion for the construction of the above-ground commercial district, including retail areas, hotels, residential and hospitality units, office spaces, as well as underground parking facilities.

=== Parking ===
Underground parking facilities were constructed beneath the square across three underground levels with a capacity of 10,500 vehicles. They are among the largest parking facilities in the world and include integrated bus services, designated taxi and passenger drop-off areas, and four underground routes connecting different parts of the master plan.

== Features ==
Diriyah Square includes retail, hospitality, and entertainment facilities. It comprises 73 buildings and approximately 400 units designated for commercial and service use, hosting more than 400 international brands, including:

- Adidas
- Spinneys
- Apple (the first Apple Store in Saudi Arabia)
- VOX Cinemas
- Shiseido
- Lululemon
- Abercrombie & Fitch
- AllSaints
- Hollister Co.
- Alo Yoga

== See also ==
- Al-Jami'u Al-Kabeer
- At-Turaif District
- Al-Jaddah Al-Kubra
