= Ulaysha =

Neighbourhood in Riyadh, Saudi Arabia

Coordinates: 24°37′56″N 46°41′05″E

Ulaysha (Arabic: حي عليشة) or Ulaisha is a residential neighborhood and a subject of Baladiyah al-Shumaisi in south-western Riyadh, Saudi Arabia. Bordered by al-Badiah neighborhood to the south, al-Rafiah neighborhood to the west, al-Fakhiriyyah neighborhood to the north and al-Shumaysi, Umm Salim and al-Wisham neighborhoods to the east, it is considered to part of the old city area.
