= Al Shumaisi =

Al-Shumaisi الشميسي
- Neighbourhood
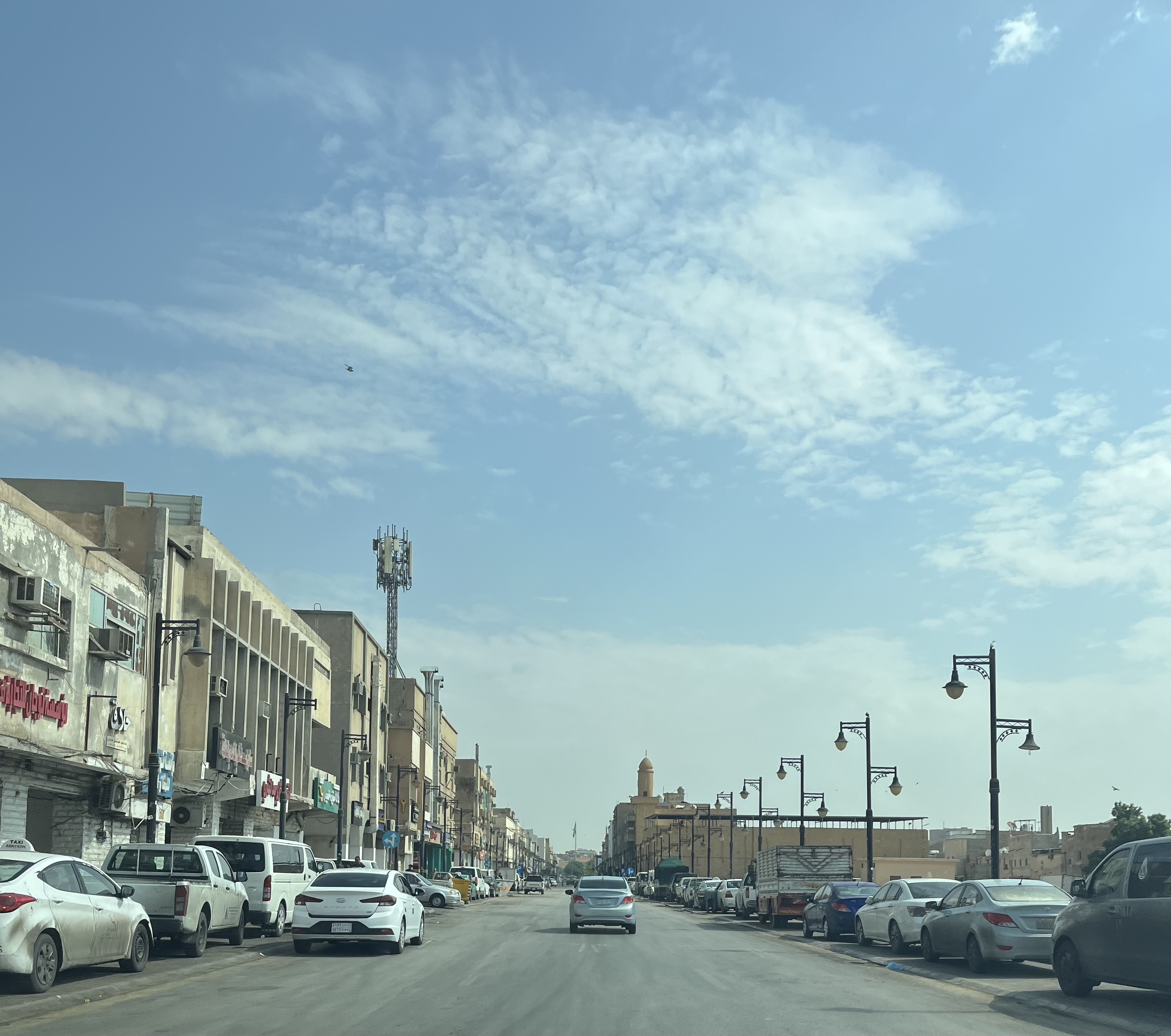
- Al Shumaisi, 2024

- Location within Saudi Arabia
- Coordinates: 24°37′27″N 46°41′56″E
- Country: Saudi Arabia
- City: Riyadh
- Region: Old Riyadh
- Named for: Sheikh Muhammad bin Ali al-Shumaisi

Government
  - Body: Baladiyah al-Shumaisi

Language
  - Official: Arabic

Al-Shumaisi (Arabic: الشميسي) is a historic neighborhood and the seat of the homonymous sub-municipality, al-Shumaisi, in southern Riyadh, Saudi Arabia, located west of ad-Dirah and east of al-Badiah. The neighborhood is named after Sheikh Muhammad bin Ali al-Shumaisi, who owned a farm that was attributed to his family name in the area sometime around 1930s. It is today inhabited mostly by an overseas Pakistani community. It is well known for hosting Riyadh's first hospital, the King Saud Medical City.
