= Qaṣr al-Shamsīyya =

Historic building in Riyadh

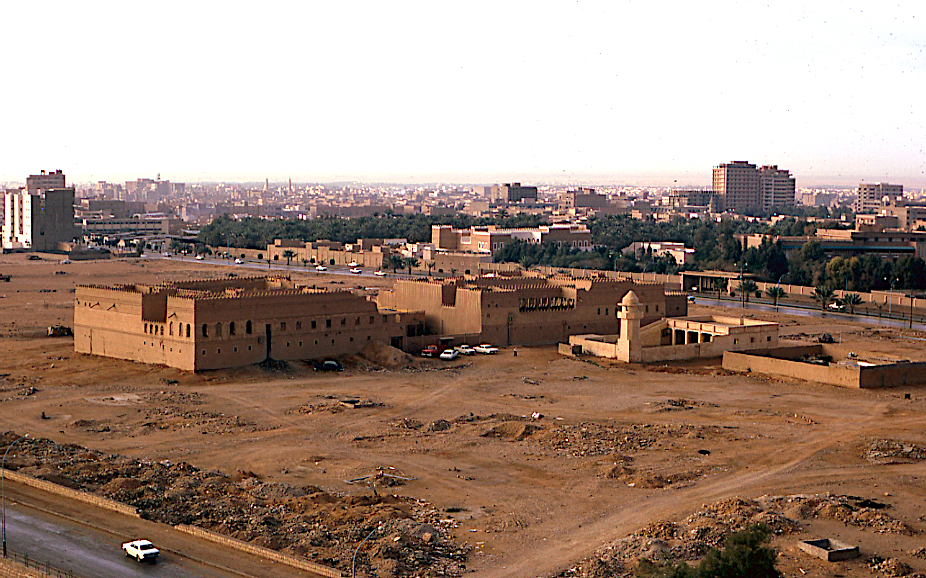
- Qaṣr al-Shamsīyya in 1974
- Interactive map of the Qaṣr al-Shamsīyya area

General information
- Architectural style: Najdi architecture
- Location: Riyadh, Saudi Arabia
- Coordinates: 24°38′42″N 46°42′44″E
- Completed: 1930s
- Demolished: 1970s

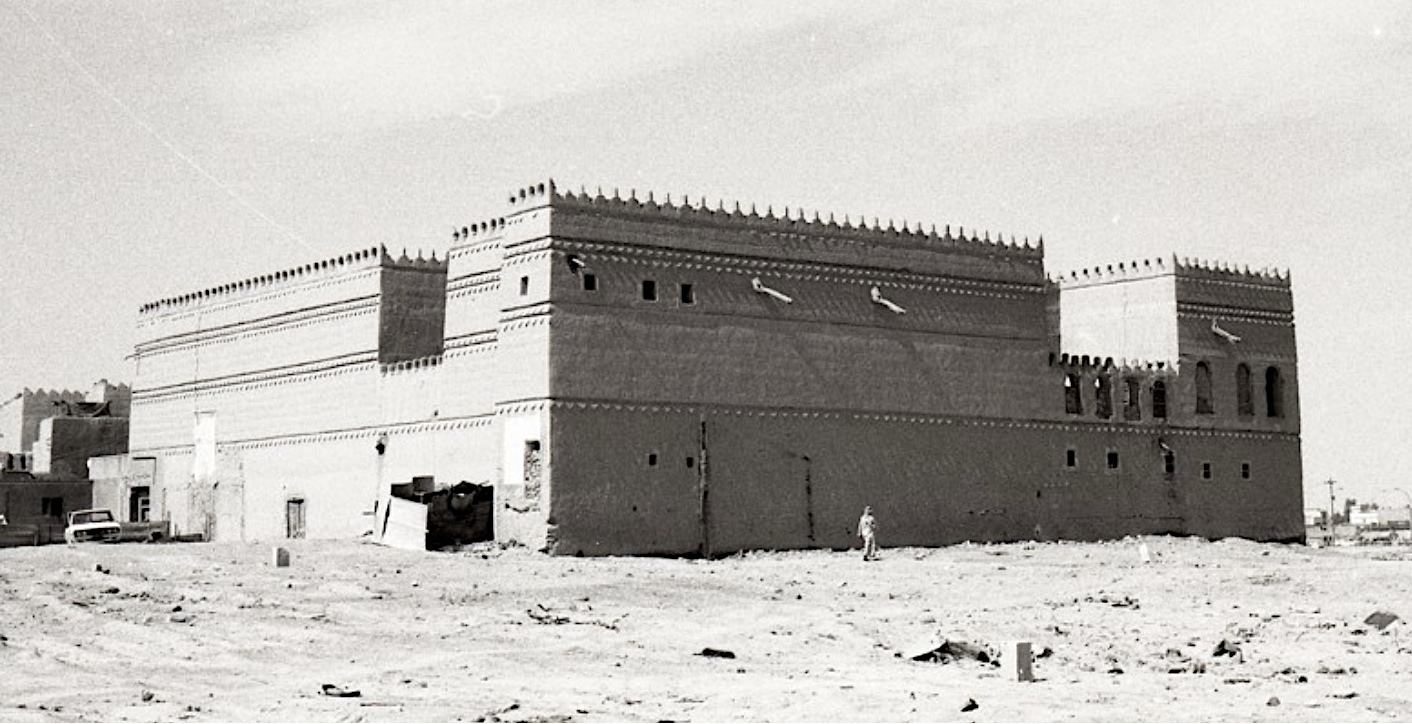
Qaṣr al-Shamsīyya, from the south-east, as seen in 1974.

Qaṣr al-Shamsīyya (Arabic: قصرالشمسية, romanized: Qaṣr al-Shamsīyya) is a ruined palace in the al-Futah district of Riyadh, Saudi Arabia. It was built for Princess Nura bint ʿAbd al-Raḥman (1875–1950), the elder sister of King ʾAbd al-ʿAzīz Ibn Saud. The palace was north of the old town, not far from the Murabba Palace. Among the distinguished female visitors to the palace was Violet Dickson, the wife of H. R. P. Dickson. In his Riyadh map in The Arab of the Desert, Dickson referred to the palace as Qasr Nura, a name found often in other maps and documents. The building stood near the Riyadh Water Tower. By the late 1970s, the building was no longer occupied and had fallen into dereliction.
