= Al-Jami'u Al-Kabeer =

- الجَامِعُ الكَبِير (Arabic)

Religion
- Affiliation: Islam

Location
- Location: Al-Jaddah Al-Kubra, Ad-Diriyah, Riyadh
- Country: Saudi Arabia
- Interactive map of Al-Jami'u Al-Kabeer
- Coordinates: 24°43′22.18″N 46°36′0.86″E

Architecture
- Style: modern Najdi architecture
- Construction cost: SAR 917 million
- Site area: 12,320 m^{2} (132,600 sq ft)

Al-Jami'u Al-Kabeer (Arabic: الجَامِعُ الكَبِير; "The Grand Mosque"), the largest congregational mosque in Diriyah, Riyadh, Saudi Arabia, is located on the southeastern side of Al-Jaddah Al-Kubra. Designed in a modern Najdi architectural style, the mosque spans 12,320 square meters and accommodates 11,400 worshippers, with 5,240 in the indoor prayer hall and 6,160 in the outdoor courtyards, alongside various integrated facilities.

== Architecture ==
Diriyah Company oversees the construction of the mosque in a modern Najdi architectural style, aligning with Diriyah's traditional heritage and the natural environment of Wadi Hanifah. The company signed a construction contract valued at SAR 917 million under Phase 2 of the Diriyah Gate project. Designed by X-Architects, the mosque is being built in collaboration with Al-Majal Al-Arabi Group and MAN Enterprise AlSaudia LLC.

=== Infrastructure ===
In line with all assets across the Diriyah development area, the Grand Mosque in Diriyah's second phase is designed to achieve both LEED Gold and Mostadam Gold green building certifications. This is supported by an innovative 3D mesh ventilation system that allows natural sunlight to enter the building while reducing heat impact.

The mosque will be fully integrated into Diriyah's smart city infrastructure, with its water supply, irrigation, power consumption, sustainability monitoring, Fire and Life Safety (FLS), and security systems all connected directly to the central Diriyah Operations Center to guarantee maximum operational efficiency and long-term sustainability.

== Facilities ==
The mosque features prayer halls for men and women, Wudu areas, a library overlooking Wadi Hanifah, and administrative and operational offices, alongside dedicated parking spaces. Its expansive outdoor courtyards are fully equipped to accommodate worshippers during Ramadan and the Eids. Furthermore, these courtyards will host community and cultural events, including exhibitions, cultural activities, and weekend local product markets, all serving both visitors and worshippers.
