= Al Hamra Palace (Riyadh) =

Former palace of King Saud bin Abdulaziz in Riyadh, Saudi Arabia

Al-Hamra Palace
- القصر الحمراء
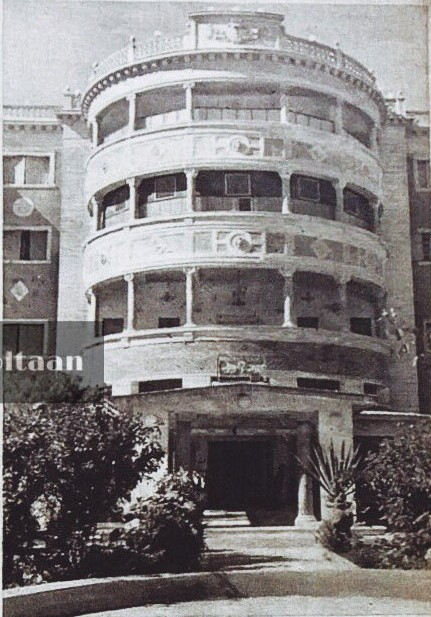
- al-Hamra Palace, 1960
- Interactive map of the Al-Hamra Palace area

General information
- Architectural style: Palladian
- Location: al-Fouta, Riyadh, Saudi Arabia
- Coordinates: 24°38′33″N 46°42′33″E
- Construction started: 1943
- Completed: 1948
- Owner: Boutique Group

Technical details
- Structural system: Reinforced concrete

Design and construction
- Main contractor: Saudi Binladin Group
- Known for: First reinforced concrete structure in Saudi Arabia

Al-Hamra Palace (Arabic: القصر الحمراء, romanized: al-Qaṣr al-Ḥamrāʾ), better known as the Red Palace (Arabic: القصر الأحمر, romanized: al-Qaṣr al-ʾĀḥmar) is a historic palace and a cultural landmark located in the al-Fouta neighborhood of Riyadh, Saudi Arabia. Commissioned in 1943 by King Abdulaziz ibn Saud as a gift to his son and future monarch, Prince Saud bin Abdulaziz, it served as the latter's main residence and workplace from its completion in 1948 until he moved to the al-Nassiriyah Palace in 1956. It is the first reinforced concrete structure in the history of Saudi Arabia and its layout and design were modeled after the historic British Residency building in Hyderabad, India. It was opened to the general public in 2019 after being abandoned for almost 17 years. Since 2022, the palace compound is owned by the Boutique Group, which is set to transform the building into a luxury hotel.

Following the construction of al-Nassiriyah Palace in 1956, Saud handed over the premises of the palace to the Saudi Council of Ministers where it functioned as their main office between 1956 and 1988, hosting numerous foreign dignitaries and head of states during their official visits to the country in that period. The palace temporarily served as a military headquarter during the 1990–1991 Gulf War and later became part of the King Abdulaziz Historical Center (KAHC) in 1999.

The palace hosted many foreign heads of states and officials between 1948 and 1988, such as Shah Mohammed Reza Pahlavi of Iran, President Shukri al-Quwatli of Syria, King Talal bin Abdullah of Jordan, Crown Prince Saif al-Islam al-Badr of North Yemen, President Camille Chamoun of Lebanon, President Gamal Abdel Nasser of Egypt and Prime Minister Jawaharlal Nehru of India.

== History and background ==
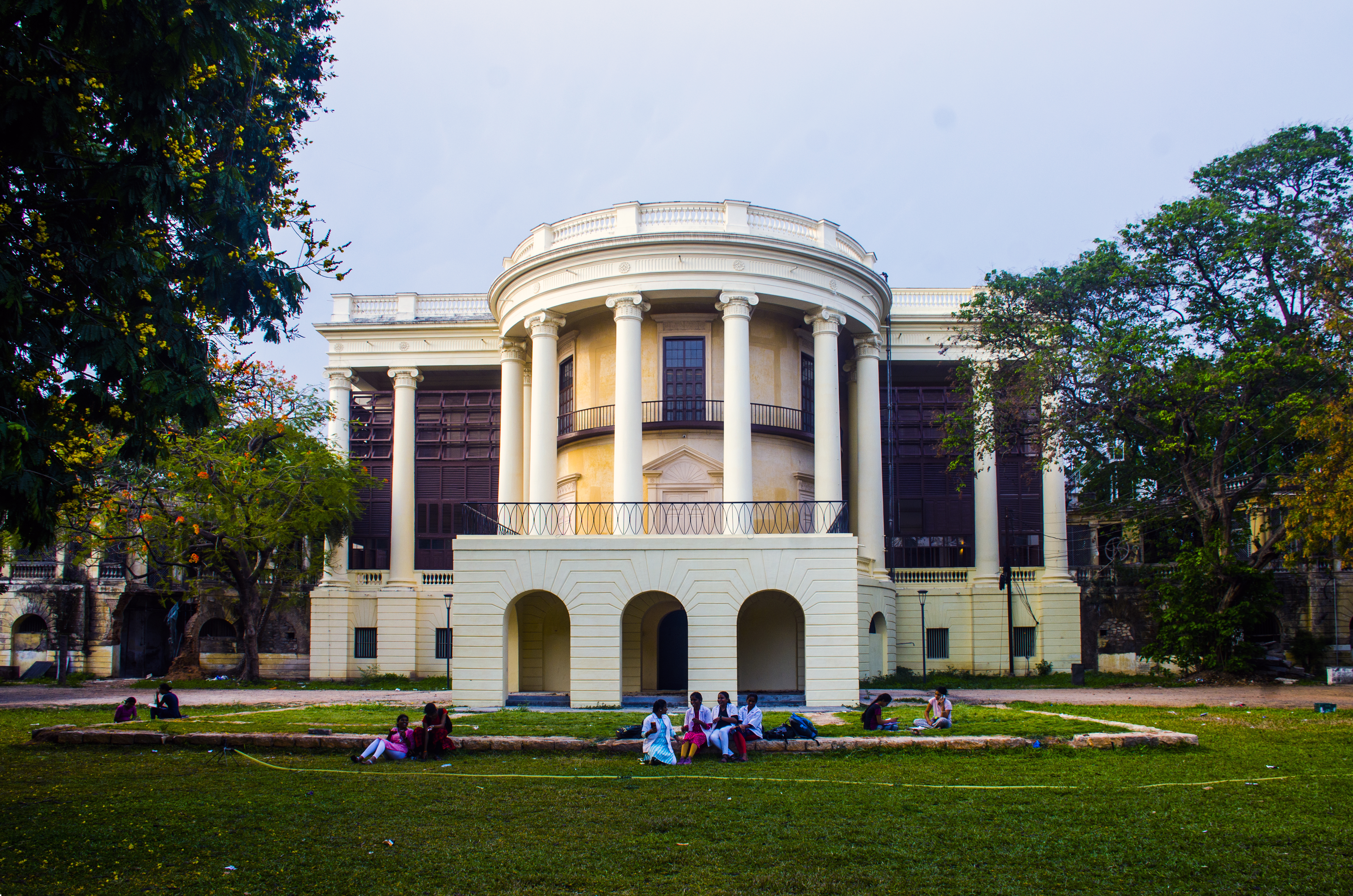
British Residency building in Hyderabad, India, which the al-Hamra Palace in Riyadh was modeled after

King Abdulaziz ibn Saud along with his family members had moved to the Murabba Palace in 1938 as the walled town of Riyadh became more densely populated and congested.

In 1940, Saud bin Abdulaziz, then-heir apparent and Crown Prince of Saudi Arabia, was on an official-visit to the Hyderabad State, one of several princely states of British India. As he came within the sight of the building of the British Residency in the Koti suburb of Hyderabad, he was so impressed by the architecture that he sought to build palaces for himself in a similar fashion upon returning to the country.

In 1943, Saud's two-storey mud palace, which was situated adjacent to the Murabba Palace, witnessed a fire-breakout. Saud and his family were safely evacuated and temporarily moved to another royal residence before the earth-structured palace got razed down and al-Yamamah Secondary School was built on the site.

Abdulaziz commissioned the construction of the al-Hamra Palace in 1943, and awarded the contract to Saudi construction magnate and businessman Mohammed bin Laden. Construction began in 1943 and was completed by 1948.

In 1953, Abdulaziz died, and subsequently had his son Saud bin Abdulaziz succeeding him as the new monarch of Saudi Arabia. Besides his residence, the palace now also began to serve as his official workplace. He commissioned the construction of al-Nassiriyah Palace in the eponymous neighborhood in Riyadh, and moved there upon its completion in 1956.

The palace was later handed over to the country's Council of Ministers and also served as the workplace of Faisal bin Abdulaziz, who was then Crown Prince of Saudi Arabia. In 1966, the Council of Ministers of Saudi Arabia passed a resolution during the reign of King Faisal bin Abdulaziz to renovate the palace.

The main office of the Council of Ministers moved to the al-Yamamah Palace in 1988 during the reign of King Fahd bin Abdulaziz and the palace was later on handed over the Saudi Board of Grievances. In 2002, the headquarters of the Saudi Board of Grievances were relocated and the palace was completely abandoned.

=== Reopening ===
In March 2019, the palace was opened to the general public for the first time where an exhibition was conducted within the premises that displayed belongings of Saudi monarchs.

In January 2022, Saudi crown prince Mohammed bin Salman unveiled a new hospitality firm, Boutique Group, to transform historical places into luxury hotels. In the first phase of the project, three sites were chosen for redevelopment: al-Hamra Palace in Jeddah, the Red Palace and Tuwaiq Palace in Riyadh.

In October 2023, Boutique Group awarded contracts to Aedas architectural firm and Tristan Auer, a company specialized for interior designing.
