= Al Fouta Garden =

Municipal park in the al-Fouta neighborhood of Riyadh, Saudi Arabia

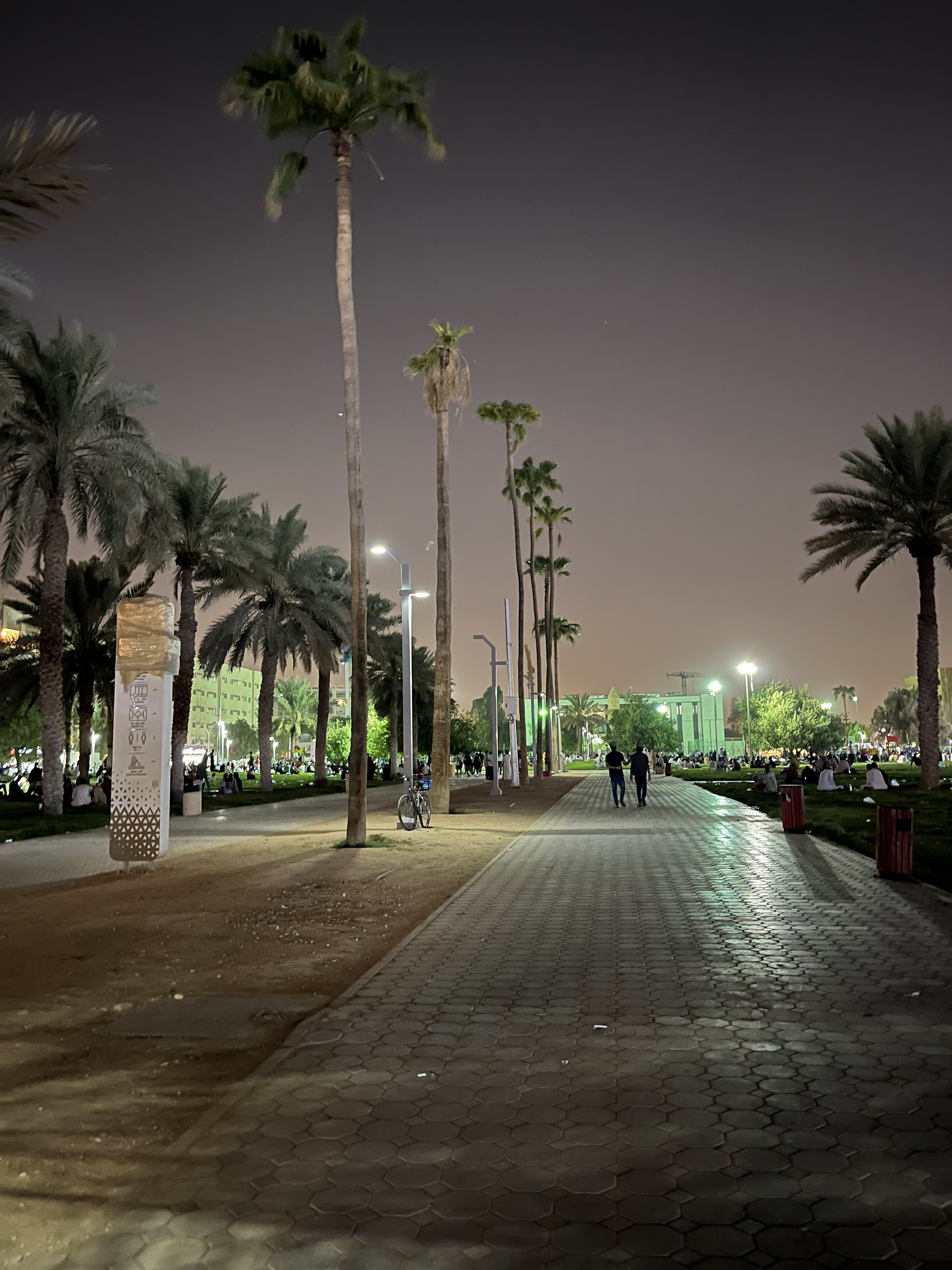
- Al Fouta Garden, 2024
- Interactive map of Al Fouta Garden
- Type: Urban park
- Location: Riyadh, Saudi Arabia
- Coordinates: 24°38′21″N 46°42′33″E
- Opened: 1957; 23 September 2008 (reopening)

Al-Fouta Garden (Arabic: حديقة الفوطة, possibly attributing to Ghouta), is a municipal park in the al-Fouta neighborhood of Riyadh, Saudi Arabia, located south of the Red Palace. Established in 1957 on the grounds of unowned palm groves, it is considered to be the first public park in Riyadh. As per widely held beliefs, the park's name is an aberration of Ghouta, a countryside suburban area of the Syrian capital Damascus. The name was purportedly suggested by a Syrian engineer employed in the Riyadh Municipality who, owing to its verdure, attributed it to the place . However, its historical accuracy has been often contested. The park started to receive large number of visitors after its complete rehabilitation and reopening by Prince Dr. Abdulaziz Ayyaf al-Muqrin in 2008. It is part of the King Abdulaziz Historical Center.
