= Quṣūr al-Fuṭa =

Historic building in Riyadh

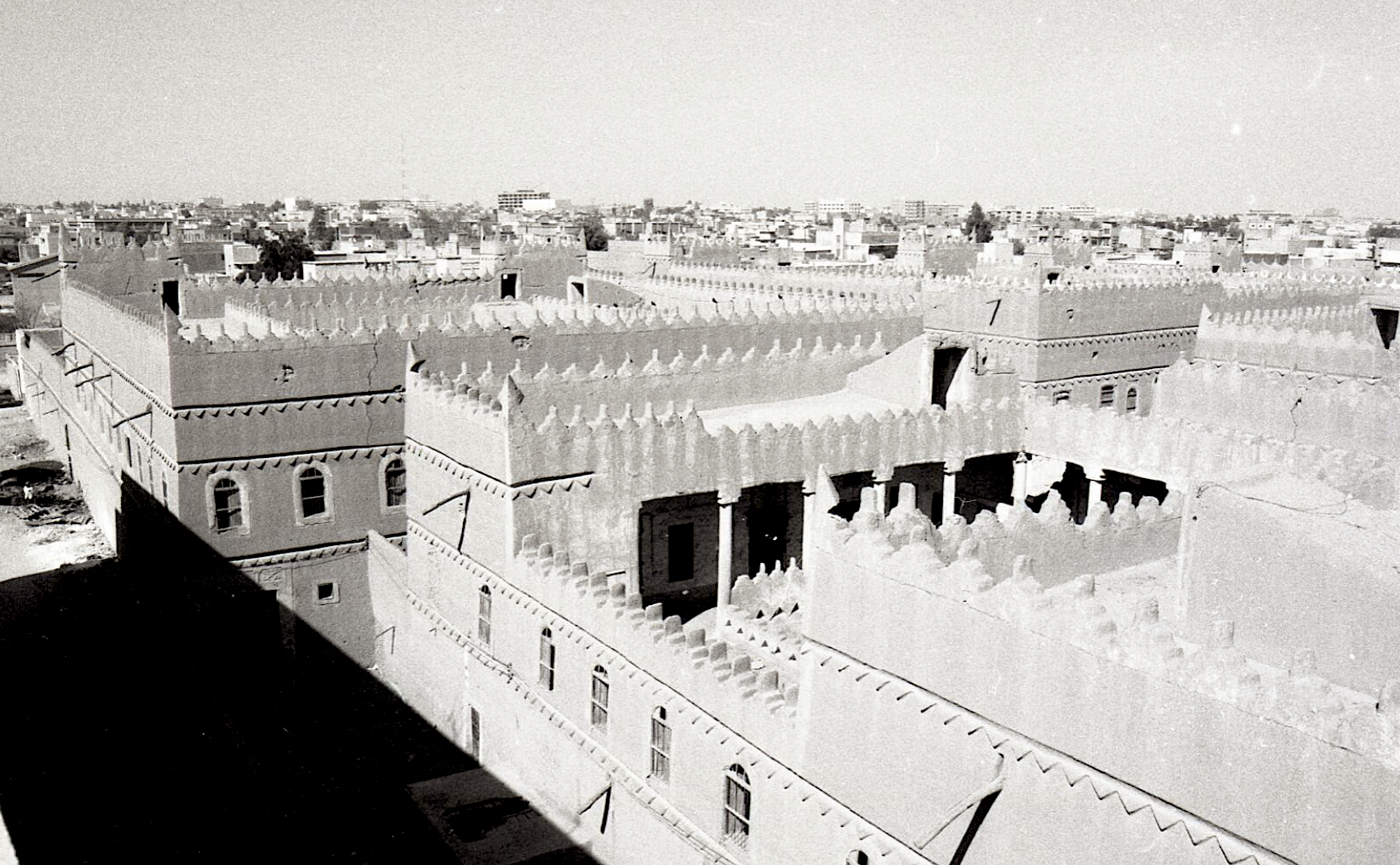
- Palaces in the Quṣūr al-Fuṭa neighbourhood of Riyadh, Saudi Arabia, in 1974
- Interactive map of the Quṣūr al-Fuṭa area

General information
- Architectural style: Najdi architecture
- Location: Riyadh, Saudi Arabia
- Coordinates: 24°38′33″N 46°42′33″E
- Completed: 1930s
- Demolished: 2000s

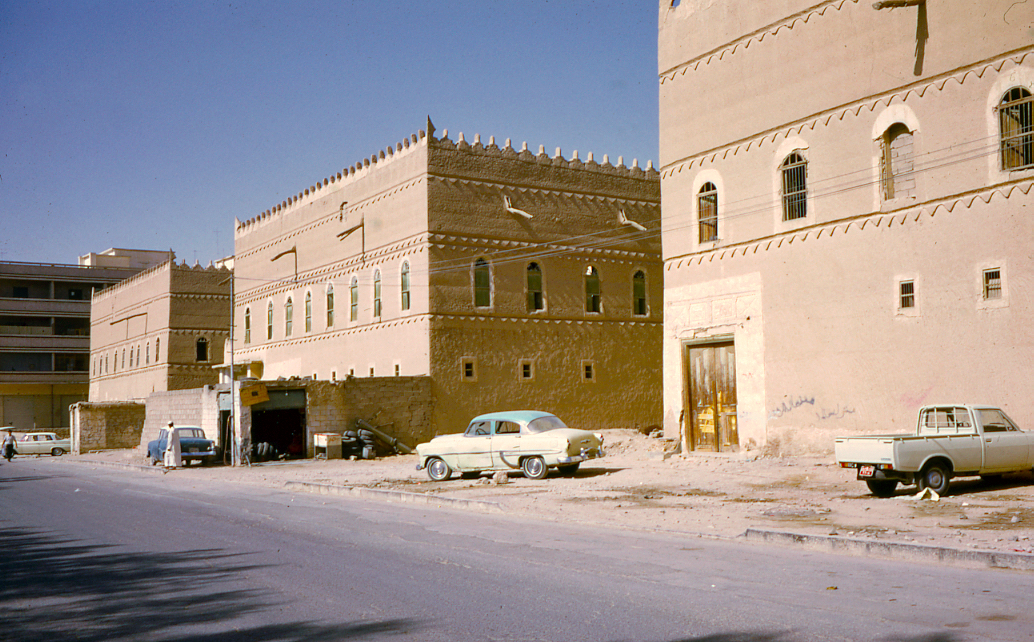
Riyadh, Saudi Arabia. Palaces in al-Futa, in 1970

Quṣūr al-Fuṭa (Arabic: قصور الفوطة, romanized: Quṣūr al-Fuṭa) were a group of five palaces in the al-Futa district of Riyadh, Saudi Arabia. They were built for five sons of King 'Abd al-'Aziz Ibn Saud when they reached the age of marriage. The King ordered the palaces to be built in 1942.

The palaces were located in the Al Fouta neighbourhood, a short distance south of Murabba Palace. An early photograph by Tommy Walters of ARAMCO was published by Facey in his book Riyadh, the Old City.
