= Margab Fort =

Demolished citadel in Riyadh, Saudi Arabia

- قلعة المرقب (Arabic)
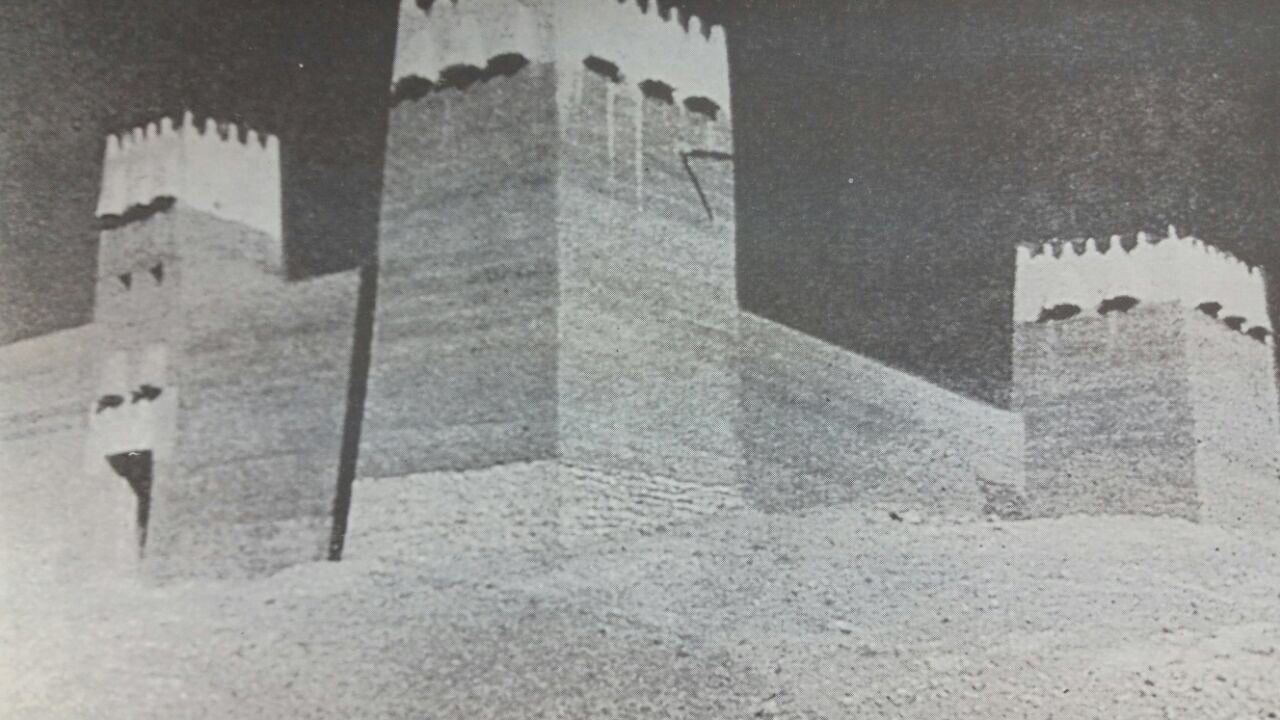
- Margab Fort, 1939
- Interactive map of Margab Fort
- 24°38′5″N 46°43′11″E
- Location: Riyadh, Saudi Arabia

History
- Built: 16th century
- Demolished: 1954–1957

Site notes
- Architectural style: Najdi architecture

Margab Fort (Arabic: قلعة المرقب, lit. 'the watchtower citadel'), also known as al-Zirin Fort (Arabic: قلعة الظيرين), was a citadel in the eastern outskirts of the walled town of Riyadh in present-day Riyadh, Saudi Arabia. It is not known by whom the structure was built, but its origins trace as far back as the 16th century. The fort functioned as a security checkpoint for travelers passing through the town at the time of Second Saudi State in the 19th century. It was first restored by Turki bin Abdullah and the tradition of Iftar cannon was introduced during the reign of Faisal bin Turki. It was again restored in 1936 by King Abdulaziz ibn Saud and finally demolished in the period 1954–1957 during the reign of King Saud bin Abdulaziz when the city underwent expansion. The fort lent its name to the Margab neighborhood in the city's downtown, where it stood.
