= Al-Jaddah Al-Kubra =

Avenue in Diriyah, Riyadh, Saudi Arabia

- Interactive map of Al-Jaddah Al-Kubra
- Native name: الجَادَّةُ الكُبْرَى
- Maintained by: Diriyah Company
- Length: 1,900 m (6,200 ft)
- Location: Ad-Diriyah, Riyadh city
- Coordinates: 24°43′25″N 46°35′28″E
- From: Maidan Ad-Diriyah
- To: King Saud University

Al-Jāddah Al-Kubrā (Arabic: الجَادَّةُ الكُبْرَى; "The Grand Avenue") is an avenue located within Ad-Diriyah development in Riyadh, Saudi Arabia. Spanning 1.9 kilometers, it is the largest avenue in Riyadh. The avenue is 1.9 kilometres (1.2 mi) long, extending east from Maydan Ad-Diriyah, crossing King Khalid Road to the entrance of King Saud University. The project involves real estate investments totaling 236 billion Saudi Riyals.

The architectural design integrates traditional Najdi elements with modern urban infrastructure. It features several key landmarks, including the Grand Mosque, the Royal Diriyah Opera House for performing arts, and the Diriyah Arena, a major event venue with a capacity of up to 20,000 spectators.
