= Qaṣr al-Badi'a =

Historic building in Riyadh

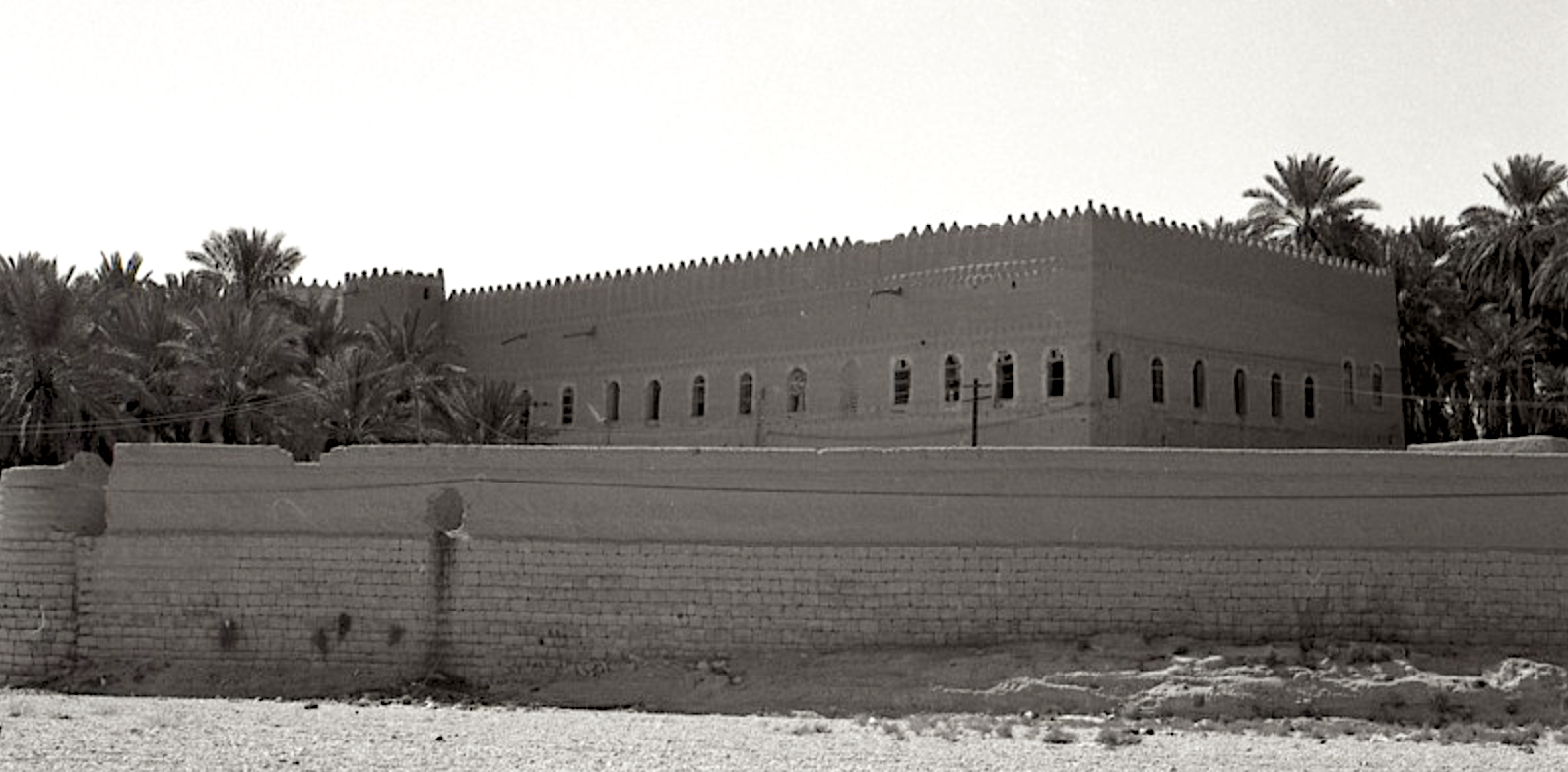
- Qaṣr al-Badi'a in 1974
- Interactive map of the Qaṣr al-Badi'a area

General information
- Architectural style: Najdi architecture
- Location: Riyadh, Saudi Arabia
- Coordinates: 24°36′46″N 46°40′10″E
- Completed: 1935

Qaṣr al-Badi'a (Arabic: قصر البديعة, romanized: Qaṣr al-Badiʿa) is a royal palace in the al-Badi'ah neighbourhood in Riyadh, Saudi Arabia. It was erected outside the old town in the 1930s at the behest of King ʿAbd al-ʿAzīz Ibn Saud. The building stands on the bank of Wadi Hanifa. It served as a guesthouse for visiting dignitaries and as the king's summer residence. From 1954 the building served as a police station and school. More recently it has been restored with documentation carried out by Dārah, the King Abdulaziz Foundation for Research and Archives.

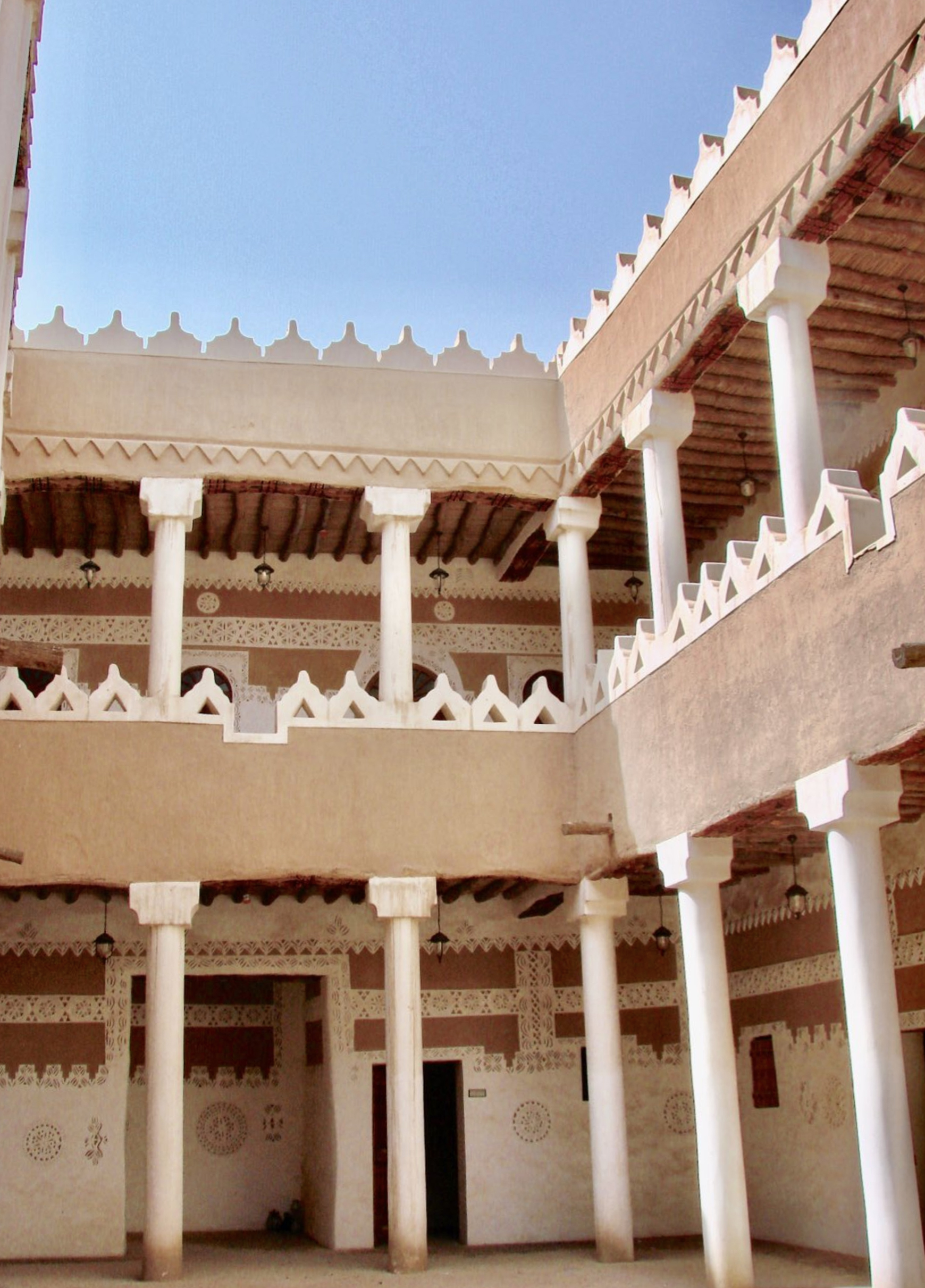
Riyadh, Saudi Arabia. Qaṣr al-Badi'ah, interior, after restoration.
