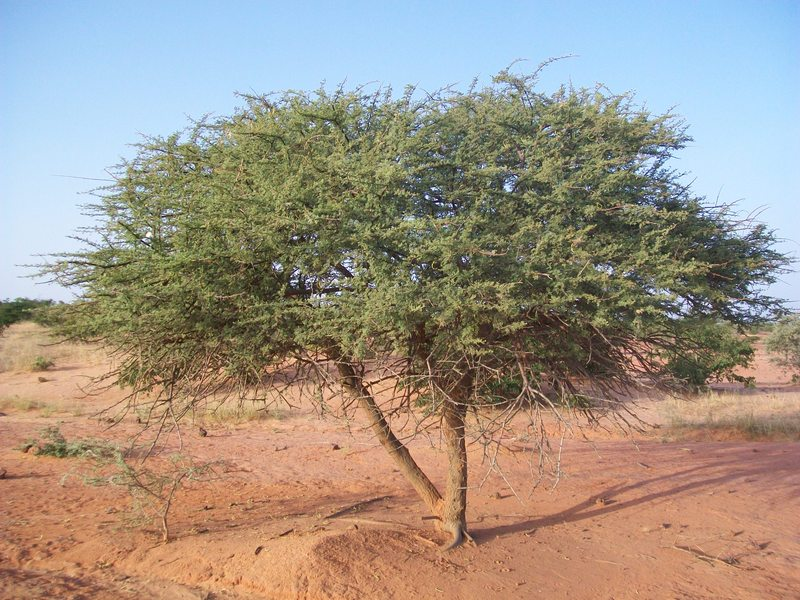

Conservation status
- Least Concern (IUCN 3.1)

Scientific classification
- Kingdom: Plantae
- Clade: Tracheophytes
- Clade: Angiosperms
- Clade: Eudicots
- Clade: Rosids
- Order: Fabales
- Family: Fabaceae
- Subfamily: Caesalpinioideae
- Clade: Mimosoid clade
- Genus: Vachellia
- Species: V. flava

Binomial name
- Vachellia flava (Forssk.) Kyal. & Boatwr.

Synonyms
- Acacia ehrenbergiana Hayne; Acacia ehrenbergii T.Nees; Acacia flava (Forssk.) Schweinf.; Mimosa flava Forssk.

= Vachellia flava =

Species of legume

Vachellia flava, synonym Acacia ehrenbergiana, is a species of drought-resistant bush or small tree, commonly known as salam in Arabic. It is found in the Sahara, the northern Sahel, parts of East Africa, the Arabian Peninsula and Iran.

== Description ==
Vachellia flava is a tall shrub or small tree, seldom exceeding 4 metres (13 ft) in height. It is much branched, the trunk has dark brown, shaggy bark and the branches are green or brown with shiny, peeling bark. The compound leaves are small, with up to four pairs of pinnae, each with eight to twelve pairs of pinnules. Growing in the leaf axils are paired white thorns which are up to 6 centimetres (2.4 in) in length and longer than the leaves. The fluffy, golden-yellow flowers are globular and about 1.5 cm (0.6 in) in diameter. The seeds pods are flattened and curved with constrictions between the seeds. This shrub resembles the red acacia (Vachellia seyal) but that species lives in habitats with higher precipitation and has thorns that are shorter than its leaves. It also resembles Vachellia hockii but that species has leaves that usually have only one or two pinnae.

== Distribution and habitat ==
Vachellia flava is native to the central and southern Sahara and the northern part of the Sahel but is uncommon in the western Sahara. It also occurs in East Africa and Arabia. It is a very drought-tolerant species and can survive in areas with a rainfall range of between 50 and 400 millimetres (2.0 and 15.7 in) per annum. It is typically found growing in shallow depressions and gullies, positions where water can be expected to seep into the ground on the rare occasions when rain falls. The IUCN Red List of Threatened Species lists the plant as being of "Least Concern" as it is common across its large range, the population is stable and it is often the dominant vegetation type in the areas in which it grows. Nevertheless, it is important that it is not over-exploited because of its importance to indigenous people.

== Uses ==
The foliage of Vachellia flava is used for livestock feed and the trees are sometimes pollarded for this purpose. It is an important fodder plant for camels, goats and sheep and the flowers are visited by bees which make "acacia honey" from the nectar. The timber is used for charcoal and firewood, the bark for fibre to be wound into ropes, and the sap produces a low quality gum which oozes from damaged parts of the trunk. An ointment is made from the plant's ground up tissues.
