= Umm Sulaim (Riyadh) =

Umm Sulaim حي أم سليم
- Neighbourhood
- Interactive map of Umm Sulaim
- Coordinates: 24°38′02″N 46°41′53″E
- Country: Saudi Arabia
- City: Riyadh
- Named for: Salam tree

Government
  - Body: Baladiyah Al Shumaisi

Area
  - Total: 90 ha (220 acres)

Language
  - Official: Arabic

Umm Sulaim (Arabic: حي أم سليم, lit. 'mother of salam') is a historic neighbourhood in southern Riyadh, Saudi Arabia, located south of al-Wisham and west of ad-Dirah in the sub-municipality of al-Shumaisi. Covering an area of 90 hectares, it was established around 1946 and is named after several drought resistant bushes, known as salam, that were once found in the area.
