= Al Badiah (Riyadh) =

Al Badiʼah حي البديعة
- Neighbourhood
- Interactive map of Al Badiʼah
- Coordinates: 24°37′04″N 46°40′49″E
- Country: Saudi Arabia
- City: Riyadh

Government
  - Body: Baladiyah Al Shumaisi

Language
  - Official: Arabic

Al Badiʼah (Arabic: حي البديعة) is a historic neighborhood and a subject of Baladiyah al-Shumaisi in south-west Riyadh, Saudi Arabia. It is bordered to al-Shumaysi and al-Jarradiyah to the east and Ulayshah neighborhood to the north and today is considered a part of the old city area which hosts several traditional markets. The historic Qaṣr al-Badi'ah palace of King Abdulaziz ibn Saud is situated in the neighborhood.
