= Al Shumaisi Sub-Municipality =

Baladiyah Al-Shumaisi بلدية الشميسي
- Baladiyah
- Country: Saudi Arabia
- City: Riyadh
- Boroughs: List: Al Rafiah Al-Hada Al-Sharqiyah Al-Nasiriyah Al-Siyah Al-Wisham Al-Namudhajiyah Al-Maazer Al-Mutamarat Al-Badiah Umm Salim Al-Shumaisi Al-Jarradiyah Al-Fakhiriyah Al-Ulayshah
- Website: shemesy.alriyadh.gov.sa

Al-Shumaisi Sub-Municipality (Arabic: بلدية الشميسي) is one of 16 sub-municipalities of Riyadh, Saudi Arabia, which consists of 15 neighborhoods and districts, including ash-Shumaysi, Ulaysha, Umm Salim, al-Jarradiyah and Siyah and is responsible for their development, planning and maintenance.

== Neighborhoods and districts ==
- Al Rafiah
- Al-Hada
- Al-Sharqiyah
- Al-Nasiriyah
- Al-Siyah
- Al-Wisham
- Al-Namudhajiyah
- Al-Maazer
- Al-Mutamarat
- Al-Badiah
- Umm Salim
- Al-Shumaisi
- Al-Jarradiyah
- Al-Fakhiriyah
- Al-Ulayshah
