= Al Fouta =

Historic neighborhood in central Riyadh, Saudi Arabia

Al-Fouta الفوطة
- Neighbourhood
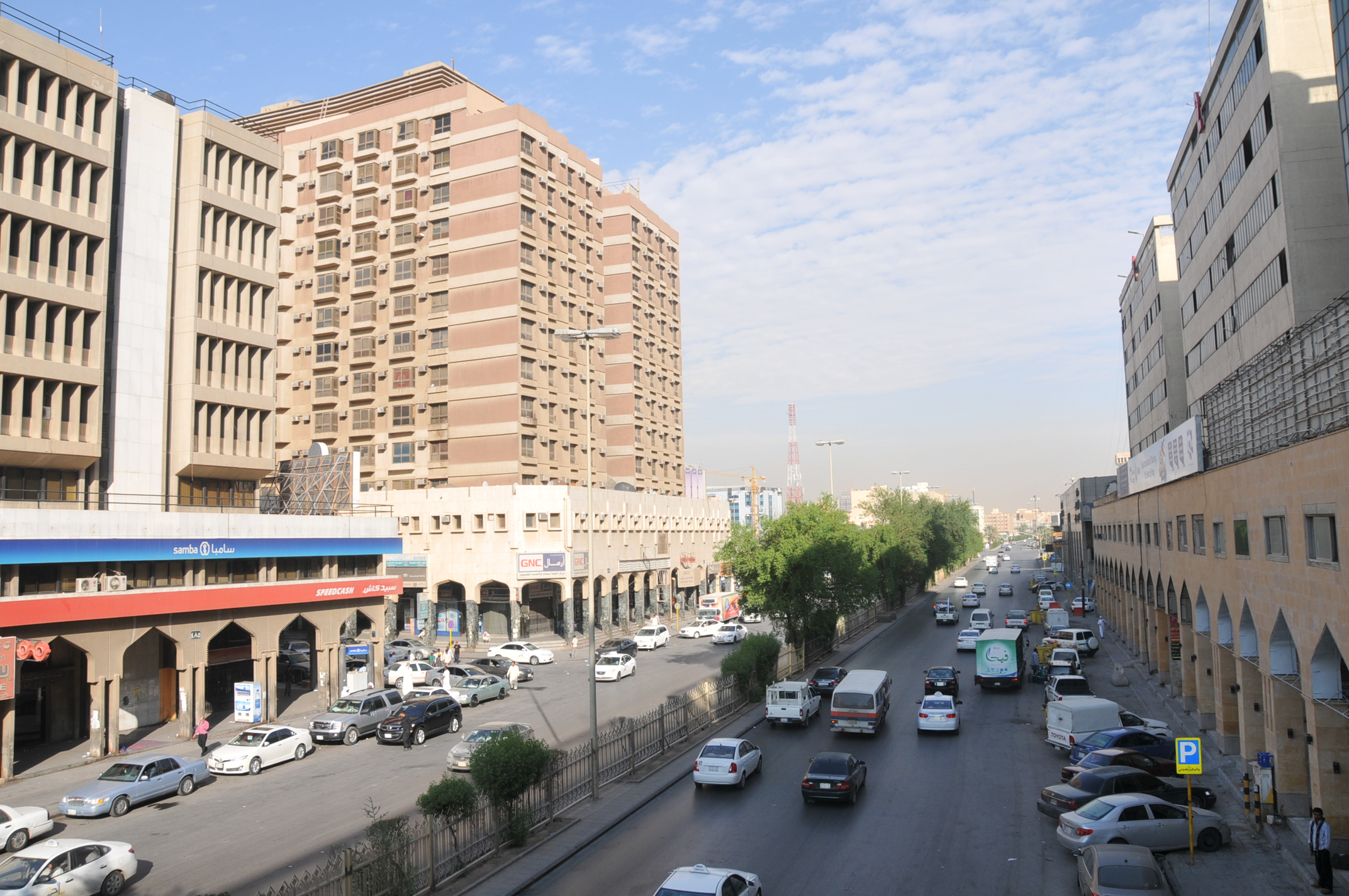
- KAHC (Clockwise from bottom-right: Riyadh Water Tower and al-Watan Park, the Palm Oasis)
- Interactive map of Al-Fouta
- Location within Saudi Arabia Location within Asia
- Coordinates: 24°38′33″N 46°42′33″E
- Country: Saudi Arabia
- City: Riyadh
- Named for: Al Fouta Park

Government
  - Body: Al Malaz Sub-Municipality

Area
  - Total: 1.1145 km^{2} (0.4303 sq mi)

Language
  - Official: Arabic

Al-Fouta (Arabic: الفوطة), alternatively transliterated as al-Futa, is a neighborhood in central Riyadh, Saudi Arabia, located south of al-Murabba and north of al-Dirah in the sub-municipality of al-Malaz. It emerged in the 1940s following the construction of the Red Palace for then Saudi crown prince Saud bin Abdulaziz and al-Futa Palaces. It popularly hosts the Riyadh Water Tower, one of the notable landmarks in the city as well as the rest of the southern portion of the King Abdulaziz Historical Center, including the eponymous al-Fouta Park. As the neighborhood is bounded by al-Batʼha Street to the east, its eastern strip partially forms part of the al-Batʼha commercial area.

The neighborhood is unofficially divided into two sections, Fouta East (Arabic: الفوطة الشرقية) and Fouta West (Arabic: الفوطة الغربية).
