= Najdi architecture =

Historic architectural style native to Najd region, Saudi Arabia

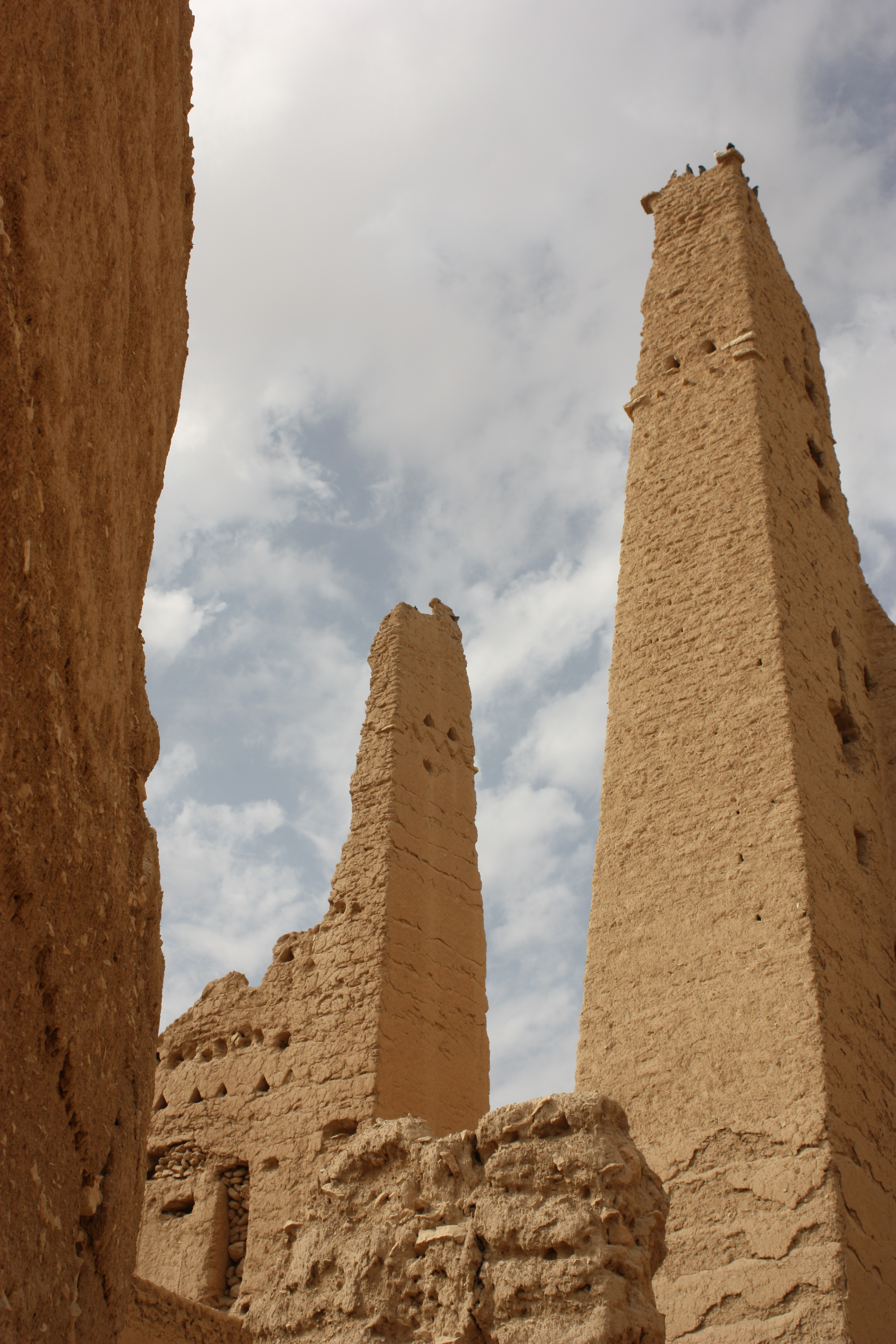
Ruins of Qasr al-Salwa in Diriyah

Najdi architecture (Arabic: العمارة النجدية) is a vernacular architecture indigenous to the Najd region of modern-day Saudi Arabia. The style flourished roughly between 13th and 18th centuries and is known for its desert adaptive urban patterns with low-contour earth-structured mudbrick buildings that are characterized by elements such as triangular or rectangular openings (furjat) and battlements (shurfat) as well as peepholes projecting outward from the main façade (tarma). The presence of a central courtyard and open spaces also forms a distinct part of the architectural style.

The influence of Najdi style can be felt in neighboring regions, such as Kuwait and inland Qatar.

== Construction method ==
One of the most common types of construction in the Najd was the use of clay and mudbrick as well as other materials including stones, tamarisk and palm trees. Given the scarce availability of stones and different varieties of trees suitable for construction, the buildings were built with mud or sun-dried bricks and finished with the application of mud plaster. The walls were very thick to isolate the interior spaces from extreme heat and to achieve greater structural integrity. The mud bricks, composed of a mixture of water, straw, and other fibers, highlight the relationship between architectural artifice and naturalness. Straw and natural elements do not have an ornamental function, but they creep into the walls, creating efflorescence and contributing to the breakdown of the facade.

== Architectural features ==
=== Furjat or luhuj ===
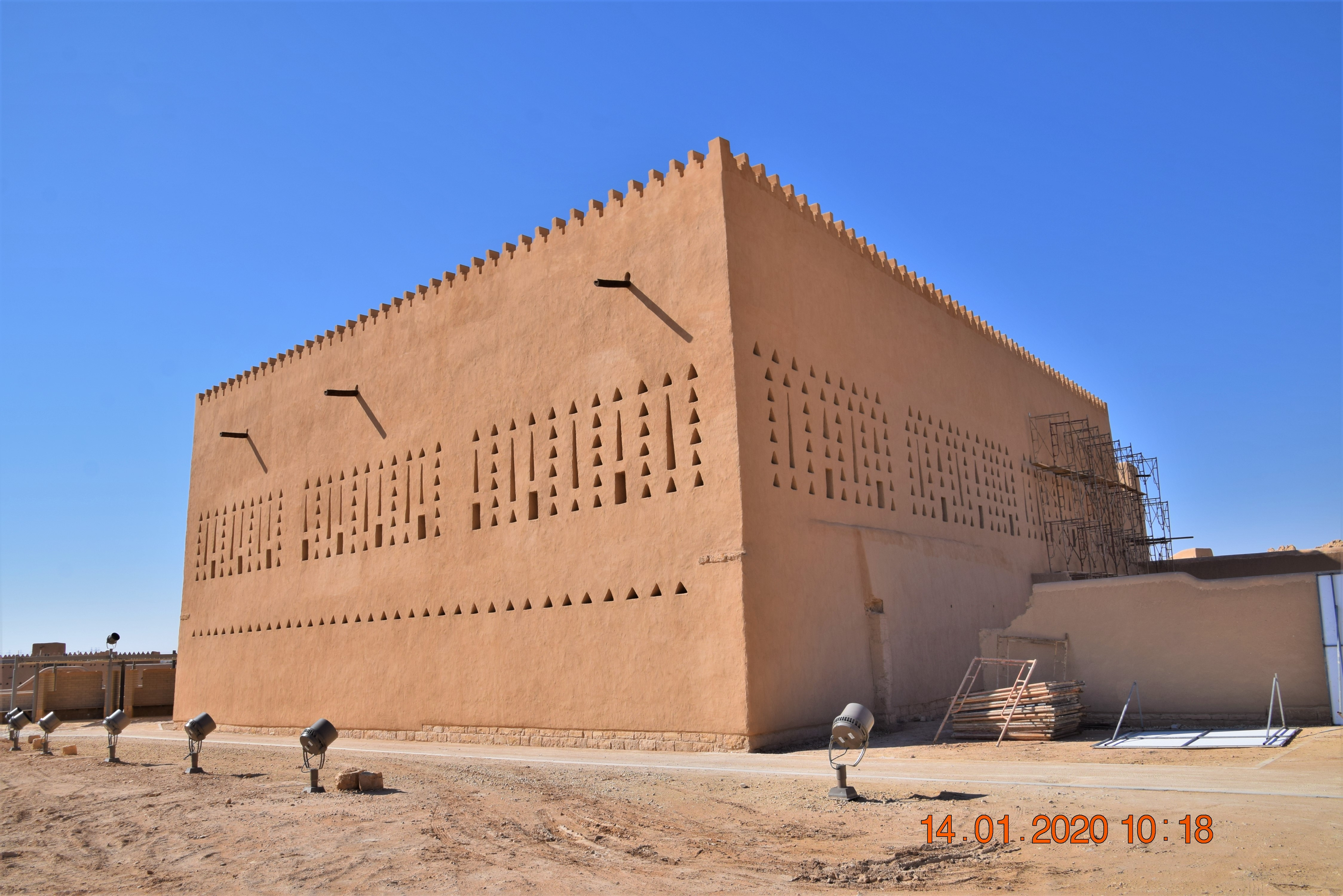
Rectangular and triangular openings in the Palace of Saad ibn Saud in Diriyah

The furjat (Arabic: فُرجات) or luhuj (Arabic: لُّهُوج) are small rectangular, triangular, square and arrow openings pierced in a wall to promote adequate air movement, lighting to the interior spaces, and the view from inside to outside. These small openings do not have a purely decorative function but are arranged vertically, horizontally, or in stacks, creating a pattern on the facade with different dispositions and densities. The different arrangements of the openings meet the different socio-cultural needs of the population while preserving the technical and environmental characteristics. Furjat also functions as a ventilation structure to isolate hot toxic exhaust gases or smoke.

=== Shurfat ===
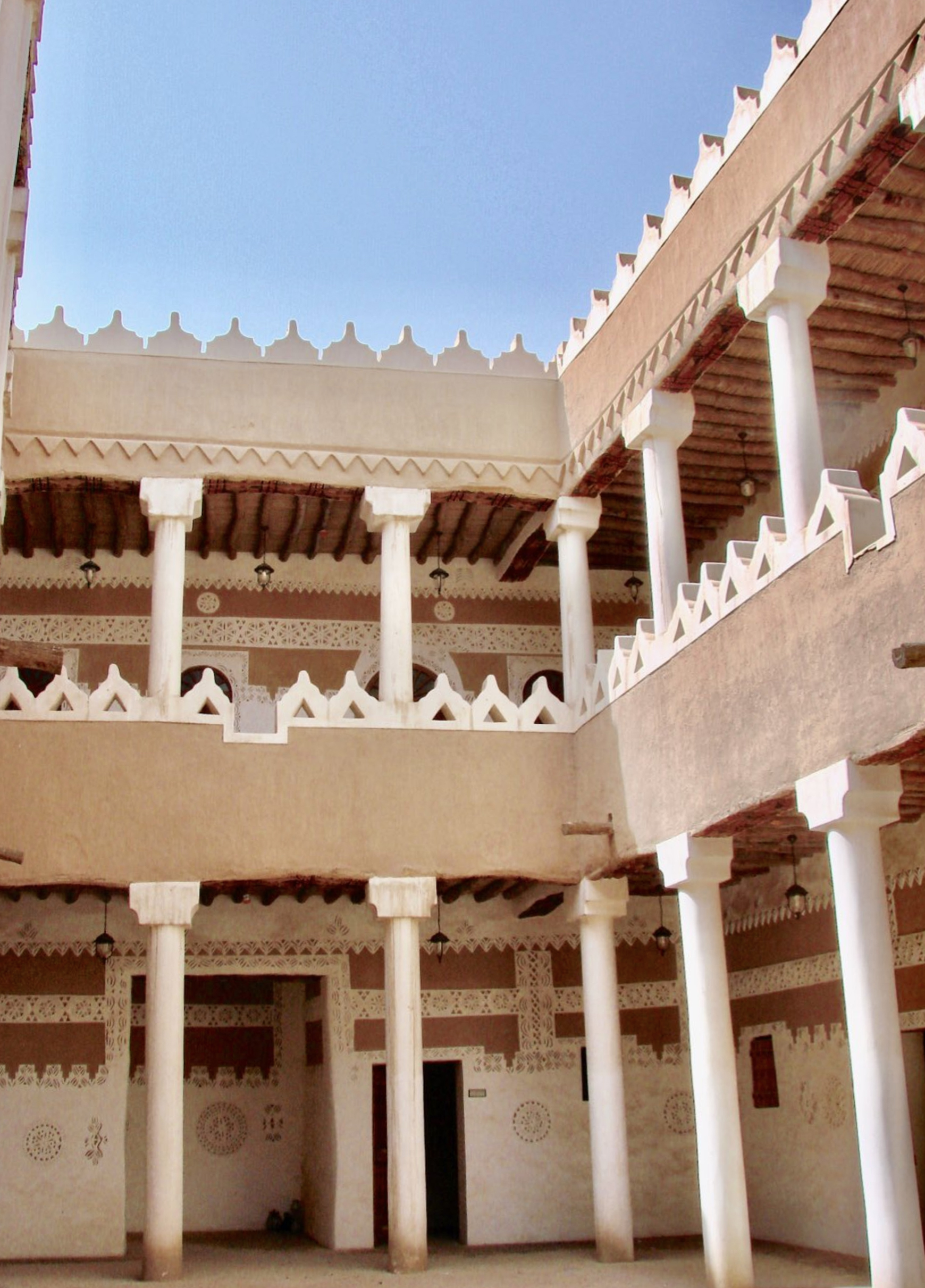
Battlements (shurfat) on the railings of Qaṣr al-Badi'a in Riyadh

The shurfat (Arabic: الشرفة) are battlements covered in plaster at the top of a wall or a railing. The hand-molded and layered walls are tapered upwards and finished in a crenelated shape. These decorative elements in the shape of triangles or arrows, sometimes alternating between full and empty, create a proportional rhythm by acting as a parapet for the rooftop and, in turn, protecting the facades from rainwater. It is customary to find a horizontal strip engraved in the wall under these elements, with triangles underneath, always upside-down, as protection from rainwater.

=== Tarma ===
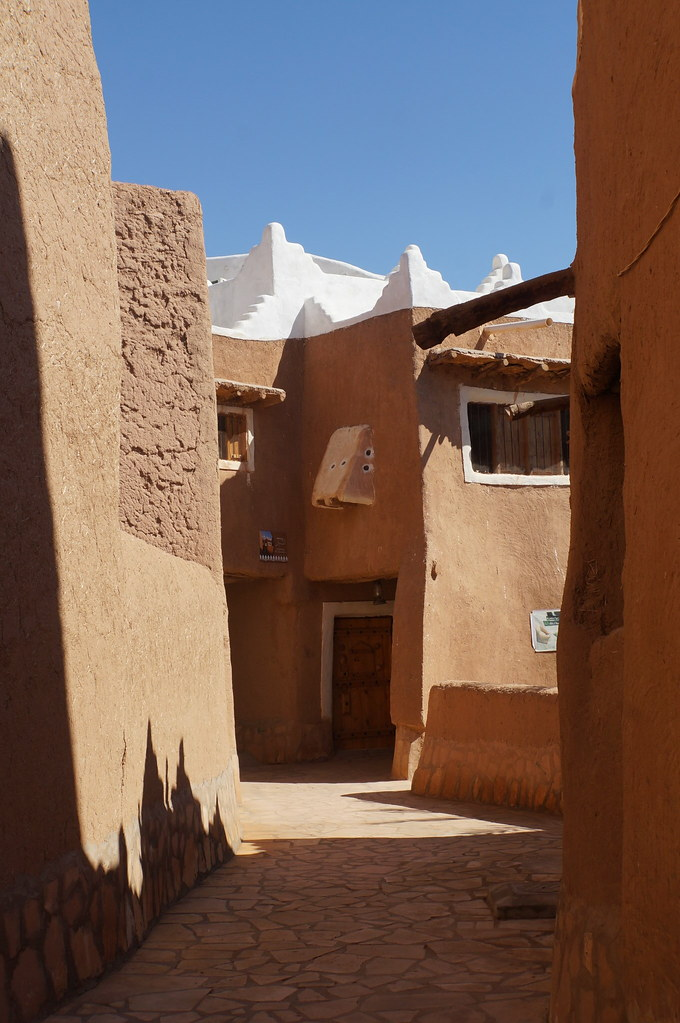
A tarma on a traditional house

The tarma (Arabic: الطرمة) has an observation function and is usually arranged on the second floor and above the door of the facade of the buildings, working as a peephole to observe people outside the building without being seen inside. It comes in different shapes and sizes and also has a symbolic value since it helps users of the urban spaces to identify the building and its entrance through the various forms of the element. The size of the interior spaces and the width of the street the building faces also affect the size and shape of the tarma.

=== Al-Bab ===
The al-bab (Arabic: الباب) in Arabic generally translates to a door. They function as an access element to the building and are very particular in design and are usually square in size, single-sided made of wood or palm trees. Some entrance doors are colored, engraved, and painted with geometric motifs, embellished with repetitive designs of a symbolic nature, and very pleasant in style and composition. The door and its visual features, use of color, and ornamentation support non-verbal communication by guiding the visitor to the building.

== Types of structures ==
Najdi architecture is categorized into three main types: religious, civil, and military.

=== Religious architecture ===
==== Mosques ====
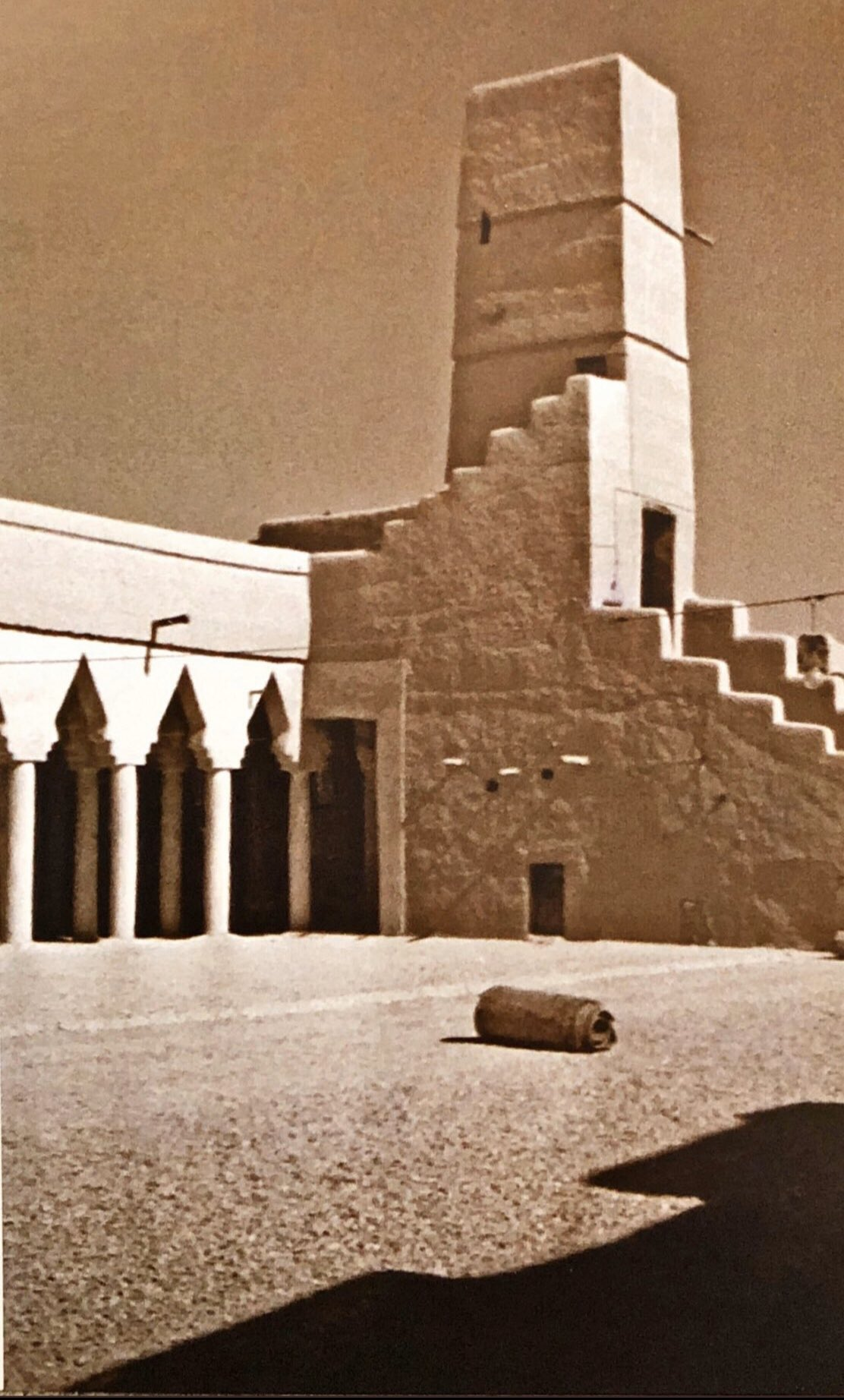
Courtyard and minaret of Dakhna Grand Mosque in Riyadh, 1952

Mosques are the main place of worship in Islam. Muslims are called to prayer five times a day and participate in prayers together as a community, facing towards the qibla (direction of prayer). Every neighborhood normally had one or many mosques in order to accommodate the spiritual needs of its residents. Historically, there was a distinction between regular mosques and "Friday mosques" or "grand mosques", which were larger and had a more important status by virtue of being the venue where the khutba (sermon) was delivered on Fridays. Friday noon prayers were considered more important and were accompanied by preaching, and also had political and social importance as occasions where news and royal decrees were announced, as well as when the current ruler's name was mentioned.

Traditional mosques built in the Najd are constructed mostly using raw materials and are influenced by four main factors; climate, locally sourced building materials, already-existing skill sets, and the sub-cultural background of the builder. Materials used in the construction typically include mud, timber, tamarisk tree log beams, stone, clay, and thatch.

Mosques in the Najd have historically been devoid of decorations in order to resemble the puritanical nature of the Salafi sect of Islam adhered by the locals. Triangular or rectangular openings known as furjat are considered to be one of the features of the mosques built in Najdi architectural style. Other distinctive features also include carved wall panels, an arcade element, colonnade and a well-designed mihrab with intricate floral gypsum motifs. Unlike the other parts of the Islamic world, domes are usually found to be absent in Najdi mosques. The mosque's external characters are also defined by cylindrical or rectangular minarets connected with a staircase.

Four components comprise the architectural style of Najdi mosques, that are al-sarha (courtyard), al-misbah (prayer hall), al-sath (roof) and al-khalwa (basement). The khalwa is mainly used to accommodate worshippers during winters.

=== Civil architecture ===
==== Houses ====
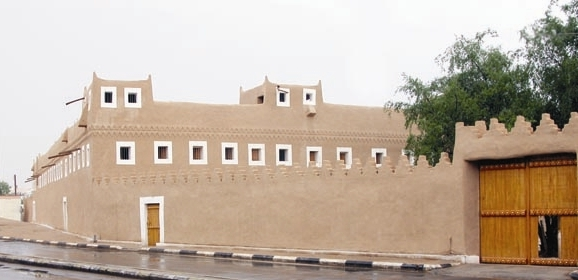
Bassam mansion in Unaizah

Traditional houses in the Najd are built from mudbricks whereas the roofs and doors made of tamarisk wood. They are usually low-countour, comprising one or two floors around an inner courtyard.

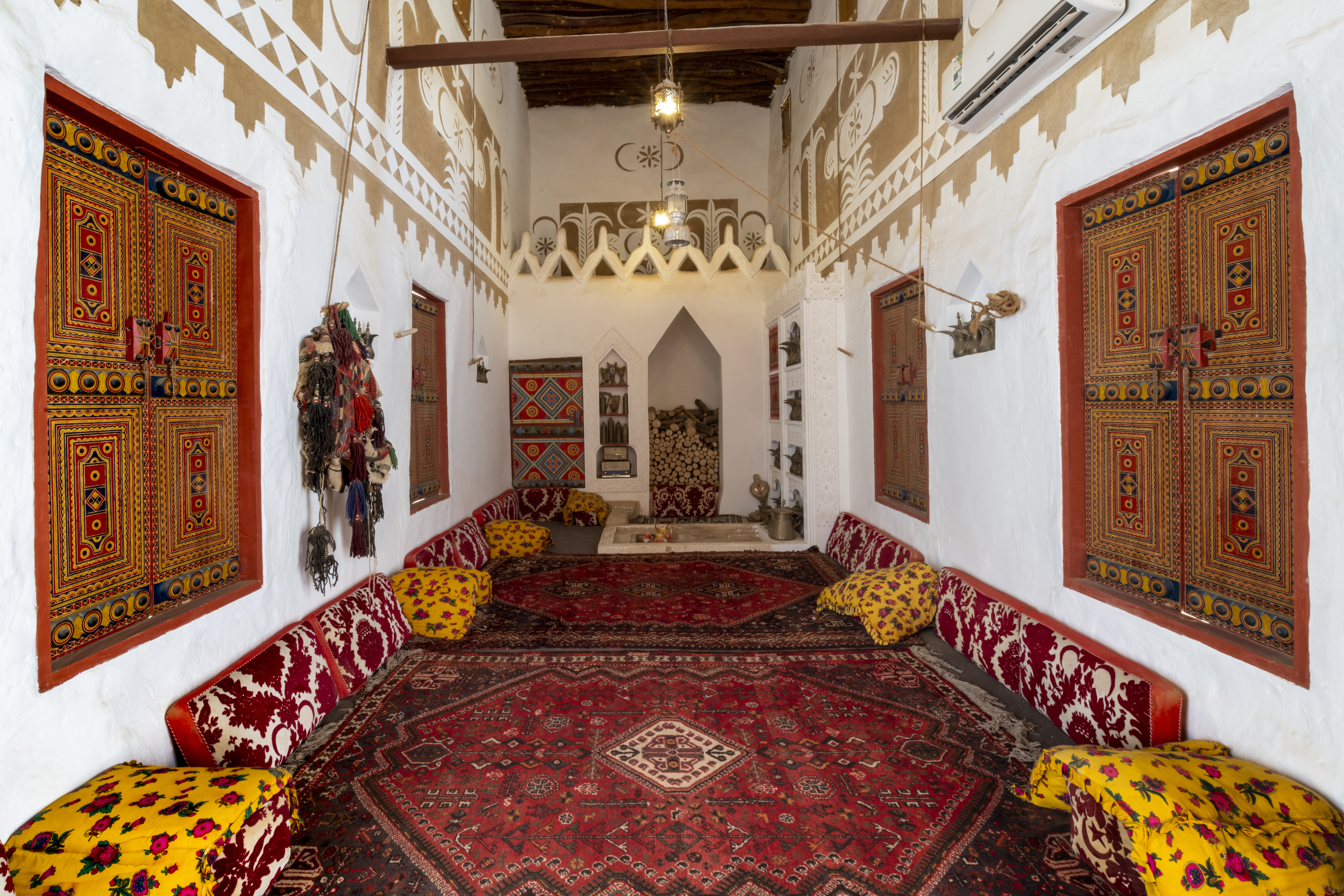
A traditional majlis in Unaizah

The exterior of the houses are characterized by lack of ornamentation and architectural details. However, these details increase in the interior, where ornaments mostly reflect the social status of the owner of the house. The decoration of al-qahwa (majlis) is given special attention to, which demonstrates generosity and excitement in receiving the guests.

== Gallery ==
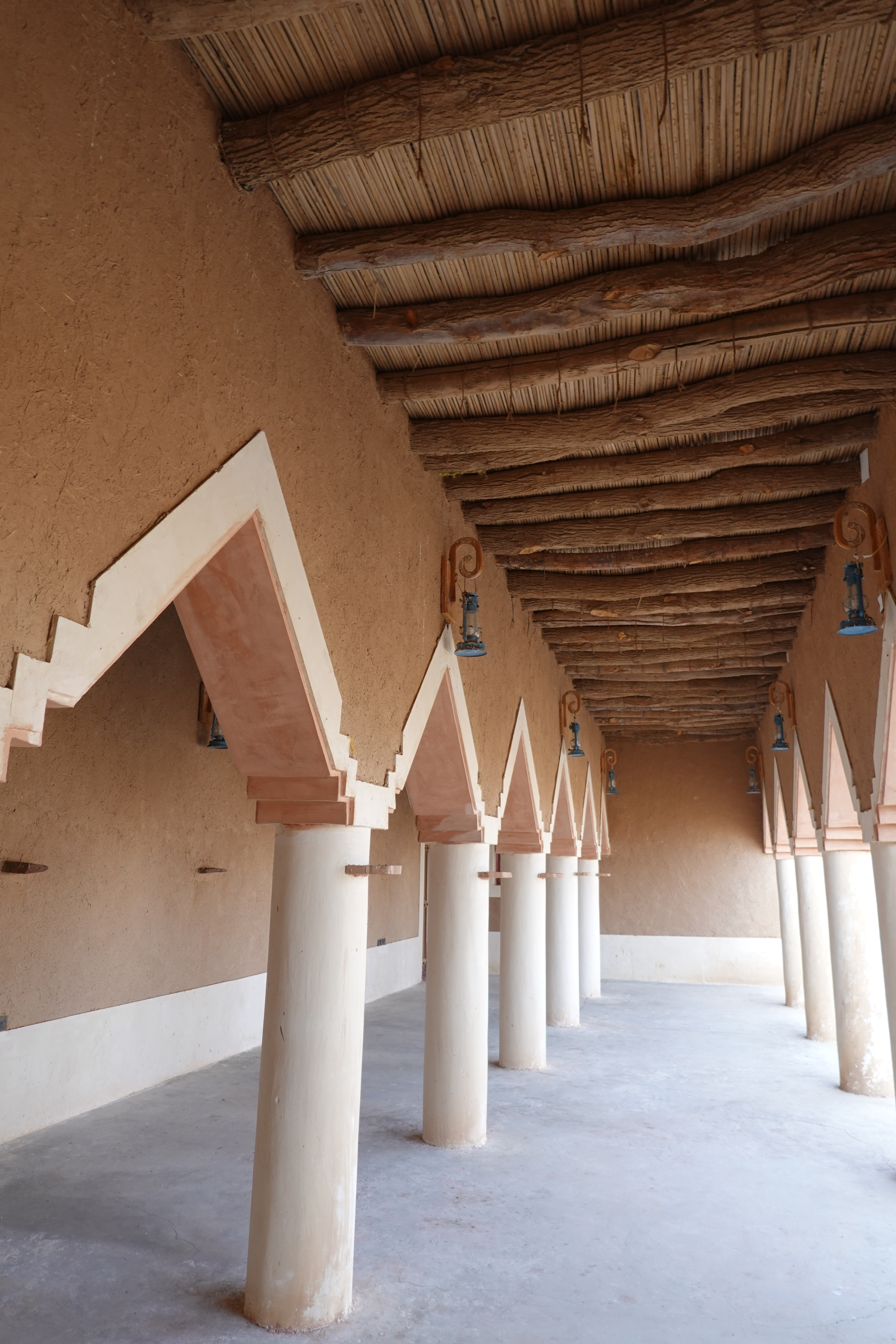
The khalwa of an old mosque in al-Shinana, near al-Rass

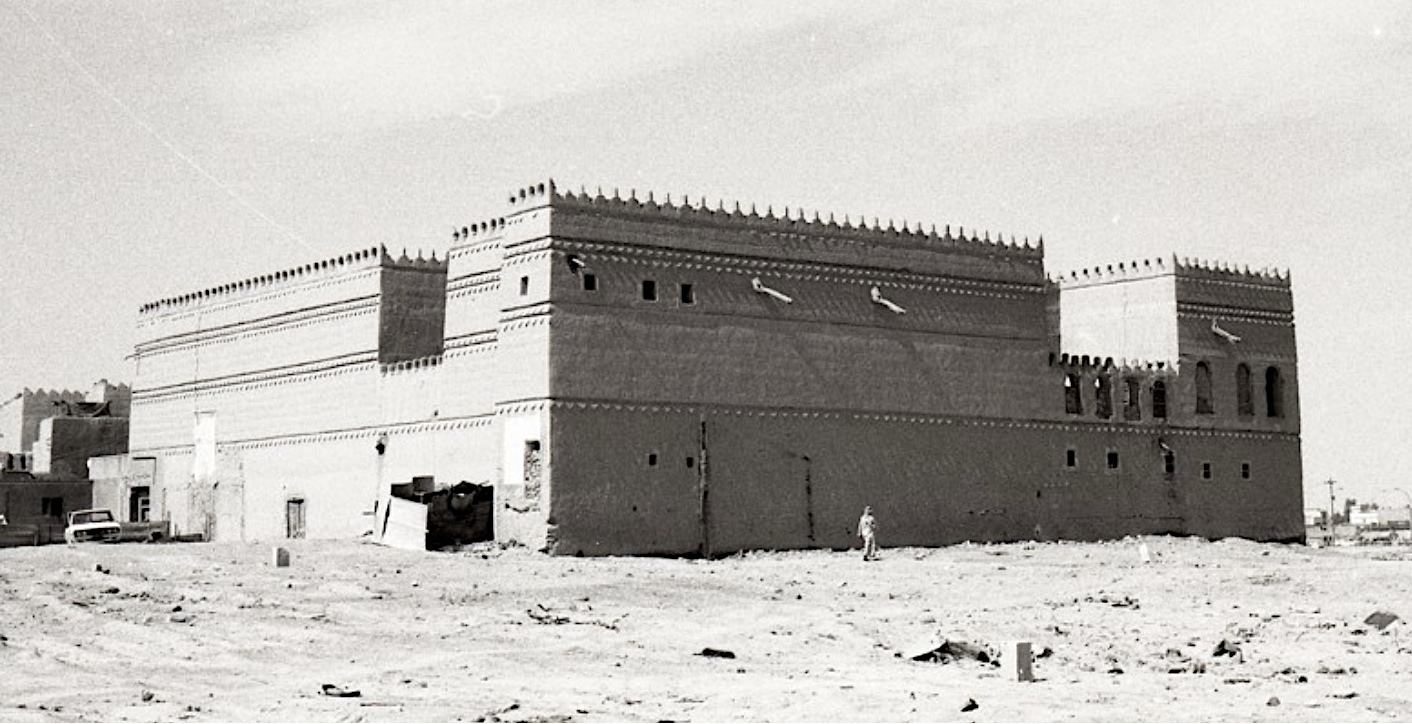
Qaṣr al-Shamsīyya in Riyadh, 1974

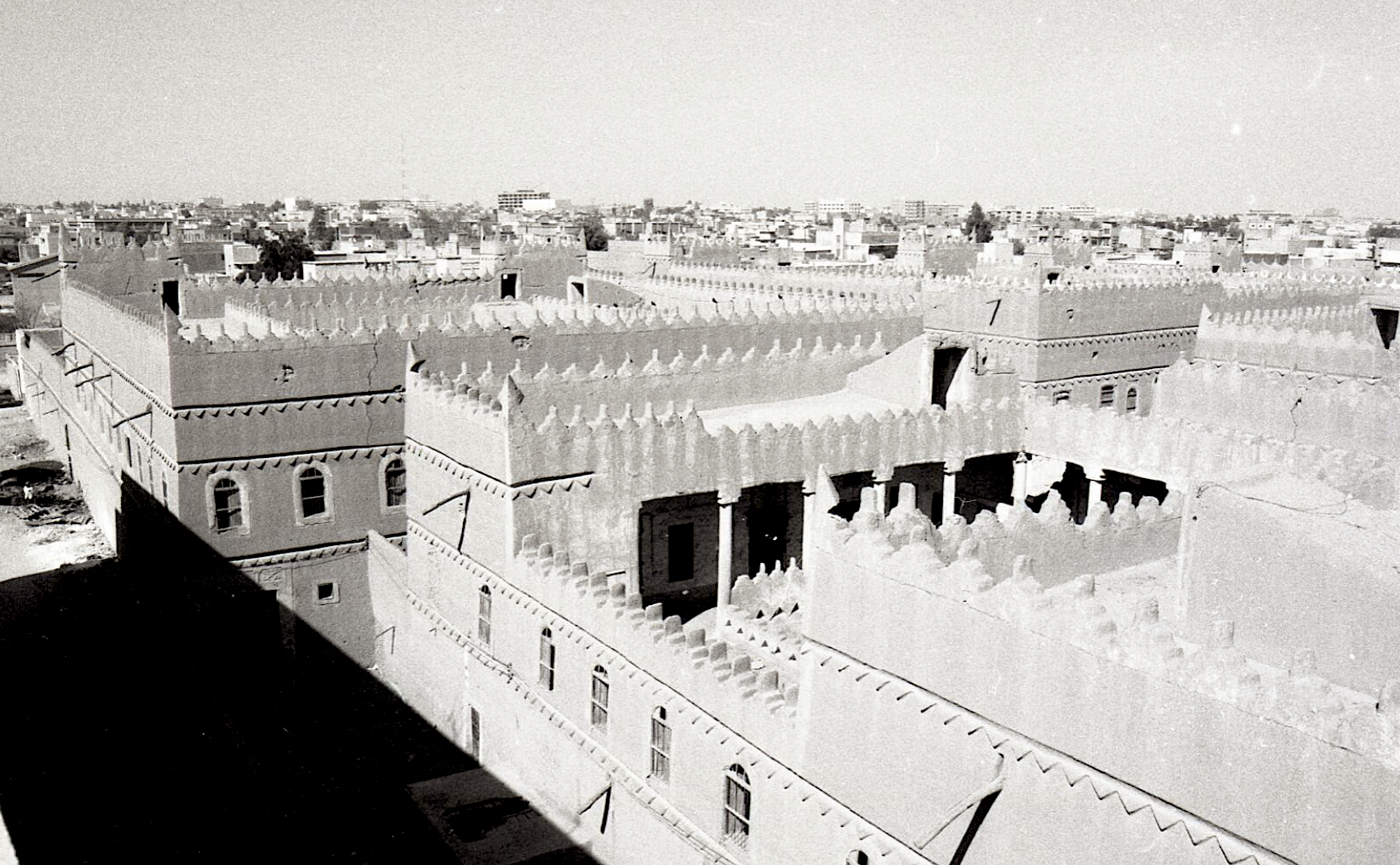
Quṣūr al-Fuṭa in Riyadh, 1974

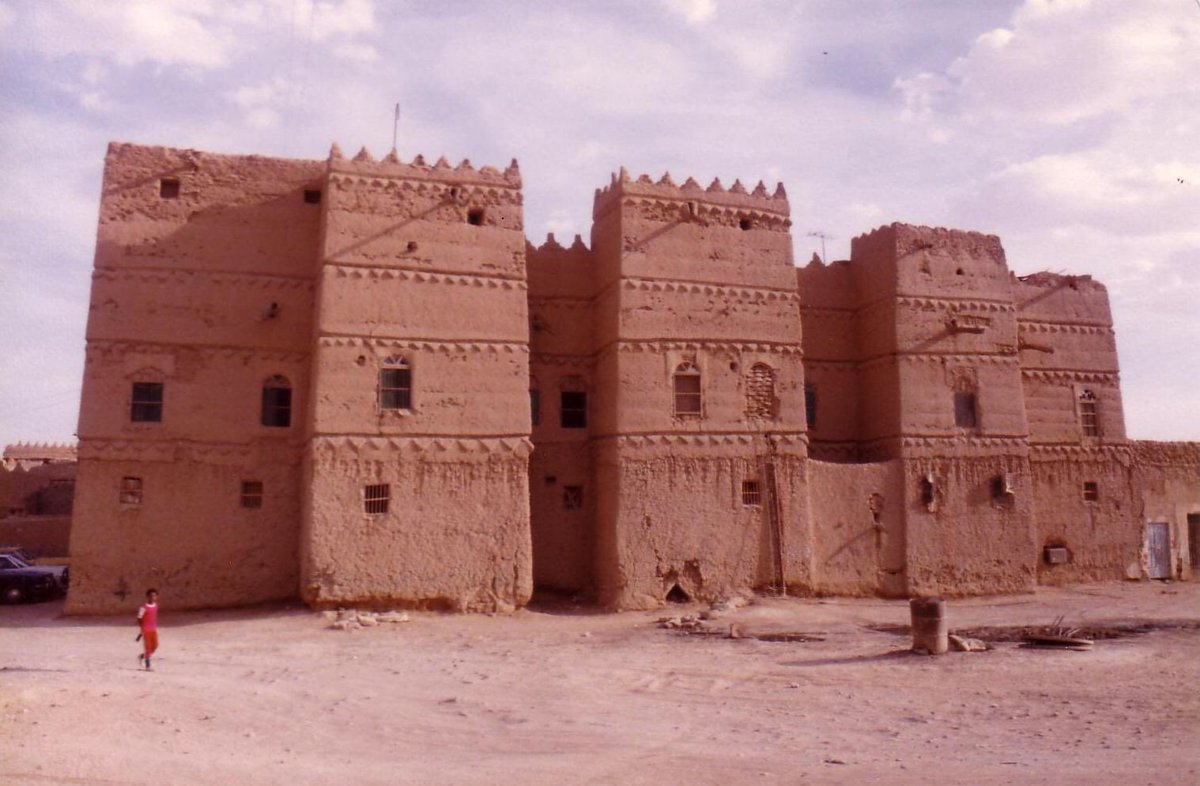
Murabba Palace in Riyadh, 1980

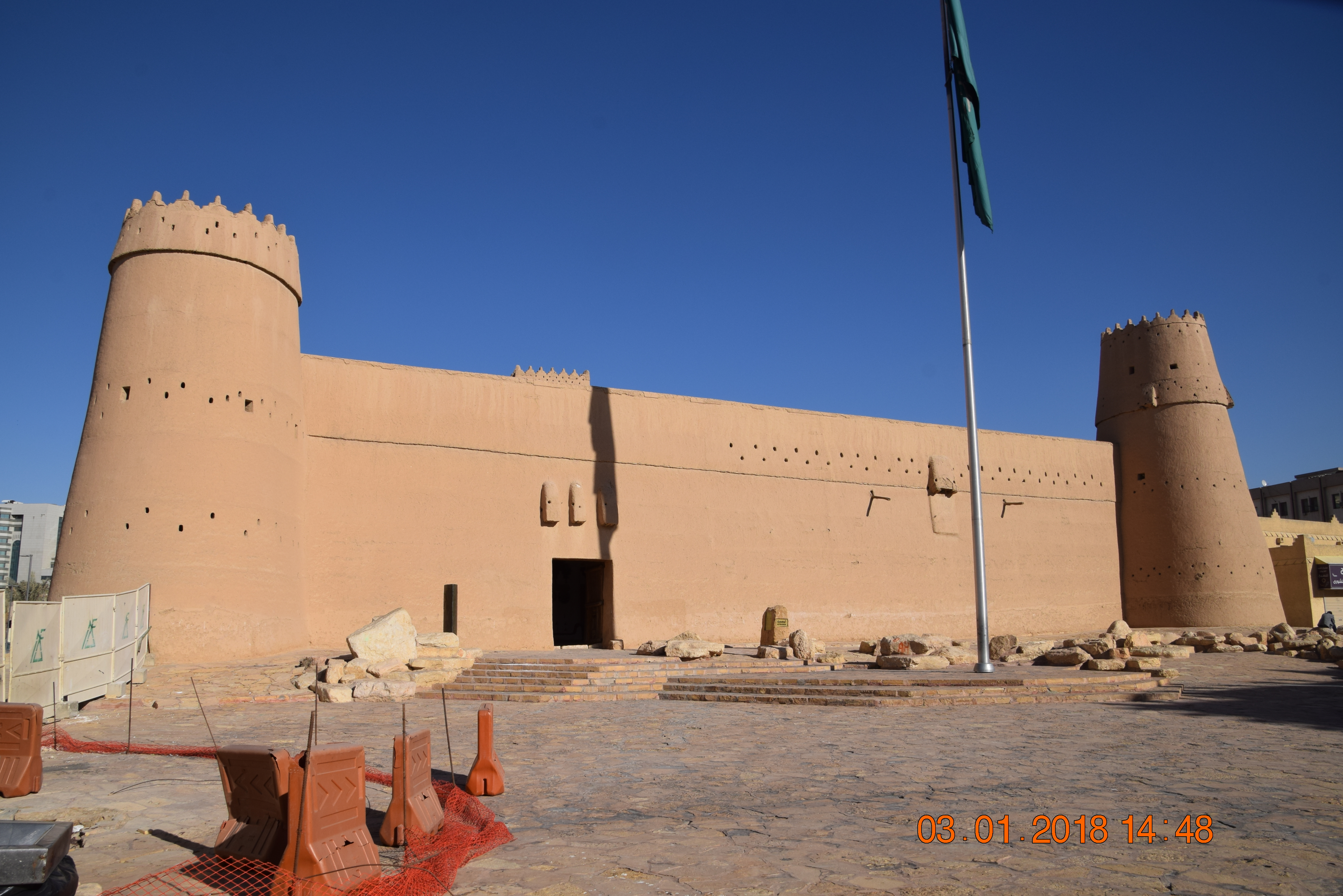
Masmak Fortress in Riyadh, 2018

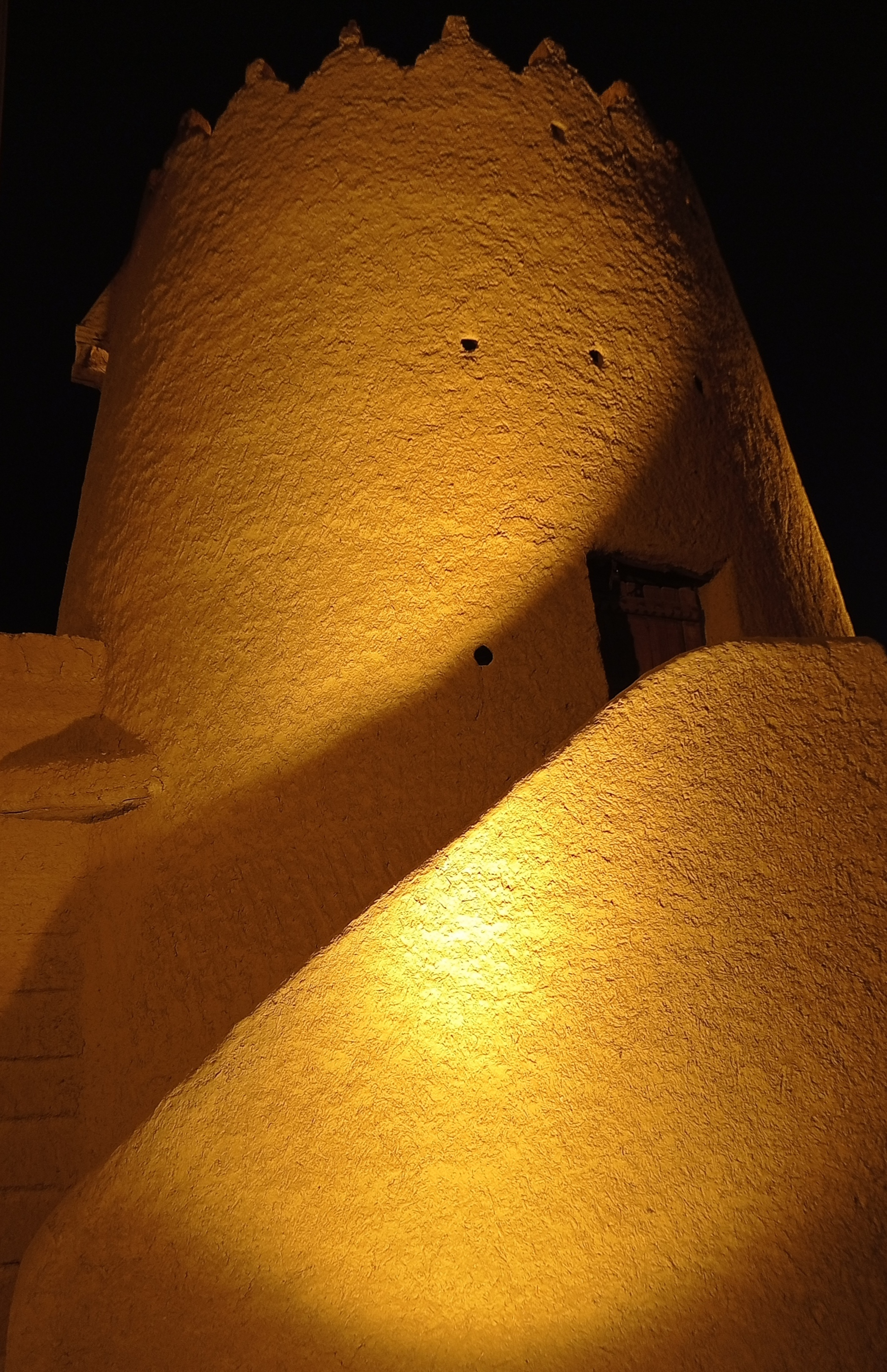
Watchtower of the Thumairi Gate, 2023

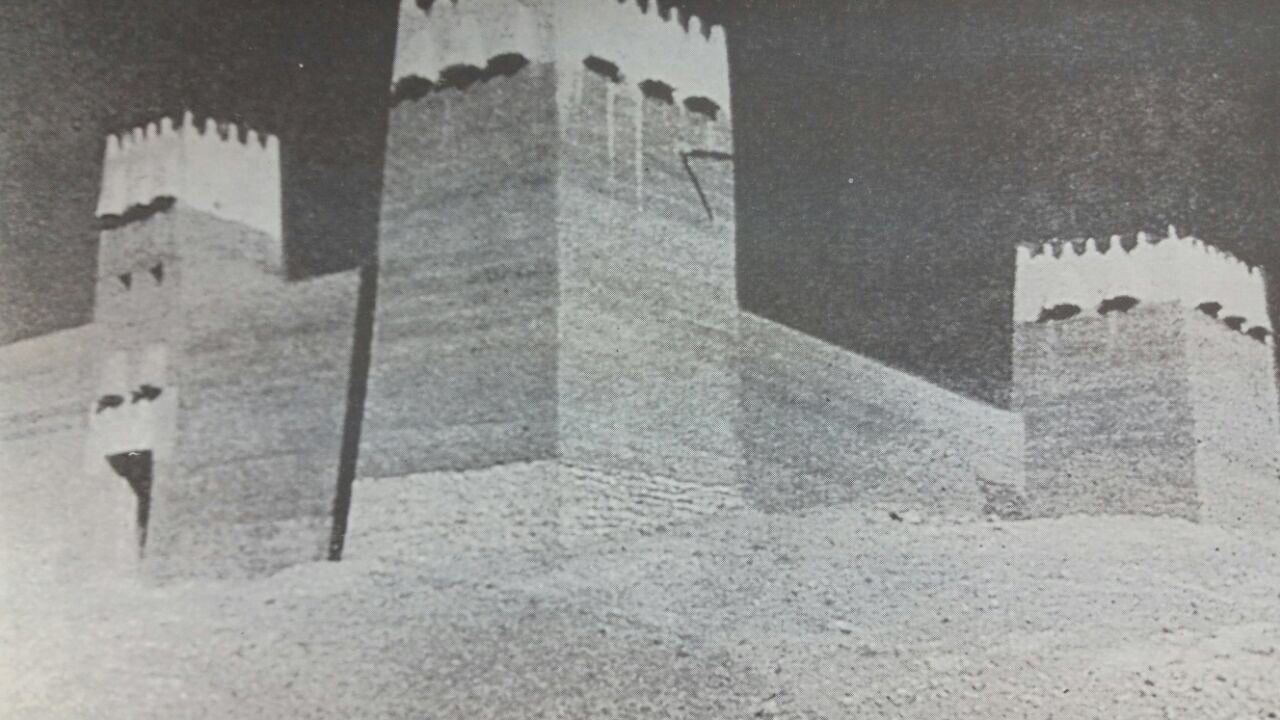
Margab Fort, 1939

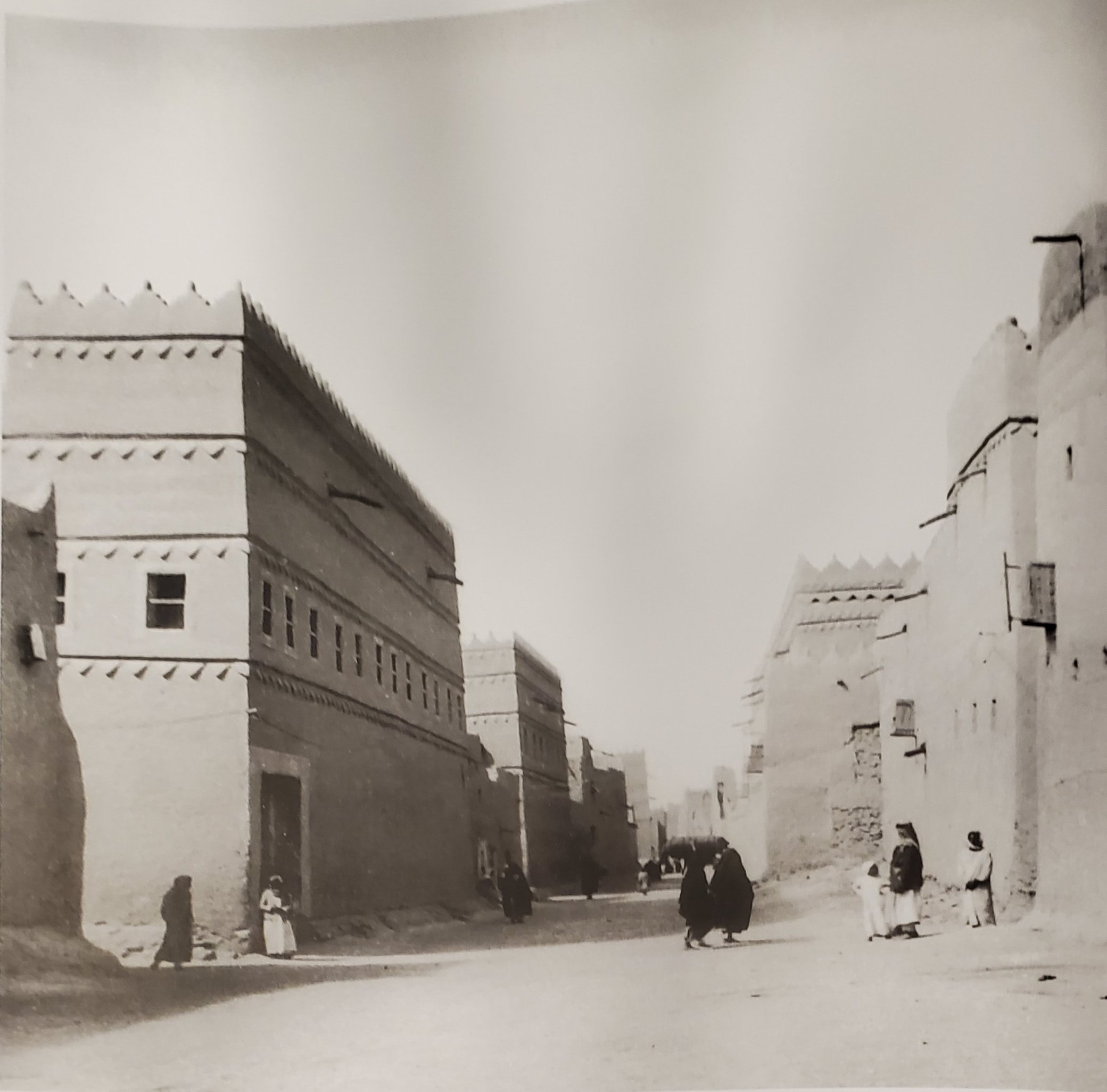
Dwellings of the former walled town of Riyadh, 1938
