= EMD G18 =

American locomotive

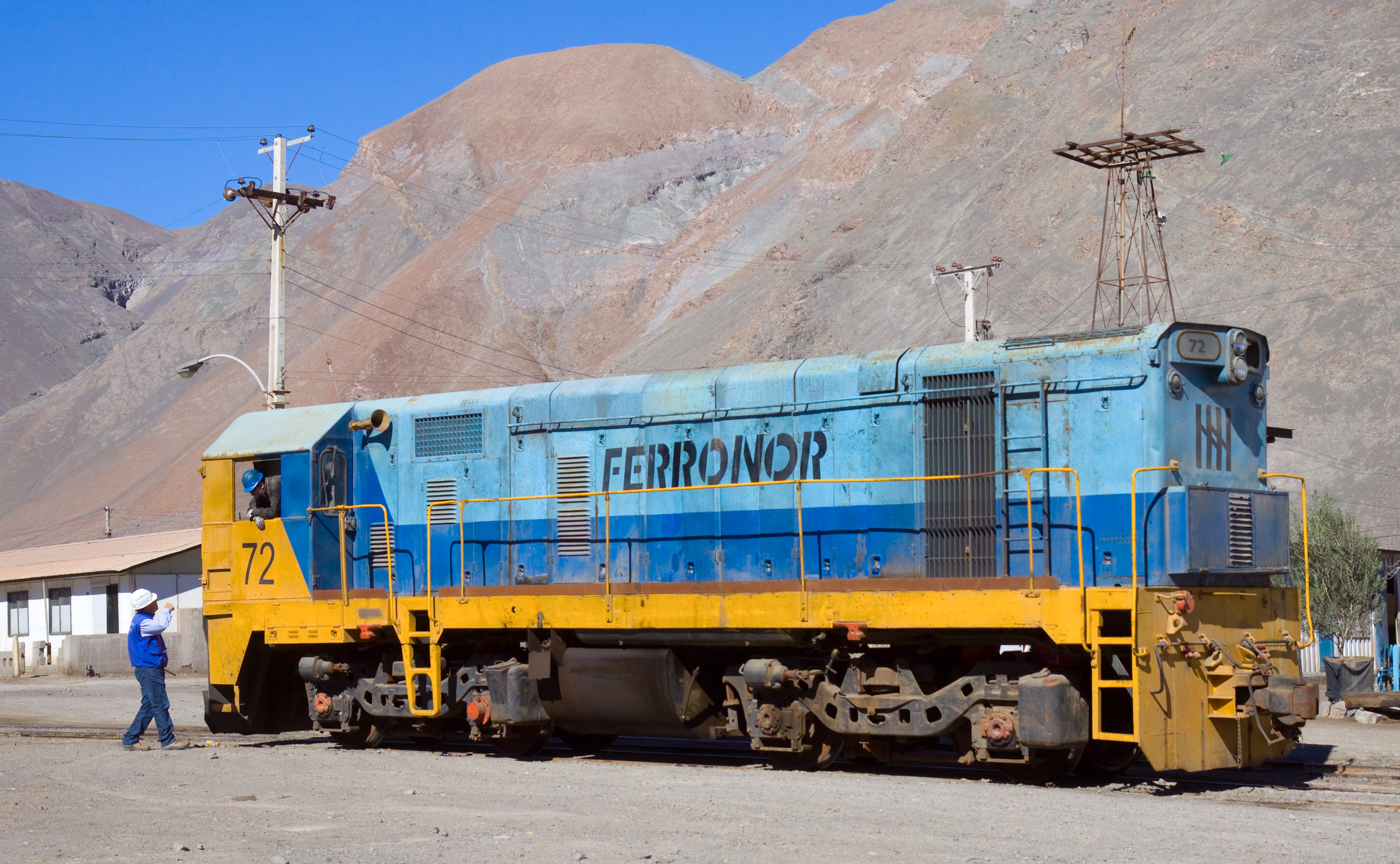
- Ferronor G18U 72 (Former Andes Copper Mining)
Type and origin
- Power type: Diesel–electric
- Builder: GM-EMD La Grange, Illinois, USA, MACOSA, Spain
- Model: G18
- Build date: March 1968-October 1978
- Total produced: 59
Specifications
- Configuration
  - AAR: A1A-A1A or B-B
- Gauge: 1,000 mm (3 ft 3 3/8 in); 3 ft 6 in (1,067 mm); 4 ft 8 1/2 in (1,435 mm)
- Driver dia.: 40 in (1,016 mm)
- Wheelbase: 8 ft 0 in (2.44 m) (Each truck B-B) 10 ft 05 in (3.18 m) (Each truck A1A-A1A)
- Length: 38 ft 0 in (11.58 m)
- Width: 9 ft 8 3/4 in (2.97 m)
- Height: 12 ft 2 11/16 in (3.73 m)
- Loco weight: 124,000 lb (56,250 kg) (62T, G18U6) 134,100 lb (60,830 kg) (67.5T, G18U) 142,900 lb (64,820 kg) (71.45T, G18W)
- Fuel capacity: 500 US gal (1,900 L; 420 imp gal)
- Lubricant cap.: 130 US gal (490 L; 110 imp gal)
- Water cap.: 126 US gal (480 L; 105 imp gal)
- Sandbox cap.: 9 cu ft (0.25 m^{3})
- Prime mover: GM 8-645E
- Engine type: V8 2-stroke diesel
- Aspiration: Roots blower
- Generator: GM D25
- Traction motors: GM D29 (4)
- Cylinders: 8
- Loco brake: Straight air
- Train brakes: Air or Vacuum schedule 26-LA
Performance figures
- Power output: 1,000 hp (750 kW)
Career
- Locale: South America, Middle East, Africa, Asia
- Disposition: Some scrapped, many still operating

The EMD G18 is an export locomotive introduced by GM-EMD in the late 1960s. The standard EMD suffixes applied after the G18 designation to indicate if the customer purchased locomotives with specific traction motors to fit narrow gauge (U) or broad gauge (W) rails. An L indicates a locomotive built with a lightweight frame, and 6 indicates A1A-A1A trucks. The similar EMD GA18 is a G18 designed as an extremely light locomotive with low axle loading and used freight car trucks driven by a cardan shaft and underframe mounted traction motors like its predecessor, the EMD GA8. A further variation is the G18B. They are powered by an EMD 8-645E prime mover rated at 1100 bhp and 1000 hp for traction and were produced with A1A-A1A or B-B trucks.

Several countries have purchased these locomotives.

== A1A-A1A Version Original Owners ==
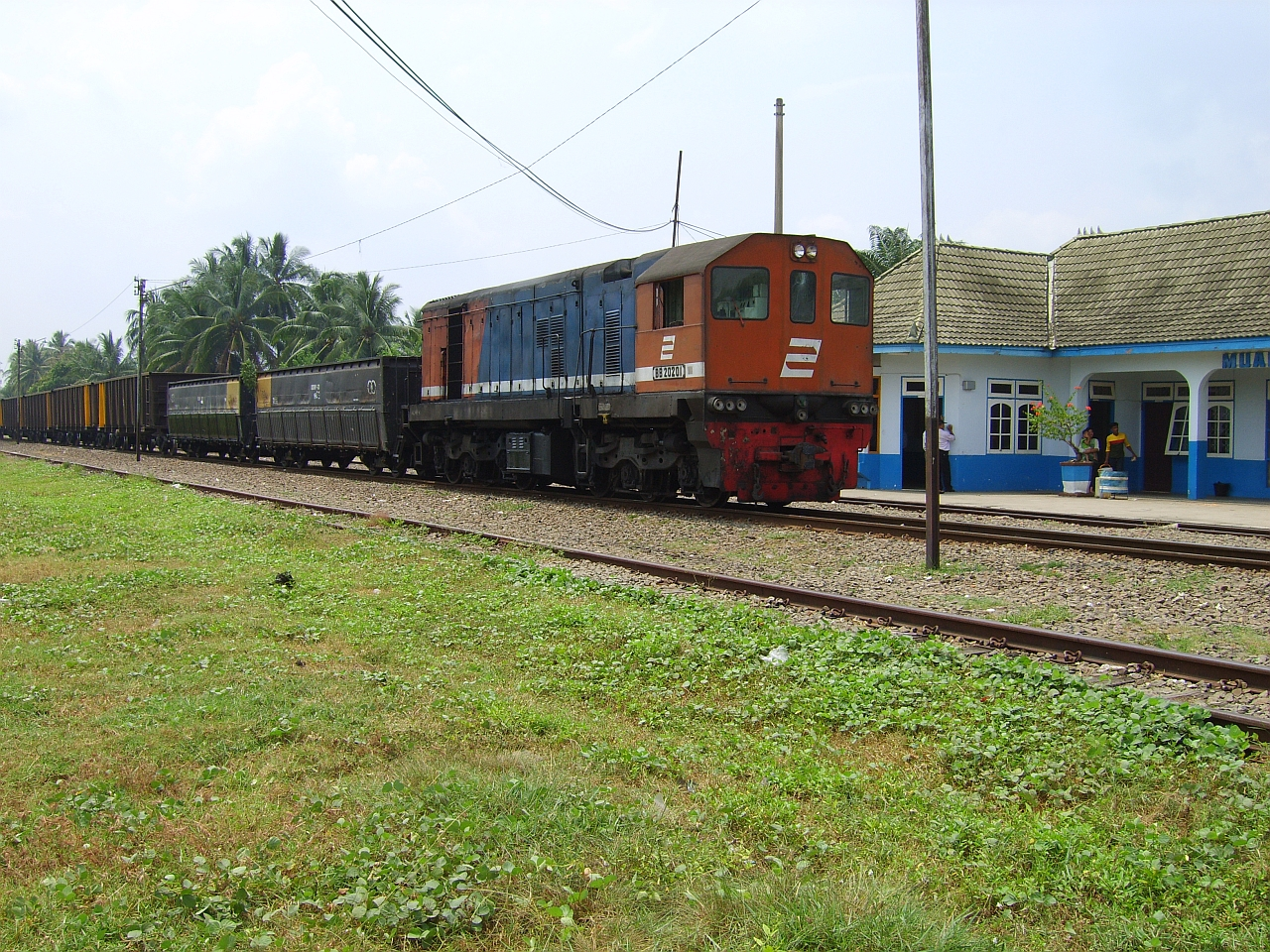
PT Kereta Api Indonesia GL18U6 BB202 01 pulling a freight train

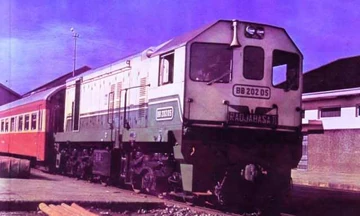
PT Kereta Api Indonesia GL18U6 BB202 01 pulling Radjabasa Train at Tanjung Karang Station, Bandar Lampung c. 1971

=== Chile ===
- 1 FCAB 954

=== Indonesia ===
- 8 Indonesian Railways BB202 01-BB202 08 (Note: BB202 01 - BB202 03 are GL18U6)

== B-B Version Original Owners ==
=== Chile ===
- 2 Andes Copper Mining 71-72

=== Iran ===
- 2 Rah E Ahan 40451-40452

=== Israel ===
- 1 Rotem Amfert Negev Ltd company in Mishore Rotem (former company name: Negev Phosphates Ltd)

=== Peru ===
- 1 Cerro de Pasco 24

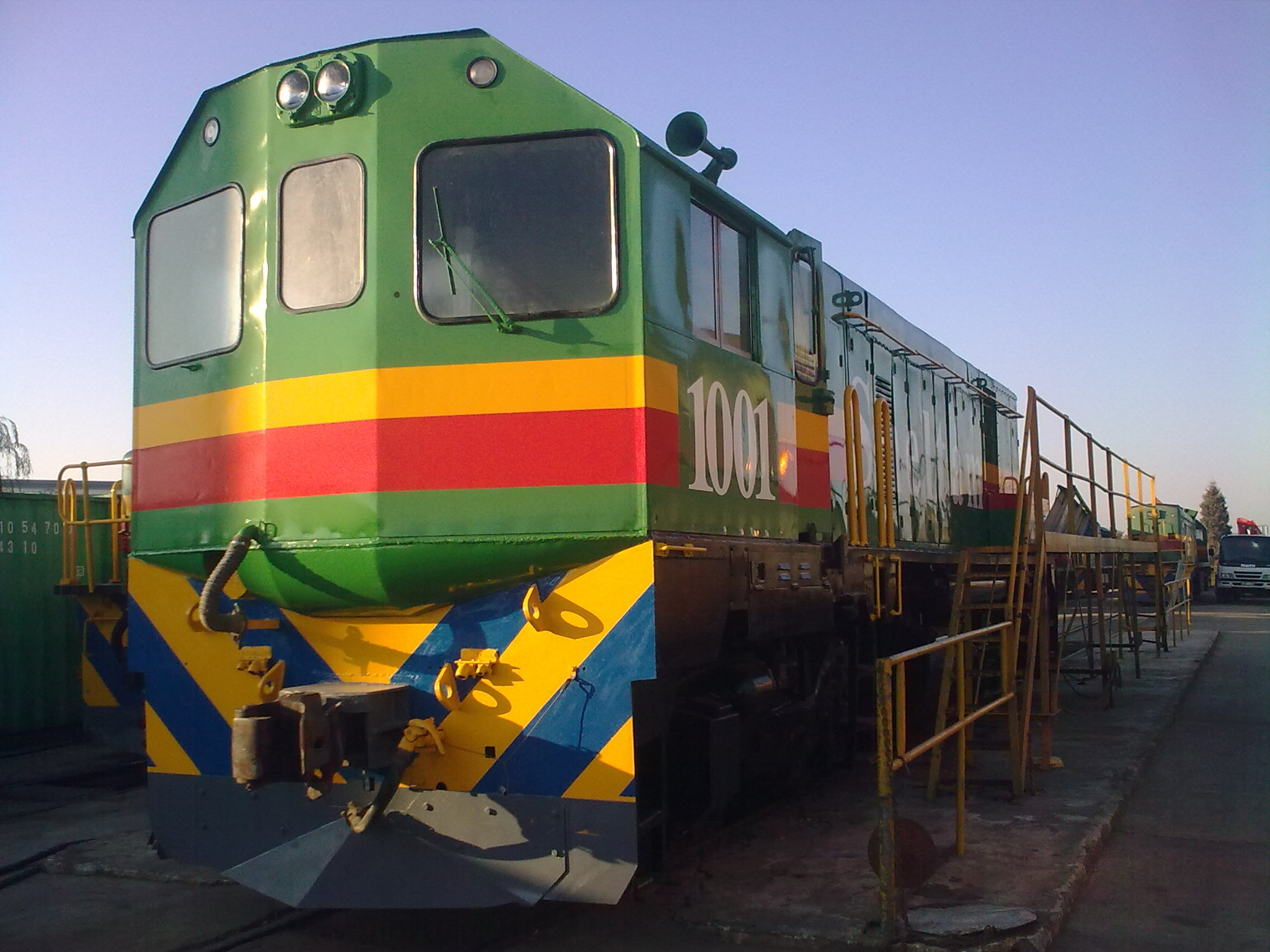
Sheltam G18U 1001 (Former Anglo American Corp.)

=== Saudi Arabia ===
- 16 G18W locomotives were built for the Saudi Government Railways Organization (later the Saudi Railways Organization) in three separate batches, starting in 1968 with five locomotives, numbered 1006-1010. Five more were built in 1974, numbered 1011-1015, and the last six (nos. 1016-1021) were built in 1976. The locomotives had a power output of 1100 horsepower.

=== South Africa ===
- 19 Anglo American Corp. (1 unit no #); 1–3; 21–25; Iron & Steel Corp. 36–42; 661.42-661.44

=== Spain ===
- 4 Minero Siderúrgica de Ponferrada 1001-1004

== G18B/M Original Owners ==
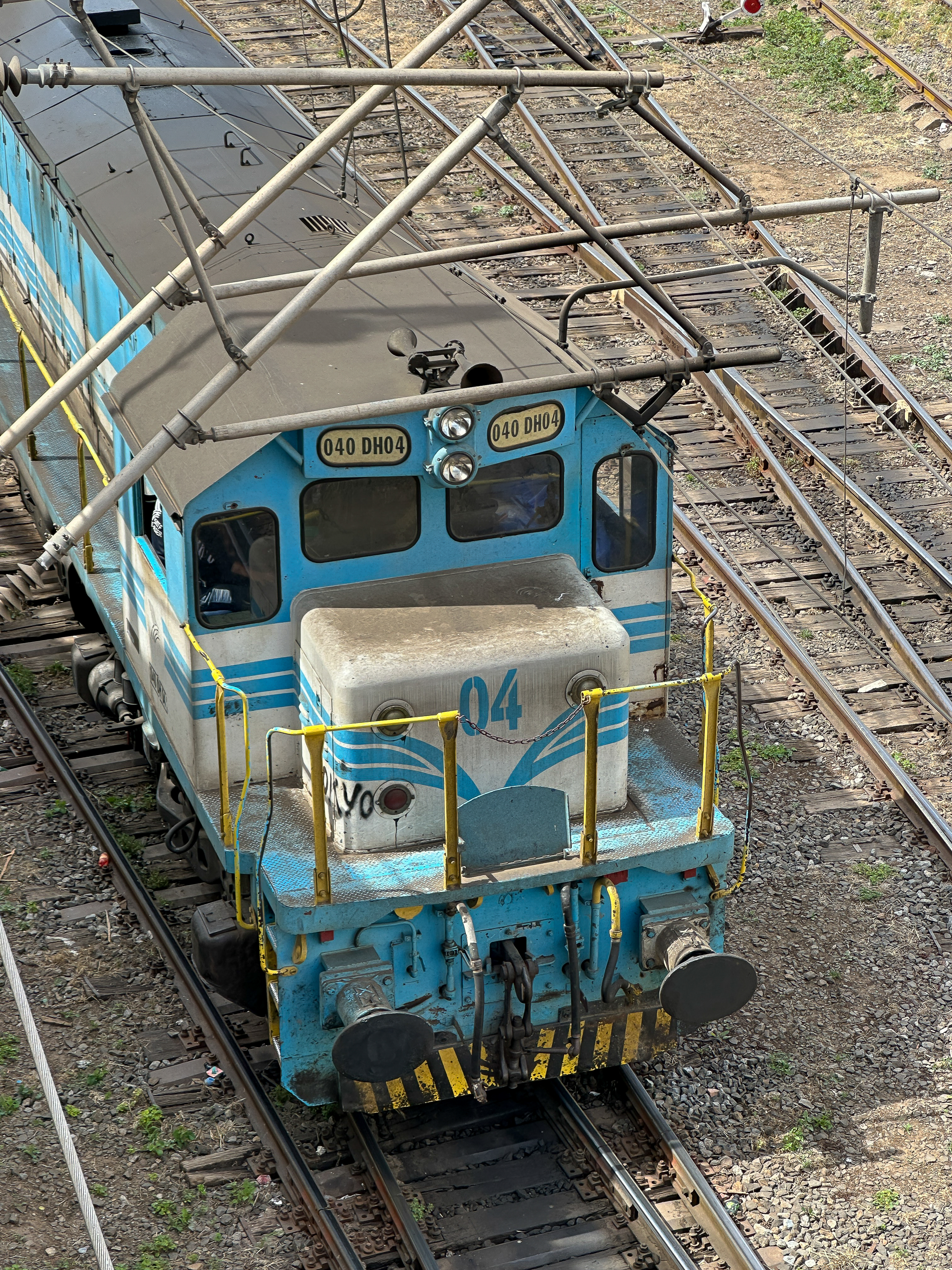
A GL18B locomotive (SNTF class 040-DH) in Algeria in May 2025.

=== Algeria ===
The G18B and G18M found most of their success in Algeria, where they were purchased as light freight and shunting locomotives.

The first purchase by the SNTF, Algeria's national railway company, of G18 locomotives was for 30 GL18M locomotives split into two classes: the 040-WDK class, which consisted of five units with an AAR configuration of C-C, and the 040-YDR (later reclassed YDA) class, which consisted of twenty-five units with an AAR configuration of A1A-A1A. These locomotives were all built between July and September 1977. The 040-YDA class is notable because it was built to run on 1055 mm (Algerian gauge) rails. As of late 2025, several locomotives of the 040-YDA class remain in operation on the last remaining 1055 mm gauge line in Algeria. Several 040-YDA locomotives have also been converted to standard gauge and reclassed as the 040-WDA class.

The second order was placed in 1990 for five standard-gauge GL18B locomotives. These locomotives, classed as the 040-DH, were built largely to the same specifications as the previous order. The five locomotives were built from March to May 1990. Eight more locomotives were built in late 1993, bringing the total number of 040-DH class locomotives to 13. A third order of GL18B locomotives, known as the 040-DJ class, was later also placed. A total of fifteen 040-DJ locomotives were built between September and December 2000, featuring an updated design over the previous 040-DH class.
