= EMD GA18 =

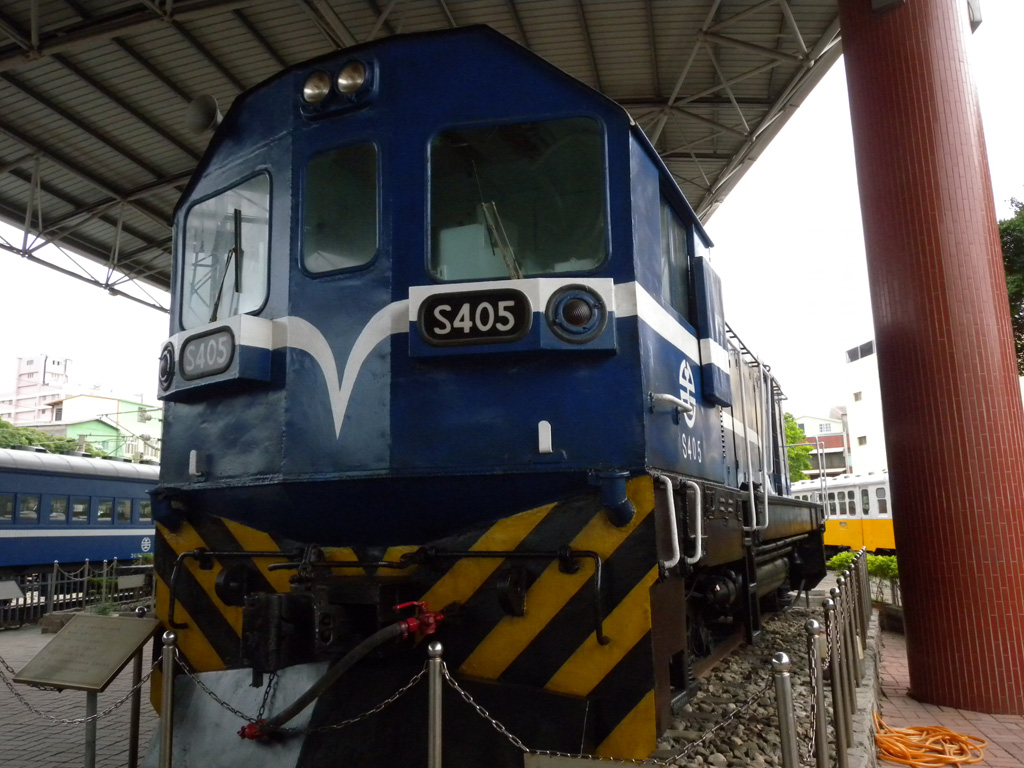
- Taiwan Railway Administration S405 on display at Miaoli Railway Museum
Type and origin
- Power type: Diesel-electric
- Builder: GM-EMD La Grange, Illinois, USA
- Model: GA18
- Build date: February–November 1969
- Total produced: 7
Specifications
- Configuration
  - AAR: B-B
- Gauge: 1,000 mm (3 ft 3 3/8 in); 3 ft 6 in (1,067 mm)
- Driver dia.: 32 in (813 mm)
- Wheelbase: 5 ft 8 in (1.73 m) (Each truck)
- Length: 38 ft 0 in (11.58 m)
- Width: 9 ft 8 3/4 in (2.97 m)
- Height: 12 ft 2 11/16 in (3.73 m)
- Axle load: 13.5T
- Loco weight: 108,000 lb (48,990 kg) (54T)
- Prime mover: GM 8-645E
- Engine type: V8 2-stroke diesel
- Aspiration: Roots blower
- Traction motors: Two D75MC DC
- Cylinders: 8
- Loco brake: Straight air
- Train brakes: Air(Taiwan, Chile), Vacuum (Zambia) schedule 26-LA
Performance figures
- Maximum speed: 45 mph (72 km/h)
- Power output: 1,000 hp (750 kW)
Career
- Locale: Taiwan (5), Chile (1), Zambia (1)
- Disposition: Most scrapped, with the only known preserved example being S405, owned by Taiwan Railway Administration

The EMD GA18 was an export locomotive built by GM-EMD in 1969. The GA18 was a derivative of the EMD G18 and was designed as an extremely light locomotive with low axle loading which used freight car trucks driven by cardan shafts and two traction motors attached to the underframe. It was the successor model of the EMD GA8. They were powered by an EMD 8-645E prime mover rated at 1100 bhp and 1000 hp for traction. Only seven units were built.

== Original Owners ==
=== Chile ===
- 1 FCAB 953

=== Taiwan ===
- 5 Taiwan Railway Administration S401-S405

=== Zambia ===
- 1 Nchanga Consol Copper 10

== Taiwan Railway Administration ==
Taiwan Railway Administration purchased five GA18 locomotives in 1969 which were equipped with special cab signal display and track sorting devices for use as Qidu hump yard switching locomotives. They were named the S400 series by the TRA. In addition to yard switching, the TRA S400 series GA18's were also used to pull short run commuter trains. After the closing of Qidu hump yard, the S400 series were used as general road switchers until their retirement. All have been scrapped with the exception of S405 which has been preserved and restored in its original blue paint scheme, and S402 which is currently stored in a half-dismantled state, Currently awaiting scrapping as it's nearly impossible to restore. Both locomotives are located in Taipei Railway Workshop

== Gallery ==
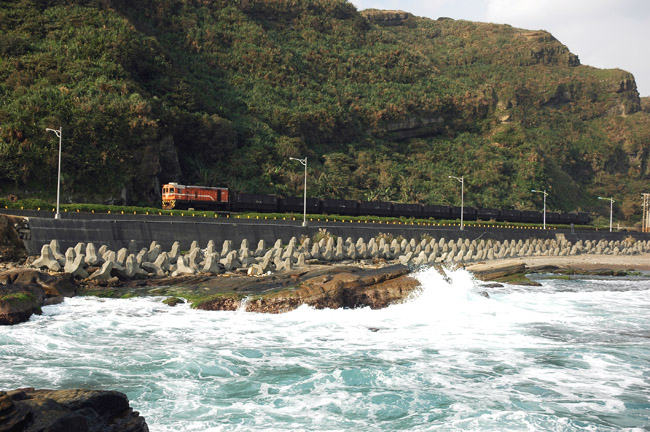
TRA S400 series GA18 pulling a coal train

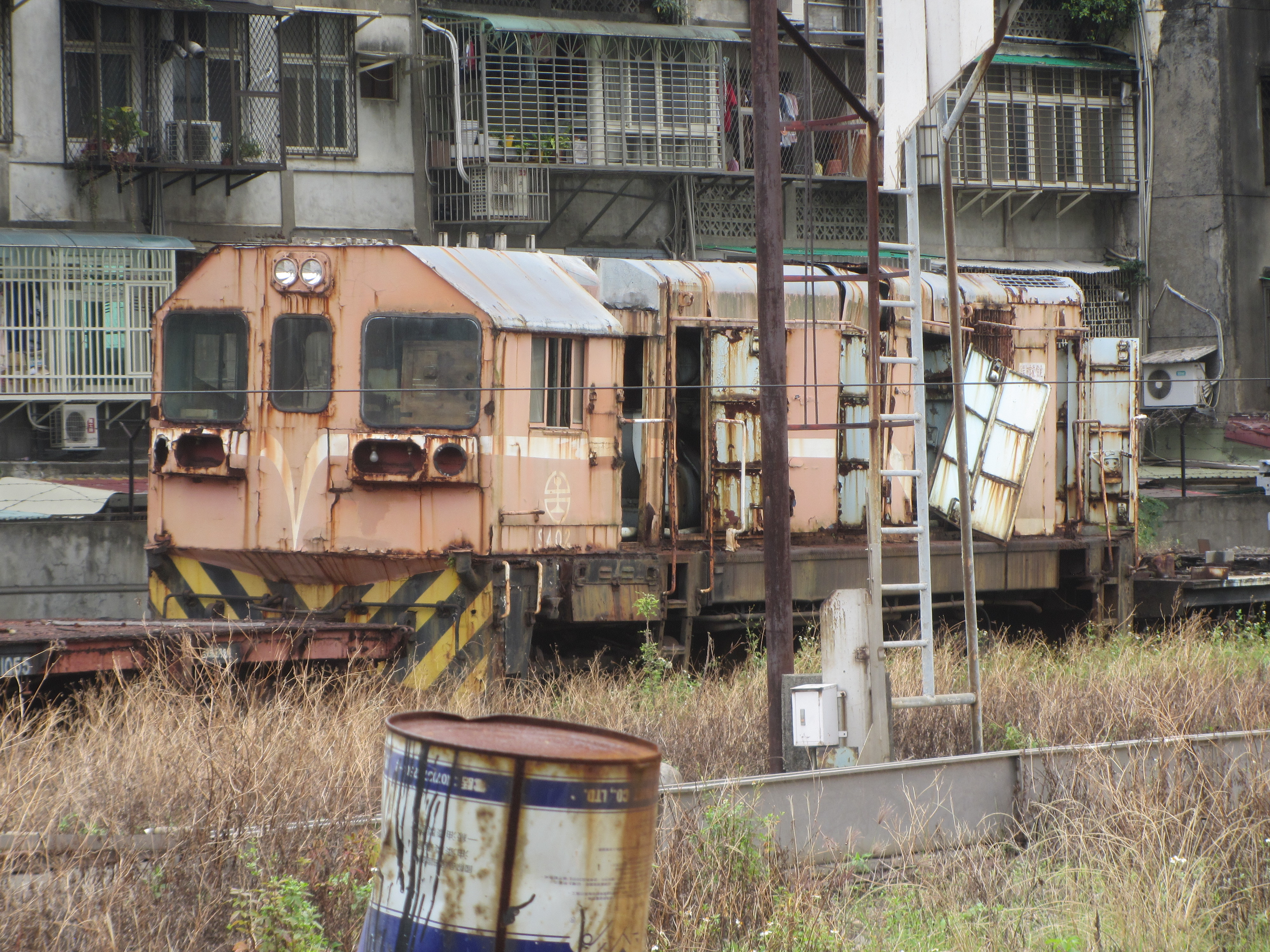
Disused TRA S402 at Taipei Railway Workshop

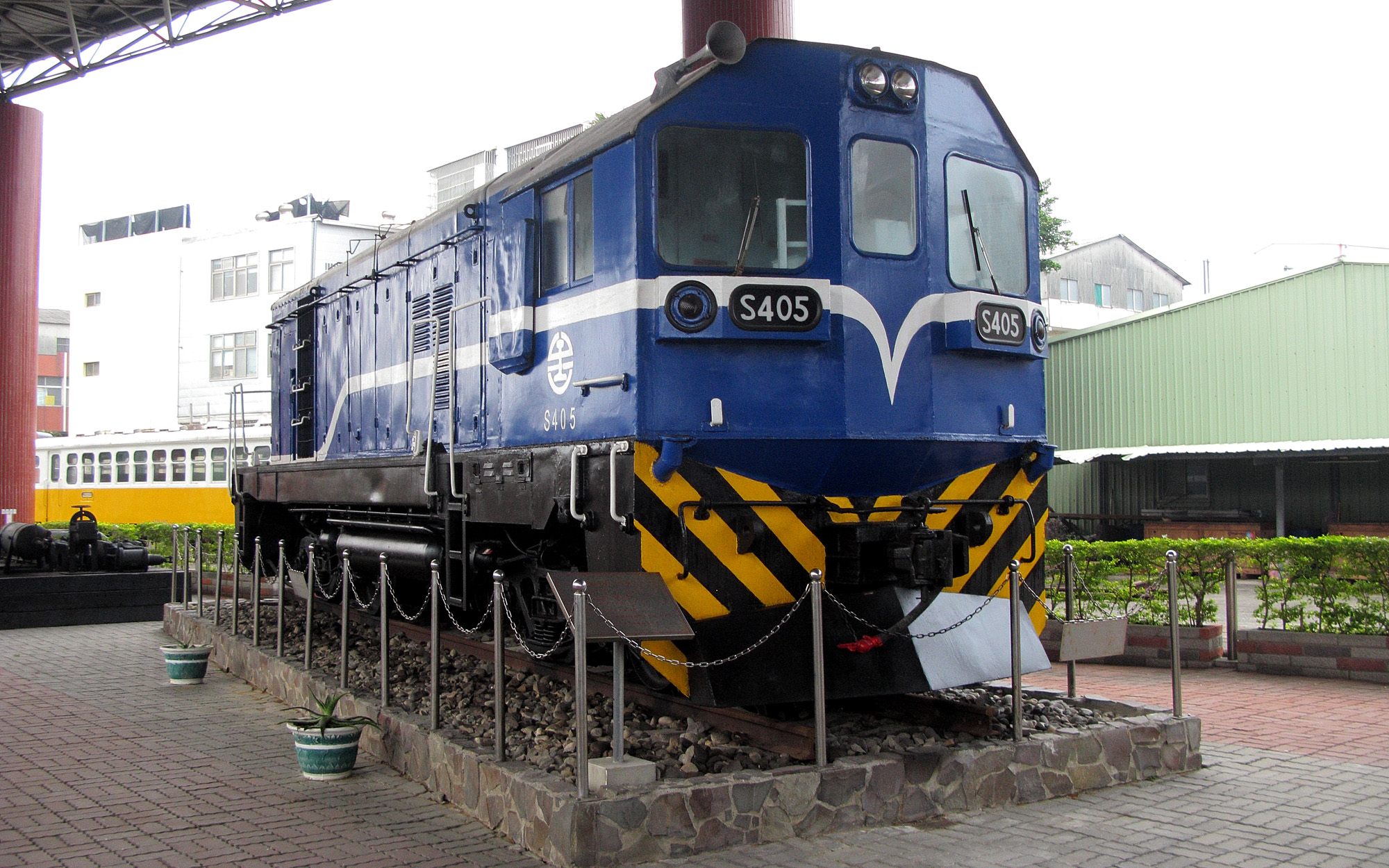
Taiwan Railway Administration S405 on display at Miaoli Railway Museum (Currently moved to Taipei Railway Workshop)

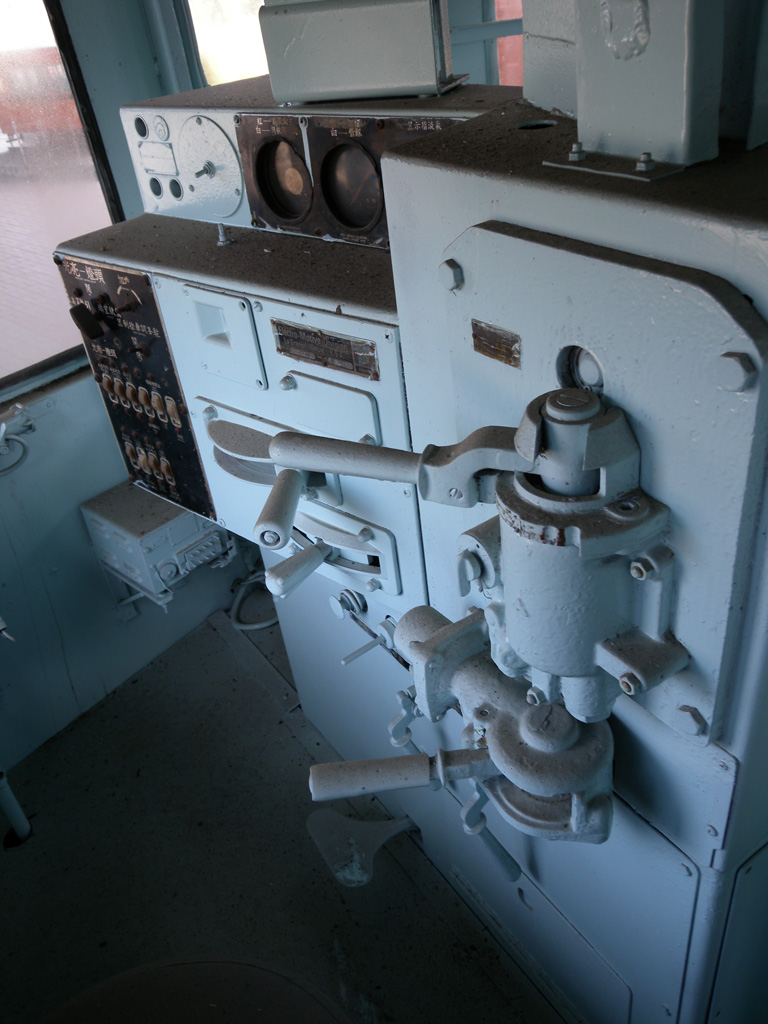
TRA S405 control stand

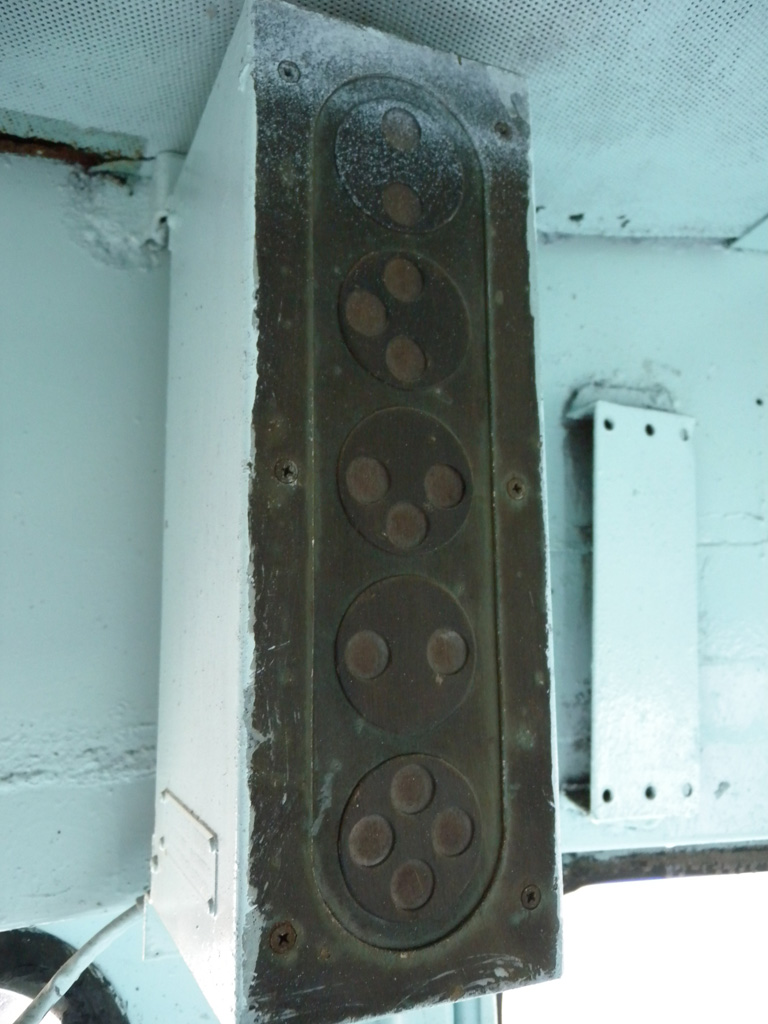
TRA S405 cab signal display for hump yard operation
