= Paramount Cars =

Paramount Ten Paramount 1½-Litre
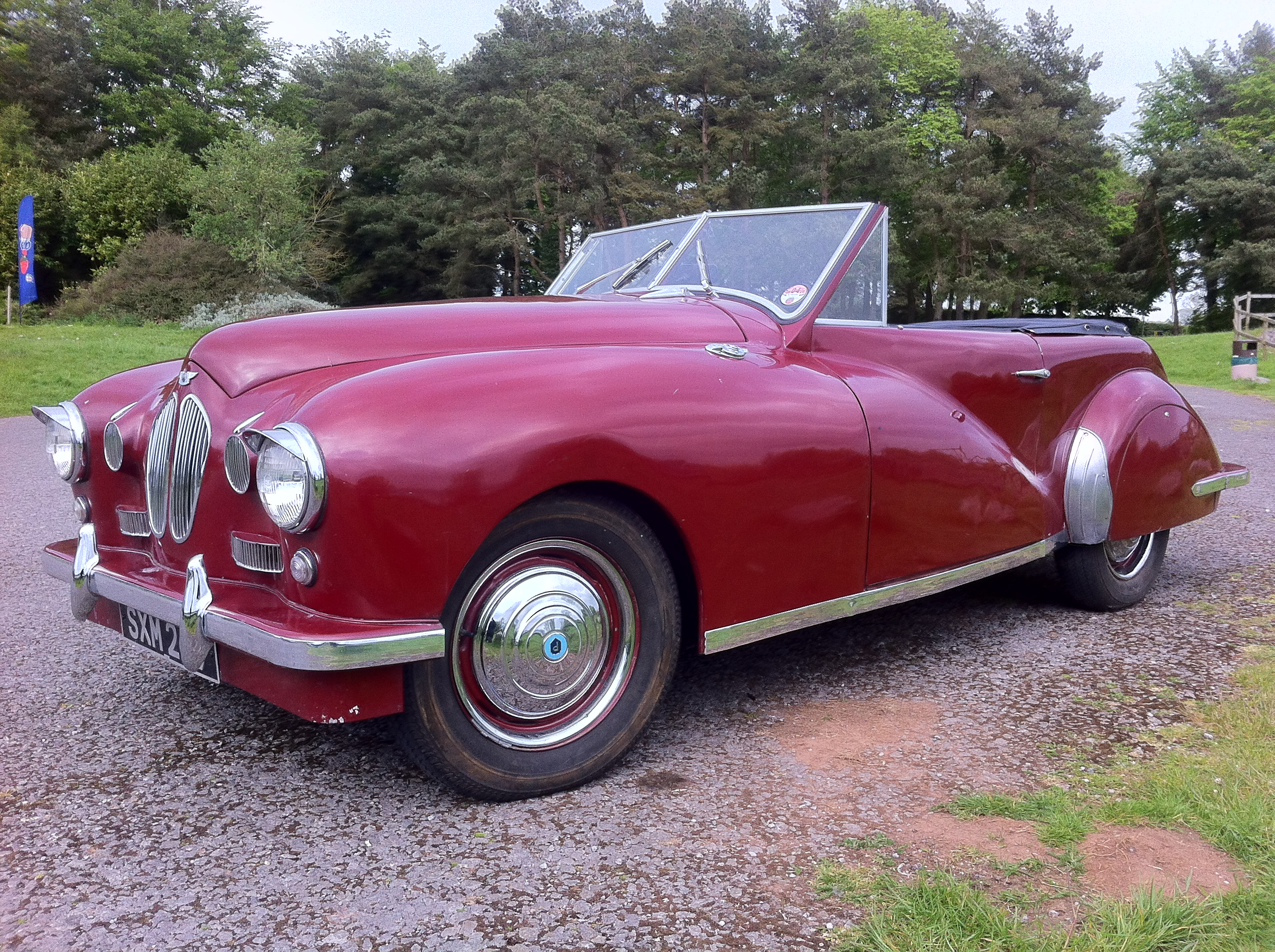

Overview
- Manufacturer: Paramount Cars Ltd
- Production: 1950-1956 production - 72 approx.

Body and chassis
- Body style: 2 door roadster 2 door saloon

Powertrain
- Engine: 1172 cc Straight-4; 1508 cc Straight-4
- Transmission: Three speed manual

Dimensions
- Wheelbase: 96 in (2,438 mm) later 102 in (2,591 mm)
- Length: 166 in (4,216 mm)
- Width: 66 in (1,676 mm)
- Curb weight: 2,040 lb (930 kg) to 2,350 lb (1,070 kg).

Paramount Cars was a British company which produced the Paramount automobile between 1950 and 1956. Founded by WA Hudson and S Underwood from Derbyshire, the company initially manufactured cars in Swadlincote with production moving shortly after to Melbourne (again in Derbyshire) and then to Leighton Buzzard. Two models were produced, the Paramount Ten and the Paramount 1½-Litre.

== History ==
The Paramount had an aluminium over wood frame body with BMW like grille and was mounted on a separate tubular steel chassis with front transverse and rear semi elliptical leaf springs. It was originally intended to have Alvis engine and suspension but to reduce cost the production versions used Ford 10 components including the 1172 cc side valve engines, but fitted with twin SU carburettors, which resulted in poor performance. The car was listed in both 2 and 4 seat versions.

In 1953, the company was bought by Camden Motors and production moved to Leighton Buzzard and the Ford Consul 1,508 cc engine was an option in a longer chassis as also was a Wade or Shorrock supercharger. The price was now an uncompetitive £1009 and production ceased in 1956 after about 70 cars had been made.

After the end of car production the remaining chassis were sold off and several were fitted with Rochdale glass fibre bodies.

There was no connection with the two separate American Paramount Car companies of Azusa, California (1923-1924) and New York City (1927-1931).

== Performance ==
A 1500 cc car tested by the British magazine The Motor in 1956 had a top speed of 72.4 mph (116.5 km/h) and could accelerate from 0-60 mph (97 km/h) in 31.2 seconds. A fuel consumption of 25.6 miles per imperial gallon (11.0 L/100 km; 21.3 mpg_{‑US}) was recorded. The test car cost £1013 including taxes.

== Gallery ==
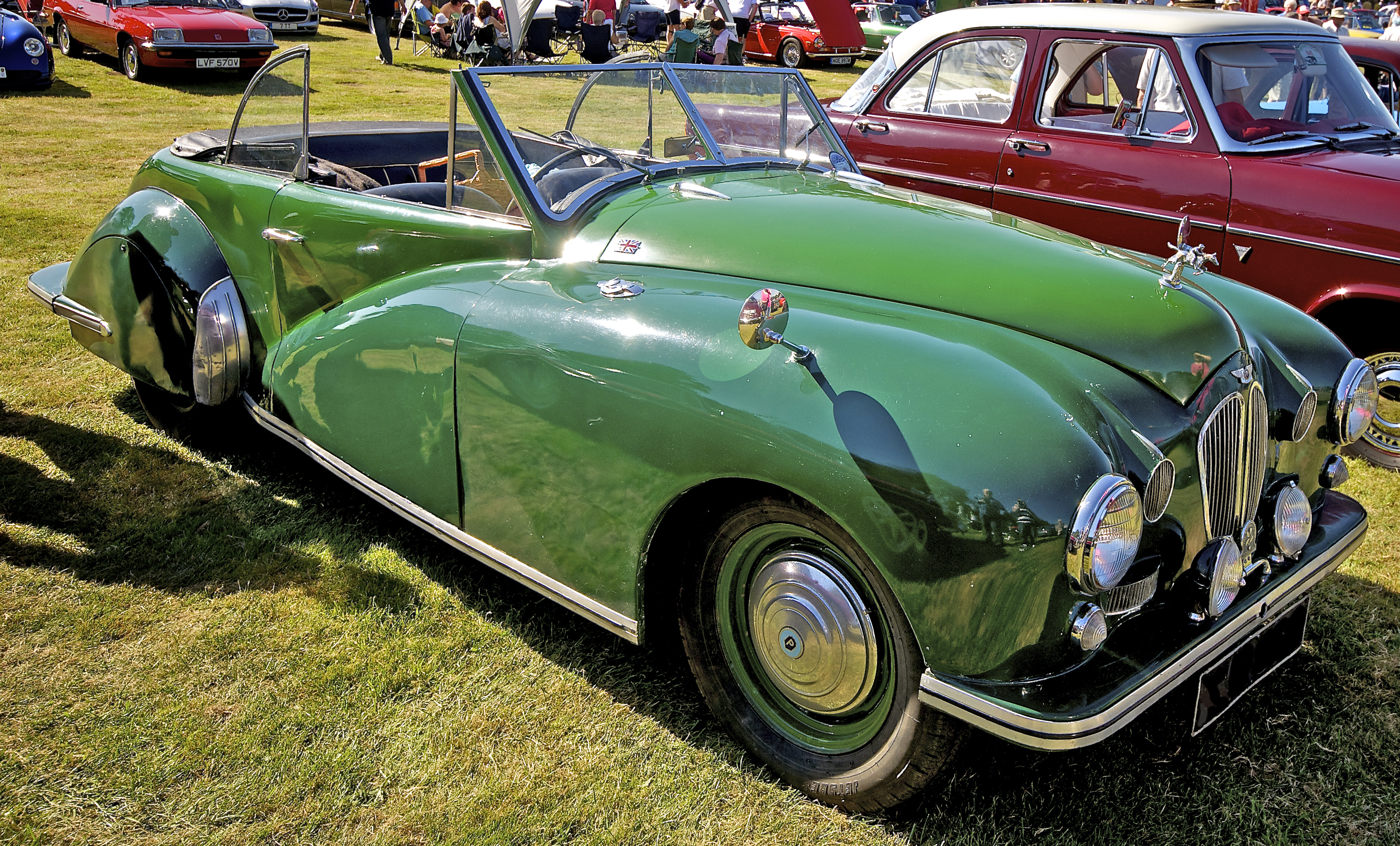
1956 Paramount 1½ Litre with the Ford Consul engine

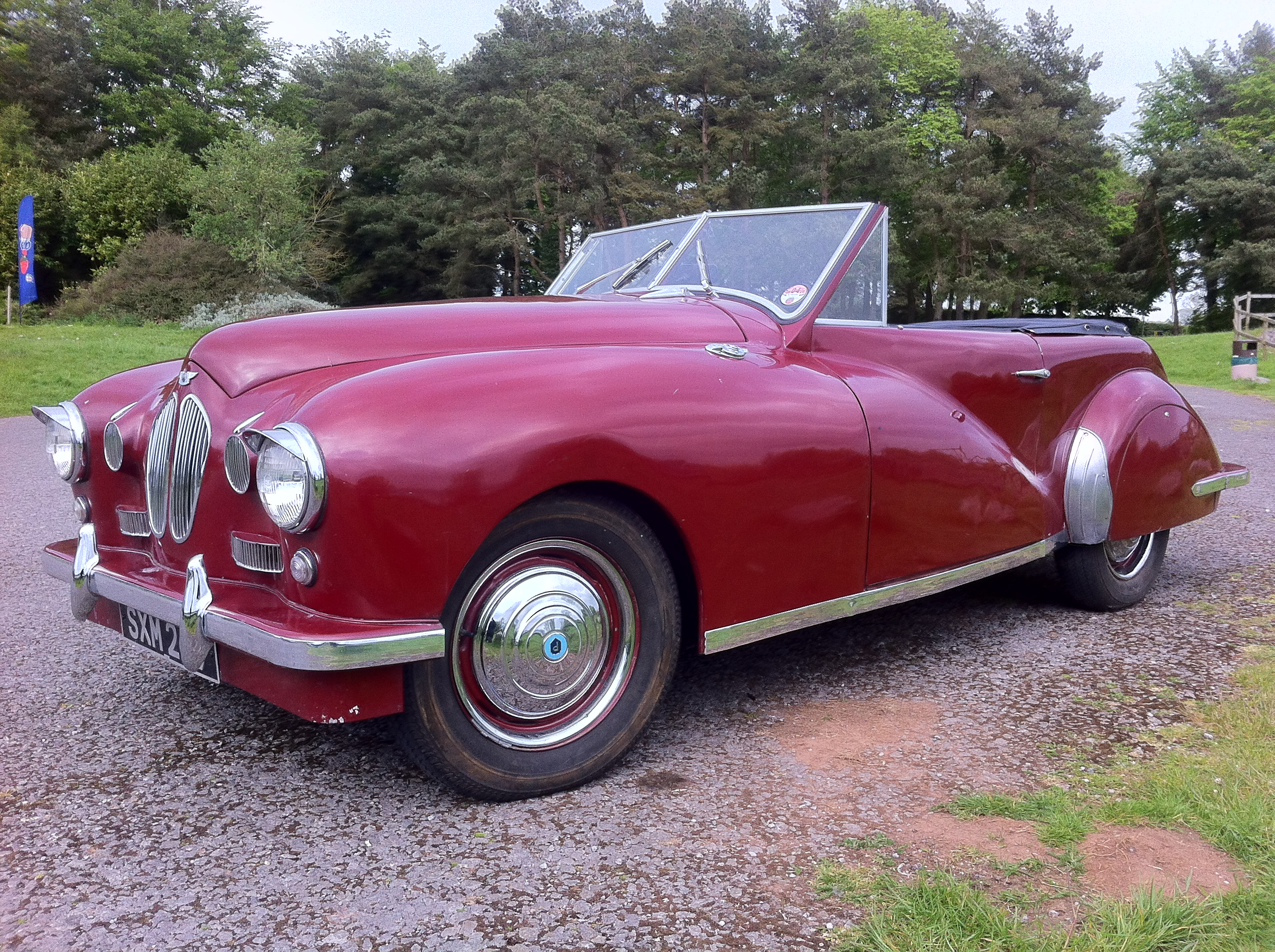
1956 Paramount 1 1/2 litre Roadster

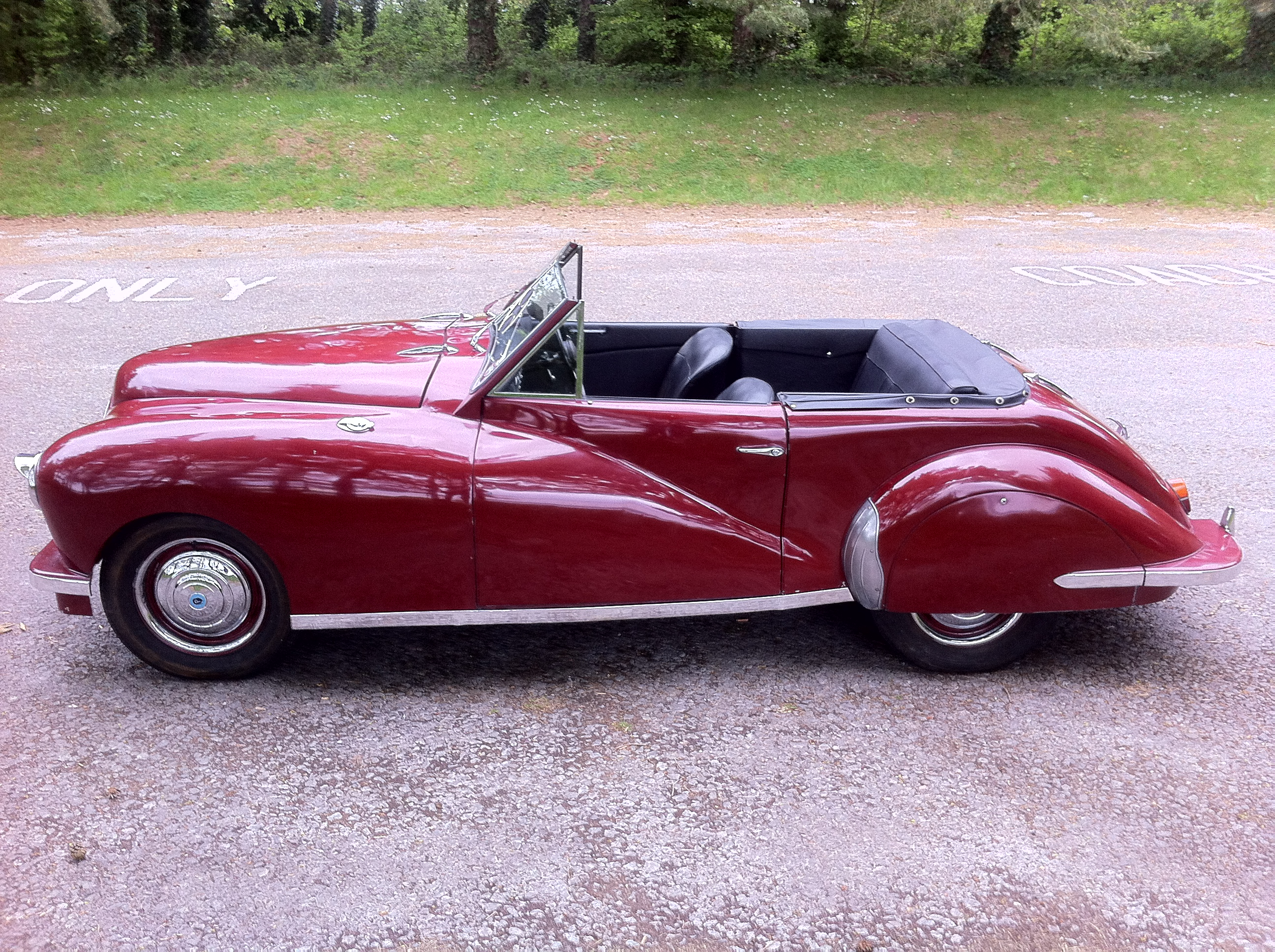
1956 Paramount 1 1/2 litre Roadster

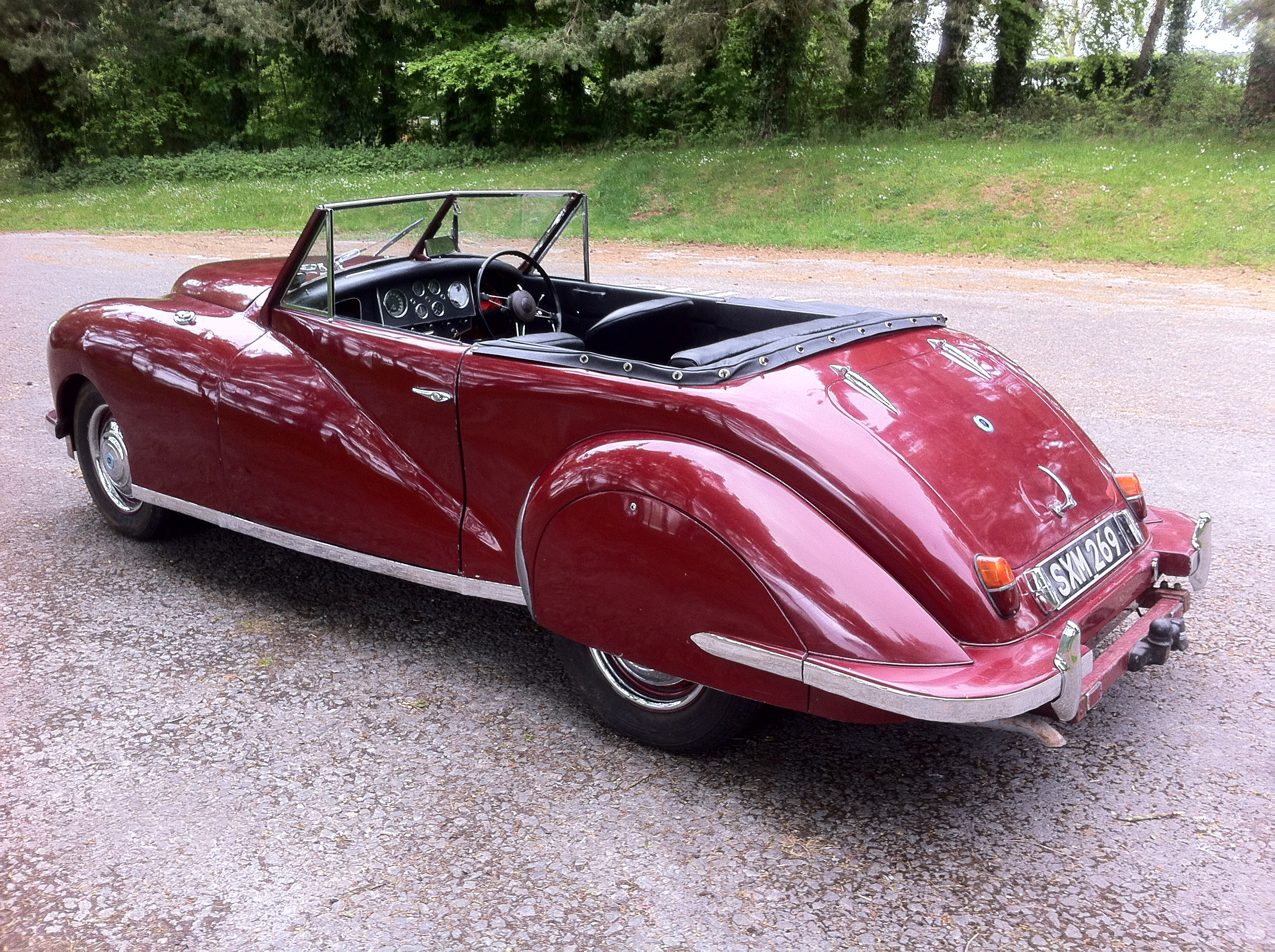
1956 Paramount 1 1/2 litre Roadster

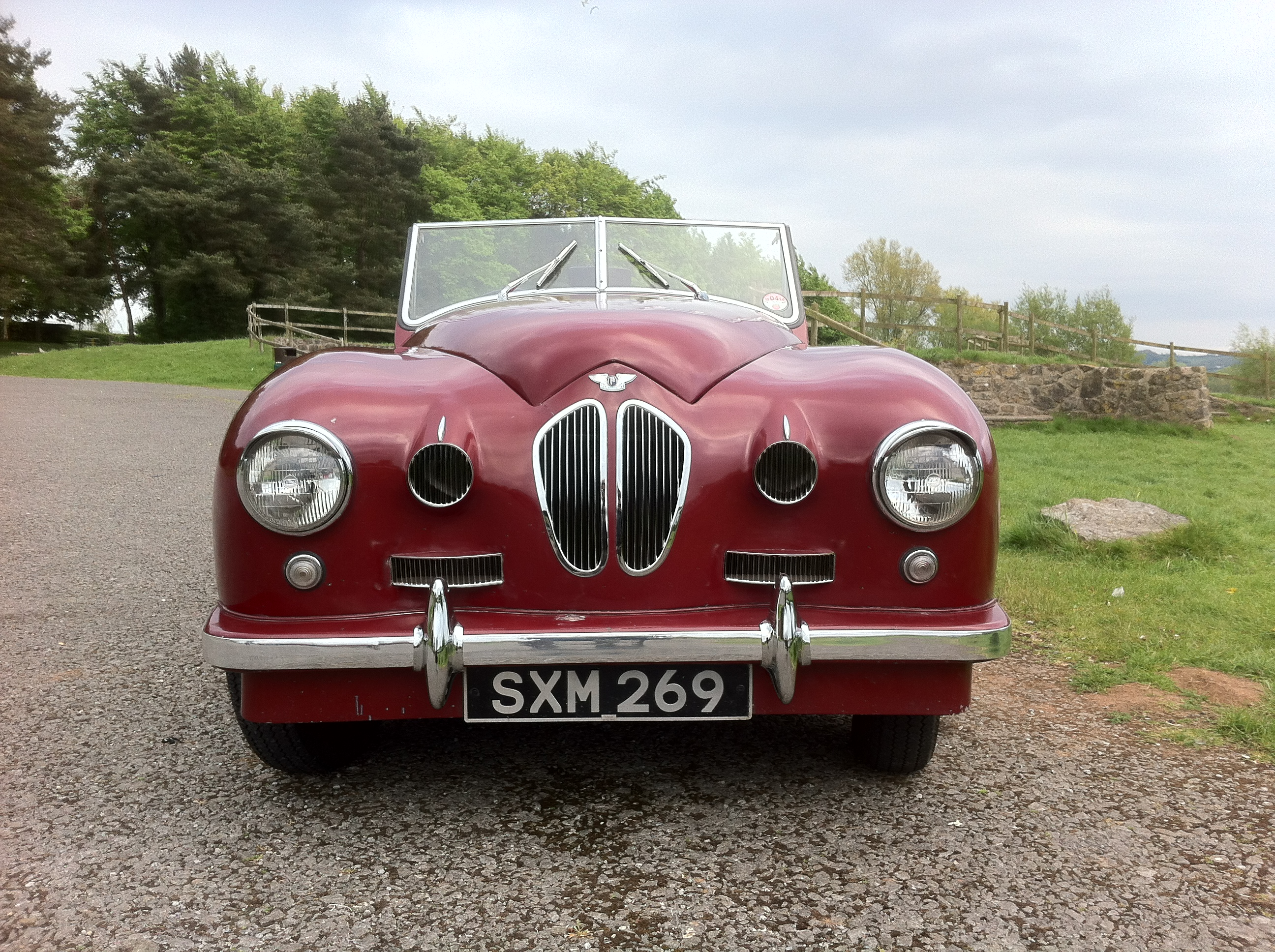
1956 Paramount 1 1/2 litre Roadster

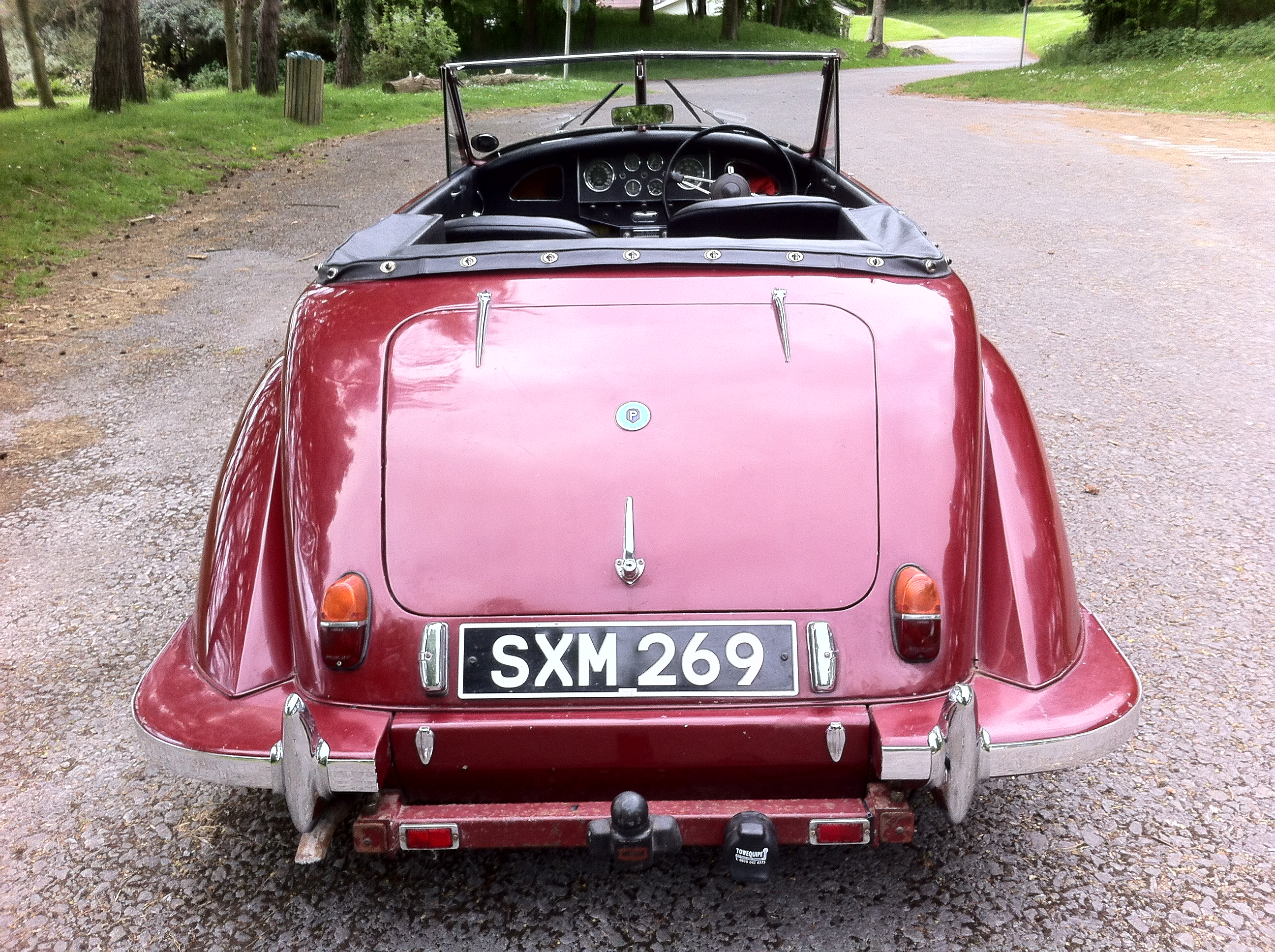
1956 Paramount 1 1/2 litre Roadster

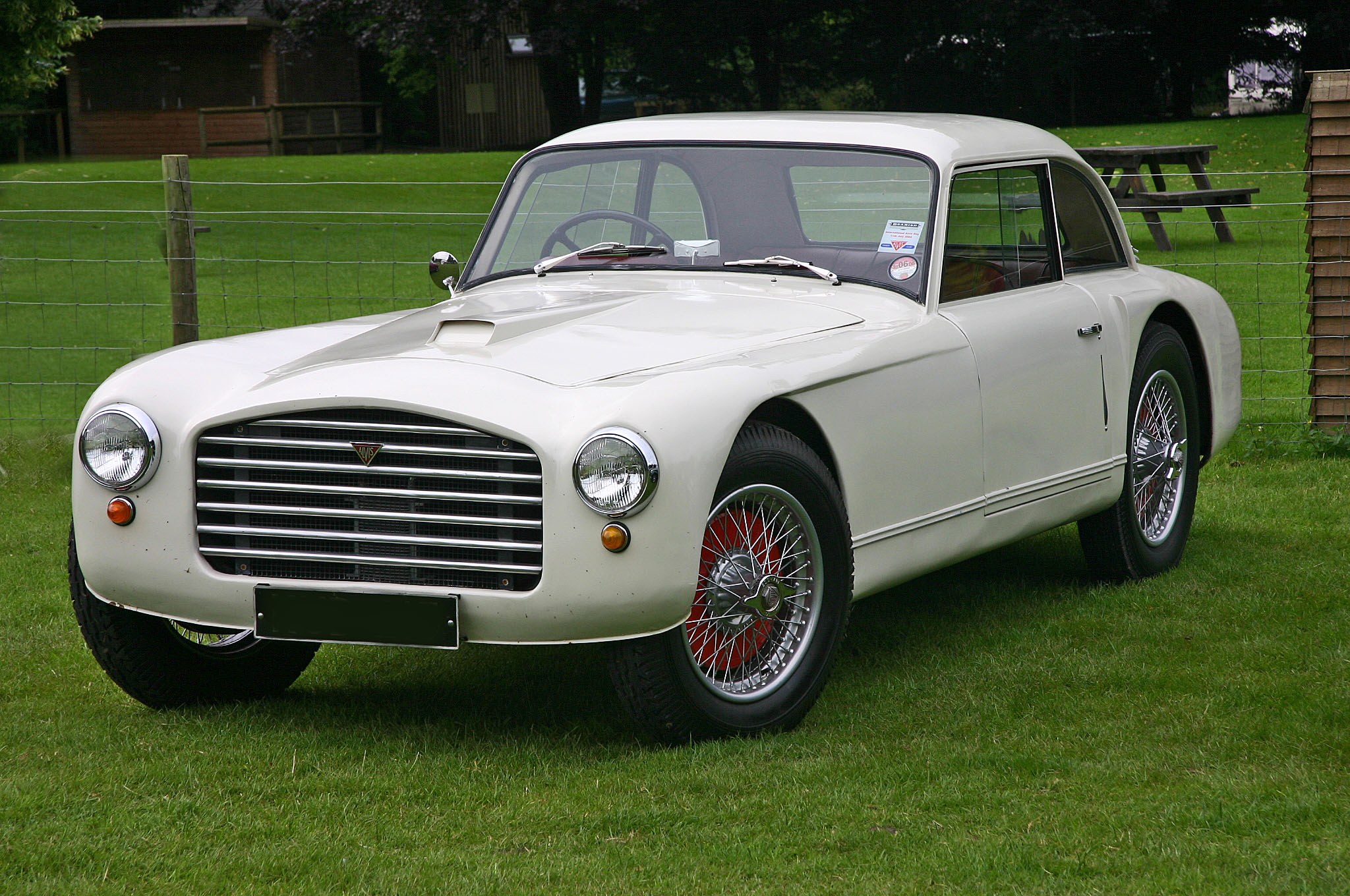
Alvis-based prototype 1948

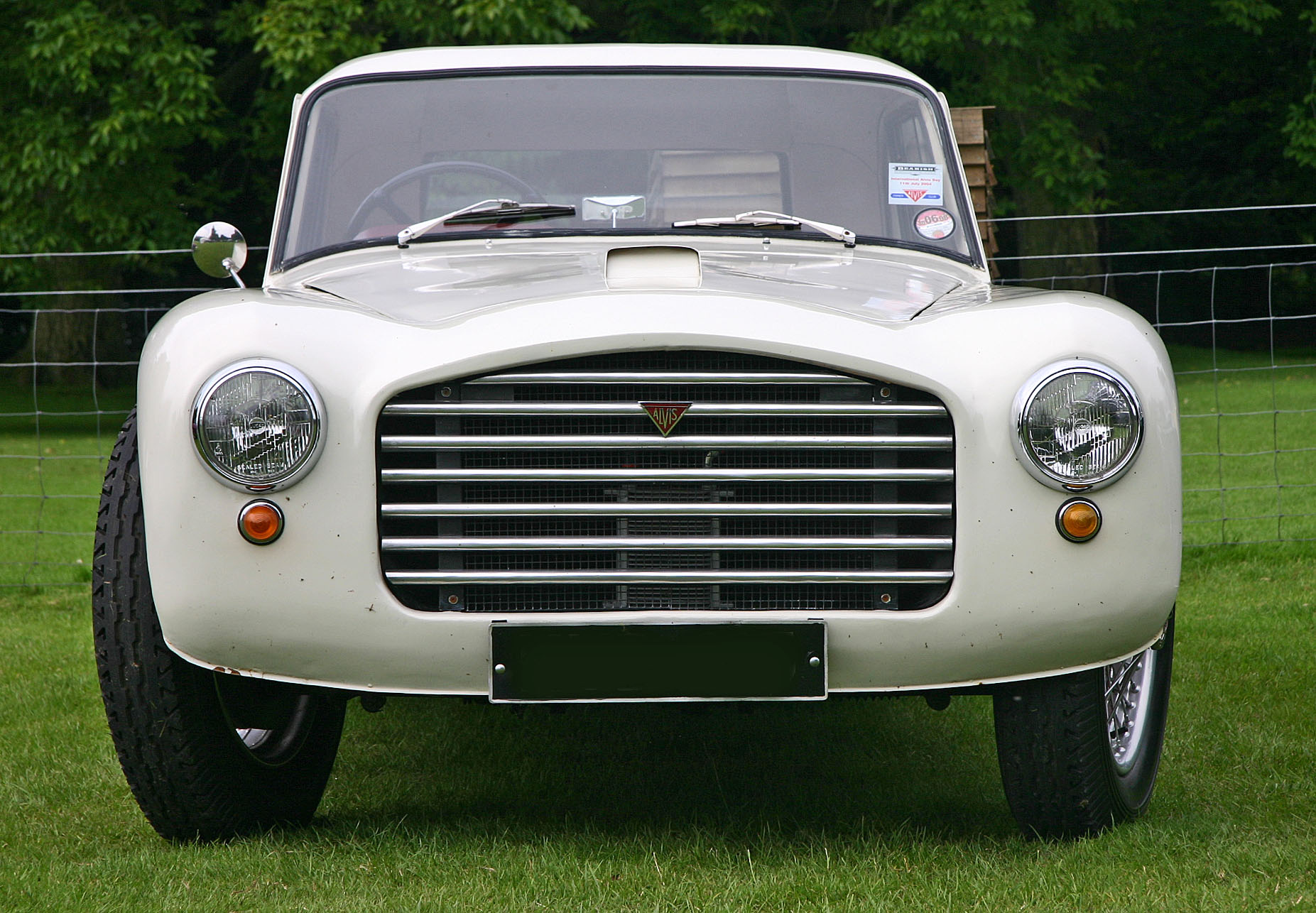
Alvis badge and 3litre engine

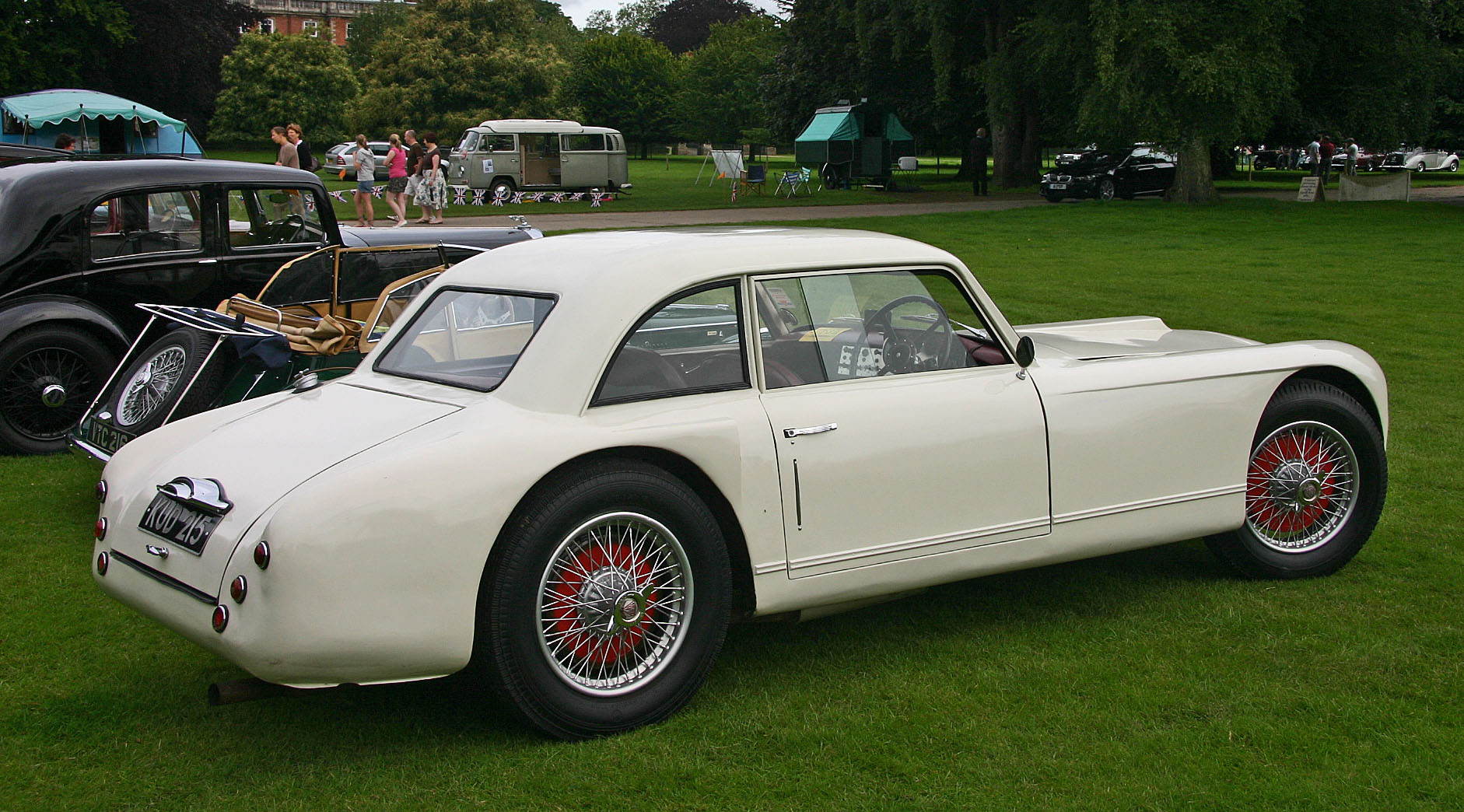
Aluminium body on 1933 Alvis

== See also ==
- List of car manufacturers of the United Kingdom
