= GL8 =

GL8 may refer to:

- Buick GL8, a minivan
- EMD GL8, a diesel-electric locomotive
