= 1700 class =

1700 class or Class 1700 may refer to:

- NS Class 1700, electric locomotives
- Queensland Railways 1700 class, diesel-electric locomotives
