= Wade supercharger =

Internal combustion engine compressor

The Wade supercharger was a Roots-type supercharger designed for internal combustion engines and produced from 1947 by the newly formed Wade Engineering Ltd, of Gatwick Airport, Horley, Surrey. The name 'WADE' comes from Winslett And DEnsham, after Bryan Winslett and Costin Densham.

== Company History ==
At the end of the war Leslie Mark Ballamy had the idea of repurposing war surplus Marshall cabin air blowers as superchargers for cars. Initially running under his own name, he left the business in 1946 and it was reorganised as North Downs Engineering Co (Nordec). Several members of NORDEC, including the chief designer and the managing director, Marcus Chambers, decided to make their own compressors and to do this created Wade Engineering Ltd at Gatwick airport late in 1947. The early units were sold under the "Ventor" trademark, but soon they became known as Wade superchargers.

The company moved premises to Crowhurst Road, Brighton in 1955. In the 1960s the company was taken over by Howden Engineering Ltd to become Howden Wade Ltd, though they remained at the same premises. In 1969 Sir George Godfrey and Partners (Holdings) Ltd merged with James Howden & Company Ltd under James Howden and Godfrey Ltd. This brought the Marshall superchargers (made by Godfrey and Partners) and the Wade superchargers under common ownership. In 1990 Adams Ricardo Ltd purchased the rights to the Wade and Godfrey compressor ranges from Howden.

== Technical Details ==
The Roots supercharger dates back to the 1860s, and this is the basis for the original Wade supercharger, but with patented modifications incorporated. The first patent of Costin and Densham deals with ways to achieve compression within the Roots-style blower. Although initially focussed on engine superchargers, they were soon to diversify into other application areas, including aircraft cabin pressurisation, refrigeration, reversible air motors and pneumatic conveying of powders and other materials.

== Applications ==
One of the early successes for the Wade blower was its fitment into the novel Commer TS3 engine. This unusual 2-stroke diesel engine had six opposed pistons operating in three cylinders and relied on a Wade blower to charge the cylinders. They were fitted to Commer and Karrier trucks and to Commer Avenger buses, though the engine was rather noisy for buses.
