= Marshall supercharger =

The Marshall supercharger (also known as the Godfrey supercharger) was a Roots-type supercharger based on a patent by John Wilmot Marshall in 1933

== Company History ==
The Marshall superchargers were initially manufactured by Marshall Drew and Co Ltd in the 1930s and marketed for increasing car performance. Toward the end of the 1930s Marshall superchargers were listed by Sir George Godfrey and Partners (Holdings) Ltd of Hanworth, Middlesex, made by them to the designs of J.W. Marshall. Godfrey continued to list the Marshall cabin blower until about 1951, after which they listed it as the Godfrey cabin supercharger.

In 1969 Sir George Godfrey and Partners (Holdings) Ltd merged with James Howden & Company Ltd under James Howden and Godfrey Ltd. One outcome of this was the merging of compressor interests, as Howden Wade Ltd carried the rights to the Wade supercharger. In 1990 Adams Ricardo Ltd purchased the rights to the Wade and Godfrey compressor ranges from Howden.

== Applications ==
While the supercharger was initially used for increasing the performance of sports cars such as the MG and Frazer Nash, in 1939 Sir George Godfrey and Partners suggested to the Air Ministry that they could be used for cabin pressurisation in aircraft, for which purpose many were made during WW2. The cabin pressurisation increased the altitude at which aircraft could fly and so was a closely guarded secret during the war. Immediately after the war Godfrey advertised their Marshall Cabin Blowers and stated their military model had been made since 1939 and had been tested to 50,000 ft. From 1951 Godfrey no longer refererred to them as Marshall cabin blowers, but rather as Godfrey cabin superchargers. Aircraft mentioned as using these in Godfrey's adverts include :

- Avro Tudor I (1946) - Britain's first pressurised airliner
- Handley-Page Hermes IV (1948)
- de Havilland Vampire fighter (1949)
- Bristol Brabazon I (1949)
- Bristol Type 175 turbo-prop (1950)
- Trans Canada Airline DC4-M2 (1950)
- BOAC Argonaut (1950)
- Avro Ashton (1950)
- Airspeed Ambassador (1951)
- Bristol Britannia (1953)
- Vickers Viscount (1953)
- Short Sperrin (1955)
- Fokker F27 Friendship (1955)
- Handley-Page Herald (1956)
- Fairchild Friendship (1957)
- Grummon Gulfstream (1958)
- Avro Vulcan (1958) and fitted to the Valiant and Victor
- Vickers Vanguard (1958).

In the 1960s Godfrey continued to make the Roots-type cabin air compressors (a development of the original Marshall), but also a screw-type compressor.

Surplus stores of these cabin superchargers (Marshall cabin blowers) were repurposed after the war and used for tuning cars (mainly for racing, hill-climbing, etc.). This was started by Leslie Ballamy of L. M. Ballamy Ltd, Consulting and Experimental Engineers, who started supercharging RAF officers' cars using the surplus blowers. After a falling out between Ballamy and the company sponsor in 1946, Ballamy left and the company was reformed as North Downs Engineering Co Ltd (a.k.a. Nordec), and marketed the Marshall-Nordec supercharger kits for a wide range of cars. However key members of the Nordec company left late in 1947 to form Wade Superchargers Ltd.

Sir George Godfrey and Partners launched the K200 Marshall supercharger after the war, designed for the commercial vehicle market. In 1948 Crossley produced an 8.6 litre oil engine with twin Marshall blowers which increased its output from 100 bhp to 150 bhp at 1750rpm. Other manufacturers to use Marshall superchargers on at least some of their engines include Dennis in 1951 and Kromhout in 1953. In 1955 the huge Rotinoff GR7 Atlantic transport tractor was announced, designed for road haulage of large loads such as tank transport, this had a Rolls-Royce C6 SFL six-cylinder engine with a Godfrey Roots-type supercharger. However the commercial vehicle market (and many performance cars) moved from engine driven superchargers to exhaust driven turbochargers in subsequent decades.
