= EMD GL8 =

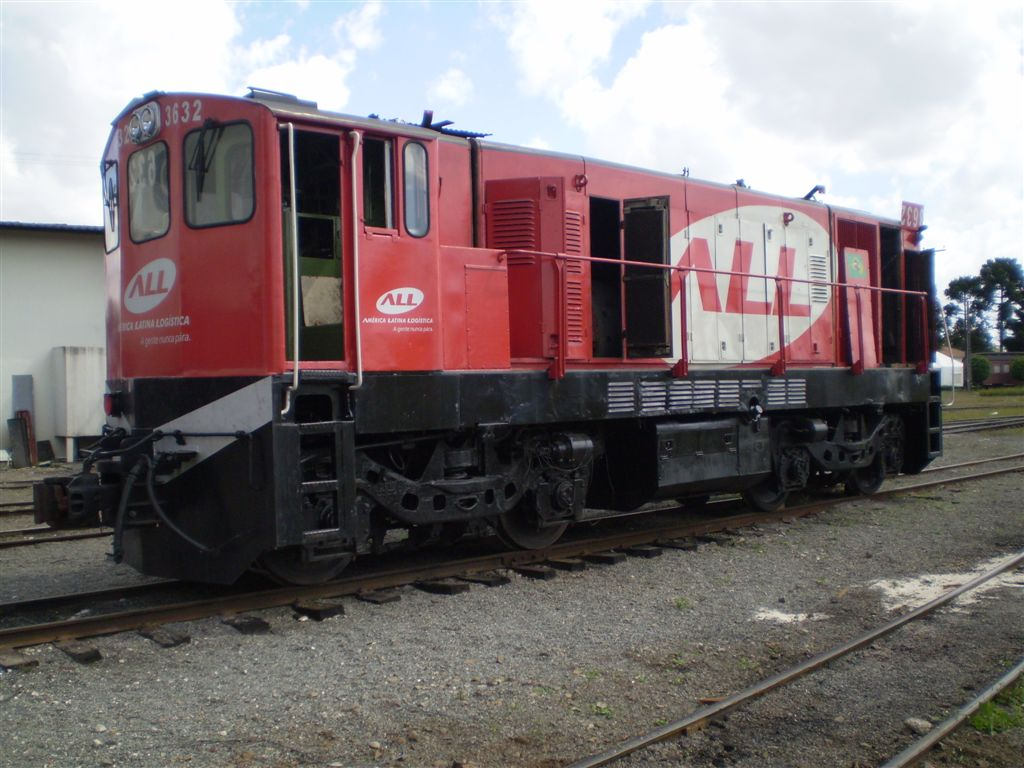
- An ALL EMD GL8
Type and origin
- Power type: Diesel-electric
- Builder: GM-EMD La Grange, Illinois, USA
- Model: GL8
- Build date: June 1960 - July 1965
- Total produced: B-B version: 96; A1A-A1A version: 53
Specifications
- Configuration
  - AAR: B-B or A1A-A1A
- Gauge: 1,000 mm (3 ft 3 3/8 in); 3 ft 6 in (1,067 mm); 4 ft 8 1/2 in (1,435 mm); 5 ft 3 in (1,600 mm); 5 ft 6 in (1,676 mm)
- Driver dia.: 40 in (1,016 mm)
- Length: 36 ft 2 in (11.02 m)
- Width: 8 ft 9 in (2.67 m)
- Height: 12 ft 7 in (3.84 m) High clearance cab or 12 ft 0 in (3.66 m) Low clearance cab
- Prime mover: GM 8-567CR
- Engine type: V8 2-stroke diesel
- Aspiration: Roots blower
- Cylinders: 8
- Loco brake: Straight air
- Train brakes: Air or Vacuum schedule 26-LA or 27-LA
Performance figures
- Maximum speed: 124km/h 77.05 mph
- Power output: 875 hp (652 kW)
Career
- Disposition: Many scrapped, some preserved, others still operating

The EMD GL8 is an export diesel-electric locomotive introduced by General Motors Electro-Motive Division (EMD) in 1960. They have been designed as light locomotives with a low axle loading. Measuring 36 feet 2 inches over the end sills, they are equipped an EMD 8-567CR engine producing 875 hp (652 kW) for traction, driving four traction motors in either A1A-A1A or B-B flexicoil trucks. The EMD GA8 is a derivative designed for very light lines with extremely sharp curves using frame mounted traction motors and freight car trucks.

Several countries have purchased GL8 locomotives.

== Original owners ==
=== A1A-A1A version ===
- 12 Taiwan, 3 ft 6 in (1,067 mm)
  - 12 Taiwan Railway S201–S212 (S201-S207 are the first production GL8 locomotives, which have the locomotive bell mounted on the top of the engine compartment, a feature unique to these locomotives)
- 41 East Pakistan, (now Bangladesh)
  - 41 East Bengal Railways 2201–2241 (1,000 mm (3 ft 3 3/8 in)) Still operational with Bangladesh Railway.

=== B-B version ===
- 69 Brazil, 1,000 mm (3 ft 3 3/8 in):
  - 8 Rede Mineira de Viação 2851–2858
  - 23 Companhia Mogiana de Estradas de Ferro 51–73
  - 5 Estrada de Ferro Noroeste do Brasil 1001–1005
  - 18 Rede de Viação Paraná-Santa Catarina 1401–1418
  - 15 Estrada de Ferro Sorocabana 3601–3615
- 15 Republic of Ireland, 5 ft 3 in (1,600 mm)
  - 15 Córas Iompair Éireann 121 Class B121–B135
- 12 Tunisia, 1,000 mm (3 ft 3 3/8 in) and / or 4 ft 8 1/2 in (1,435 mm)
  - 12 Société Nationale de Chemins de Fer Tunisiens 040DF351–040DF362

=== C-C version ===
- 12 Australia, 1,067 mm (3 ft 6 in)
  - 12 Queensland Railways 1700 class 1700-1711 (Built by Clyde Engineering)

== Gallery ==
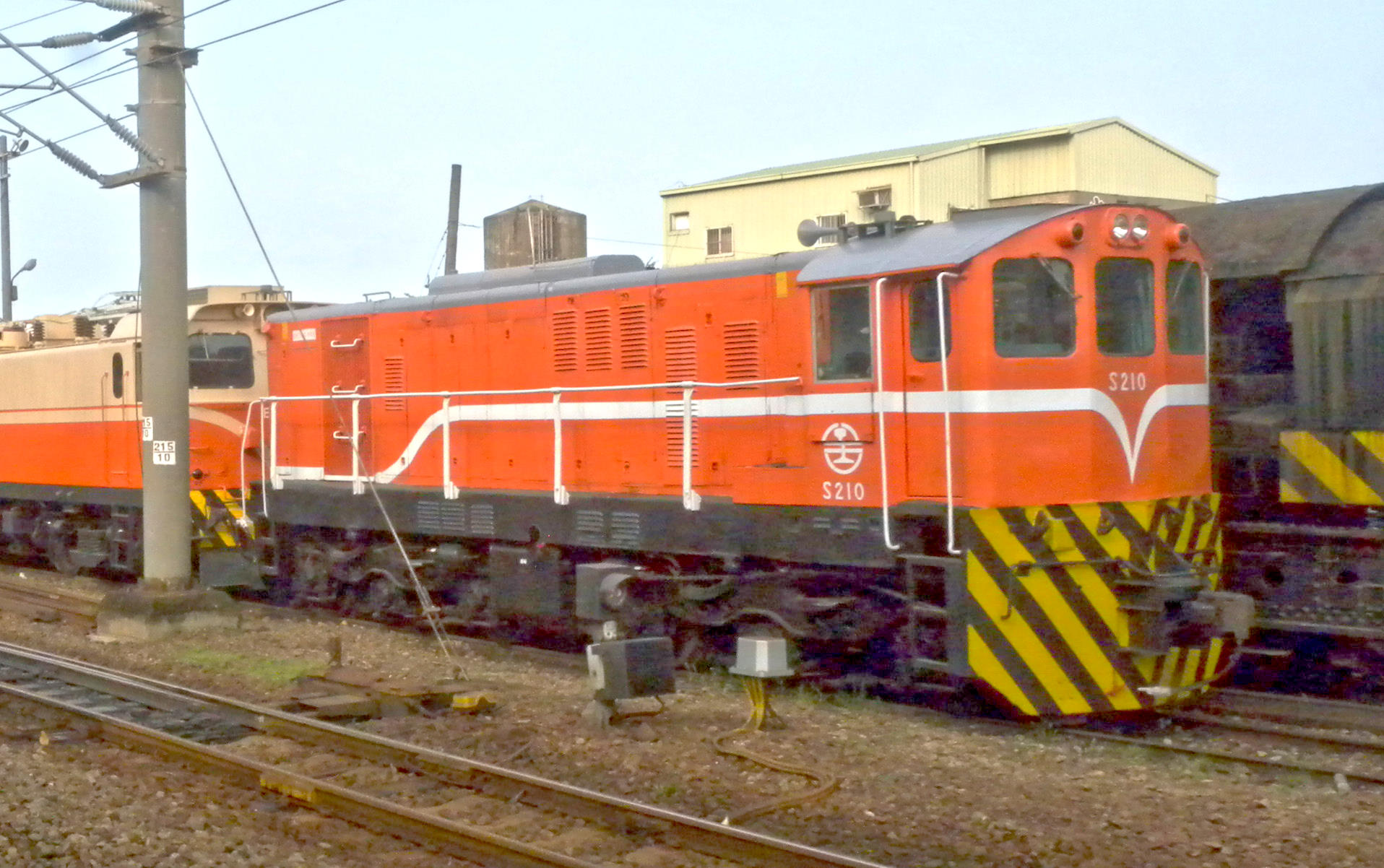
Taiwan Railway Administration S210

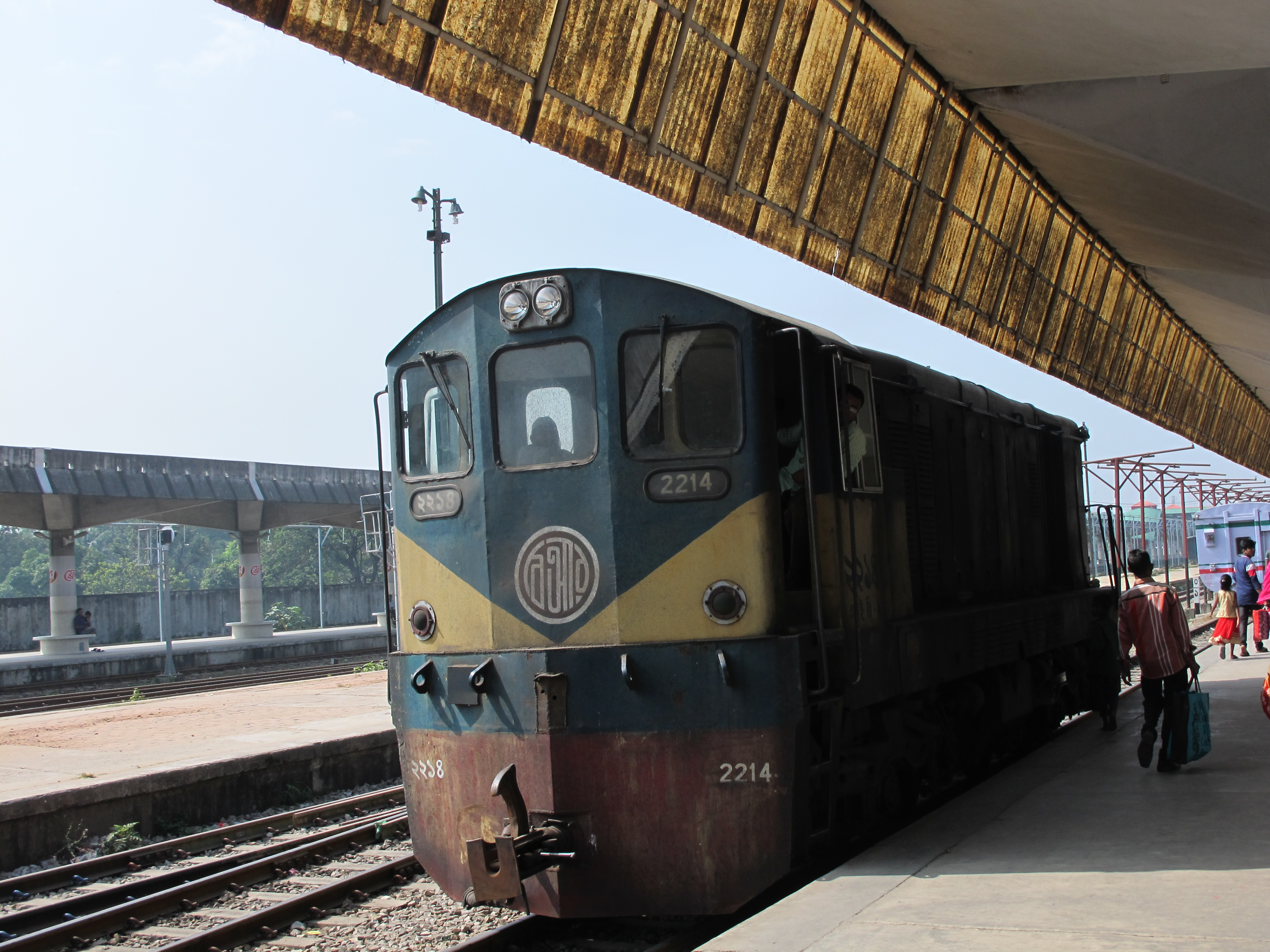
Bangladesh Railway 2214

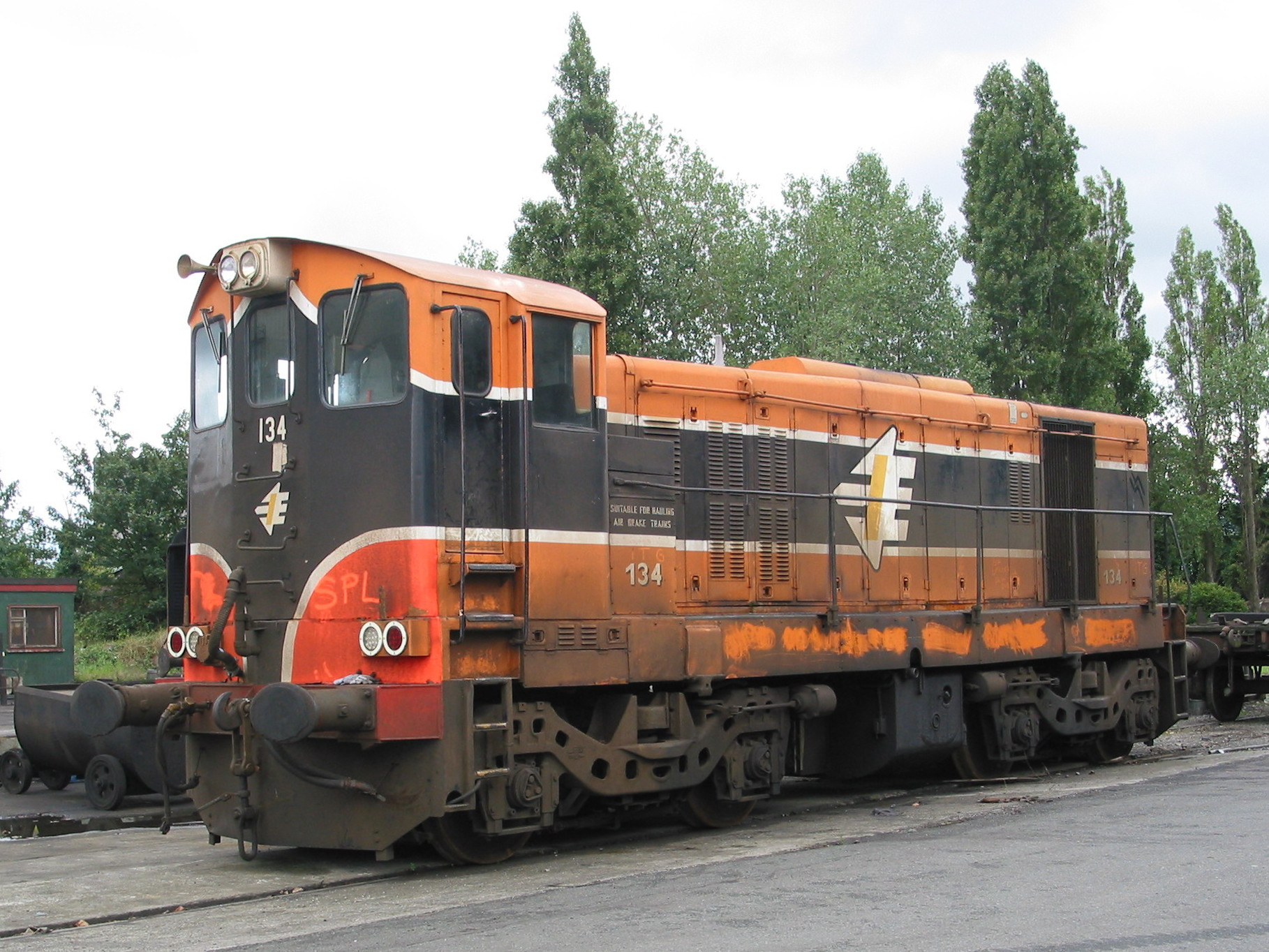
Córas Iompair Éireann 134

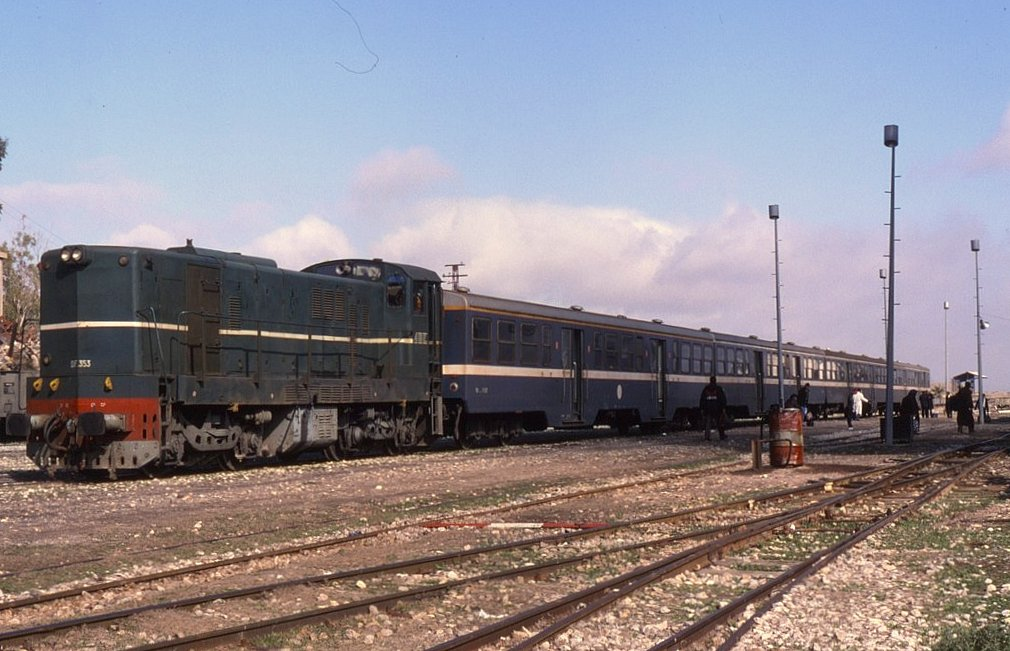
Société Nationale des Chemins de Fer Tunisiens 040-DF-353

== See also ==
- List of GM-EMD locomotives
