= Roots Blower Company =

Defunct American engineering company

- Industry: Engineering
- Founded: 1859
- Founders: Philander Higley Roots; Francis Marion Roots
- Defunct: 1931
- Fate: Acquired by International Derrick and Equipment Company and merged with Connersville Blower Company to form Roots-Connersville Blower Company
- Headquarters: Connersville, Indiana, United States
- Parent: Chart Industries, Inc; Ingersoll Rand; Dresser Industries; Enovis; General Electric; KPS Capital Partners

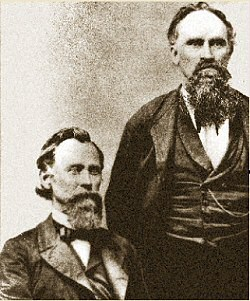
Philander and Francis Roots, founders of Roots Blower Company

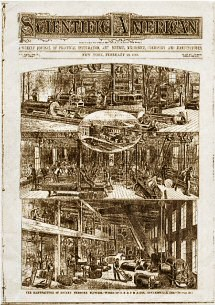
Cover story of February 1880 Scientific American magazine, Manufacture of Rotary Pressure Blowers at Roots, Indiana

A Roots blower with two-lobed rotors. Modern Roots blowers may have 2- or 3-lobed rotors. Key: 1. Rotary vane; 2. Pump body; 1. Intake; 2. Pumping; 3. Output; 3. Rotary vane

The Roots Blower Company was an American engineering company based in Connersville, Indiana. It was founded in 1854 by the inventors Philander Higley Roots and Francis Marion Roots. It is notable for the Roots blower, a type of pump. Today, Roots blowers are mainly used as air pumps in superchargers for internal combustion engines; they were first used in blast furnaces to blow combustion air to melt iron.

== History ==
=== Legend of origin ===
The Roots brothers located their business in Connersville, Indiana, as the Whitewater Canal provided a convenient 11-foot (3.35 metre) drop, suitable for an undershot mill wheel. When this proved insufficiently powerful, Philander Roots built a more efficient "water motor" to exploit the power source. However, the lobe impellers were made of wood, which warped and caused the motor to jam when used under water. As the brothers studied the problem on dry land, one of them rotated a shaft, causing the impellers to spin in the air, "blowing off his brother's hat". This attracted the attention of the superintendent of an iron foundry, who observed to Roots that it could be used to help melt iron. Roots followed up the idea by designing the Roots blower, "now (1931) the leading product of the plant". The foundry superintendent was given the role of foundry foreman at Roots Blower.

=== Company history ===
The Roots brothers patented the Roots Blower in 1860. In 1869 they were granted a patent by the United Kingdom Patent Office for the invention of "improvements in rotary blowing machines."

In 1875, Roots exhibited a blower at the Saint Petersburg Exhibition; Thwaites and Carbutt exhibited a Roots principle "air blowing machine" for mine ventilation in the same exhibition.

In 1885, Edgar Dwight Johnston joined the firm of 30 people; he became vice president in 1889 and president in 1898, remaining so until at least 1931. At that time, the firm employed about 225 people.

In 1900, Gottlieb Daimler patented a Roots supercharger for a car's internal combustion engine.

In 1931, Roots Blower Company and Connersville Blower Company were bought by the International Derrick and Equipment Company to found Roots-Connersville Blower Company. The same year, the company began production of centrifugal compressors.

During World War II, the company made screw compressors for U.S. Navy submarines, which they used to blow ballast water.

From 1944, Roots became a product brand of Dresser Industries. In 2010 Dresser was acquired by GE and integrated into the GE Energy Services and Power & Water business units. Five years later in 2015, the Roots company was acquired by Colfax Corporation, and became a part of Colfax's UK based engineering company Howden. In 2023, Chart Industries purchased Howden and quickly divested of Roots in a sale to Ingersoll Rand.

== Current production ==
The Roots factory is still located in Connersville, Indiana and produces a range of positive displacement blowers and centrifugal compressors.

== Founders ==
Francis Roots was born in Oxford, Ohio on 28 October 1824 to Alanson Roots and Sylvia Yale. He married Esther E. Pumphrey on 8 October 1850. He died in Connersville on 25 October 1889. His brother Philander died in Connersville in 1879.

== See also ==
- Supercharger — for a comparison of Roots with other types
