= EMD GA8 =

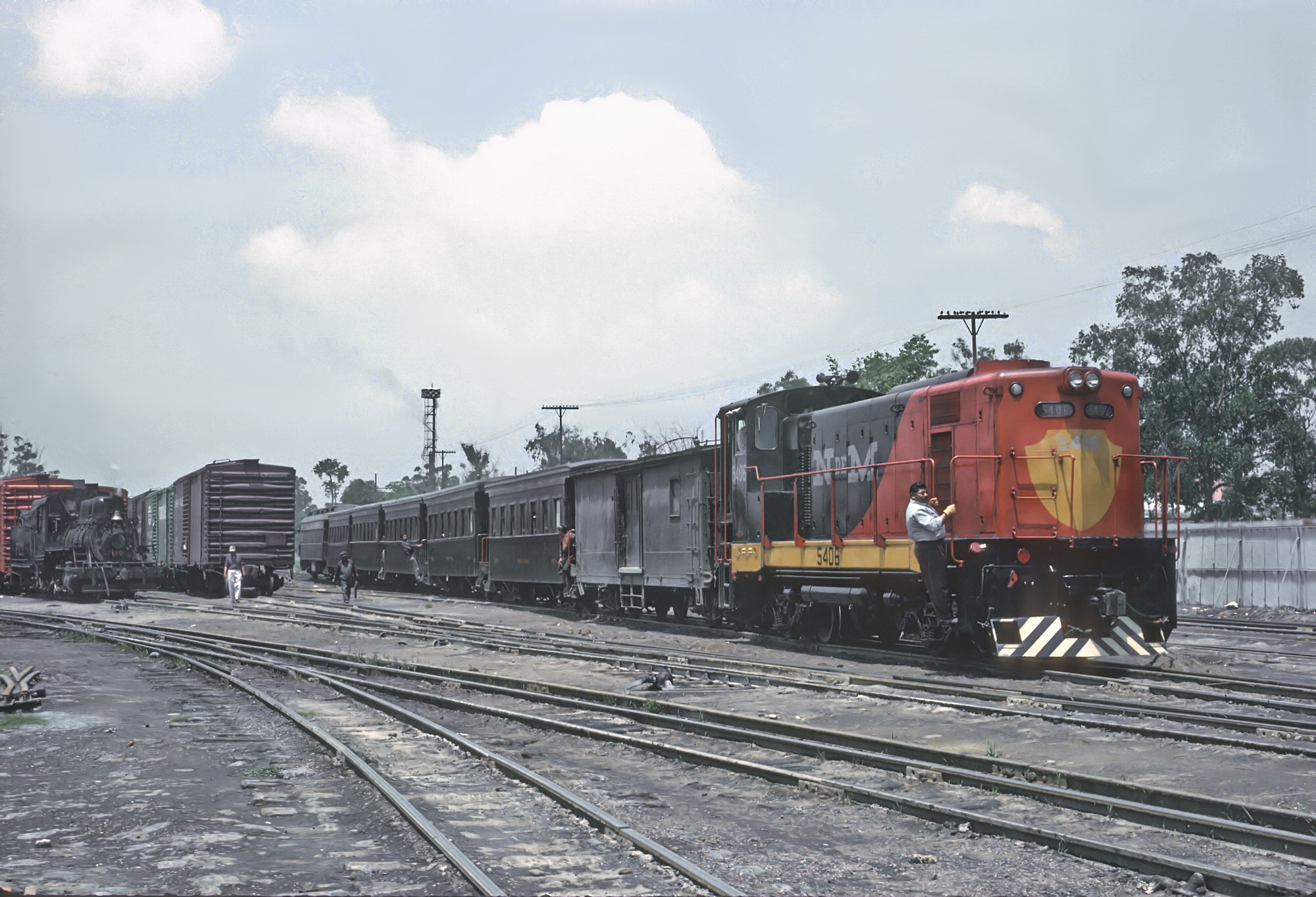
- NdeM No. 5406 in 1966
Type and origin
- Power type: Diesel-electric
- Builder: GM-EMD La Grange, Illinois, USA
- Model: GA8
- Build date: December 1958 - February 1968
- Total produced: 94
Specifications
- Configuration
  - AAR: B-B
- Gauge: 1,000 mm (3 ft 3 3/8 in); 3 ft 6 in (1,067 mm); 4 ft 8 1/2 in (1,435 mm); 5 ft 6 in (1,676 mm)
- Trucks: AAR standard
- Driver dia.: 32 in (813 mm)
- Wheelbase: 5 ft 8 in (1.73 m) (Each truck)
- Length: 32 ft 6 in (9.91 m)
- Width: 8 ft 9 in (2.67 m)
- Height: 12 ft 10 1/2 in (3.92 m) High clearance cab or 12 ft 0 in (3.66 m) Low clearance cab
- Axle load: 13 t (12.8 long tons; 14.3 short tons)
- Loco weight: 104,000 lb (47,170 kg) (52T)
- Prime mover: GM 8-567C, GM 8-567E (post 1965)
- Engine type: V8 2-stroke diesel
- Aspiration: Roots blower
- Alternator: GM D14 DC
- Traction motors: Two D75MC DC
- Cylinders: 8
- Transmission: 63:14 gear ratio
- Loco brake: Straight air & Disc brake on drive shaft
- Train brakes: Air or Vacuum schedule 26-LA
Performance figures
- Maximum speed: 45 mph (72 km/h)
- Power output: 800 hp (600 kW)
Career
- Locale: North America, Central America, South America, Africa, East Asia
- Disposition: Many scrapped, some preserved, others still operating

The EMD GA8 is an export diesel locomotive designed by GM-EMD in the late 1950s as a simplified design for use on overseas railways with light rail and sharp curves. At the time of its introduction it was described as an extremely lightweight road locomotive capable of handling passenger or freight trains and switching. The locomotive is notable for its use of freight car trucks that are driven by cardan shafts and two traction motors attached to the underframe. Measuring 32 feet 6 inches, they are equipped with an 8-567C prime mover capable of producing 875 bhp or 800 hp traction. Late model GA8 locomotives were equipped with an 8-567E prime mover which is a 645 block (introduced in 1965) fitted with 567 power assemblies. Due to the design, most servicing and maintenance could be done without removing the traction motors from the underframe or trucks of the locomotive.

The EMD GL8 is a derivative design introduced in 1960 that is similar to the GA8 but uses standard B-B or A1A-A1A trucks and was equipped with multiple unit capability. The EMD GA8 prototype demonstrator unit was built in late 1958 or early 1959 and export customer production commenced in 1960. The GA8 demonstrator also attracted considerable attention from several US railroads, although ultimately none would ever purchase the locomotive for domestic use. Several countries purchased the locomotive and examples are still in operation today.

== Original Owners ==
=== Argentina ===
- 15 Sarmiento Railway 5551–5565. The 5554 and 5561 locomotive, receive change gauge and transferred to the Urquiza line.

=== Chile ===
- 3 Antofagasta y Bolivia 950–952

=== Colombia ===
- 2 National Railways of Colombia 501–502

=== El Salvador ===
- 16 International Railways of Central America, El Salvador Division, later Ferrocarriles Nacionales de El Salvador (National Railways of El Salvador) 851–866

=== Mexico ===
- 22 Coahuila y Zacatecas 800–802; NdeM 5400–5416; Unidos de Yucatán 204–205

=== Peru ===
- 3 Cerro de Pasco 21–23. Ownership then transferred to CENTROMIN and later to Doe Run Peru.

=== South Africa ===
- 4 Anglo-American Corp. 1–2; Union Lime 1–2

=== South Korea ===
- 2 Fluor Corp. (No #); Korean Oil 3

=== Taiwan ===
- 2 Taiwan Railway Administration S301-S321

=== United States ===
- 1 Electro-Motive Division demonstrator

=== Zambia ===
- 5 Nchanga Consol Copper 8–12

== Gallery ==
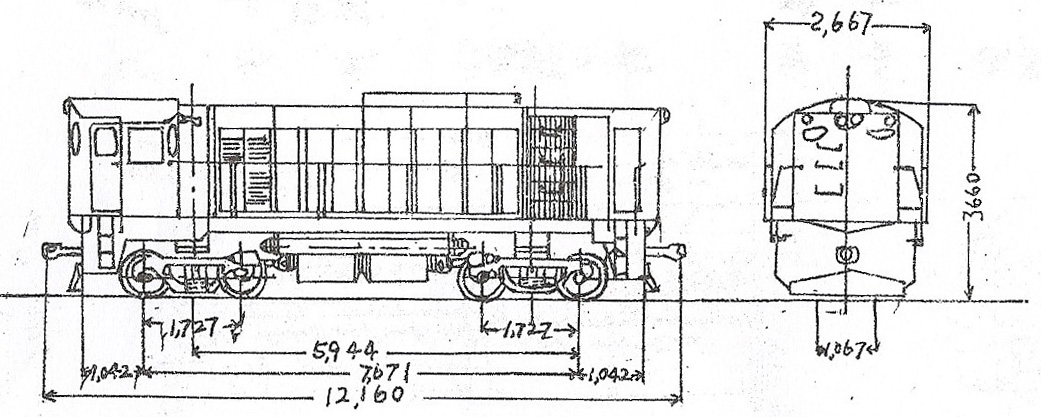
EMD GA8 line drawing

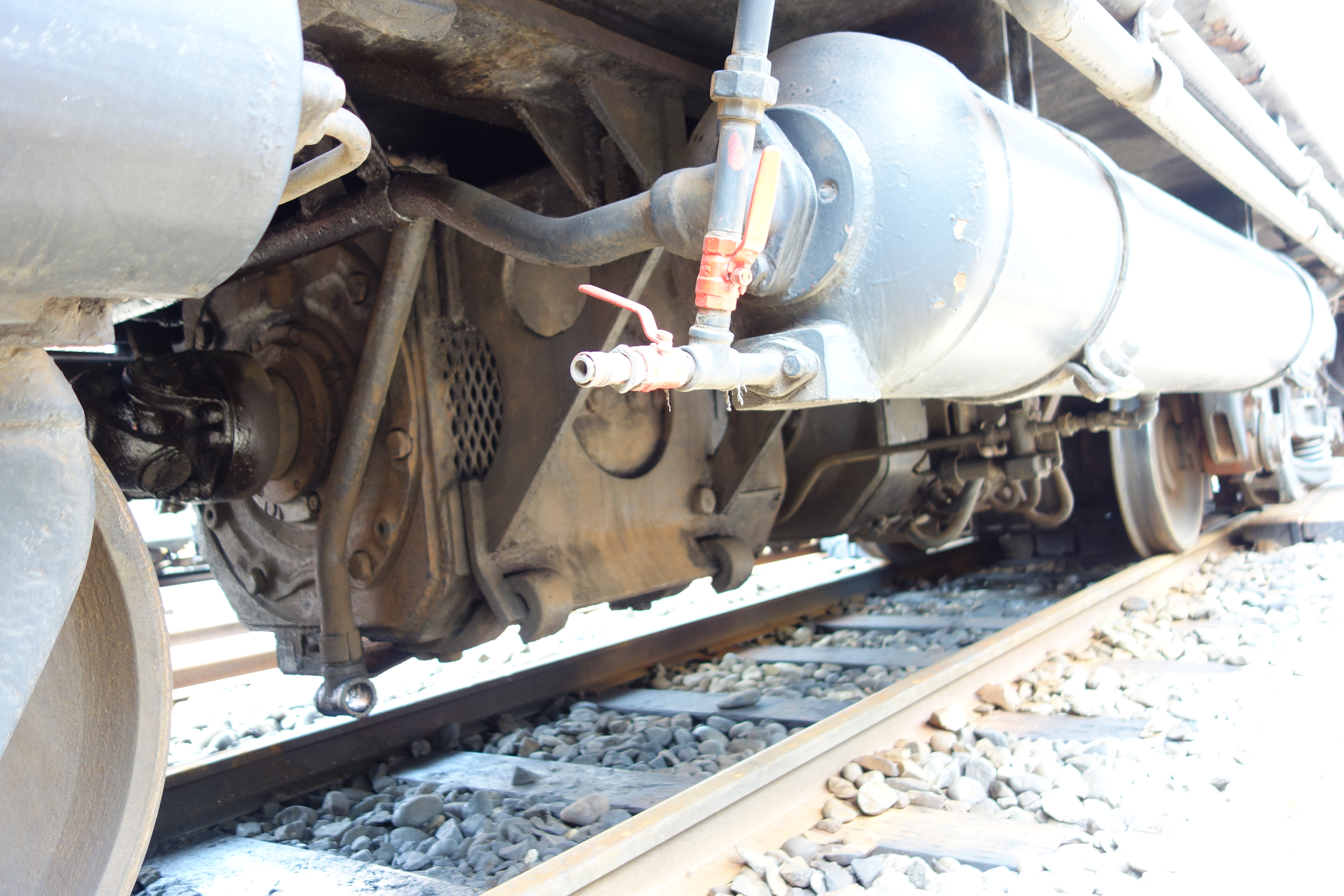
View of frame mounted traction motors

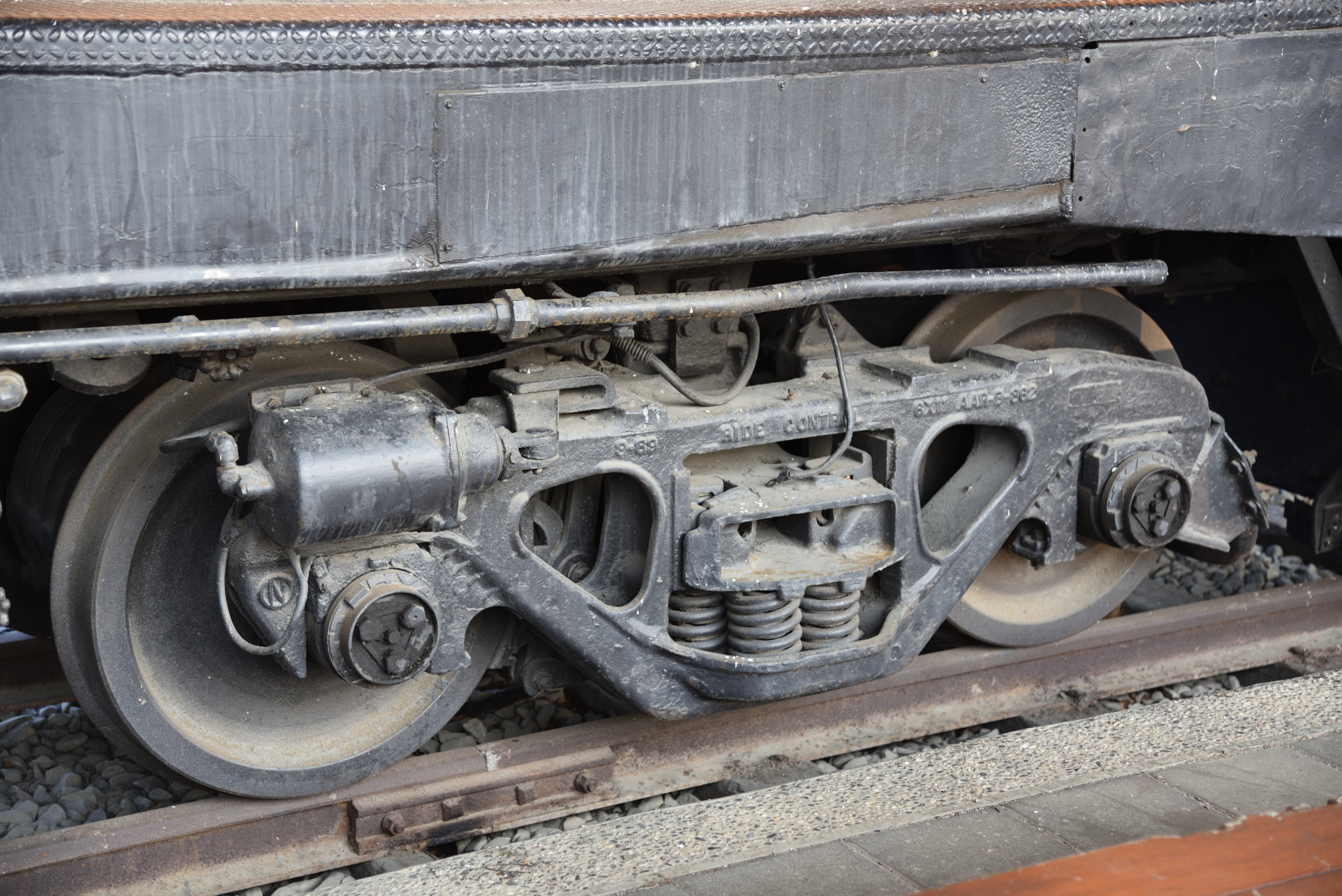
The GA8 uses standard AAR freight car trucks

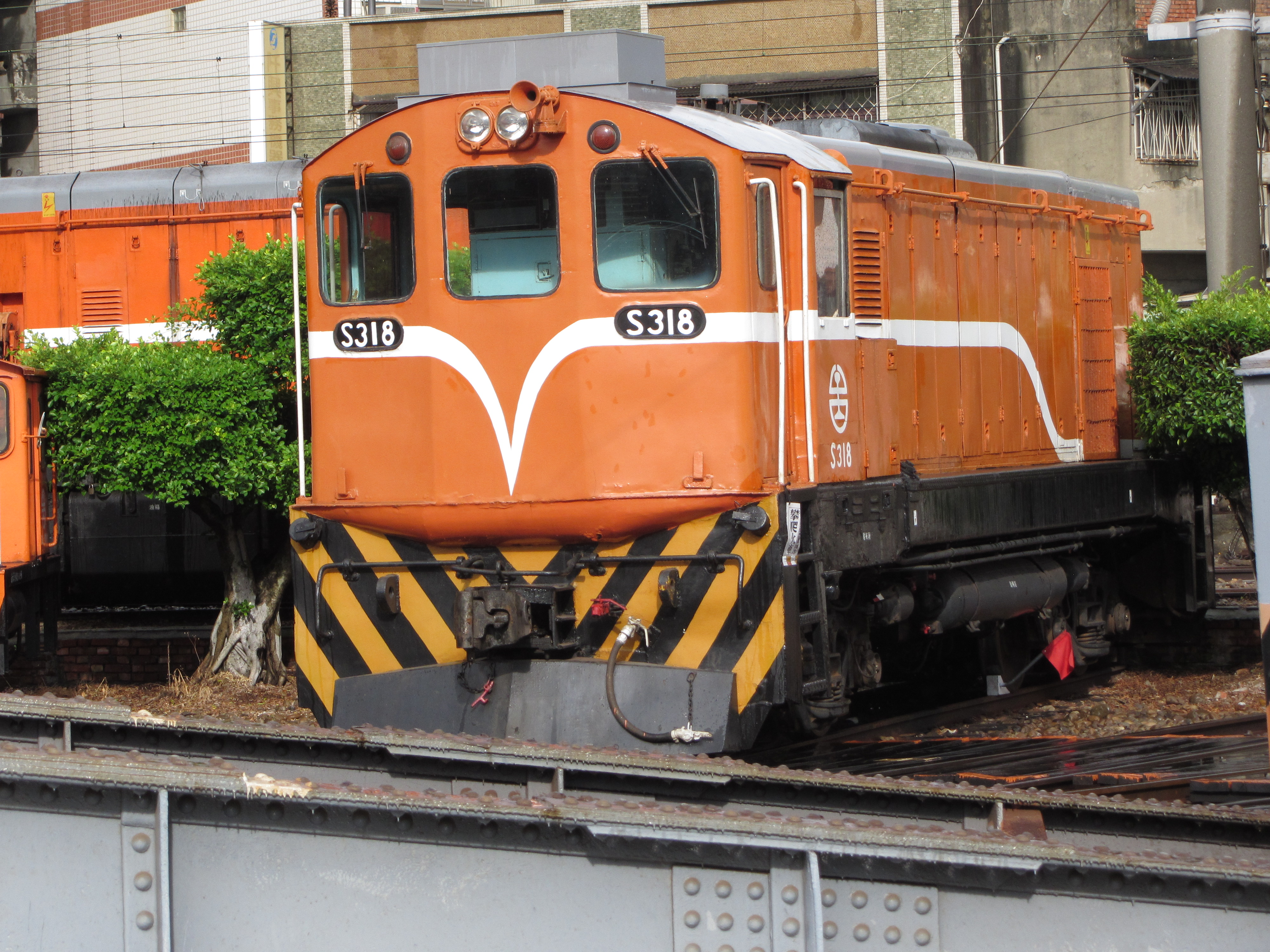
Taiwan Railway Administration S318

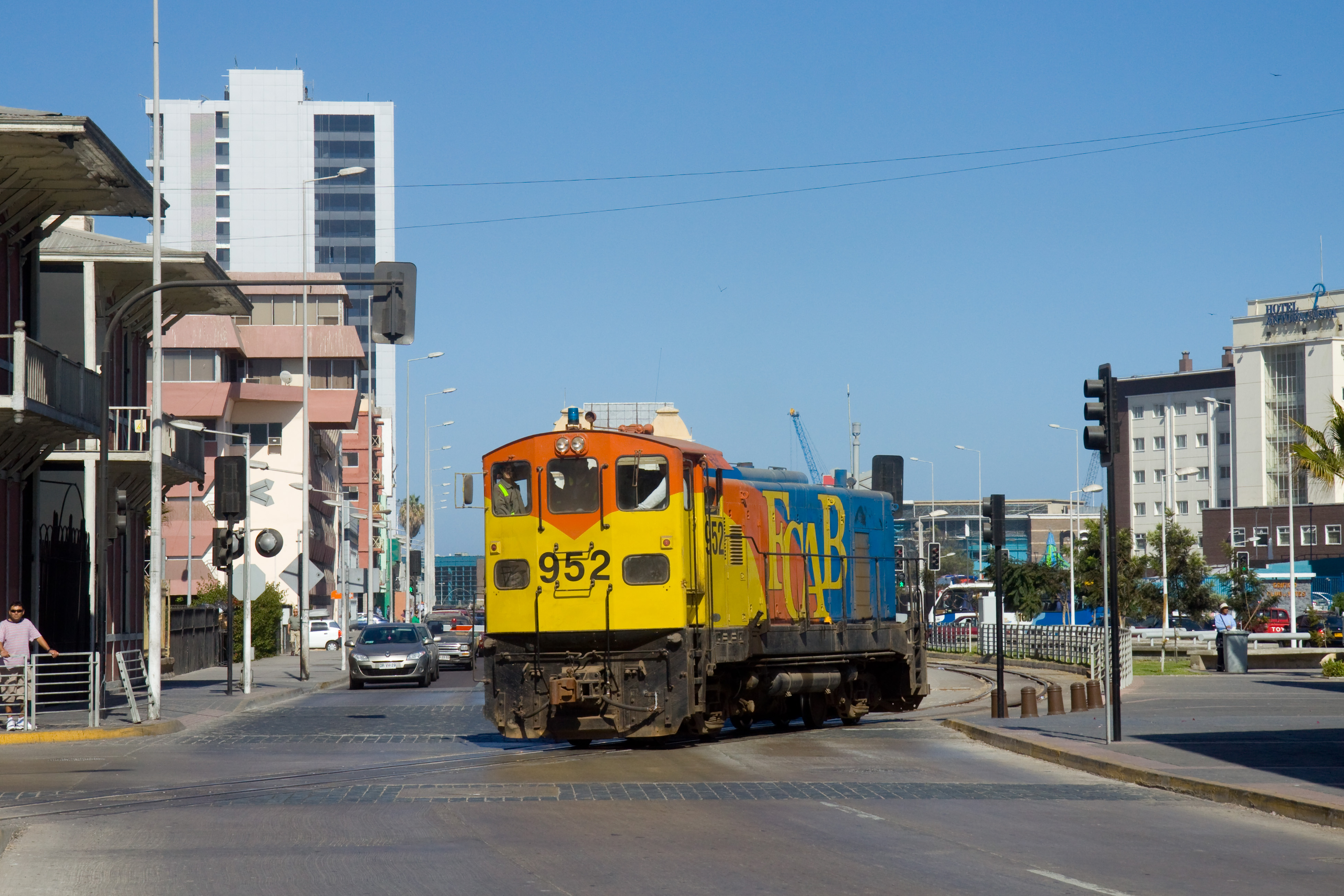
FCAB (Antofagasta y Bolivia) 952

FENADESAL 864
