= Queensland Railways 1700 class =

Class of Australian Co′Co′ diesel-electric locomotives

Type and origin
- Power type: Diesel-electric
- Builder: Clyde Engineering, Eagle Farm
- Serial number: 63-275 to 63-286
- Model: Electro-Motive Diesel GL8C
- Build date: 1963
- Total produced: 12
Specifications
- Configuration
  - UIC: Co-Co
- Gauge: 1,067 mm (3 ft 6 in)
- Length: 13.36 m (43 ft 10 in)
- Loco weight: 59 t (58 long tons; 65 short tons)
- Fuel type: Diesel
- Prime mover: Electro-Motive Diesel 567C
- Generator: Electro-Motive Diesel D25E
- Traction motors: Electro-Motive Diesel CD36
- Cylinders: 8
Performance figures
- Maximum speed: 80 km/h (50 mph)
- Power output: 652 kW (874 hp)
Career
- Operators: Queensland Railways
- Number in class: 12
- Numbers: 1700–1711
- First run: June 1963
- Last run: December 2000
- Disposition: 1 preserved, 11 scrapped

The 1700 class is a class of diesel locomotives built by Clyde Engineering, Eagle Farm for Queensland Railways in 1963.

== History ==
Initially the 1700 class operated branch line services out of Roma before being relegated to shunting duties. Later they were modified for driver only operation receiving a larger windscreen. They were withdrawn in 2000. 1706 was written-off in the 1987 Bindango Derailment. 1707 (without bogies) is privately owned and stored at the Zig Zag Railway. The cab of 1710 is at the Workshops Rail Museum, converted to a driving simulator.

As of September 2025, 1707D is now back on bogies and transferred to storage (possible restoration) at the Zig Zag Railway, Clarence NSW. This means that there are now no complete Class 1700 locomotives in Queensland.
