= Roots blower =

Positive-displacement lobe pump

A Roots blower with two-lobed rotors. Most real Roots blowers' rotors have three or four lobes. (animated version) Key: 1. Rotary vane 1; 2. Pump body; 3. Rotary vane 2; 1. Intake; 2. Pumping; 3. Output

The Roots blower is a positive displacement lobe pump which operates by pumping a fluid with a pair of meshing lobes resembling a set of stretched gears. Fluid is trapped in pockets surrounding the lobes and carried from the intake side to the exhaust.

The Roots blower design does not incorporate any reduction in volume/increase in pressure as air or other fluid passes through, hence it can best be described as a blower rather than a supercharger unlike some other designs of "supercharger" such as cozette, centric, Shorrock supercharger, Powerplus supercharger and also the axial flow Eaton type supercharger which have internal "compression".

The most common application of the Roots-type blower has been the induction device on two-stroke diesel engines, such as those produced by Detroit Diesel and Electro-Motive Diesel. Roots-type blowers are also used to supercharge four-stroke Otto cycle engines, with the blower being driven from the engine's crankshaft via a toothed or V-belt, a roller chain or a gear train.

The Roots-type blower is named after American inventors and brothers Philander and Francis Marion Roots, founders of the Roots Blower Company of Connersville, Indiana, who patented the basic design in 1860 as an air pump for use in blast furnaces and other industrial applications. In 1900, Gottlieb Daimler included a Roots-style blower in a patented engine design, making the Roots-type blower the oldest of the various designs available. Roots blowers are commonly referred to as air blowers or PD (positive displacement) blowers.

== Applications ==
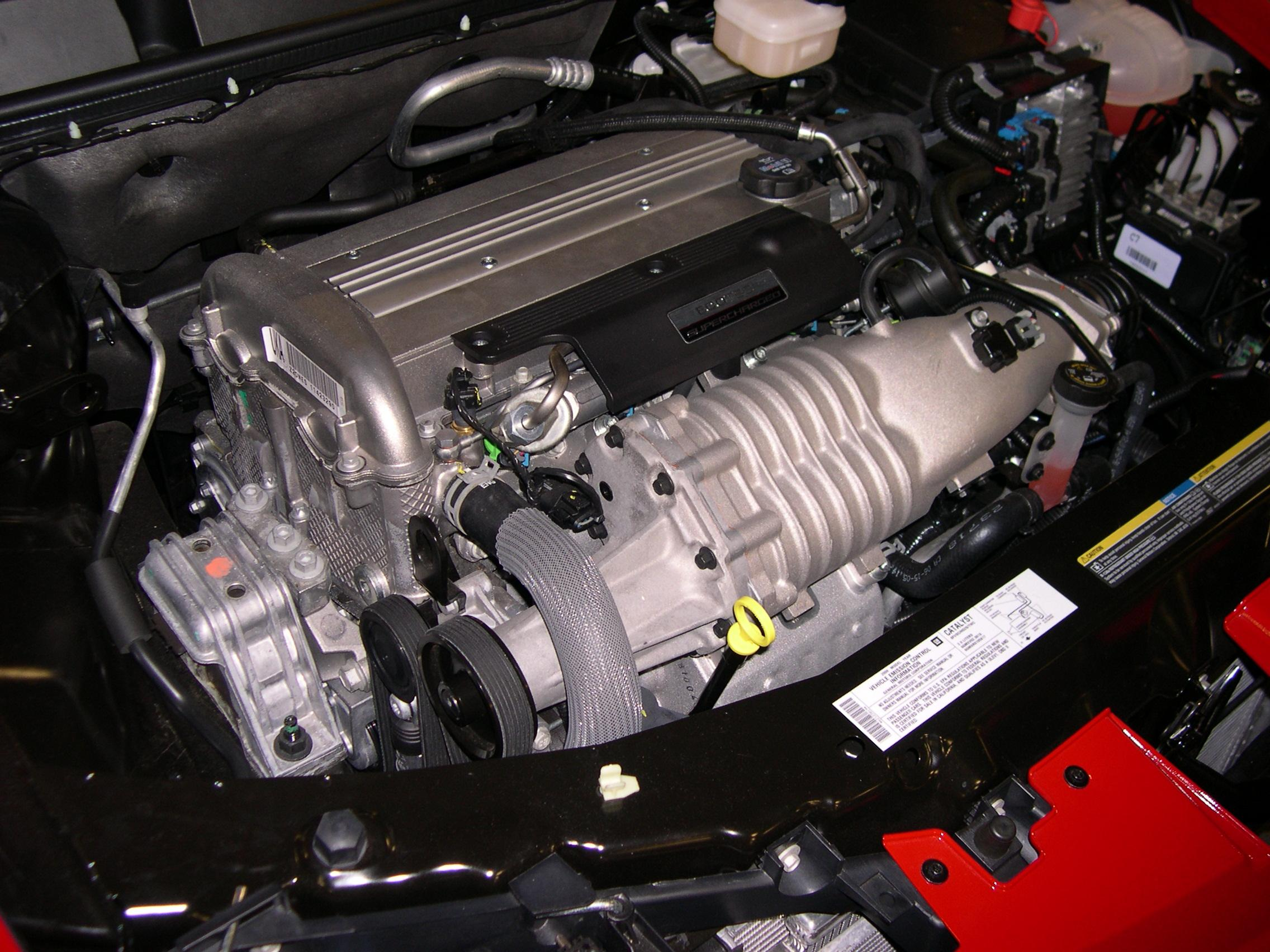
An Eaton M62 roots-type supercharger is visible at the front of this Ecotec LSJ engine in a 2006 Saturn Ion Red Line.

The Roots-type blower is simple and widely used. It can be more effective than alternative superchargers at developing positive intake manifold pressure (i.e., above atmospheric pressure) at low engine speeds, making it a popular choice for passenger automobile applications. Peak torque can be achieved by about 2,000 rpm. Unlike the basic illustration, most modern Roots-type superchargers incorporate three-lobe or four-lobe rotors; this allows the lobes to have a slight twist along the rotor axes, which reduces pulsing in the input and output (this is impractical with two lobes, as even a slight twist could open up a free path through the supercharger at certain angles).

Accumulated heat is an important consideration in the operation of a compressor in an internal combustion engine. Of the three basic supercharger types, the Roots design historically possessed the worst thermal efficiency, especially at high pressure ratios. In accordance with the ideal gas law, a compression operation will raise the temperature of the compressed output. Additionally, the operation of the compressor itself requires energy input, which is converted to heat and can be transferred to the gas through the compressor housing, heating it more. Although intercoolers are more commonly known for their use on turbochargers, superchargers may also benefit from the use of an intercooler. Internal combustion is based upon a thermodynamic cycle, and a lower temperature of the intake charge results in a greater thermodynamic expansion and vice versa. A hot intake charge provokes detonation in a petrol engine, and can melt the pistons in a diesel, while an intercooling stage adds complexity but can improve the power output by increasing the amount of the input charge, exactly as if the engine were of higher capacity. An intercooler reduces the thermodynamic efficiency by losing the heat (power) introduced by compression, but increases the power available because of the increased working mass for each cycle. Above about 5 psi (35 kPa) the intercooling improvement can become dramatic. With a Roots-type supercharger, one method successfully employed is the addition of a thin heat exchanger placed between the blower and the engine. Water is circulated through it to a second unit placed near the front of the vehicle where a fan and the ambient air-stream can dissipate the collected heat.

Animation showing the flow direction through a three-lobe Roots blower with a slight twist to the rotors

The Roots design was commonly used on two-stroke diesel engines (popularized by the Detroit Diesel [truck and bus] and Electro-Motive [railroad] divisions of General Motors), which require some form of forced induction, because there is no separate intake stroke. The Rootes Co. two-stroke diesel engine, used in Commer and Karrier vehicles, had a Roots-type blower; the two companies are not related.

The superchargers used on top fuel engines, funny cars, and other dragsters, as well as hot rods, are in fact derivatives of General Motors Coach Division blowers for their industrial diesel engines, which were adapted for automotive use in drag racing. The model name of these units delineates their size - the once-commonly used 4–71 and 6–71 blowers were designed for 71 series diesels. Current competition dragsters use aftermarket GMC variants similar in design to the 71 series, but with the rotor and case length increased for added capacity; hot rodders also use reproduction 6-71s.

Roots blowers are typically used in applications where a large volume of air must be moved across a relatively small pressure differential. This includes low vacuum applications, with the Roots blower acting alone, or in combination with other pumps as part of a high vacuum system. One very common industrial application is in pneumatic conveying systems, the blower delivering a high volume of air for the movement of bulk solids through pipes.

Some civil defense sirens used Roots blowers to pump air to the rotor (chopper) so as to drastically increase its sound output through all pitch ranges. The most well known are the Federal Signal Thunderbolt Series, and ACA (now American Signal Corporation) Hurricane. These sirens are known as "supercharged sirens".

Roots blowers are also used in reverse to measure the flow of gases or liquids, for example, in gas meters.

Roots blowers were used for cabin pressurisation in aircraft, initially being investigated immediately before WW2 (using the Marshall supercharger) and made by companies such as Sir George Godfrey and Partners who were still shipping increasing numbers into the 1960s, they were later superseded by air bleeds from jet engine compression stages.

== Technical considerations ==
Construction of a two-lobed cycloidal rotor. The red curve is an epicycloid and the blue curve is a hypocycloid. The smaller generating circles (red and blue) are one quarter the diameter of the larger generating circle (black). The rotor profile is the thick line.

A three-lobed Roots blower (Open animation)

The simplest form of a Roots blower has cycloidal rotors, constructed of alternating tangential sections of hypocycloidal and epicycloidal curves. For a two-lobed rotor, the smaller generating circles are one-quarter the diameter of the larger. Real Roots blowers may have more complex profiles for increased efficiency. The lobes on one rotor will not drive the other rotor with minimal free play in all positions, so that a separate pair of gears provide the phasing of the lobes.

Because rotary lobe pumps need to maintain a clearance between the lobes, a single stage Roots blower can pump gas across only a limited pressure differential. If the pump is used beyond its specification, the compression of the gas generates enough heat so that the lobes expand to the point that they jam, damaging the pump.

Roots pumps are capable of pumping large volumes but, as they only achieve moderate compression, it is not uncommon to see multiple Roots blower stages, frequently with heat exchangers (intercoolers) in between to cool the gas. The lack of oil on the pumping surfaces allows the pumps to work in environments where contamination control is important. The high pumping rate for hydrocarbons allows the Roots pump to provide an effective isolation between oiled pumps, such as rotary compression pumps, and the vacuum chamber.

A variant uses claw-shaped rotors for higher compression.

== Roots efficiency map ==
The Roots-type blower may achieve an efficiency of approximately 70% while achieving a maximum pressure ratio of two. Higher pressure ratios are achievable but at decreasing efficiency. Because a Roots-type blower pumps air in discrete pulses (unlike a screw compressor), pulsation noise and turbulence may be transmitted downstream. If not properly managed (through outlet piping geometry) or accounted for (by structural reinforcement of downstream components), the resulting pulsations can cause fluid cavitation and/or damage to components downstream of the blower.

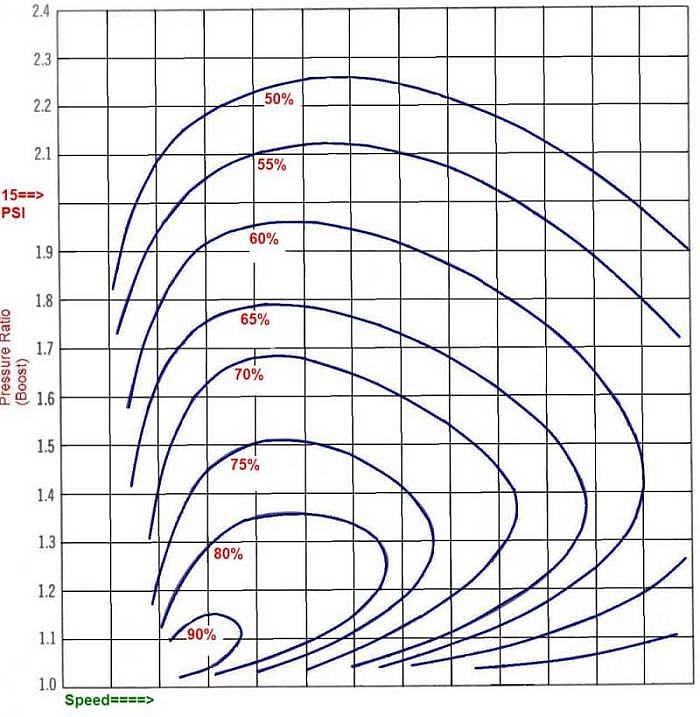
Roots supercharger efficiency map. Generalized blower efficiency map shows how a blower's efficiency varies with speed and boost.

For any given Roots blower running under given conditions, a single point will fall on the map. This point will rise with increasing boost and will move to the right with increasing blower speed. It can be seen that, at moderate speed and low boost, the efficiency can be over 90%. This is the area in which Roots blowers were originally intended to operate, and they are very good at it.

Boost is given in terms of pressure ratio, which is the ratio of absolute air pressure before the blower to the absolute air pressure after compression by the blower. If no boost is present, the pressure ratio will be 1.0 (meaning 1:1), as the outlet pressure equals the inlet pressure. 15psi boost is marked for reference (slightly above a pressure ratio of 2.0 compared to atmospheric pressure). At 15 psi (100 kPa) boost, Roots blowers hover between 50% and 58%. Replacing a smaller blower with a larger blower moves the point to the left. In most cases, as the map shows, this will move it into higher efficiency areas on the left as the smaller blower likely will have been running fast on the right of the chart. Usually, using a larger blower and running it slower to achieve the same boost will give an increase in compressor efficiency.

The volumetric efficiency of the Roots-type blower is very good, usually staying above 90% at all but the lowest blower speeds. Because of that, a blower running at low efficiency will still mechanically deliver the intended volume of air to the engine, but that air will be hotter. In drag racing applications, where large volumes of fuel are injected with that hot air, vaporizing the fuel absorbs the heat. That functions as a kind of liquid aftercooler system and goes a long way to negating the inefficiency of the Roots design in that application.

== Comparative advantages ==
Rotary lobe blowers, commonly called boosters in high vacuum application, are not used as a stand-alone pump. In high vacuum applications, the boosters' pumping speed can be used towards reducing the end pressure and increasing the pumping speed.

Fans With a low increase in pressure, fans are commonly used to move substantial quantities of gas. They're typically employed for the circulation of air in buildings, machine ventilation, cooling equipment and other industrial applications.

Blowers Blowers are capable of creating medium air flow with moderate pressure levels. They are used in applications where the pressure need is higher than fans.

Compressors Compressors generate higher air pressures in industrial applications generally between 8 and 12 bars with less amount of air flow rates.

== Related terms ==
The term "blower" is commonly used to define a device placed on engines with a functional need for additional airflow using a direct mechanical link as its energy source. The term blower is used to describe different types of superchargers. A screw type supercharger, Roots-type supercharger, and a centrifugal supercharger are all types of what are commonly described as blowers, however there is a distinction between a roots type supercharger which is a positive displacement pump "blower" with no internal volume reduction/pressure increase, and other types of supercharger such as the eccentric vane powerplus and the Eaton axial flow which have internal compression and are more correctly described as superchargers.

Conversely, a turbocharger, using exhaust compression to spin its turbine, and not a direct mechanical link, is not generally regarded as a "blower" but simply a "turbo".

== See also ==
- Drag racing, where Roots-type superchargers are used for T/F top fuel dragsters, F/C Fuel Coupe funny car each using nitro-methane fuel and T/AD dragsters and TA/FC funny cars using alcohol fuel and Pro Modified using methanol fuel in professional drag racing classes
