= Jarir =

Jarir may refer to:

- Jarir (poet), Arab poet
- Jarir Bookstore, a Saudi company specializing in office retailing and book publishing.
- Jarir Street, a street in Riyadh
- Jarir, a neighborhood in Riyadh
- an alternative name for the Somali Bantu
