= Jarir (Riyadh) =

Jarir حي جرير
- Neighbourhood
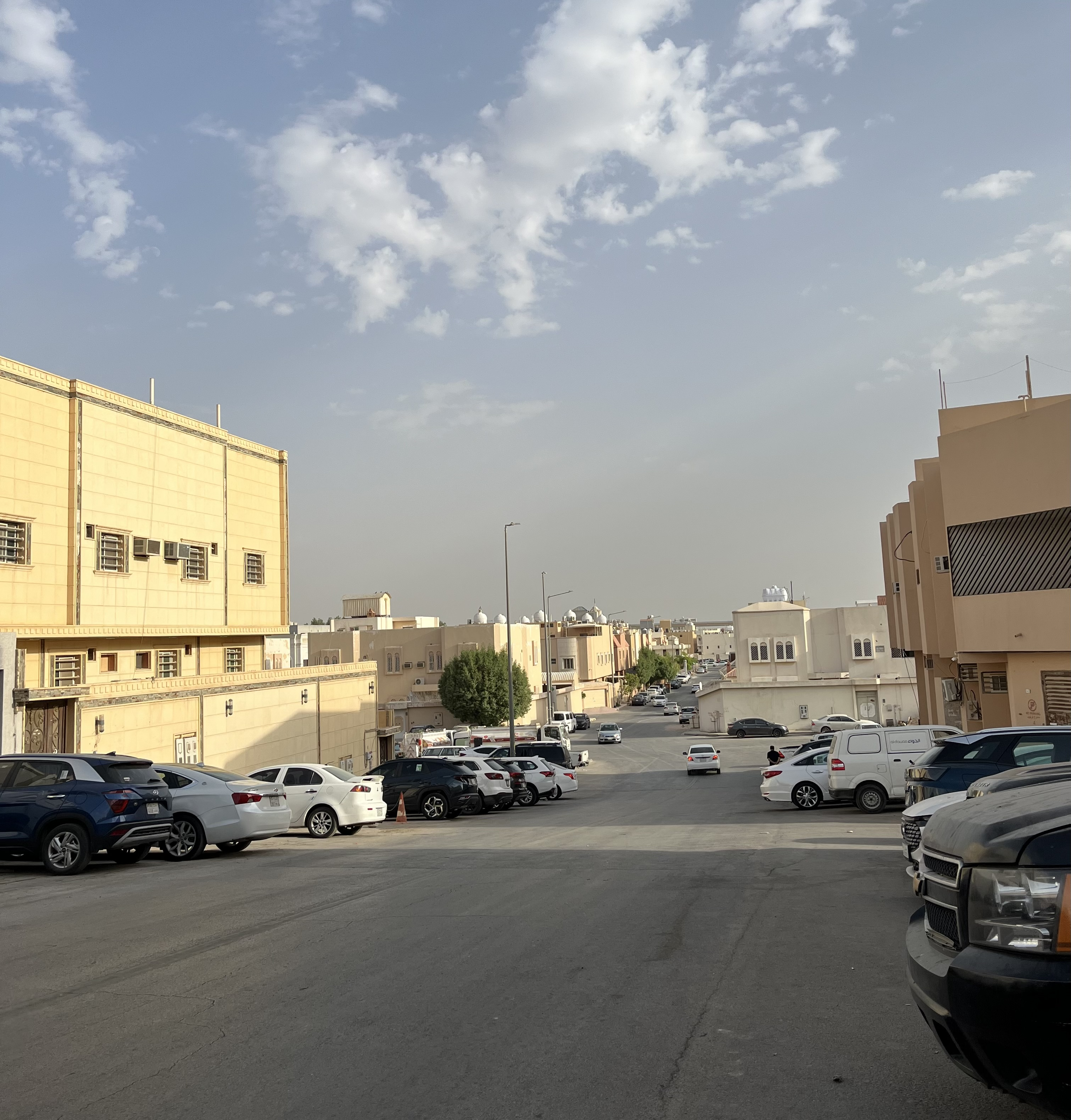
- Jarir, 2024
- Interactive map of Jarir
- Coordinates: 24°40′38″N 46°45′1″E
- Country: Saudi Arabia
- City: Riyadh
- Named for: Jarir ibn Atiyah

Government
  - Body: Baladiyah Al Batha

Language
  - Official: Arabic

Jarir (Arabic: جرير) or Jareer is an affluent residential neighborhood in Riyadh, Saudi Arabia, located west of al-Rabwah and east of al-Malaz in the sub-municipality of al-Malaz. The district is named after Umayyad-era Arab poet Jarir ibn Atiyah and emerged during the urbanization of Riyadh between the 1950s and 1970s.

Jarir is a residential district in central Riyadh, Saudi Arabia, The neighborhood's origins can be traced back to the period 1958–1959 when the Jarir Street was built, which was named after Jarir ibn Atiyah. It hosts a number of private villas and is considered to be one of the most affluent neighborhoods of the city.
