= Al Faruq (Riyadh) =

Al-Faruq حي الفاروق
- Neighbourhood
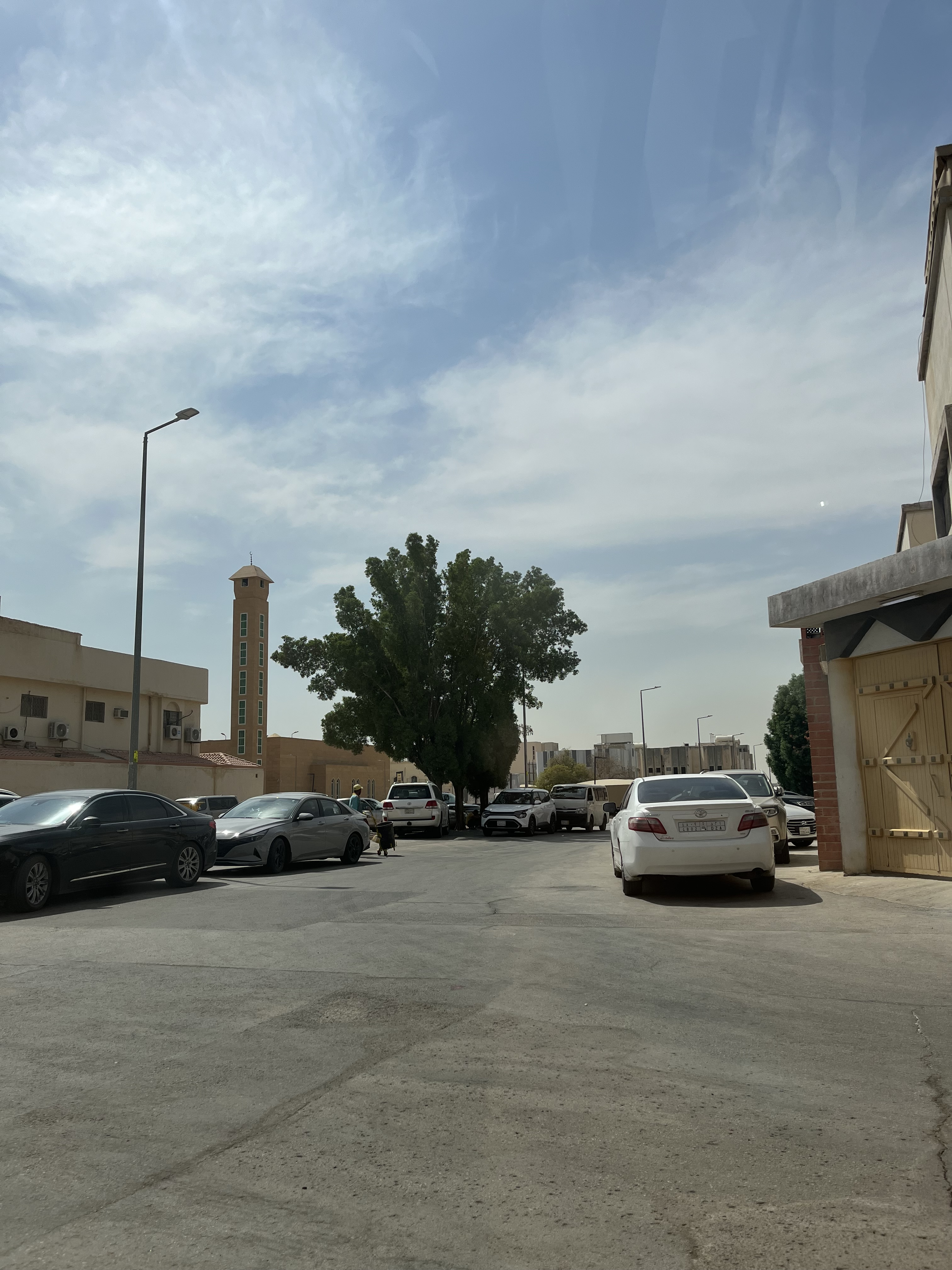
- Al Faruq, 2024
- Interactive map of Al-Faruq
- Coordinates: 24°39′13″N 46°46′23″E
- Country: Saudi Arabia
- City: Riyadh

Government
  - Body: Al Malaz Sub-Municipality

Language
  - Official: Arabic

Al-Faruq (Arabic: الفاروق, lit. 'the distinguisher') is a neighborhood in Riyadh, Saudi Arabia, located north of al-Faisaliah and south of al-Safa in the sub-municipality of al-Malaz. It is named after al-Farooq. The district contains the Rimal Center, a Saudi Electricity Company Office, Dragon World, eXtra, SACO, IKEA and Panda outlets.

== Overview ==
Al Farouq is located adjacent to Exit 16. It is located north of al-Faisiliah, east of as-Sinaiyah, south of al-Safa and west of al-Jazirah neighborhoods.

The district is bordered by Eastern Ring Road to the east, Omar Ibn Al Khattab Road to the north, Ali ibn Abi Talib Road to the west and Al Madinah Al Munawarrah Road to the south.
