= King Fahd Mosque (Riyadh) =

Sunni mosque in Riyadh, Suadi Arabia

- Arabic: جامع الملك فهد
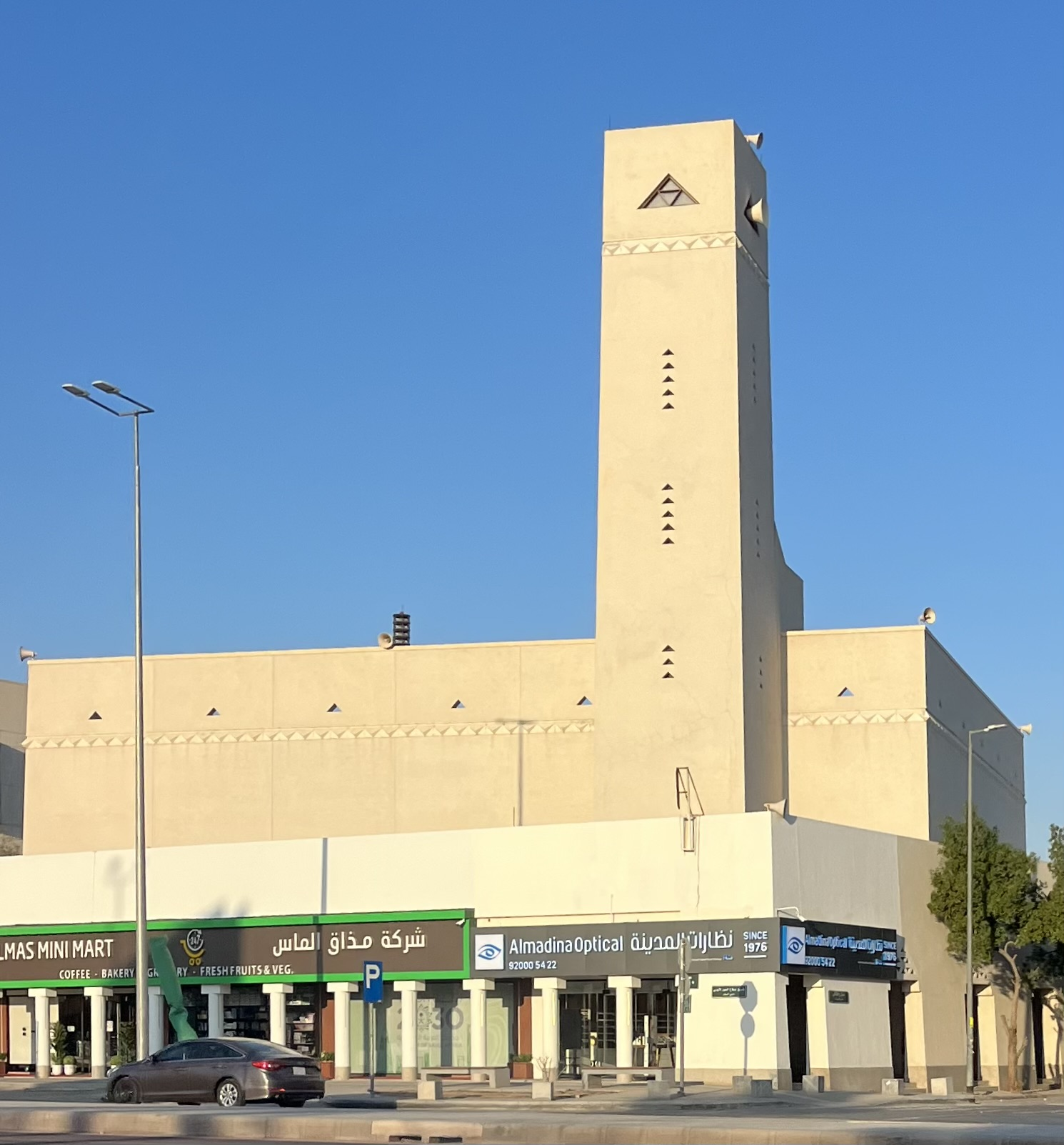
- The mosque, in 2024

- Location of the mosque in Saudi Arabia

Religion
- Affiliation: Sunni Islam
- Ecclesiastical or organizational status: Friday mosque
- Status: Active

Location
- Location: Al Malaz, Riyadh
- Country: Saudi Arabia
- Interactive map of King Fahd Mosque
- Administration: King Fahad Foundation
- Coordinates: 24°37′39″N 46°42′44″E

Architecture
- Type: Mosque architecture
- Style: Modern Najdi
- Founder: Fahd bin Abdulaziz
- General contractor: Royal Commission for Riyadh City
- Completed: 1993

Specifications
- Capacity: 2,000 worshippers
- Minaret: 1
- Site area: 0.97 ha (2.4 acres)

The King Fahd Mosque (Arabic: جامع الملك فهد) is a Sunni Islam Friday mosque, located in the al-Malaz neighborhood of Riyadh, Saudi Arabia. It was built in 1993 by the Royal Commission for Riyadh City and personally funded by King Fahd bin Abdulaziz.

== History ==
The mosque was built in 1993 by the Royal Commission for Riyadh City and is named after King Fahd bin Abdulaziz, who primarily funded the mosque's construction. Incorporating elements of Najdi architecture, the mosque is a recipient of the Symposiume on Mosque Architecture Award by King Saud University.

The mosque is full on religious holidays like Eid al-Fitr and Eid al-Adha for Salat al-Eid.

The mosque covers an area of almost 0.97 ha (2.4 acres) and can accommodate approximately 2,000 worshippers. It also has a separate prayer hall for women.

The mosque was restored in March 2024 on the directives of Prince Muhammad bin Fahd Al Saud, the former governor of Eastern Province and the chairman of King Fahad Foundation.

== Gallery ==
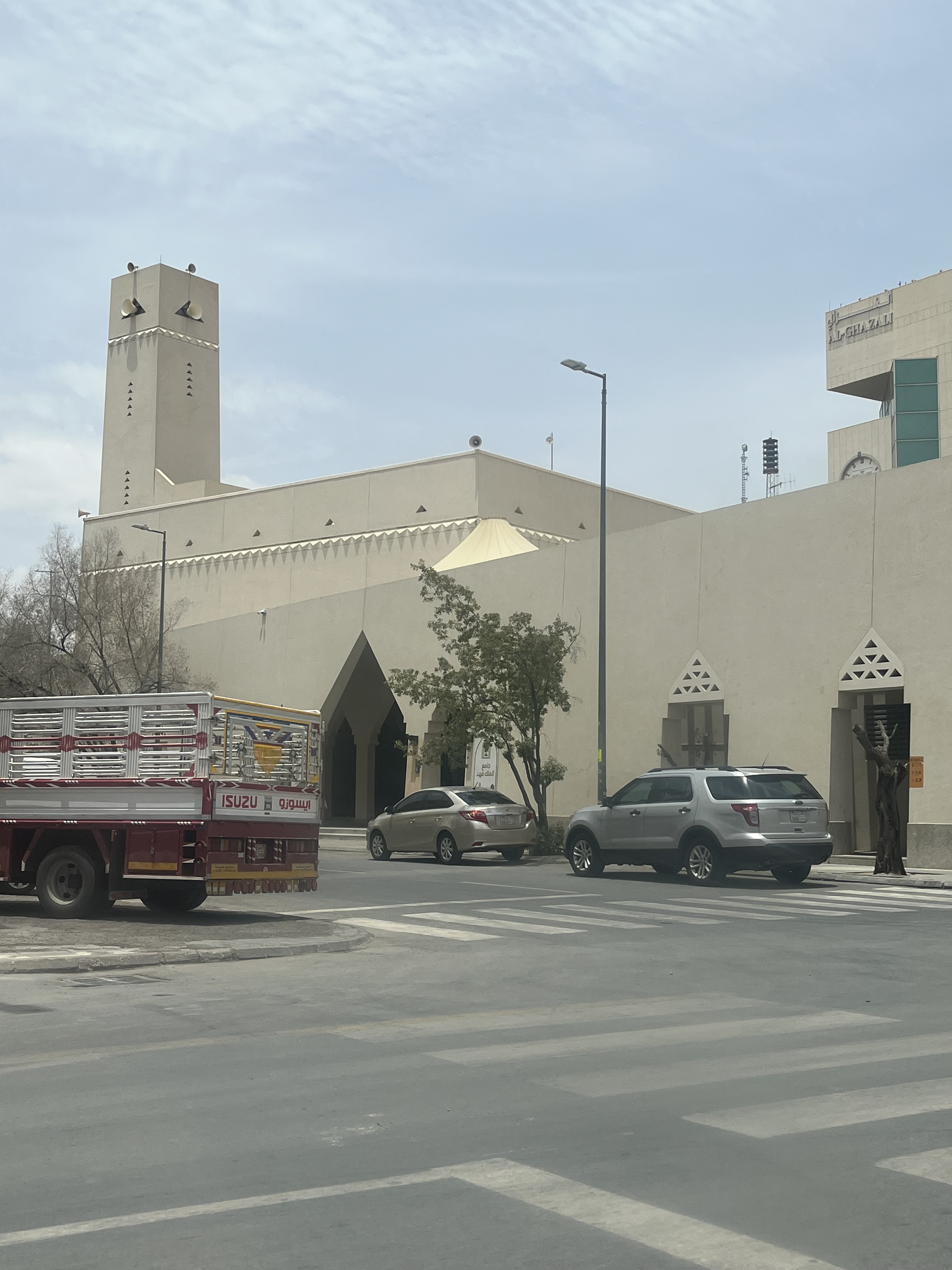
The mosque in August 2024

== See also ==
- Islam in Saudi Arabia
- List of mosques in Saudi Arabia
- List of things named after Saudi kings
