= King Abdullah Park =

Public park in Riyadh, Saudi Arabia

King Abdullah Malaz Park
- ﻣﻨﺘﺰﻩ ﺍﻟﻤﻠﻚ ﻋﺒﺪﺍﷲ
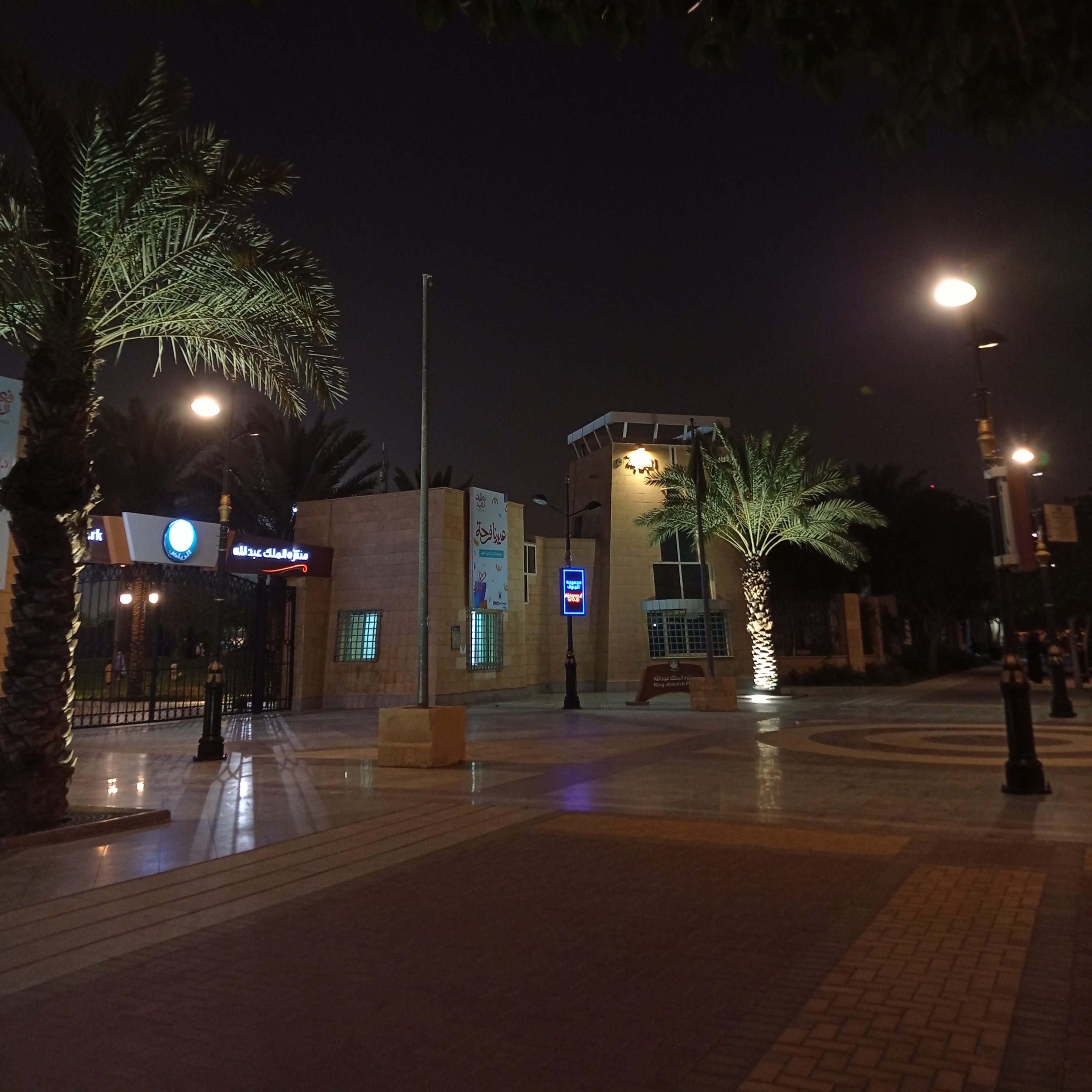
- King Abdullah Park, May 2023
- Interactive map of King Abdullah Malaz Park
- Location: al-Malazz, Riyadh, Saudi Arabia
- Coordinates: 24°39′59″N 46°44′13″E
- Area: 31.8 hectares (79 acres)
- Opened: 2 October 2013; 13 years ago
- Founder: Abdullah bin Abdulaziz
- Designer: Rawabi Fayfa for Agriculture and Contracting Company
- Budget: 125,051,000 (SAR); 33,342,300 (USD)

King Abdullah Park (Arabic: ﻣﻨﺘﺰﻩ ﺍﻟﻤﻠﻚ ﻋﺒﺪﺍﷲ, romanized: Muntazah al-Malik ʿAbd Allāh), formerly Al-Malaz Square (Arabic: ميدان الملز), is an equestrian field-turned municipal park in the al-Malazz neighborhood of Riyadh, Saudi Arabia, located adjacent to Prince Faisal bin Fahd Stadium. Covering an area of 31.8 hectares (79 acres), the square served as a horse racecourse from the early 20th century until 2002, before being reopened as the largest public park in the country in 2013. Al-Malaz Square, as it was previously called, lent its name to the al-Malazz neighbourhood, which the park today forms a central part of.

Popular for its 12-meter wide pedestrian corridor, 110-meter giant laser fountains and an artificial lake, the park gets flooded by visitors during festive seasons of Eid al-Fitr, Eid al-Adha and publicly organized events such as the Saudi National Day where the park also displays fireworks before midnight.

== History ==
=== Al Malaz Square ===
In the early 20th century, the square held horse racing events for King Abdulaziz ibn Saud, which happened to be his favorite sport. The name was derived from word laz (Arabic: لز), which loosely translates to 'running fast in a race. The locality surrounding it eventually got identified as 'Al Malaz', named after the square. After the ascension of King Saud in 1953, he initiated the relocation of government ministries from Jeddah to Riyadh and launched a housing project for the employees, thereby turning the area into an urban neighborhood between 1953 and 1957 and gradually making it hard for the sustainability of horse racing.

In 1965, with King Faisal's assent, Prince Abdullah and Prince Salman pushed for the establishment of the Equestrian Club in the square. Prince Salman instructed the Ministry of Labor and Social Affairs to issue a resolution for the establishment of the jockey club which was followed by a royal decree from King Faisal that handed over the club's presidency to Prince Abdullah. The square was also a popular destination for several foreign dignitaries and head of states between 1968 and 2002, including Queen Elizabeth II, Giovanni Leone, Indira Gandhi, Qaboos bin Said, Valéry d'Estaing, etc.

By the fall 1990s, al-Malaz had become a bustling commercial and residential neighborhood, which made it difficult for the square to host horse racing. In 1997, Crown Prince Abdullah instructed plans to relocate the Equestrian Club to the outskirts of Riyadh and intended the square to be turned into a public park and its preparation neared in 2001.

=== King Abdullah Park ===
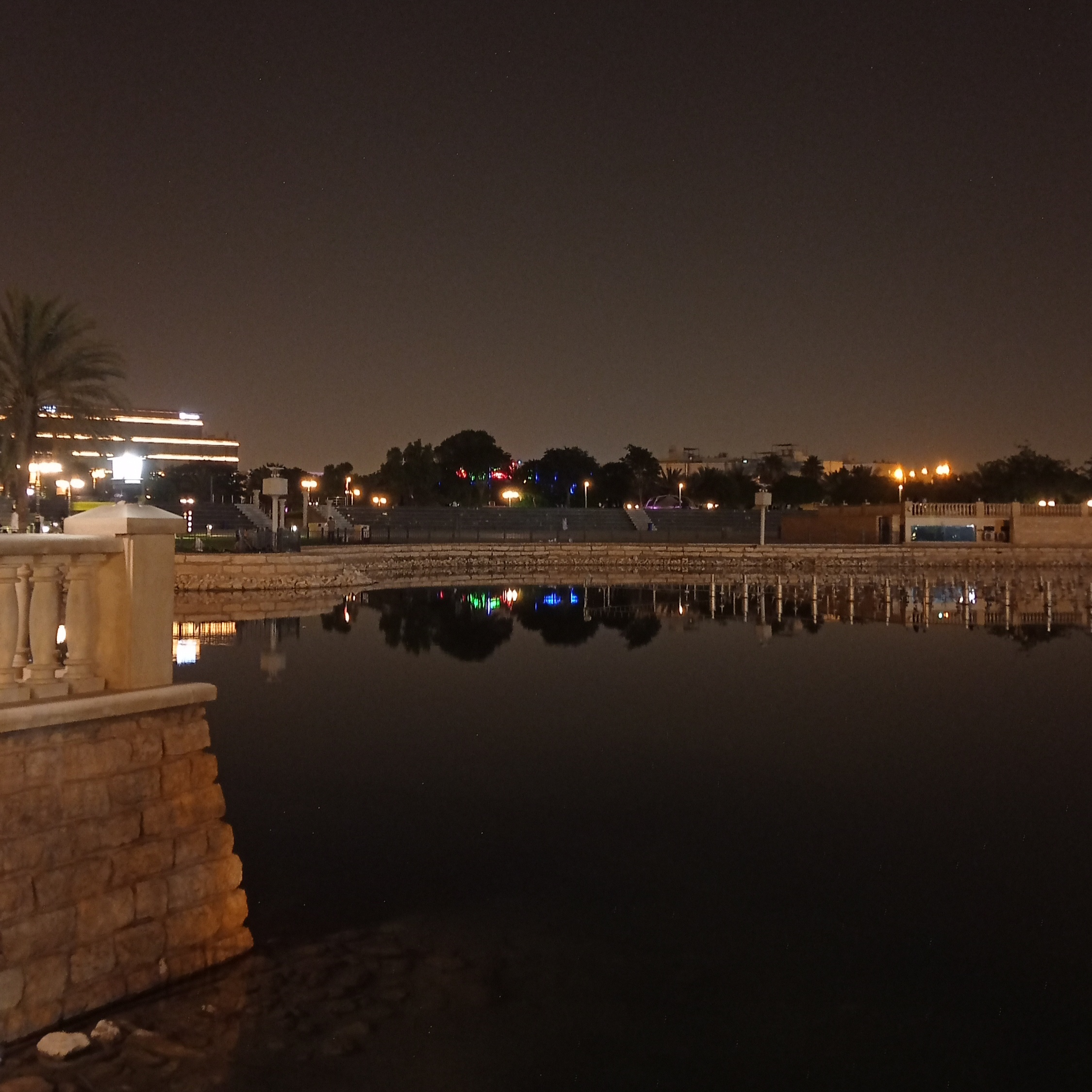
The artificial lake, 2022

The park in 2022

In 2003, Al Malaz Square was handed over to the Riyadh Municipality and it was announced that it would be soon turned into a public park.

In February 2010, the three-year project of the construction of the park was signed by Prince Salman, the 11th Governor of Riyadh at the time with Rawabi Fayfa for Agriculture and Contracting Company. The project was later monitored by his successor, Prince Sattam bin Abdulaziz al-Saud until his death in February 2013.

=== Inauguration ===
King Abdullah Park, 2022

The inauguration of the park took place on October 2, 2013 by Prince Khalid bin Bandar al-Saud and Prince Turki bin Abdullah bin Abdulaziz al-Saud, the Governor and Deputy Governor of Riyadh respectively. The inauguration was attended by several high-ranking Saudi officials and foreign diplomats as well.

King Abdullah Park is a gift from Custodian of the Two Holy Mosques King Abdullah when he promised to provide the racecourse with added incentive to the residents of Riyadh.

— Prince Khalid bin Bandar al-Saud, 02 October 2013
