= Ad Dhubbat =

Al Dhubbat الضباط
- Neighbourhood
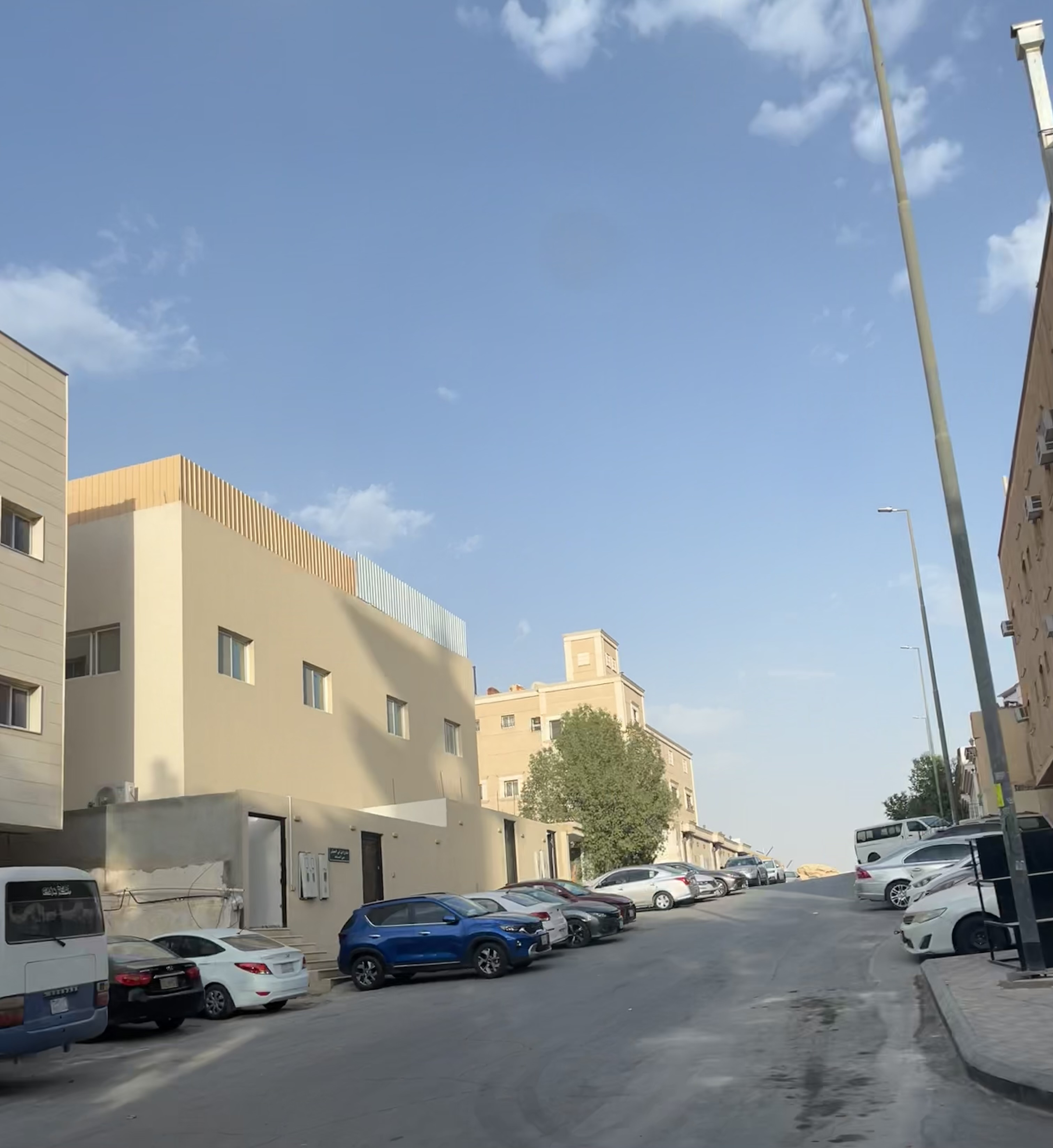
- Al Dhubbat, 2024
- Interactive map of Al Dhubbat
- Coordinates: 24°40′47″N 46°43′23″E
- Country: Saudi Arabia
- City: Riyadh
- Region: Old Riyadh
- Named for: Employees of Ministry of Defense

Government
  - Body: Al Malaz Sub-Municipality

Language
  - Official: Arabic

Al-Dhubbat (Arabic: الضباط, lit. 'the officers') is a neighborhood in Riyadh, Saudi Arabia, located east of al-Wizarat and northwest of al-Malaz in the sub-municipality of al-Malaz. It is one of the most ancient neighborhoods of Riyadh, dating back to the time of Jabal Abu Makhruq. The current form of the neighborhood emerged in the 1970s as a housing development project for government officials employed in the Ministry of Defense and other agencies. The district later got named after them.

== Overview ==
Jabal Abu Makhruq is the oldest landmark in the district, a limestone hill that once served as a stopover for pilgrims arriving from Eastern Arabia enroute to the walled town of Riyadh in medieval era. In the 1970s, the Saudi government developed the surrounding area of the limestone hill alongside the al-Wizarat district as a housing development project for government officials employed in the Ministry of Defense and other agencies located along the Old Airport Road, and named it after them.
