= Abqaiq =

Abqaiq بقيق
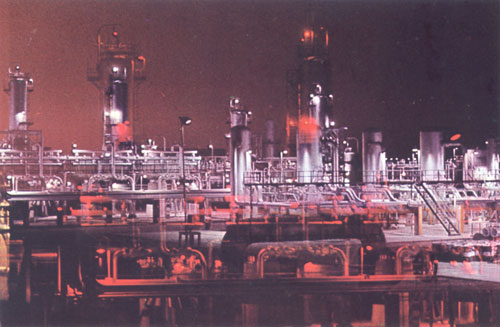
- Abqaiq at night

- Location within Saudi Arabia
- Coordinates: 25°56′06″N 49°39′58″E
- Country: Saudi Arabia
- Province: Eastern Province
- Established: 1940

Government
  - Provincial Governor: Saud bin Nayef Al Saud

Population (2022 census)
  - City: 45,032
  - Metro: 64,632 (Abqaiq governorate)
- Time zone: UTC+3
  - Summer (DST): UTC+3
- Postal Code: (5 digits)
- Area code: +966-13
- Website: Official website

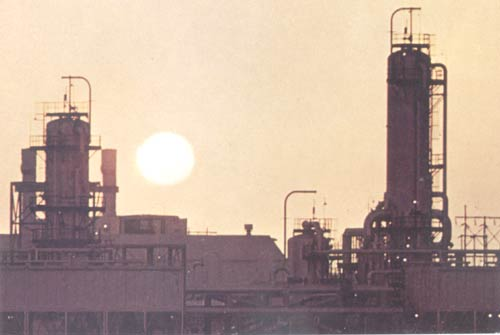

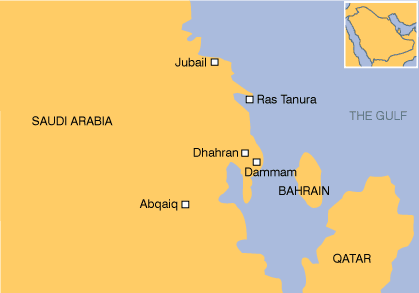
Map of Abqaiq Region

Abqaiq (Arabic: بقيق, romanized: Biqayq) is a city in the Eastern Province of Saudi Arabia, located in the desert 60 km southwest of the Dhahran-Dammam-Khobar metropolitan area, and north of the Rub' al-Khali, the second largest sand desert in the world also known as the "Empty Quarter".

Notably, it is home to a residential community for Saudi Aramco employees and their families. The Abqaiq Saudi Aramco residential community had a population of approximately 1,500 in 2012. Inclusion of the population outside the Saudi Aramco community brings this number closer to 45,000 (2022 census).

Abqaiq has organized a Safari Festival since 2017. The 10-day festival aims at presenting the Arab and desert heritage by presenting different shows.

== History ==
Abqaiq's rapid development and growth followed the discovery of the Abqaiq oil field in 1940 by Saudi Aramco.

== Terrorism and security ==
Abqaiq was the site of a terrorist attack attempt by al-Qaeda on 24 February 2006, targeting the oil processing facility. The 250-hectare complex can process 7 million barrels of oil a day. According to Ali Al-Naimi, "One of the cars exploded at the outer perimeter gate after guards fired on it. The second car made it through the first gate but also exploded under fire in a parking area. Both of the terrorists were killed." News of the attack pushed oil prices up by 2 dollars. The damage, however, was immediately contained by Saudi Aramco. According to Khalid R. al-Rodhan of the Center for Strategic and International Studies, "even if some of the facilities were destroyed, Saudi Aramco has claimed that it has backup and redundant facilities to produce at near capacity". In a report about the incident, he concludes that "the attack against Abqaiq should not be seen as a turning point in either Saudi stability or the global energy market. Rather, it is evidence that al-Qaeda and other extremists groups will stop at nothing to disturb the global economy and international peace. It also signals that al-Qaeda is changing tactics to attack an area that will garner most attention and inflict most damage on the Saudi leadership, the U.S., and the international community."

However, a moderate to severe attack on Abqaiq would slow production from an average of 6.8 million barrels (1,080,000 m^{3}) a day to 1 million barrels (160,000 m^{3}). The chief purpose of Abqaiq is to remove hydrogen sulfide from crude oil and reduce the vapor pressure, making the crude safe to be shipped in tankers. Abqaiq is the world's largest facility for this stabilization.

On 14 September 2019 Abqaiq was attacked. The Houthis claimed responsibility, stating that they were retaliating for the Saudi Arabian-led intervention in Yemen. The United States government claimed that instead the attack may have originated in Iraq or Iran, stating that the impacts were consistent with an attack from that direction. No casualties were reported, and the damage cut Saudi Arabia's oil output by half, or 5% of the global oil supply.

On 27 July 2026, the Abqaiq oil processing facility was attacked once again during the 2026 Iran war. Causing a temporary suspension of the operations. The Houthis claimed responsibility for the attack.

== Transportation ==
=== Railways ===
Abqaiq is home to a station on the Dammam–Riyadh line of the Saudi Arabia Railways.

Services at Abqaiq station
- Preceding station	Saudi Arabia Railways	Following station
  Dammam Terminus	Dammam–Riyadh	Hofuf towards Riyadh

=== Airport ===
There is a small single strip airport in Abqaiq (Abqaiq Airport), operated by Saudi Aramco and not open for commercial air traffic. However, people utilize the nearby King Fahd International Airport in Dammam which is currently 90 km away from Abqaiq (new road project currently in progress to shorten the distance to 70 km). It also provides full international air service. Alternatively, Al-Ahsa International Airport is just 80 km from Abqaiq, but it offers limited international service.
