= Riyadh Zoo =

Public zoo in Riyadh, Saudi Arabia

- Date opened: 1957; 69 years ago
- Location: Al Ihsa, al-Malaz, Riyadh 12832, Saudi Arabia
- Land area: 55 acres
- No. of animals: 1,500+
- No. of species: 196+
- Memberships: Arabian Zoo and Aquarium Association
- Website: Official website

Riyadh Zoo (Arabic: حديقة الحيوانات بالرياض, romanized: Ḥadīqat al-Ḥaywānāt bi-Arriyāḍ, lit. 'the garden of animals in Riyadh'), formerly Riyadh Zoological Gardens and locally as Malaz Zoo, is a 55-acre zoo in the al-Malazz neighborhood of Riyadh, Saudi Arabia. Founded in 1957 as a private menagerie for King Saud bin Abdulalziz and the Saudi royal family, the zoo was opened to the public in 1987 and it's today home to more than 1,500 animals of around 196 different species, including endangered ones. It is the largest and one of the oldest zoos in Saudi Arabia.

== History ==
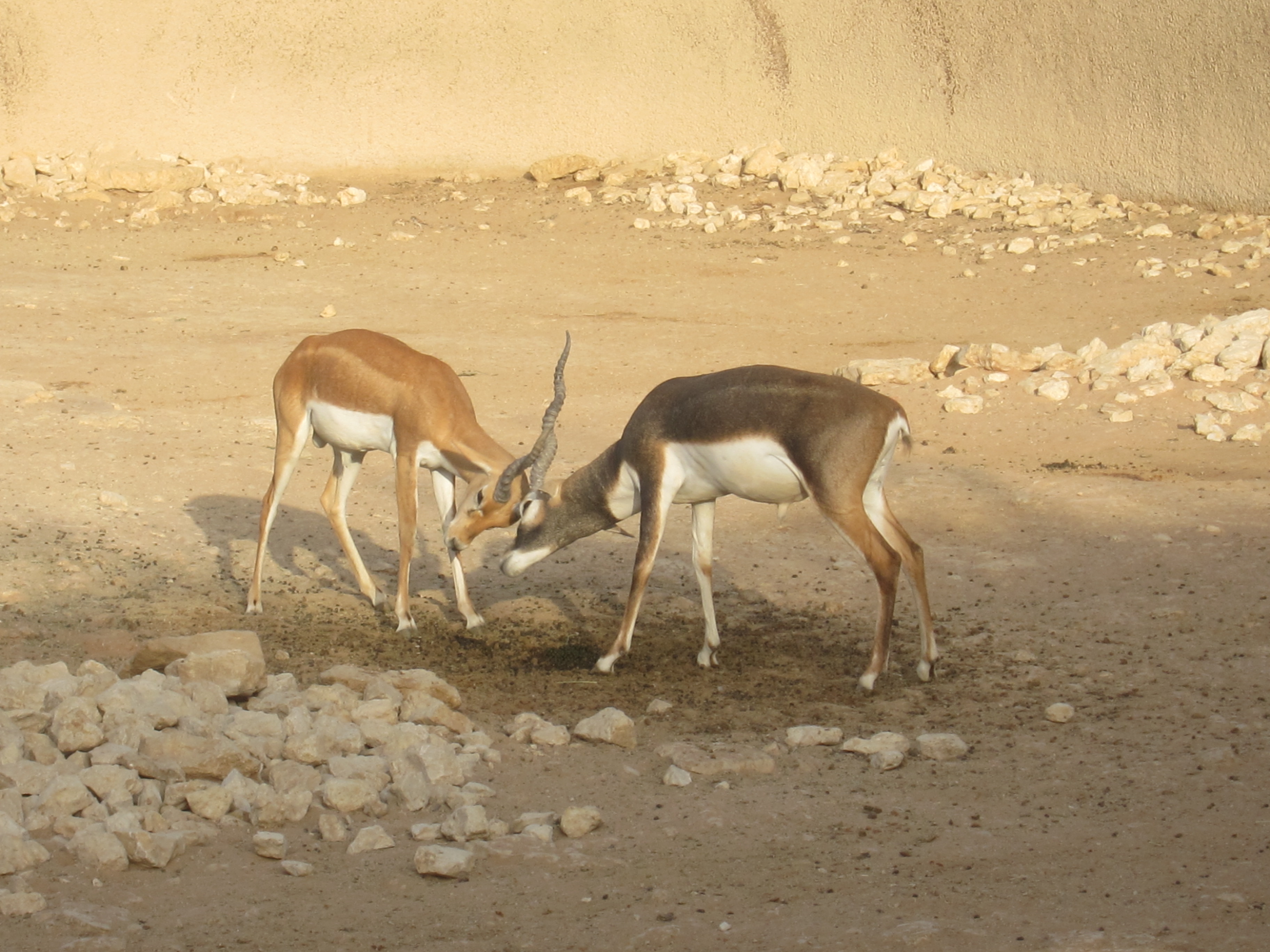
Two blackbucks locking horns on each other, 2014

Riyadh Zoo was set up by orders from King Saud bin Abdulaziz in 1957 as his private menagerie of exotic wild animals which he mostly received as gifts to the Saudi royal family. Most of the zoo's animals were originally kept at the palace grounds of Royal Nasiriyah Palace in al-Nasiriyah district of Riyadh as the menagerie was unable to handle the surging crowd of people which gathered to watch the animals whereas the menagerie in al-Malaz became the Riyadh Zoological Gardens. The structure of Riyadh Zoological Gardens was completely razed down in 1981 for the construction of a new public zoo six years later in 1987. The zoo was designed by London-based consultants Safari Parks International. After signing the Convention on International Trade in Endangered Species, by 1988, the zoo started receiving animals from countries like United States, Peru, Australia, Singapore, Kenya and Egypt. In reciprocation, Riyadh Zoo later dispatched two native sand cats to Cincinnati Zoo in Ohio, United States.

=== Decline and 2008 rehabilitation ===
Al Riyadh newspaper reported in 2007 that the zoo and the animals within are in miserable state and large-scale mismanagement by officials have led to a sharp decline in number of visitors. The case of the zoo was brought forward to the then Mayor of Riyadh, Prince Abdulaziz bin Ayyaf Muqrin al-Saud, who ordered an all-out rehabilitation of the zoo in 2008. For long visitors above the age of 12 were barred from entering the zoo, to this, a frustrated Saudi national published a column in the Al Eqtisadiah newspaper dated 21 June 2007 (6/22/1428 Hijri), in which he asked Riyadh Municipality to review the rule and allow family visitors into the premises of the zoo. The Saudi government accepted his request and subsequently issued directives in which the zoo was asked to allow family visitors. By 2009, the authorities successfully revived the zoo and saw 200% increase in visitors and couple of years later the zoo became one of the top tourist destinations to be visited by families and tourists.

=== Arabian Zoo and Aquarium Association ===
In December 2012, the Al Ain Zoo in Al Ain, United Arab Emirates hosted a meeting of setting up a regional association for zoos in Arab countries, the Arabian Zoo and Aquarium Association (AZAA) with the help from World Association of Zoos and Aquariums, the South Asian Zoo Association for Regional Cooperation, the African Association of Zoos and Aquaria and several delegations from the UAE, Qatar, Morocco, Saudi Arabia, Kuwait, Jordan and Bahrain as their member states, of which Riyadh Zoo was a participant.

=== Riyadh Season ===
Riyadh Season, an annual festival that takes place in Riyadh, included Riyadh Zoo as one of its 12 main zones in its 2022 and 2023 iterations.

== Animal exhibits ==
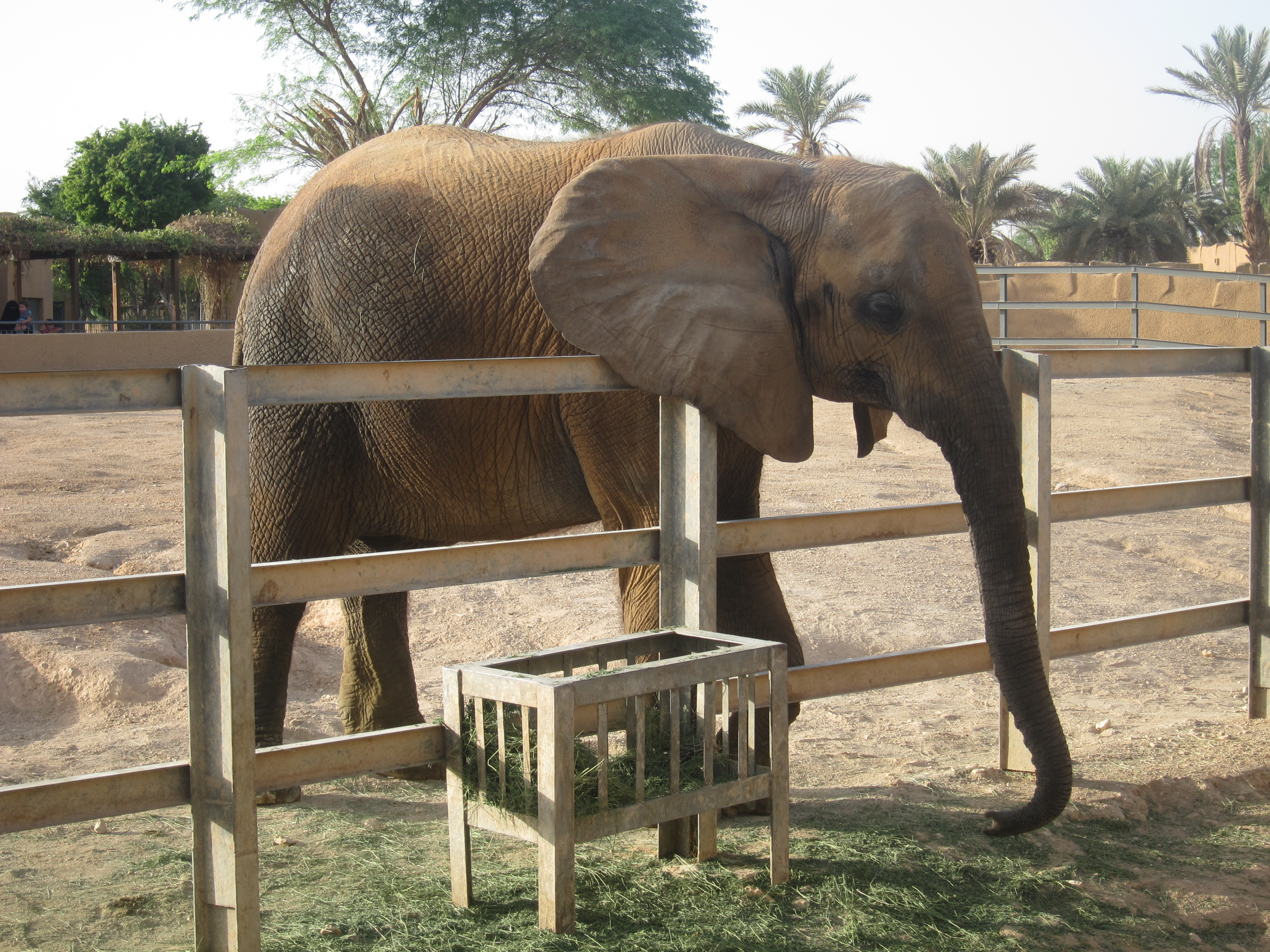
An african elephant found in the zoo in 2014.

The zoo exhibits around 1,500 exotic wildlife animals from around the world, including seals, kangaroos, griffon vultures, lesser whistling duck, pelicans, demoiselle cranes, storks, tortoises, grey crowned cranes, scarlet macaws, parrots, cockatoos, chukar partridge, pheasants, quails, common snipe, owls, bats, kangaroos, emu, wallabies, red pandas, marmosets, giraffes, common elands, springbok, blackbucks, zebras, tapirs, striped hyenas, African lions, cheetahs, jaguarundi, lemurs, baboons, colobus monkey, siamang, monkeys, orangutans, bonobos, brown bears, coyotes, honey badgers, deers, alpacas, blackbucks, southern white rhinoceros, pygmy hippopotamus, gazelles, arabian oryxs, topi antelopes, leopards, bobcats, sand cat, tigers, reptiles, crocodiles, sea lions, African elephants, greater flamingos, camels, pumas, and raccoons. The zoo also showcases endangered species of Saudi Arabia, like the houbara bustard bird Arabian desert leopard, Arabian oryx, etc. The zoo is locally popular for the train ride which gives a 20-minute tour of the entire zoo.

== 2019 royal Bengal tiger incident ==
On 21 December 2019, a 24-year old Sudanese national who came to the zoo as a visitor, threw himself into the enclosure of royal Bengal tigers at 10:30 (Arabian Standard Time) and was severely mauled by one of the female tigress. However, the zoo authorities were quick to act and drugged the tigress by firing narcotic shots at her. The injured visitor was later transferred to the King Saud Medical City by the Saudi Red Crescent Authority.
