= Al Faisaliyyah (Riyadh) =

Al-Faisaliyyah حي الفيصلية
- Neighbourhood
- Location within Saudi Arabia Location within Asia
- Coordinates: 24°38′3″N 46°46′51″E
- Country: Saudi Arabia
- City: Riyadh
- Named for: King Faisal ibn Abdulaziz

Government
  - Body: Baladiyah Al Batha

Language
  - Official: Arabic

Al-Faisaliyyah (Arabic: حي الفيصلية, romanized: ḥaī al-Faīṣalīyah), locally al-Ghalah (Arabic: الغالة) and pejoratively as al-Mamnūʿāt (Arabic: الممنوعات; lit. no-go zone), is a shanty neighborhood and a subject of Baladiyah al-Batha in south-east Riyadh, Saudi Arabia, inhabited mainly by lower-class Afro-Arabs besides having significant presence of Yemenis, Indians, Filipinos and Bangladeshis. Bordered by Southern Ring Road to the south and Eastern Ring Road to the east, it shares proximity with as-Sinaiyah and al-Khalidiyyah neighborhoods to the west and al-Faruq neighborhood to the north.

== History ==
Al-Faisaliyyah derives its name from King Faisal ibn Abdulaziz. Owing to its ostracized and uninhabited atmosphere, it was previously called 'al-Ghalah' (Arabic: الغالة), which basically translates to 'something which is cut-off from the sea'. According to a 2004 article by Al Riyadh, the area was gifted by King Faisal to homeless undocumented African migrants who used to live in al-Malazz and al-Maizilah neighborhoods (behind King Fahd International Stadium).

== Unemployment and security ==
Al-Faisaliyyah is one of the most crime-infested areas of Riyadh and has been dubbed by locals as 'al-Mamnūʿāt' (Arabic: الممنوعات; lit. no-go zone), and has one of the highest unemployment ratios in the capital. According to Asharq Al-Awsat in 2007, almost sixty percent of the residents living in were undocumented.
