= Al Rabwah (Riyadh) =

Al Rabwah حي الربوة
- Neighbourhood
- Former villa campus of Yara International School, 2019

- Location within Saudi Arabia Location within Asia
- Coordinates: 24°41′34″N 46°45′15″E
- Country: Saudi Arabia
- City: Riyadh

Government
  - Body: Baladiyah Al Malaz

Language
  - Official: Arabic

Al Rabwah (Arabic: الربوة, romanized: al-rabwah, lit. 'the hillock neighborhood'), pronounced as ar-Rabwah, is a residential neighborhood in eastern Riyadh, Saudi Arabia, located north of Jarir and east of al-Zahra in the sub-municipality of al-Malaz. The locality is popular for its commercial landmarks such as Othaim Mall Alinma Bank, Jarir Bookstore along with urban parks such as al-Nahda Park and Rabwah Park.

The district is served by the Riyadh Bus network, including routes 150 and 950.
