= Thulaim Palace =

Former smallpox quarantine center in Riyadh, Saudi Arabia

- قصر ثليم
- Interactive map of the Thulaim Palace area
- Alternative names: Thulaim Guesthouse

General information
- Location: al-Futah, Riyadh, Saudi Arabia
- Coordinates: 24.63878°N 46.71696°E
- Construction started: 1936
- Construction stopped: 1939

Technical details
- Floor count: 2
- Floor area: 5,971 square metres (1.475 acres)

Other information
- Number of rooms: 50+

Thulaim Palace (Arabic: قصر ثليم) or Thulaim Guesthouse (Arabic: مضيف ثليم), is a double-storey multipurpose historic building in the easternmost extreme of al-Futah, Riyadh, Saudi Arabia, located next to the Batʼha Commercial Center. It once served as one of the quarantine facilities for treating patients during the smallpox epidemic of the 1940s. Built between 1936 and 1939 by King Abdulaziz ibn Saud on a farm with the same name situated on the edge of Wadi al-Batha in the northeastern fringes of the old city walls, it overlooks the eponymous neighborhood of Thulaim which itself got named after the compound.

== Overview and background ==
In 1936, King Abdulaziz purchased a farm called Thulaim, that was located on the northeastern outskirts of the walled town of Riyadh to build a public guesthouse endowed for his father, Abdul Rahman bin Faisal Al Saud. Initially, the building intended to function as a stopover for travelers coming to Riyadh to meet Abdulaziz and tribal nomads who watered their livestock through a large seven column basin situated in close proximity to it, known as Madi, which is today the site for the Midi Mosque in the National Museum Park. However, as the smallpox epidemic gripped Arabia in the early 1940s, the building was quickly transformed into a quarantine center and underwent expansion to primarily serve infected patients.
