= Dammam railway station =

Railway station in Saudi Arabia

Dammam Railway Station محطة قطار الدمام
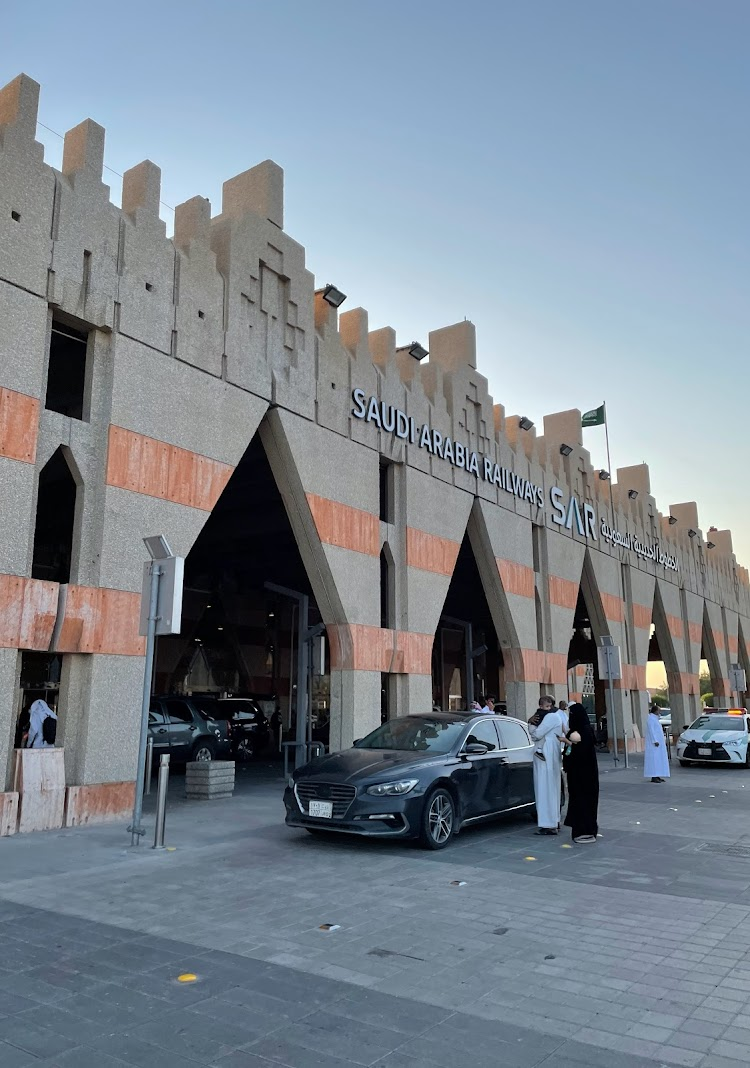
- Entrance to the station

General information
- Location: Fatema Al Zahra St. Abdullah Fouad Dist. Dammam 32235; Eastern Province; Saudi Arabia
- Coordinates: 26.4101°N 50.1265°E
- System: Regional Rail
- Owner: Saudi Railway Company
- Line: Dammam–Riyadh Line
- Tracks: 6
- Train operators: Saudi Railway Company
- Connections: Dammam-Riyadh Line 1: Buqayq; Hofuf; Riyadh; Dammam-Riyadh Line 2: Buqayq; Hofuf; Haradh; Kharj Riyadh

Construction
- Parking: Yes
- Accessible: Yes
- Architect: Lucio Barbera
- Architectural style: Mediterranean Najdi Islamic

Other information
- Station code: DMM
- Website: https://www.sar.com.sa/

History
- Opened: 1981

Services
Preceding station	Saudi Arabia Railways	Following station
Terminus	Dammam–Riyadh	Abqaiq towards Riyadh
Location

Dammam Station (Arabic: محطة الدمام, romanized: Maḥatṭat Dammam) is the railway station serving the city of Dammam. It is the eastern terminus of the Dammam–Riyadh line and one of the three railway stations with active passenger transport in the Eastern Province. The station also serves as the station of operations for the Saudi Railway Company (SAR).

== History ==
The current station building was designed by Italian architect Lucio Barbera in 1978, and was opened to the public in 1981. The design was inspired by the architecture of mosques along the Mediterranean Sea. The building constitutes the main lobby and the east and west wings, which enclose the two railway platforms. The roof is made from prefabricated, pre-stressed beams and he exterior is clad in limestone which was sourced locally.

The style and decoration of the building uses elements such as triangular openings to construct windows and arcades and parapets with rectangular steps, elements bearing a resemblance to Nejdi architecture but also common in other Arab and Islamic architecture. The station includes a main concourse, ticket counter, and the two platforms. The stations in Dammam, Hofuf and Riyadh were all designed by Barbera and share similar design.

== Services ==
The first railway line built under the Kingdom of Saudi Arabia began construction between Dammam and Riyadh in 1947. The line was inaugurated on October 20, 1951 and was 569 km (354 mi) long. Initially owned and operated by Saudi Aramco, the ownership and operations were later entrusted to the Saudi Arabian Ministry of Finance. On May 13, 1966, the Saudi Railways Organization (SRO) came into existence after the issuance of a royal decree which declared it a public corporation with full legal status. And on February 18, 2021, the Saudi Railways Organization was officially merged with the Saudi Railway Company (SAR). The main railway station buildings with active passenger service opened in Riyadh, Dammam, and Hofuf in 1981.

The present passenger railway line (Dammam-Riyadh Railway Line 1) from Riyadh to Dammam via Buqayq and Hofuf, measuring 449 km (279 mi), was completed in 1985. Along with the decrease in distance, this shortened the time taken for the journey between the two cities from 7 hours to 5 hours. SRO trains on this route travel at around 180 km/h (113 mph). The line was used by approximately 1.48 million passengers during 2017 between stations in Dammam, Abqaiq, Hofuf, and Riyadh.

This other line (Dammam-Riyadh Railway Line 2) is restricted to transport of freight and cargo. For the first 139 km (86 mi) of its length, it uses the same line as the passenger line, but where the passenger line bends westward toward Riyadh at Hofuf, the freight line continues straight toward Haradh and then bends northward toward Riyadh via Kharj.

The station hosts a number of services including a mosque, a café, a business lounge, a Sixt car rental office, an Uber and a Careem office.

== Future Projects ==
The Saudi Landbridge Project is a proposed plan to extend the existing Dammam–Riyadh line to Jeddah via New Muwayh.

Dammam will serve as a major junction on the proposed Gulf Railway line as the station is the proposed junction between the main line from Kuwait to the United Arab Emirates and a feeder line from Dammam to Bahrain.

== See also ==
- List of railway stations in Saudi Arabia
