= Al Yamamah Hotel =

Hotel in Riyadh, Saudi Arabia

- فندق اليمامة
- Interactive map of the Al Yamamah Hotel area

General information
- Location: Riyadh, Saudi Arabia
- Coordinates: 24°39′54″N 46°43′9″E
- Named for: Al Yamama
- Completed: January 1957
- Inaugurated: 17 November 1958
- Demolished: July 2017

Design and construction
- Main contractor: Saudi Binladin Group

Al Yamamah Hotel (Arabic: فندق اليمامة) was a historic five-star hotel in the al-Malaz neighborhood of Riyadh, Saudi Arabia. Completed in January 1957 and officially inaugurated in November 1958, it was the largest hotel at the time of its completion and one of the earliest hotels constructed in the city, often frequented by writers, ministers, poets, members of the Saudi royal family as well as foreign dignitaries during state visits, such as Henry Kissinger and King Faisal II. The hotel was locally known for hosting weddings for several elites. It was demolished in 2017 and was named after the al-Yamama region of central Arabia.

== Overview ==
The construction of the hotel was built by Sheikh Eid bin Salem and inaugurated in 1956 by King Saud bin Abdulaziz. It was completed in November 1958 and was one of the earliest hotels built in Riyadh. The hotel was regarded one of the most luxurious in the city and was the largest one at the time of its completion.

The hotel was located in close proximity to the Riyadh International Airport and has hosted several foreign dignitaries during state visits, such as King Faisal II of Iraq in 1957 and then-US Secretary of State Henry Kissinger in 1973.

By late 1990s, the hotel became affordable to middle-class families who could organize wedding parties within its premises. The hotel was demolished in 2017.
