= Burj al-Malaz =

Tower building (now demolished) in Riyadh, Saudi Arabia

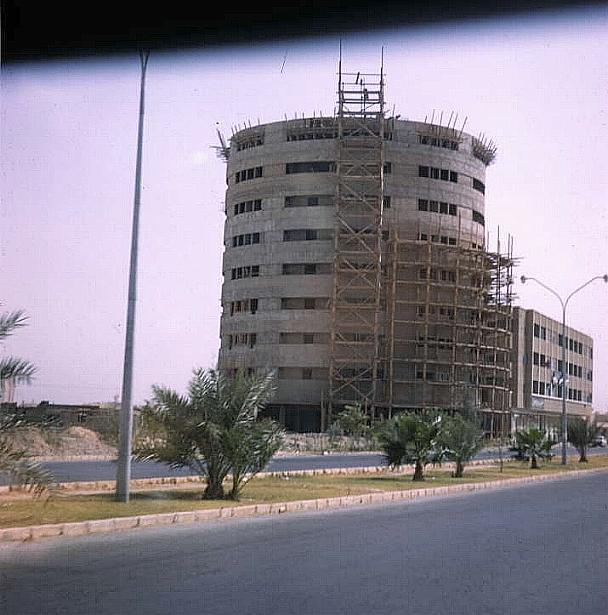
- Burj al-Arab, 1960s

General information
- Location: Riyadh, Saudi Arabia
- Completed: 1960s
- Demolished: 2009

Design and construction
- Main contractor: Arab Contractors

Burj al-Malaz (Arabic: برج الملز, lit. 'Malaz Tower'), also known as Burj al-Arab (Arabic: برج العرب, lit. 'Arab Tower'), Imarat al-Barmil (Arabic: عمارة البرميل, lit. 'barrel apartment building') and Capitol Records Building, was a cylindrical-shaped apartment building on al-Jamiʽah Street in the al-Malaz district of Riyadh, Saudi Arabia.

== History ==
It was built in the mid-1960s by Egyptian construction conglomerate Osman Ahmed Osman and was one of the most prominent landmarks of the district in the 1970s. The building was demolished in 2009.
