= Al Wizarat =

Neighbourhood in central Riyadh, Saudi Arabia

Al-Wizarat حي الوزارات Hara حارة
- Neighbourhood
- An alleyway in al-Wazarat, 2024
- Interactive map of Al-Wizarat
- Coordinates: 24°40′12″N 46°42′39″E
- Country: Saudi Arabia
- City: Riyadh

Government
  - Body: Baladiyah Al Malaz

Language
  - Official: Arabic

Hara al-Wizarat (Arabic: حارة الوزارات, lit. 'the ministries quarter'), or Hayy al-Wizarat (Arabic: حي الوزارات, lit. 'the ministries neighborhood'), colloquially known as Hara (Arabic: حارة, lit. 'quarter'), is a low-income residential neighborhood in central Riyadh, Saudi Arabia, located west of al-Dhubbat and south of al-Sulaimaniyah in the sub-municipality of al-Malaz. It was developed in the 1970s and hosts some of the country's government buildings, most notably the offices of the Ministry of Defense and the Royal Saudi Navy. It is the heart of the city, and it has also been overwhelmingly inhabited by overseas workers from Indians (People from Telangana to be specific)and Bangladesh since the 1980s.

Ash Sheikh Abdul Rahman Ibn Hasan Road, 2022

Al Wizarat was developed in the 1970s as a housing project for government employees working for the ministries located on the Old Airport Road (now King Abdulaziz Road). As Saudis began abandoning the area in search of new localities by the 1980s, it was subsequently tenanted by skilled foreign workers from India, Pakistan and Bangladesh who began arriving in the country soon after 1973 energy crisis and subsequent oil boom.
