= Dammam–Riyadh railway =

Dammam–Riyadh line
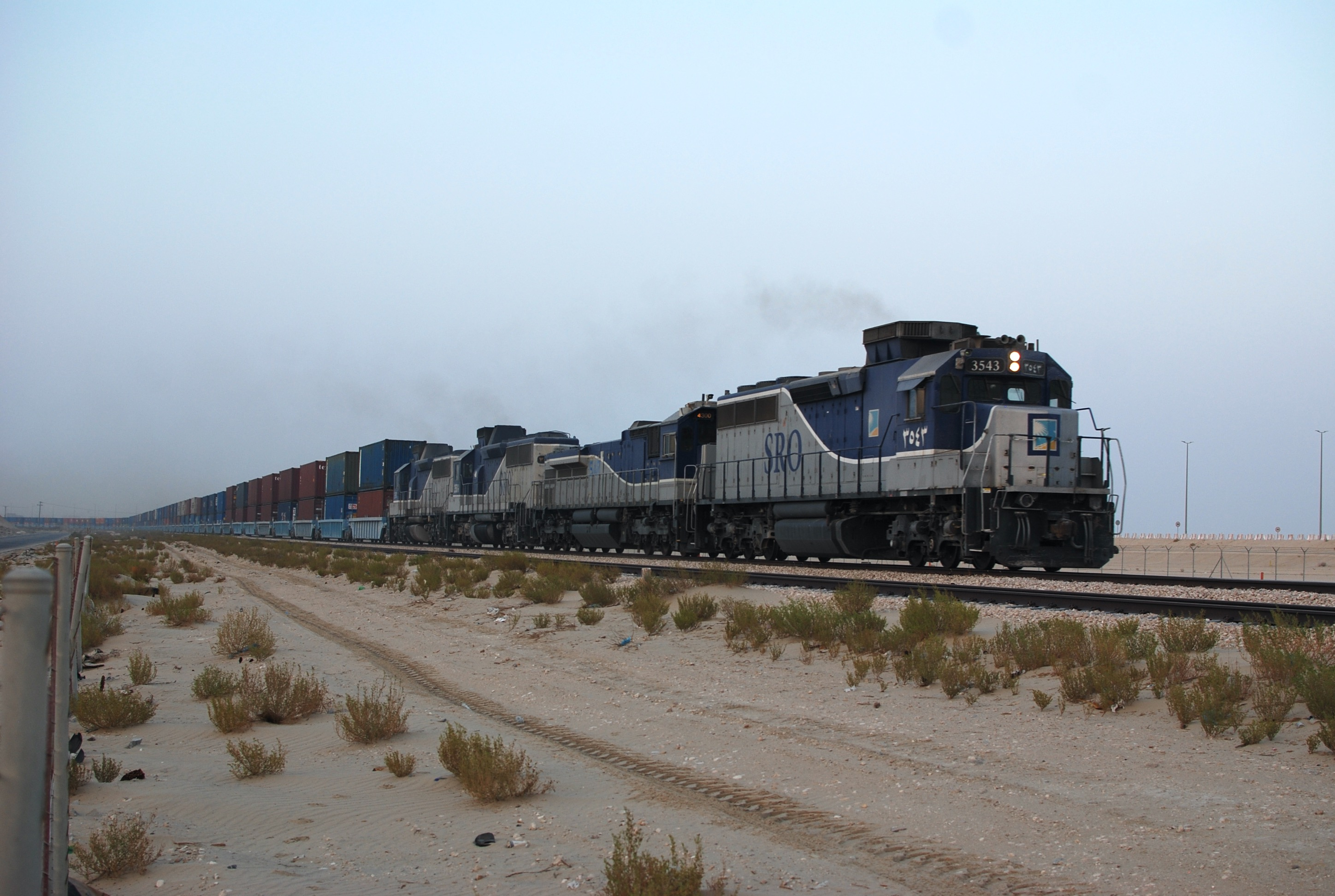
- A freight train on the line near Dhahran in August 2025

Overview
- Owner: Saudi Arabia Railways
- Locale: Eastern Province and Riyadh Province, Saudi Arabia
- Termini: Dammam; Riyadh East
- Stations: 4
- Website: www.sar.com.sa

Service
- Operator: Saudi Arabia Railways

History
- Opened: 1953 (freight); 1985 (passenger)

Technical
- Line length: 449 km (279 mi)
- Number of tracks: 2
- Character: At-grade
- Track gauge: 1,435 mm (4 ft 8 1/2 in) standard gauge
- Electrification: None
- Operating speed: 180 km/h (110 mph)
Route map
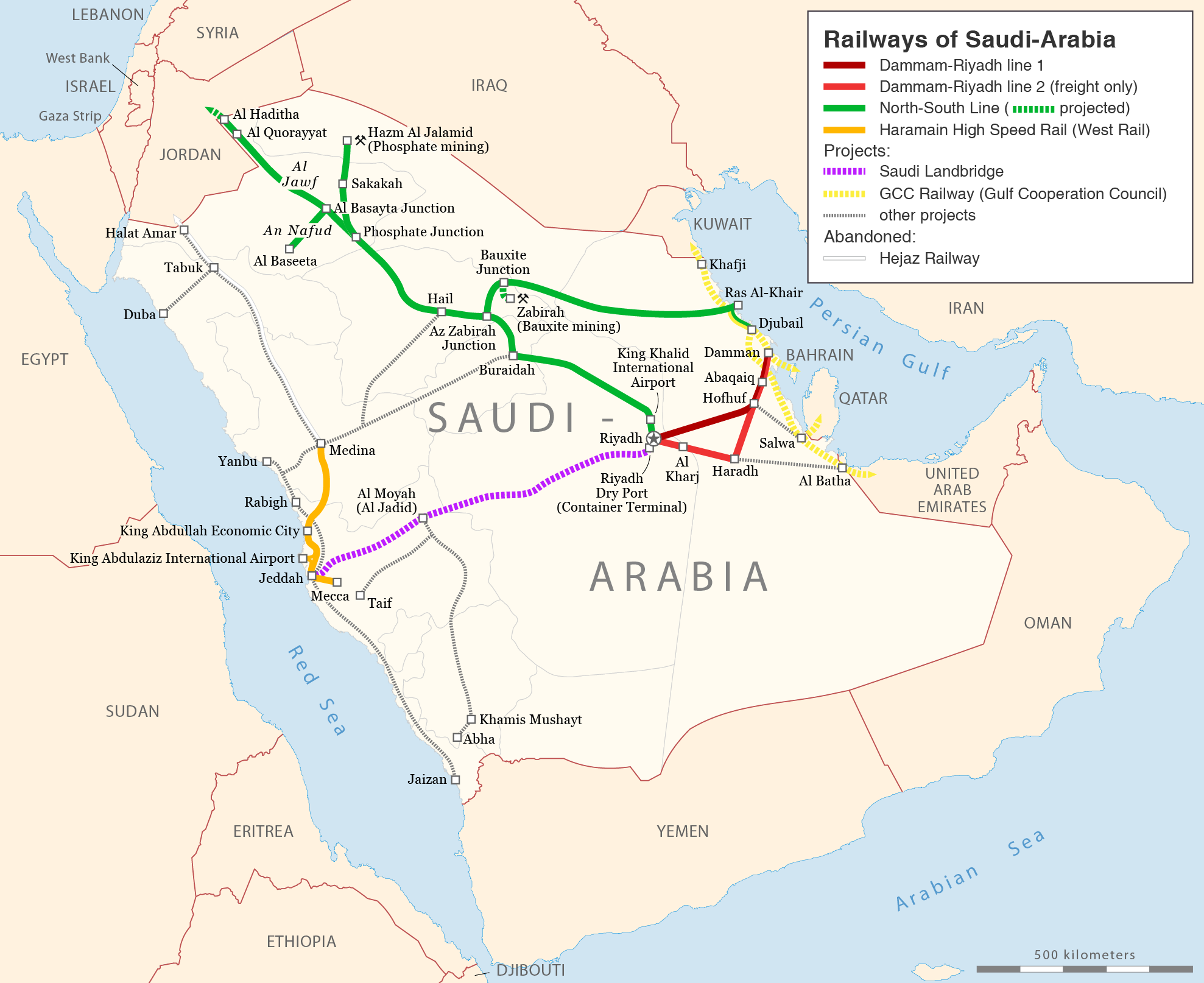

The Dammam–Riyadh line is a railway line in Saudi Arabia, connecting the Eastern Province's capital city of Dammam with the national capital of Riyadh. The line has two branches, with the original freight line running for 556 km (345 mi), and the passenger line running for 449 km (279 mi), with a 139 km (86 mi) shared section. First opened in 1953, the line has four stations. It is owned and operated by Saudi Arabia Railways.

== History ==
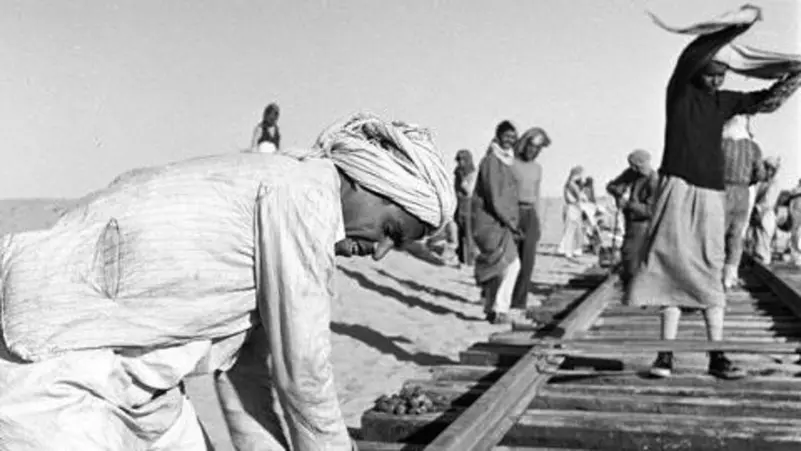
Construction of the line in 1947

Planning for the line started in 1947 with an agreement between King Ibn Saud and ARAMCO (the Arabian-American Oil Company, now Saudi Aramco) to lay a 547 km (340 mi) freight line. Bechtel Construction Company was chosen to build the rail line, as well as a sea port at the eastern end of the line at Dammam, with construction beginning in September 1947. In 1948, veteran American railroad engineer James H. Gildea was hired to oversee the project. The biggest obstacle to building the rail line was the Persian Gulf shallows at Dammam. To allow deep draft vessels to unload, a rail causeway of approximately 7 miles (11.3 km) was built out into the Persian Gulf. The first 5 miles (8.0 km) were a rock causeway and the last couple of miles a section made of a steel trestle. One of the first vessels to unload was a Dutch freighter, in 1950, with a load of rails for construction of the line. The first trains started moving between Dammam and Riyadh in 1953. Later, in 1985, the bypass line from Hofuf to Riyadh, which takes a more direct route, was opened, leading to the original line being used only by freight trains, and the new bypass being used by passenger trains only.

In December 2005, the SRO contracted a consortium made up of Siemens Transportation Systems and the Saudi Arabian Nour Communications Company to modernize both the passenger and freight lines with ETCS signalling and GSM-R communications equipment.

In July 2008, the Spanish rail vehicle manufacturer CAF announced that it had signed a contract for the supply of eight diesel push-pull trainsets in order to modernise passenger services on the line.

=== Upgrade ===
In 2011, it was announced that, as part of a 30-year master plan, there would be upgrades to the line to replace level crossings with grade separations, and to bypass of the city centre of Hofuf. This would allow trains to reach 200 km/h (120 mph).

Later, in August 2014, the SRO signed a contract with China Railway Construction Corporation for the renewal of 78.4 kilometres of the original freight line, and also signed contracts with a local contractor for the doubling of 241 kilometres of the line between Hofuf and Haradh. A month later, in September 2014, the SRO awarded a contract worth US$1.6 million to a consortium led by Spanish firm Consultrans to study alignments for a high-speed line linking Riyadh and Dammam. In February 2015, a contract was awarded for the supply of six diesel passenger trainsets, capable of running at 200 km/h (120 mph), to the Spanish company Talgo.

A second contract, again signed with China Railway Construction Corporation, for the upgrading of 91 kilometres of the freight line was signed in March 2015, forming the second phase of the line's upgrading project. Later, in July 2015, the SRO cancelled its previous contract with Talgo for the supply of six diesel passenger trainsets.

In December 2015, the SRO President stated that the speed of trains on the line would be raised from 140 to 160 km/h (87 to 99 mph) before the end of the year, and would further be increased to 180 km/h (112 mph) in 2016. On 7 December 2015, SRO began operating passenger services on the line using new CAF push-pull trainsets which operate at 180 km/h (112 mph). The trains entered service as the SRO completed double-tracking of the entire 449 km (279 mi) line.

=== Derailment ===
On the 17th of February, 2017, at about 1:00 AM, a train on the line derailed near Dammam, injuring 18 people. The derailment occurred after flooding from torrential rains caused the ground under the rail line to erode. The train was carrying 193 passengers and six crew members. SRO stated that all injuries were minor. All passengers were transferred to another train and transported to Dammam station. The line was closed for repair following the accident, and SRO suspended all rail services to Dammam. Services were only operated between Riyadh and Hofuf. Full service was resumed on 23 February 2017.

== Stations ==
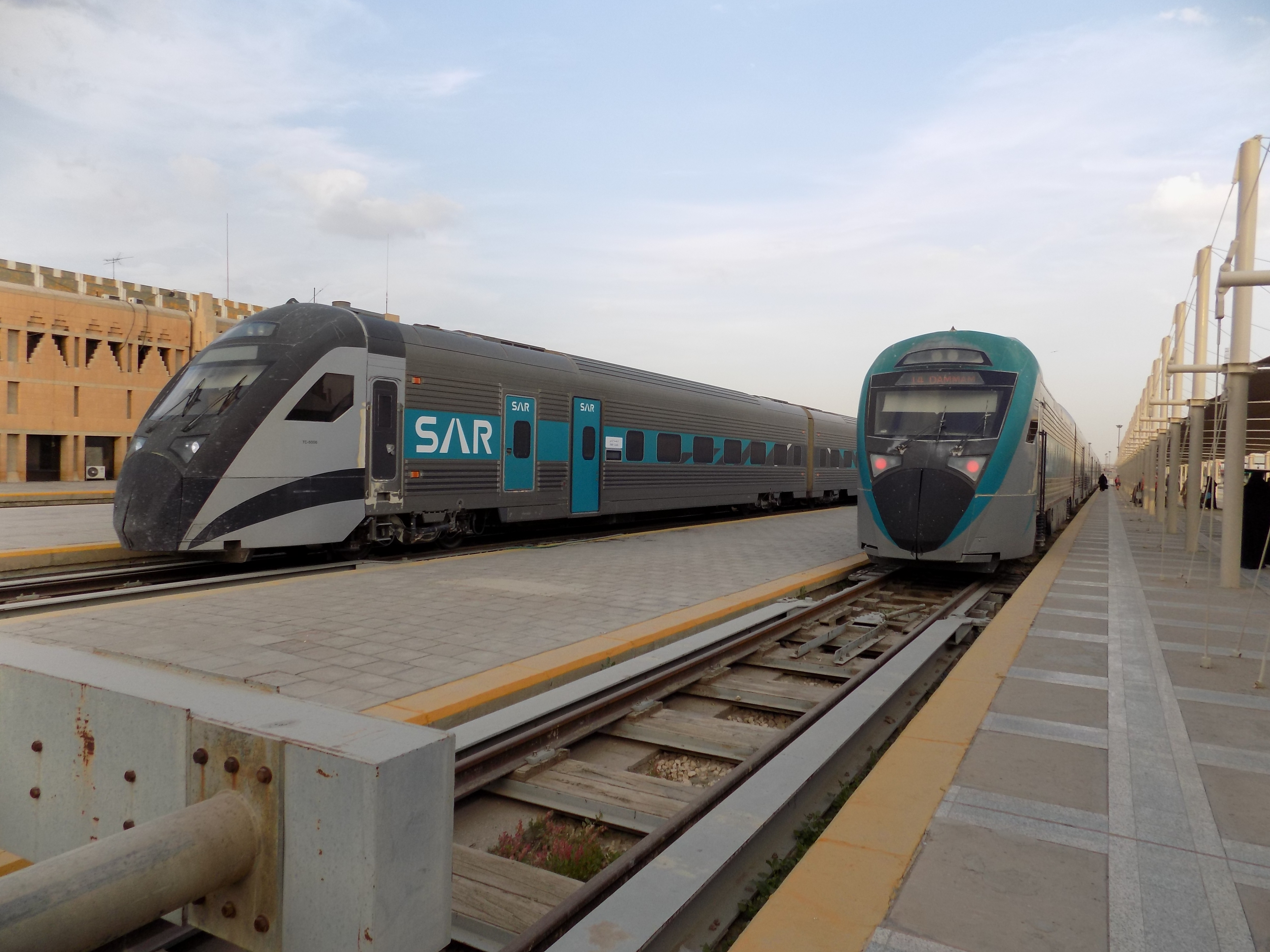
Push-pull passenger trainsets at Riyadh East station, January 2024

The stations at Dammam, Hofuf and Riyadh were designed and built by Lucio Barbera between 1978 and 1980. They were opened for public service in 1981. The terminus stations in Dammam and Riyadh are extremely similar and consist of a rectangular hall of three naves separated by two lines of pillars along the ends of the tracks, and two wings at the ends of the main hall along the outer tracks. The design is based on the layout of some mosques along the Mediterranean Sea, where the prayer hall is located at one side of a court with lesser wings along the sides of the court. The style and decoration of the buildings uses elements such as triangular openings to construct windows, arcades, and parapets with rectangular steps, elements bearing a resemblance to Nejd architecture but also common in other Arab architecture. The station building in Hofuf lies to the east of the through-line along one side. The decoration is very similar to the stations in Dammam and Riyadh.

There are four stations on the Dammam–Riyadh line:

#	Station name		Distance from origin
#	English	Arabic	Distance from origin
1	Dammam	الدمام	0 km
2	Abqaiq	بقيق	74 km
3	Hofuf	الهفوف	139.26 km
4	Riyadh (East)	الرياض	449 km

== Infrastructure ==
=== Rolling stock ===
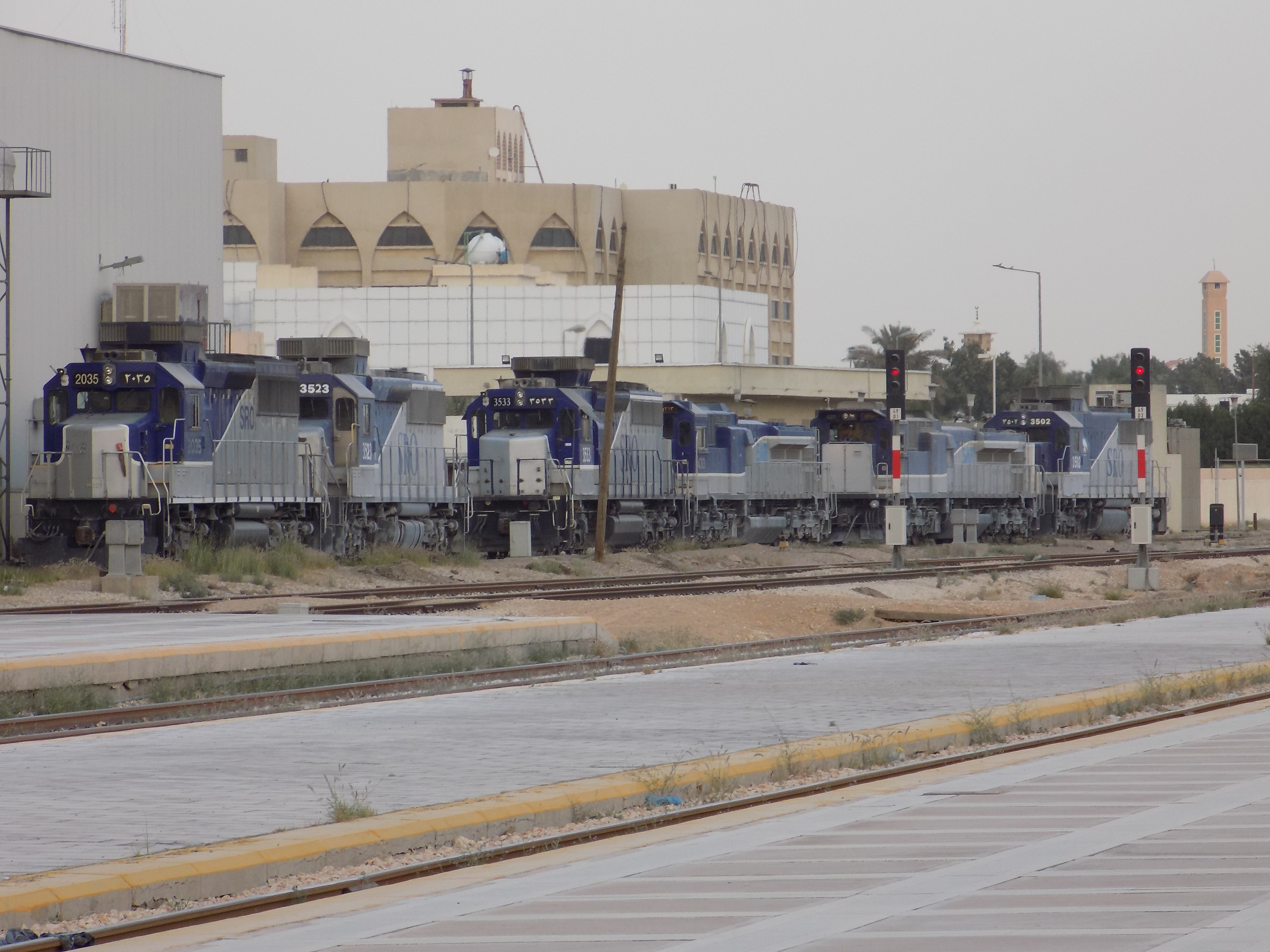
Locomotives in the sidings of Riyadh East station, January 2024

The Dammam–Riyadh line uses several different types of locomotives and rolling stock, mostly as the result of the circumstances of its construction. The line used many kinds of locomotives and passenger cars that were bought from the US' railroads in its early years, however as time progressed the SRO began to buy its own locomotives (mainly from Electro-Motive Diesel) and passenger cars. Passenger trains were hauled by locomotives from the start of passenger services in 1985 until the introduction of the CAF push-pull trainsets in 2015.

In August 2022, Saudi Arabia Railways launched a call for tenders for ten diesel passenger trainsets in order to increase capacity on the line. On February 5, 2024, SAR officially signed a contract with Stadler Rail for the supply of the ten trainsets, with an additional option for ten more being offered. The trains will be based on Stadler's existing Smile design. In October 2026, the option for ten more sets was exercised, bringing the total number of units ordered to 20.

Manufacturer/type	Image	Top speed		Number built	Notes	Year(s) built
Manufacturer/type	Image	mph	km/h	Number built	Notes	Year(s) built
Class 2400		50	80	7	Secondhand Diesel-electric locomotives taken over from NS by Volker Stevin in 1976 for construction works for a seaport in Jubail. Formerly 2427, 2445, 2485, 2497, 2499, 2519, 2523. Renumbered into 101–107. Sold to Archirodon for rail reconstruction between Dammam and Riyadh and renumbered to 276-04–276-09. Some scrapped in 1983. Others active until 1994 and stored in Hofuf afterwards.	1954–1956
EMD SW1001		N/A	N/A	5	Diesel-electric locomotives. Series 1022–1026	1981
EMD G18W		N/A	N/A	16	Diesel-electric locomotives; series 1006–1021. Built in several batches from 1968 (nos. 1006–1010), 1974 (nos. 1011–1015), and 1976 (nos. 1016–1021).	1968–1976
EMD GP18		N/A	N/A	1	Diesel-electric locomotive. No. 1200	1961
EMD FP7A		N/A	N/A	2	Diesel-electric locomotives taken over from the Arabian American Oil Company (there 1006–1007).	1953
EMD FP9A		N/A	N/A	7	Diesel-electric locomotives; series 1502–1508. Nos 1502 and 1503 scrapped.	1956–1959
EMD GP38-2		N/A	N/A	1	Diesel-electric locomotive; no. 2000.	1973
EMD SD38-2		N/A	N/A	6	Series 2004–2009. Order 778050. Diesel-electric locomotives	1978
EMD GT22CW		N/A	N/A	3	Diesel-electric locomotives; series 2001–2003.	1976
EMD SDL50		N/A	N/A	31	Series 3500–3530; Diesel-electric locomotives. Built in several batches from 1981 (nos. 3500–3505), 1984 (nos. 3506–3515), 1997 (nos. 3516–3522), and 2005 (nos. 3523–3530).	1981–2005
EMD GT46ACS		N/A	N/A	17	Diesel-electric locomotives. Series 4300–4316.	2013–2015
EMD SDL38		N/A	N/A	6	Diesel-electric locomotives. Series 2030–2035.	2016
Francorail-MTE CSE26-21		N/A	N/A	6	Diesel-electric locomotives; series 3603–3608. (nos. 3606, 3607, and 3608 renumbered 3600, 3601, 3602)	1983
Class 319.2		75	120	>4	Series 319; Diesel-electric locomotives bought second hand from the Spanish national railway Renfe in 2014.	19??
CRRC Qishuyan SDD17		62	100	8	Diesel-electric locomotives. Ordered in December 2014, first two locomotives delivered in July 2015.	2015–201?
CAF		112	180	8 passenger trainsets & 10 locomotives (5001–5010)	Push-pull trainsets with a power car at one end and a driving trailer car at the other.	2011–2013
Stadler Smile		N/A	N/A	20 passenger trainsets	Push-pull trainsets with two locomotives (one at either side). Ordered in 2024.	2026–

=== Tracks ===
The line uses type C.W.R UIC 60 rails.

=== Signaling system ===
In December 2005, the SRO contracted a consortium made up of Siemens Transportation Systems and the Saudi Arabian Nour Communications Company to modernize the Dammam–Riyadh line. The line was equipped with signaling technology including an electronic interlocking and Trainguard 100 for ETCS Level 1. GSM-Railway (GSM-R) mobile radio technology was also installed for communication use on the entire rail network.

In January 2025, the first push-pull trainset equipped with ETCS Level 2 entered passenger service.

== Operations ==
The total journey time is about 4.5 hours. From the 1st of June 2016, SRO began operating an express train that covered the distance between Riyadh and Dammam in 3 hours 40 minutes. The train departs from Dammam at 9:30AM and from Riyadh at 1:10 PM daily.

== See also ==
- Rail transport in Saudi Arabia
