= Jabal Abu Makhruq =

- Jabal Kharba; Camel's Eye
- Jabal Abu Makhruq, 2024

Highest point
- Elevation: 50 m (160 ft)
- Coordinates: 24°40′24″N 46°43′32″E

Naming
- Native name: Arabic: جبل أبو مخروق

Geography
- Location: Riyadh, Saudi Arabia

Jabal Abu Makhruq (Arabic: جبل أبو مخروق), or in Najdi vernacular pronunciation as Jabal Abo Makhrog and popularly known as Camel's Eye (Arabic: عين الجمل), is a conical limestone hill with a natural arch through it in the ad-Dubbat neighborhood of Riyadh, Saudi Arabia. With an elevation of approximately 50 meters, it is so named for a 7 to 8 meters wide, almost oval hole through the top of the hill that was formed due to erosion. It was mentioned in Yaqut al-Hamawi's 13th century work Kitāb Mu'jam al-Buldān as Jabal Kharba (Arabic: جبل الخربة) and was once a stopover for caravans arriving from Eastern Arabia en route to the walled town of Riyadh. The hill was once infamous among locals to be purportedly haunted by Jinns and demons.

== Overview ==
The hill is made of limestone and is known for its 7–8 meters wide cavity on the top of the hill that was formed due to erosion. It overlooks the district of al-Malazz and previously had lent its name to the area. The site later became a local visitor attraction as a place of relaxation, and thus, is also regarded as the oldest park of Riyadh years before the site surrounding the hill was transformed into a 40,000 square meters urban park in 1980 by the Riyadh Municipality.

Several historical accounts suggest that Abdulaziz ibn Saud had camped in the area the night before he engaged in the Battle of Riyadh in 1902. The site was visited by St. John Philby in 1918 and Japanese traveler and historian Eigiro Nakano mentioned this mountain in his 1939 book A Japanese Visit to the Arabian Peninsula.

In 2020, the Riyadh Municipality proposed to rehabilitate the park and announced a competition for its design. The designs were selected in 2021 and construction work began in 2023.
