= Hofuf =

City in Eastern Province, Saudi Arabia

Al Hofuf ٱلْهُفُوف
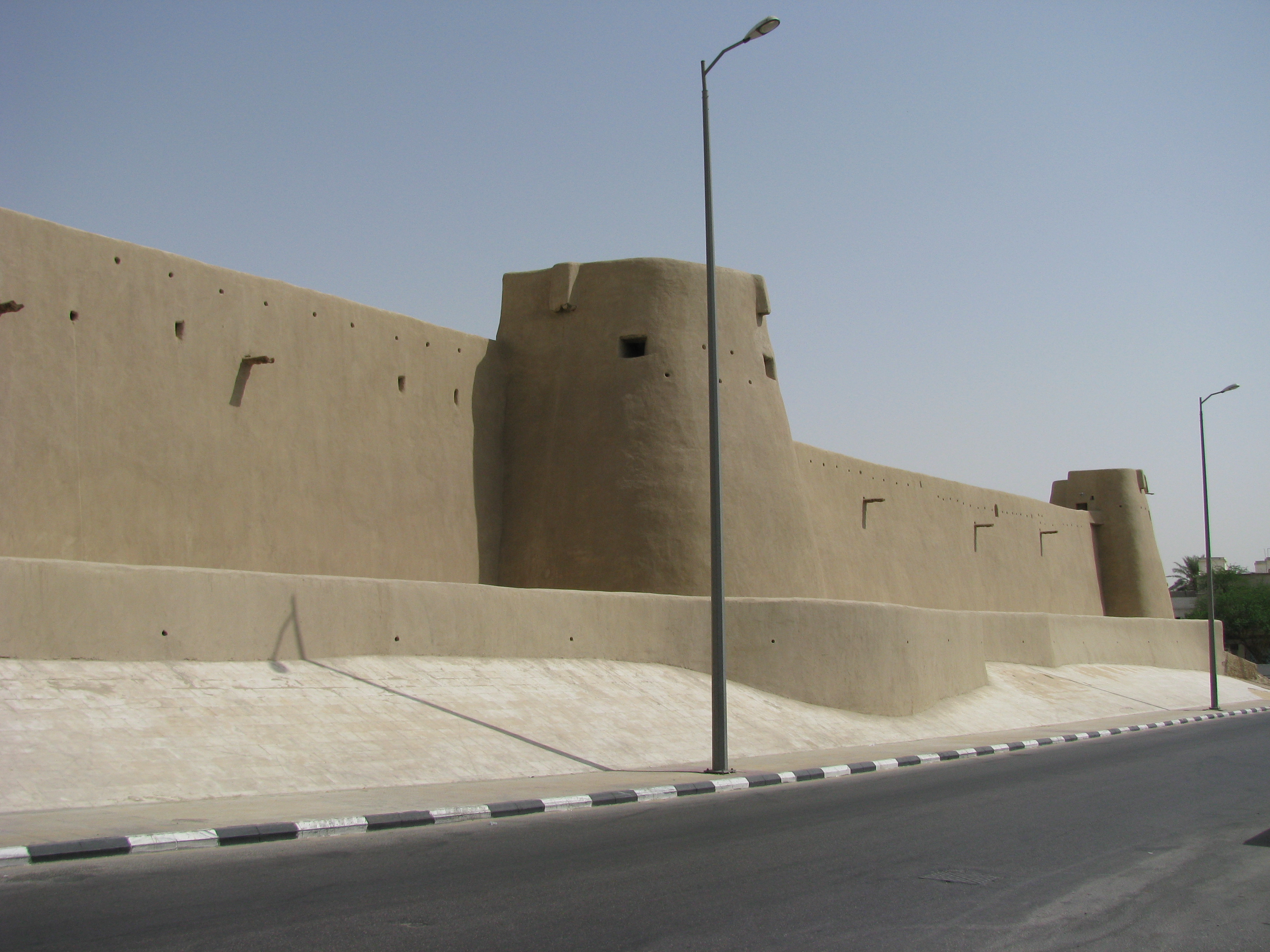
- Sahood Fort in Hofuf

- Location within Saudi Arabia
- Coordinates: 25°23′N 49°35′E
- Country: Saudi Arabia
- Province: Eastern

Government
  - Mayor: Saud bin Talal
  - Provincial governor: Saud bin Nayef Al Saud
- Elevation: 154 m (505 ft)

Population (2022)
  - Total: 729,606
- Time zone: UTC+3
  - Summer (DST): UTC+3
- Postal Code: (5 digits)
- Area code: +966-13
- Website: www.Hofuf.gov.sa

Al-Hofuf (Arabic: ٱلْهُفُوف al-Hufūf, sometimes spelt Hofuf or Hufuf), also known as Al-Hasa or Al-Ahsa is the seat of the Al-Ahsa Governorate, and the second-largest city in the Eastern Province of Saudi Arabia, after the capital, Dammam. With a population of 729,606 (as of 2022), it is the 6th most-populous city in Saudi Arabia, and the second-largest in the country to not be a provincial capital. It is known for being one of the largest date producing areas in the world, and for its old markets and palaces.

== Overview ==
The city proper has a population of 150,000 and is part of a larger populated oasis area of towns and villages, with a total population of around 600,000. It is located inland from the Persian Gulf, southwest of Abqaiq and the Dhahran–Dammam–Al-Khobar metropolitan area on the road south to Haradh. It is the closest city to the famous Ghawar oil field, one of the world's largest conventional (land-based) fields.

Legend places Hofuf as the burial place of Laila and Majnoon, the star-crossed pair of the most popular love story in the Arab and Muslim world. The Queen of Sheba is also fabled to have visited this city from her kingdom in South Arabia. German explorer Hermann Burchardt photographed the city in 1904.

== History ==
Hofuf was originally a Twelver Shi'a strongold, being majority Shi'ite and producing much, if not most of the Shi'ite scholarship of the Gulf. It also served as the headquarters of the Ottoman administration since 1871 when it was captured by the Ottoman Empire. It remained under Ottoman control until 1913, when it was captured by members of the Wahhabi movement, under Ibn Saud. In 1932, the Kingdom of Saudi Arabia was founded and the city took the name Hofuf, which has been among the kingdom's major cities since. Today, it remains only about half Shi'a, with the other half being Sunni Maliki, mostly from the same migrations as those to Bahrain and Kuwait.

== Economy ==
Historically, Hofuf made textiles out of wool, silk, and cotton. The town was also renowned for its fruit of the date palm, the Arabs considering the khalasi variety of dates, locally grown in Hofuf, and also the fardh variety of Oman, among the best. As of 1920, the city was known for making coffee pots from silver and brass.

== Climate ==
Al Hofuf has a hot desert climate (Köppen climate classification BWh) with long, very hot summers and mild, short winters.

Climate data for Al Ahsa (1991–2020)
Month	Jan	Feb	Mar	Apr	May	Jun	Jul	Aug	Sep	Oct	Nov	Dec	Year
Record high °C (°F)	32.7 (90.9)	37.8 (100.0)	41.8 (107.2)	45.4 (113.7)	49.0 (120.2)	50.6 (123.1)	51.3 (124.3)	50.8 (123.4)	48.9 (120.0)	46.0 (114.8)	38.1 (100.6)	33.0 (91.4)	51.3 (124.3)
Mean daily maximum °C (°F)	22.0 (71.6)	24.8 (76.6)	29.6 (85.3)	35.7 (96.3)	41.8 (107.2)	45.0 (113.0)	46.1 (115.0)	45.9 (114.6)	42.8 (109.0)	37.7 (99.9)	29.4 (84.9)	23.8 (74.8)	35.4 (95.7)
Daily mean °C (°F)	15.0 (59.0)	17.4 (63.3)	21.8 (71.2)	27.5 (81.5)	33.4 (92.1)	36.6 (97.9)	37.9 (100.2)	37.3 (99.1)	34.0 (93.2)	29.1 (84.4)	22.0 (71.6)	16.7 (62.1)	27.4 (81.3)
Mean daily minimum °C (°F)	9.0 (48.2)	10.9 (51.6)	14.7 (58.5)	20.0 (68.0)	25.2 (77.4)	28.1 (82.6)	29.8 (85.6)	29.2 (84.6)	25.8 (78.4)	21.2 (70.2)	15.5 (59.9)	10.8 (51.4)	20.0 (68.0)
Record low °C (°F)	−2.3 (27.9)	1.0 (33.8)	0.7 (33.3)	7.3 (45.1)	17.0 (62.6)	18.3 (64.9)	19.8 (67.6)	19.7 (67.5)	17.3 (63.1)	13.0 (55.4)	5.8 (42.4)	0.8 (33.4)	−2.3 (27.9)
Average precipitation mm (inches)	13.1 (0.52)	11.4 (0.45)	14.4 (0.57)	12.5 (0.49)	3.1 (0.12)	0.0 (0.0)	0.1 (0.00)	0.7 (0.03)	0.0 (0.0)	1.3 (0.05)	13.6 (0.54)	18.7 (0.74)	88.8 (3.50)
Average precipitation days (≥ 0.1 mm)	2.0	1.7	2.4	2.0	0.4	0.0	0.1	0.1	0.0	0.1	1.5	1.7	12
Average relative humidity (%)	55	49	44	38	27	22	23	30	33	39	47	56	39
Source 1: World Meteorological Organization, Meteomanz (extremes since 2021)
Source 2: Jeddah Regional Climate Center

== Demographics ==
Population

Historical population

Year	Pop.	±%
2004	572,679	—
2010	660,788	+15.4%

Year	Pop.	±%
2022	729,606	+10.4%

The population of Hufuf city increased from 660,788 in 2010 to 729,606 in 2022, an increase of approximately 10.4%. This growth reflects the city's continued urban development in Al-Ahsa Governorate, in Saudi Arabia's Eastern Province.

== Education ==
The faculties of agriculture, veterinary medicine and animal resources for King Faisal University are located in the city (the others being in Dammam). The Hofuf campus also has facilities where Saudi women can study medicine, dentistry and home economics.

== Transportation ==
=== Airport ===
The city is mainly served by King Fahd International Airport which is 160 km away in Dammam. Hofuf is also home to a small airport of its own, Al-Ahsa International Airport, which mainly offers domestic flights and flights to Dubai. During Operation Desert Shield and the Gulf War in 1991, Al-Ahsa Airport also served as an air base for the French Air Force.

=== Railway ===
The city has a railway station connecting the city with the capital Riyadh to the west and Dammam to the north. All railways in Saudi Arabia are operated by Saudi Arabia Railways.

Services at Hofuf station
- Preceding station	Saudi Arabia Railways	Following station
  Abqaiq towards Dammam	Dammam–Riyadh	Riyadh Terminus

== Notable people ==
- Samira Islam, pharmacologist and scholar
- Ibn Abi Jumhur al-Ahsa'i, Shi'a theologian
- Shaykh Ahmad al-Ahsa'i, Shi'a theologian
- Mohammed Al-Owais, Saudi footballer
