= Jarir Street =

Street in Riyadh, Saudi Arabia

- Jarir Streer, 2024
- Namesake: Jarir ibn Atiyah
- Length: 1.26 km (0.78 mi)
- Location: Riyadh, Saudi Arabia

Jarir Street (Arabic: شارع جرير) is a 1.26 km thoroughfare in Riyadh, Saudi Arabia. It is named after Umayyad-era Arab poet Jarir ibn Atiyah. The street emerged in the period 1958–1959 during the reign of King Saud bin Abdulaziz following the development of the al-Malazz district. The street has lent its name to the neighborhood of Jarir, where it runs.

== Overview ==
The street emerged during the reign of King Saud bin Abdulaziz in the period 1958–1959, in the same timeline of the development of al-Malaz and al-Nasiriyah districts. The street is named after early Umayyad-era Arab poet Jarir ibn Atiyah.

The street hosts a number of private residential villas, and has lent its name to the neighborhood of Jarir, where it runs besides the al-Malaz district as well as the Jarir Bookstore, which originated as a small bookshop on the street 1974.
