= Royal Secondary Industrial Institute =

Technology institute in Riyadh, Saudi Arabia

- المعهد الملكي الصناعي الثانوي
- Royal Secondary Industrial Institute, 2024
- Established: 1966; 59 years ago
- Parent institution: Technical and Vocational Training Corporation
- Location: Riyadh, Saudi Arabia; 24°38′49″N 46°43′46″E
- Website: rsii.tvtc.gov.sa

Royal Secondary Industrial Institute (RSII) (Arabic: المعهد الملكي الصناعي الثانوي), also Riyadh Polytechnic Institute (RPI), is a public institute of technology in the al-Malaz neighborhood of Riyadh, Saudi Arabia. It was established in 1966 and comes under the Saudi Technical and Vocational Training Corporation. Known for its pink colored dome, the building was built in 1959 by King Saud bin Abdulaziz and was initially intended to be the new headquarters of the Shura Council before being transformed into a polytechnic institute. Its exterior layout is modelled after the Heliopolis Palace in Cairo, Egypt.

== Overview ==
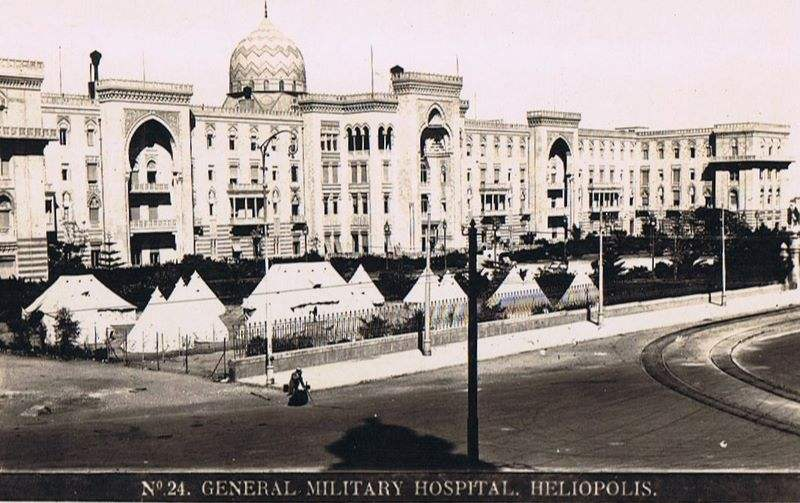
Heliopolis Palace in Cairo, Egypt, which the exterior of the Royal Secondary Industrial Institute is modelled after

The building was commissioned by King Saud bin Abdulaziz as part of the development of al-Malaz district in the 1950s. It was completed in 1959 and was intended to be headquarters of the Shura Council. However, in 1966, it was converted into a polytechnic institute. during the reign of King Faisal bin Abdulaziz. The building was constructed while incorporating elements of the Heliopolis architecture and modelled mainly after the Heliopolis Palace in Cairo, Egypt. The institute graduated its first batch of students in 1972.

The institute offers courses in various technical subjects, including mechanics, electricity, computer science and metal fabrication.
