= Thulaim =

Historic neighbourhood in Riyadh, Saudi Arabia

Thulaim ثليم
- Neighbourhood
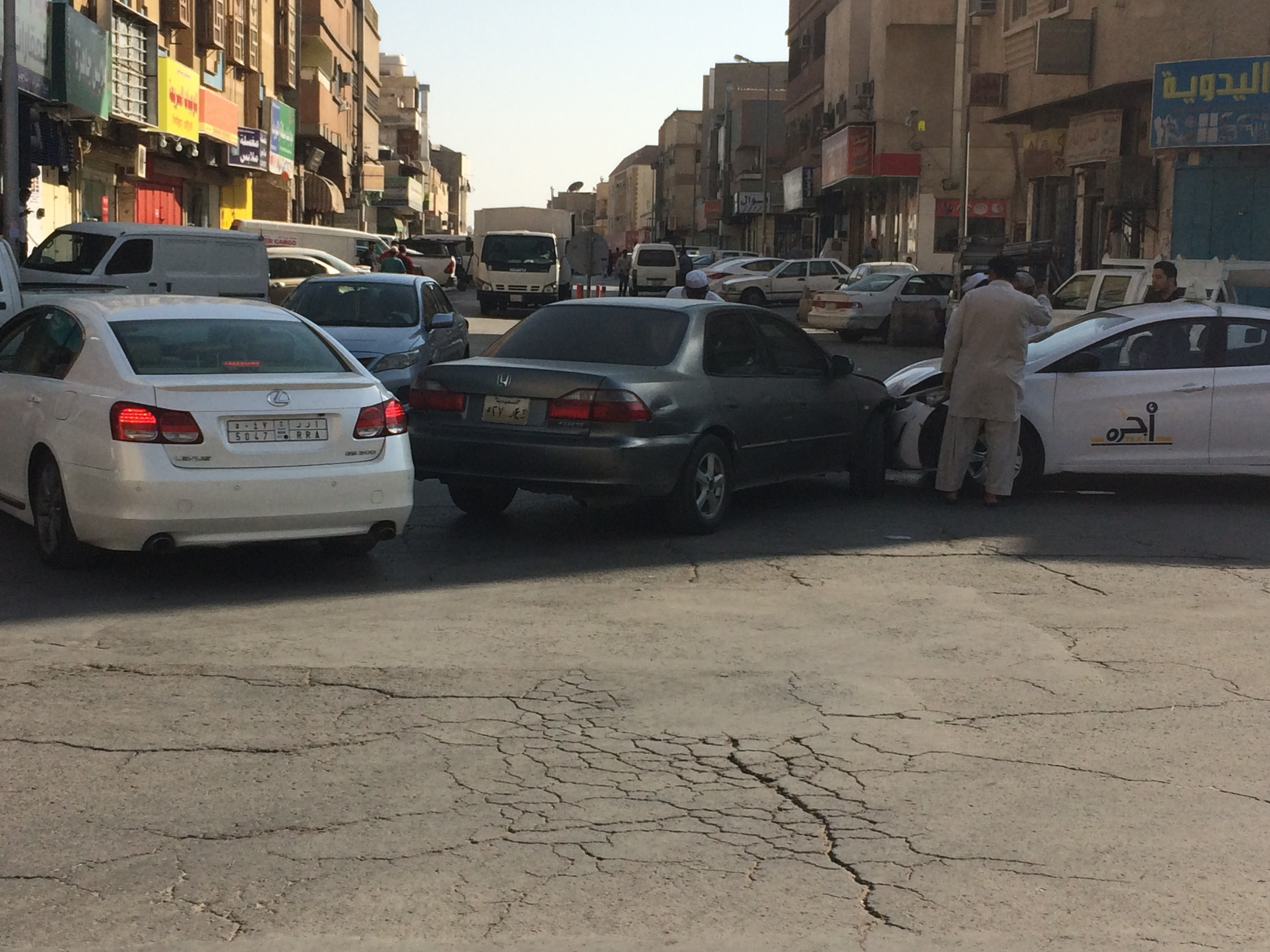
- Vehicle collision in Thulaim, around 2016

- Location within Saudi Arabia
- Coordinates: 24°38′28″N 46°43′37″E
- Country: Saudi Arabia
- City: Riyadh
- Region: Old Riyadh
- Named for: Thulaim Palace

Government
  - Body: Baladiyah al-Malaz

Language
  - Official: Arabic

Thulaim (Arabic: ثليم, romanized: ṯulaīm) is a commercial and residential neighborhood in downtown Riyadh, Saudi Arabia, located south of al-Amal and north of Margab in the sub-municipality of al-Malaz, situated on the edge of now dried up stream of Wadi al-Batʼha. The neighborhood is bounded by the al-Batʼha Street to the west, constituting its westernmost part in the al-Batʼha commercial area and is today inhabited mostly by overseas workers from India, Pakistan and Bangladesh. It is named after the Thulaim Palace, which was itself attributed to an eponymous farm on which it was built by King Abdulaziz ibn Saud in present-day al-Fouta district in late 1930s.

Owing to its visible furrows (Arabic: ثُلَم, lit. 'gaps') during medieval Najd, one historical account suggests that the area might've been referred to as al-Thalama (Arabic: الثلماء) during the existence of Hajr al-Yamamah, which was recorded in a poem by 8th century Abbasid poet Sulayman ibn Abi Hafsa.
