= Othaim Mall =

Shopping centre in Damman, Saudi Arabia

Coordinates: 26.399964°N 50.1165625°E

Olthaim Mall also known as Al Othaim Mall is a shopping centre in Damman, Saudi Arabia. It has 91,748 square metres (987,570 sq ft) of gross leasable area. It is owned by Al Othaim Investment Company. It includes a hypermarket and a West Elm furniture store.
