= Riyadh railway station =

Railway station in Saudi Arabia

Riyadh الرياض
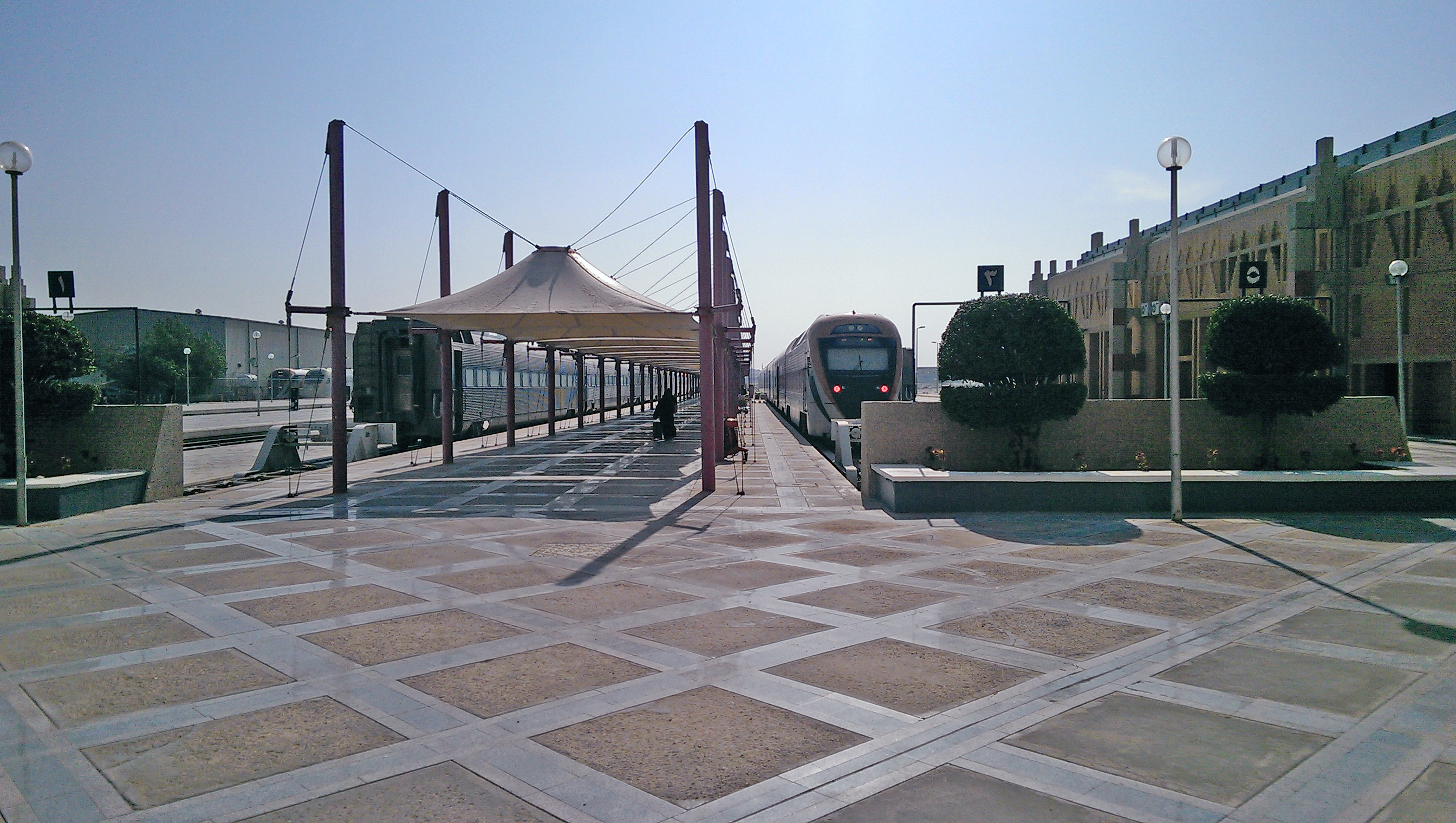

General information
- Location: Sinaiyah Qadeem, Riyadh, Saudi Arabia
- Coordinates: 24.6504°N 46.7406°E
- Owner: Saudi Arabia Railways
- Line: Dammam–Riyadh line
- Platforms: 6
- Train operators: Saudi Arabia Railways

Construction
- Structure type: Standard on-ground station
- Parking: Yes
- Cycle facilities: No

History
- Opened: 1981

Services
Preceding station	Saudi Arabia Railways	Following station
Hofuf towards Dammam	Dammam–Riyadh	Terminus
Location

Riyadh railway station is one of the two main railway stations in Riyadh, Saudi Arabia, the other being Riyadh North Station. It is located in the Sinaiyah Qadeem district, and is the western terminus of the Dammam–Riyadh line.

The station was designed by Italian architect Lucio Barbera in 1978 and was opened for public service in 1981. The station's design was inspired by the architecture of some mosques along the Mediterranean Sea. The building comprises the main lobby from which extends two wings. The wings, enclose the railway platforms. The roof is made from prefabricated, pre-stressed beams. The exterior is clad in local limestone. The style and decoration of the building use elements such as triangular openings to construct windows, arcades and parapets with rectangular steps, elements bearing a resemblance to Nejd architecture but also common in other Arab architecture. The station includes a main concourse, ticket area, and platform area.

The stations in Riyadh, Dammam, and Hofuf were all designed by Lucio Barbera and share similar design.

== See also ==
- List of railway stations in Saudi Arabia
