= Sinaiyah al-Qadimah (Riyadh) =

First industrial district of Riyadh, Saudi Arabia

As-Sinaiyah الصناعية
- Industrial district/Neighborhood
- First Industrial City
- Sinaiyah al-Qadimah, 2024
- Country: Saudi Arabia
- City: Riyadh
- Established: 1973

Government
  - Body: Baladiyah Al Batha; Baladiyah Al Malaz

Language
  - Official: Arabic

Sinaiyah al-Qadimah (Arabic: الصناعية القديمة, romanized: aṣ-Ṣināʿīyah al-Qadīmah, lit. 'old industrial area'), officially First Industrial City, and often shortened to as-Sinaiyah, is an industrial district in Riyadh, Saudi Arabia, located southwest of al-Malazz and north of al-Khalidiyyah in the sub-municipalities of al-Malaz and al-Batha. It was established west of the Riyadh Rail Station in 1973 during the reign of King Faisal bin Abdulaziz as part of the first national five-year development plan of 1970–1975, covering an area of 123.5 acres. The southern part of the district is popular for its automobile workshops and spare parts stores. It is overseen by the Saudi Authority for Industrial Cities and Technology Zones (MODON).

== History ==
According to the Saudi Authority for Industrial Cities and Technology Zones, Sinaiyah Qadeem was established in 1973 during the time of King Faisal bin Abdulaziz and thus, is the oldest industrial district in the Saudi capital. Bordered with al-Malaz neighbourhood and Al Kharj Road, due to which it got the nickname Sinaiyah al-Kharj, The district is popular for its automobile workshops and spare parts stores in the entire city. In 1981, the Riyadh railway station was founded in north of the district.

== Gallery ==
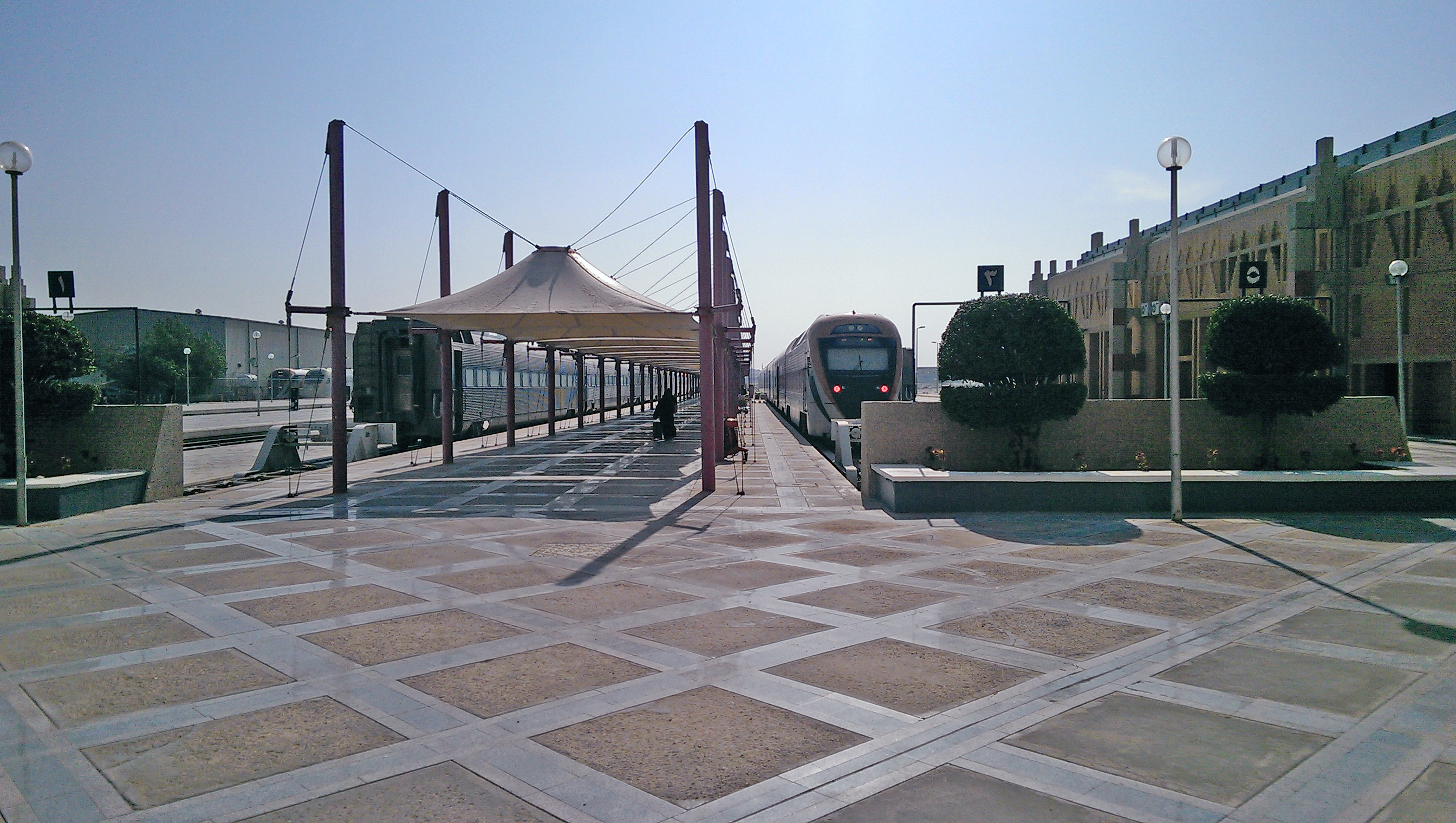
Riyadh Rail Station, which connects Dammam-Riyadh line at Qadeem Sinaiyah
