= Jarir Bookstore =

Saudi Arabian bookstore chain

Jarir Marketing Company
- Trade name: Jarir Bookstore
- Native name: مكتبة جرير
- Type: Public
- Traded as: Tadawul: 4190
- ISIN: SA000A0BLA62
- Industry: Retail; Bookshop; Book publishing
- Founded: July 9, 1979; 47 years ago
- Founder: Al-Agil brothers
- Headquarters: Al Olaya, Riyadh, Saudi Arabia
- Number of locations: 79 (2026)
- Area served: Gulf Cooperation Council
- Key people: Mohammed Bin Abdulrahman Al-Agil (Chairman); Abdulkarim Bin Abdulrahman Al-Agil (CEO); Nasser Bin Abdulaziz Alagil (Chief operating Officer)
- Products: Books; Office supplies Electronics
- Revenue: SAR 11,365 million (2025)
- Net income: SAR 1,049 million (2025)
- Total assets: 3,883,246 SAR (30/06/2019)
- Website: jarir.com

Jarir Marketing Company (Arabic: شركة جرير للتسويق), also known as Jarir Bookstore (Arabic: مكتبة جرير), is a Saudi Arabian establishment founded by Abdulrahman Nasser Al-Agil. Currently, Jarir has a paid-up capital of SR 1.20 Billion. Jarir's headquarters is located in Riyadh, Saudi Arabia. Jarir operates through two divisions: retail (including online sales), under the trademark of Jarir Bookstore, and a wholesale division.

Jarir is active in the Gulf Cooperation Council, trading in Office and School Supplies, Children's Toys and Educational Aids, Arabic and English Books and Publications, Arts and Crafts Materials, Computer Peripherals and Software, Mobile Phones and Accessories, Audio Visual Instruments, Photography Tools, Smart Television and Maintenance of Computers and Electronic items.

== History ==
Jarir was established in Riyadh in 1974 as a small bookshop on Jarir Street, from where it derives its name. It dealt in used books and art sold by expats living in Riyadh, Saudi Arabia. In 1979 the business was set up in Riyadh as a general partnership; it later became a Saudi joint stock company. In the 1980s, Jarir opened a second branch in Riyadh followed by one in the 1990s. In 2003, the company had undergone an initial public offering and a third of its shares is currently traded on Tadawul the Saudi stock exchange. In 2017, Jarir was recognized as the 7th “Most Valuable Retail Brand” in Saudi Arabia (BRANDZ Top 20 Most Valuable Saudi Arabian Brands). In 2018, Jarir figured in the “Top 100 Listed Companies” in the Arab World (Forbes, Middle East).

Due to the COVID-19 pandemic, online sales rose six-fold in the second quarter of 2020 compared with the previous year.

In 2025 the company reported revenue of SAR 11,365 million and a net profit of SAR 1,049 million.

== Branches ==
As of August 2026, Jarir had 79 stores, 68 of them in Saudi Arabia. In July 2021 the company listed the following stores:

- Saudi Arabia: 59 stores
- Kuwait: 3 stores
- Qatar: 3 stores
- UAE: 2 stores
- Bahrain : 1 store

The headquarters is located in Riyadh, Saudi Arabia.
