= Jarir ibn Atiyah =

Arab poet and satirist (c. 650 – c. 728)

- جَرِيرُ بْنُ عَطِيَّةَ اَلْخَطَفِيُّ اَلتَّمِيمِيُّ
- Born: c. 650; Najd, Rashidun Caliphate (present-day Saudi Arabia)
- Died: c. 728; Najd, Umayyad Caliphate (present-day Saudi Arabia)
- Occupations: Poet, Satirist
- Writing career
- Language: Arabic
- Period: Umayyad period
- Genres: Satire, Eulogy

Jarir ibn Atiyyah al-Khatafi Al-Tamimi (Arabic: جَرِيرُ بْنُ عَطِيَّةَ اَلْخَطَفِيُّ اَلتَّمِيمِيُّ) (c. 650 – c. 728) was an Umayyad-era Arab poet and satirist from Najd in Saudi Arabia. He was born during the reign of Rashidun caliph Uthman ibn Affan, and was a member of the Kulayb tribe, a part of the Banu Tamim. He was a native of al-Yamamah, but also spent time in Damascus at the court of the Umayyad caliphs.

Little is known of his early life, but he succeeded in winning the favor of Al-Hajjaj bin Yousef, the governor of Iraq. Already famous for his verse, he became more widely known by his feud with rival poets Farazdaq and Akhtal. Later he went to Damascus and visited the court of the caliph Abd al-Malik and that of his successor, Al-Walid I. From neither of these did he receive a warm welcome. He was, however, more successful with Umar II, and was the only poet received by the pious caliph.

His verse, like that of his contemporaries, is largely satire and eulogy.

A long series of verses by Farazdaq cover in satire his feud with Jarir and his tribe, the Bani Kulaib. These poems are published as the Nakaid of Jarir and al-Farazdaq. It is said that the feud between them lasted 40 years. Al-Farazdaq died around 728-730 AD/110-112 AH (aged 87-89), upon hearing the news, Jarir was deeply saddened and composed a famous grief elegy (Rithā') mourning his lifelong rival. Jarir died a few months later in the same year.
