= Al Malaz Sub-Municipality =

Baladiyah in Riyadh, Saudi Arabia

Al Malaz بلدية الملز
- Baladiyah
- Interactive map of Al Malaz
- Country: Saudi Arabia
- City: Riyadh
- Seat: Al Malazz
- Boroughs: List: al-Malazz az-Zahra ad-Dhubat al-Faruq Thulaim al-Futah Al Wizarat Jarir ar-Rabwah al-Safa al-Murabba al-Amal al-Sulaimaniyah
- Website: malaz.alriyadh.gov.sa

Al-Malaz Sub-Municipality (also Al-Malaz; Arabic: بلدية الملز) is one of the 16 baladiyahs of Riyadh, Saudi Arabia. Besides the eponymous neighborhood after which it is named, it consists of 15 other localities and sub-districts, including az-Zahra, al-Faruq, ad-Dhubat, Jarir and ar-Rabwah. and is responsible for their planning, development and maintenance.

== Sub-districts and neighbourhoods ==
Baladiyah al-Malaz consists of 15 neighbourhood and sub-districts:

- al-Malazz
- az-Zahra
- ad-Dhubat
- al-Faruq
- Thulaim
- al-Futah
- Jarir
- Al Wizarat
- ar-Rabwah
- al-Safa
- al-Murabba
- al-Olaya (partially)
- Sinaiyah Qadeem (partially)
- al-Amal
- al-Sulimaniyah (partially)
