= Al Malaz =

Al-Malaz حي الملز
- Neighbourhood
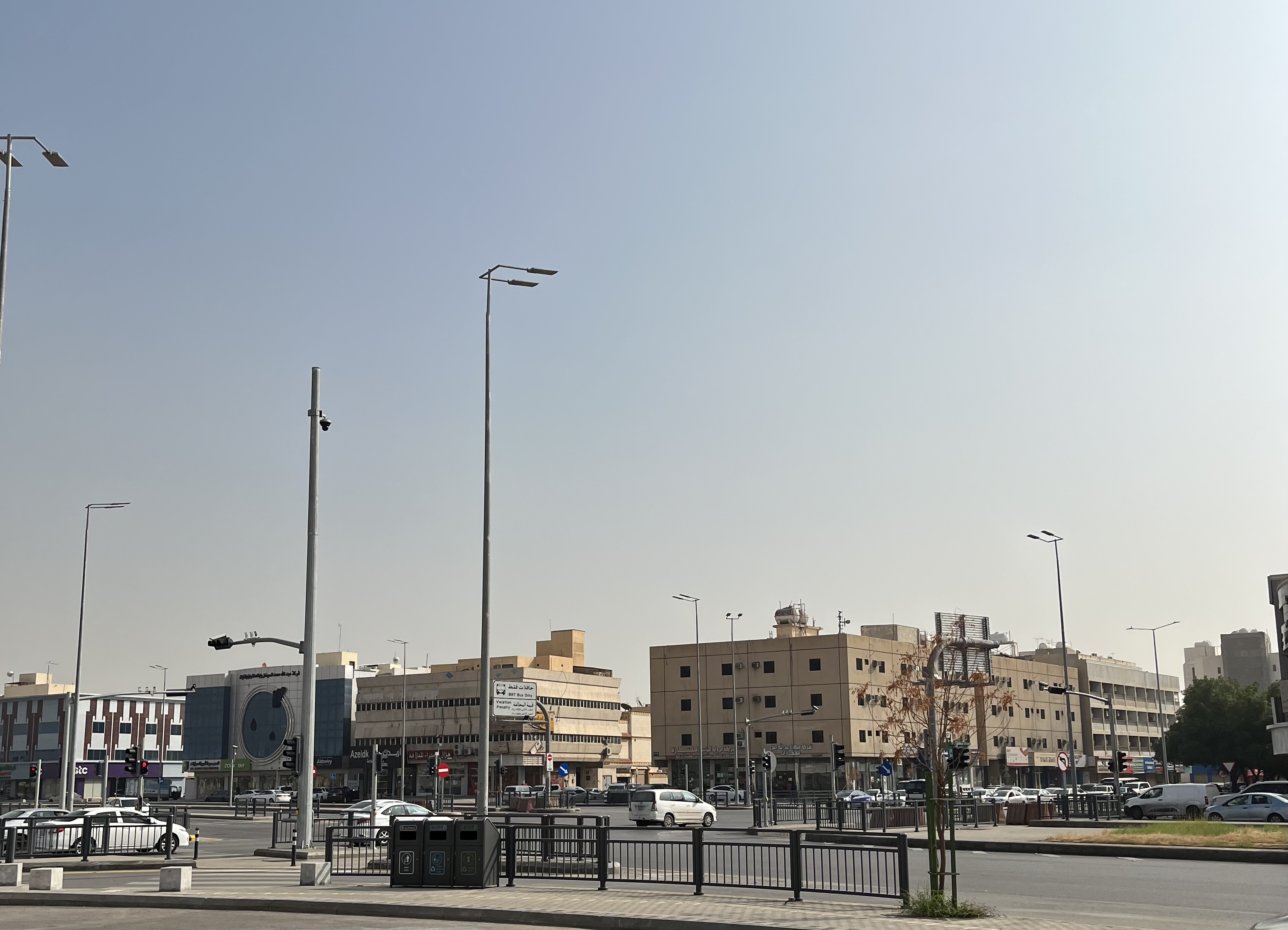
- Al-Malazz, 2023

- Location within Saudi Arabia Location within Asia
- Coordinates: 24°39′53″N 46°44′7″E
- Country: Saudi Arabia
- City: Riyadh
- Established: 1954
- Founder: Saud bin Abdulaziz
- Named for: Al-Malaz Square

Government
  - Body: Baladiyah Al Malaz

Language
  - Official: Arabic

Al-Malaz (Arabic: حي الملز, romanized: ḥaī al-Malaz), formerly al-Riyadh al-Jadidah (lit. The New Riyadh) and the Red Sea neighborhood, is a commercial and residential neighborhood in Riyadh, Saudi Arabia, and the seat of the homonymous sub-municipality of al-Malaz. Named after the al-Malaz Square (now King Abdullah Park), it was built in the 1950s by King Saud bin Abdulaziz as a housing project for government employees and was later developed into a full-fledged district. The neighborhood has a large presence of overseas Syrian community alongside native Saudi nationals.

It is the very first modern locality in the city, alongside the al-Nassiriyah district, which replaced the local Najdi architecture with a modern one. The area is also popular for hosting several iconic landmarks, supermarkets, streets and offices of government ministries.

== Etymology ==
The word al-Malaz is derived from laz (Arabic: لز), which loosely translates to 'running fast in a race', referring to the horse racing events that used to take place in an equestrian field later named al-Malaz Square.

== History ==
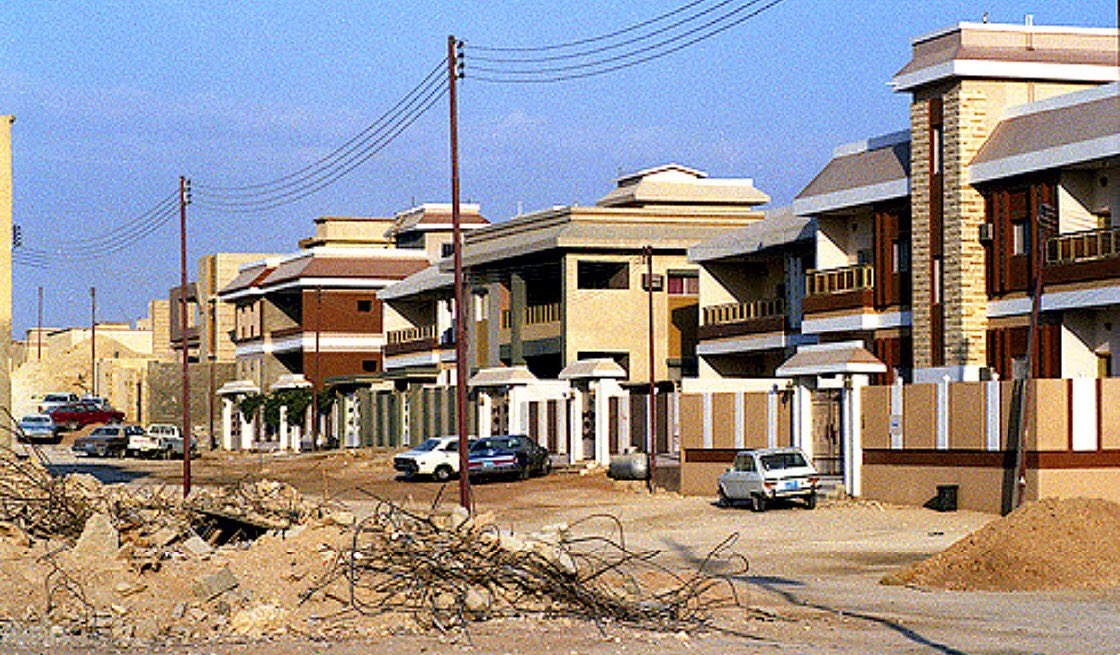
Al Malazz neighborhood in 1978

Prior to its development and during the early days of Saudi Arabia's establishment, the area had several names such as Abu Makhruq (after Jabal Abu Makhruq), Wattah and al-Kharba. The area barely had buildings or streets except an equestrian field, known as al-Malaz Square, where King Abdulaziz ibn Saud enjoyed horse racing shows and from where the locality adopted the name Al Malaz by the end of his reign, which was later shifted to Jenadriyah Farm in 2002. After the ascension of King Saud bin Abdulaziz to the throne in 1953, he initiated the relocation of government ministries from Jeddah to Riyadh. In order to meet the accommodation needs of the employees, he launched the 'Al-Malaz Housing Project' of almost 750 villas for the same. According to the scholar and urban planner Faisal al-Mubarak, Al-Malaz was a large-scale housing development encompassing 754 single-family homes, 340 apartment units, and a plethora of supporting facilities including a municipal hall, a library, a fire station, schools, a market, and recreation and health facilities.

The Al Malaz suburb stood as an antithesis to the traditional mud communities surrounding the walled town.

— Faisal al-Mubarak

In 1957, the first campus of King Saud University was established in the area, followed by Riyadh Zoo. In 1958, the Al Yamamah Hotel was completed. The building of Royal Secondary Industrial Institute was completed in 1959. In the 1960s, the Burj al-Malaz was completed. The neighbourhood saw rapid development and expansion during the economic boom of the late 1970s and early 1980s, which later included several shopping centres, schools and restaurants. And in the same period, the neighborhood began to be populated by expatriates as most of the original Saudi residents had moved to north of the capital.

In 1993, the King Fahd Mosque was completed.
