= List of railway stations in Saudi Arabia =

List of Railway stations in Saudi Arabia:

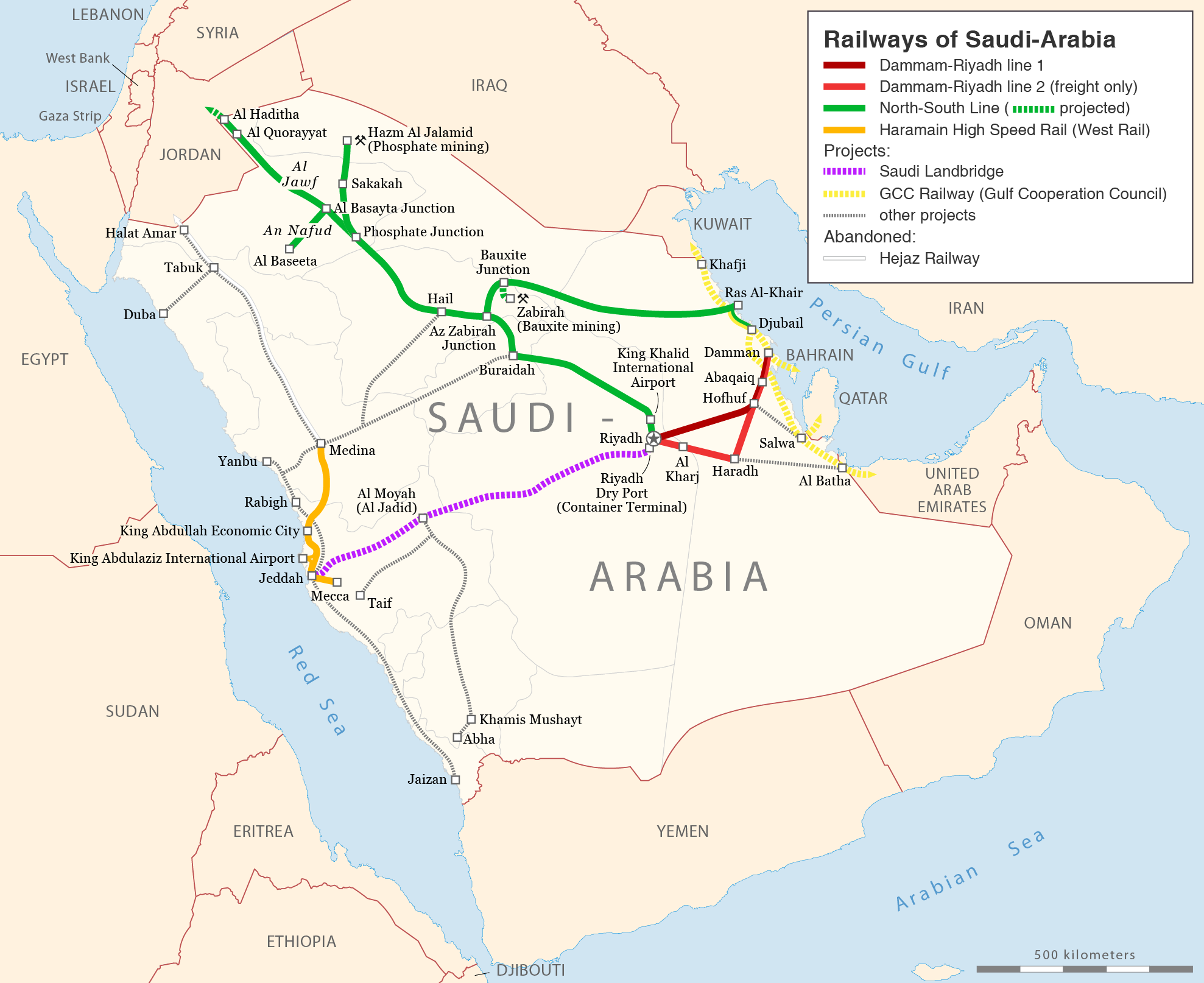
Saudi Railway Organization Projects. Red is the functional line as of 2008. Black is the Saudi Landbridge. The North South Railway connects Riyadh to Jordan. The Haramain High Speed Rail Project will connect Mecca to Medina.

== SRO Dammam-Riyadh railway ==
Station name	Region	Opened
Dammam		1981
Abqaiq		1981
Al-Hofuf		1981
Riyadh		1981

== SAR Cargo Line ==
Station name	Region	Opened
King Abdul Aziz Port		1950s
Al-Ahsa		
Abqaiq		
Al-Kharj		
Haradh		
Al-Tawdhihiyah		
Riyadh Dry Port		1950s

== SAR Riyadh-Qurayyat Line ==
Station name	Region	Opened
Riyadh		26 February 2017
Al Majma'ah		26 February 2017
Qassim		2018
Ha'il		2018
Al-Jawf		2018
Qurayyat		2018
Al-Haditha		Proposed

== SAR North South Railway Line ==
Station name	Region	Opened
Jalamid		Open
Ha'il		Open
Zabirah		Open
Ras Al-Khair		Open

== Haramain high-speed railway ==
Station name	Region	Opened
Madinah (Medina)		11 October 2018
King Abdullah Economic City		11 October 2018
King Abdulaziz International Airport, Jeddah		11 December 2019
Jeddah Central		11 October 2018 (was out of service between 29 September 2019 - 31 March 2021)
Makkah (Mecca)		11 October 2018

== Under Construction or Proposed ==
- North South line
  - Haditha – near Jordan border

  - Al-Jawf – junction, south of Al-Jawf, station near the new motorway.

  - Jubail

  - Bosajata – junction

- Saudi Landbridge
- (Dark Blue on Map)
  - Riyadh – national capital
  - Jeddah Central (connected to port)

== Defunct ==
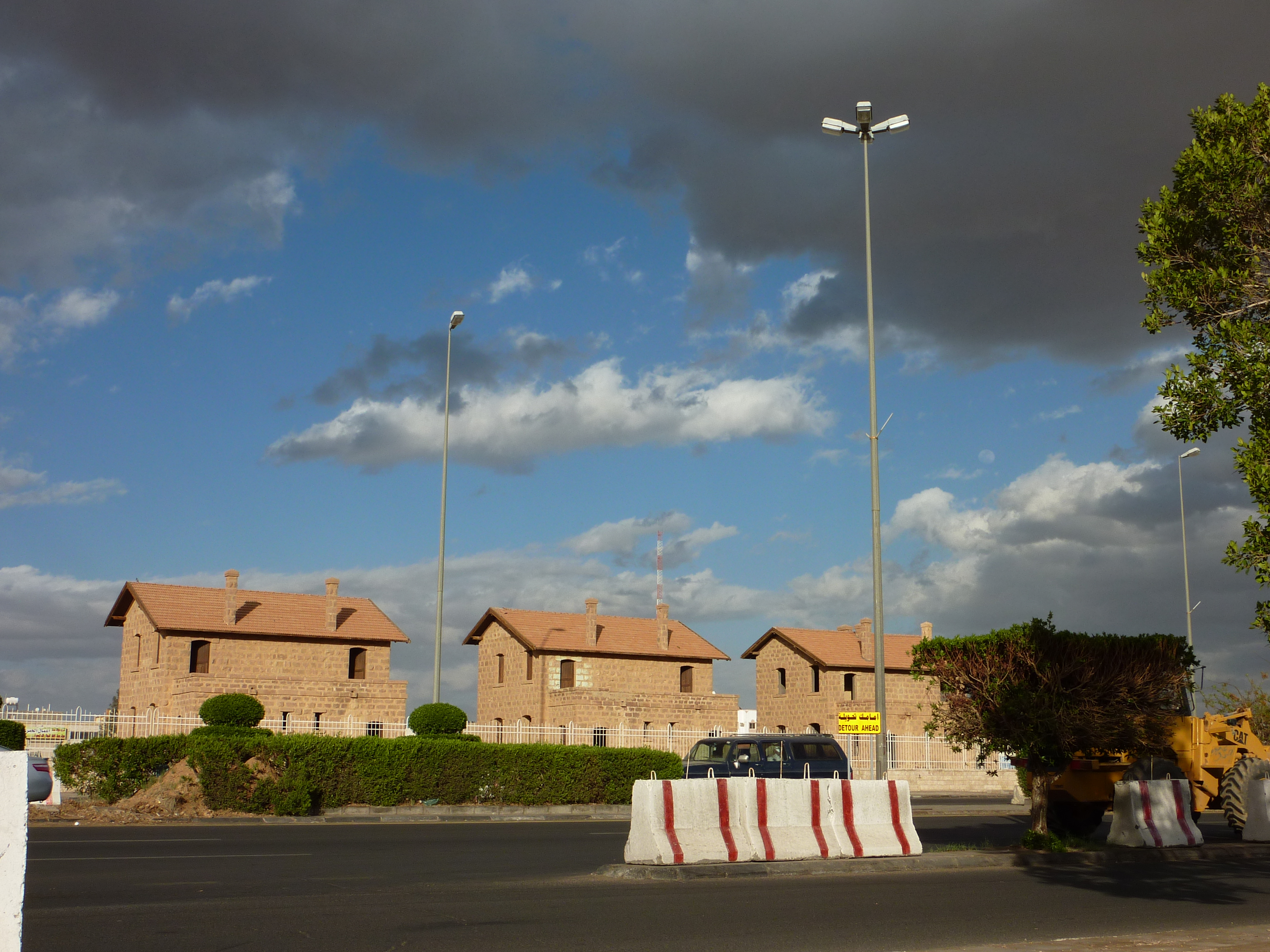
Tabuk station

The Hejaz Railway was a narrow gauge railway (1,050 mm / 3 ft 5 11/32 in track gauge) that ran from Damascus to Medina, through the Hejaz region of Saudi Arabia, with a branch line to Haifa on the Mediterranean Sea. It was a part of the Ottoman railway network. The line was and was planned to extend from the Haydarpaşa Terminal in Kadikoy beyond Damascus to the holy city of Mecca. However, due to the interruption of the construction works caused by the outbreak of World War I, it got no further than Medina, 400 kilometres (250 mi) short of Mecca The length of the line from Damascus to Medina was 1,300 kilometres (810 mi). Hejaz Railway stations in Saudi Arabia were:

Station name	Notes
Tabuk	
Mada'in Saleh	
Al-'Ula	
Medina	Now the Hejaz Railway Museum. Opened in 2006.

== See also ==
- Transport in Saudi Arabia
- Saudi Railway Company
- Saudi Railways Organization
