= North–South railway (Saudi Arabia) =

Freight rail network in the Middle Eastern country

SAR North–South Railway line

Overview
- Status: Operational
- Owner: Saudi Arabia Railways (SAR)
- Termini: Al-Haditha; Riyadh
- Stations: 16
- Website: www.sar.com.sa

Service
- Type: Freight
- Services: Riyadh–Qurayyat line
- Operator(s): Saudi Arabia Railways (SAR)
- Rolling stock: 25 EMD SD70ACS Locomotives

Technical
- Line length: 2,750 kilometres (1,708.8 mi)
- Track length: 2,750 kilometres (1,708.8 mi)
- Track gauge: 1,435 mm (4 ft 8 1/2 in) standard gauge
Route map
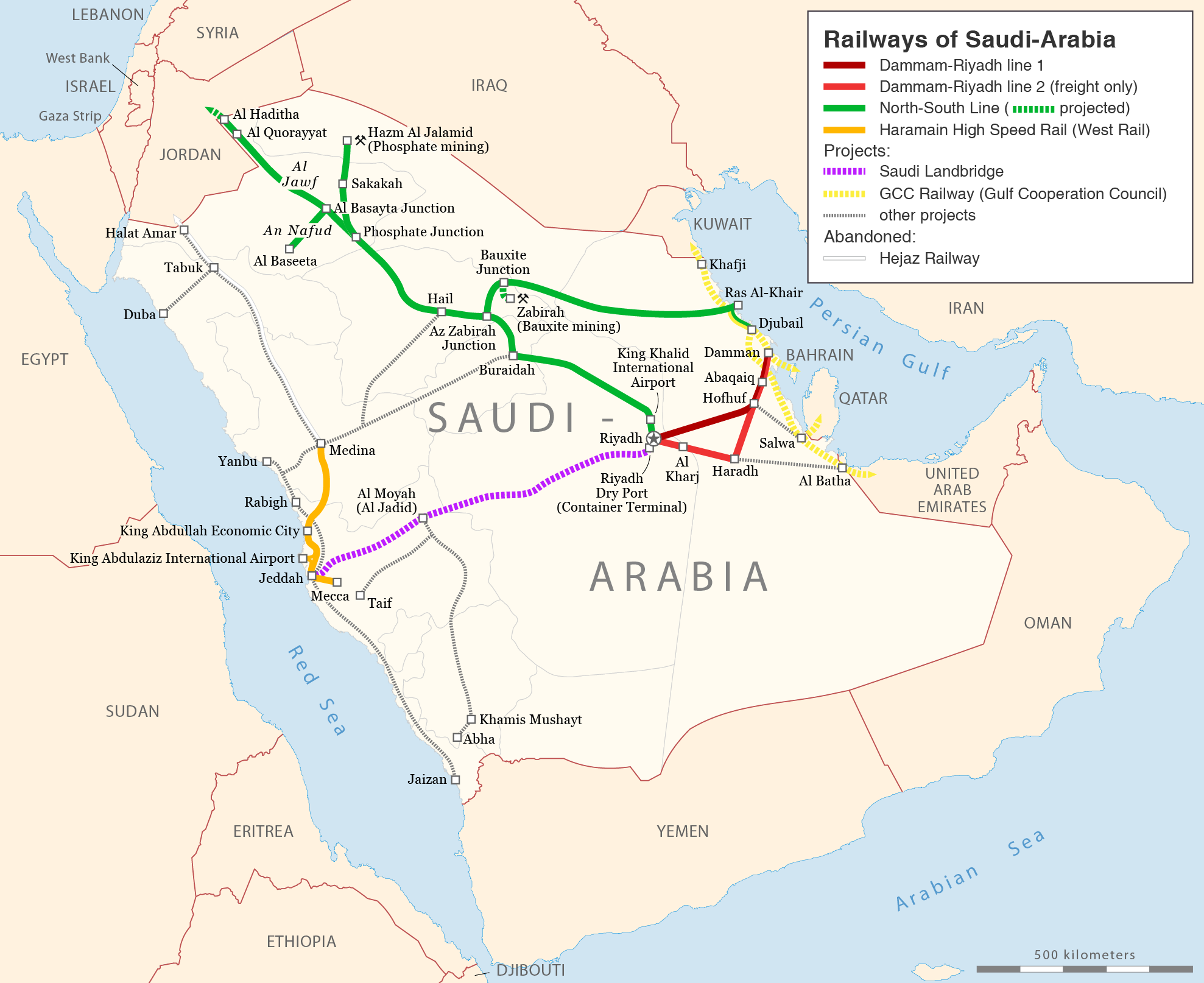

The North–South Railway line is a 2,750 km (1,709 mi) network of railway lines in central and eastern Saudi Arabia, built and operated by the Saudi Arabia Railways. The primary line of the network connects the capital of the kingdom, Riyadh, to the border with Jordan at Al-Haditha.

The line starts from Al-Jalamid mine which is located in the northeast in the Northern Territory, through Al-Jawf and Hail until arriving at the "AlBaithah railway junction" in the Qassim region. It then heads towards the southeast for processing and export facilities at Ras Al-Khair in the Eastern Province near Jubail. The line shares infrastructure with the Riyadh–Qurayyat line between Buraidah and Al Nafud. The line is a dedicated freight corridor, however, the Riyadh-Qurayyat Line operates only passenger services.

== Current rail service ==
The primary line shares infrastructure with the SAR Riyadh–Qurayyat line, and connects Riyadh to the border with Jordan at Al Haditha. Branch lines connect this main line to Ra's al-Khair (via Bauxite Junction), Hazm al-Jalamid (via Phosphate Junction), and Al Baseeta (via Al Baseeta Junction).

=== Stations ===
Province	Distance from Riyadh	City	Station	Additional connections
Northern Borders		Al-Haditha		Jordan
Northern Borders		Qurayyat		
Al-Jawf		Al-Baseetah Junction		Al-Baseetah
Al-Jawf		Phosphate Junction		Hazm al-Jalamid via Sakakah
Ha'il		Ha'il		
Ha'il		Al-Zabirah Junction		Ra's al-Khair and Al-Zabirah via Bauxite Junction
Qassim		Buraidah		
Riyadh		Riyadh	King Khalid Int'l Airport	
Riyadh	0.0 km	Riyadh	Riyadh	Dammam–Riyadh lines Planned: Saudi Landbridge

The operation on the 1,392 kilometres (865 mi) long freight part of the project connecting Al-Haditha and Jalamid with the new port city Ras Al-Khair was started in Jan 2015.

An 85 km link is planned which would connect the North–South railway with the port at Jubail.

=== Infrastructure ===
The first six of 25 EMD SD70ACS freight locomotives ordered in April 2009 were handed over to SAR at Port Dammam on 22 August 2010.

Passenger diesel push–pull trains made by Construcciones y Auxiliar de Ferrocarriles arrived in April 2015, and are designed to run at 200 km/h (125 mph) up to 55 degrees C. Each of the SAR trains includes a restaurant car, family zone and a prayer compartment, as well as both seating and sleeping cars. They are expected to run in formations of nine and 13 cars.

The north–south line uses the European ERTMS Level 2 signalling system; the largest use of the system in the world.

== See also ==
- Saudi Railways Organization (SRO)
- Saudi Railway Company (SAR)
- Transport in Saudi Arabia
