= Rail transport in Saudi Arabia =

Rail transport in Saudi Arabia النقل بالسكك الحديدية في السعودية
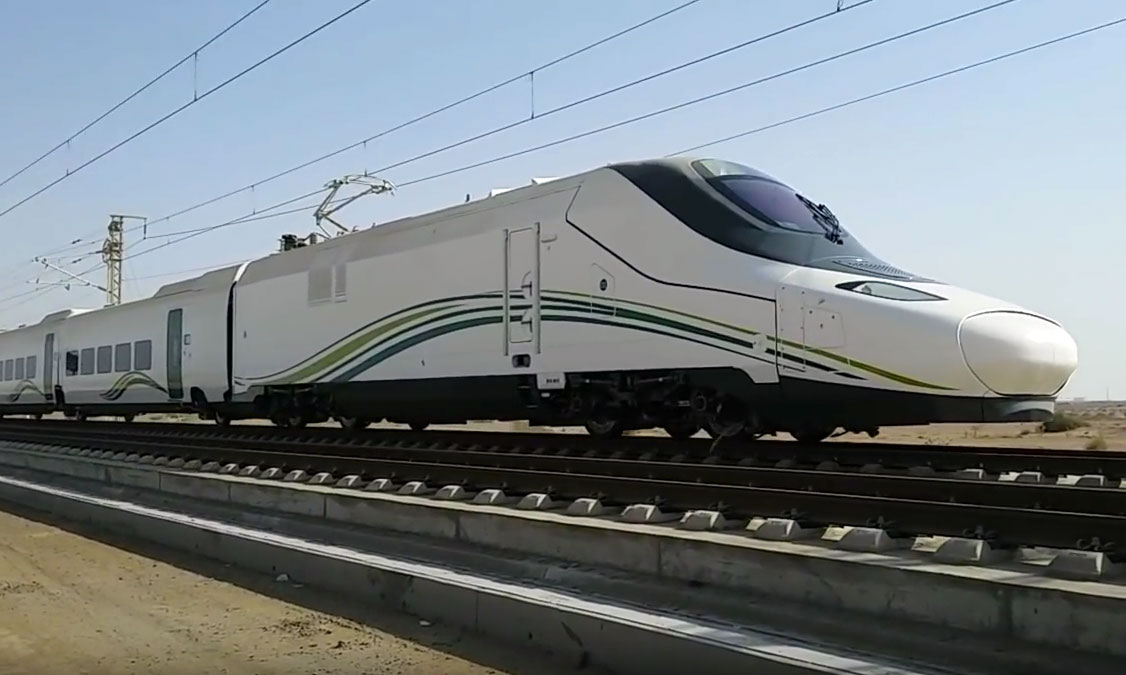
- Haramain High Speed Railway

Operation
- National railway: Saudi Arabia Railways

Track gauge
- Main: 1,435 mm (4 ft 8 1/2 in)

Features
Map
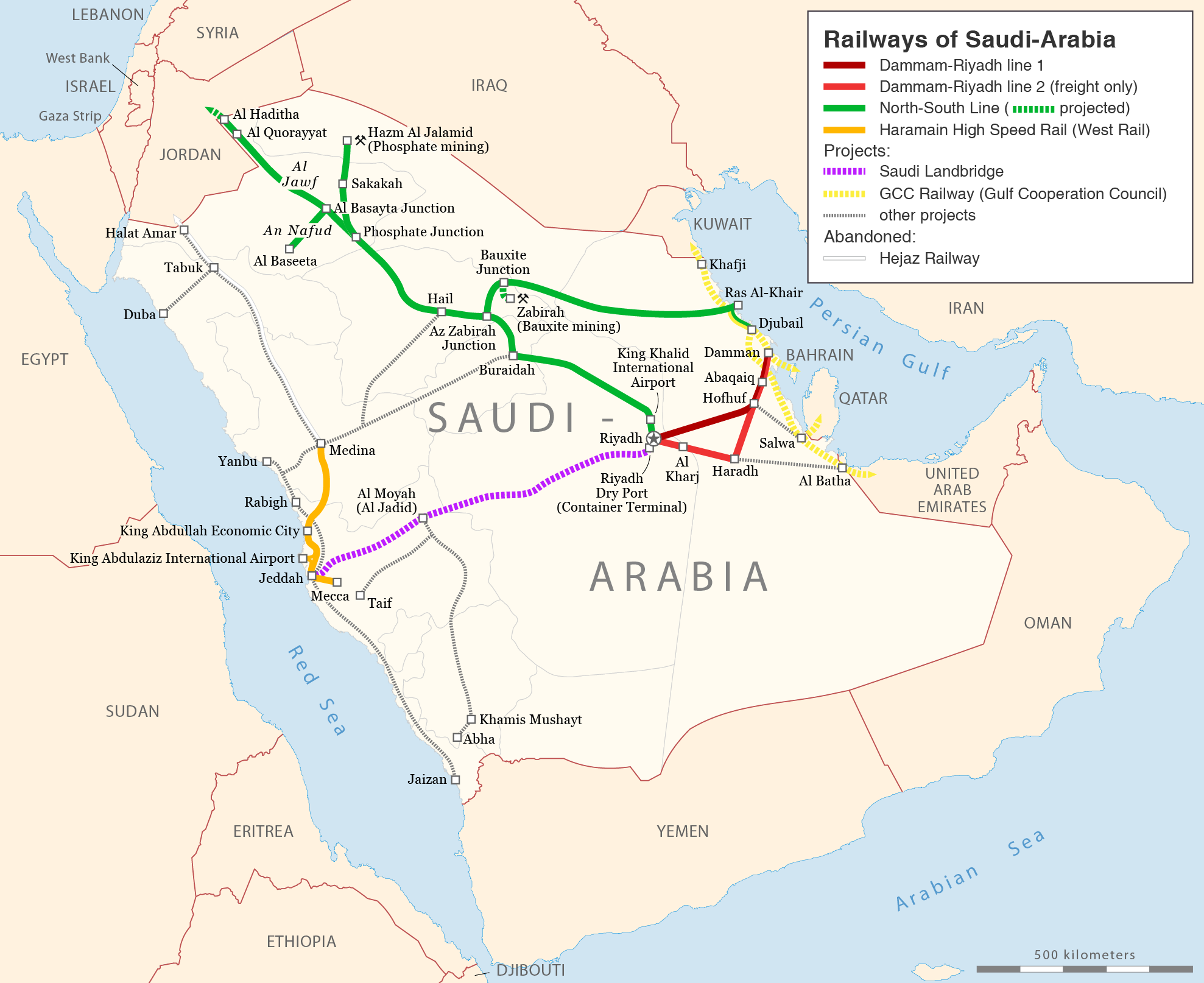
- Map of rail transport in Saudi Arabia as of 2009, including planned lines

Rail transport in Saudi Arabia is a growing sector of the country's transportation system, encompassing intercity, metro, and freight rail networks.

== History ==
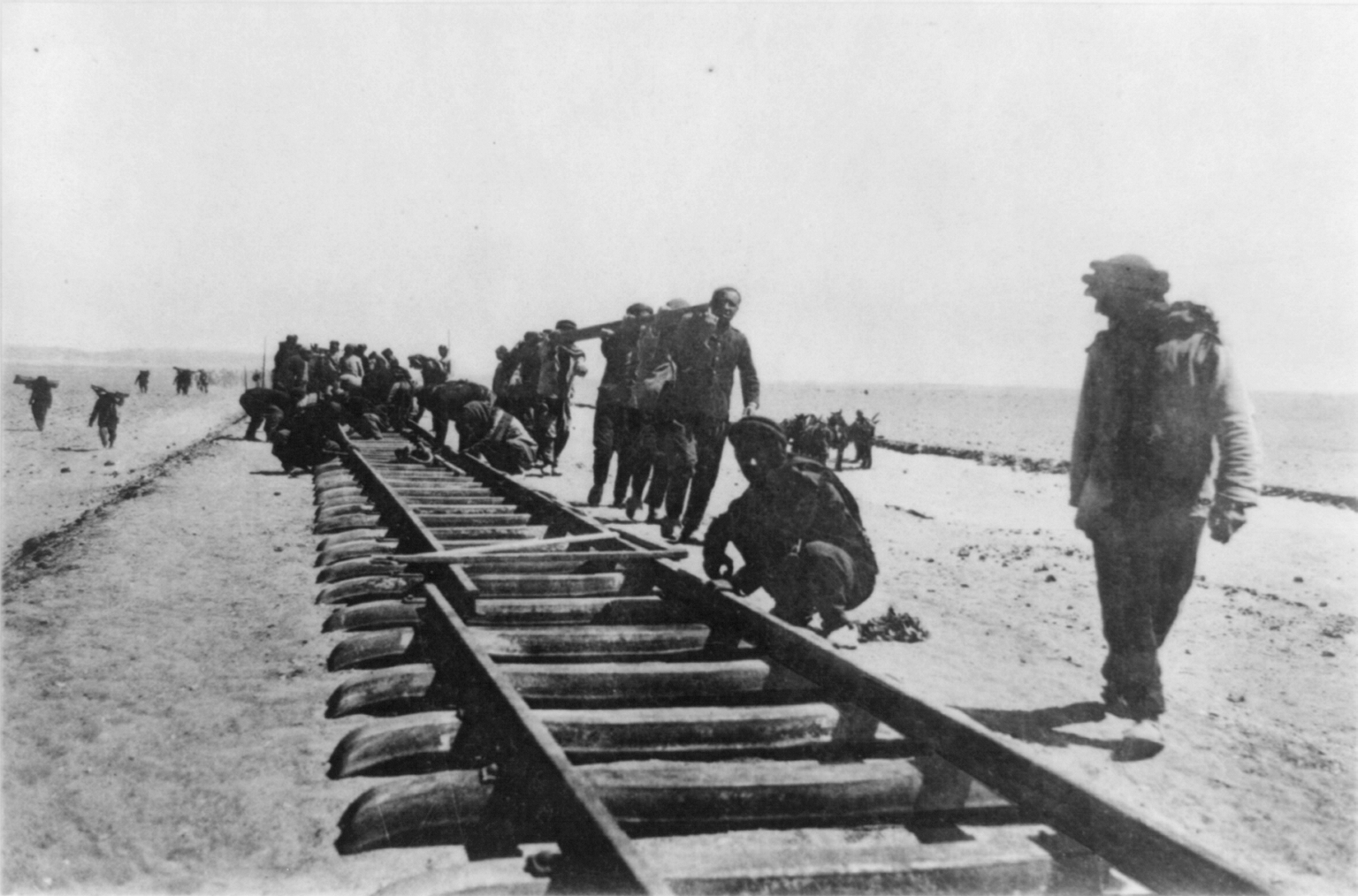
Workers laying track for the Hejaz railway near Tabuk in 1906

The first railway in the Arabian Peninsula was the Hejaz railway, constructed by the Ottoman Empire from Damascus to Medina. This 1,050 mm (3 ft 5 11/32 in) Narrow-gauge railway opened in 1908 but was closed in 1920 due to the Arab Revolt.

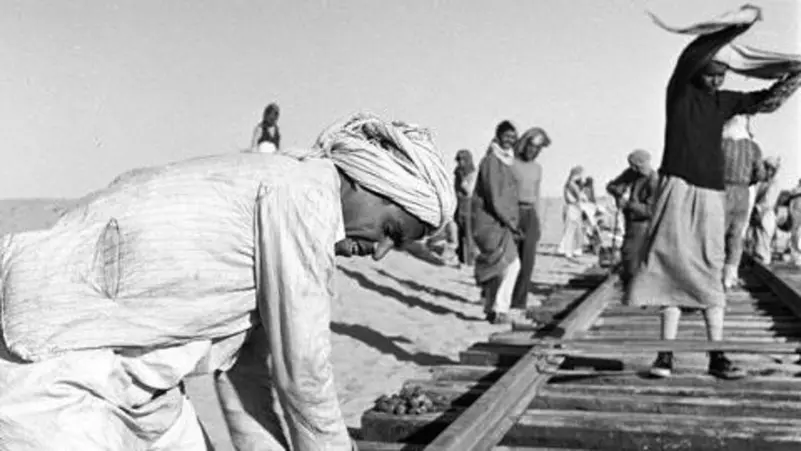
Construction of the Dammam–Riyadh railway in 1947

Modern railways were introduced in Saudi Arabia after World War II to transport goods for the Arabian American Oil Company, or Aramco (now Saudi Aramco), from ports on the Persian Gulf coast to warehouses in Dhahran. Construction began in September 1947, and the first line was inaugurated on 20 October 1951. Subsequent development projects included extending the line to Riyadh, building several passenger terminals, and opening a dry port in Riyadh.

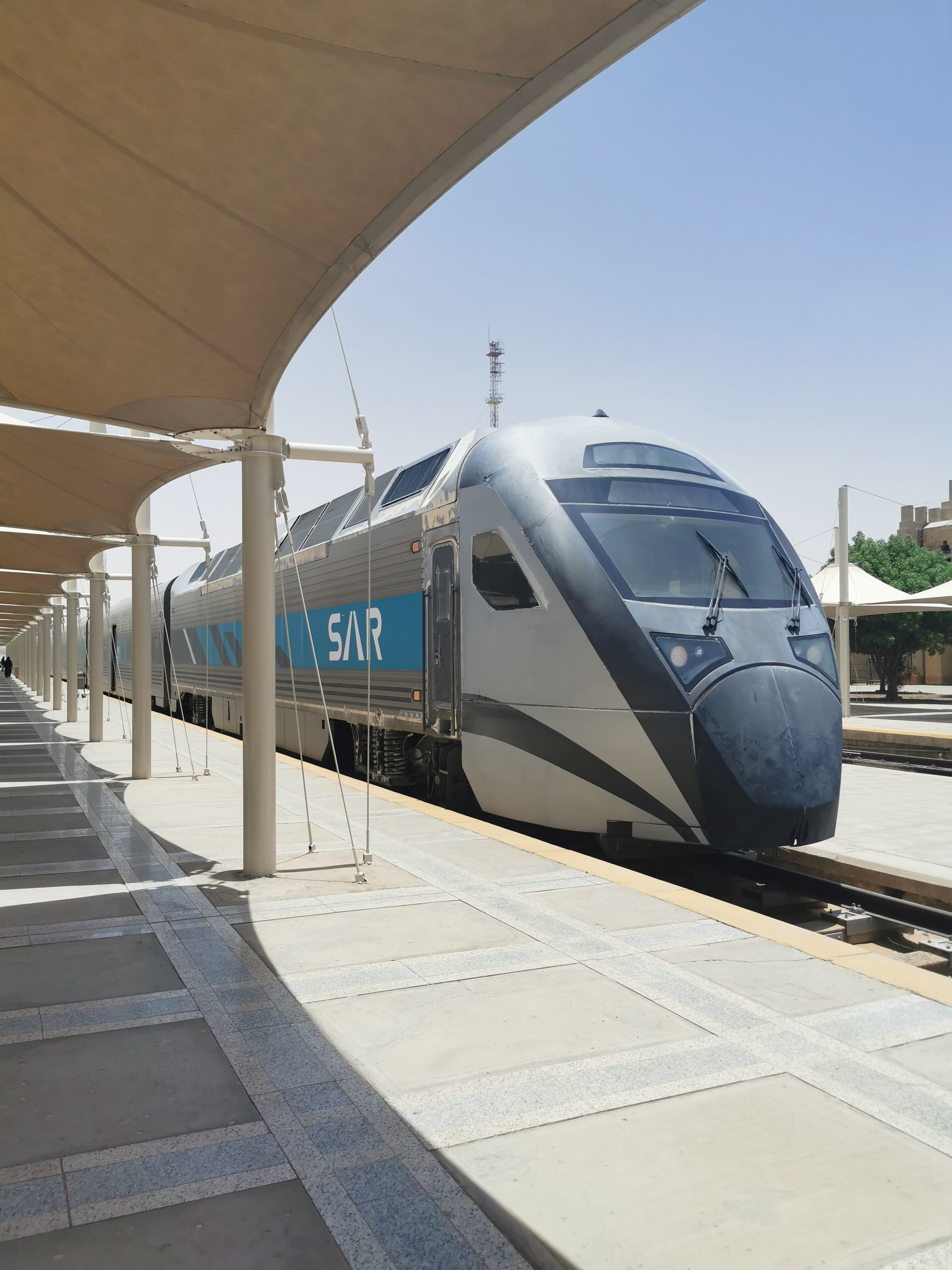
A Dammam–Riyadh railway train at Riyadh railway station

The Saudi Railways Organization was merged with the Saudi Railway Company to form the new Saudi Arabia Railways on 1 April 2021.

== National rail network ==
=== Passenger Network ===
West Train (Haramain High Speed Railway)

- Medina – King Abdullah Economic City – Jeddah – Mecca

North Train (Riyadh–Qurayyat railway)

- Riyadh – Majmaah – Hail – Al-Qassim – Al-Jouf – Qurayyat

A separate luxury service, the Dream of the Desert Train, also operates along this route.

East Train (Dammam–Riyadh railway)

- Dammam – Hofuf – Abqaiq – Riyadh

=== Freight Network ===
North–South railway
Primarily used for transporting minerals, phosphate, and industrial goods. Shares infrastructure with the Riyadh–Qurayyat railway.

Dammam–Riyadh railway
Used for bulk freight and container traffic between the eastern port of Dammam and Riyadh. branches with the Dammam–Riyadh passenger railway

Saudi Landbridge Project
Currently under development; planned to link the Red Sea port of Jeddah with Dammam to enable faster freight movement across the country.

== International rail links ==
- Saudi–Qatar High Speed Railway – A proposed high-speed railway connecting Saudi Arabia and Qatar.
- Gulf Railway – A proposed network linking the member states of the Gulf Cooperation Council.

== Metro systems ==
- Riyadh Metro – A rapid transit system serving the capital city, Riyadh.
- Mecca Metro – A seasonal metro system primarily serving pilgrims during the Hajj.
- Jeddah Metro – A proposed metro network intended to serve Jeddah.
- Medina Metro – A proposed metro network intended to serve Medina.
- Sharqia Metro – A proposed metro system planned for the Dammam metropolitan area.

== See also ==
- Ministry of Transport and Logistic Services
- Transport in Saudi Arabia
- Saudi Arabia Railways
