= Ras Al-Khair =

Town and port under development in Saudi Arabia

Coordinates: 27.514°N 49.184°E

Ras Al-Khair (Also called Ras Az-Zour, Ras Azzour) is a town and port currently under development in the Eastern Province of Saudi Arabia. It is on the eastern coast, over 100 km (61 mi) north of Jubail. It is also known under its project name of "Minerals Industrial City".

== Industry ==
The new city, RAZMIC (Ras Al Zour Mineral Industrial City), is planned to exploit the mineral deposites of phosphate and bauxite found within Saudi Arabia. Therefore, a di-ammonium phosphate (DAP) plant will be built, an aluminium smelter, an aluminium rolling mill, an ammonia plant, an alumina refinery and facilities to produce phosphoric and sulphuric acid. Power will be supplied by the 2,400 MW Ras Al-Khair Power and Desalination Plant.

The official ground breaking for the aluminium project by the Saudi Arabian Mining Company (MA'ADEN) and Alcoa was on 19 June 2010. The project was scheduled to be completed by 2014. Among other projects a residential village for the MAADEN employees was built with 500 housing units.

The King Salman Global Maritime Industries Complex is under construction in Ras Al-Khair, and will be the largest shipyard in the world when it is completed.

== Transportation ==
=== Airport ===
The town is served by King Fahd International Airport, the terminal is at a driving distance of 180 km (112 mi) to the south.

=== Rail ===
Ras Az-Zour will be linked by the Saudi Railways Organization to the bauxite mines at Zabirah with a new railway line branch of the North-South Project. Later the line will be extended to meet the line from Riyadh via Buraidah to Haditha at the so-called Zubairah Junction. As part of the Saudi Landbridge Project another line will connect the new port to Jubail and to Dammam. Thus Ras Al-Zour will be connected to the bauxite mine near Zabirah, the phosphate deposits near Jalamid and the agricultural center at Al-Basyata as well as to the oil processing facilities via the Jubail line.

=== Sea ===
The proposed seaport is thought to become a major export hub for aluminium products and ammonium phosphate.

== Renaming ==
In July 2011, King Abdullah changed the name of Ras Az-Zour to Ras Al-Khair (with Khair meaning light or bright to have a more positive naming), according to a statement by President of the Royal Commission for Jubail and Yanbu Prince Saud bin Abdullah bin Thunayan to the Saudi Press Agency on 6 July 2011.

== See also ==
- Khair
- Railway stations in Saudi Arabia
- Transport in Saudi Arabia
