= Riyadh North railway station =

Railway station in Riyadh, Saudi Arabia

Riyadh North Station

General information
- Location: Al Thumamah Road, King Khalid International Airport, 13422 Riyadh, Saudi Arabia
- Coordinates: 24.855658°N 46.764703°E
- Owner: Saudi Arabia Railways
- Line: Riyadh–Qurayyat line
- Platforms: 2

History
- Opened: 26 February 2017

Services
Preceding station	Saudi Arabia Railways	Following station
Majmaah towards Qurayyat	Riyadh–Qurayyat	Terminus
Location

Riyadh North Station or locally known by "Thumamah train station" is one of the two passenger railway stations in Riyadh, Saudi Arabia, along with Riyadh railway station. It is located near King Khalid airport at Thumamah road, and is the south terminus of the Riyadh–Qurayyat line that links the capital city of Riyadh with Al-Haditha land port at the Saudi-Jordanian border.

== See also ==
- List of railway stations in Saudi Arabia
