= Maaden (company) =

Saudi mining company

Saudi Arabian Mining Company (Ma'aden)
- Type: Public (mostly state-owned)
- Traded as: Tadawul: 1211
- ISIN: SA123GA0ITH7
- Industry: Exploration of mining sites, Gold, world-class phosphate, aluminium, industrial minerals and copper concentrate operations.
- Founded: March 23, 1997; 29 years ago
- Headquarters: Riyadh, Saudi Arabia
- Key people: Chairman: H.E. Yasir Bin Othman Al-Rumayyan; President, CEO: Robert Wilt (Bob)
- Products: Gold, Silver, Phosphate, Aluminum, Base metals
- Revenue: 38,600 million SAR (2025)
- Total assets: 97,657,597,000 Saudi riyal (2019)
- Owner: Public Investment Fund
- Number of employees: +8000 (2021)
- Website: www.maaden.com

Maʽaden (stylized MAADEN; Arabic: معادن), also known as the Saudi Arabian Mining Co., is a Saudi state-owned mining company headquartered in Riyadh. It was formed as a Saudi joint stock company on 23 March 1997 for the purpose of facilitating the development of Saudi Arabia's mineral resources. The Saudi government still owns 50% of its shares while the remaining 50% are listed in Tadawul (Stock Market). It is the largest mining company in Saudi Arabia.

Saudi Arabian Mining Company was ranked 24th on Forbes Middle East's Top 100 Listed Companies 2025 list.

== Corporate and subsidiaries ==
Subsidiaries
		Incorporated	Owned by Maaden (2015)
Ma'aden Gold and Base Metals Co	MGBM	9 August 1989	100%
Ma'aden Infrastructure Co	MIC	17 August 2008	100%
Ma'aden Industrial Minerals Co	IMC	31 March 2009	100%
Ma'aden Aluminum Co	MAC	10 October 2010	74.9%
Ma'aden Rolling Co	MRC	10 October 2010	74.9%
Ma'aden Bauxite and Alumina Co	MBAC	22 January 2011	74.9%
Ma'aden Phosphate Co	MPC	1 January 2008	70%
Ma'aden Wa'ad Al Shamal Phosphate Co	MWASPC	27 January 2014	60%
Sahara and Ma'aden Petrochemical Co	SAMAPCO	14 August 2011	50%
Ma'aden Barrick Copper Co	MBCC	2 November 2014	50%

Upon incorporation Maaden received 50% of the stock of the Saudi Mining Company for Precious Metals (renamed MGBM: Ma'aden Gold and Base Metals Company) from the government-owned Petromin Corporation. In 1999 the remaining 50% was acquired from the Swedish Boliden Mineral S.P. for SAR 26 million.

PIF owned all 400 million shares (par value SAR 10, issued at par) issued at incorporation. On 4 March 2007, capital was increased to 925 million shares (525 million issued at SAR 20) with PIF holding 462.5 million, GOSI (social insurance fund) and PPA (public pension agency) each holding 23.125 million and 416.25 offered in the 5 July 2008 IPO on the Tadawul. In November 2014 243 million additional shares were offered to existing shareholders at SAR 23 per share, for which Maaden raised SAR 5.674 billion. Of the proceeds 90% were allocated to MWAS (Ma'aden Wa'ad Al Shamal Phosphate Company) and 10% to MBAC and included the settlement of SAR 1,772 million of outstanding Murabaha short term loans.

In June 2019, Maaden obtained Alcoa's 25.1% stake in MRC without any direct compensation. Alcoa was released from future MRC lenders obligations. Alcoa's press release was also cryptic about the reasoning behind this apparent write-off.

In June 2018 PIF took over the GOSI and PPA shares and then owned 65.44%, the remainder being free float.

On 4 November 2019, 62 million shares were issued at SAR 48.08 (then current market value) to PIF in order to convert debt due to PIF to equity to improve the company's credit position.

On 30 May 2022, the common stock was split 2-for-1 (into 2,461 million shares). On 7 June 2023 the stock was split 3-for-2 (into 3,692 million shares).

Effective 24 December 2024, Maaden bought out Mosaic's 25% stake in MWSPC in exchange for 111 million newly issued Maaden common shares. Effective 24 June 2025 Maaden bought out Alcoa's 25.1% stake in MBAC and MAC, in exchange for SAR 562.5 million in cash and 86 million newly issued Maaden common shares (then valued SAR 3,562.5 million). The new total stock outstanding was then 3,889 million common shares. As a result of these capital increases, PIF's stake in the company was diluted from 67.18% to 65.22% to 63.78%.

== Aluminum ==
On 20 December 2009, Maʽaden signed an agreement with US aluminium giant Alcoa to build a greenfield $10.8-billion vertically integrated aluminum industry in Saudi Arabia. Under the agreement, the two firms built an aluminium refinery and a smelter in Ras Al-Zour. Three companies were created and owned 74.9% by Maaden and 25.1% by Alcoa: MBAC (Ma'aden Bauxite and Alumina Co) for bauxite mining and the alumina refinery, MAC (Ma'aden Aluminium Co) for the aluminum smelter and MRC (Ma'aden Rolling Co) for the sheet mill plant.

The 4 million mtpa bauxite mine at Ba'itha (27.6697°N 43.9976°E) began operations in May 2014 and was considered 95% completed in August 2014. It features a two-stage ore crusher. Three mining licenses totaling 97.76km^{2} have been granted for which SAR 10,000 per km^{2} is paid in rent each year. The total cost of the MBAC mine and alumina refinery was ca. SAR 13 billion. Reserves in 2015 were: 81.7Mt (million metric tons) measured, 141Mt indicated, 30.8Mt inferred, all figures for material with Total Available Alumina of ca. 50%. In terms of duration with production at 3.6 million tons per year, the capacity of the refinery: 23, 40 and 9 years.

Bauxite is transported via a branch of the North-South Railway, which was entirely funded by PIF. The freight line from the phosphate mine at Al-Jalamid, passing through the bauxite mine at Az Zabirah, has a length of 1,486km. The rail distance from the Baitha mine to Ras Al Khair is approximately 550km. The first phosphate was shipped from Al Jalamid to Ras al Khair in May 2011.

The alumina refinery uses the Bayer process and its two production trains have a capacity for 1.8 million mtpa. 250,000 tonnes of bauxite storage provide a 20 day buffer. The first earthworks for the plant started in 2011. The first alumina was produced 21 December 2014.

External videos
- MRC plant overview

The 740,000 mtpa smelter consisted of two potlines and an anode production plant. It was designed to consume 1.4 million mtpa of alumina. It produced its first hot metal on 12 December 2012 and produced 187,000 tonnes during the ramp up phase in 2013. The two potlines became fully operational in Q1 and Q2 of 2014. On site storage for 150,000 tonnes of alumina provide a 38 day buffer. The AP-30 pots operate above 400kA.

The SAR 2.2 billion contract for the rolling mill was let to Samsung Engineering in 2011 and The first concrete was poured within the year.

In June 2014 the first can sheet was rolled in the rolling mill (430,000 mtpa capacity) and in November 2014 the can recycling facility (180,000 mtpa capacity) produced the first metal.

Production ('000 metric tons)
Year	Bauxite	Alumina	Aluminum		Flat Rolled Products
			Total	Smelter	
2014	879	23	662		0
2015		846	839		59
2016		1,429	871		101
2017	3,708	1,484	916	762	152
2018		1,774	932		
2019		1,798	967		296
...
2024		1,840	984		
2025		1,888	997		
