= Ras Al-Khair Power and Desalination Plant =

Water and power plant in Saudi Arabia

- Country: Saudi Arabia
- Location: Ras Al-Khair
- Coordinates: 27°32′12″N 49°08′20″E
- Status: Operational
- Construction began: 2011
- Commission date: April 2014
- Construction cost: $7,100 million; 27,000 million SR (2011)
- Operator: Saudi Water Authority
- Employees: 3,500 (2014)
- Combined cycle?: Yes
- IWPP?: Yes
- IWPP purification method: Multi-stage flash distillation; reverse osmosis
- IWPP water output: 1,036,000 m^{3}/d (423,000 cu ft/ks)

Power generation
- Nameplate capacity: 2,400 MW

The Ras Al-Khair Power and Desalination Plant is a power and desalination plant located in Ras Al-Khair on the eastern coast of Saudi Arabia. It is operated by the Saline Water Conversion Corporation of Saudi Arabia. The plant began operating in April 2014 and, as of January 2017, is the world's largest hybrid water desalination plant. The project includes a power plant capable of producing 2400 MW of electricity. In 2015, it won the Global Water Awards "Desalination Plant of the Year" award.

== History ==
Construction of the plant began in 2011. Though originally slated to begin producing freshwater by the end of 2013, the first freshwater produced from the plant was in early 2015. Full commercial operation of the plant was achieved in March 2016.

The primary contractors for construction of the plant were the Doosan Group and Saudi Archirodon. Doosan was awarded the prime contract in September, 2010. Additional contractors for the plant included Fluid Equipment Development Company for energy recovery devices, Siemens for generators, turbines, and related equipment, and Hyosung for various motors.

The plant has created 3,500 direct and indirect jobs.

== Operation ==
Water intake for the plant comes from the Persian Gulf, on the shore of which the plant sits. The plant includes five high-efficiency gas turbines operated in combined cycle mode and in single mode. It uses a hybrid system of eight multi-stage flashing units and 17 reverse osmosis units. Freshwater output from the plant is pumped via pipelines to Riyadh and Hafr Al-Batin. Electricity and freshwater output from the plant also supply a nearby aluminium oxide refinery. Of the 2400 MW electricity produced by the plant, 200 MW are used by the plant itself. Effluent from the plant is processed locally by a dedicated wastewater treatment plant and discharged into the Persian Gulf.

== See also ==
- Desalination facilities
