= FEDCO =

FEDCO may refer to:

- Federal Employees' Distributing Company, Fedco.
- Fluid Equipment Development Company, FEDCO.
- Fedco Seeds, Inc.
- Fedco brand batter mixers, part of The Peerless Group.
- Fedco Electronics, Inc.
