= Saudi Arabia Railways =

National railway company of Saudi Arabia

Saudi Arabia Railways الخطوط الحديدية السعودية
- Logo used since 2021

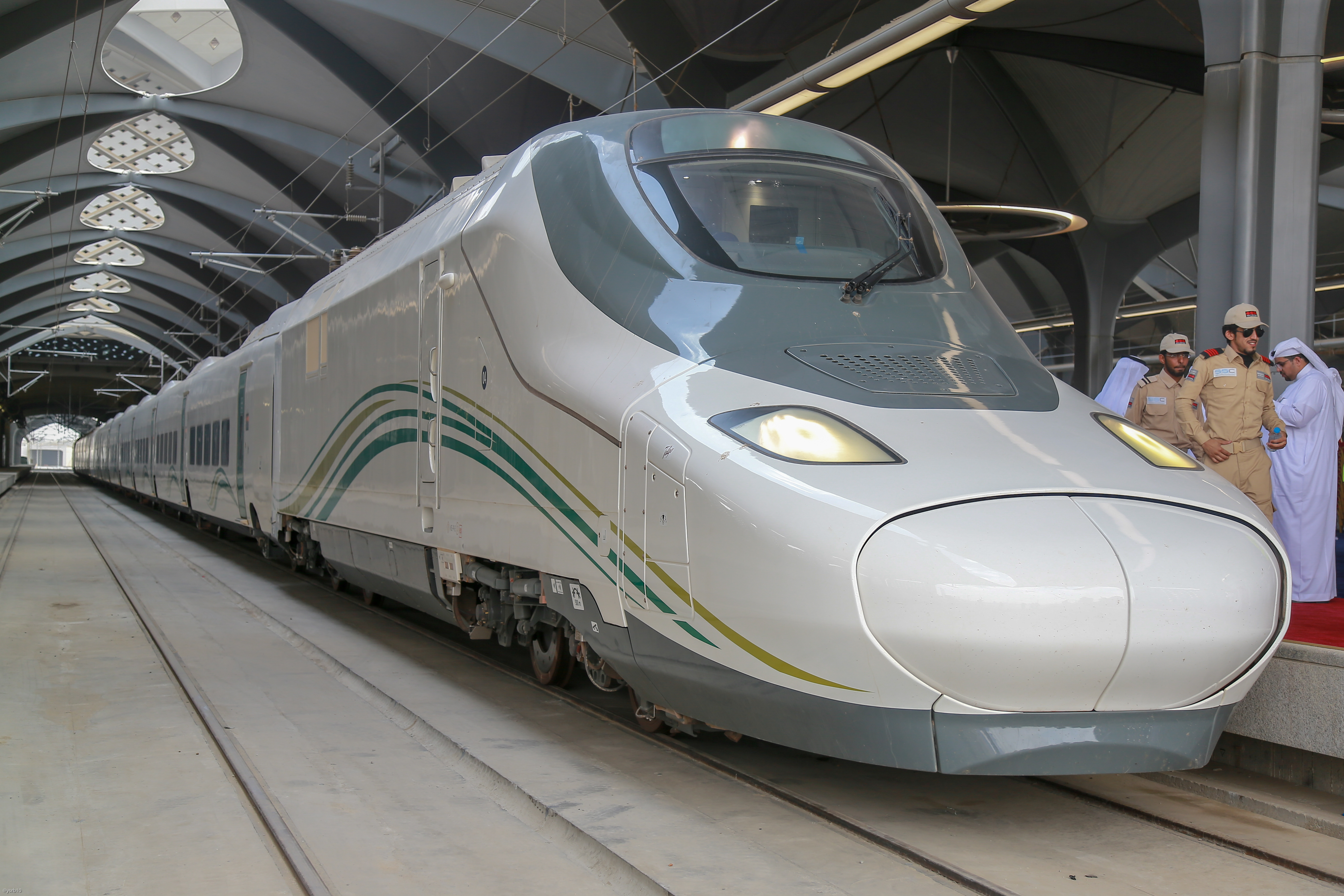
- Haramain High Speed Railway
- Formerly: Saudi Railway Company
- Industry: Rail transport
- Founded: 23 May 2006; 20 years ago 1 April 2021; 5 years ago (Current form)
- Headquarters: Diplomatic Quarter, Building S-24, Riyadh, Saudi Arabia
- Key people: Nabil Al-Amoudi (Chairman)
- Parent: Public Investment Fund
- Website: www.sar.com.sa

Saudi Arabia Railways (SAR) is the national railway company of Saudi Arabia. It is a state-owned enterprise, owned by the PIF.

== History ==
Saudi Arabia Railways, formerly known as the Saudi Railway Company, was established in 2006 to build, operate, and manage the North–South railway.

In February 2021, approval was granted to merge the Saudi Railways Organization and the Saudi Railway Company. The merger was completed on 1 April 2021, forming the unified national railway operator now known as Saudi Arabia Railways.

== Railways ==
=== Passenger Network ===
West Train (Haramain High Speed Railway)

- Medina – King Abdullah Economic City – Jeddah – Mecca

North Train (Riyadh–Qurayyat railway)

- Riyadh – Majmaah – Hail – Al-Qassim – Al-Jouf – Qurayyat

A separate luxury service, the Dream of the Desert Train, also operates along this route.

East Train (Dammam–Riyadh railway)

- Dammam – Hofuf – Abqaiq – Riyadh

=== Freight Network ===
North–South railway
Primarily used for transporting minerals, phosphate, and industrial goods. Shares infrastructure with the Riyadh–Qurayyat railway.

Dammam–Riyadh railway
Used for bulk freight and container traffic between the eastern port of Dammam and Riyadh. branches with the Dammam–Riyadh passenger railway

Saudi Landbridge Project
Currently under development; planned to link the Red Sea port of Jeddah with the Eastern Province to enable faster freight movement across the country.

== Rolling stock ==
=== Electric and diesel trainsets ===
Class	Image	Top speed		Number	Remarks	Built
Class	Image	mph	km/h	Number	Remarks	Built
Talgo 350		220	350	36 trainsets: 72 power cars; 72 semi-articulated trailer cars; 396 articulated trailer cars	Electric trainsets with 2 locomotive-like power cars, two semi-articulated end trailer cars and 11 articulated trailer passenger cars (Mc-T=11Ta=T-Mc). Including 35 regular passenger trains and 1 VIP train for royal family and officials. Operating on the Haramain High Speed Railway with 25 kV AC railway electrification.	2014-2018
SAR-200 CAF push–pull train		124	200	6 trainsets: 12 power cars, 62 trailer cars	Diesel-electric trainsets with 2 locomotive-like power cars and 9 or 13 trailer cars (four standard day trains with Mc-9T-Mc formation and two sleeper night trains with Mc-13T-Mc formation). Operating on the Riyadh-Qurayyat Line.	2013
SRO-180 CAF push–pull train		112	180	8 trainsets: 10 power cars (5001-5010); 32 trailer intermediate cars; 8 trailer control cars	Diesel-electric trainsets with 1 locomotive-like power car, 4 intermediate trailer cars and 1 control car (Mc-4T-Tc formation). Two additional power cars built as reserves. Operating on the Dammam–Riyadh line.	2011

=== Diesel locomotives ===
Class	Image	Top speed		Number	Remarks	Built
Class	Image	mph	km/h	Number	Remarks	Built
EMD SD70ACS				61	Heavy haul AC diesel-electric locomotives for a mineral railway.	2010–2016
ALCO RS-1		65	105	6	Series 1000–1005 Diesel-electric locomotives. Originally Arabian American Oil Company A11x50-A11x51, 1002–1005.	1947–1951
EMD SW1001				5	Series 1022–1026 Order 818000 1/5 Diesel-electric locomotives.	1981
NS Class 2400 (1954)		50	80	7	Secondhand Diesel-electric locomotives taken over from NS by Volker Stevin in 1976 for construction works for a seaport in Jubail. Former 2427, 2445, 2485, 2497, 2499, 2519, 2523. Renumbered into 101-107. Sold to Archirodon for rail reconstruction between Damman and Riyadh and renumbered to 276-04–276-09. Some scrapped in 1983. Others active until 1994 and stored in Hofuf afterwards.	1954–1956
EMD G18				16	Series 1006–1021 Orders 710971–710975, 713081–713082, 713233–713235, and 748005 1/6 Diesel-electric locomotives.	1968–1976
EMD GP18M				1	Series 1200 Order 700178; Diesel-electric locomotives. rated at 1500 horsepower.	1961
EMD FP7A				2	Series 1500–1501 Order 7019; Diesel-electric locomotives taken over from Arabian American Oil Company (their 1006–1007).	1953
EMD FP9A				7	Series 1502–1508 Orders 701553, 701493–701494, 702272–702275; Diesel-electric locomotives.	1956–1959
EMD GP38-2				1	Series 2000. Order 712783; Diesel-electric locomotives.	1973
EMD GPL38S				7	Series 2001–2007. Order 201288865; Diesel-electric locomotives.	2015
EMD GT22CW				3	Series 2001–2003. Order 748004; Diesel-electric locomotives.	1976
EMD SDL38-2				6	Series 2004–2009. Order 778050; Diesel-electric locomotives.	1978
EMD SDL38				6	Series 2030–2035. Order 20148061; Diesel-electric locomotives.	2016
EMD SDL50				31	Series 3500–3530; Diesel-electric locomotives.	1981–2005
EMD GT46ACS				17	Series 4300–4316. Orders 20118517 and 20148134; Diesel-electric locomotives	2013–2015
Class 319.2		75	120	>4	Diesel-electric locomotives bought second hand.	
CRRC Qishuyan SDD17		62	100	8	Diesel-electric locomotives. Ordered in December 2014 for the Dammam–Riyadh line, first 2 locomotives delivered in July 2015.	2015–201?

== See also ==
- Transport in Saudi Arabia
- Rail transport in Saudi Arabia
- Ministry of Transport and Logistic Services
