= Riyadh–Qurayyat railway =

Riyadh–Qurayyat railway سكة حديد الرياض – القريات
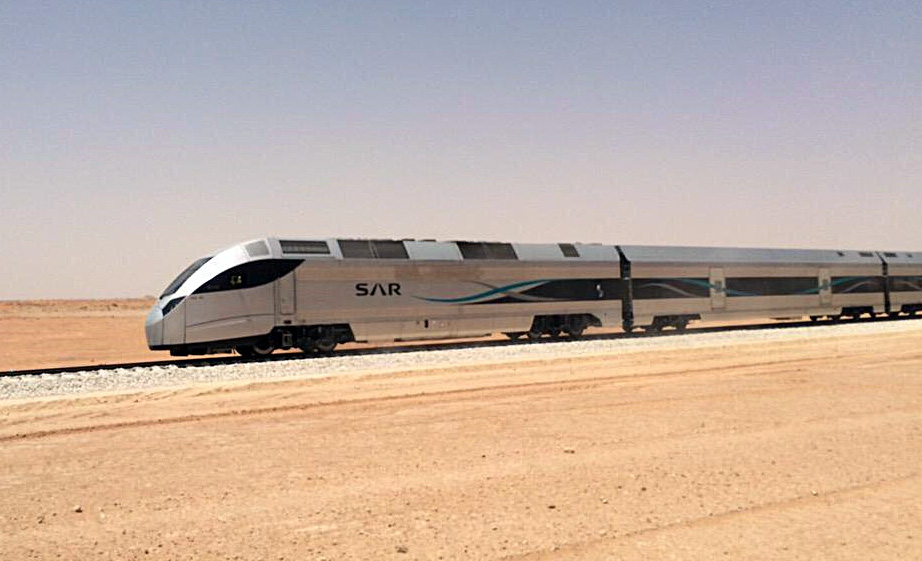

Overview
- Other name(s): Riyadh–Qurayyat train Riyadh–Qurayyat line North–South line
- Status: Operating
- Owner: Saudi Arabia Railways
- Locale: Al-Jouf Province; Hail Province; Al-Qassim Province; Riyadh Province
- Termini: Riyadh North railway station; Qurayyat railway station
- Stations: 6
- Website: SAR Official website

Service
- Type: Inter-city rail
- Rolling stock: CAF Diesel Push–pull train

History
- Opened: 26 February 2017

Technical
- Line length: 1,242 km (772 mi)
- Number of tracks: 1
- Track gauge: 1,435 mm (4 ft 8 1/2 in) standard gauge
- Electrification: None
- Operating speed: 200 km/h (125 mph)
Route map
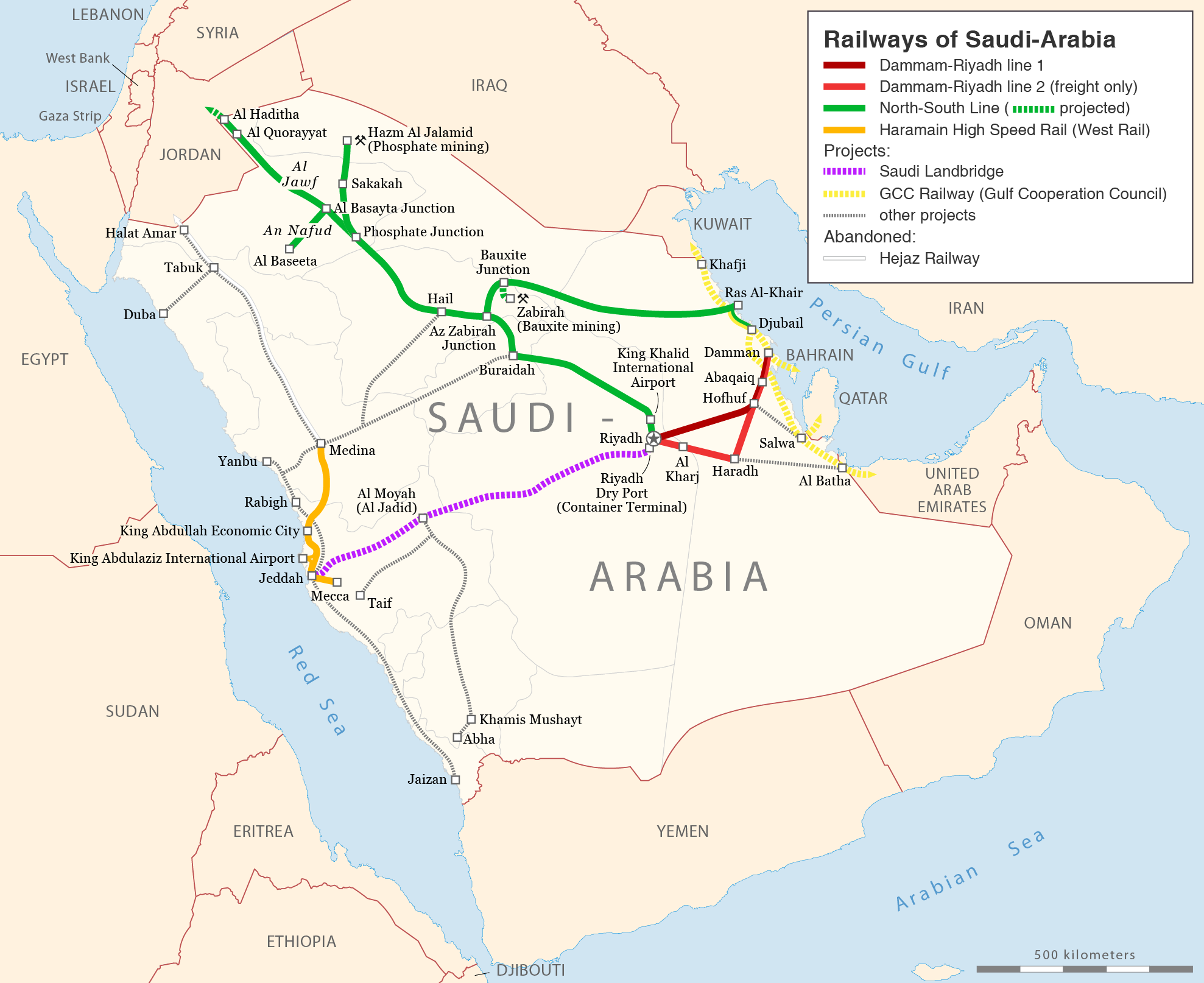

The Riyadh–Qurayyat railway is a passenger railway line in Saudi Arabia, owned and operated by Saudi Arabia Railways (SAR). The line is 1,242 km (772 mi) long and connects the capital, Riyadh, with the northern city of Qurayyat, near the Jordanian border.

The route includes stations in Majmaah, Al-Qassim Province, Hail Province, and Al-Jouf Province, with a planned stop at Al-Zulfi. Between Buraydah and the Nafud desert, the line shares infrastructure with the North–South railway, a freight railway primarily used for cargo operations.

== History ==
The Riyadh–Qurayyat railway, owned and operated by Saudi Arabia Railways (SAR), was built at an estimated cost of 20 billion Saudi riyal. In March 2012, the Saudi Railways Organization (SRO) signed a 553 million Saudi riyal contract with the Spanish company CAF to design and manufacture six 200 km/h diesel push-pull trains. CAF delivered the first train to SRO in September 2015.

Trial runs were conducted in 2016 between Riyadh North railway station and Majmaah railway station, as well as along sections to Al-Qassim railway station, Hail railway station, and Al-Jouf railway station. Passenger services between Riyadh and Al-Qassim commenced on 26 February 2017. The line was later extended to Qurayyat railway station in 2022.

In 2021, the Saudi Railways Organization merged into the Saudi Railway Company to form Saudi Arabia Railways (SAR), combining passenger and cargo operations under a single national railway company. In 2025, a new station at Al-Zulfi the Al-Zulfi railway station was announced, expanding the railway's service in Riyadh Province.

== Stations ==
The Riyadh–Qurayyat line has six operational stations and one planned station:

#	Station name	City	Province	Opening date	Ref
1	Riyadh North railway station	Riyadh	Riyadh Province	26 February 2017	
2	Majmaah railway station	Majmaah	Riyadh Province	26 February 2017	
3	Al-Qassim railway station	Buraydah	Al-Qassim Province	2017	
4	Hail railway station	Hail	Hail Province	23 November 2017	
5	Al-Jouf railway station	Sakaka	Al-Jouf Province	7 November 2018	
6	Qurayyat railway station	Qurayyat	Al-Jouf Province	31 March 2022	
7	Al-Zulfi railway station	Al-Zulfi	Riyadh Province	Planned	

== See also ==
- Saudi Arabia Railways
- Transport in Saudi Arabia
- Rail transport in Saudi Arabia
