= Zabirah =

Locality in northern Saudi Arabia

Coordinates: 28°02′50″N 43°41′09″E

Zabirah is a locality in northern Saudi Arabia.

== Transport ==
There are bauxite deposits in the vicinity, which is reason for proposed construction of a branch railway to serve mining.

== See also ==
- Railway stations in Saudi Arabia
