= EMD GP38-2 =

Model of North American diesel-electric locomotive

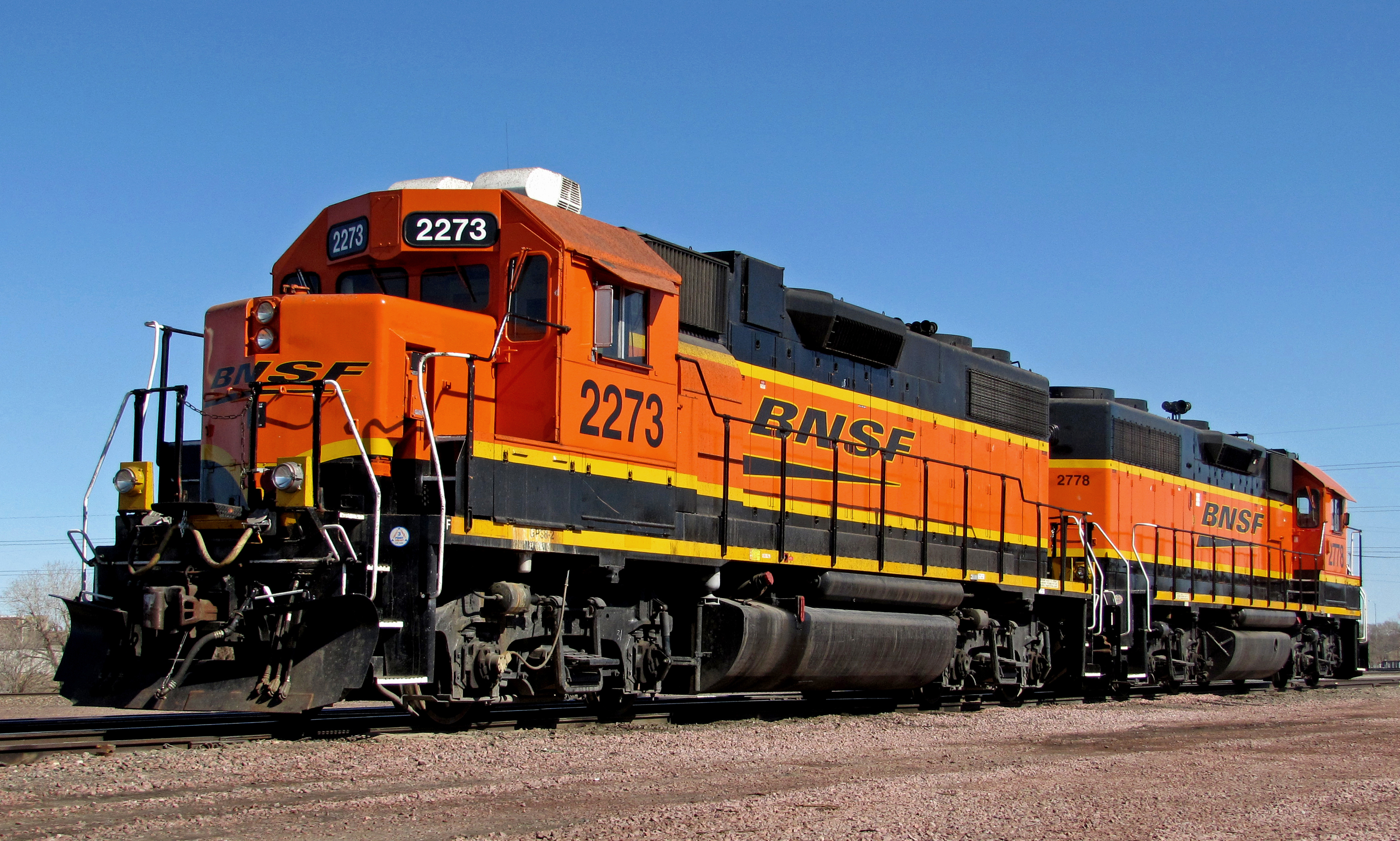
- BNSF Railway GP38-2s #2273 and #2778 in Lincoln, Nebraska
Type and origin
- Power type: Diesel-electric
- Builder: United States - Electro-Motive Diesel (EMD); Canada - General Motors Diesel (GMD)
- Model: GP38-2 GP38-2W
- Build date: January 1972–July 1986
- Total produced: 2,264
Specifications
- Configuration
  - AAR: B-B
  - UIC: Bo'Bo'
- Gauge: 4 ft 8 1/2 in (1,435 mm) standard gauge
- Length: 59 ft 2 in (18.03 m)
- Width: 10 ft 4.5 in (3.16 m)
- Height: 15 ft 4 in (4.67 m)
- Loco weight: 250,000 lb (113,400 kg)
- Prime mover: EMD 16-645E
- Engine type: V16 Two-stroke diesel
- Aspiration: Roots-type blower
- Alternator: AC alternator,
- Traction motors: DC traction motors
- Cylinders: 16
- Transmission: diesel electric
- Loco brake: Straight air, Dynamic
Performance figures
- Maximum speed: 65 mph (105 km/h)
- Power output: 2,000 hp (1.49 MW)
- Tractive effort: Starting: 61,000 lbf (271 kN) at 20% Continuous: 54,700 lbf (243 kN) and 11.1 mph (17.9 km/h)
Career
- Locale: North America, Saudi Arabia, México
- Disposition: Most still in service as of 2019

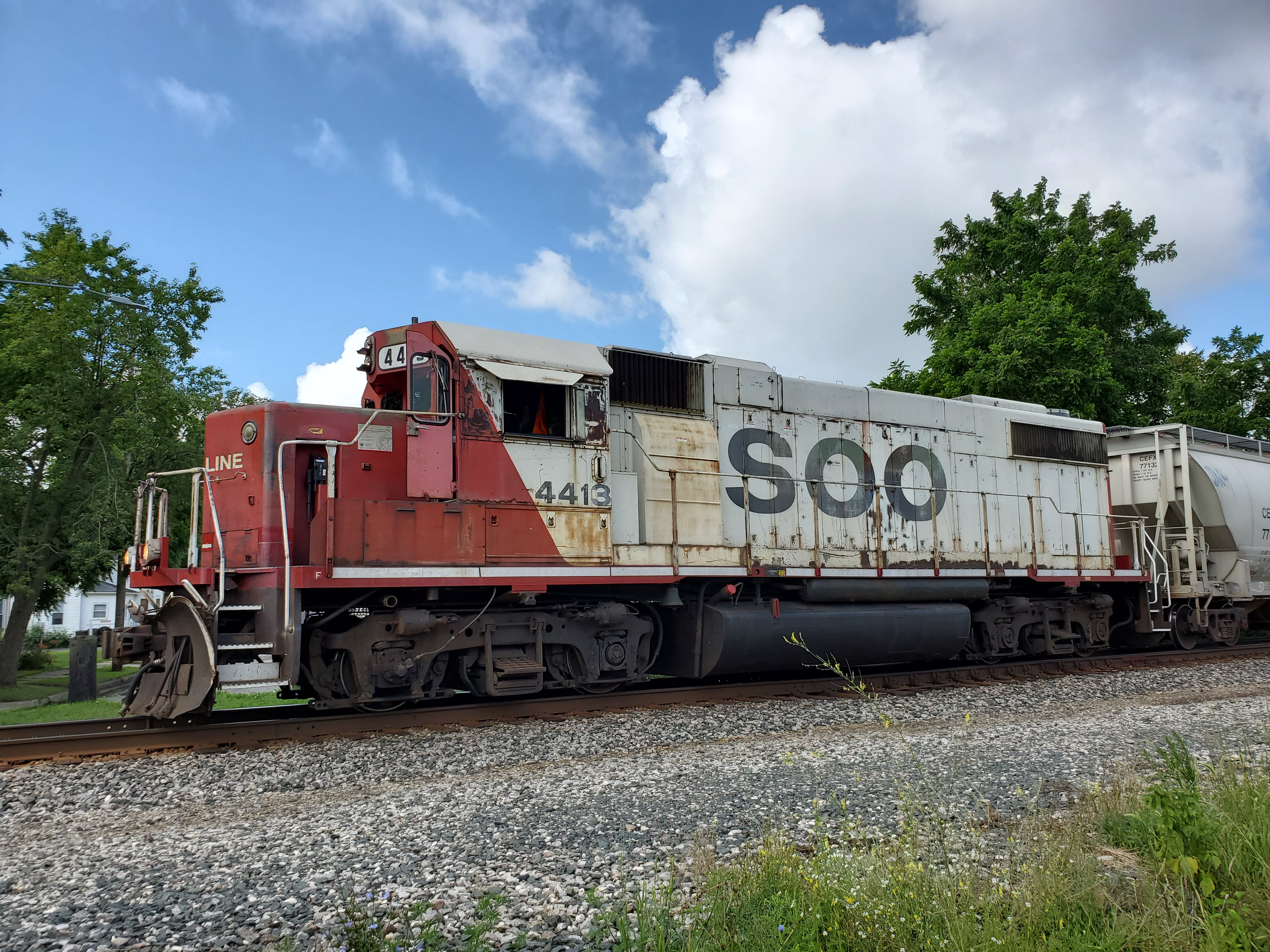
Soo Line 4413 in Oconomowoc, Wisconsin

The EMD GP38-2 is an American four-axle diesel-electric locomotive built by General Motors, Electro-Motive Division. Part of the EMD Dash 2 line, the GP38-2 was an upgraded version of the earlier GP38. Power is provided by an EMD 645E 16-cylinder engine, which generates 2,000 horsepower (1.5 MW).

== GP38-2W ==
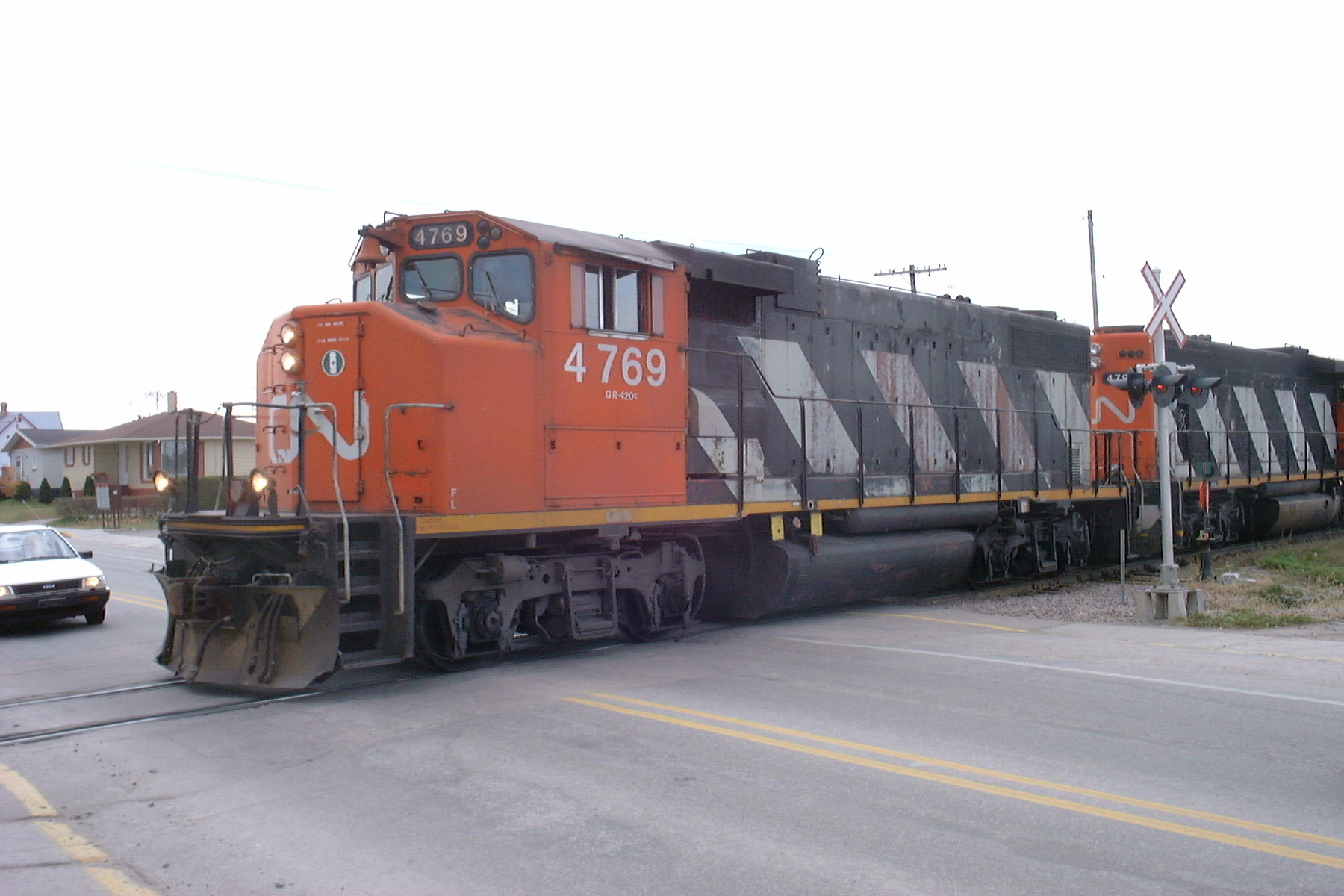
Canadian National 4769, a GMD GP38-2, with a CN-spec comfort cab in Saint-Félicien, Quebec

The GP38-2W is a Canadian variant of the GP38-2. It is easily distinguished by its wide-nose Canadian comfort cab. 51 of these locomotives were produced for the Canadian National Railway during 1973–1974.

Although a W is commonly suffixed to the name, it is actually an addition by enthusiasts to help specify the presence of a CN-spec comfort cab. No locomotives built using CN's design of comfort cab ever featured a W in their designation, as the presence of the cab did not mechanically alter the locomotive. This is reflected by the lack of the "W" in the model designation on the builders' plates of these units.

Compared to a standard GP38-2, the electrical cabinet air filter box and equipment blower duct behind the cab are different, the end platforms feature anticlimbers and vertical steps, and there are snow shields above the inertial-filter central air intakes behind the cab (added by CN some time after construction). They are otherwise largely the same as a GP38-2.

== Original buyers ==
1,851 examples of this locomotive model were built for American railroads and industrial concerns, 206 for Canadian railroads and industrials, 156 for Mexican railroads and industrials, and 1 export unit for the Saudi Railways Organization. A total of 51 GP38-2s were built with high-short-hoods containing steam generators for passenger service on Mexican railways. In addition, all 257 of Southern Railway's GP38-2s had Southern's "standard" high-short-hoods.

Railroad	Quantity	Road numbers	Notes
Angelina and Neches River Railroad	1	2000	
The American Rolling Mill Company	1	B-84	
Atlanta and West Point Railroad	2	6007–6008	Family Lines paint. To Seaboard System Railroad.
Atlanta and St. Andrews Bay Railroad	3	508–510	
Belt Railway of Chicago	6	490–495	
Boston and Maine Railroad	12	201–212	212 was renumbered 200 as a bicentennial unit.
Burlington Northern Railroad	37	2078–2109, 2150–2154	2150-2154 assigned to Fort Worth & Denver. Most passed on to BNSF Railway.
Butte, Anaconda and Pacific Railway	2	108–109	
Chicago and North Western Railway	35	4600–4634	Ordered by Rock Island. To Union Pacific Railroad.
Chicago South Shore and South Bend Railroad	10	2000–2009	
Cleveland Electric Illuminating Company	9	100–108	
Clinchfield Railroad	8	6000–6006, 6045	Family Lines paint. To Seaboard System.
Colorado and Wyoming Railway	2	2001–2002	
Conrail	119	8163–8281	All units were renumbered when divided between CSX Transportation and Norfolk Southern Railway.
Curtis, Milburn and Eastern Railroad	4	810, 817-819	
Detroit, Toledo and Ironton Railroad	8	221–228	228 was renumbered 1776 for the bicentennial. Renumbered GTW 6221–6228 in 1984–85.
Durham and Southern Railway	4	2000–2003	To Seaboard Coast Line Railroad 556–559.
Elgin, Joliet and Eastern Railway	5	700–704	All to Birmingham Southern Railroad. 703 re-purchased in the 90s and assigned to Waukegan.
Florida East Coast Railway	11	501–511	
Georgia Railroad	4	6009–6010, 6051–6052	Family Lines paint. To Seaboard System
Grand Trunk Western Railroad	25	5812–5836	
Gulf, Mobile and Ohio Railroad	15	740–754	To Illinois Central Gulf Railroad. 9560–9574
Illinois Central Gulf Railroad	40	9600–9639	
Illinois Terminal Railroad	4	2001–2004	to Norfolk and Western Railroad 4160-4163, then to Norfolk Southern Railroad same numbers.
Kansas City Southern Railway	12	4000–4011	
Lehigh Valley Railroad	12	314–325	To the Delaware and Hudson Railway upon creation of Conrail as 7314–7325. Briefly renumbered to 220-231 during the Guilford ownership of the D&H, upon emergence from Guilford renumbered to 7303–7312.
Long Island Rail Road	28	250–277	251 cab unit serves as a simulator at the Railroad Museum of Long Island. 261, 268, 270–271 to New York and Atlantic Railway. Delivered in Long Island bicentennial scheme.
Louisville and Nashville Railroad	129	4050–4144, 6011-6044	6011-6044 Family Lines paint. To Seaboard System.
Milwaukee Road	16	350–365	To Soo Line Railroad.
Mississippi Export Railroad	2	65–66	
Missouri–Kansas–Texas Railroad	18	304–321	319-321 has dynamic brakes To Union Pacific Railroad.
Missouri Pacific Railroad	274	858–959, 2111–2237, 2290–2334	To Union Pacific Railroad.
Penn Central Transportation Company	223	7940–8162	To Conrail, same numbers.
Phelps Dodge	8	1–4, 9, 55, 56, 58	
Pittsburgh and Lake Erie Railroad	6	2051–2056	
Providence and Worcester Railroad	4	2006–2009	
Public Service Company of Indiana	2	WG1-WG2	Lettered for AMAX Coal.
Rock Island Line	68	4300–4355, 4368-4379	Acquired by GTW, MP and P&LE upon dissolution of Rock Island.
San Manuel Arizona Railroad	2	16–17	
Seaboard Coast Line Railroad	74	500–555, 6046–6050, 6053-6065	6046–6050, 6053-6065 Family Lines paint. To Seaboard System.
Soo Line Railroad	53	790–799, 4410–4452	790–799 renumbered 4400–4409 soon after delivery.
South East Coal Company	3	3821–3823	
Southern Railway	257	5000–5256	High-short-hoods. To Norfolk Southern. 23 rebuilt with an Admiral Cab. (Note: The Admiral Cab was designed by Norfolk Southern for narrow-nose and low-hood cabs that retains the look of a standard EMD cab, the exceptions being sharper angles, angled center windows, raised numberboard section, under-floor air conditioning, and the nose being made of one inch thick steel instead of the quarter inch steel of the original EMD cab.) 50 to be sold at auction on August 18, 2016. 5076 sold to Northwestern Pacific in 2017.
Southern Pacific Railroad	45	4800–4844	
St. Louis–San Francisco Railway	116	400–478, 663–699	To Burlington Northern Railroad.
Texas Mexican Railway	7	861–867	867 was the last La Grange-built GP38-2 in May '85. All others built at GMDD London, Ont.
Toledo, Peoria and Western Railway	11	2001–2011	All went to Santa Fe then were divided up, with some going to BNSF after merger and others to KCS.
Union Pacific Railroad	60	2000–2059	
Vermont Railway	2	201–202	
Locomotives built by GMD, London, Ontario
Algoma Central Railway	6	200-205	
Canadian National Railway	60	5500–5559	23 renumbered to the 200 series when converted to hump mothers in 1978, these plus one additional renumbered to 7500-7526 (not all #'s used) in 1985. Three more, 7528, 7530, 7532 renumbered in 1990. The balance of these units became 4700–4732 in 1988. Units 4702 and 4728 rebuilt to GP40-3 and repainted to heritage schemes.
Canadian National Railway	51	5560–5610	GP38-2W's. Renumbered 4760–4810 in 1988. 5586 destroyed in the Hinton train collision of 1986.
Canadian Pacific Railway	115	3021–3135	The 3086-3135 were the last GP38-2's built by GMD, between March and July 1986.
Devco Railway	13	216–228	
Ontario Northland Railway	10	1800–1809	
Texas Gulf Sulphur	2	054–055	
Export locomotives built by EMD for other railroads
Altos Hornos de México	6	141, 145, 157–158, 167-168	
Ferrocarril Chihuahua al Pacífico	12	900-911	910 & 911 have high-short-hoods containing steam generators.
Ferrocarriles Nacionales de México	124	9200–9299, 9400–9414, 9901-9909	9200-9219 & 9901-9909 have high-short-hoods containing steam generators.
Ferrocarriles Unidos del Sureste	14	514–521, 528-533	
Saudi Railways Organization	1	2000	
Totals	2,264		

== Rebuilds ==
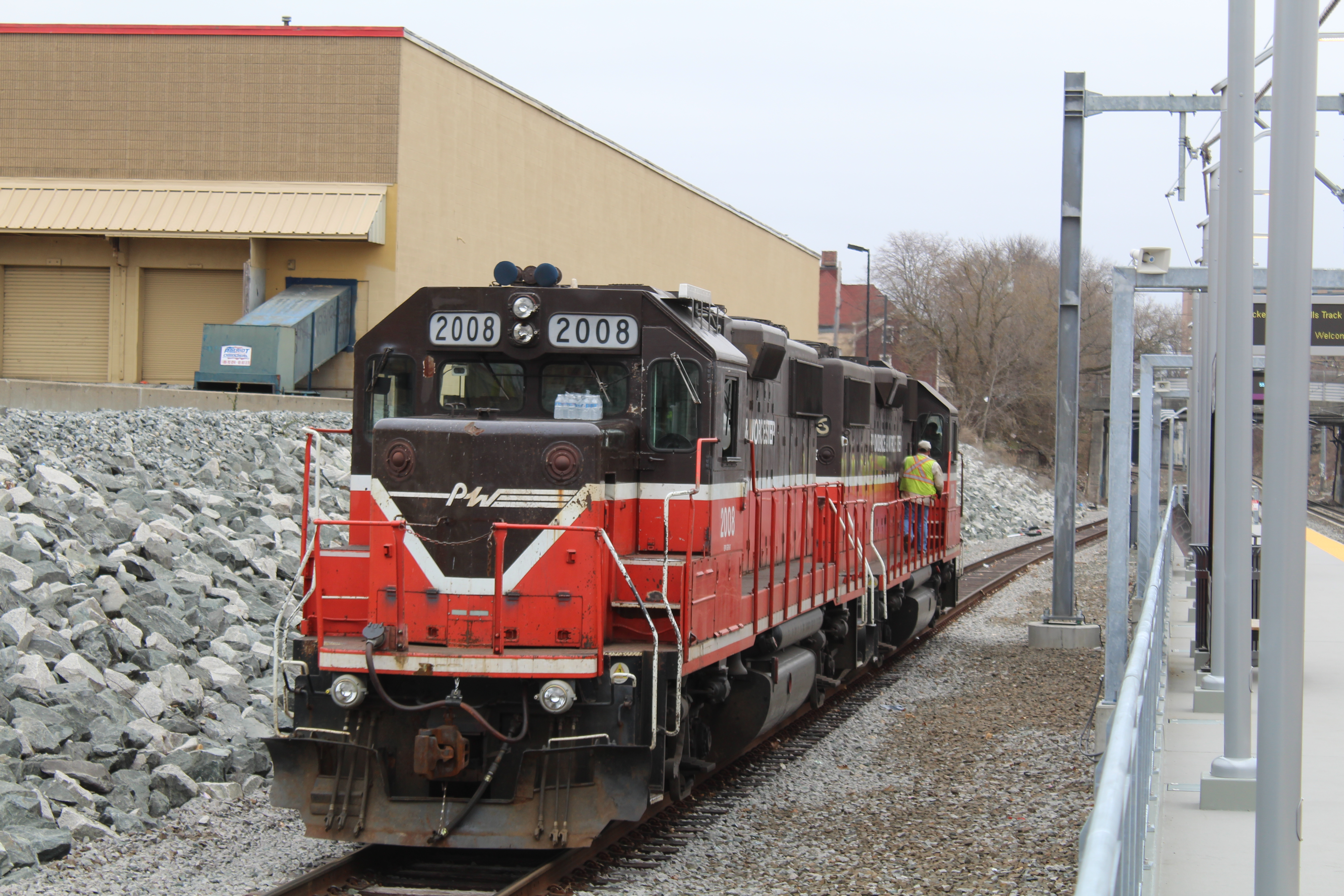
Two Providence and Worcester Railroad GP38-2s at Pawtucket/Central Falls station in 2023

A number of higher horsepower 40 Series locomotives have been rebuilt into the equivalent of a GP38-2, by removal of the turbocharger and the substitution of twin Roots blowers.

CSX and Norfolk Southern have both started replacing cabs on the aging locomotives. NS still calls them GP38-2 while CSX calls them GP38-3.

Union Pacific has rebuilt 167 of their GP38-2's into GP38N's at their Jenk's shop. These units received a microprocessor control system to increase adhesion, control options, and extend the life of the locomotive. Ten other GP38-2 locomotives were rebuilt into Tier 4 switchers, designated as GP22T4.

== Preservation ==
Several GP38-2s operate on tourist railroads and are preserved at railroad museums.

- The Colebrookdale Railroad operates a GP38-2, #5128, on its excursion trains. #5128 was built as Southern Railway #5128. It was repainted into the Colebrookdale Railroad's colors in 2025.
- Great Smoky Mountains Railroad operates a GP38-2, #2335, on their excursion trains. It was built as St. Louis–San Francisco Railway (Frisco) #664.
- NdeM #9271 is preserved at the Museo de Ferrocarril Mexicano de Sur in Oaxaca, Mexico.
- Southern Railway #5000, the first GP38-2 built, operates at the Tennessee Valley Railroad Museum in Chattanooga, Tennessee. It has been restored to its original paint scheme. #5000 was traded from Progress Rail with Norfolk Southern #5033 in 2017.
- Southern Railway #5044 operates as TVRM #5044 at the Tennessee Valley Railroad Museum in Chattanooga, Tennessee. It is painted black and lettered for the museum.
- Southern Railway #5109 operates as TVRM #5109 at the Tennessee Valley Railroad Museum in Chattanooga, Tennessee. It is painted in the museum's black and red scheme with yellow striping.
- Canadian Pacific #7309 (formerly Lehigh Valley Railroad #322, later Delaware & Hudson #7309) was acquired by the Saratoga Corinth & Hudson Railway in Corinth, New York. It is the very first short hood GP38-2 in preservation. It is planned to be repainted back into its Delaware & Hudson appearance.

== See also ==
- List of GM-EMD locomotives
- List of GMD Locomotives
- Peacekeeper Rail Garrison, one ex-CSX GP38-2 was acquired by the United States Air Force and modified for a proposed rail-based ICBM system.
