= Al-Haditha, Saudi Arabia =

Al-Haditha الحديثة
- Location in Al Jawf Province, Saudi Arabia
- Coordinates: 31°27′19″N 37°09′35″E
- Country: Saudi Arabia
- Province: Al Jawf (Al-Jouf)

Al-Haditha (Arabic: الحديثة) is a small town in Saudi Arabia 25 km from Al Qurayyat, near the border with Jordan.

== Transport ==
It is on the route of a proposed railway connection Saudi Arabia with Jordan. This railway if extended would align with Damascus in Syria. See Saudi Railways Organization for more information. There is an airport about 20 km from Haditha, Gurayat Domestic Airport.

== See also ==
- Railway stations in Saudi Arabia

== Namesake ==
There is a village in Jordan with a similar name.
