= EMD GP18 =

American 4-axle diesel locomotive

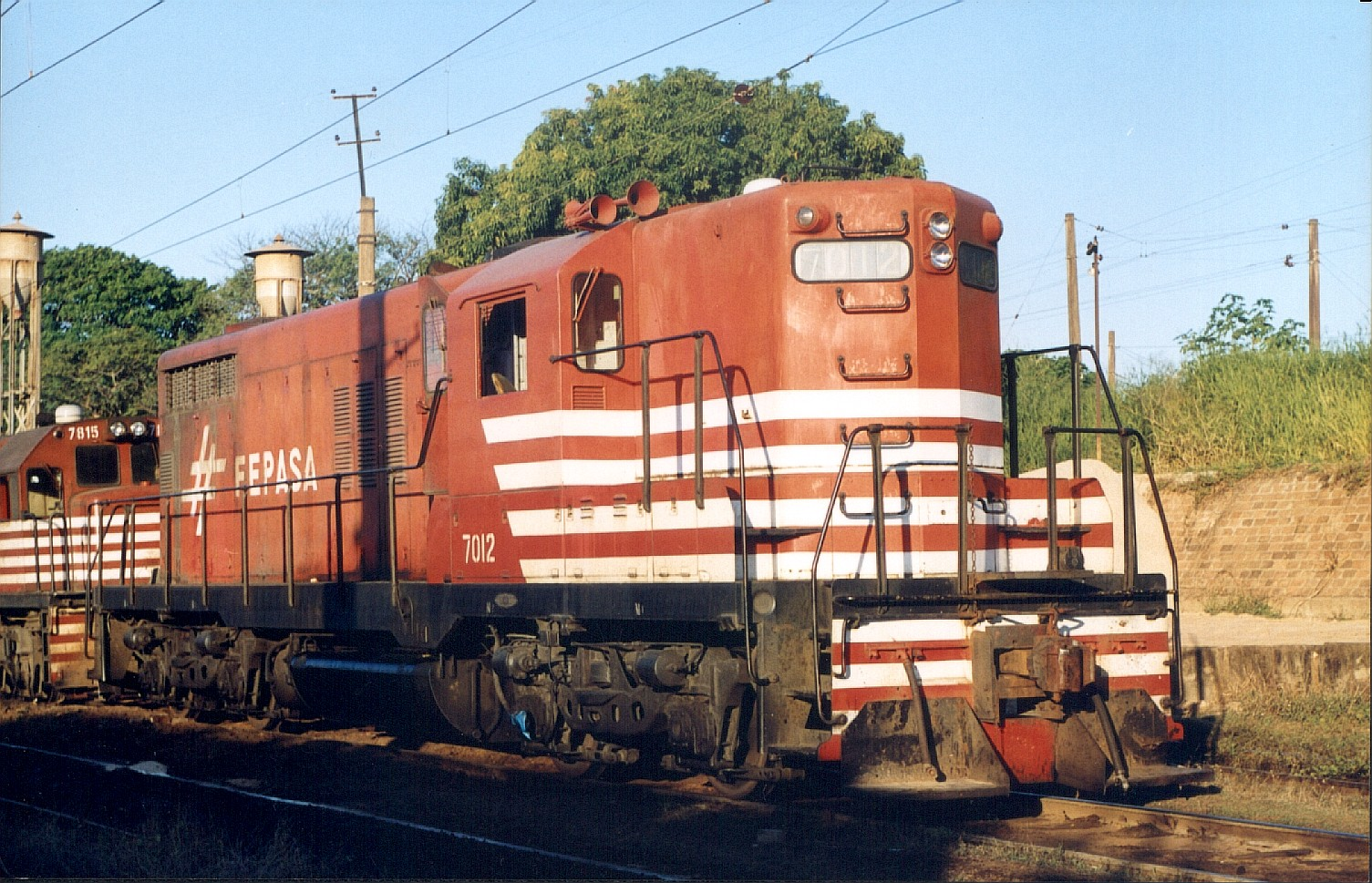
- An EMD GP18 owned and operated by FEPASA (formerly Araraquara Railway).
Type and origin
- Power type: Diesel-electric
- Builder: General Motors, Electro-Motive Division (EMD)
- Model: GP18
- Build date: December 1959 – November 1963
- Total produced: U.S.- 350 units, Mexico- 40 units, export- 15 units. 405 units total.
Specifications
- Configuration
  - AAR: B-B
  - UIC: Bo'Bo'
- Gauge: Most units: 4 ft 8 1/2 in (1,435 mm) standard gauge Brazilian units: 5 ft 3 in (1,600 mm)
- Fuel capacity: 1,700 US gallons (6,400 L; 1,400 imp gal)
- Prime mover: EMD 16-567D1
- Engine type: V16 diesel engine
- Aspiration: Roots blower
- Cylinders: 16
Performance figures
- Power output: 1,800 hp (1.34 MW) (Note: Except for one GP18M rated at 1,750 hp (1.30 MW), and 4 rated at 1,500 hp (1.12 MW). See the Original buyers section for more information.)
Career
- Locale: United States, Mexico, Brazil, Peru and Saudi Arabia

The EMD GP18 is a 4-axle diesel-electric locomotive built by General Motors, Electro-Motive Division between December 1959 and November 1963. Power was provided by a 16-567D1 16-cylinder engine which generated 1,800 horsepower (1.34 MW). The GP18 replaced the GP9 in EMD's catalog. 350 examples of this locomotive model were built for American railroads, 40 units were built for Mexican railroads, 12 were built for export to a Brazilian railroad, 2 were exported to Peru, and 1 was exported to Saudi Arabia.

== Design and Production ==
The GP18 in many ways resembled its predecessors, the GP7 and GP9. It was designed nearly identically to the two previous models, but differed in having a metal grid over its radiator shutters, while the GP7 and GP9 instead incorporated a design described as looking like "chicken wire". Additionally, the GP18 had 50 more horsepower than the GP9, for a total of 1,800 horsepower. The new "18" model number was chosen by EMD to reflect the unit's upgraded horsepower rating.

GP18s could be customized by their buyers: railroads ordered GP18s with either high or low short hoods, with or without dynamic brakes, and in the case of Grand Trunk Western, with the optional addition of steam generators.

== Original buyers ==
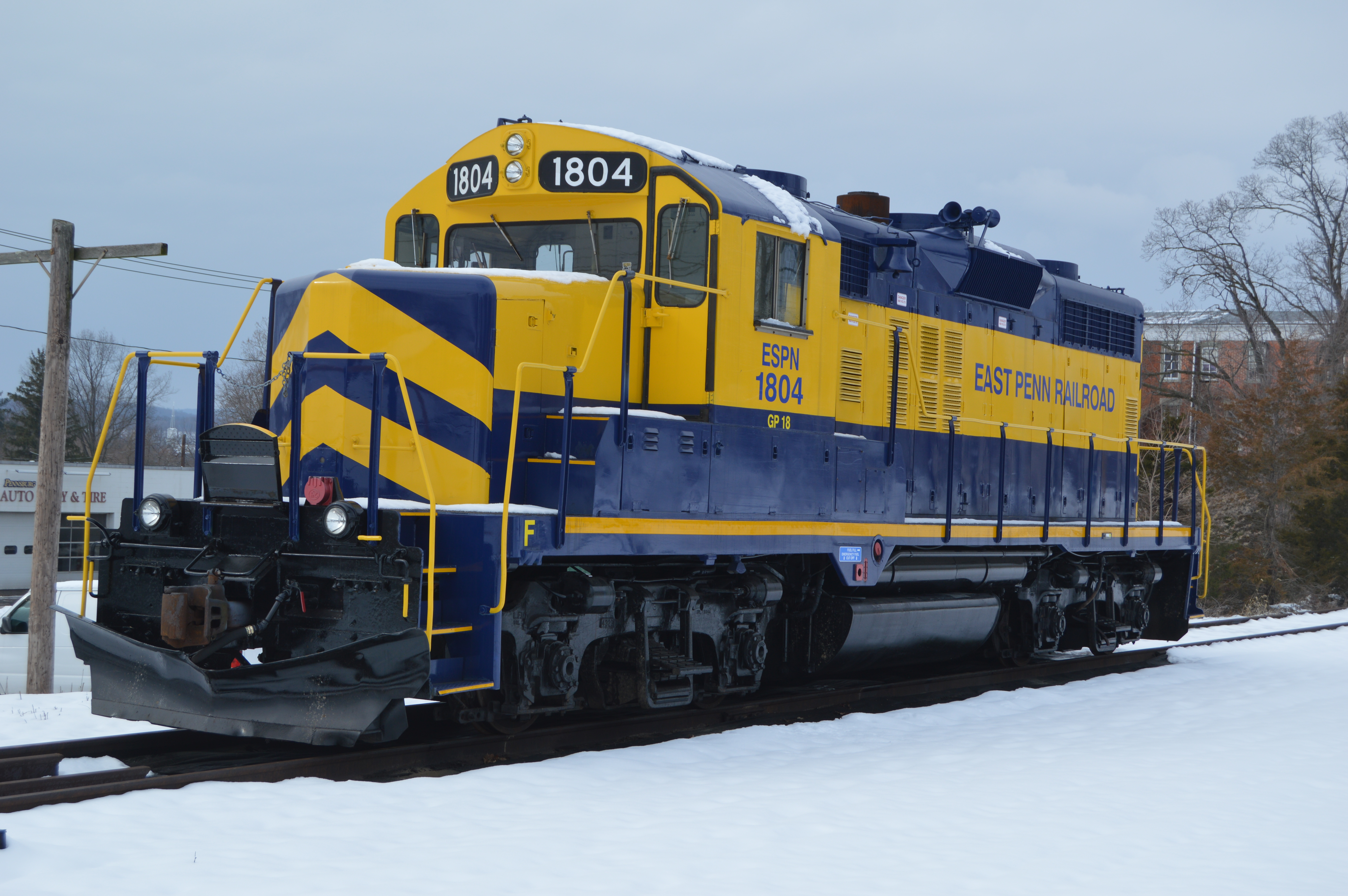
East Penn Railroad EMD GP18 locomotive in Pennsburg, Pennsylvania

Railroad	Quantity	Road numbers	Notes
Aberdeen and Rockfish Railroad	1	300	
Baltimore and Ohio Railroad	1	6599	GP18M 1,750 horsepower (1,300 kW)
Boston and Maine Railroad	6	1750–1755	Mistakenly delivered as 1770–1775, but quickly renumbered to 1750-1755
Central of Georgia Railway	8	171–178	To Southern Railway 171–178
Chicago and North Western Railway	6	1774–1779	
Grand Trunk Western Railroad	11	4700–4707, 4950–4952	4950-4952 equipped with steam generators
Illinois Central Railroad	29	9400–9428	
Lehigh Valley Railroad	4	302–305	To Conrail 7496–7499
Louisville and Nashville Railroad	5	460–464	Renumbered 900–904, Then Seaboard System 1066–1070.
Missouri Pacific Railroad	146	400–499, 534–550, 4801-4829	400–499 built with AAR Type B trucks
New York, Susquehanna and Western Railway	3	1800, 1802, 1804	Sold in 2010 to East Penn Railroad
New York, Chicago and St. Louis Railroad (“Nickel Plate Road”)	10	700–709	To Norfolk and Western Railway 2700–2709
Norfolk and Western Railway	48	915–962	
Norfolk Southern Railway	17	1–17	To Southern Railway 180–196
Northern Pacific Railway	9	376–384	To Burlington Northern Railroad 1990–1998
Phelps Dodge Corporation (New Cornelia Mine)	3	44–46	
Chicago, Rock Island and Pacific Railroad	24	1238–1239, 1256, 1333–1353	1238–1239, 1256 are 1,500 horsepower (1,100 kW) GP18M.
Seaboard Air Line Railroad	10	400–409	To Seaboard Coast Line Railroad 1056–1065
Tennessee, Alabama and Georgia Railway	1	801	Renumbered 50 soon after delivery; to Southern Railway 179
Texas and Pacific Railway	5	1145–1149	To Missouri Pacific Railroad 500–504
Texas Mexican Railway	2	854–855	
Toledo, Peoria and Western Railway	1	600	To Vermont Railway 801
National Railways of Mexico	37	7500–7536	7520-7529 equipped with steam generators
Ministry of Communication and Transportation (Mexico)	3	7123 - 5 to 7	To Sonora-Baja California 2304–2306
Araraquara Railway (Brazil)	12	1006–1017	1,600 mm (5 ft 3 in) gauge
Saudi Government Railways	1	1200	GP18M 1,500 horsepower (1,100 kW)
Southern Peru Copper Corp.	2	24-25	
Total	405		
