= Jalamid =

Town and crossroads in Saudi Arabia

Coordinates: 31°16′49″N 40°06′15″E

Jalamid (Arabic: حزم الجلاميد) is a town and crossroads in Saudi Arabia near the Iraqi border.

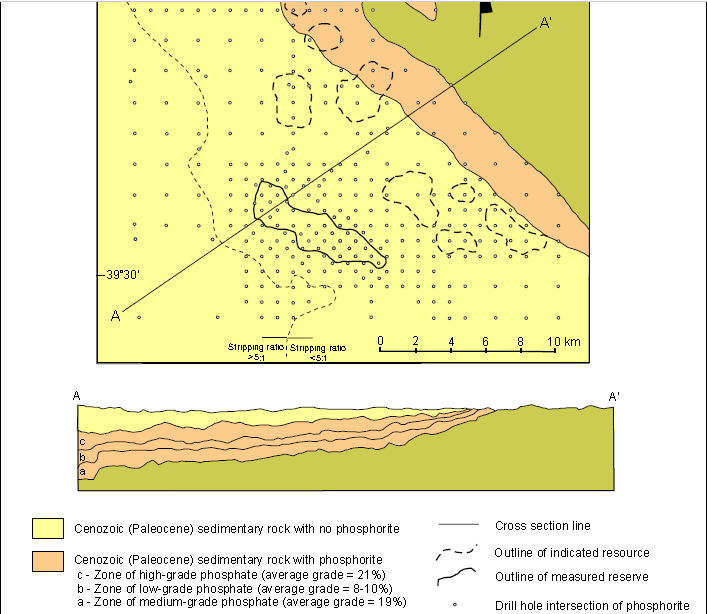
Al Jalamid Phosphate geological map and cross section

== Jalamid Phosphate Mine ==
The Al Jalamid site comprises the phosphate mine, beneficiation plant and supporting infrastructure and encompasses an area of approx. 50 km^{2}. Mine production is around 11.6 Mtpy of ore and the beneficiation facilities can produce an estimated 5 Mtpy of flotation concentrate on a dry basis. Ma'aden's measured phosphate resources at Al Jalamid stand at 534 Mt. Substantial investment has also been made in industrial infrastructure at Al Jalamid including a power plant, potable water production, treatment and distribution facilities, roads and telecommunications supports the mining and beneficiation operations. The phosphate concentrate is transported by rail from Al Jalamid to Ras Al Khair for processing.

== Transport ==
In mid-2011, Saudi Railways Company launched 1,392 km long railway project to link phosphate-producing areas including Jalamid with ports.

== See also ==
- Railway stations in Saudi Arabia
- Transport in Saudi Arabia
