= Fluid Equipment Development Company =

Manufacturer

Fluid Equipment Development Company, LLC
- Company type: Private
- Headquarters: Monroe, Michigan USA
- Number of locations: Dubai, UAE - Singapore
- Area served: Worldwide
- Products: High Pressure Feed Pumps, Energy Recovery Turbo-Boosters and custom combinations
- Divisions: Global Representative Network
- Website: http://www.fedco-usa.com/

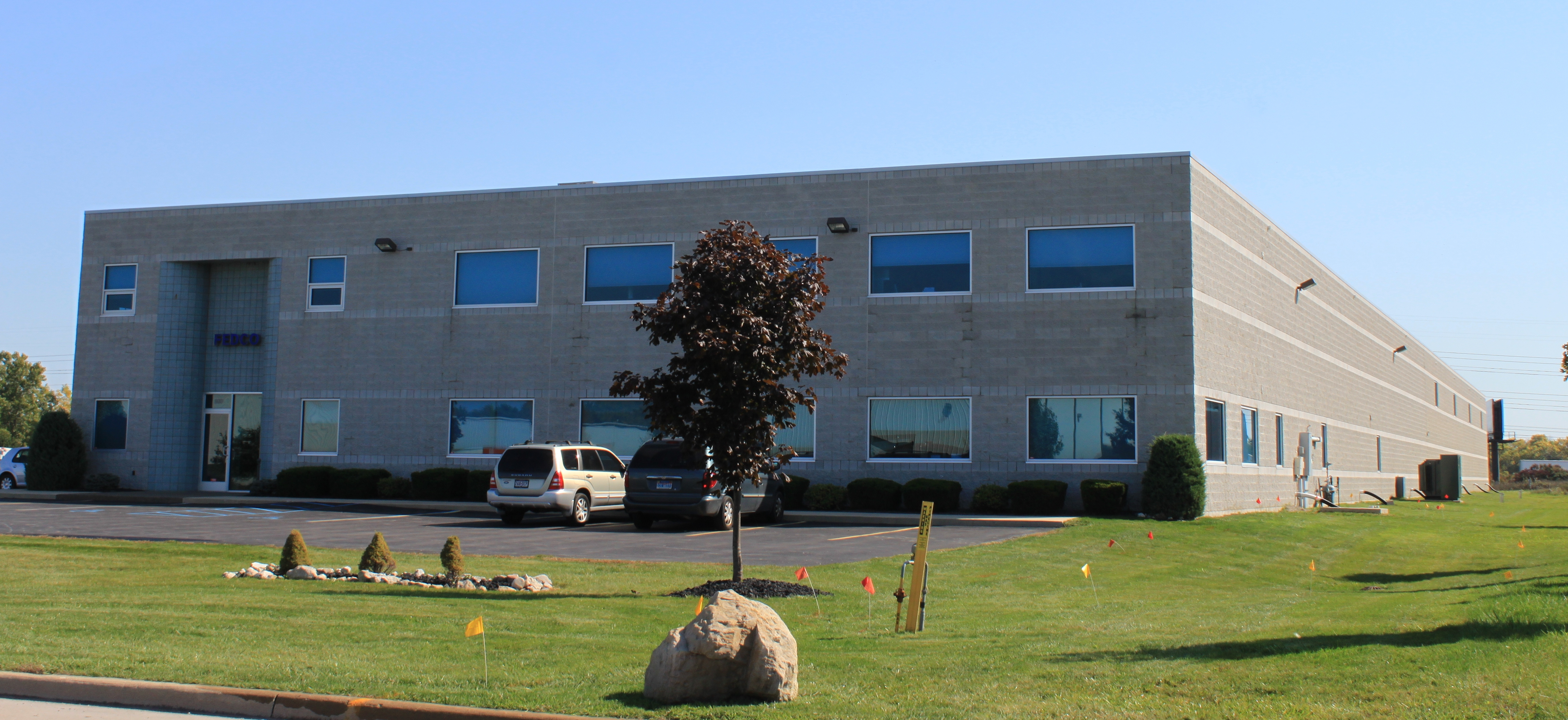
FEDCO headquarters, Monroe, MI

Fluid Equipment Development Company (FEDCO) is a Michigan-based designer and manufacturer of high-pressure feed pumps and brine energy recovery devices (ERDs) for brackish water reverse osmosis (BWRO) and seawater reverse osmosis (SWRO) systems. With over 3,500 units in service, FEDCO pumps and ERDs can be found on 6 continents, specifically in areas with little freshwater and rainfall or dense populations. Reverse osmosis (RO) applications including SWRO plants, boiler feedwater, oil platforms, ocean liners, military systems, hotels and resorts.

RO is most commonly used to make potable water from sea-water by removing salt and other impurities. In other cases it is used to purify water for cleaning of sensitive materials/parts and electrical power generation.

The RO process requires one or several high-pressure pumps and an energy and dollar saving ERD. The FEDCO patented MSS and HPB (ERD) has propelled the company's remarkable growth.

== History ==
In the early 1980s, Eli Oklejas was chief R&D hydraulic designer and head of the R&D lab at a major pump company. He was assigned the task of testing a piston-type RO energy recovery device. After dealing with several failures and being frustrated by the overall system complexity, he proposed development of a turbocharger device to boost the feed pressure using brine hydraulic energy, however, the idea was not pursued.

Mr. Oklejas left to co-found Pump Engineering, Inc. where he served as president and he led the effort to develop turbochargers for RO applications until his departure in 1996. FEDCO was founded in 1997 as a partnership between Osmonics, Inc. and Eli Oklejas. FEDCO's goal was to develop innovative high-pressure pumps and energy recovery devices.

General Electric became FEDCO's partner from 2003 through 2006.

Currently, FEDCO is 100% privately owned and has continued its focus on its growth in Michigan, innovation, quality and cost-effective solutions for pumping and energy recovery. This effort culminated with the introduction of the Hydraulic Pressure Booster (HPB) and the MSS series of high pressure feed pumps. Mr. Oklejas continues to serve as president of FEDCO as well as leading the development of several new pump and energy recovery product lines reaching new industry benchmarks.

In June 2012, FEDCO and Torishima Pump Manufacturing of Osaka, Japan announced the formation of Advanced Pumps International, a 50/50 joint venture company that will focus on developing and manufacturing pumping equipment for the oil and gas industries. The joint venture will be based in Monroe, Michigan, and plans to begin operations in the fall of 2012. Its products will be manufactured in accordance with API standards for a wide range of oil industry applications.

The success of FEDCO continues and its developments have been highlighted on the CBS' Eye on America. The segment, on business and technology, focuses on the increasing need for potable water and describes how energy recovery is playing a significant role in the selection of process equipment.

== Gallery ==
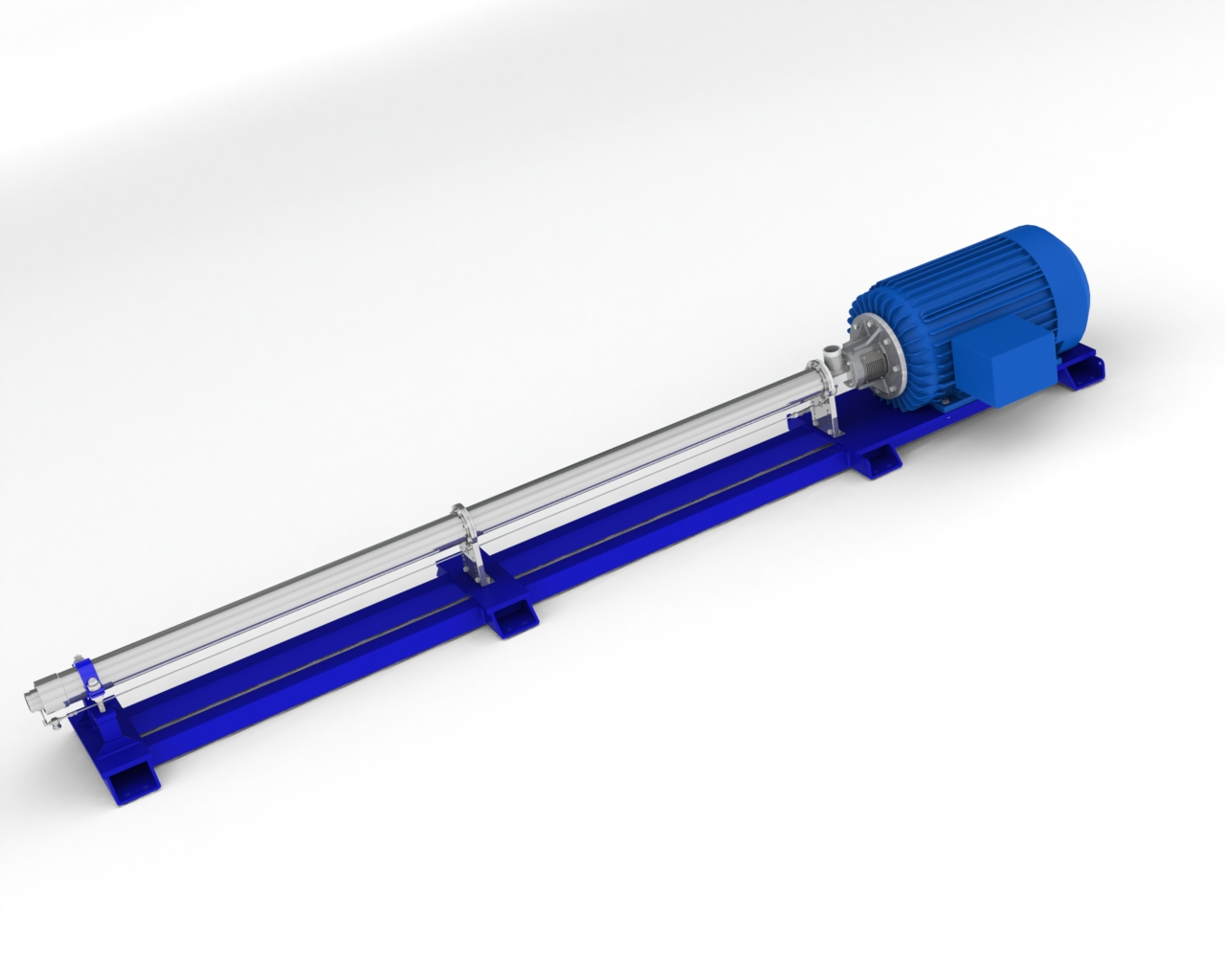
MSS Series High Pressure Multi Stage Seawater Pump (MSS)

Single Stage High Pressure Feed Pump (SSD)

High Pressure-Hydraulic Energy Management Integration (HP-HEMI)

Low Pressure Drive generates electricity from a brine stream.(LPD)

Hydraulic Pressure Booster (HPB)

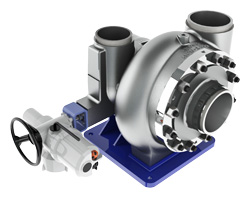
Hydraulic Pressure Booster (HPB)

MSD Series High Pressure Multi Stage Duplex Feed Pump (MSD)
