= Saudi Railways Organization =

Defunct state-owned railway company of Saudi Arabia

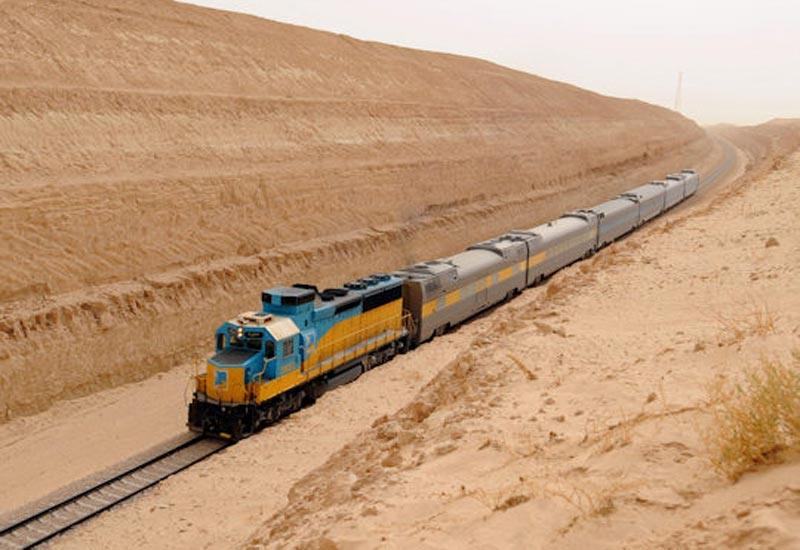
- Passenger train on the Dammam–Riyadh line.
- Native name: المؤسسة العامة للخطوط الحديدية
- Founded: 13 May 1966; 60 years ago
- Defunct: 1 April 2021
- Fate: Merged into the Saudi Railway Company (now Saudi Arabia Railways)
- Headquarters: Dammam railway station, Dammam, Saudi Arabia
- Area served: Saudi Arabia
- Key people: Abdullah Bin Abdulrahman Al-Muqbil (Chairman); Rumaih Mohamed Alrumaih (President)
- Revenue: SAR 535 million (2014)
- Website: saudirailways.org

The Saudi Railways Organization (SRO) (Arabic: المؤسسة العامة للخطوط الحديدية) was a state-owned railway company that operated part of Saudi Arabia's rail network, along with the Saudi Railway Company (now Saudi Arabia Railways). The SRO operated a network of railways with a total length of approximately 1,380 kilometers (860 mi). The network consisted of two main lines. A 449 km (279 mi) passenger line that links Dammam with Riyadh, and a 556 km (345 mi) freight line that connects the King Abdul Aziz Port in Dammam with Riyadh.

There are plans to extend the network to the Red Sea port of Jeddah and, eventually, to the borders of Jordan, Yemen, and perhaps all the way to Egypt.

Approval to merge the Saudi Railways Organization and the Saudi Railway Company was announced in February 2021. The merger took place on 1 April 2021, and the merged entity is now known as Saudi Arabia Railways.

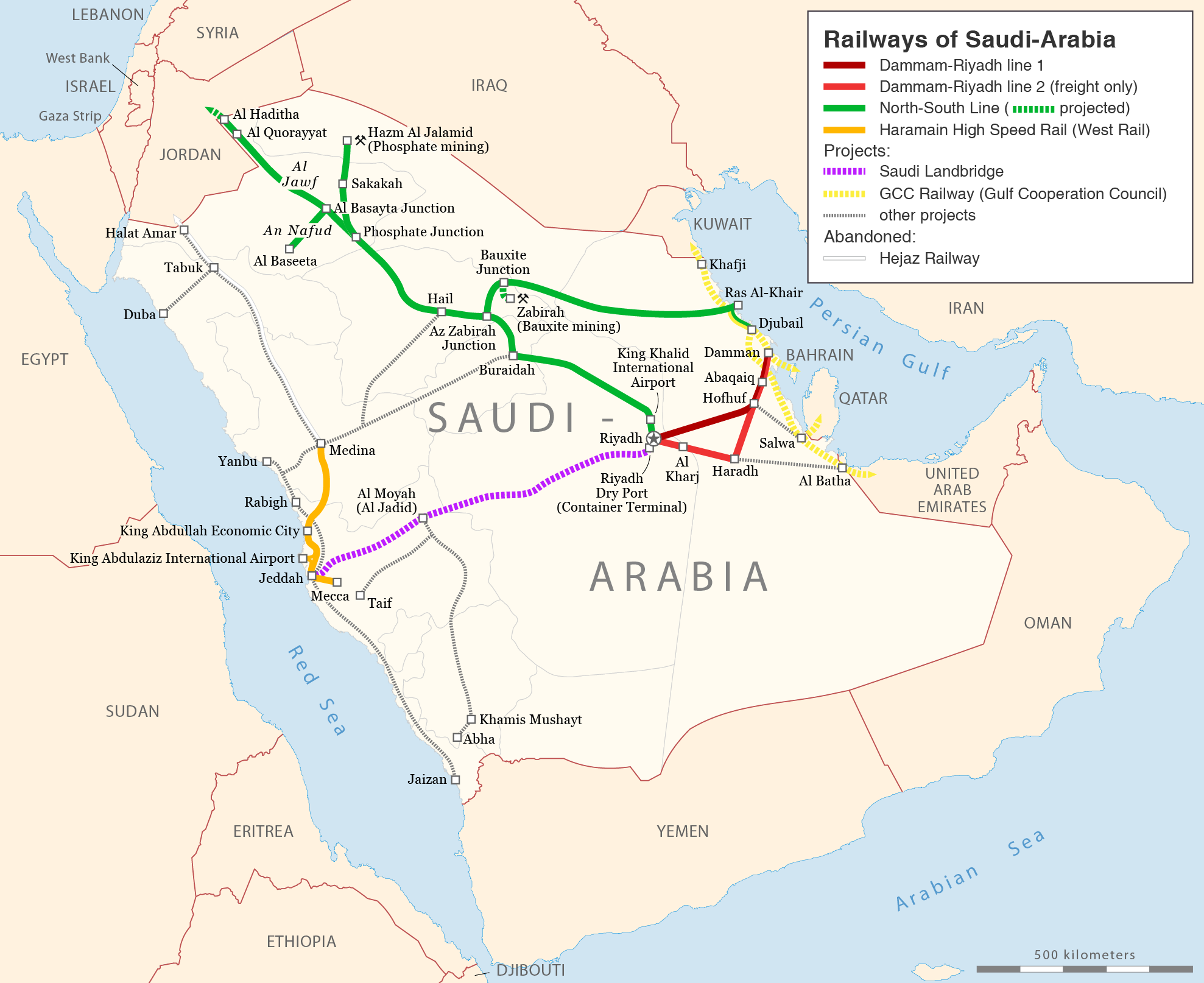
Rail transport map of Saudi Arabia. SRO operated on both red lines.

== Rolling stock ==
Spanish manufacturer CAF delivered eight fast diesel locomotives in 2012, with one driving van trailer passenger car and four other passenger cars, with a leading power car unit, plus two spare power cars. They are used on the Dammam–Riyadh Line. In 2013, the travel time was 4:15, but the target is 3:00 for the future.

=== Trainsets ===
Class	Image	Top speed		Number	Remarks	Built
Class	Image	mph	km/h	Number	Remarks	Built
CAF		112	180	8 passenger units, 10 power cars (5001-5010)	Passenger trainsets with dedicated power cars.	2011

=== Diesel Locomotives ===
Class	Image	Top speed		Number	Remarks	Built
Class	Image	mph	km/h	Number	Remarks	Built
ALCO RS-1		65	105	6	Series 1000-1005 Diesel-electric locomotives. Originally Arabian American Oil Company A11x50-A11x51, 1002-1005	1947–1951
EMD SW1001				5	Series 1022-1026 Order 818000 1/5 Diesel-electric locomotives.	1981
Class 2400		50	80	7	Secondhand Diesel-electric locomotives taken over from NS by Volker Stevin in 1976 for construction works for a seaport in Jubail. Former 2427, 2445, 2485, 2497, 2499, 2519, 2523. Renumbered into 101-107. Sold to Archirodon for rail reconstruction between Damman and Riyadh and renumbered to 276-04 - 276-09. Some scrapped in 1983. Others active until 1994 and stored in Hofuf afterwards.	1954–56
EMD G18				16	Series 1006-1021 Orders 710971-710975, 713081-713082, 713233-713235, and 748005 1/6 Diesel-electric locomotives.	1968–1976
EMD GP18M				1	Series 1200 Order 700178 Diesel-electric locomotives. rated at 1500 horsepower	1961
EMD FP7A				2	Series 1500-1501 Order 7019 Diesel-electric locomotives taken over from Arabian American Oil Company (their 1006-1007).	1953
EMD FP9A				7	Series 1502-1508 Orders 701553, 701493-701494, 702272-702275 Diesel-electric locomotives	1956–1959
GP38-2				1	Series 2000. Order 712783. Diesel-electric locomotives	1973
GPL38S				7	Series 2001-2007. Order 201288865. Diesel-electric locomotives	2015
GT22CW				3	Series 2001-2003. Order 748004. Diesel-electric locomotives	1976
SDL38-2				6	Series 2004-2009. Order 778050. Diesel-electric locomotives	1978
SDL38				6	Series 2030-2035. Order 20148061 Diesel-electric locomotives	2016
EMD SDL50				31	Series 3500-3530 Diesel-electric locomotives	1981–2005
EMD SD70ACS				61	Series 4000-4060 Diesel-electric locomotives for a mineral railway	2010–2016
GT46ACS				17	Series 4300-4316. Orders 20118517 and 20148134. Diesel-electric locomotives	2013–2015
Class 319.2		75	120	>4	Diesel-electric locomotives bought second hand.	

== Expansion ==
The SRO has several plans to expand the network as part of the Saudi Railway Master Plan 2010-2040 (SRMP). Some of the projects under the plan are:

- Saudi Landbridge: The Landbridge project aims to connect the Red Sea with the Persian Gulf. It will involve the construction of a 950 km (590 mi) line from Jeddah Islamic Port to Riyadh, and a 115 km (71 mi) line from Dammam to Jubail.
- North-South line
- The Gulf Railway project is a proposed railway network of 2,116 km (1,315 mi) linking all GCC countries. The length of the track inside Saudi Arabia would be 663 km (412 mi).
- The SRO also has plans to construct three lines in southern Saudi Arabia to improve the region's connectivity with the rest of the country. The lines are the Taif-Khamis Mushayt–Abha line (706 km (439 mi)), the Jeddah-Jizan line (660 km (410 mi)), and the Yanbu–Jeddah line (350 km (220 mi)).

== See also ==
- Saudi Arabia Railways
- Rail transport in Saudi Arabia
- Transport in Saudi Arabia
- Haramain High Speed Railway
