= Qurayyat, Saudi Arabia =

Governorate in Al-Jouf Province, Saudi Arabia

Qurayyat القريات
- Governorate
- Location of Qurayyat Governorate within the Al-Jouf Province

- Location within Saudi Arabia
- Coordinates (Qurayyat): 31°19′N 37°22′E
- Country: Saudi Arabia
- Province: Al-Jouf Province
- Region: Badiyat al-Sham
- Seat: Qurayyat

Government
  - Type: Municipality
  - Body: Qurayyat Municipality

Area
  - Total: 9,495 km^{2} (3,666 sq mi)

Population (2022)
  - Total: 195,016
  - Density: 20.54/km^{2} (53.20/sq mi)
- Time zone: UTC+03:00 (SAST)
- ISO 3166-2: SA-12
- Area code: 014

Qurayyat (Arabic: القريات) is a governorate in Al-Jouf Province, northern Saudi Arabia. Its administrative centre is the city of Qurayyat. The governorate is located near the Jordan–Saudi Arabia border and had a population of 195,016 according to the 2022 census.

== Transportation ==
=== Rail ===
Qurayyat railway station is the northern terminus of the Riyadh–Qurayyat railway, operated by Saudi Arabia Railways (SAR). The railway connects Qurayyat with Riyadh and other cities along the route.

=== Air ===
The governorate is served by Gurayat Domestic Airport (IATA: URY, ICAO: OEGT), located approximately 10 kilometres (6.2 mi) from the city of Qurayyat. The airport provides domestic flights operated by Saudia to destinations including Riyadh and Jeddah.

=== Road ===
Qurayyat is connected by road networks to other parts of northern Saudi Arabia and to Jordan through the Al-Hadithah border crossing, located approximately 30 kilometres (19 mi) west of Qurayyat. The crossing is one of the Kingdom's major land border points, serving passenger and freight traffic between Saudi Arabia and Jordan.

== See also ==
- Provinces of Saudi Arabia
- List of governorates of Saudi Arabia
- List of cities and towns in Saudi Arabia
