= Transport in Saudi Arabia =

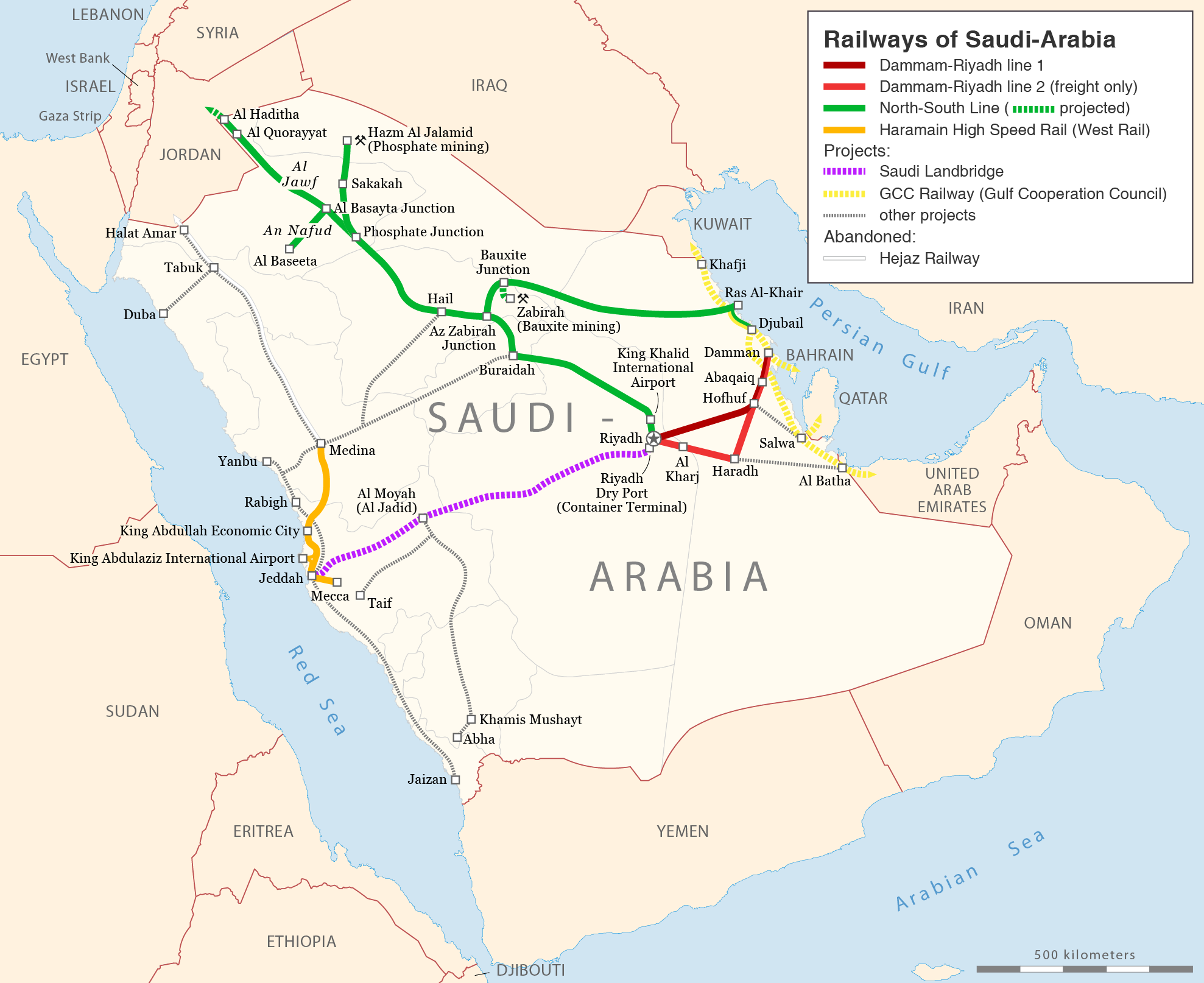

Overview
- Native name: نظام النقل بالمملكة العربية السعودية
- Owner: Ministry of Transport and Logistic Services
- Area served: Saudi Arabia
- Chief executive: Saleh bin Nasser Al-Jasser (as minister)
- Headquarters: Riyadh
- Website: Official website

Operation
- Operator: Ministry of Transport and Logistic Services

Transport in Saudi Arabia is facilitated through a relatively new system of roads, railways and seaways. Most of the network started construction after the discovery of oil in the Eastern Province in 1952, with the notable exception of Highway 40, which was built to connect the capital Riyadh to the economically productive Eastern Province, and later to the Islamic holy city of Mecca and the port city of Jeddah. With the economic growth of the 1970s, of Saudi Arabia has initiated many infrastructure development projects across the country, and the extensive development of the transportation network has followed suit in support of various economic developments.

== Roads ==
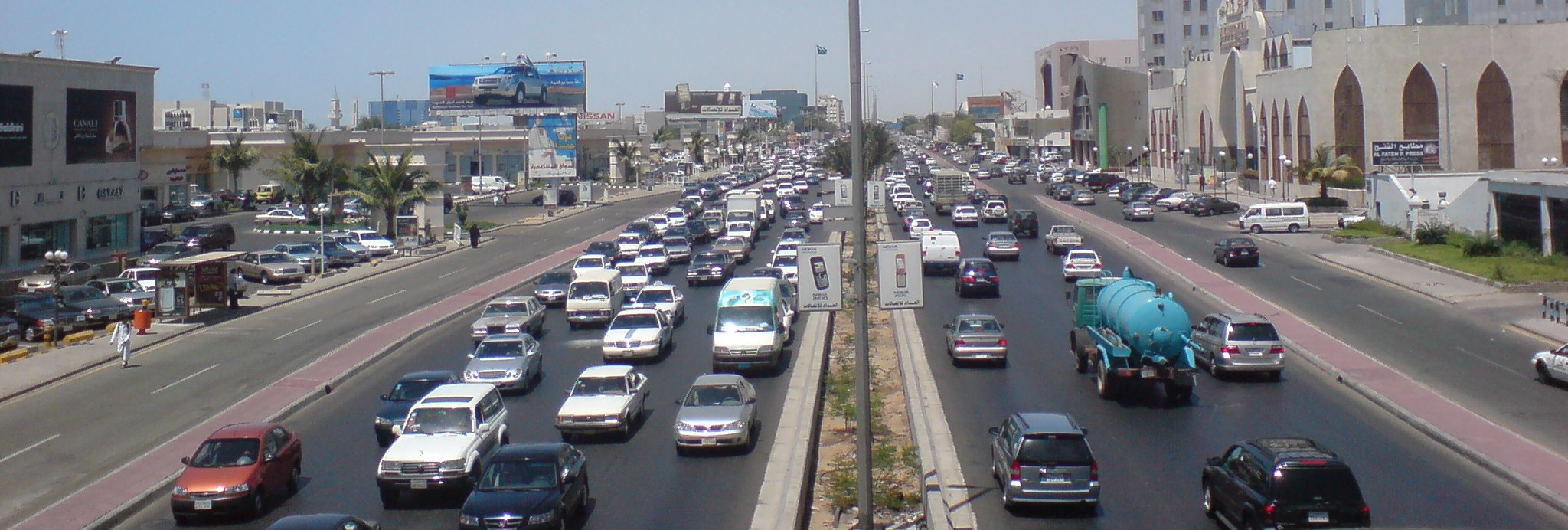
Traffic on Medina Road in Jeddah

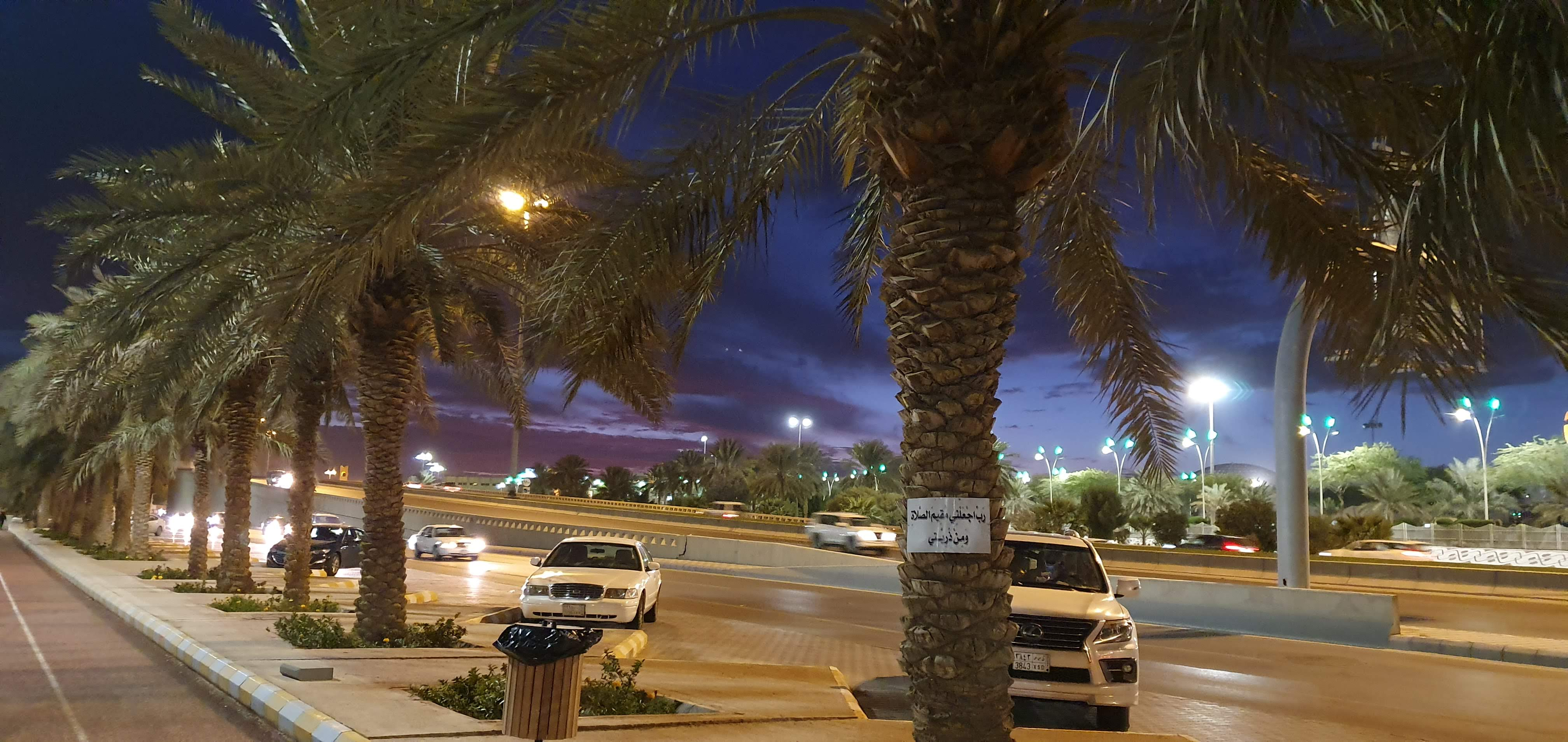
King Fahad Road in Buraydah

=== History and overview ===
In 1921, King Abdulaziz introduced the first car in Saudi Arabia. However, by the time the Kingdom was established in 1932, there were still less than 30 miles (48 km) of paved roadways in the country. Cars eventually supplanted camels as the main mode of transport in the Kingdom in the 1950s, with a major uptick in car ownership occurring in the 1970s. The roads of Saudi Arabia gradually became the defining feature of the kingdom's transport system as the main population centres are not only scattered all over the country but also because they faced a major challenge from the geography of the country itself; separated by deserts, valleys and mountains, among other landforms. Due to this, a reliable road network became more important and essential than other modes of transport in the kingdom.

Saudi Arabia had encouraged road transport in the past by maintaining one of the lowest petrol prices in the world. Despite raising prices in 2018, it is worth noting that due to limited alternative passenger transport options in the country, the gasoline fuel demand is relatively inelastic to its prices; light-duty vehicles dominate the passenger transport landscape. Buses and other public transport options are limited, and walking or bicycles are hindered by the urban landscapes and harsh weather in most regions of the country.

The development of the Saudi road network can be divided into two major phases; i.e. the expansion of the modern road network from 1938 to 1970, preceding the initial development plans conceived by the Ministry of Transport and Logistic Services, and the development and expansion after the introduction of the plans (after 1970). The two stages, pre-national planning and postnational planning, relate to the historical circumstances of the economic, political and social demands of the kingdom. The activity during the second stage greatly exceeds that during the first owing to the existence of coordinated plans, high investment and concentration of effort.

=== Highway network ===
The Ministry of Transport and Logistic Services in 2014 maintained a total estimated road length of 627,000 km, of which 151,000 km were highways linking major regions of Saudi Arabia with international borders and serving as interconnecting roads between the major Saudi Arabian cities; 102,000 km were secondary roads linking major cities with other smaller cities in their respective provinces; 374,000 km were feeder roads branching out of secondary roads and serving towns, villages & agricultural areas. Another 204,000 km of roads was under construction by the end of fiscal year 2014. The Ministry of Transport and Logistic Services maintains 151,000 km of major roads linking the major Saudi Arabian cities and the kingdom to its neighbors.

Major highways of Saudi Arabia
Saudi highway network	Mashreq network	Southern or western terminus	Northern or eastern terminus	Map
Highway 5	M55	**Road 45** at Yemeni border in Tuwal	**Highway 15**/**Highway 65** at Jordanian border in Durra	Map of Highway 5
Highway 10	M90	Highway 5 in Al Darb	**E11** at Emirati border in Batha'	Map of Highway 10
Highway 15	M45	**S150** at Yemeni border in Al Wadi'ah	**Highway 5** at Jordanian border in Halat 'Ammar	Map of Highway 15
Highway 40	M80	Highway 5 in Jeddah	Route 613 in Dammam	Map of Highway 40
Highway 50	M70 from Artawiyah	Highway 40 in Dhalm	**M70** at Kuwaiti border in Ruqa'i	Map of Highway 50
Highway 60	M70	Highway 5 near Yanbu	Highway 50 in Artawiyah	Map of Highway 60
Highway 65	M35	Highway 10 in Hotat Bani Tamim	**Highway 30** at Jordanian border in Qurayyat	Map of Highway 65
Highway 70		Route 375 in AlUla	Highway 6262 in Linah	Map of Highway 70
Highway 75		Route 180 in Al Kharkhir	Highway 95 near Tanajib	Map of Highway 75
Highway 80	M50	Highway 5 in Duba	**Road 22** at Iraqi border in 'Arar	Map of Highway 80
Highway 85	M25	Highway 65 in Qurayyat	Highway 95 near Jubail	Map of Highway 85
Highway 95	M5	**E11** at Emirati border in Batha'	**Road 40** at Kuwaiti border in Khafji	Map of Highway 95
Note(s): Highway number(s) in bold indicate that the route is not part of the Saudi highway network.

Most of these highways are two-lane highways, and some of them are not separated by median strips. The Ministry of Transport has been working on a project to gradually modernize these roads. Highway 10 currently holds the record for world's longest straight road, with the 256 km (159 mi) section from Haradh to the Batha' border with UAE cutting through the Rub' al-Khali desert, beating the previous record holder, Australia's Eyre Highway, by 110 km (68 mi). On 19 February 2018, the speed limit on sections of Highway 5, Highway 15, Highway 40 and Highway 65 was increased from 120 km/h (75 mph) to 140 km/h (87 mph).

== Rail ==
=== History and overview ===
Map of the historic Hejaz railway

The first railway line in the kingdom predates the unification of Saudi Arabia. The 1,050 mm (3 ft 5^{11}/_{32} in) narrow-gauge Hejaz railway, that ran from Damascus to Medina, began construction in 1900 under the Ottoman Empire Hejaz Vilayet, and was completed in 1908. A proposal to further extend the line to Mecca was made, but was never materialized. The southern portion of the line was mostly destroyed during the World War I. A few sections of the track remain, with some sections in Jordan being used up to today. The stations in Mada'in Salih and Medina have been converted into museums (Hejaz Railway Museum and Mada'in Salih Railway Station), each having some locomotives and rolling stock from the original railway.

The first railway line built and completed under Saudi rule was the 569 km (354 mi) Dammam-Riyadh line, which began construction in 1947. It was inaugurated on October 20, 1951, by King Abdulaziz. This was before the formation of the Saudi Railways Organization (SRO), and the railway line was run and maintained by Saudi Aramco, before being entrusted to the Ministry of Finance. On May 13, 1966, a royal decree established the SRO, a public corporation that now runs the line. The main railway stations for passengers opened in Riyadh, Dammam, and Hofuf in 1981. The modern passenger line between Riyadh and Dammam measuring 449 km (279 mi) was completed in 1985.

The other conventional railway line in the kingdom is the North–South line, also known as the Riyadh–Qurayyat line, which runs from the capital Riyadh to border with Jordan at Hadithah via Buraidah, Ḥaʼil and Qurayyat, with feeder lines to multiple phosphate mining and bauxite mining locations in the northern parts of the kingdom. The largest feeder line connects the main line to the port city of Ra's Al-Khair, near Jubail, giving the line a total length of more than 2,750 km (1,710 mi). The only high-speed railway line in the kingdom, the Haramain High Speed Railway, was completed in 2017, and connects the two Islamic holy cities of Mecca and Medina via the King Abdulaziz International Airport in Jeddah and the King Abdullah Economic City near Rabigh.

=== Detail ===
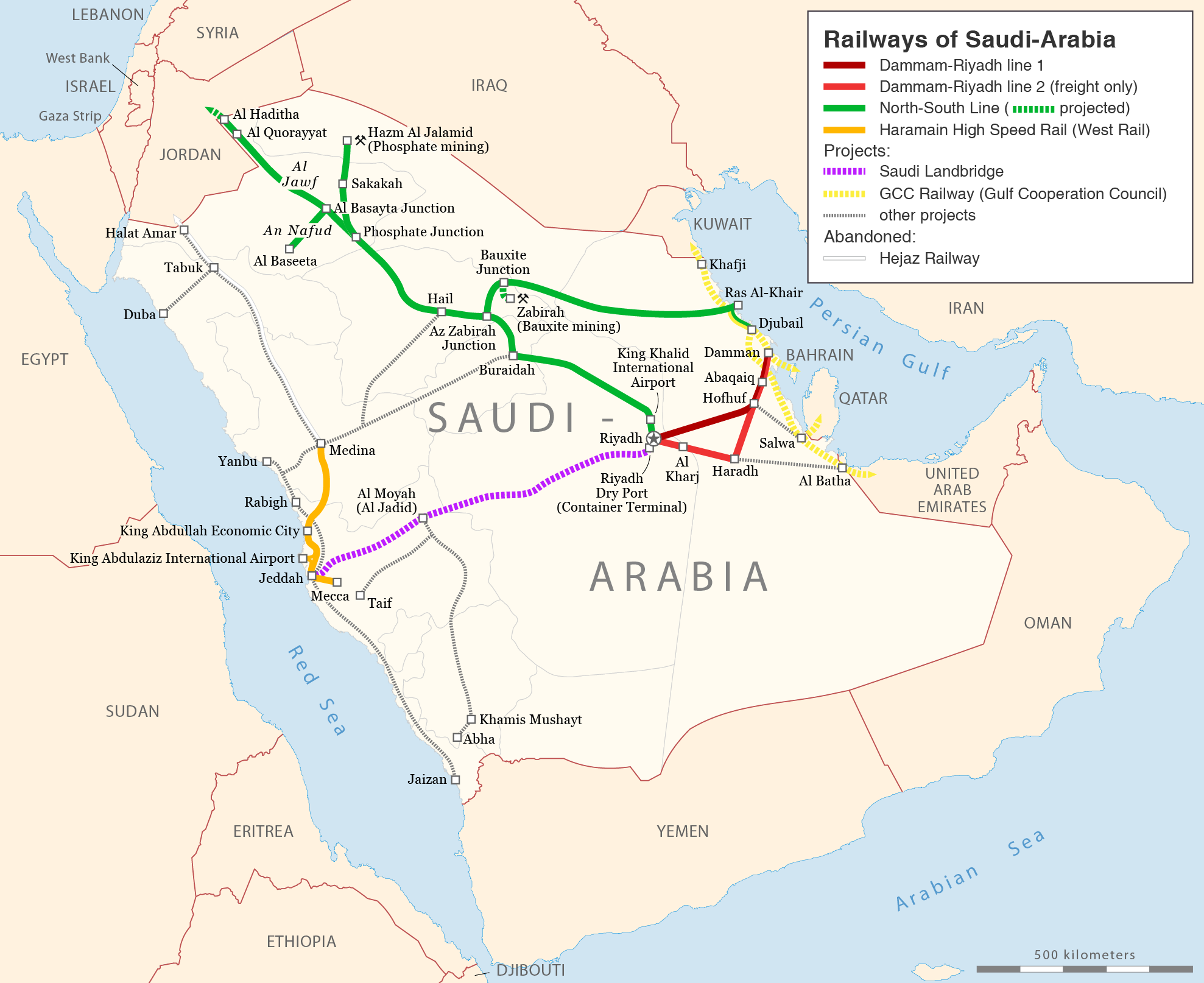
Map of present-day Saudi Arabian railway network with future projects

The historic 1,300 km (810 mi) 1,035 mm (3 ft 5^{11}/_{32} in) narrow-gauge Ottoman Hejaz railway was mostly destroyed during World War I and its stations in Mada'in Salih and Medina have been converted to museums. Within two decades of the unification of Saudi Arabia, the first Dammam–Riyadh line was completed in 1951, and was 569 km (354 mi) long. This line was later converted to only be used for freight transport, with a new, shorter, 449 km (279 mi) line being completed in 1985, exclusively for the transport of passengers. The other passenger line in the kingdom is the Riyadh–Qurayyat line, which runs through the middle of the country connecting the capital Riyadh to Ha'il, Al-Majma'ah, the Al-Jawf Province and Jordan via Qurayyat. It is the longest line in the Saudi rail network, and with a feeder line connecting it to the port of Ra's al-Khair, its total length comes up to around 2,750 km (1,710 mi). The North–South line uses portions of the Riyadh–Qurayyat line and connects the main line to phosphate and bauxite mining locations in the northern reaches of the kingdom.

Apart from mass transit systems such as metros, the only high-speed railway line in the kingdom is the Haramain High Speed Railway, construction of which was completed in 2017. The line is 453 km (281 mi) long and connects the two Islamic holy cities of Mecca and Medina via the King Abdulaziz International Airport in Jeddah and the King Abdullah Economic City.

== Air ==
King Fahd International Airport, the largest airport in the world by area

Saudi Arabia is served by three major international airports: the King Khalid International Airport in Riyadh, the King Abdulaziz International Airport in Jeddah, and the King Fahd International Airport in Dammam, which is also the largest airport in the world by area. In addition to these three major airports, several smaller airports, providing both domestic and international connections, are present throughout the kingdom, such as the Prince Mohammad bin Abdulaziz International Airport in Medina and the Taif International Airport in Taif among others.

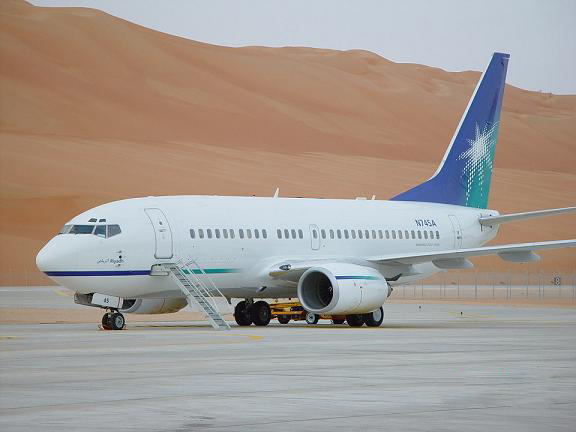
A Saudi Aramco Aviation Boeing 737 aircraft at Shaybah

The Saudi Arabian flag carrier, Saudia, began operations in 1945 with a single twin-engine Douglas DC-3 Dakota gifted by President of the United States Franklin D. Roosevelt. Today, the airline operates a fleet of over 140 aircraft, transporting more than 34 million passengers annually to 95 destinations worldwide. In 2023, Riyadh Air was established as the country's second flag carrier.

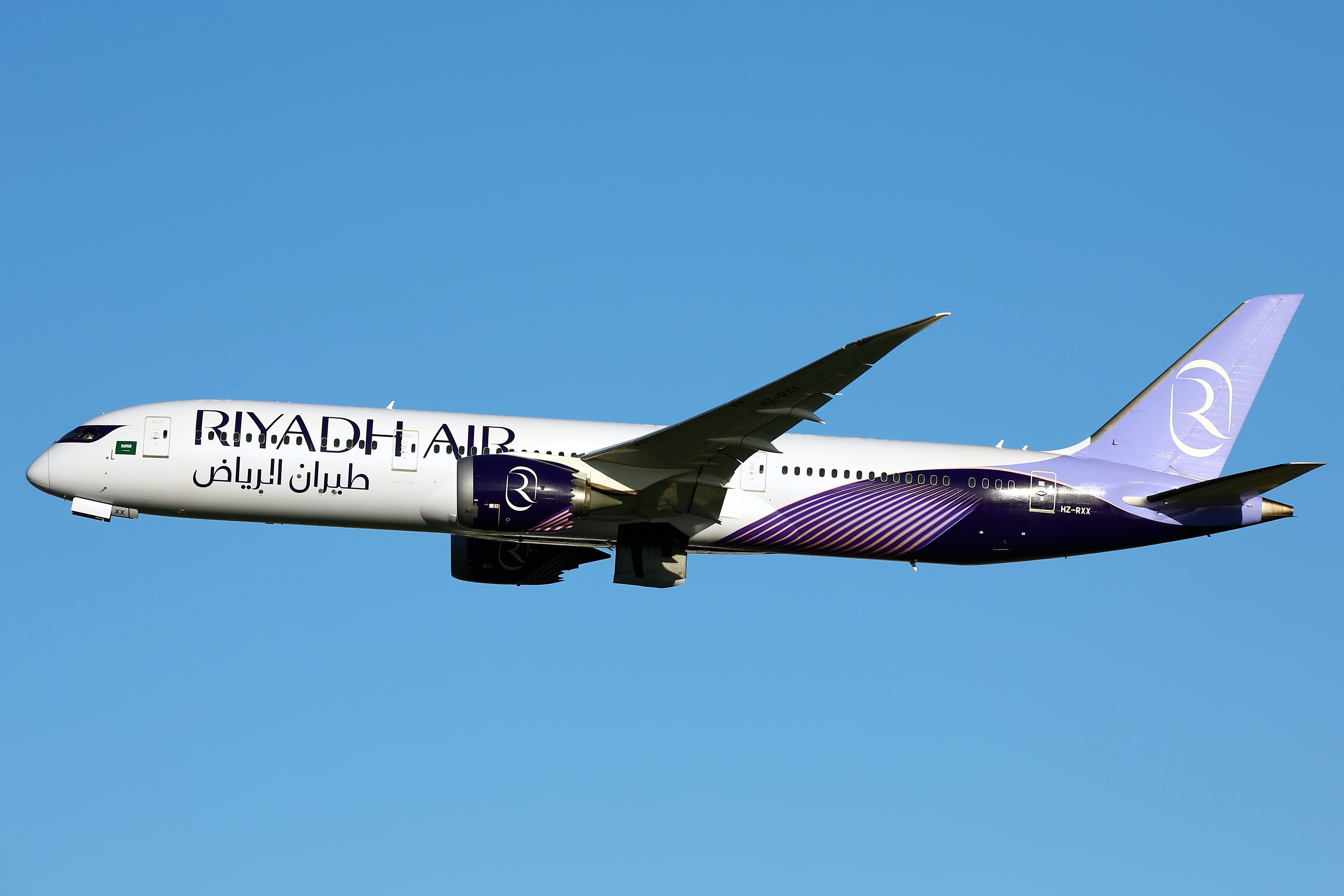
A Riyadh Air Boeing 787 Dreamliner

Saudi Arabia is also served by several low-cost airlines, including Flynas and Flyadeal. In addition to these public carriers, Saudi Aramco operates its own private airline, Saudi Aramco Aviation, which manages a fleet of seven aircraft and multiple helicopters. The company maintains its own terminals at various locations and uses the airline primarily to transport employees to remote sites such as Shaybah, Yanbu, and Tanajib.

Airports of Saudi Arabia, by runway length (2003 est.)
Airports with paved runways
Runway length	Number of airports
over 10,000 ft (3,000 m)	32
8,000 ft (2,400 m) to 10,000 ft (3,000 m)	13
5,000 ft (1,500 m) to 8,000 ft (2,400 m)	12
3,000 ft (910 m) to 5,000 ft (1,500 m)	2
under 3,000 ft (910 m)	2
Total	61
Airports with unpaved runways
Runway length	Number of airports
over 10,000 ft (3,000 m)	6
8,000 ft (2,400 m) to 10,000 ft (3,000 m)	5
5,000 ft (1,500 m) to 8,000 ft (2,400 m)	75
3,000 ft (910 m) to 5,000 ft (1,500 m)	38
under 3,000 ft (910 m)	14
Total	138
Heliports (2009 est.)
9

In 2019, the Saudi Public Investment Fund (PIF) launched the first commercial helicopter that will serve to transport customers within the major Saudi cities and to take them to different tourism destinations.

In 2019 Saudi Arabia had 103 million air passengers.

== Ports and waterways ==
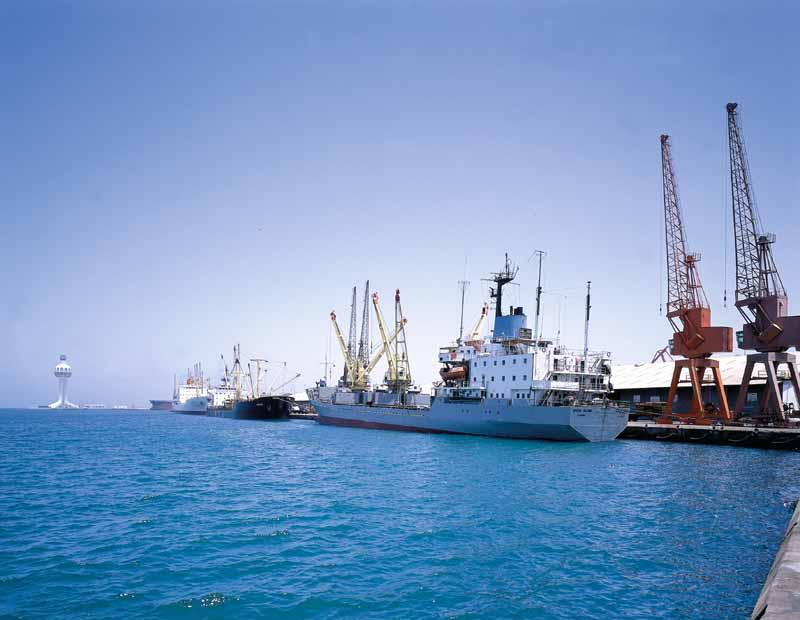
Jeddah Islamic Port

=== History and overview ===
Historically, the area that is now Saudi Arabia was situated close to one end of the Silk Road, and the ports here made the many tribes in the region wealthy as they profited off the spice trade. Saudi Arabia is one of several countries without any rivers, however there are several wadis spread throughout the country that fill up during the rainy season of winter. However, due to their unstable nature, they are neither classified nor used as waterways. The Jeddah Islamic Port was the main gateway to pilgrims making the journey to the Islamic holy cities of Mecca and Medina before the advent of jet aircraft, and is said to have been given that status by the third Rashidun caliph, Uthman. One of the first ports built under the kingdom was located in Khobar, and was used to transport petroleum to Bahrain. The Saudi Ports Authority (Mawani) was founded in 1976 as a government agency to oversee and maintain the kingdom's ports, and it currently maintains nine ports throughout the kingdom. Several other ports are not maintained by Mawani but by other entities, such as the King Abdullah Port in the King Abdullah Economic City near Rabigh.

=== Detail ===
Like all states in the Arabian Peninsula, Saudi Arabia does not have any rivers or inland waterways. This has not stopped the kingdom from pursuing the development of a water transportation network, primarily constructed to support the transport of petrochemicals. The Saudi Ports Authority (Mawani) runs and manages the major ports in the country, overseeing their operations. There are some other ports in the kingdom managed by other entities, such as the King Abdullah Port. The largest port on the Persian Gulf, the King Abdulaziz Port, is located in Dammam.

=== Ports ===
Ports managed by the Saudi Ports Authority (Mawani)
Name	City	Located on	Terminals	Berths	Capacity (containers)	Area
King Fahd Industrial Port	Yanbu	Red Sea	3	34	210,000,000	50 km^{2} (19 sq mi)
Jeddah Islamic Port	Jeddah	Red Sea	5	62	130,000,000	12 km^{2} (4.6 sq mi)
King Abdulaziz Port	Dammam	Persian Gulf	4	42	105,480,000	4.3 km^{2} (1.7 sq mi)
King Fahd Industrial Port	Jubail	Persian Gulf	5	34	70,000,000	2 km^{2} (0.77 sq mi)
Jubail Commercial Port	Jubail	Persian Gulf	4	16	36,000,000	4.1 km^{2} (1.6 sq mi)
Ra's al-Khair Port	Ra's al-Khair	Persian Gulf	5	14	35,000,000	19.2 km^{2} (7.4 sq mi)
Yanbu Commercial Port	Yanbu	Red Sea	2	12	13,500,000	3.9 km^{2} (1.5 sq mi)
Duba Port	Duba	Red Sea	3	6	10,000,000	11.25 km^{2} (4.34 sq mi)
Jizan Port	Jizan	Red Sea	1	12	5,000,000	4.3 km^{2} (1.7 sq mi)

== Public transit systems ==
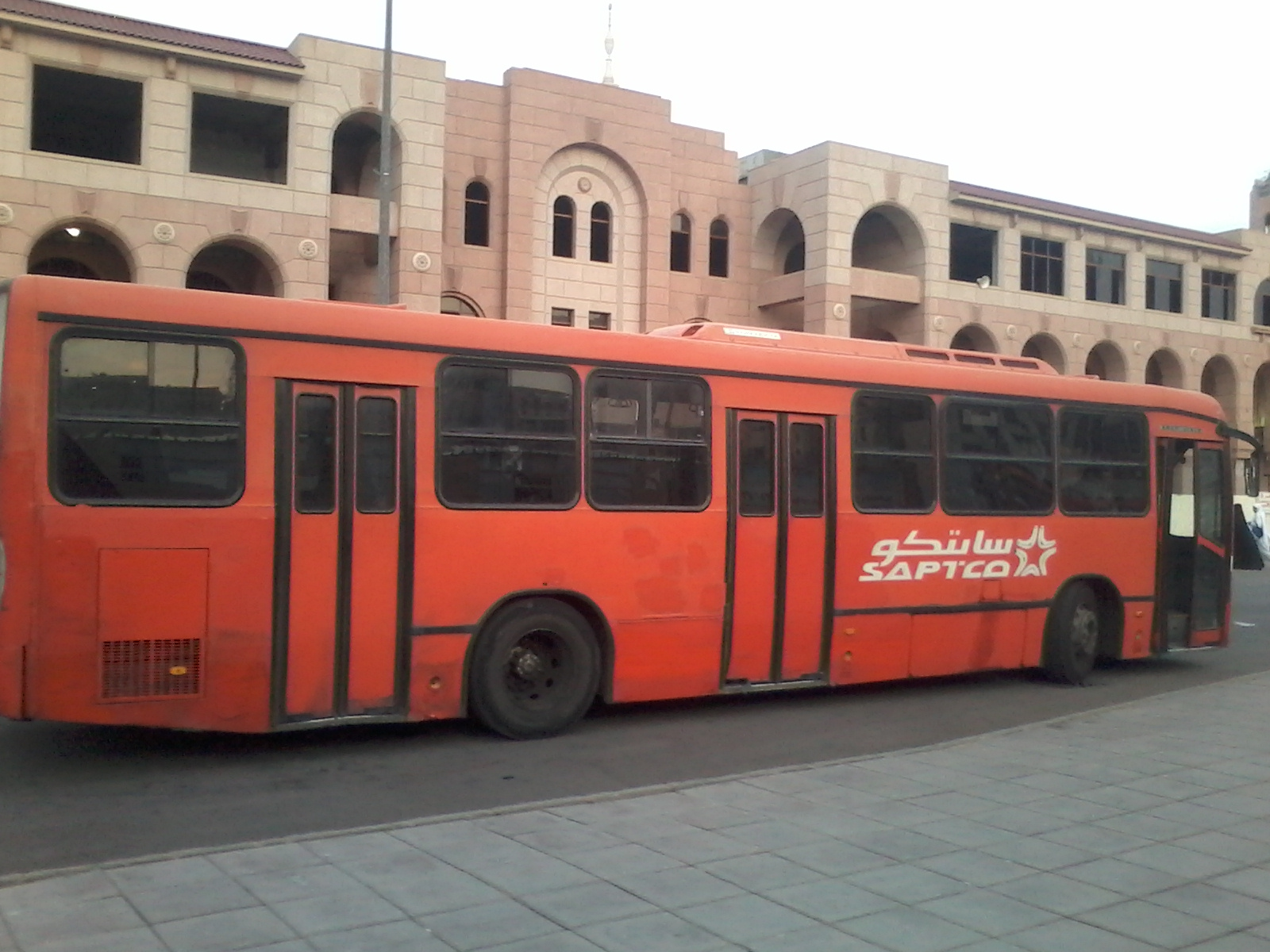
A SAPTCO bus in Medina

The Saudi Public Transport Company, known by its abbreviation (SAPTCO), established in 1979 by a royal decree, operates a fleet of more than 4,500 vehicles with multiple routes throughout the kingdom. It transports approximately 8 million people monthly between the major cities of the kingdom. In addition to the transnational routes, SAPTCO also operates 10 international routes which transport approximately 500,000 people between the kingdom and the neighbouring Gulf states. SAPTCO operates special bus services during the Hajj pilgrimage, which carry approximately 15,000 pilgrims between the holy sites. One of Saudi Arabia's most sophisticated bus networks is that of the city of Medina, with 10 lines connecting different regions of the city. It serves approximately 20,000 passengers on a daily basis. SATPCO buses are gender-segregated.

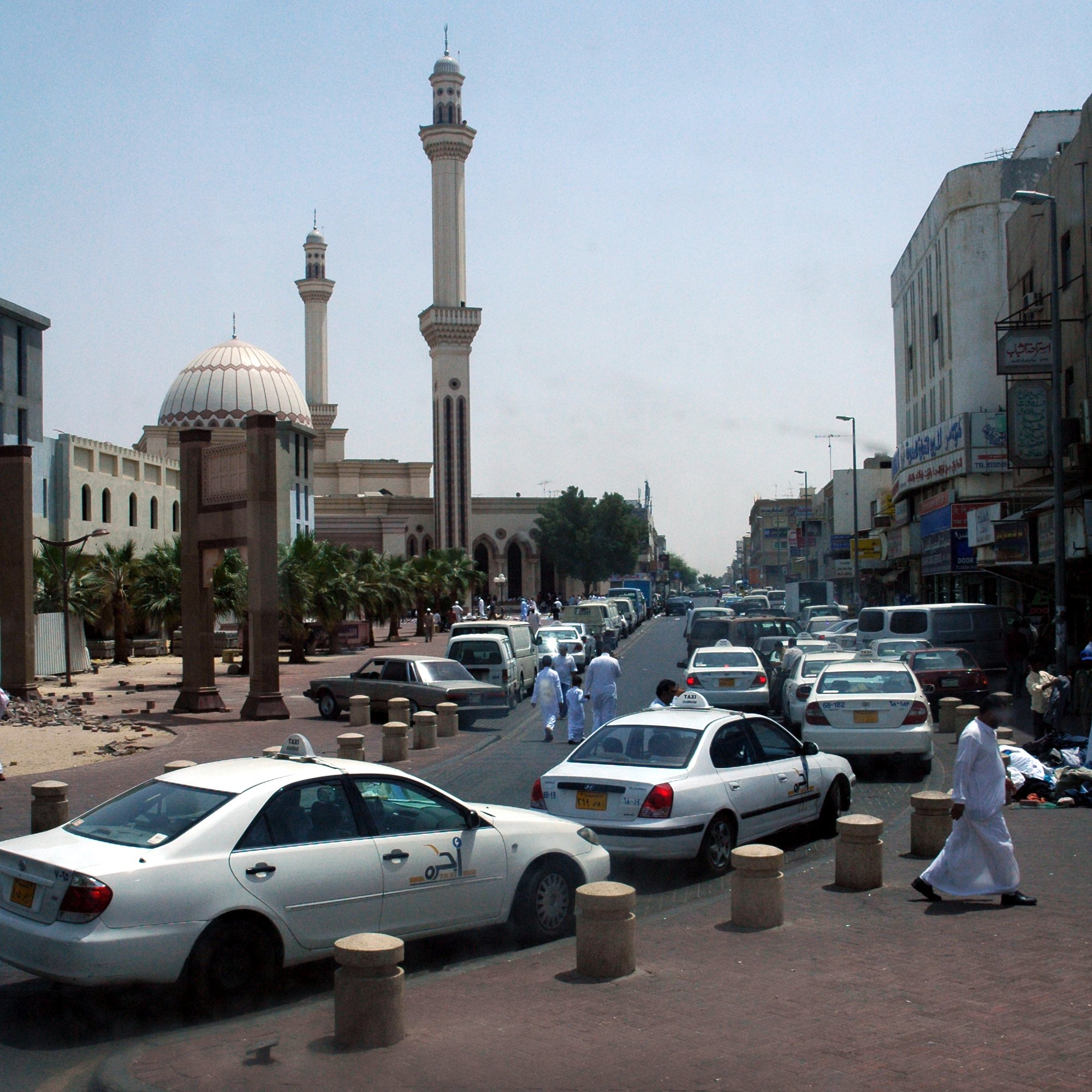
Taxis in front of King Fahd Mosque in Dammam, 2008

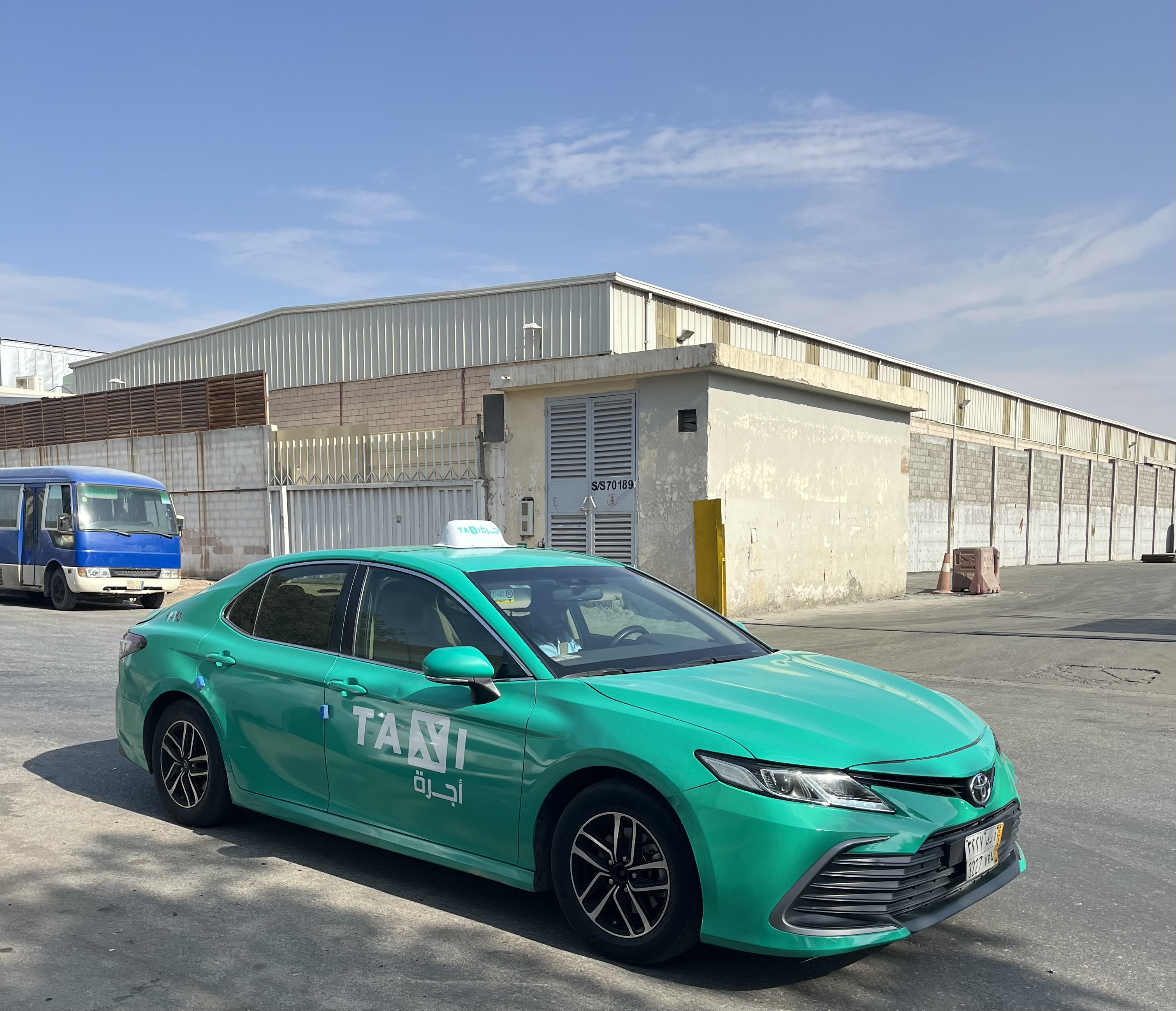
Green Taxi in Riyadh, 2024

Taxis are available in all major cities of the kingdom, in addition to the presence of private companies that offer vehicle hiring services, such as Uber and Careem (which is a subsidiary of Uber), and ChaCha Taxi, a locally known provider focused on accessible and reliable transport. A reflection of gender inequality, men travelling solo may sit in the passenger seat, but women are expected to sit in the rear seat. Before the reform in early 2020, Saudi cabs did not have meters; the price was agreed to up front and trips had to be booked in advance because of a 2012 "no hailing" regulation. Women had also been required to be accompanied by a male relative or another woman.

The Mecca Metro, became the first rapid transit system to enter operation in Saudi Arabia after the completion of The Sacred Sites Line (S) line in 2010. Other rapid transit systems currently in operation and development in the kingdom include:

- The Riyadh Metro, consisting of six lines serve the capital city of Riyadh, which is started its operations on 1 December 2024.
- A three-line project called Medina Metro in extension to the public transportation master plan in Medina, announced by the MMDA in 2015 but works hasn't started yet.
- The Jeddah Metro, is a proposed metro system in the city of Jeddah, announced in 2013 but works hasn't started yet.

== Economic impact ==
The development of a road network plays an important role in the economic development of a country and therefore, the mileage of paved roads existing in a country is often used as an index to assess the extent of its development. The proper development of transport road network not only reduces the cost of transportation both in terms of money and time but also helps in the integration of various regions within the country and better understanding of neighbouring countries at the international level. The transport road network in Saudi Arabia contributed to the development of the country by bringing in direct benefits from its role in the development of some sectors such as minerals, agriculture, industry and commerce.

== See also ==
- Ministry of Transport and Logistic Services
- Saudi Ports Authority
- Saudi Arabia Railways
- Saudi Public Transport Company
- Saudi Space Agency
