= Ministry of Transport and Logistic Services =

Government ministry of Saudi Arabia

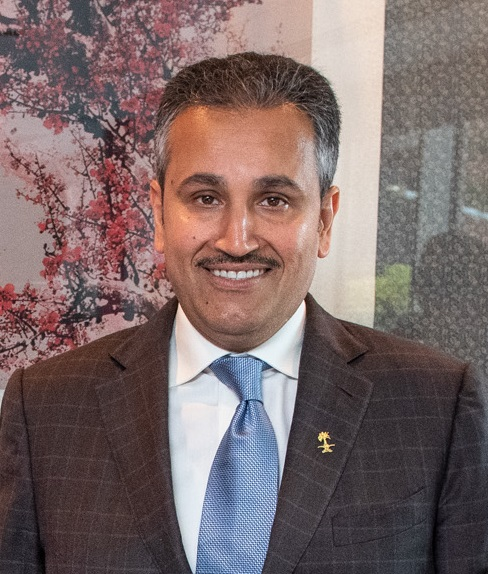
- Saleh Al-Jasser, the current minister since 23 October 2019

Ministerial Department overview
- Formed: 24 December 1953; 72 years ago
- Jurisdiction: Government of Saudi Arabia
- Headquarters: Riyadh
- Minister responsible: Saleh Al-Jasser
- Child agencies: Roads General Authority; Saudi Ports Authority; General Authority of Civil Aviation; National Transportation Safety Center; Saudi Arabia Railways
- Website: Official English Website

The Ministry of Transport and Logistic Services (Arabic: وزارة النقل والخدمات اللوجستية), formerly the Ministry of Transport (Arabic: وزارة النقل; MoT), is a government ministry in Saudi Arabia. It is responsible for all aspects of transport, including roads, railways, and ports.

== History ==
=== Establishment and early development (1953–1975) ===
The ministry was established in 1953 under the name Ministry of Transportation, with the primary responsibility of supervising transport affairs in the Kingdom’s early stages of development. Following a government-wide administrative reorganization in 1975, its mandate was expanded to include planning, designing, constructing, and maintaining the national network of roads and bridges. During this period, specialized functions such as port management and railway operations were transitioned to independent authorities.

=== Institutional expansion (2003–2021) ===
In 2003, the ministry was renamed the Ministry of Transport. Its role evolved from purely infrastructure development to include regulation and licensing of the land and maritime transport sectors. In 2016, following the launch of Saudi Vision 2030, the ministry’s oversight was further broadened to include the air transport sector, and the Minister of Transport was appointed Chairman of the General Authority of Civil Aviation (GACA).

=== Strategic transformation and logistics (2021–present) ===
On 29 June 2021, the Council of Ministers approved the renaming of the organization to the Ministry of Transport and Logistic Services (MOTLS). This rebranding was central to the National Transport and Logistics Strategy (NTLS), which aims to position Saudi Arabia as a global logistics hub connecting three continents.

On 2 August 2022, the government established the General Authority for Roads as an independent regulatory body under the minister’s supervision, separating the ministry’s legislative responsibilities from road construction operations. By 2025, the ministry had overseen the establishment of 59 new logistics centers across the Kingdom and significantly improved Saudi Arabia’s standing in the World Bank’s Logistics Performance Index.

== List of Ministers ==
#	Minister	Took office	Left office
1	Talal bin Abdulaziz	24 December 1953	5 November 1955
2	Sultan bin Abdulaziz	5 November 1955	21 December 1960
3	Badr bin Abdulaziz	21 December 1960	16 August 1961
4	Mohammed Tawfiq	31 October 1962	13 October 1975
5	Hussein Al-Mansouri	13 October 1975	2 August 1995
6	Nasser Al-Saloum	2 August 1995	1 May 2003
7	Jabbara Al-Juhani	1 May 2003	8 December 2014
8	Abdullah Al-Muqbel	8 December 2014	7 May 2016
9	Sulaiman Al-Hamdan	7 May 2016	4 October 2017
10	Nabil Al-Amoudi	4 October 2017	23 October 2019
11	Saleh Al-Jasser	23 October 2019	Incumbent

== See also ==
- Ministries of Saudi Arabia
- Transport in Saudi Arabia
