= Mastura =

Mastura is a name.

== People with the given name ==
- Mastura Mohd Yazid, Malaysian politician
- Siti Mastura Muhammad (born 1989), Malaysian politician

== People with the surname ==
- Amy Mastura (born 1971), Malaysian singer and actress
- Dimple Mastura (born 1990), Filipino politician
- Michael Mastura (born 1941), Filipino lawyer, author and lecturer
- Rusdy Mastura (born 1950), Indonesian politician
- Tucao Mastura, Filipino politician

== Places ==
- Sultan Mastura, Maguindanao del Norte, Philippines

== See also ==
- Masturah
