= Highway 10 (Saudi Arabia) =

Road in Saudi Arabia

Highway 10

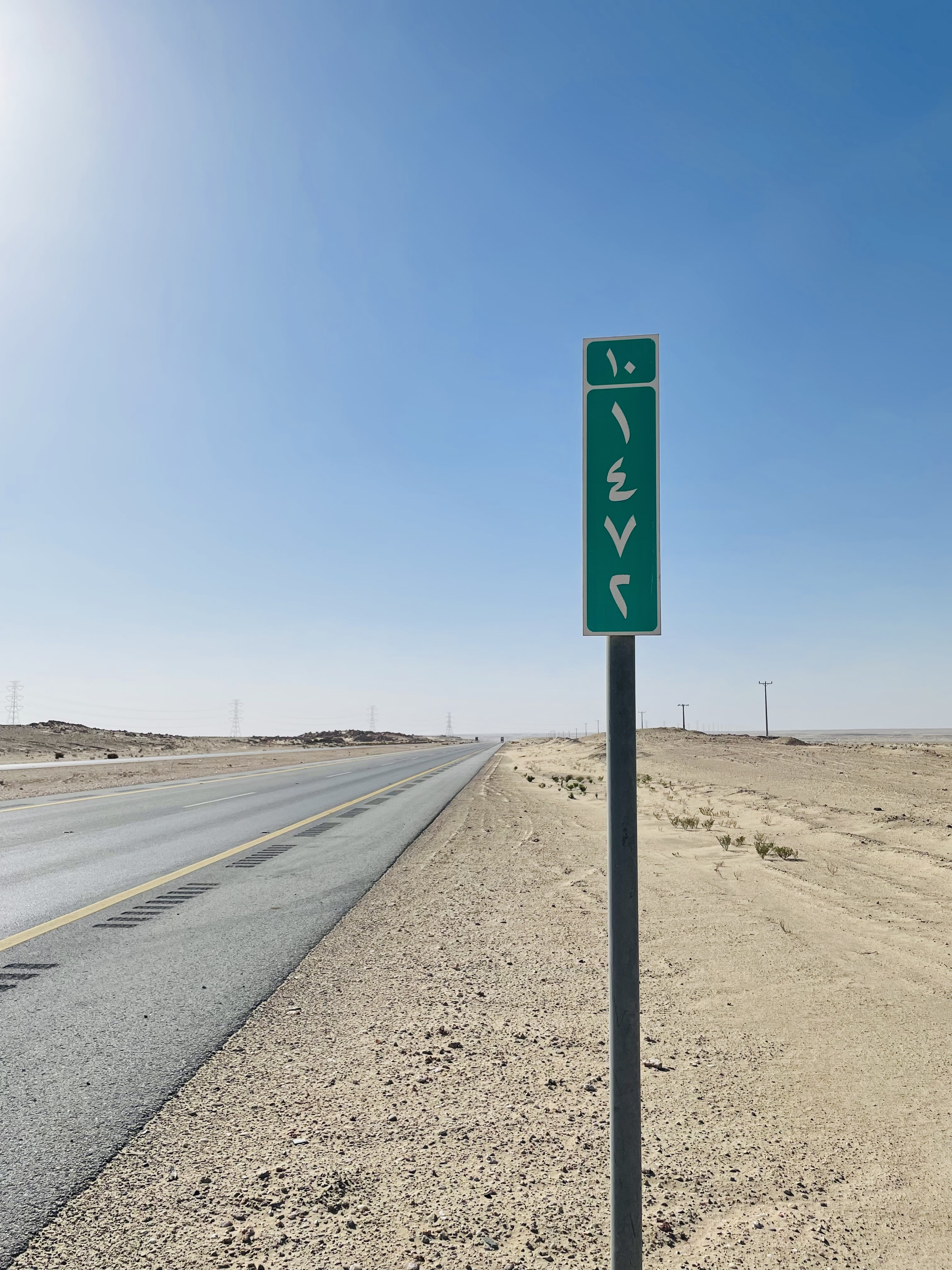
- Kilometer marker 1472 (2022)

Route information
- Length: 1,480 km (920 mi)

Location
- Country: Saudi Arabia
- Provinces: Jazan, 'Asir, Riyadh, Eastern

Highway system
- Transport in Saudi Arabia

Highway 10 is a highway in Saudi Arabia, stretching from Ad Darb in Al Darb Governorate to the Saudi–UAE border near the Persian Gulf. The highway is 1,480 kilometers (920 mi) long.

The highway became famous for its straight section that is 240 kilometers (150 mi) long between Haradh and Al Batha, and has no bends or noticeable gradients, earning it the world record for the longest straight road.

== History ==
The 240-kilometer (150 mi) straight section of Saudi Arabia's Highway 10 has emerged as the world's longest straight road, surpassing the 146-kilometer (91 mi) straight section of Australia's Eyre Highway.

The highway cuts through the vast Rub' al Khali desert, also known as the Empty Quarter. The road was originally built as a private road for King Fahd of Saudi Arabia.

== See also ==
- Transport in Saudi Arabia
- List of Saudi highway routes
