= Quds Street =

Road in Qatif, Saudi Arabia

Quds Street is a commercial street in the city of Qatif in the Eastern Province of Saudi Arabia. It extends from Uhod Road in the north to Enak in the south.

== Features ==
The street is 4.5 kilometers long (2.8 miles) and 30 meters wide. The speed limit differs depending on the area; the northern area is limited to 60 km/h while the limit in the southern area is up to 80 km/h.

Many of the main shops and banks in Qatif are located there, since it is considered the main commercial street of the city. The shops include Mazaya food, farm store and many car dealers. A new 10-storey medical tower is being built, making it the highest building in Qatif. Restaurants including Domino's Pizza and Baskin-Robbins are located on the street.

== See also ==
- Transport in Saudi Arabia
