= Thuwal =

Thuwal ثُوَل
- Village
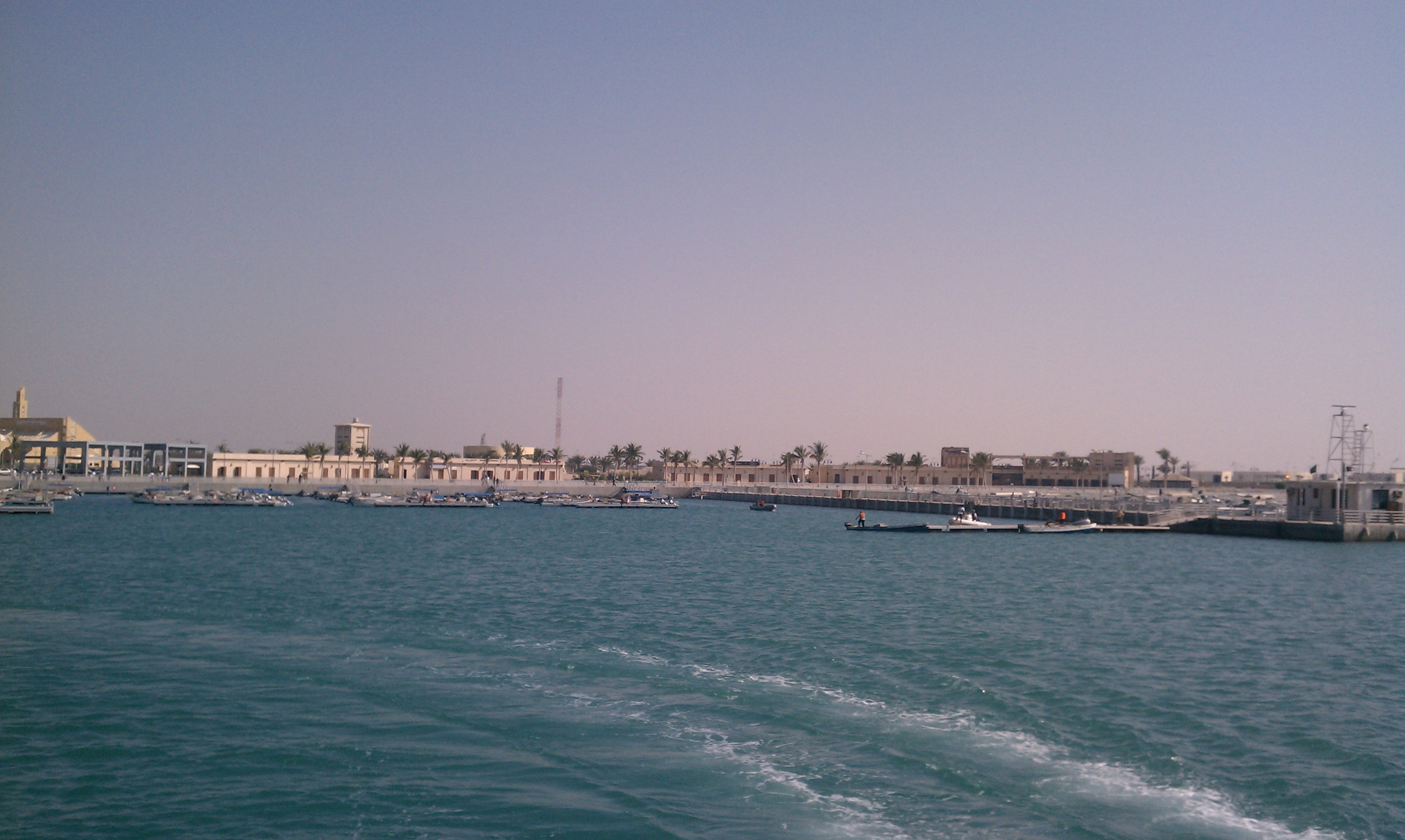
- Thuwal coast guard port

- Location within Saudi Arabia
- Coordinates: 22°17′N 39°06′E
- Country: Saudi Arabia
- Province: Makkah Province
- Governorate: Jeddah
- Elevation: 1 m (3.3 ft)
- Area code: +966-13-8

Thuwal (Arabic: ثُوَل) is a coastal village in Jeddah Governorate, Makkah Province, Saudi Arabia, situated along the coast of Red Sea in the Hejaz region. Thuwal is 30 kilometres (19 mi) south of King Abdullah Economic City and 80 kilometres (50 mi) north of Jeddah.

== Overview ==
Thuwal had long been a fishing center until the Royal Saudi Navy reconstructed the village.

Thuwal hosts the King Abdullah University of Science and Technology (KAUST), which officially opened in September 2009.

The town is also experiencing an increase in business due to its proximity to the King Abdullah Economic City and King Abdullah University of Science and Technology (KAUST). Thuwal attracts seafood lovers to its fish restaurants.

== Transport ==
Thuwal is connected by Highway 60 to Rabigh and Yanbu.

== KAUST university ==
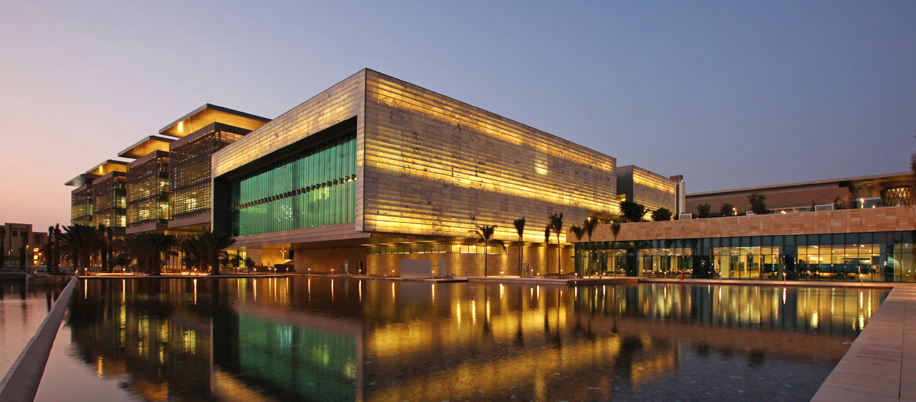
KAUST's campus at night

Thuwal is the home of King Abdullah University of Science and Technology (KAUST)

(Arabic:جامعة الملك عبدالله للعلوم والتقنية jāmiʿat al-malik ʿabd al-Lāh li-l-ʿulūm wa-t-teqniyya), a private research university which was founded in 2009. The university provides research and graduate training programs in English as the official language of instruction.

== See also ==
- Dahaban
