= Al Qadimah =

- Village
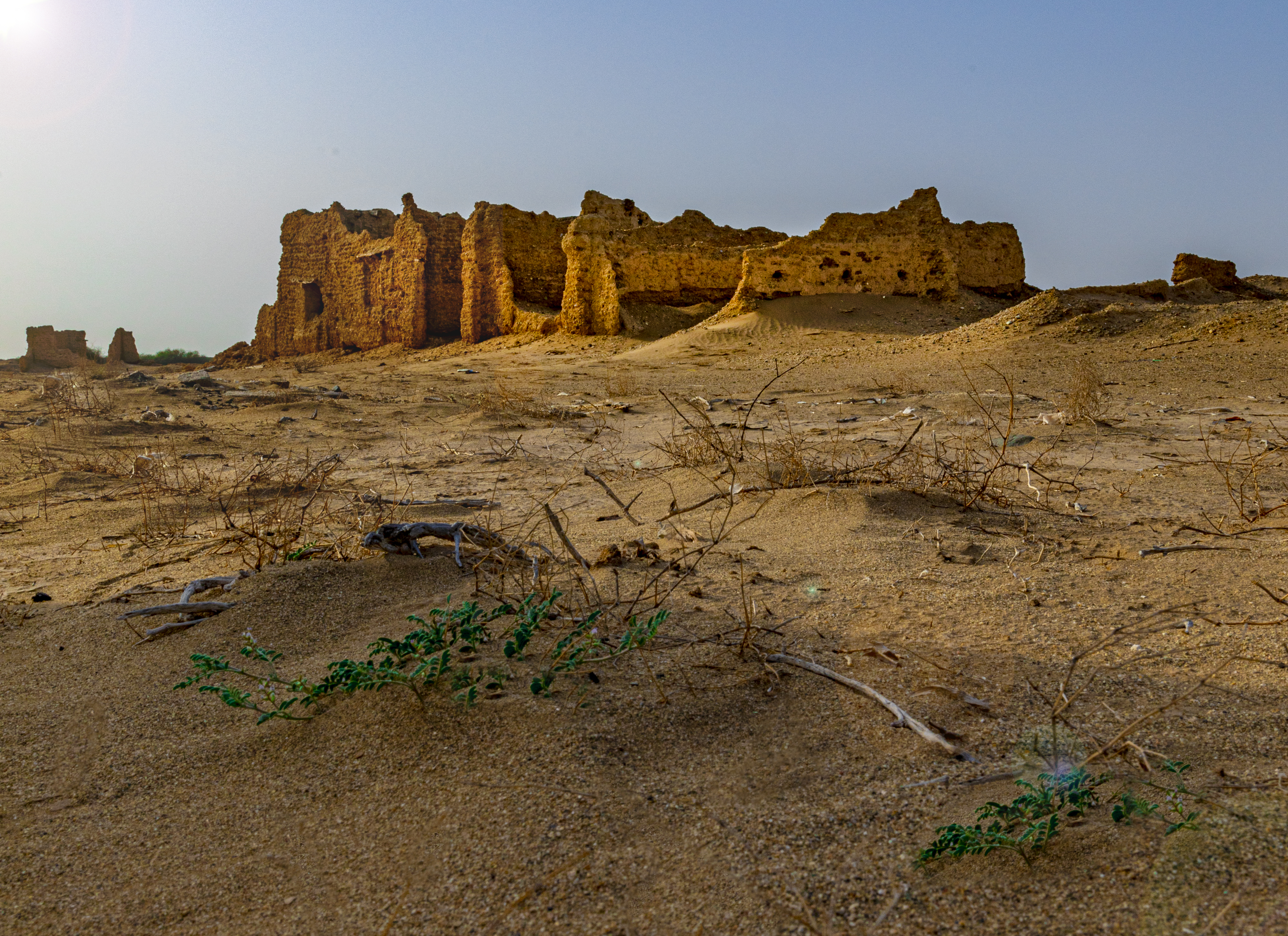

- Location in Saudi Arabia
- Coordinates: 22°21′N 39°09′E
- Country: Saudi Arabia
- Province: Makkah Province
- Time zone: UTC+3 (EAT)
  - Summer (DST): UTC+3 (EAT)

Al Qadimah (Arabic: القضيمة) is a village in Makkah Province, on the western coast of Saudi Arabia.

It is 94 kilometers north of Jeddah. Along with Thual, it hosts the new economic city project, King Abdullah University of Science and Technology (KAUST).

Al Qadimah's coast faces several islands which belong to King Fahd's private properties.

== See also ==
- List of cities and towns in Saudi Arabia
- Regions of Saudi Arabia
