= Highway 60 (Saudi Arabia) =

Road in Saudi Arabia

Highway 60

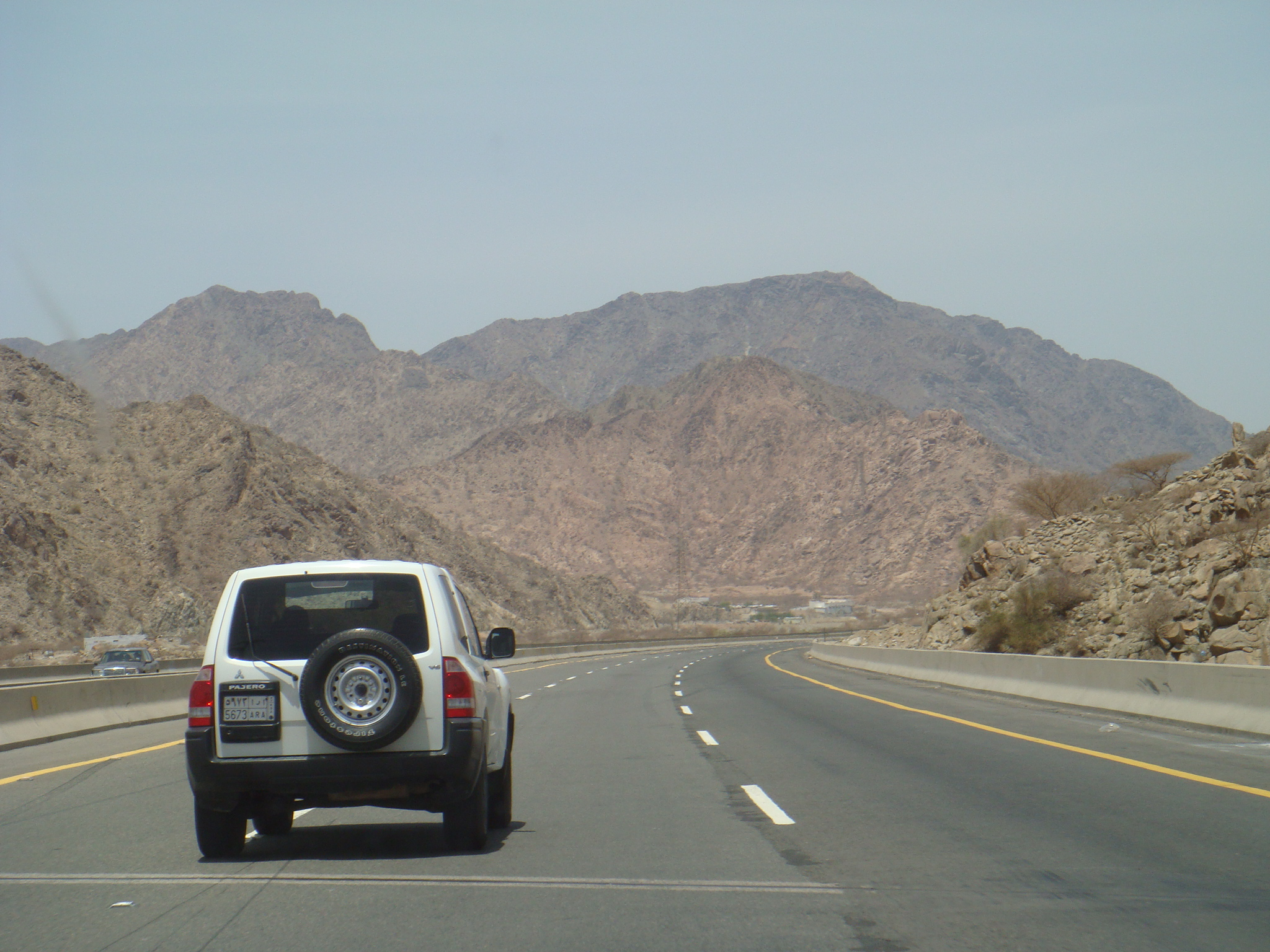
- Highway 60 passing through mountains near Ta'if in the Hejaz

Location
- Country: Saudi Arabia

Highway system
- Transport in Saudi Arabia

Highway 60 is a major road in the Kingdom of Saudi Arabia. It connects the cities of Al-Qassim Region, Medina, Yanbu, Rabigh and Thuwal. The construction was completed in 2005 at a total cost of approximately 3.30 million Riyals. With a length of 812 kilometres (505 miles), it is one of the longest highways ever built by the Ministry of Transportation. Highway 60 is important for tourism and pilgrimage.

The length of the route from Al-Qasim to Medina is 450 kilometres (280 miles), and the length from the latter to Yanbu is 164 kilometres (102 miles). On the other hand, the distance from Yanbu to Rabigh and Thuwal is 198 kilometres (123 miles).

== See also ==
- Transport in Saudi Arabia
