= Dahaban =

Ancient village north of Jeddah, Saudi Arabia

Coordinates: 21°56′N 39°07′E

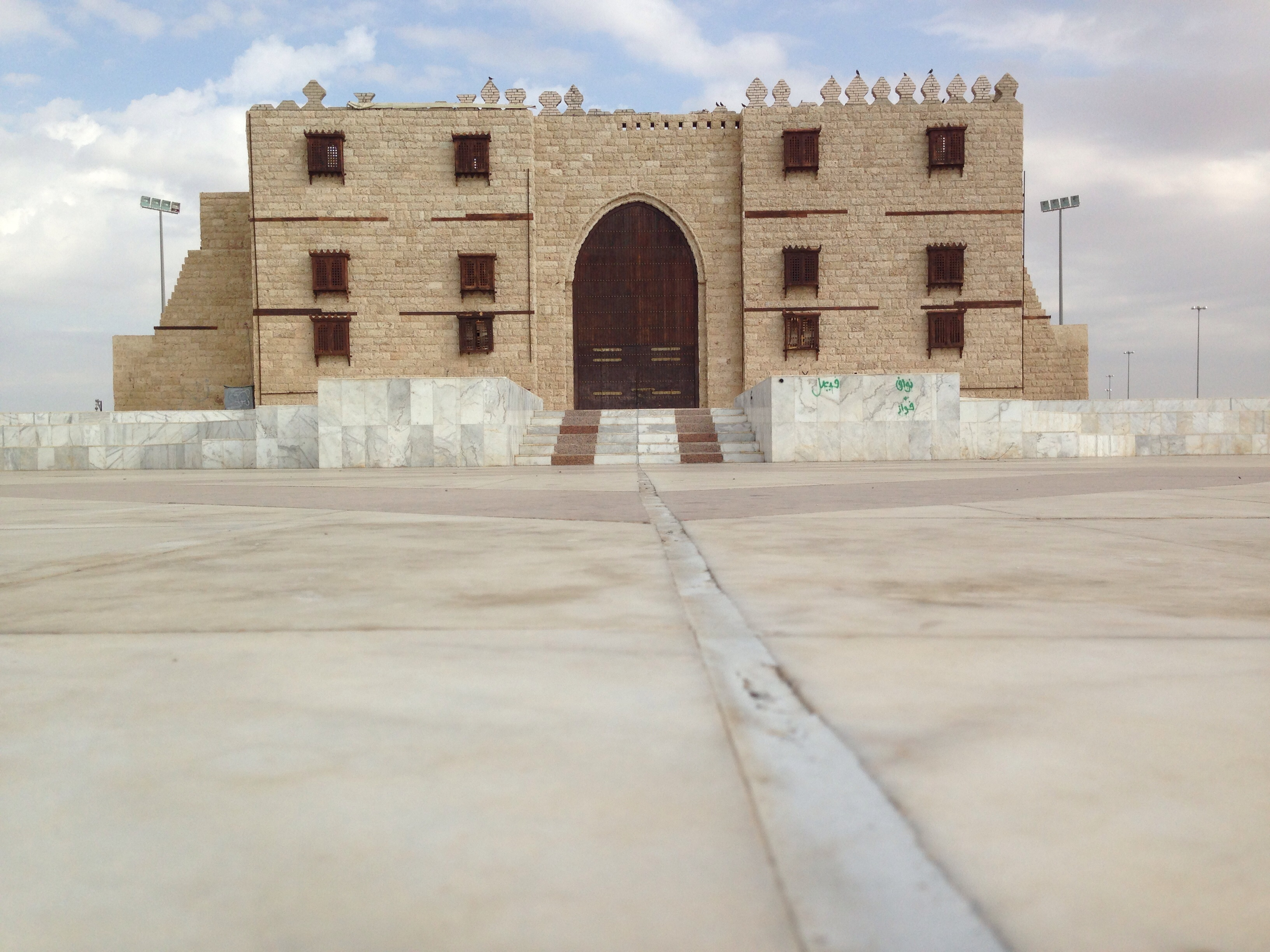
Old building in Dahban

Dahban or Dahaban (Arabic: ذهبان) is an ancient village on the coast of Saudi Arabia (Red Sea). It is in Makkah Province, a few kilometers north of Jeddah.

For a long time, Dahban was a fishing center until Durrat Al-Arus opened in 1996, which made it also a tourist village. Dahaban lies on the main highway running along the west coast of Saudi Arabia between Jeddah and Rabigh. Dahaban has now turned into a picnic spot for families to visit fresh fish restaurants and in 2015, the first marine park was inaugurated, which attracted visitors.

== See also ==
- Dhahban Central Prison
- Jeddah
