= Saleh bin Nasser Al-Jasser =

Saudi Arabia's Minister of transport

His Excellency Saleh bin Nasser Al-Jasser
- صالح بن ناصر الجاسر
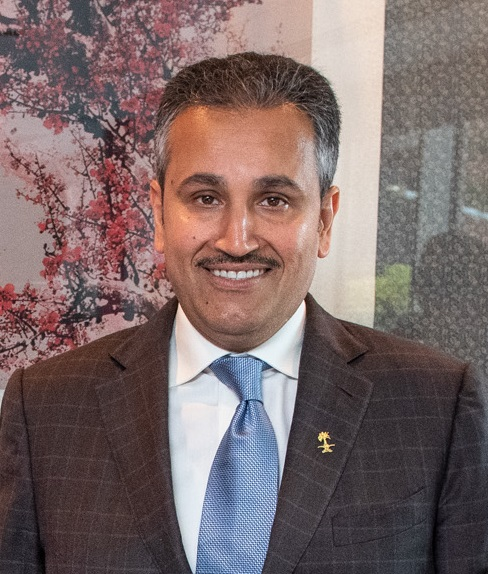
- Al-Jasser in 2021

Minister of Transport and Logistic Services
- Incumbent
- Assumed office 23 October 2019
- Monarch: Salman
- Prime Minister: Salman (2019–2022); Mohammed bin Salman (2022–present)
- Preceded by: Nabil Al-Amoudi

Director-General of Saudia
- In office August 2014 – 23 October 2019

Personal details
- Born: 25 October 1965 (age 60) Saudi Arabia
- Education: King Abdulaziz University; King Saud University

Saleh bin Nasser Al-Jasser (born 25 October 1965) is Saudi Arabia's Minister of Transport, appointed by a royal decree on 23 October 2019.

== Education and career ==
Al-Jasser holds a bachelor's degree from King Abdulaziz University in Jeddah in Industrial Engineering. He also obtained both a master's degree and MBA from King Saud University in Riyadh.

He was the director-general of Saudi Arabian Airlines from August 2014 to October 2019. He also was chief executive officer of National Shipping Co of Saudi Arabia from November 2010 to June 2014. Previously, he has been on the board of the Saudi Research and Marketing Group, Arabia Insurance Cooperative, Etihad Etisalat Co, Saudi Airlines Catering Co, and Saudia Aerospace Engineering Industries.

== See also ==
- Council of Ministers of Saudi Arabia
- Ministry of Transport (Saudi Arabia)
