= Roads General Authority =

Saudi government agency

General Authority of Roads
- الهيئة العامة للطرق

Agency overview
- Formed: August 2, 2022; 4 years ago
- Jurisdiction: Government of Saudi Arabia
- Headquarters: Riyadh, Saudi Arabia
- Parent department: Ministry of Transport and Logistic Services
- Website: rga.gov.sa

General Authority for Roads (Arabic: الهيئة العامة للطرق), or Roads General Authority (RGA), is a regulatory authority under Saudi Arabia's Ministry of Transport and Logistic Services that is responsible for overseeing the country's construction, operation and maintenance of roads. It was established in accordance with the National Transport and Logistics Strategy by the Cabinet of Saudi Arabia in August 2022.
