= Tanajib =

Oil complex owned by the Saudi Arabian Oil Company

Coordinates: 27.317°N 48.867°E

Tanajib (Arabic: تناجيب) is an oil complex owned by the Saudi Arabian Oil Company (Saudi Aramco), located on the coast of the Persian Gulf, about 200 km north of Dammam in the Eastern Province of Saudi Arabia. The main work facilities are the Tanajib Gas Plant, and small offices nearby.

== Facilities ==
Just like other Saudi Aramco's complexes such as Safaniyah, Abu Hadriyah. it contains all necessary infrastructure. This is mostly surrounded by water by the ocean. The area is mostly surrounded by the Saudi Aramco facilities and employees only.

The Tanajib desalination plant supplied 1.8 million liters of water per day during the Gulf War.

=== Accommodation ===
A small gated all-male residential area is available for the employees only. Another camp less equipped than the first is located 3 km away for contractor workers.

=== Health care ===
A small clinic is located 500 meters west to the main residential camp.

== Transportation ==
=== Port Tanajib ===
Port, operated by Saudi Aramco is base for vessels supplying oilfield facilities. Port doesn't serve commercial traffic.

There are 24 berths, total length 1.5 km.

=== Airport ===
Tanajib Airport was built by the company for its exclusive use to transport employees and goods between Tanajib and other cities.

=== Highway ===
Tanajib is accessible via the Abu Hadriyah Highway.
