= Rabigh =

Rabigh رَابِغ Al-Juḥfah ٱلْجُحْفَة
- City
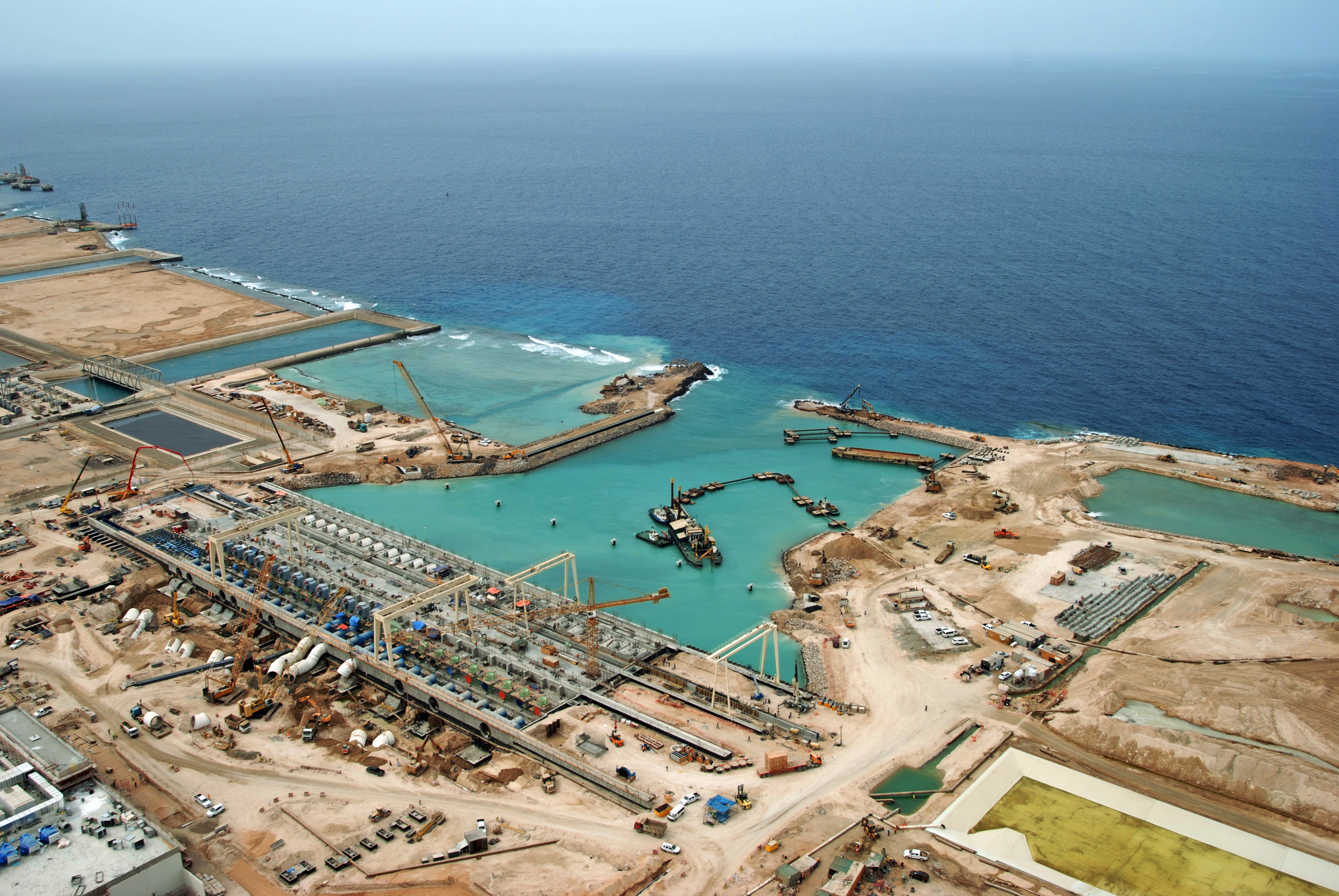
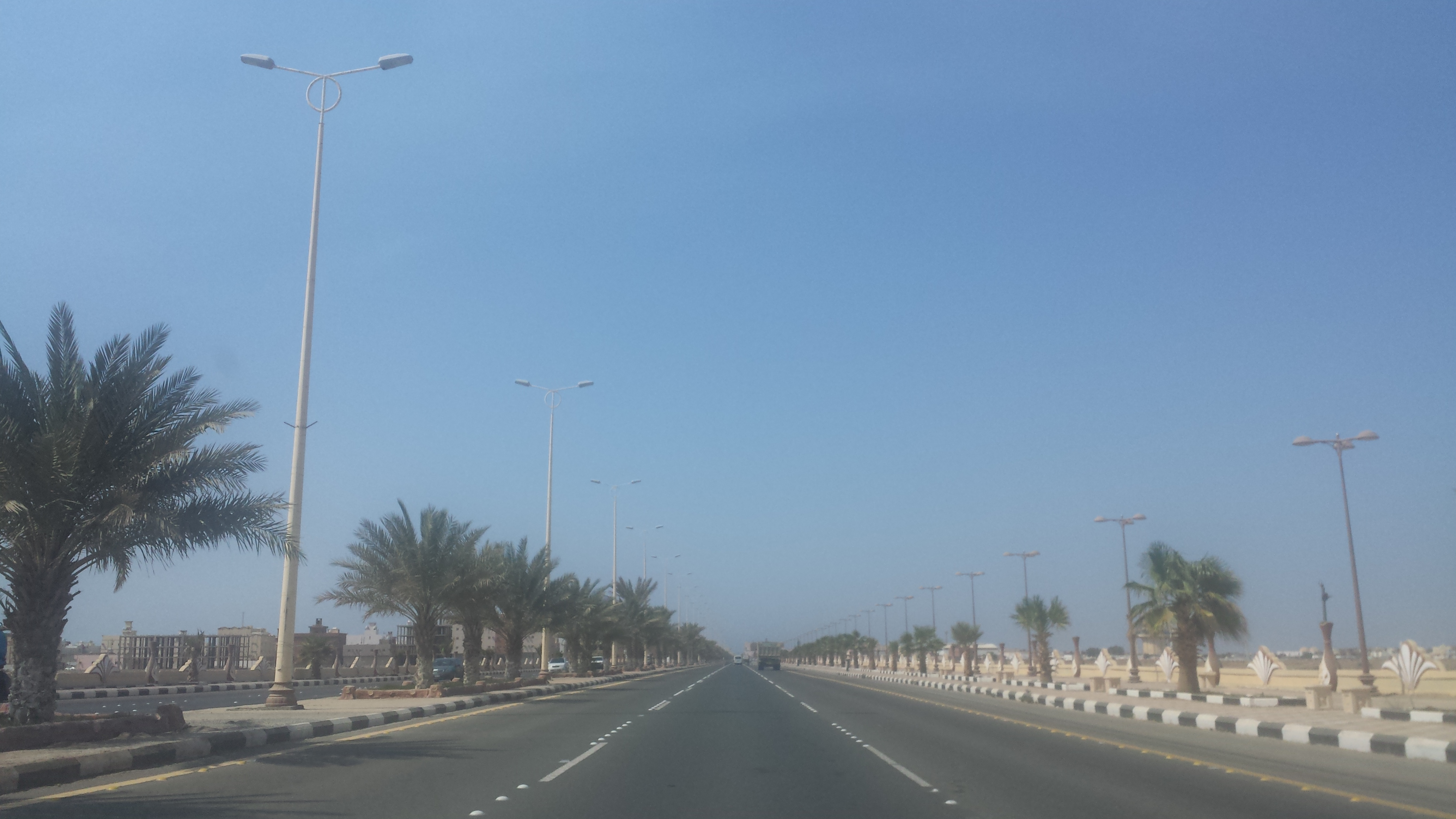

- Location in Saudi Arabia Rabigh (Middle East) Rabigh (West and Central Asia)
- Coordinates: 22°48′N 39°02′E
- Country: Saudi Arabia
- Province: Makkah
- Governorate: Rabigh

Government
  - Governor: Khalid al-Ghanmi

Area
  - Governorate: 6,679.03 km^{2} (2,578.79 sq mi)
  - Municipality: 1,400 km^{2} (540 sq mi)
- Elevation: 13 m (43 ft)

Population (1435 AH)
  - Total: 104,621
  - Estimate (2014): 180,352
- Time zone: UTC+3 (AST)
- Website: www.makkah.gov.sa/page/rabigh

Rabigh (Arabic: رَابِغ, romanized: Rābigh) is a city and governorate in the Province of Makkah of the Kingdom of Saudi Arabia, situated on the coast of the Red Sea, around 208 km (129 miles) northwest of Mecca in the historic Hejazi region. The city had an estimated population of 180,352 in 2014 and is situated at an elevation of 13 m (43 ft) above sea level, close to the border with the Madinah Province. The city dates back to the era before the advent of Islam in the 7th century C.E., and up to the 17th century, was known as Al-Juhfah, or Al-Johfah (Arabic: ٱلْجُحْفَة, romanized: Al-Juḥfah).

Due to the strategic location of Rabigh on the Red Sea, it has been the site of several high-profile projects such as the King Abdullah University of Science and Technology, Petro Rabigh and King Abdullah Economic City. The Rabigh Governorate is divided into 5 marākiz (مَرَاكِز, centres), Rabigh, Nuweiba, Abwa', Mastoura and al-Qadimah. It is governed by Governor Khalid al-Ghanmi.

== History ==
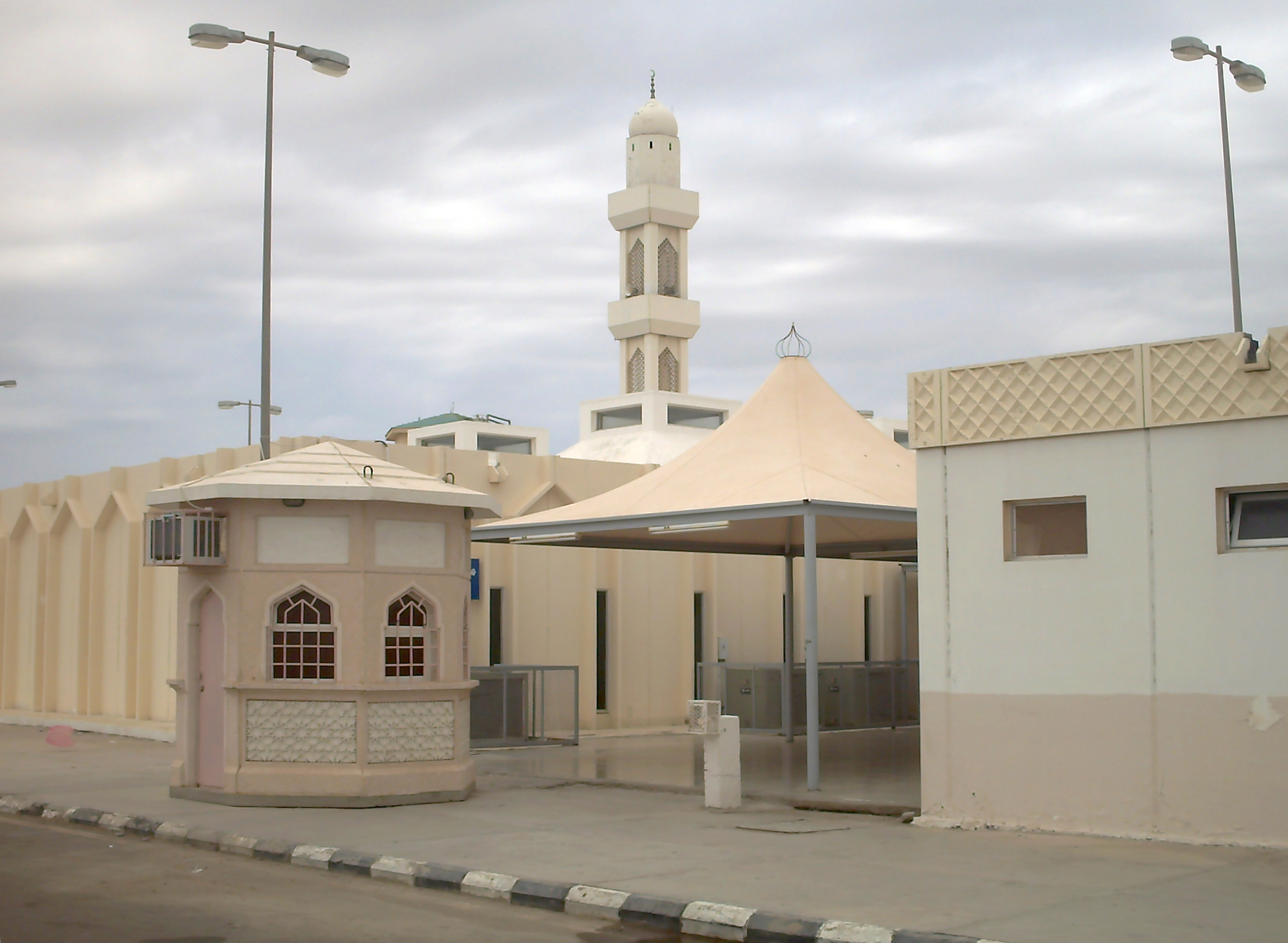
Masjid Miqat Al-Juhfah, Wadi Rabigh

The historical importance of the city is driven by the fact that it was a stopover for Hajj and Umrah pilgrims coming from Egypt and the Levant, as defined by the Islamic prophet Muhammad. The city was also located along pre-Islamic caravan routes between Yemen and the Levant. As a coastal town, fishing was the main source of income for the people of Rabigh, until the discovery of oil.

Rabigh is known to have existed before the advent of Islam. Even up to the 17th century, the area in and around the city was known by its old name, al-Juhfah, also spelt al-Johfah. During the time of Muhammad, Rabigh was a frequent site of raids by Muslims on the Meccan caravans that passed through the region. It has been recorded Sahih Bukhari that Muhammad defined Al-Juhfah as the miqat for pilgrims arriving for Hajj and Umrah from Egypt and the Levant.

=== Ubaydah's expedition ===
According to Islamic historical sources, in April 623 CE, Muhammad sent Ubaydah ibn al-Harith with a party of sixty armed Muhajirun to the baṭn (Arabic: بَطْن, lit. 'valley') of Rabigh. They expected to intercept a Qurayshi caravan that was returning from Ash-Shaam, under the protection of Abu Sufyan ibn Harb and 200 armed riders. The Muslim party travelled as far as the wells at Thanyat al-Murra, where Sa'ad ibn Abi Waqqas shot an arrow at the Quraysh. This is known as the first arrow of Islam. Despite this surprise attack, "they did not unsheath a sword or approach one another," and the Muslims returned empty-handed; however, two Meccan traders left their caravan, became Muslim, and went with the expedition back to Medina.

=== Modern history ===
With the discovery of oil in Saudi Arabia and the completion of the East–West pipeline, Saudi Aramco chose Rabigh to be the site of their new refinery and port. Construction on the Rabigh refinery began in 1981, during the reign of King Fahd. The joint venture between Saudi Aramco and Japan's Sumitomo Chemical, the $10-billion Rabigh Refining and Petrochemical Company, also known as Petro Rabigh, was founded in 2005. It is currently the second-largest integrated oil refinery and petrochemical production facility in Saudi Arabia.

Most other projects in and around Rabigh were built under King Abdullah and are thus named for him, such as the King Abdullah University of Science and Technology, an international, graduate-level research university. Founded in 2009, it is the first co-educational university campus in Saudi Arabia; and the King Abdullah Economic City, facilitated by the Saudi Arabian General Investment Authority, construction of which began in 2005. The project is being developed by Emaar, a Tadawul-listed company first established to develop KAEC. The King Abdullah Port, one Saudi Arabia's largest ports, is situated in the city, and was inaugurated on 11 February 2019.

On January 6th 2025 a tornado struck the region, which was reported by Gulf News to be the strongest ever recorded in the coastal region of Saudi Arabia. The National Centre of Meteorology discussed plans to further research the tornado.

== Demographics ==
Population

Historical population
Year	Pop.	±% p.a.
2004	68,538	—
2010	93,097	+5.24%
2022	112,383	+1.58%

Between the 2010 and 2022 censuses, the population of Rābigh Governorate rose from 93,097 to 112,383, an increase of roughly 20.7 % (about 1.6 % per year).

== Transport ==
Highway 5, Saudi Arabia's westernmost north-south highway, runs through Rabigh, providing access to Yanbu, Umluj, Duba (a ferry to Egypt is available at the port of Duba), Tabuk, and Jordan; and Jeddah, Mecca, Abha and Jizan in the south. A connection to Highway 60 near Yanbu connects Rabigh to Medina. Riyadh and the Qassim Province. Highway 40 is accessible through Jeddah, providing connections to Mecca, Riyadh and Dammam.

The nearest major airport to Rabigh is the King Abdulaziz International Airport in Jeddah, 148 km (92 mi) to the south. The Haramain high-speed railway stops at King Abdullah Economic City, providing high-speed rail connections to Jeddah, Mecca and Medina.

== Culture ==
=== Natural landmarks ===
The Red Sea hosts many coral reefs, and is thus the site of several marine sanctuaries, many of which are situated close to the coast. The Five Corals Reef is one such reef situated approximately 15 km (9 mi) south west of Rabigh.

=== Sports ===
The Al Entesar Club is a football club from Rabigh playing in the Saudi Second Division.

== See also ==
- Petro Rabigh
- King Abdullah Economic City
- King Abdullah University of Science and Technology
