= King Abdullah Economic City =

King Abdullah Economic City مدينة الملك عبد الله الاقتصادية
- City
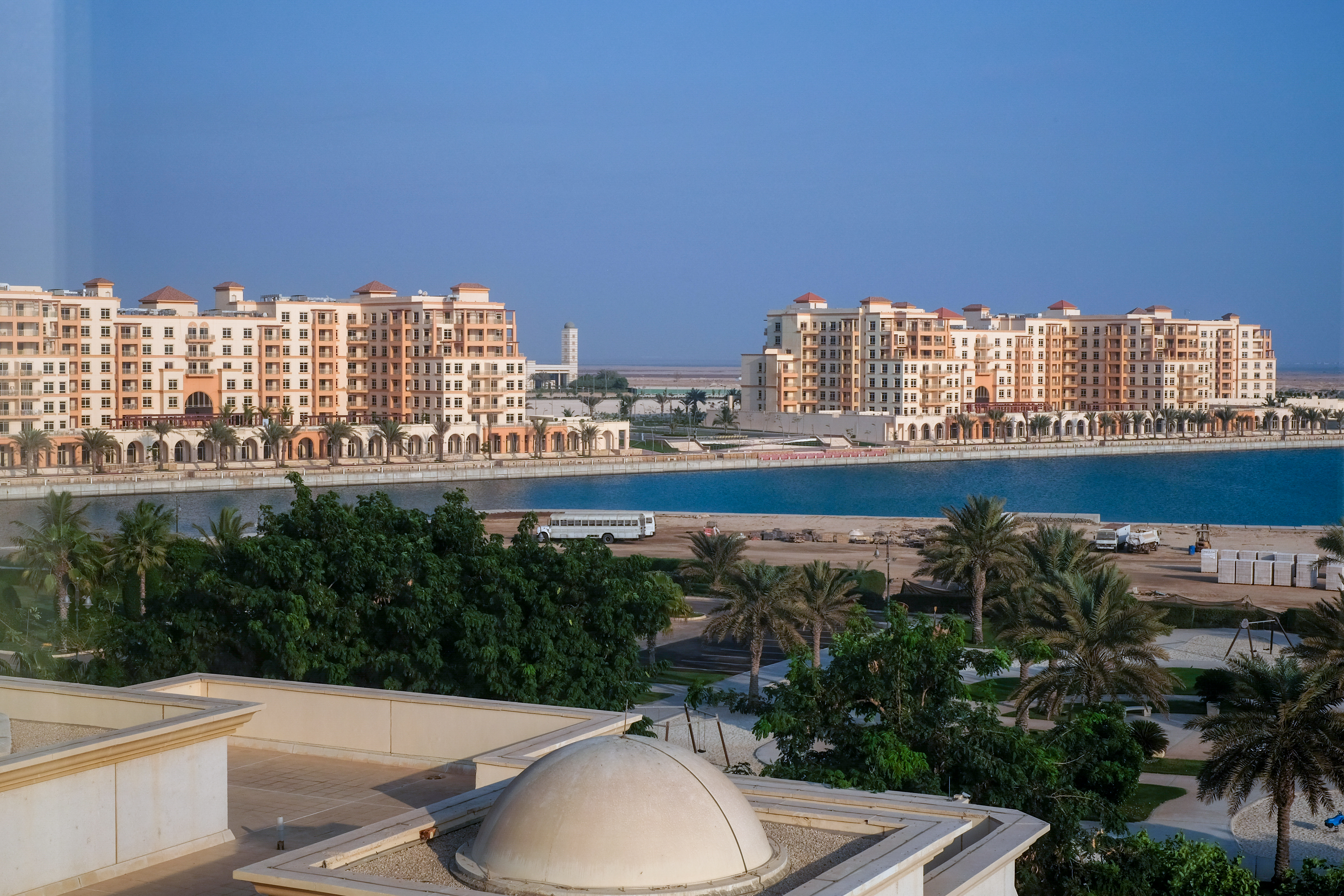
- Waterfront in 2016

- Location within Saudi Arabia
- Coordinates: 22°24′N 39°05′E
- Country: Saudi Arabia
- Province: Mecca
- Governorate: Rabigh
- Established: 2005; 21 years ago

Government

Area
  - Total: 173 km^{2} (67 sq mi)

Population
  - Total: 10,000
- Time zone: UTC+03:00 (SAST)
- Postal Code: King Abdullah Economic City 23965 – 7461 Kingdom of Saudi Arabia
- Area code: 012
- Website: www.kaec.net

King Abdullah Economic City (KAEC, /ˈkeɪk/; Arabic: مدينة الملك عبد الله الاقتصادية) is a planned city in Rabigh Governorate, Mecca Province, Saudi Arabia. It was announced as a megaproject in 2005 by King Abdullah bin Abdulaziz. It is located in close proximity to Thuwal, almost 100 km (62 mi) north of Jeddah.

It was one of six megaprojects that were announced in 2005 and is the only one that was launched. By 2018, The Financial Times wrote that the city had not attracted investment or become a hub for logistics and manufacturing, contrary to the grand plans behind the project. By 2018, the city had a population of 7,000.

== Overview ==
With a total development area of 173 km^{2} (66.8 sq mi), the city is located along the coast of the Red Sea, around 40 km south of Rabigh city and 100 km north of Jeddah, the commercial hub of Saudi Arabia. The city is also approximately an hour and 20 minutes away from the city of Mecca, 3 hours from Medina by car and an hour away from all Middle Eastern capital cities by plane. The total cost of the city is around SR 207 billion, with the project being built by Emaar Properties. A Tadawul-listed company created from Emaar Properties, a Dubai-based public joint stock company and one of the world's largest real estate companies, and SAGIA (Saudi Arabian General Investment Authority) which is the main facilitator of the project.

The city, along with another five economic cities, is a part of an ambitious "10x10" program to place Saudi Arabia among the world's top ten competitive investment destinations by the year 2010, planned by SAGIA. The first stage of the city was completed in 2010 and the whole city was planned to be fully completed by 2020. The city aims to diversify the nation's oil-based economy by bringing direct foreign and domestic investments. The city also aspires to help create up to one million jobs. Upon completion, KAEC is intended to have a population of 2 million. By 2018, it only had a population of 7,000. The Financial Times wrote that the city served as a warning for grand megaprojects in the region, as the project fell well short of the initial grand proposals behind the project. In 2026, the BBC noted that "the goal of it becoming a business and tourism hub hasn't materialised".

It is being built along with four other new cities in Saudi Arabia to control sprawl and congestion in existing cities.

The port of the city is part of the Maritime Silk Road that runs from the Chinese coast via the Suez Canal to the Mediterranean, there to the Upper Adriatic region of Trieste with its connections to Central and Eastern Europe.

== Developments ==
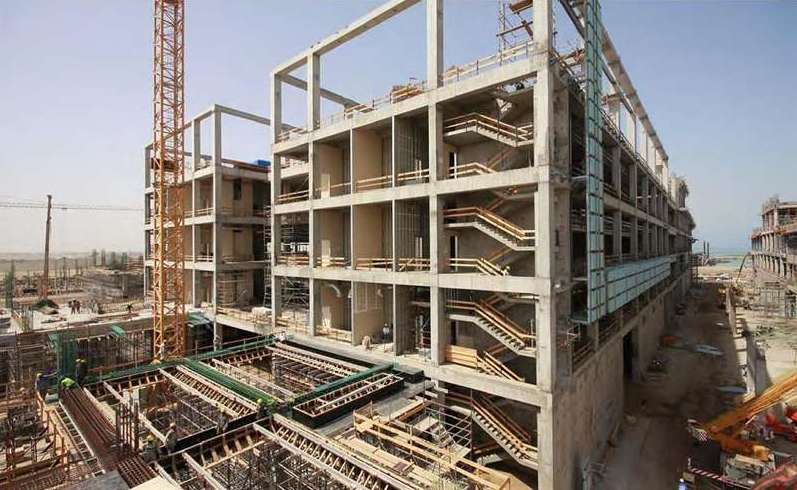
KAUST under construction

On 12 June 2008, King Abdullah visited the city and evaluated the progress. Some of the proposed projects in the city included:

- Science and Research Complex
- Columbia University
- Thunderbird University
- Environment Protection Centre
- Ethraa, The Smart City
- Health Care City
- KAEC Media City
- The Cadre Technical City
- EMAL International Aluminum Smelter factory
- Total Oil factory
- Holiday Inn Express Hotel
- Ritz-Carlton Hotel & Resort

The king also inaugurated the King Abdullah University of Science and Technology (KAUST). The university is 20 km away south of the city in the village of Thuwal. It opened in September 2009.

Emaar, E.C. and SAGIA have signed several memorandums of understanding and contracts with international and local developers in many fields.

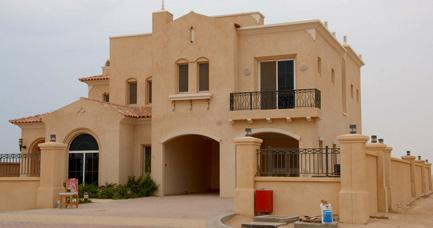
A house in Esmeralda

Emaar, E.C has also launched two residential areas, Bay La Sun Village, and Esmeralda Suburb.

=== Transport ===
KAEC is served by the Al-Haramain High Speed line. The construction of the station has been completed by 2018. On 25 September 2018, King Salman Bin Abdulaziz Al-Saud inaugurated the project.

Services at King Abdullah Economic City station
- Preceding station	Saudi Arabia Railways	Following station
  Medina Terminus	Haramain High Speed Railway	King Abdulaziz International Airport towards Mecca

== In fiction ==
The city is the destination of Alan Clay, the protagonist in Dave Eggers's 2012 novel A Hologram for the King.

== See also ==
- List of things named after Saudi kings
