= Duba, Saudi Arabia =

City and Governorate in Tabuk Province, Saudi Arabia

Duba Governorate محافظة ضباء
- City and Governorate
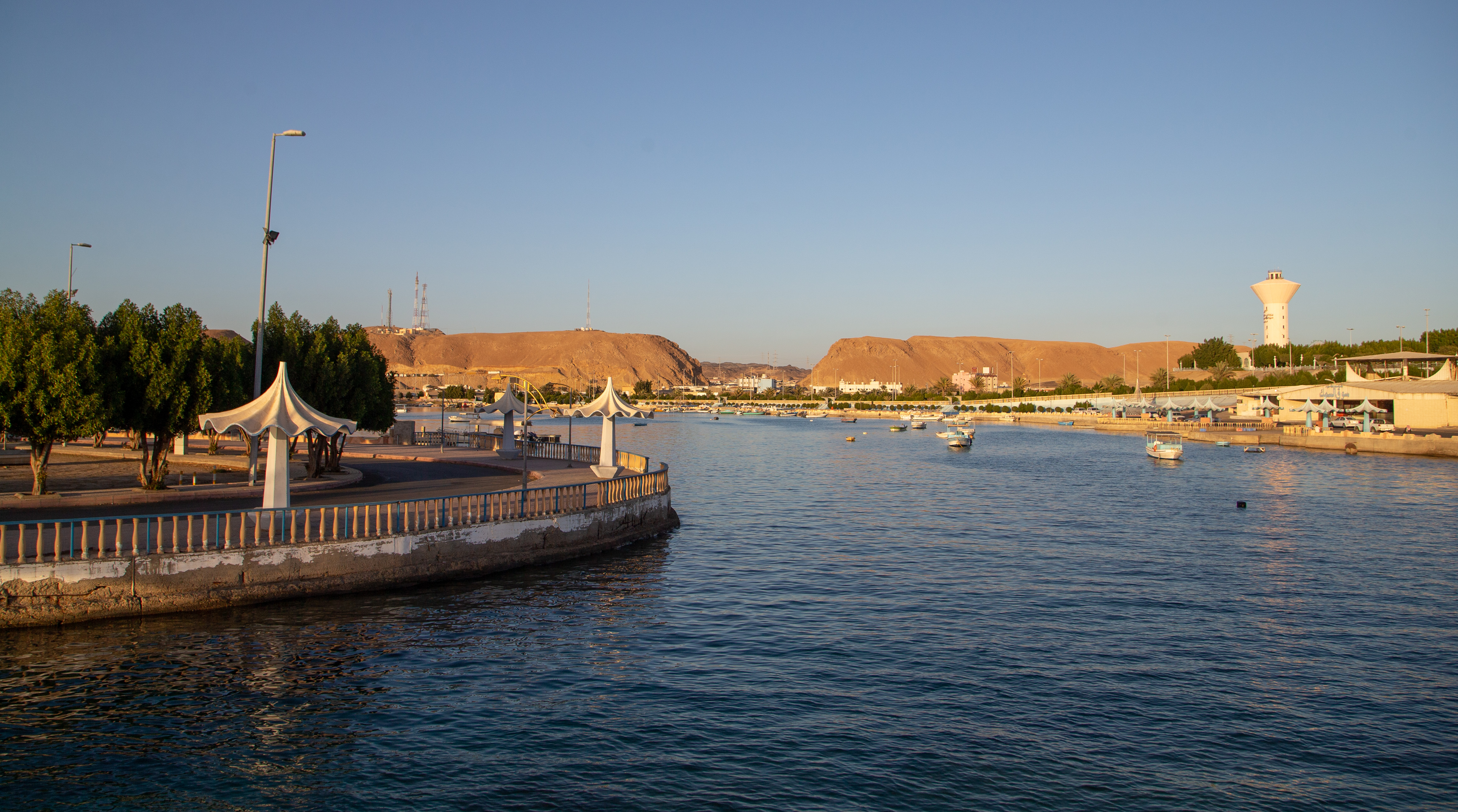
- Duba harbor

- Map Showing the Governorate’s Location within Tabuk Province

- Location of Duba within Saudi Arabia
- Coordinates: 27°20′57.3″N 35°41′46.2″E
- Country: Saudi Arabia
- Province: Tabuk Province
- Region: Hejaz
- Seat: Duba City

Government
  - Type: Municipality
  - Body: Duba Municipality

Area
  - City and Governorate: 11,680 km^{2} (4,510 sq mi)

Population (2022)
  - Metro: 54,917 (Duba governorate)
- Time zone: UTC+03:00 (SAST)
- Area code: 014

Duba (Arabic: ضباء) is a city and governorate located in the Tabuk Province of Saudi Arabia. Situated on the northern coast of the Red Sea.

== Geography ==
Duba is located in northwestern Saudi Arabia on the coast of the Red Sea, about 300 km from the junction of Egypt, Jordan and Israel. The city lies along the historic Egyptian Hajj route. Three valleys characterize the area: Wadi Dahkan to the north, and Wadi Salma and Wadi Kafafah to the south. It is approximately 800 km from Jeddah and Mecca via the coastal highway, which passes through major Red Sea cities including Yanbu.

Duba is a port city with regular ferry connections to Egypt and Jordan. Ferries to the Egyptian ports of Hurghada and Safaga typically take a minimum of about three hours. The city is situated near the southern entrance of the Gulf of Aqaba, which extends northward toward Eilat in Israel, and the city of Aqaba in Jordan.

Duba also serves as an access point for Neom, being located about 25 kilometres (16 mi) south of the planned site of the Neom Industrial City.

== Climate ==
Köppen climate classification classifies its climate as hot desert (BWh).

Climate data for Duba
Month	Jan	Feb	Mar	Apr	May	Jun	Jul	Aug	Sep	Oct	Nov	Dec	Year
Mean daily maximum °C (°F)	22.4 (72.3)	24 (75)	26.4 (79.5)	29.2 (84.6)	32.5 (90.5)	34.6 (94.3)	35.6 (96.1)	35.8 (96.4)	34 (93)	31.8 (89.2)	27.7 (81.9)	23.5 (74.3)	29.8 (85.6)
Daily mean °C (°F)	16.9 (62.4)	18.2 (64.8)	20.7 (69.3)	23.5 (74.3)	27.2 (81.0)	29.4 (84.9)	30.6 (87.1)	30.8 (87.4)	29 (84)	26.4 (79.5)	22.2 (72.0)	18 (64)	24.4 (75.9)
Mean daily minimum °C (°F)	11.4 (52.5)	12.5 (54.5)	15.1 (59.2)	17.9 (64.2)	21.9 (71.4)	24.3 (75.7)	25.6 (78.1)	25.8 (78.4)	24 (75)	21 (70)	16.8 (62.2)	12.6 (54.7)	19.1 (66.3)
Average precipitation mm (inches)	1 (0.0)	1 (0.0)	1 (0.0)	0 (0)	1 (0.0)	0 (0)	0 (0)	0 (0)	0 (0)	1 (0.0)	4 (0.2)	2 (0.1)	11 (0.3)
Source: Climate-Data.org (altitude: 15m)

== Transportation ==
=== Air ===
Duba does not have its own airport. Air travel for the governorate is primarily served by the Prince Sultan International Airport in Tabuk City, the province’s main airport. In addition, the Al-Wajh Domestic Airport in the neighboring governorate of Al-Wajh is also used by residents of Duba.

=== Buses ===
Duba is served by a SAPTCO station that provides intercity bus connections to the Tabuk Province and to other regions of Saudi Arabia, including the Mecca Province and the Riyadh Province. Major destinations served from Duba include the cities of Jeddah and Riyadh. Duba is planned to be served by a direct bus by RTA to Al Ghubaiba Bus Station.

== In Art and literature ==
Duba is the subject of a painting by Samuel Austin, an engraving of which was published in Fisher's Drawing Room Scrap Book, 1833 as Thubare, a Port on the Arabian Coast. along with a poetical illustration by Letitia Elizabeth Landon that recalls the story of the Fairy Pari-Banou and Prince Ahmed.

== See also ==
- Provinces of Saudi Arabia
- List of islands of Saudi Arabia
- List of governorates of Saudi Arabia
- List of cities and towns in Saudi Arabia
