= Saudi Public Transport Company =

Public transportation company of Saudi Arabia

Saudi Public Transport Company (SAPTCO)
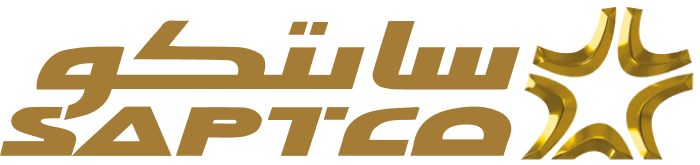
- Founded: July 9, 1979; 47 years ago
- Headquarters: Riyadh, Saudi Arabia
- Locale: Saudi Arabia
- Service area: Saudi Arabia and selected international destinations
- Service type: Urban bus transportation; Intercity transportation; International transportation; School transportation; Specialized transportation; Hajj and Umrah transportation
- Alliance: RATP Dev (through joint ventures)
- Website: saptco.com.sa/en

The Saudi Public Transport Company (SAPTCO; Arabic: الشركة السعودية للنقل الجماعي) is a Saudi joint-stock company engaged in passenger transportation. Established in 1979, it was created as part of the development of public transportation in Saudi Arabia. Its activities include urban and intercity bus services, international transportation and specialized transport services. The company is listed on the Saudi Exchange, and the Public Investment Fund is its largest shareholder.

== Overview ==
SAPTCO provides passenger transportation services within Saudi Arabia and participates in transportation projects through subsidiaries and partnerships. Its activities include urban and intercity bus services, international transportation, school transportation and specialized services for organizations and other customers. The company also provides transportation services associated with Hajj and Umrah.

In addition to its traditional bus operations, SAPTCO participates in urban public transportation projects through partnerships with international transport operators. These activities include the Riyadh Bus network and the operation and maintenance of selected Riyadh Metro lines. The company has also reported on digital mobility and the adoption of newer transportation technologies.

== History ==
=== Establishment and early development ===
SAPTCO was established in 1979 as a Saudi joint-stock company under Royal Decree No. M/11, dated 5 February 1979, with an initial capital of 1 billion Saudi riyals. The company's formation was subsequently announced through a resolution of the Minister of Commerce on 9 July 1979.

On 12 November 1979, Royal Decree No. M/48 granted SAPTCO a concession to provide passenger bus transportation on the Kingdom's public road network, both within and between cities. The concession was initially granted for 15 Hijri years and was subsequently renewed and extended. Saudipedia identifies a renewal issued on 12 October 2015.

=== Expansion and diversification ===
Over the following decades, SAPTCO developed its passenger transportation operations and expanded into urban transportation, international routes and specialized transport services. Its activities also came to include transportation associated with pilgrimage, educational institutions and business customers.

In 2007, the company's capital increased from 1 billion to 1.25 billion Saudi riyals. SAPTCO subsequently expanded its activities through subsidiaries and partnerships in different areas of passenger transportation.

=== Strategic partnerships ===
In 2010, SAPTCO established a partnership with RATP Dev. The partnership led to the establishment of the Public Transport Company, in which SAPTCO holds an 80% interest and RATP Dev holds 20%. The company was established to participate in the development and operation of the Riyadh public bus network.

A second joint venture, Capital Metro Company (CAMCO), was established with SAPTCO holding a 20% interest and RATP Dev holding 80%. CAMCO was established to operate and maintain two lines of the Riyadh Metro system.

In 2014, SAPTCO established the Saudi Emirates Integrated Transport Company (SEITCO) in partnership with Emirates Transport. The company was established to provide school transportation services in Saudi Arabia.

=== Development of urban transportation ===
SAPTCO expanded its participation in urban transportation through the Riyadh Bus network and the Riyadh Metro project. These projects formed part of the development of integrated public transportation in the Saudi capital.

In the 2020s, SAPTCO continued to develop its transportation activities, including urban mobility, specialized services and digital transportation solutions. Its corporate reporting also discusses operational development and newer transportation technologies.

== Major projects ==
=== Riyadh Bus ===
SAPTCO participates in the Riyadh Bus project through the Public Transport Company, its joint venture with RATP Dev. The network forms part of Riyadh's public transportation system, developed under the supervision of the Royal Commission for Riyadh City. It provides bus services connecting different parts of the capital and forms part of the city's wider public transportation network.

=== Riyadh Metro ===
SAPTCO participates in the Riyadh Metro project through Capital Metro Company (CAMCO), its joint venture with RATP Dev. CAMCO was established to operate and maintain two of the six Riyadh Metro lines: the Blue Line and the Red Line. SAPTCO holds a 20% interest in CAMCO, while RATP Dev holds the remaining 80%.

=== Intercity and international transportation ===
Intercity passenger transportation has been a central part of SAPTCO's activities since its establishment. The company developed services connecting cities and population centres across Saudi Arabia. It has also provided international bus transportation connecting the Kingdom with neighbouring countries and other regional destinations. Routes and services may change over time.

=== School and specialized transportation ===
SAPTCO participates in school transportation through SEITCO, established in partnership with Emirates Transport in 2014. Its wider specialized transportation activities include services for organizations, employees, educational institutions and customers requiring transportation for specific purposes. The company also provides transportation services associated with Hajj and Umrah.

=== Digital and sustainable mobility ===
SAPTCO's corporate reporting identifies digitalization, smart transportation solutions and operational development as areas of focus. The company has also participated in the introduction of electric buses in Saudi Arabia. These initiatives form part of the wider development of public transportation and mobility services in the Kingdom.
