= Al Darb =

Al Darb محافظة الدرب
- Governorate
- Al Darb
- Location in Saudi Arabia
- Coordinates: 17°43′0″N 42°15′0″E
- Country: Saudi Arabia
- Region: Jizan Region
- Seat: Al Darb

Population (2016)
  - Total: 69,134
- Time zone: UTC+3 (EAT)
  - Summer (DST): UTC+3 (EAT)

Al Darb (Arabic: الدرب) is one of the governorates in Jizan Region, Saudi Arabia.
