= Nabil Al-Amoudi =

Saudi Arabian politician

Nabil bin Mohammed Al-Amoudi is the CEO of Olayan Financing Co., a subsidiary of The Olayan Group.

Al-Amoudi was Saudi Arabia's transport minister from October 2017 to 23 October 2019.

Al-Amoudi holds a bachelor's degree in chemical engineering from Stanford University in the United States in 1995. In 2001 Al-Amoudi awarded a doctorate in law from Harvard Law School in the United States.

He was the chairman of the General Authority of Ports, Aramco Services Company in Houston, Texas, and Aramco Refining Company. He was senior consultant at Saudi Aramco.
