= List of tourist attractions in Riyadh =

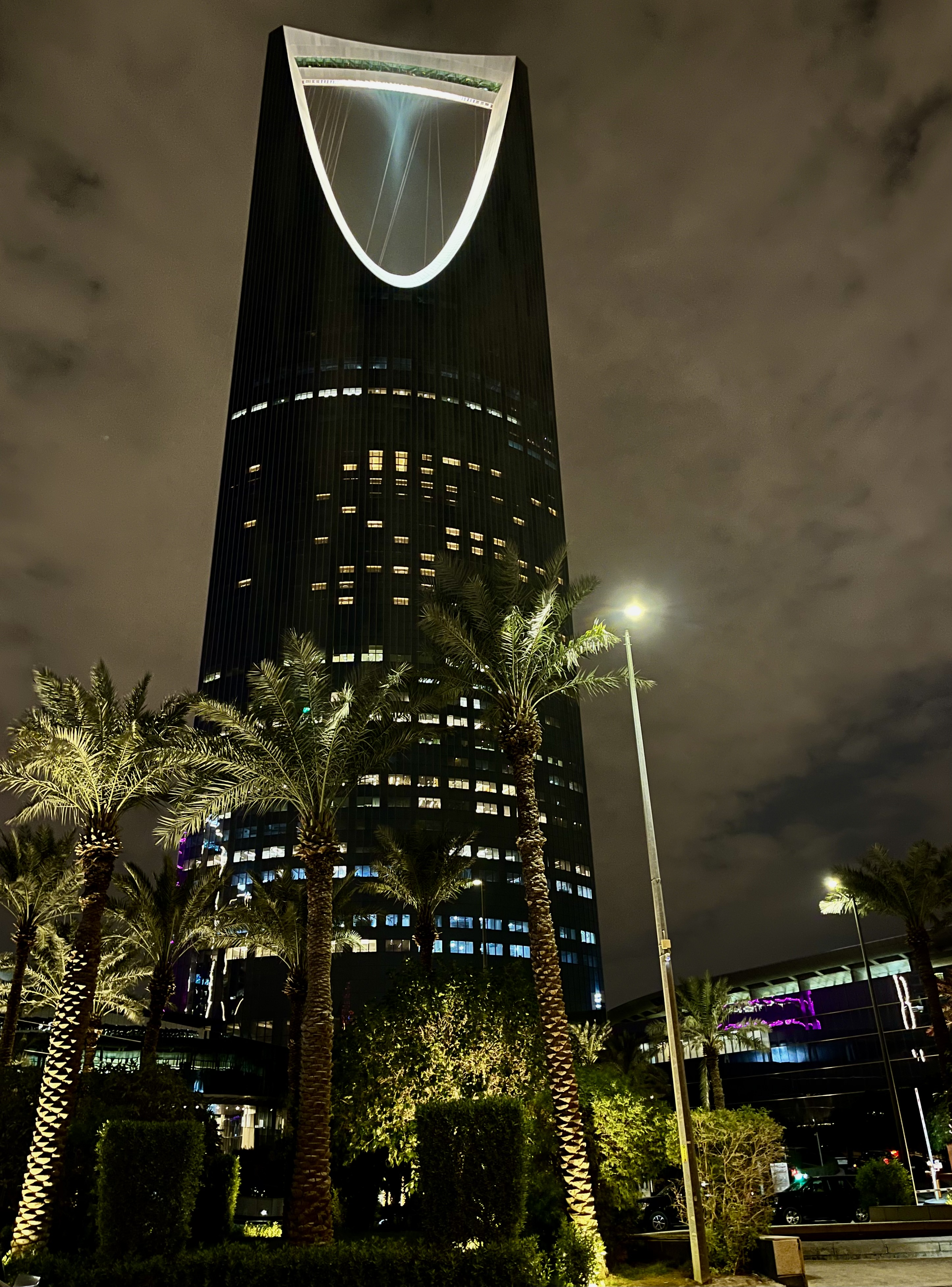
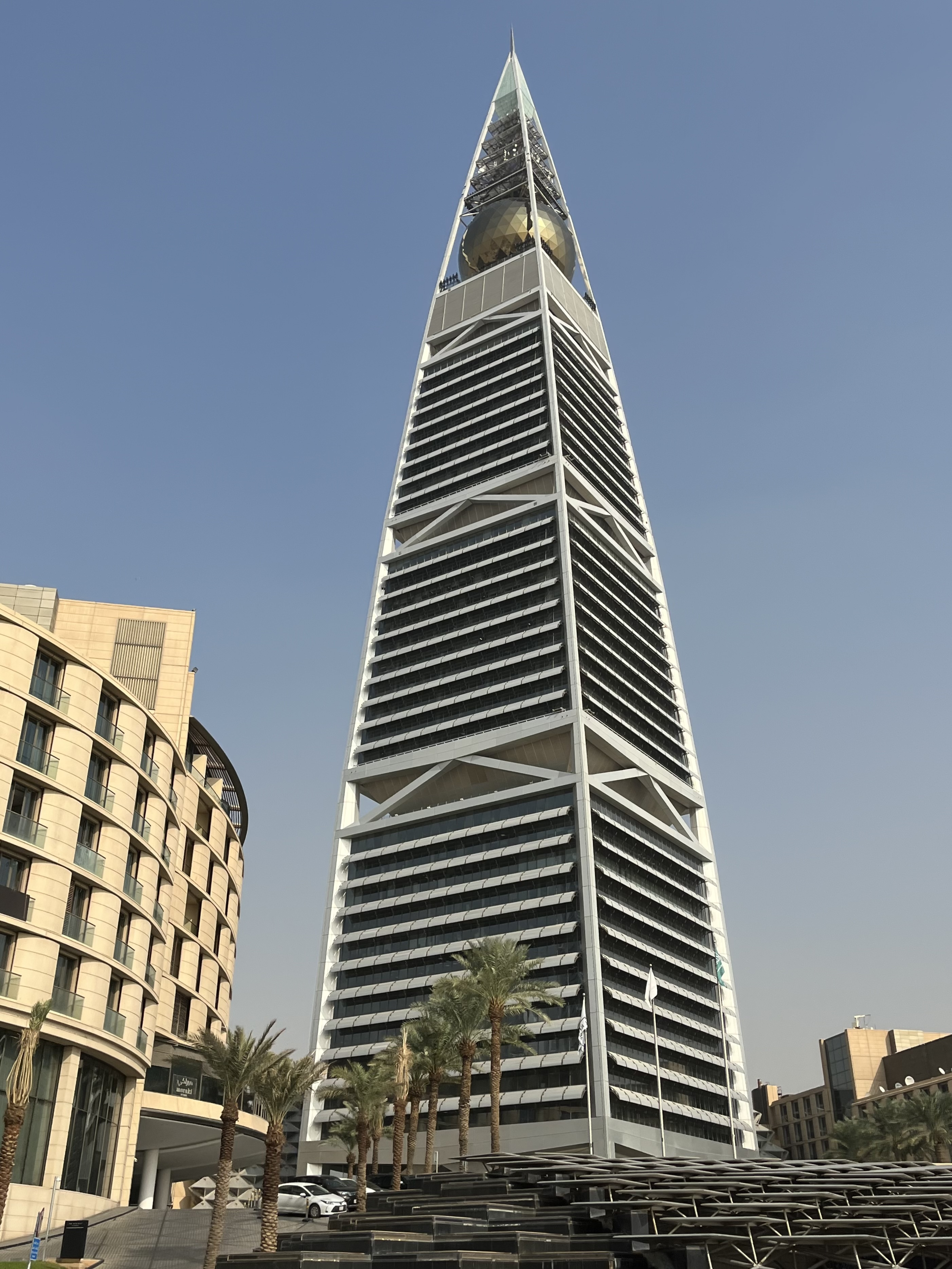
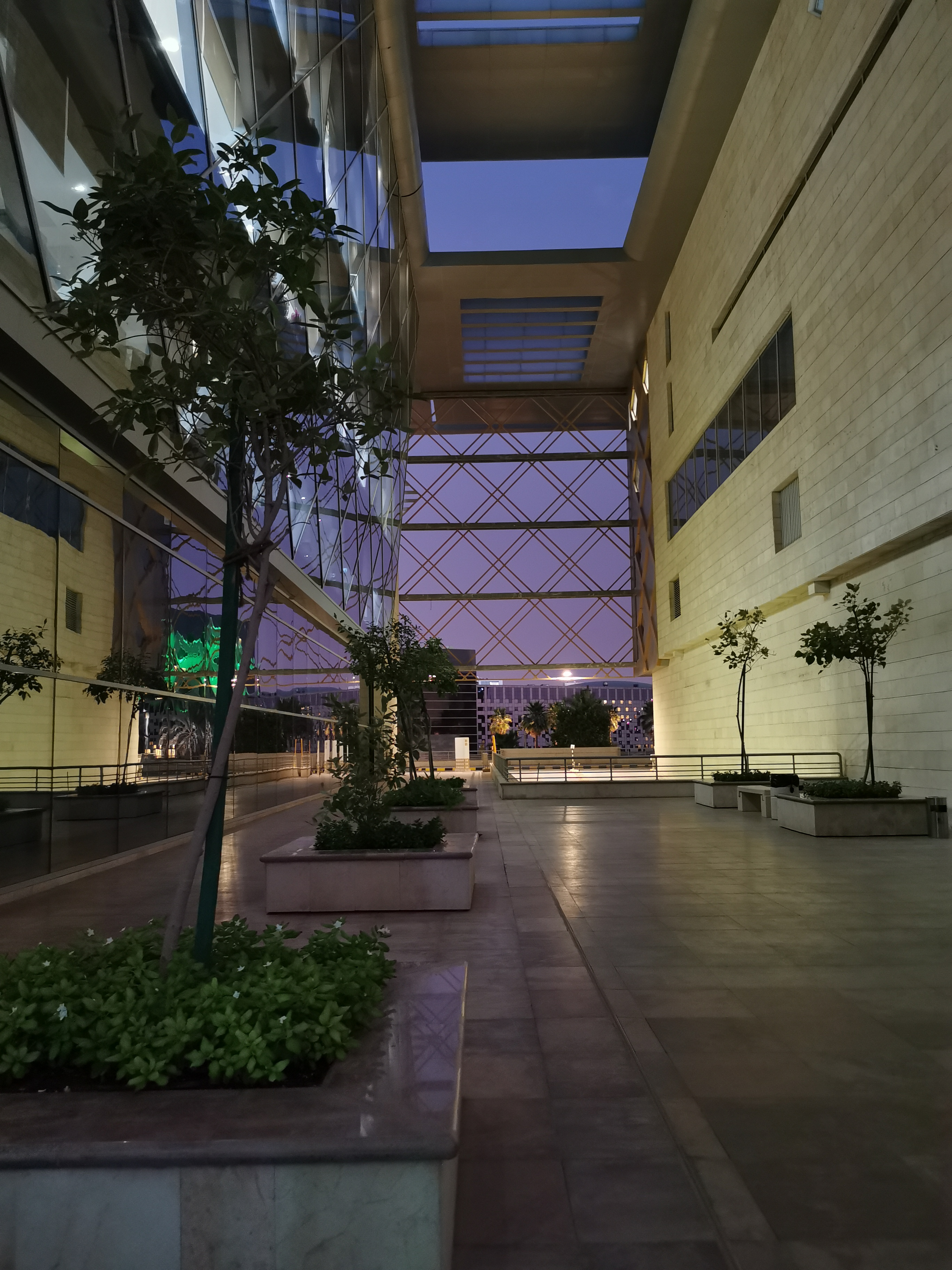
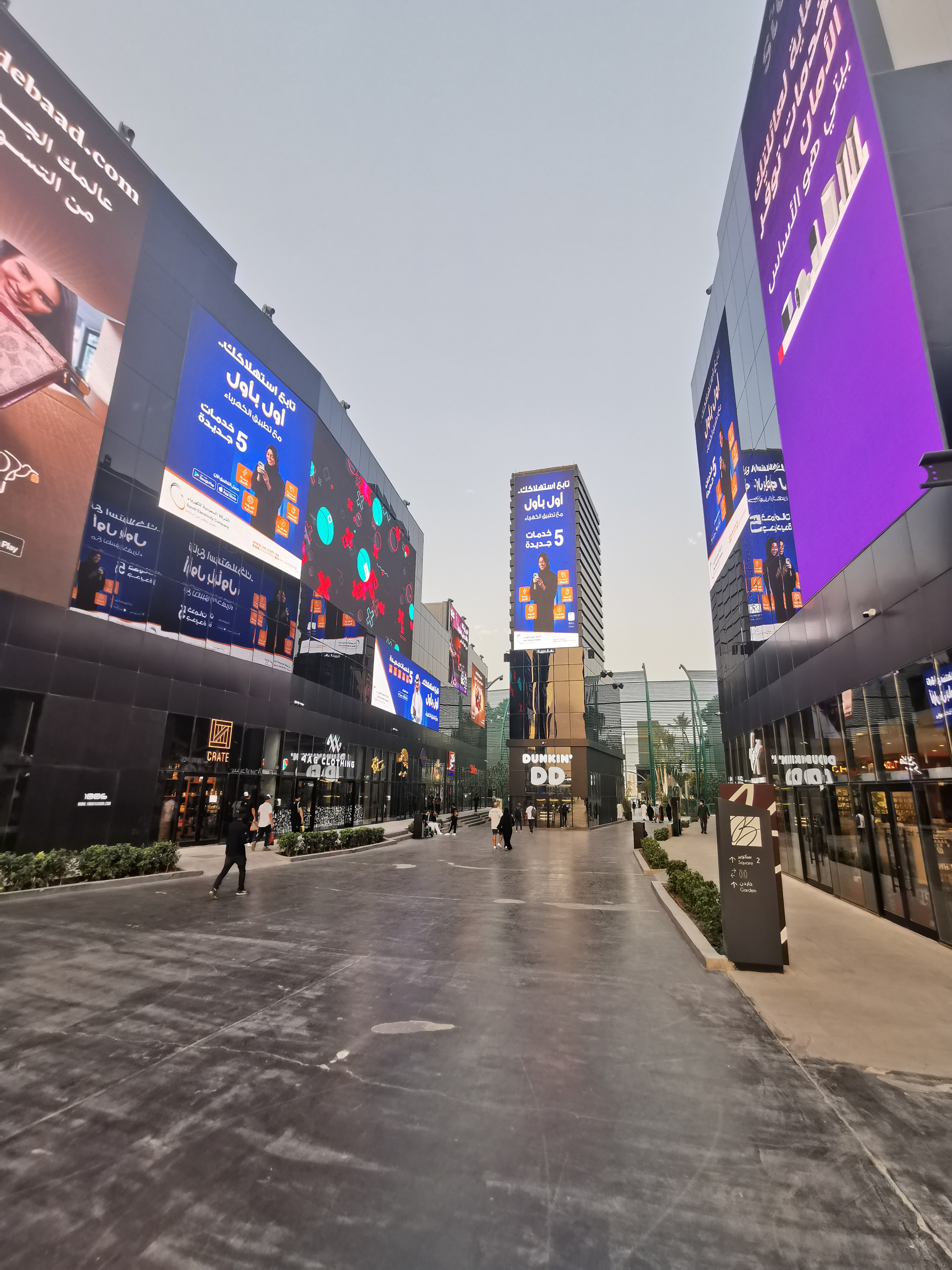
Kingdom Centre, Al Faisaliah Tower, King Abdulaziz Historical Center, Boulevard City

Riyadh is the capital and largest city of Saudi Arabia. The city has many tourist attractions and received around 19.1 million tourists in 2023. It is the second-most visited city in the country, after Mecca. Before the introduction of tourist visas in 2019, the city received around 5 million tourists each year, making it the forty-ninth most visited city in the world and the 6th in the Middle East. The numbers almost doubled in 2021, with 10.44 million tourists visiting Riyadh in 2021.

The Kingdom Centre and Al Faisaliah Tower are among the world's most recognizable symbols of Riyadh. Prominent festivals of city that attract visitors include Jenadriyah, Riyadh Season, Riyadh International Book Fair and Noor Riyadh.

== Skyline and sightseeing ==
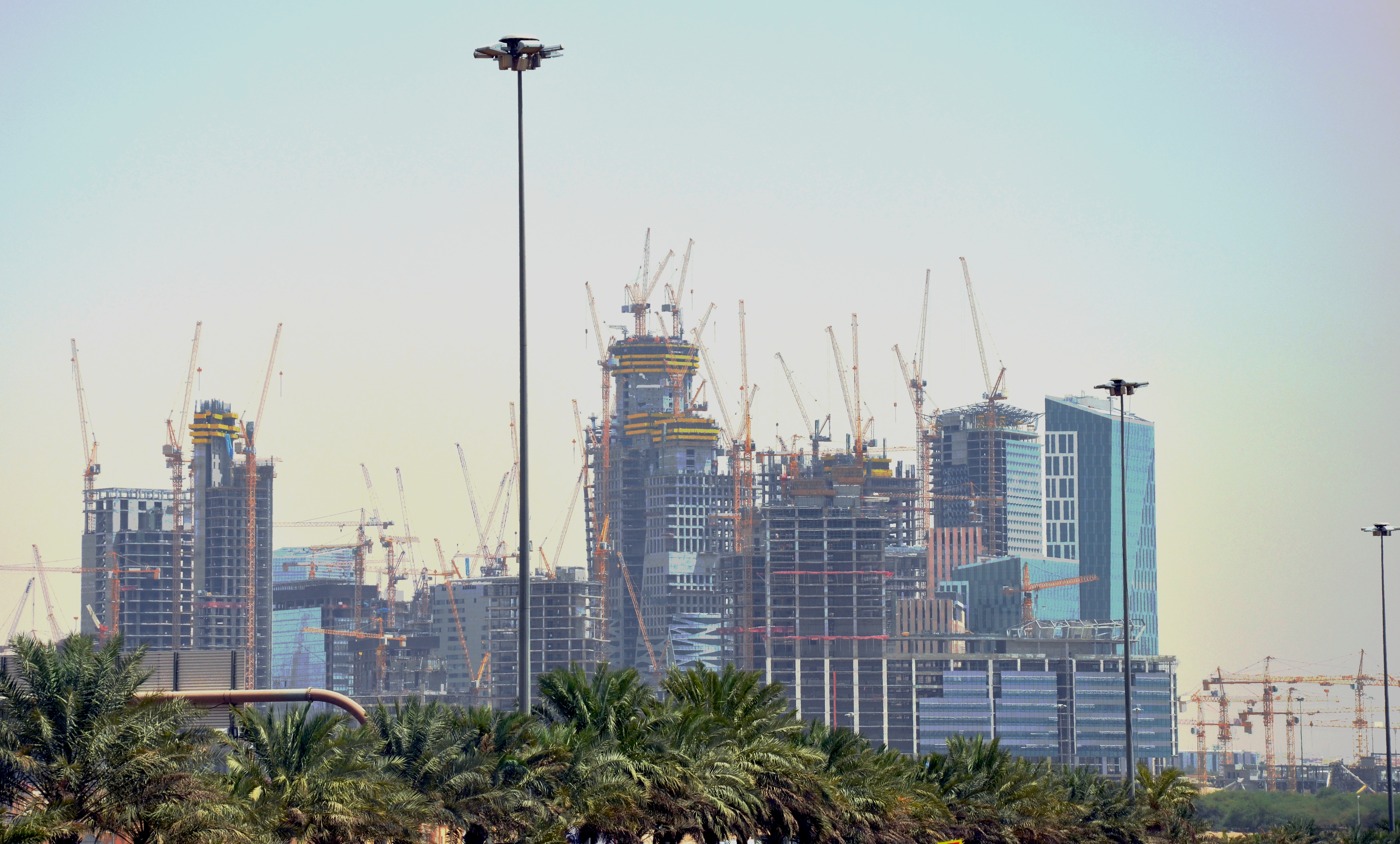
King Abdullah Financial District

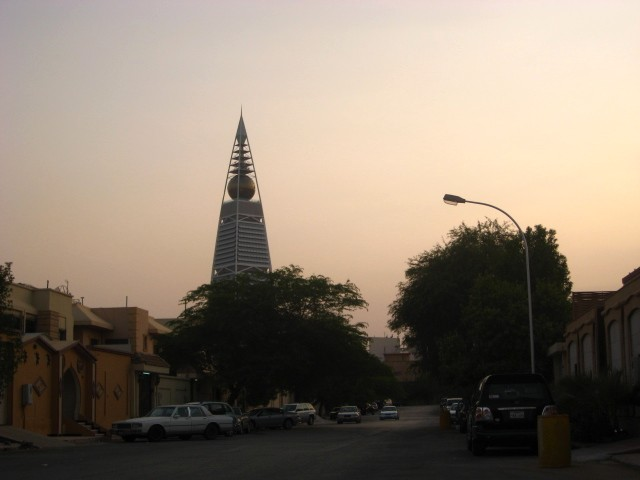
Al Faisaliah Tower

- Kingdom Centre, also known as Kingdom Tower, is a tall skyscraper located in Olaya district. One of the globally recognized iconic landmarks on Riyadh, the building is recognized for its inverted parabolic arch. It consists of Four Seasons Hotel and the King Abdullah Mosque, which is the world's most elevated mosque from ground level. The tower was built in 2002 by Prince Waleed bin Talal and designed by Ellerbe Becket and Omrania.
- Al Faisaliah Tower is a pyramid-shaped skyscraper and mixed-used complex located in Olaya. At a height of 267 metres (876 ft), the tower consists of 30 floors. Named after late King Faisal bin Abdul Aziz, it was completed on 14 May 2000 and became the first skyscraper in Saudi Arabia. The tower is usually known for its ball shaped structure at the top, consisting of a hotel and restaurant. A shopping center located at the first three floor of the tower have outlets of notable brands, such as Gucci, H&M and Adidas.
- Public Investment Fund Tower
- KAFD World Trade Center
- Al Majdoul Tower
- Olaya Towers
- Boudl Tower
- Al Nakheel Tower
- Al Rajhi Bank Tower
- Burj Al Anoud
- Burj Rafal
- Villas in the Sky
- Hamad Tower
- Riyadh Water Tower
- Riyadh TV Tower
- Khaldia Towers
- Riyad Bank Tower
- Etlal Tower
- Crowne Plaza Riyadh Palace
- KAFD metro station
- Ministry of Interior building
- Royal Secondary Industrial Institute
- Sohaibani and Partners Law Firm Head Office

== Shopping centers and mixed-use developments ==
- Boulevard City
- Boulevard World
- Digital City
- King Abdullah Financial District
- VIA Riyadh
- Roshn Front
- U Walk
- Laysen Valley
- Riyadh Gallery Mall
- Riyadh Park
- The View Mall
- Tala Mall
- Sahara Mall
- Granada Center
- Centria Mall
- Nakheel Mall
- Souq Taibah
- Shola Mall
- Al Kindi Plaza
- Souq al-Zal
- Swaigah Trade Center
- Al Maigliah Market Center
- Al Deira Market
- Souq al-Thumairi
- Souq al-Awaleen
- Souq Haraj Ibn Qasim
- Souq al-Hilla

== Urban green spaces and landscapes ==
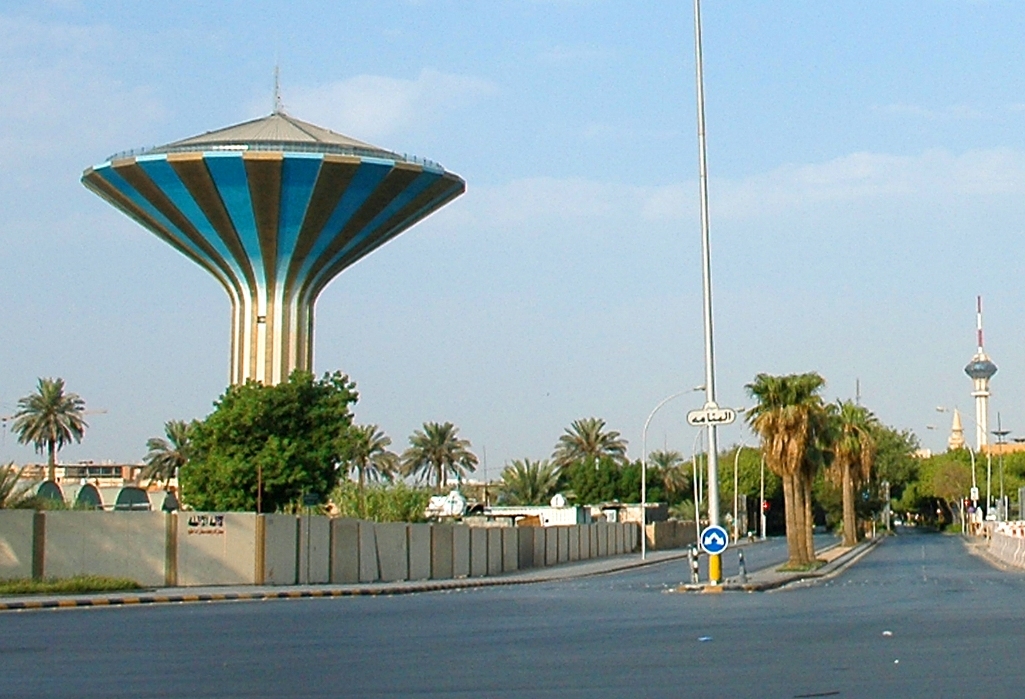

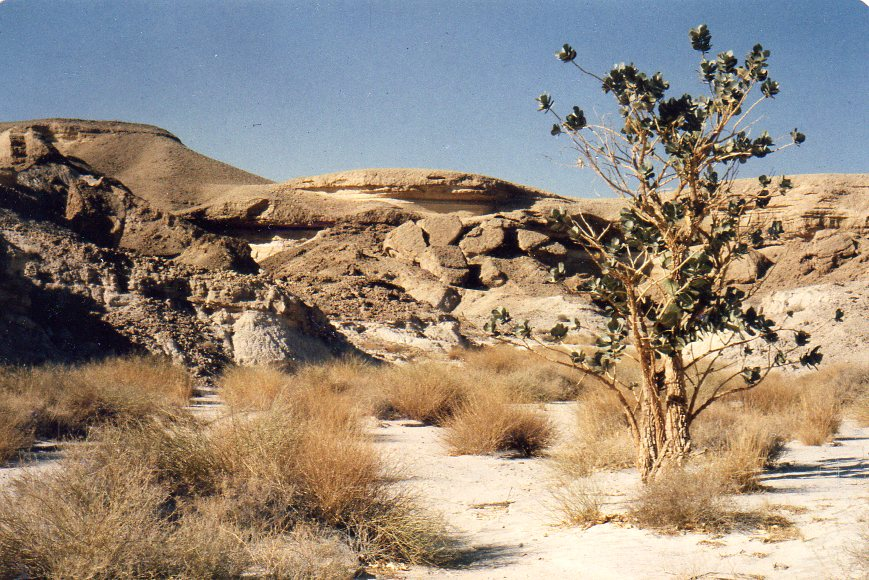

- Riyadh Zoo
- King Abdullah Park
- Salam Park
- National Museum Park
- Al-Watan Park
- Wahat al-Nakheel
- Al-Suwaidi Park
- Al Fouta Garden
- Thumamah Wildlife Park
- King Abdulaziz Manakh Park
- Jabal Abu Makhruq
- Al Khalidiyah Park
- Wadi Hanifah Park
- Wadi Laban Park
- Wadi Namar Park
- Ha'ir Lakes Park
- Ein Heet Cave
- Jabal Tuwaiq
- King Salman Park, Banban

== Forts, monuments and other heritage landmarks ==
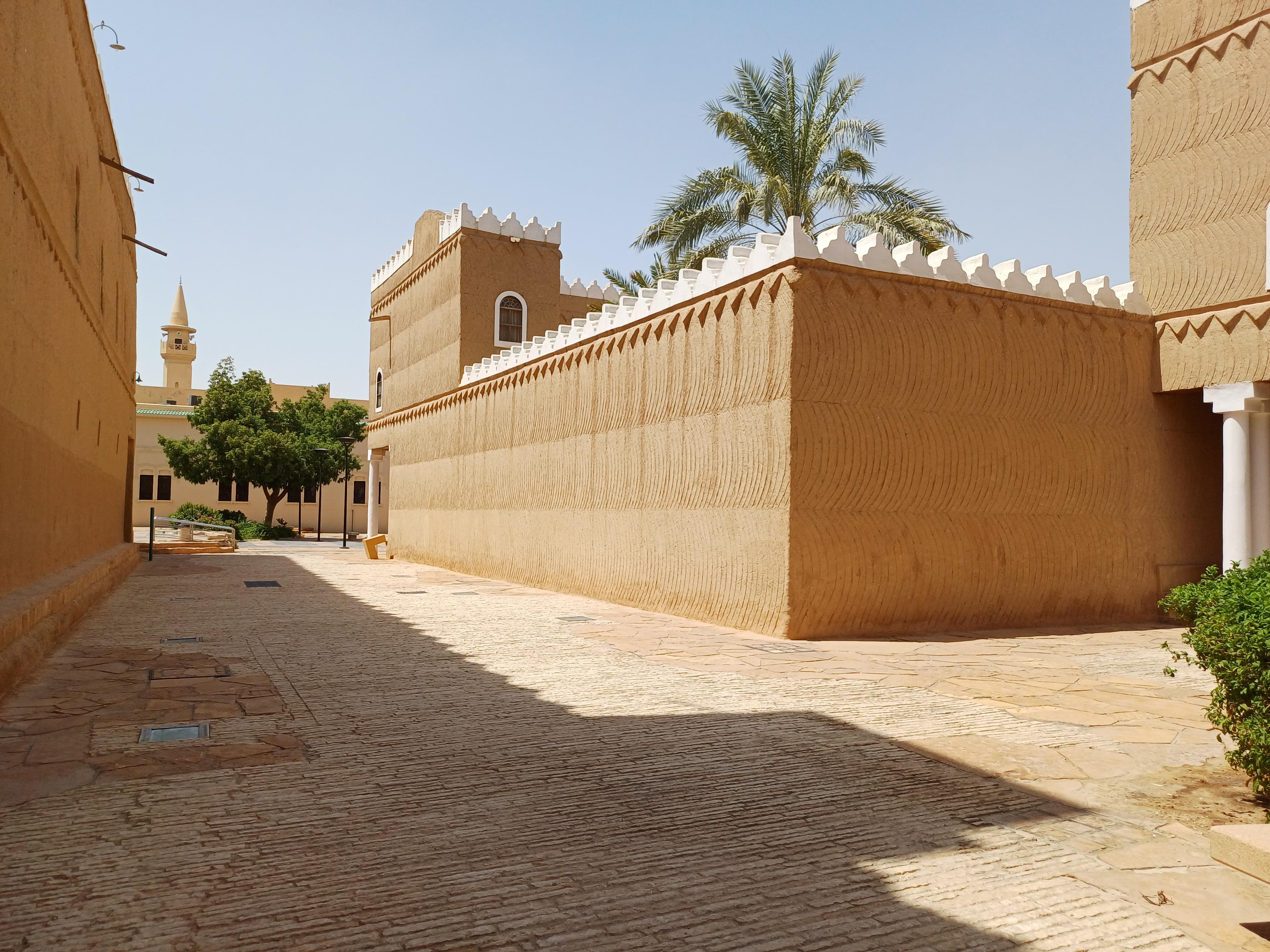

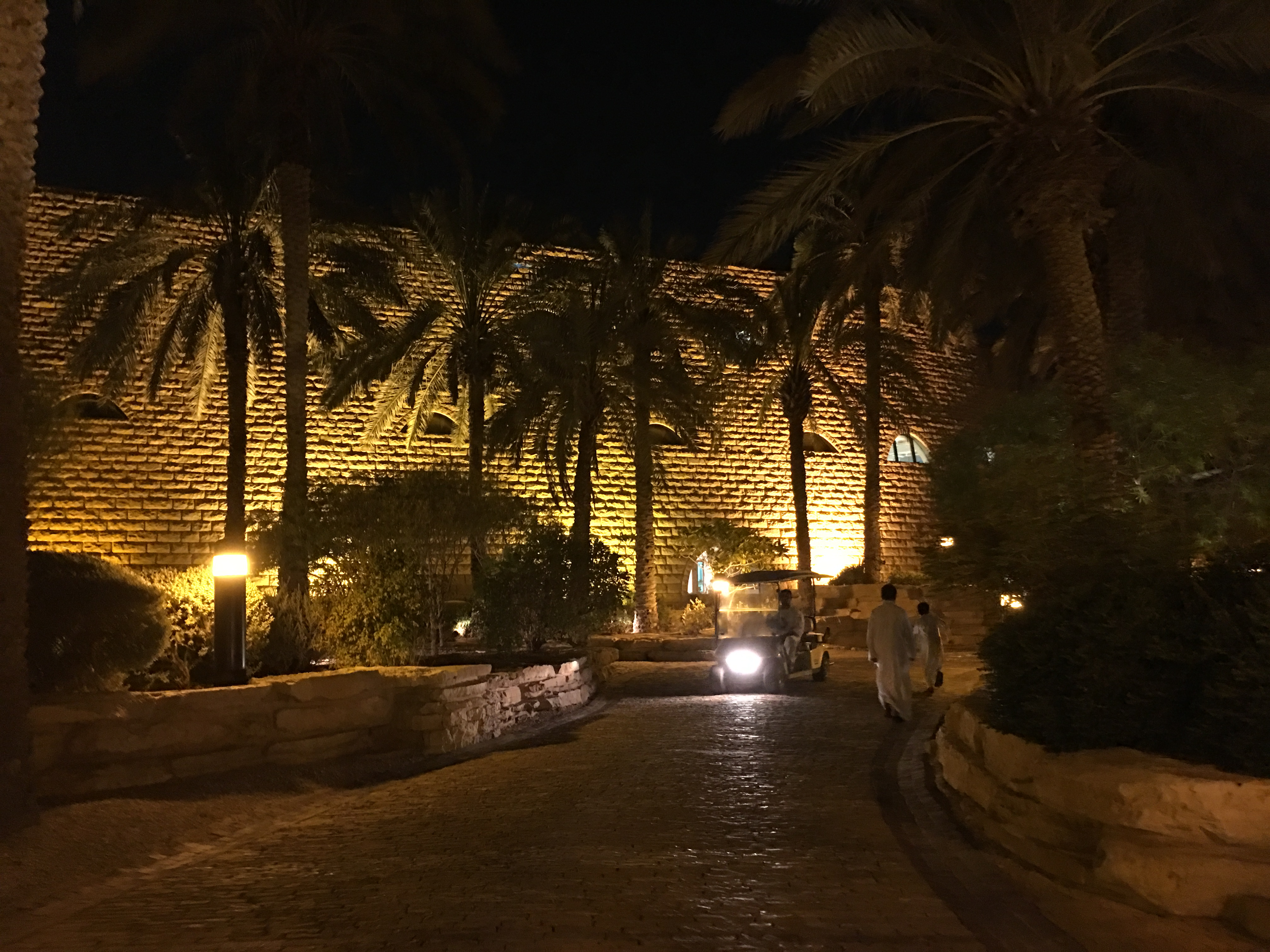

- King Abdulaziz Historical Center
- Masmak Palace
- Murabba Palace
- Thumairi Gate
- Dakhnah Gate
- Al Abtal Gate
- Nasiriyah Gate
- Safat Clocktower
- Red Palace
- Thulaim Palace
- Ma'dhar Palace
- Shamsiyya Palace
- Badi'a Palace
- Irqah Hospital
- Tuwaiq Palace
- Oud cemetery

== Mosques ==
- Imam Turki bin Abdullah Grand Mosque
- Al Rajhi Grand Mosque
- King Khalid Grand Mosque
- Hayy Assafarat Grand Mosque
- KAFD Grand Mosque
- King Abdullah Mosque
- Sheikh Muhammad bin Ibrahim Mosque
- Al-Qibli Mosque
- Hilla Mosque
- Sohoom Mosque
- King Khalid Airport Mosque
- Princess Latifa bint Sultan Mosque
- Salam Mosque
- King Abdulaziz Mosque
- Al Madi Mosque
- King Fahd Mosque
- Al Dakheel Mosque

== Museums, libraries and science parks ==
- National Museum of Saudi Arabia
- King Fahad National Library
- Royal Saudi Air Force Museum
- King Abdulaziz Public Library
- SAMA Money Museum
- Al-Faisal Museum for Arab-Islamic Art
- Archaeological Museum at King Saud University
- Al Hamdan Heritage Museum
- Naila Art Gallery
- King Salman Science Oasis
- Riyadh Techno Valley
- WWE Experience

== Stadiums and sports venues ==
- Kingdom Arena
- Mohammed Abdo Arena
- Prince Faisal bin Fahd Sports City
- King Fahd Sports City
- King Saud University Stadium
- Al-Shabab Club Stadium
- GPYW Indoor Stadium
- Prince Turki bin Abdul Aziz Stadium
- King Abdulaziz Racetrack
- Al Areen Equestrian Club
