= Aramco Stadium =

Stadium in Khobar, Saudi Arabia

- ملعب أرامكو
- Interactive map of Aramco Stadium
- Address: Al Khobar; Saudi Arabia
- Location: Khobar, Eastern Province, Saudi Arabia
- Coordinates: 26.365°N 50.181°E
- Owner: ROSHN Group
- Operator: Saudi Aramco
- Capacity: 47,000
- Surface: Hybrid grass
- Scoreboard: Yes
- Field size: Field of play: 105m × 68m Pitch area: 125m × 85m
- Parking: 9000

Construction
- Groundbreaking: July 31, 2024; 2 years ago
- Opened: December 27, 2026 (1 month time)
- Cost: SAR3.7 billion (US$1 billion)
- Architect: Populous
- Main contractors: BESIX and AlBawani

Tenants
- Al-Qadsiah FC (planned); Al-Qadsiah FC (women) (planned): Major sporting events hosted; 2027 AFC Asian Cup (planned) 2034 FIFA World Cup (planned)

Website
- aramcostadium.com

Aramco Stadium, (Note: Arabic: ملعب أرامكو (romanized: Malʿab Ārāmkū), also known as Saudi Aramco Stadium) is an under-construction multi-purpose stadium located in the north of Khobar, Saudi Arabia. The stadium will be owned by the ROSHN Group and operated by Saudi Aramco, serving as the home stadium for Al-Qadsiah FC. The stadium will have a capacity of 47,000 people and is scheduled to host matches for the 2027 AFC Asian Cup and the 2034 FIFA World Cup.

== History ==
The stadium was built to serve as the home ground for Al-Qadsiah FC and to host matches for the 2027 AFC Asian Cup and the 2034 FIFA World Cup. Saudi Aramco announced plans to build the 47,000-seat Aramco Stadium in Khobar on 31 July 2024. Developed as an asset owned by the ROSHN Group for SAR 3.7 billion, the venue was designed by architectural firm Populous based on Arabian Gulf whirlpools and sails. Groundbreaking began in early 2024 with a completion target of late 2026. The 800,000-square-meter site features an integrated climate control system.

Two safety incidents occurred during construction: a fatal accident involving a Pakistani laborer on 12 March 2025, and a minor localized fire on 16 January 2026 that emergency services contained within ten minutes. Upon opening, Al-Qadsiah FC will relocate to the venue, replacing their previous tenancy at the Prince Mohamed bin Fahd Stadium.

On 10/11/2026, Al-Qadsiah's women team had their first training session in the stadium. On 18/11/2026 Al-Qadsiah's men team played a test match friendly against Al-Riffa, which ended in a 4-2 victory for Al-Qadsiah.

== Design ==
The planned design resembles a whirlpool inspired by the natural water spirals found along the coast of Khobar. The interior bowl has a seating capacity of 47,000 and features integrated cooling systems and built-in air conditioning to regulate temperatures for both players and spectators.

== Management ==
The stadium is owned by the ROSHN Group and operated by Saudi Aramco under a 25-year concession agreement. On 13 April 2026, Saudi Aramco established a wholly owned subsidiary, the Aramco Stadium Company, to handle the venue's commercial operations and facility management. Matthew Kittle was appointed as the company's chief executive officer.

== See also ==
- List of football stadiums in Saudi Arabia
