= 1964 Saudi Arabian coup d'état =

Successful bloodless coup d'état

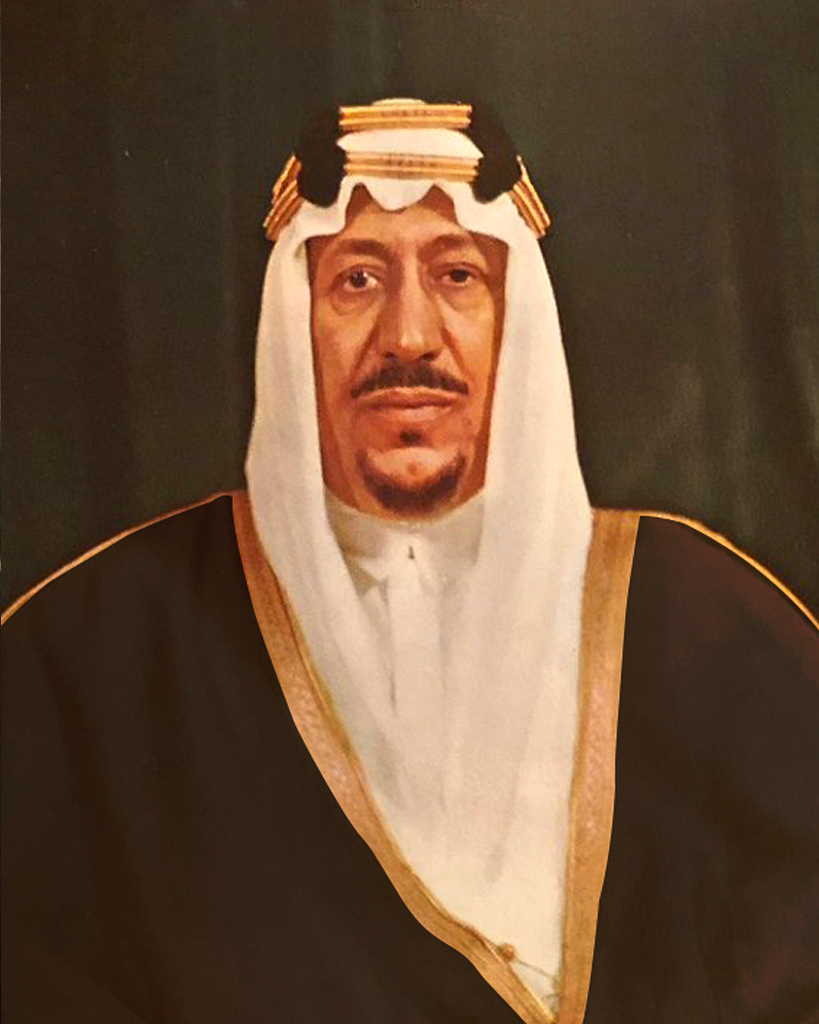
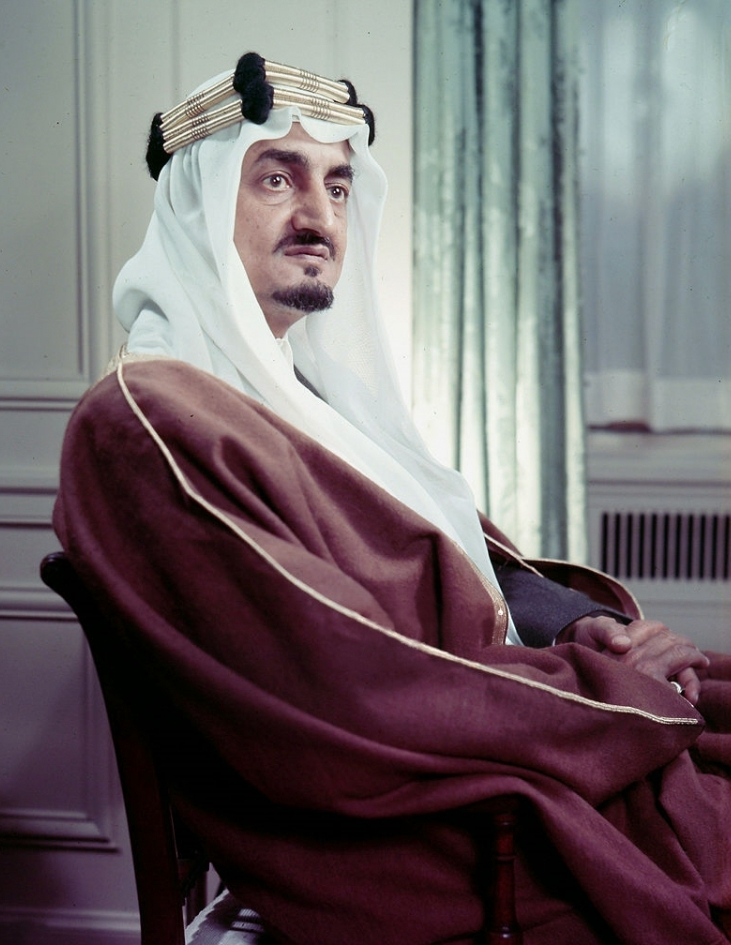
- Saud Faisal
- Date: February – November 1964
- Location: Riyadh, Saudi Arabia
- Type: Palace coup
- Cause: Dispute between King Saud and Crown Prince Faisal over rule
- Participants: House of Saud, ulema, National Guard, Royal Guard
- Outcome: King Saud deposed; Faisal proclaimed king

The 1964 Saudi Arabian coup d'état was a bloodless palace coup in the Kingdom of Saudi Arabia in which King Saud was deposed by his half-brother, Crown Prince Faisal, with the backing of the senior princes of the House of Saud and the kingdom's senior religious scholars, the ulema. The removal took place in stages: in February and March 1964 Faisal seized effective control of the government, leaving Saud with only the royal title, and in early November 1964 the royal family and religious leaders formally resolved to depose Saud and proclaim Faisal king. Saud left Saudi Arabia shortly afterward. The deposition followed a long-running struggle between the two brothers over Saud's mismanagement of the kingdom's finances and Faisal's program of cautious reform and modernization.

== Background ==
King Saud had ruled Saudi Arabia since the death of his father, King Abdulaziz, in 1953. By the late 1950s his government was in serious financial difficulty. The New York Times reported that Saud's overspending at home and abroad had pushed the kingdom deeply into debt and nearly ruined the Saudi economy; the Saudi riyal was falling in value and inflation was accelerating when Faisal took charge in 1958. Saud also embarrassed the royal family by becoming involved in a failed plot to assassinate President Gamal Abdel Nasser of the United Arab Republic.

In 1958 the royal family first called on Faisal to take charge of the government and restore order. Except for periods in 1960-62 when Saud briefly reasserted his authority, Faisal thereafter acted as effective ruler. Faisal cut the allowances of the royal family, stabilized the kingdom's finances, and began a program of economic development, including road-building, electrification, and plans for steel and petrochemical industries.

Faisal was initially reluctant to displace his brother because of an oath he had made to King Abdulaziz, who before his death obliged his sons to swear that they would accept Saud as king. Abdulaziz's idea was that Saud should reign while concerning himself mainly with internal affairs, while Faisal should deal with foreign policy; this division of labor broke down in 1958. Faisal also declined to take the title of king on the grounds that it would set a bad precedent, placing Saudi Arabia on the same level as countries that had experienced coups d'état.

== February and March 1964 confrontation ==
In mid-February 1964 Faisal forced Saud to surrender all royal powers while retaining the title of king. The confrontation escalated the following month. According to reports, the crisis began with a meeting of all leading members of the royal family except Saud, along with 34 religious patriarchs and tribal leaders, after Saud demanded that his powers be restored in full. The gathering upheld Faisal and proposed removing Saud from the throne, but Faisal insisted that Saud keep the title, saying that what mattered was that the King should leave power in Faisal's hands and not interfere in public life.

The assembly included Prince Mohammed Ibn Abdul Aziz, third eldest son of King Abdulaziz and known for his toughness; Abdel Aziz Ibn Musaed, Governor of Asir and the oldest living member of the royal family; and Saud Bin Jiluwi, governor of the Eastern Province. The ulema were headed by the Grand Mufti of Riyadh, Sheikh Mohammed Ibn Ibrahim, and also included his brother Sheikh Abdul Malek Ibn Ibrahim; Sheikh Abd al-Aziz ibn Baz, dean of the Islamic University of Medina; and Sheikh Mohammed Harkan, chief qadi of Jidda. Together these men represented the highest authority in the kingdom.

Saud refused to accept the council's decisions and mobilized the Royal Guard around Nasriyah Palace. In response, Faisal ordered the National Guard, then known as the White Army, to surround the palace and issued an ultimatum to the Royal Guard to withdraw. The Royal Guard yielded and took an oath of allegiance to Faisal.

On 28 March 1964 Saud signed a decree embodying the council's decisions. The decree provided for the withdrawal of the Royal Guard from Saud's personal command and its transfer to the Defense Ministry; the transfer of Saud's personal guard, known as the Khwyyan, to the Interior Ministry; the abolition of the royal court and its replacement by a special royal office; and the reduction of Saud's income from about $40 million a year to $20 million. At Saud's request, the decree was not published. Saud was left in full possession of his title but was described as a semi-invalid after years of medical treatment abroad for disorders of the kidneys, gall bladder, and liver, including eye surgery and treatment for a stomach ailment in Boston in 1961 and further treatment in Austria, Switzerland, and France in 1962 and 1963.

== Deposition of King Saud ==
In late October 1964 the royal family council and the council of ulema met again in Riyadh. The family council was composed of relatives of Faisal other than King Saud or Saud's sons. Tribal leaders and provincial governors were also brought to the capital. The councils resolved to depose King Saud and to proclaim Crown Prince Faisal as king.

A senior official of Saudi Arabia's Foreign Ministry said that Faisal had been confronted with the decision upon his arrival in Riyadh on 30 October, after a five-day drive overland from Jeddah. The official said it was "90 percent certain" that Faisal would accept, despite having rejected similar proposals in the past. "He has been under great pressure for the last six months and will find it difficult to decline now," the official added.

Faisal accepted, and in early November 1964 he took the title of king as well as the authority he already exercised. The accession was described as ratifying the earlier bloodless seizure of power. Saud left Saudi Arabia shortly afterward; the departure was attributed to reasons of health.

The decision to depose Saud stemmed from a desire to avoid a possible struggle over the succession: as long as Saud remained king, there was a possibility that he would attempt to reassert his royal prerogatives, as he had done briefly in 1960-62.

== Aftermath ==
The New York Times described the change as ending "the era of the palace-builders" and beginning "the era of the engineers in Saudi Arabia."
