= Hotat Khalid =

Extinct neighbourhood in Riyadh, Saudi Arabia

Hotat Khalid حوطة خالد
- Neighbourhood
- Interactive map of Hotat Khalid
- Coordinates: 24.63788°N 46.71227°E
- Country: Saudi Arabia
- City: Riyadh
- Region: Old Riyadh
- Named for: Khalid bin Abdulaziz

Language
  - Official: Arabic

Hotat Khalid (Arabic: حوطة خالد) was a settlement in Riyadh, Saudi Arabia, located north of Duhairah and south of al-Murabba. It was named after King Khalid bin Abdulaziz, who was allotted several acres of land in the area by his father, King Abdulaziz ibn Saud. It was a residential area inhabited by many prominent figures of that time, like Hafiz Wahba, Hussein Oweini and John Philby and today lies in the north of ad-Dirah neighborhood in the city's downtown. The Khaldia Towers was built in 1983 on the grounds of King Khalid's palace ruins.
