= Sedra (Riyadh) =

Sedra سدرة
- Integrated residential community
- Aerial view of Roshn Front, 2024

- Location within Saudi Arabia
- Coordinates: 24.85683°N 46.74543°E
- Country: Saudi Arabia
- City: Riyadh
- Proposed: 2019
- Established: 2020
- Opened: 2022
- Named for: Jujube tree

Government
  - Body: Al Rawdah Sub-Municipality
- Website: sedra.roshn.sa/en

Sedra (Arabic: سدرة, lit. 'endurance'), stylized as SEDRA, is a housing development project in northern Riyadh, Saudi Arabia, located east of Princess Nourah bint Abdul Rahman University and north of al-Munsiyah in the sub-municipality of al-Rawdah. Introduced in 2020, the master plan for the community was commissioned in 2019 and off-plan sale of units began in 2021 and was finally tenanted by residents in 2022. It incorporates elements of modern Najdi architecture and is named after Sidr, the Arabic word for a jujube tree found in Saudi Arabia and the larger Middle East region which is also mentioned in the Qur'an as Sidrat al-Muntaha. Sedra is the first integrated residential community project of Riyadh and the flagship project of Roshn.

== History and background ==
In August 2020, the Public Investment Fund of Saudi Arabia established Roshn, a real estate firm for the development of urban communities across the country. The project is slated to be developed in eight phases with 30,000 residential units spread across 20 million square meters.

=== Phase 1 ===
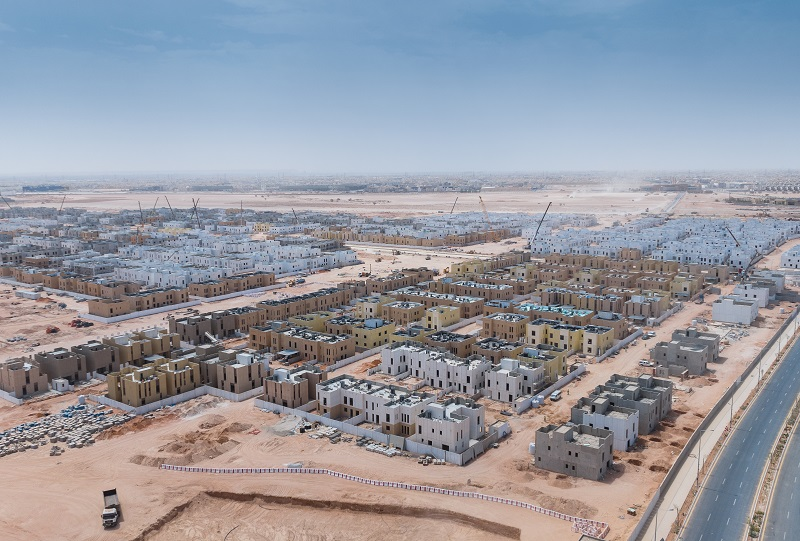
Sedra under construction during November 2022.

The contract for master plan for the community was awarded to Frankfurt-based Albert Speer + Partner GmbH in 2019. In November 2020, Roshn, a subsidiary of Public Investment Fund, officially announced the commencement of the first phase of Sedra project with 4,500 residential units and distributed contracts worth 1.6 billion Saudi riyals for the construction to local as well as multinational firms. Rezaik Abdullah Algedrawy Co. was appointed the main contractor for building more than 4,000 residential units in the first phase, which was jointly developed by Roshn as well as other developers. Firms like Zuhier Ahmed Zahran & Co., Akaria Hanmi, POSCO E&C Co., AWJ International, and C1 were given contracts for earthworks, setting up sales center, executing enabling works, site supervision and logistics. Dubai-based Shapoorji Pallonji Mideast and Siemens were assigned for utilities, landscaping and underground cabling in December 2020.

In October 2021, Roshn announced the off-plan sale of its residential units. In December 2021, Roshn signed an agreement with Retal Urban Development, a firm specializing in housing solutions for development in urban communities. The project was completed by November 2022.

=== Phase 2 ===
In October 2022, Roshn launched sales for 2172 new residential units in the second phase of the project. In December 2022, Saudi Real Estate Company (Al Akaria) purchased land worth 323.7 million Saudi riyals that included 290 residential units in 92450 square meters of area whereas Roshn acquired Riyadh Front and incorporated it into the district. Ajdan also signed an agreement with Roshn to develop and market a total of 80754 square meters. In September 2023, China Harbor was given contracts to build villa units in Sedra.

=== Phase 3 ===
In October 2023, Roshn announced sales for 3348 new units in the third phase of the project. In November 2023, Retal Urban Development signed a deal worth 100 million dollars to construct 636 housing units while Dar Al Arkan launched Elie Saab's branded residencies. In December 2023, Ajdan signed a deal worth 317 million Saudi riyals to develop 302 housing units.

== See also ==
- List of Saudi Vision 2030 projects
- Roshn Front
