= 2027 AFC Asian Cup =

Association football competition

AFC Asian Cup Saudi Arabia 2027

Tournament details
- Host country: Saudi Arabia
- Dates: 23 December 2027 – 21 January 2028
- Teams: 24 (from 1 confederation)
- Venues: 8 (in 3 host cities)

The 2027 AFC Asian Cup will be the 19th edition of the AFC Asian Cup, the quadrennial international men's football championship of Asia organised by the Asian Football Confederation (AFC). The tournament will involve 24 national teams after the expansion in 2019.

Originally scheduled to be held in Saudi Arabia from 7 January to 5 February 2027, the tournament was postponed to start from 23 December 2027 to 21 January 2028 due to "exceptional circumstances" associated with the Houthi–Saudi conflict and the 2026 Iran war.

The tournament would’ve returned to its usual four-year cycle if it wasn’t delayed, after the 2023 edition was postponed to 2024 due to the removal of China as hosts and high summer temperatures in Qatar. It will also be the final edition to take place in odd-numbered years, with the tournament switching back to even-numbered years (as was the case from 1956 to 2004) from the 2032 edition onwards.

Qatar are the two-time defending champions, having won their first two titles in 2019 and 2023.

== Host selection ==
AFC confirmed the list of member associations expressed their interests to host 2027 Asian Cup before the 30 June 2020 deadline, and they gave their necessary letters of undertaking in November. On 17 October 2022, the AFC Executive Committee announced that the host of the 2027 AFC Asian Cup would be chosen by the AFC Congress at its next meeting on 1 February 2023 in Manama, Bahrain. However, India, one of the last two bidders, withdrew on 5 December, leaving Saudi Arabia as the only remaining bidder. On 1 February, the AFC confirmed that Saudi Arabia won the bid and would host the tournament for the first time.

== Venues ==
Location of the host cities of the 2027 AFC Asian Cup.

The tournament will be played across eight stadiums in the cities of Riyadh, Jeddah, and Khobar.

City	Stadium	Capacity	Image
Riyadh	King Fahd Sports City Stadium	70,000 (after renovation)	
Riyadh	King Saud University Stadium	25,000	
Riyadh	Kingdom Arena	26,000	
Riyadh	Imam Mohammad Ibn Saud University Stadium	21,000 (after renovation)	
Riyadh	Al Shabab Stadium	14,000	
Jeddah	King Abdullah Sports City Stadium	60,000	
Jeddah	Prince Abdullah Al Faisal Sports City Stadium	25,000	
Khobar	Aramco Stadium	45,000 (new)	

== Teams ==
Qualification status Teams qualified Teams failed to qualify Withdrew or excluded Not an AFC member

The first two rounds of qualification acted as part of the Asian qualification for the 2026 FIFA World Cup. Saudi Arabia, which received automatic qualification for the Asian Cup as host, also participated in the qualifiers to qualify for the 2026 World Cup.

The Northern Mariana Islands, whose football association became the 47th full AFC member during the confederation's 30th Congress on 9 December 2020, was only eligible to enter the qualification tournament for the Asian Cup, but was ultimately excluded.

=== Qualified teams ===
Singapore qualified on merit for the first time, having only previously appeared in 1984 as hosts. Iran extended their qualification record, having qualified 16 straight times for every edition since 1968. None of the South Asian national teams qualified, a first since 2015 and only the second time since 2007. No new teams qualified for this edition, the first since 2011 and only the second time since 1992.

Team	Method of qualification	Date of qualification	Appearances			Previous best performance
Team	Method of qualification	Date of qualification	Total	First	Last	Previous best performance
Saudi Arabia	Hosts	1 February 2023	12th	1984	2023	Winners (1984, 1988, 1996)
Australia	Second round Group I winners	26 March 2024	6th	2007	2023	Winners (2015)
Iraq	Second round Group F winners	26 March 2024	11th	1972	2023	Winners (2007)
Iran	Second round Group E winners	26 March 2024	16th	1968	2023	Winners (1968, 1972, 1976)
Uzbekistan	Second round Group E runners-up	26 March 2024	9th	1996	2023	Fourth place (2011)
Qatar	Second round Group A winners	26 March 2024	12th	1980	2023	Winners (2019, 2023)
United Arab Emirates	Second round Group H winners	26 March 2024	12th	1980	2023	Runners-up (1996)
Japan	Second round Group B winners	2 April 2024	11th	1988	2023	Winners (1992, 2000, 2004, 2011)
South Korea	Second round Group C winners	6 June 2024	16th	1956	2023	Winners (1956, 1960)
Oman	Second round Group D winners	6 June 2024	6th	2004	2023	Round of 16 (2019)
Palestine	Second round Group I runners-up	6 June 2024	4th	2015	2023	Round of 16 (2023)
Bahrain	Second round Group H runners-up	6 June 2024	8th	1988	2023	Fourth place (2004)
Jordan	Second round Group G winners	6 June 2024	6th	2004	2023	Runners-up (2023)
China	Second round Group C runners-up	11 June 2024	14th	1976	2023	Runners-up (1984, 2004)
Indonesia	Second round Group F runners-up	11 June 2024	6th	1996	2023	Round of 16 (2023)
North Korea	Second round Group B runners-up	11 June 2024	6th	1980	2019	Fourth place (1980)
Kuwait	Second round Group A runners-up	11 June 2024	11th	1972	2015	Winners (1980)
Kyrgyzstan	Second round Group D runners-up	11 June 2024	3rd	2019	2023	Round of 16 (2019)
Syria	Third round Group E winners	14 October 2025	8th	1980	2023	Round of 16 (2023)
Singapore	Third round Group C winners	18 November 2025	2nd	1984		Group stage (1984)
Vietnam	Third round Group F winners	17 March 2026 (Note: On 26 September 2025, FIFA sanctioned the Football Association of Malaysia and seven players for using falsified eligibility documents. These players played in two qualification matches against Nepal and Vietnam. On 5 March 2026, the CAS upheld the sanctions, and the AFC overturned Malaysia's wins against Nepal (on 25 March 2025) and Vietnam (on 10 June 2025) to 0–3 defeats on 17 March 2026. The decision effectively qualified Vietnam and eliminated Malaysia, and this date represents the day that the decision was announced.)	6th	1956	2023	Fourth place (1956, 1960) (Note: Both as South Vietnam)
Thailand	Third round Group D winners	31 March 2026	9th	1972	2023	Third place (1972)
Tajikistan	Third round Group A winners	31 March 2026	2nd	2023		Quarter-finals (2023)
Yemen	Third round Group B winners	4 June 2026	2nd (Note: Yemen once qualified for the 1976 AFC Asian Cup as South Yemen, but according to FIFA and the AFC, the previous records of Yemen are registered as North Yemen instead.)	2019		Group stage (2019)

=== Draw ===
The draw was originally supposed to be held on 11 April 2026, but was postponed until 9 May 2026 (at the At-Turaif District in Diriyah) amidst concerns over the 2026 Iran war.

From the April 2026 FIFA World Rankings
Pot 1	Pot 2	Pot 3	Pot 4
Saudi Arabia (61) (hosts); Japan (18); Iran (21); South Korea (25); Australia (27); Uzbekistan (50)	Qatar (55); Iraq (57); Jordan (63); United Arab Emirates (68); Oman (79); Syria (84)	Bahrain (91); Thailand (93); China (94); Palestine (95); Vietnam (99); Tajikistan (103)	Kyrgyzstan (107); North Korea (118); Indonesia (122); Kuwait (134); Singapore (147); Yemen (149)

==== Draw result ====
The groups were confirmed following the draw:

Group A
Pos	Team
A1	Saudi Arabia
A2	Kuwait
A3	Oman
A4	Palestine

Group B
Pos	Team
B1	Uzbekistan
B2	Bahrain
B3	North Korea
B4	Jordan

Group C
Pos	Team
C1	Iran
C2	Syria
C3	Kyrgyzstan
C4	China

Group D
Pos	Team
D1	Australia
D2	Tajikistan
D3	Iraq
D4	Singapore

Group E
Pos	Team
E1	South Korea
E2	United Arab Emirates
E3	Vietnam
E4	Yemen

Group F
Pos	Team
F1	Japan
F2	Qatar
F3	Thailand
F4	Indonesia

== Officiating ==
On 24 September 2026, the AFC announced the list of 24 referees, 41 assistant referees, and 11 video match officials for the tournament.

Referees

- (Australia) Alex King
- (Australia) Alireza Faghani
- (Bahrain) Ammar Mahfoodh
- (China) Ma Ning
- (Iran) Mooud Bonyadifard
- (Iraq) Zaid Thamer Mohammed
- (Japan) Yusuke Araki
- (Jordan) Adham Makhadmeh
- (Kuwait) Abdullah Jamali
- (Kuwait) Ahmad Al-Ali
- (Lithuania) Donatas Rumšas
- (Malaysia) Nazmi Nasaruddin
- (Oman) Qasim Al-Hatmi
- (Qatar) Abdulrahman Al-Jassim
- (Qatar) Salman Falahi
- (Saudi Arabia) Mohammed Al-Hoish
- (Saudi Arabia) Khalid Al-Turais
- (South Korea) Choi Hyun-jai
- (South Korea) Kim Jong-hyeok
- (South Korea) Kim Yu-jeong
- (United Arab Emirates) Omar Al-Ali
- (United Arab Emirates) Adel Al-Naqbi
- (Uzbekistan) Asker Nadjafaliev
- (Uzbekistan) Ilgiz Tantashev

Assistant referees

- (Australia) George Lakrindis
- (Australia) James Andrew Lindsay
- (Australia) Andrew Meimarakis
- (Bahrain) Abdulla Al-Rowaimi
- (Bahrain) Mohamed Salman
- (China) Luo Zheng
- (China) Zhou Fei
- (Iran) Bahman Abdollahiharouni
- (Iran) Farhad Moravveji
- (Iraq) Ameer Al-Windawi
- (Iraq) Hayder Ubaydee
- (Japan) Ando Kohei
- (Japan) Watanabe Kota
- (Jordan) Mohammad Al-Kalaf
- (Jordan) Ahmad Al-Roalle
- (Kuwait) Ahmad Abbas
- (Kuwait) Ali Jraq
- (Kuwait) Saoud Al-Shemali
- (Lithuania) Aleksandr Radiuš
- (Lithuania) Dovydas Sužiedelis
- (Malaysia) Mohamad Mu Azi Bin Zainal Abidin
- (Malaysia) Mohamad Zairul Bin Khalil Tan
- (Oman) Hamed Al-Ghafri
- (Oman) Nasser Ambusaidi
- (Palestine) Heba Saadia
- (Qatar) Majid Al-Shammari
- (Qatar) Saoud Al-Maqaleh
- (Qatar) Taleb Al-Marri
- (Saudi Arabia) Zaid Al-Shammari
- (Saudi Arabia) Abdulrahim Al-Shammari
- (Saudi Arabia) Saad Al-Subaie
- (South Korea) Cheon Jin-hee
- (South Korea) Jang Jong-pil
- (South Korea) Park Kyun-yong
- (United Arab Emirates) Jasem Al-Ali
- (United Arab Emirates) Sabet Al-Ali
- (United Arab Emirates) Mohamed Al-Hammadi
- (Uzbekistan) Timur Gaynullin
- (Uzbekistan) Bakhtiyorkhuja Shavkatov
- (Uzbekistan) Andrey Tsapenko
- (Vietnam) Hà Thị Phượng

Video match officials

- (Australia) Shaun Evans
- (China) Fu Ming
- (Italy) Marco Di Bello
- (Japan) Jumpei Iida
- (Qatar) Khamis Al-Marri
- (Saudi Arabia) Abdullah Al-Shehri
- (Singapore) Muhammad Taqi
- (South Korea) Kim Woo-sung
- (Thailand) Sivakorn Pu-udom
- (United Arab Emirates) Mohammed Obaid Khadim
- (Uzbekistan) Firdavs Norsafarov

== Group stage ==
=== Group A ===
Pos	Team	Pld	W	D	L	GF	GA	GD	Pts	Qualification
1	Saudi Arabia (H)	0	0	0	0	0	0	0	0	Advance to knockout stage
2	Kuwait	0	0	0	0	0	0	0	0	Advance to knockout stage
3	Oman	0	0	0	0	0	0	0	0	Possible knockout stage based on ranking
4	Palestine	0	0	0	0	0	0	0	0	

First match(es) will be played: 23 December 2027. Source:
(H) Hosts
TBA

Saudi Arabia	Match 1	Palestine

King Fahd Sports City Stadium, Riyadh
TBA

Kuwait	Match 3	Oman

King Saud University Stadium, Riyadh

TBA

Palestine	Match 13	Kuwait

Aramco Stadium, Khobar
TBA

Oman	Match 15	Saudi Arabia

King Fahd Sports City Stadium, Riyadh

TBA

Oman	Match 27	Palestine

King Saud University Stadium, Riyadh
TBA

Saudi Arabia	Match 28	Kuwait

King Abdullah Sports City Stadium, Jeddah

=== Group B ===
Pos	Team	Pld	W	D	L	GF	GA	GD	Pts	Qualification
1	Uzbekistan	0	0	0	0	0	0	0	0	Advance to knockout stage
2	Bahrain	0	0	0	0	0	0	0	0	Advance to knockout stage
3	North Korea	0	0	0	0	0	0	0	0	Possible knockout stage based on ranking
4	Jordan	0	0	0	0	0	0	0	0	

First match(es) will be played: December 2027. Source:
TBA

Bahrain	Match 2	North Korea

Imam Mohammad Ibn Saud University Stadium, Riyadh
TBA

Uzbekistan	Match 4	Jordan

King Abdullah Sports City Stadium, Jeddah

TBA

North Korea	Match 14	Uzbekistan

Kingdom Arena, Riyadh
TBA

Jordan	Match 16	Bahrain

King Abdullah Sports City Stadium, Jeddah

TBA

North Korea	Match 25	Jordan

Imam Mohammad Ibn Saud University Stadium, Riyadh
TBA

Uzbekistan	Match 26	Bahrain

Prince Abdullah Al Faisal Sports City Stadium, Jeddah

=== Group C ===
Pos	Team	Pld	W	D	L	GF	GA	GD	Pts	Qualification
1	Iran	0	0	0	0	0	0	0	0	Advance to knockout stage
2	Syria	0	0	0	0	0	0	0	0	Advance to knockout stage
3	Kyrgyzstan	0	0	0	0	0	0	0	0	Possible knockout stage based on ranking
4	China	0	0	0	0	0	0	0	0	

First match(es) will be played: December 2027. Source:
TBA

Iran	Match 6	China

Kingdom Arena, Riyadh
TBA

Syria	Match 7	Kyrgyzstan

King Fahd Sports City Stadium, Riyadh

TBA

Kyrgyzstan	Match 17	Iran

Al Shabab Stadium, Riyadh
TBA

China	Match 19	Syria

Prince Abdullah Al Faisal Sports City Stadium, Jeddah

TBA

Iran	Match 29	Syria

King Fahd Sports City Stadium, Riyadh
TBA

Kyrgyzstan	Match 30	China

Kingdom Arena, Riyadh

=== Group D ===
Pos	Team	Pld	W	D	L	GF	GA	GD	Pts	Qualification
1	Australia	0	0	0	0	0	0	0	0	Advance to knockout stage
2	Tajikistan	0	0	0	0	0	0	0	0	Advance to knockout stage
3	Iraq	0	0	0	0	0	0	0	0	Possible knockout stage based on ranking
4	Singapore	0	0	0	0	0	0	0	0	

First match(es) will be played: December 2027. Source:
TBA

Australia	Match 5	Singapore

Aramco Stadium, Khobar
TBA

Tajikistan	Match 9	Iraq

Al Shabab Stadium, Riyadh

TBA

Iraq	Match 18	Australia

King Saud University Stadium, Riyadh
TBA

Singapore	Match 20	Tajikistan

Imam Mohammad Ibn Saud University Stadium, Riyadh

TBA

Australia	Match 31	Tajikistan

Al Shabab Stadium, Riyadh
TBA

Iraq	Match 32	Singapore

Aramco Stadium, Khobar

=== Group E ===
Pos	Team	Pld	W	D	L	GF	GA	GD	Pts	Qualification
1	South Korea	0	0	0	0	0	0	0	0	Advance to knockout stage
2	United Arab Emirates	0	0	0	0	0	0	0	0	Advance to knockout stage
3	Vietnam	0	0	0	0	0	0	0	0	Possible knockout stage based on ranking
4	Yemen	0	0	0	0	0	0	0	0	

First match(es) will be played: December 2027. Source: AFC
TBA

South Korea	Match 8	Yemen

King Abdullah Sports City Stadium, Jeddah
TBA

United Arab Emirates	Match 11	Vietnam

Imam Mohammad Ibn Saud University Stadium, Riyadh

TBA

Vietnam	Match 21	South Korea

Kingdom Arena, Riyadh
TBA

Yemen	Match 22	United Arab Emirates

King Fahd Sports City Stadium, Riyadh

TBA

South Korea	Match 35	United Arab Emirates

Imam Mohammad Ibn Saud University Stadium, Riyadh
TBA

Vietnam	Match 36	Yemen

Prince Abdullah Al Faisal Sports City Stadium, Jeddah

=== Group F ===
Pos	Team	Pld	W	D	L	GF	GA	GD	Pts	Qualification
1	Japan	0	0	0	0	0	0	0	0	Advance to knockout stage
2	Qatar	0	0	0	0	0	0	0	0	Advance to knockout stage
3	Thailand	0	0	0	0	0	0	0	0	Possible knockout stage based on ranking
4	Indonesia	0	0	0	0	0	0	0	0	

First match(es) will be played: December 2027. Source: AFC
TBA

Japan	Match 10	Indonesia

Prince Abdullah Al Faisal Sports City Stadium, Jeddah
TBA

Qatar	Match 12	Thailand

King Saud University Stadium, Riyadh

TBA

Thailand	Match 23	Japan

Al Shabab Stadium, Riyadh
TBA

Indonesia	Match 24	Qatar

Aramco Stadium, Khobar

TBA

Japan	Match 33	Qatar

King Saud University Stadium, Riyadh
TBA

Thailand	Match 34	Indonesia

King Abdullah Sports City Stadium, Jeddah

=== Ranking of third-placed teams ===
The four best third-placed teams from the six groups advanced to the knockout stage along with the six group winners and six runners-up.

Pos	Grp	Team	Pld	W	D	L	GF	GA	GD	Pts	Qualification
1	A	Oman	0	0	0	0	0	0	0	0	Advance to knockout stage
2	B	North Korea	0	0	0	0	0	0	0	0	Advance to knockout stage
3	C	Kyrgyzstan	0	0	0	0	0	0	0	0	Advance to knockout stage
4	D	Iraq	0	0	0	0	0	0	0	0	Advance to knockout stage
5	E	Vietnam	0	0	0	0	0	0	0	0	
6	F	Thailand	0	0	0	0	0	0	0	0	

First match(es) will be played: 23 December 2027. Source: AFC

== Knockout stage ==
In the knockout stage, extra time and a penalty shoot-out will be used to decide the winner if necessary.

Third-placed teams qualify from groups						1A vs	1B vs	1C vs	1D vs
A	B	C	D			3C	3D	3A	3B
A	B	C		E		3C	3A	3B	3E
A	B	C			F	3C	3A	3B	3F
A	B		D	E		3D	3A	3B	3E
A	B		D		F	3D	3A	3B	3F
A	B			E	F	3E	3A	3B	3F
A		C	D	E		3C	3D	3A	3E
A		C	D		F	3C	3D	3A	3F
A		C		E	F	3C	3A	3F	3E
A			D	E	F	3D	3A	3F	3E
	B	C	D	E		3C	3D	3B	3E
	B	C	D		F	3C	3D	3B	3F
	B	C		E	F	3E	3C	3B	3F
	B		D	E	F	3E	3D	3B	3F
		C	D	E	F	3C	3D	3F	3E

=== Bracket ===
Round of 16
TBA – Riyadh (Kingdom)
Runner-up Group A
Runner-up Group C
TBA – Riyadh (Imam Mohammad)
Winner Group D
Third Group B/E/F
TBA – Riyadh (Al Shabab)
Winner Group B
Third Group A/C/D
TBA – Riyadh (King Fahd)
Winner Group F
Runner-up Group E
TBA – Jeddah (King Abdullah)
Winner Group C
Third Group A/B/F
TBA – Riyadh (King Saud)
Winner Group E
Runner-up Group D
TBA – Khobar
Winner Group A
Third Group C/D/E
TBA – Jeddah (Prince Abdullah)
Runner-up Group B
Runner-up Group F

Quarter-finals
TBA – Riyadh (Kingdom)
Winner Match 37
Winner Match 39
TBA – Jeddah (King Abdullah)
Winner Match 38
Winner Match 41
TBA – Riyadh (King Fahd)
Winner Match 44
Winner Match 43
TBA – Khobar
Winner Match 40
Winner Match 42

Semi-finals
TBA – Khobar
Winner Match 46
Winner Match 45
TBA – Jeddah (King Abdullah)
Winner Match 47
Winner Match 48

Final
TBA – Riyadh (King Fahd)
Winner Match 49
Winner Match 50

All times are local, SAST (UTC+3).

=== Round of 16 ===
TBA

Runner-up Group A	Match 37	Runner-up Group C

Kingdom Arena, Riyadh

TBA

Winner Group B	Match 38	Third Group A/C/D

Al Shabab Stadium, Riyadh

TBA

Winner Group D	Match 39	Third Group B/E/F

Imam Mohammad Ibn Saud University Stadium, Riyadh

TBA

Winner Group A	Match 40	Third Group C/D/E

Aramco Stadium, Khobar

TBA

Winner Group F	Match 41	Runner-up Group E

King Fahd Sports City Stadium, Riyadh

TBA

Runner-up Group B	Match 42	Runner-up Group F

Prince Abdullah Al Faisal Sports City Stadium, Jeddah

TBA

Winner Group E	Match 43	Runner-up Group D

King Saud University Stadium, Riyadh

TBA

Winner Group C	Match 44	Third Group A/B/F

King Abdullah Sports City Stadium, Jeddah

=== Quarter-finals ===
TBA

Winner Match 38	Match 45	Winner Match 41

King Abdullah Sports City Stadium, Jeddah

TBA

Winner Match 37	Match 46	Winner Match 39

Kingdom Arena, Riyadh

TBA

Winner Match 44	Match 47	Winner Match 43

King Fahd Sports City Stadium, Riyadh

TBA

Winner Match 40	Match 48	Winner Match 42

Aramco Stadium, Khobar

=== Semi-finals ===
TBA

Winner Match 46	Match 49	Winner Match 45

Aramco Stadium, Khobar

TBA

Winner Match 47	Match 50	Winner Match 48

King Abdullah Sports City Stadium, Jeddah

=== Final ===
TBA

Winner Match 49	Match 51	Winner Match 50

King Fahd Sports City Stadium, Riyadh

== Marketing ==
=== Brand ===
The official logo was unveiled on 24 January 2026. It consists of a wordmark and a trophy symbol derived from Najdi stepped geometry, an architectural and decorative style native to Saudi Arabia. This geometric form, traditionally found in carved patterns, Al Sadu textiles, and regional ornamentation, is characterized by a stepped structure that emphasizes rhythm and balance. The logo is accompanied by decorative patterns referencing Najdi architectural motifs and traditional Saudi craftsmanship, commonly used in homes and doorways, symbolizing hospitality.

The tournament slogan, Ahlan Asia (Arabic: أهلاً آسيا), which translates to "Welcome Asia", was revealed on 9 May 2026 during the final draw.

=== Sponsorship ===
EA Sports FC became the official licensed product for the 2027 Asian Cup, replacing Konami's eFootball which served the role for the 2023 edition.

Official Global Partners

- Credit Saison
- Neom
- Qatar Airways
- Visit Saudi

Official Global Supporters

- Aspetar
- Albaik
- Kelme
- Midea Group
- Saudi Aramco
- Visa Inc.

Official Regional Partners

- Alrajhi Bank (For Saudi Arabia, in conjunction with Visa)
- APA Hotel (For Japan)
- Kirin Company (For Japan)

== Broadcasting rights ==
For the countries without broadcasting rights, the tournament is still available free via AFC Asian Cup Youtube channel.

Territory	Broadcaster(s)	Ref.
Afghanistan	ATN	
Africa	Azam TV	
Africa	Z Sports (Portuguese)	
Armenia	TV Start	
Azerbaijan	TV Start	
Belarus	TV Start	
Georgia	TV Start	
Russia	TV Start	
Australia	Network 10	
United States	Paramount+	
Canada	Paramount+	
Mexico	Paramount+	
Austria	Sportdigital	
Germany	Sportdigital	
Switzerland	Sportdigital	
Czechia	Sportdigital	
Liechtenstein	Sportdigital	
Luxembourg	Sportdigital	
Bangladesh	Tapmad	
Bhutan	Tapmad	
Nepal	Tapmad	
Pakistan	Tapmad	
Sri Lanka	Tapmad	
Bosnia and Herzegovina	Arena Sport	
Montenegro	Arena Sport	
North Macedonia	Arena Sport	
Serbia	Arena Sport	
Kosovo	Arena Sport	
Brunei	Astro Sports	
Malaysia	Astro Sports	
Bulgaria	Nova Sport	
Caribbean	ESPN	
Latin America	ESPN	
China	CMG	
China	Migu	
China	IQIYI	
Croatia	Sport Klub	
Slovenia	Sport Klub	
Romania	Sport Klub	
Hungary	Sport Klub	
Poland	Sport Klub	
Estonia	Poverkhnost	
Latvia	Poverkhnost	
Lithuania	Poverkhnost	
Moldova	Poverkhnost	
Ukraine	Poverkhnost	
Netherlands	Triller TV	
United Kingdom	Triller TV	
France	Triller TV	
Belgium	Triller TV	
Ireland	Triller TV	
Italy	OneFootball	
Portugal	LaLiga+	
Spain	LaLiga+	
Denmark	C More Sports	
Sweden	C More Sports	
Finland	C More Sports	
Norway	C More Sports	
Iceland	C More Sports	
Uzbekistan	Saran Media International	
Turkmenistan	Saran Media International	
Tajikistan	Saran Media International	
Kyrgyzstan	Saran Media International	
Cambodia	Hang Meas	
Hong Kong	I-CABLE HOY	
India	FanCode	
Indonesia	MNC Media	
East Timor	MNC Media	
Japan	DAZN	
Kazakhstan	Quest Media	
Laos	KJSM World	
Macau	TDM	
Macau	M Plus	
Myanmar	Canal+	
MENA	beIN Sports	
Pacific	PacificAus TV	
South Korea	Coupang Play	
Singapore	Mediacorp	
Taiwan	ELTA	
Thailand	BG Sports	
Türkiye	D-Smart	
Vietnam	TV360	
Vietnam	VTV	

== Discipline ==
A player or team official is automatically suspended for the next match of the tournament for the following offenses:

- Receiving a red card (red card suspensions may be extended for serious offenses).
- Receiving two yellow cards in the tournament; (Note: As yellow cards are not carried forward to penalty shoot-outs, players may be shown two yellow cards in the same match without being sent off. However, this would result in a suspension for accumulating two yellow cards during the tournament.)

The following suspensions will be served during the tournament:

Tournament suspensions for players and team officials
Player	Offense(s)	Suspension(s)
(Vietnam national football team) Nguyễn Đình Bắc	(red card) in 2026 AFC U-23 Asian Cup vs South Korea U-23 (23 January 2026)	Group E vs United Arab Emirates (matchday 1); Group E vs South Korea (matchday 2) (Note: Nguyễn Đình Bắc was handed a two-match ban, since he no longer participates in any U-23 tournaments, the suspension has been transferred to the national team level.)
(Qatar national football team) Assim Madibo	(red card) in 2026 FIFA World Cup vs Canada (18 June 2026)	Group F vs Thailand (matchday 1); Group F vs Indonesia (matchday 2); Group F vs Japan (matchday 3) (Note: Madibo was handed a five-match ban, of which one was served during the final group game vs Bosnia and Herzegovina. If Qatar fails to reach the round of 16, the final match of the suspension will be carried over to the next competitive match.)

== See also ==
- Football in Saudi Arabia
