= Prince Mohamed bin Fahd Stadium =

Stadium in Dammam, Saudi Arabia

Prince Mohammad bin Fahd Stadium
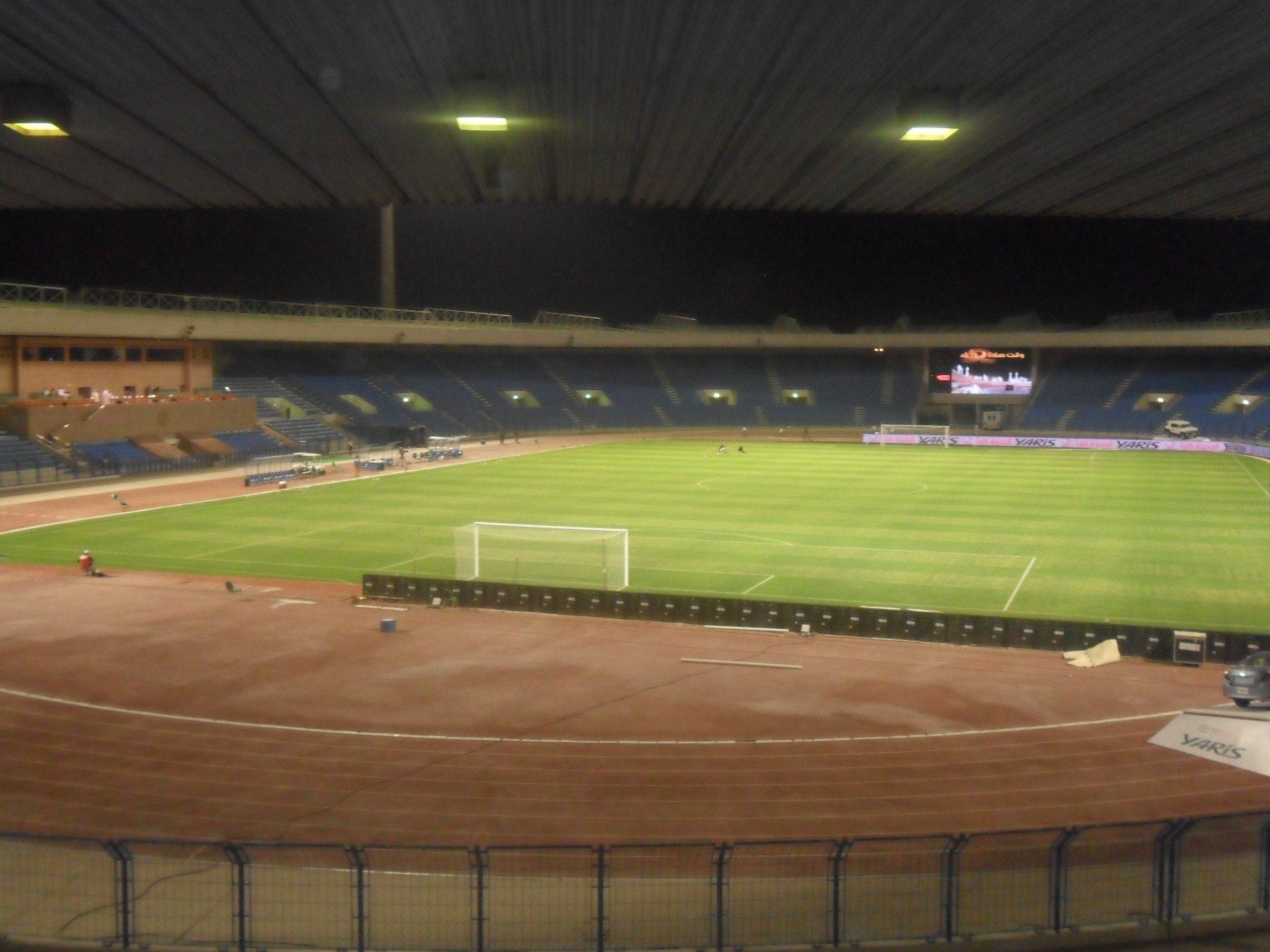
- Interactive map of Prince Mohammad bin Fahd Stadium
- Location: Dammam, Saudi Arabia
- Owner: Ministry of Sport
- Operator: Ministry of Sport
- Capacity: 26,000
- Surface: Grass

Construction
- Opened: 1973

Tenants
- Al-Ettifaq (1973–2023); Al-Qadsiah (1973–present); Al-Nahda (1973–present); Al-Khaleej (selected matches); Eastern Flames; Saudi Arabia national football team (selected matches)

The Prince Mohammad bin Fahd Stadium is a multi-purpose stadium in Dammam, Saudi Arabia.

== History ==
Mohammad bin Fahd Stadium was built in 1973 and named after Mohammad bin Fahd, the former governor of the Eastern Province. It was the first football stadium in the province.

The venue is used mostly for football matches and has been the home stadium of the local clubs Al-Ettifaq and Al-Nahda. However, Al-Ettifaq moved out after the construction of their new stadium. The stadium is also used by Al-Qadsiah, although they will relocate once the Aramco Stadium is completed. Additionally, Al-Khaleej uses the stadium for selected matches.

The stadium's capacity is 26,000 and it covers an area of 105,929.06 square meters. It was the first football stadium in the province.

== International matches hosted ==
| Date | Competition | Team #1 | Res. | Team #2 | Attendance |
|---|---|---|---|---|---|
| 31 December 2010 | Friendly | Saudi Arabia | 0–1 | Iraq | |
| 26 March 2024 | 2026 FIFA World Cup qualification | Syria | 7–0 | Myanmar | 3,252 |

== See also ==
- List of football stadiums in Saudi Arabia
