= King Abdullah Mosque =

World's most elevated mosque in Riyadh, Saudi Arabia

- Arabic: مسجد الملك عبدالله
- Location of the mosque in Saudi Arabia

Religion
- Affiliation: Sunni Islam
- Ecclesiastical or organizational status: Mosque
- Status: Active

Location
- Location: Kingdom Centre, al-Olaya, Riyadh
- Country: Saudi Arabia
- Interactive map of King Abdullah Mosque
- Coordinates: 24°42′41″N 46°40′28″E

Architecture
- Type: Mosque architecture
- Funded by: Al Waleed bin Talal
- Established: 13 October 2003
- Completed: 2004

Specifications
- Interior area: 110 m^{2} (1,200 sq ft)
- Dome: 1
- Elevation: 183 m (600 ft)

The King Abdullah Mosque (Arabic: مسجد الملك عبدالله), formerly Prince Abdullah Mosque and officially as the Mosque of King Abdullah bin Abdulaziz Al Saud (Arabic: مسجد الملك عبدالله بن عبدالعزيز آل سعود), is a mosque in the al-Olaya district of Riyadh, Saudi Arabia, located on the 77th floor of the Kingdom Centre. Situated 183 metres (600 ft) above the ground level, it holds the Guinness World Record for being the most elevated mosque in the world. It was opened in 2003 and covers an area of 110 square metres (1,200 sq ft). The mosque is named after King Abdullah bin Abdulaziz and its construction was primarily funded by Prince Al Waleed bin Talal.

== Overview ==
In 2003, Spazio restaurant was established with assistance from Prince Al Waleed bin Talal on the 77th floor of the Kingdom Centre.

As the number of customers to the restaurant grew, the absence of a place of worship led the administration to build a mosque. In October 2003, Crown Prince Abdullah bin Abdulaziz established the Prince Abdullah Mosque as an annex to the restaurant. The construction of the mosque was funded by Prince Al Waleed bin Talal. Following the enthronement of Crown Prince Abdullah bin Abdulaziz as the new monarch in 2005, the mosque was renamed to King Abdullah Mosque.

In 2010, following the inauguration of Burj Khalifa in Dubai, the BBC and other media outlets reported the presence of a mosque on either the 158th or 154th floor of the Burj Khalifa skyscraper, reportedly making that supposed mosque the world's most elevated mosque at 600 metres (2,000 ft) above ground level. However, the claim of a mosque in the Burj Khalifa skyscraper was met with rebuttal from Emaar Properties, leaving the King Abdullah Mosque to retain its title.

== See also ==
- Islam in Saudi Arabia
- List of mosques in Saudi Arabia
- List of things named after Saudi kings
