= Roshn Front =

Business and leisure development in Riyadh, Saudi Arabia

- واجهة روشن

- Aerial view of Roshn Front, 2024
- Location: Sedra, Riyadh, Saudi Arabia
- Opened: 10 October 2019; 7 years ago
- Developer: Kaden Investment Company
- Owner: Roshn
- Floor area: 500 square kilometres (50,000 ha)
- Website: roshnfront.sa

Roshn Front (Arabic: واجهة روشن), formerly Riyadh Front (Arabic: واجهة الرياض), is a mega business and leisure development in Sedra, Riyadh, Saudi Arabia, located east of Princess Nora bint Abdul Rahman University. Primarily active during the Riyadh Season entertainment festival, it was inaugurated in 2019 and is categorically split into 'Shopping' and 'Business' areas, with the latter serving as a business park. It was acquired by Roshn in 2022.

== History ==
Riyadh Front was inaugurated on October 10, 2019, during the kick-off of the 2019 edition of Riyadh Season as one of its zones. Its launch was announced by the chairman of the General Entertainment Authority Turki al-Sheikh through his official Twitter handle.

Within a month of its inauguration in October 2019, Riyadh Front inaugurated the Vox Cinemas and hosted the Riyadh Toy Festival, Insomnia Gaming Festival, Stan Lee Super Con-kick in November 2019 and the PUBG MOBILE Star Challenge (PMSC) World Cup, a tournament of PUBG Mobile players in December 2019.

In January 2020, the Saudi culture ministry made Riyadh Front the new headquarters of the Riyadh International Book Fair. It hosted the Baloot Championship in February 2020, a Baloot tournament held for women participants. In March 2020, the World Health Organization declared coronavirus a global pandemic and King Salman ordered a three-week nationwide curfew, resulting in the indefinite closure of the Riyadh Front.

Riyadh Front was also one of the zones during the 2021 edition of Riyadh Season. In September 2023, it was renamed as Roshn Front following its acquisition by Roshn Group

== See also ==
- Laysen Valley
