= Princess Latifa bint Sultan Mosque =

Sunni mosque in Riyadh, Saudi Arabia

- Arabic: جامع الأميرة لطيفة بنت سلطان
- Location of the mosque in Saudi Arabia

Religion
- Affiliation: Sunni Islam
- Ecclesiastical or organizational status: Friday mosque
- Leadership: Sheikh Nasser bin Ali Al-Qatami (Imam)
- Status: Active

Location
- Location: Al-Ma'dher, Riyadh
- Country: Saudi Arabia
- Interactive map of Princess Latifa bint Sultan Mosque
- Coordinates: 24°43′9″N 46°39′31″E

Architecture
- Type: Mosque architecture
- Completed: 2013

Specifications
- Capacity: 7,000 worshippers
- Dome: 1
- Minaret: 2
- Site area: 300,000 m^{2} (74 acres)

The Princess Latifa bint Sultan bin Abdulaziz Mosque (Arabic: جامع الأميرة لطيفة بنت سلطان بن عبد العزيز) is a Sunni Islam Friday mosque in the al-Rahmaniyah neighborhood of Riyadh, Saudi Arabia. Opened in 2013, it is named after Princess Latifa bint Sultan Al Saud, the daughter of Saudi crown prince Sultan bin Abdulaziz and granddaughter of King Abdulaziz ibn Saud, the founder of Saudi Arabia.

== Overview ==
The mosque was opened on 7 July 2013 during the reign of King Abdullah bin Abdulaziz and was built by an Indian construction firm. The mosque was named after Princess Latifa bint Sultan Al Saud, the daughter of Saudi crown prince Sultan bin Abdulaziz and granddaughter of King Abdulaziz ibn Saud.

The mosque usually gets flocked by worshippers during the month of Ramadan to perform Taraweeh prayers and on religious holidays like Eid al-Fitr and Eid al-Adha for Salat al-Eid. It covers an area of 300,000 square metres (74 acres) and can accommodate approximately 7,000 worshippers.

As of 2023, the inaugural Imam, Sheikh Nasser bin Ali Al-Qatami, appointed in 2013, continued to lead the congregation.

== See also ==
- Islam in Saudi Arabia
- List of mosques in Saudi Arabia
