= Kingdom Centre =

Skyscraper in Riyadh, Saudi Arabia

Kingdom Center
- مركز المملكة
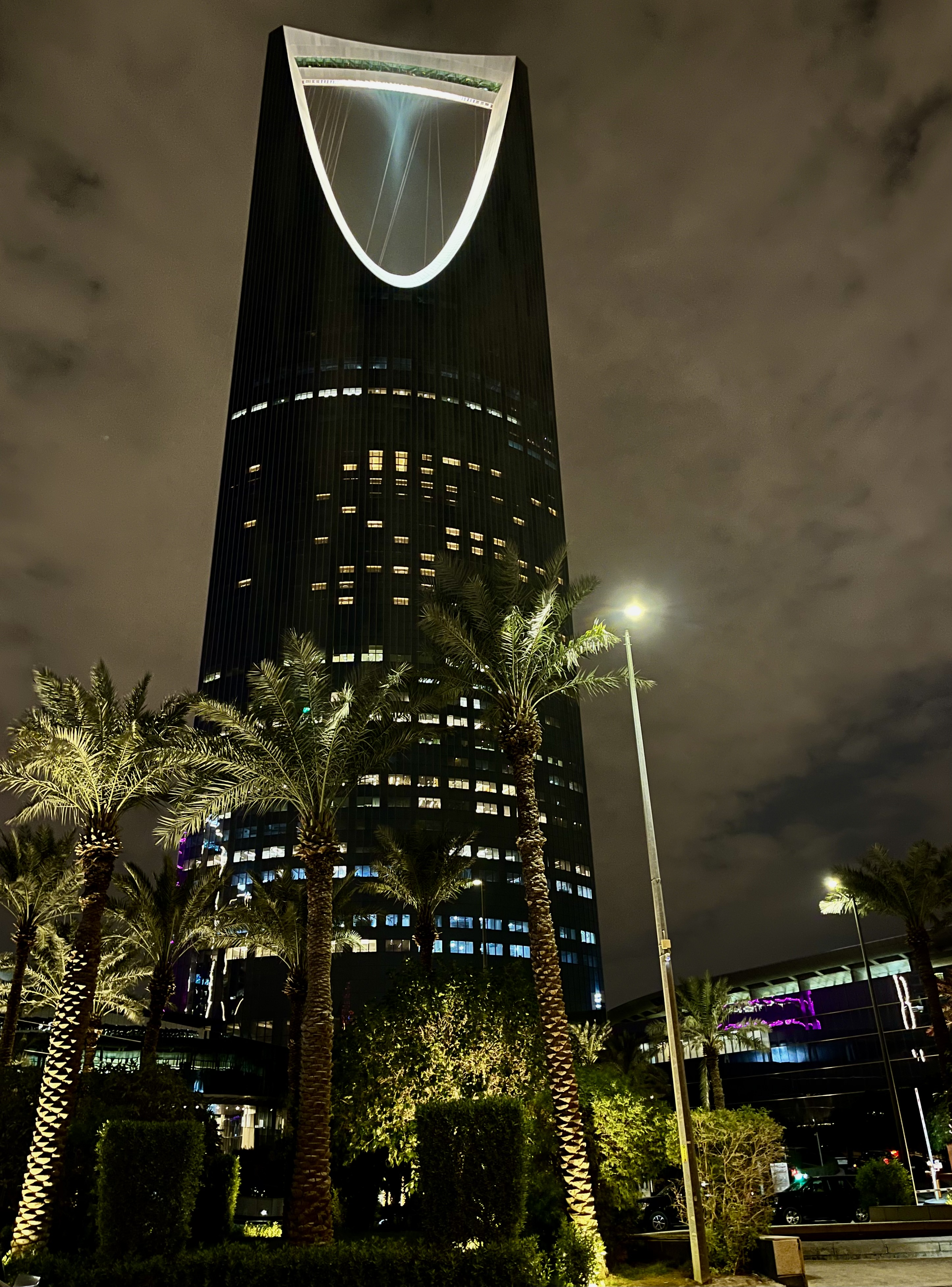
- Kingdom Centre, 2024

- Location within Saudi Arabia
- Alternative names: Riyadh City Center

Record height
- Tallest in Saudi Arabia from 2002 to 2012^{[I]}
- Preceded by: Al Faisaliah Tower
- Surpassed by: The Clock Towers

General information
- Status: Completed
- Type: Commercial offices Residential condominiums Hotel
- Architectural style: Modernism
- Location: King Fahad Road Saudi Arabia
- Coordinates: 24.7113°N 46.6744°E
- Construction started: 1999
- Completed: 2002
- Cost: SR 1.7 billion (US$453 million)

Height
- Architectural: 302.3 m (991.80 ft)
- Top floor: 290.4 m (952.76 ft)
- Observatory: 290.4 m (952.76 ft)

Technical details
- Floor count: 99
- Floor area: 185,000 m^{2} (1,991,323 ft^{2})
- Lifts/elevators: 45

Design and construction
- Architect: Ellerbe Becket Omrania
- Developer: Kingdom Holding Company
- Engineer: Arup
- Main contractor: EL-Seif Engineering Contracting & Salini Impregilo (Webuild)

Kingdom Centre (Arabic: مركز المملكة), formerly Kingdom Tower, is a 99-story, 302.3 m (992 ft) skyscraper in the al-Olaya district of Riyadh, Saudi Arabia. When completed in 2002, it overtook the 267-meter (876 ft) Faisaliah Tower as the tallest tower in Saudi Arabia. It has since been surpassed and, as of 2021, is the fifth-tallest skyscraper in the country, whose tallest two buildings are The Clock Towers and the Capital Market Authority Tower. It is the world's third-tallest building with a hole, after the Shanghai World Financial Center and the 85 Sky Tower in Taiwan. It contains the King Abdullah Mosque, which is the world's most elevated mosque from ground level.

The tower was developed by Prince Al-Waleed bin Talal, and designed by the team of Ellerbe Becket and Omrania, who were selected through an international design competition. It is situated on a 100,000–square-metre site and houses the 57,000-square-meter Al-Mamlaka shopping mall, offices, the Four Seasons Hotel Riyadh, and luxury apartments. There is a 65m skybridge atop the skyscraper.

The upper third of the tower features an inverted parabolic arch topped by a public skybridge. The skybridge is a 300-ton steel structure, taking the form of an enclosed corridor with windows on both sides. After paying the admission fees, visitors take two elevators to reach that level.

== Design ==
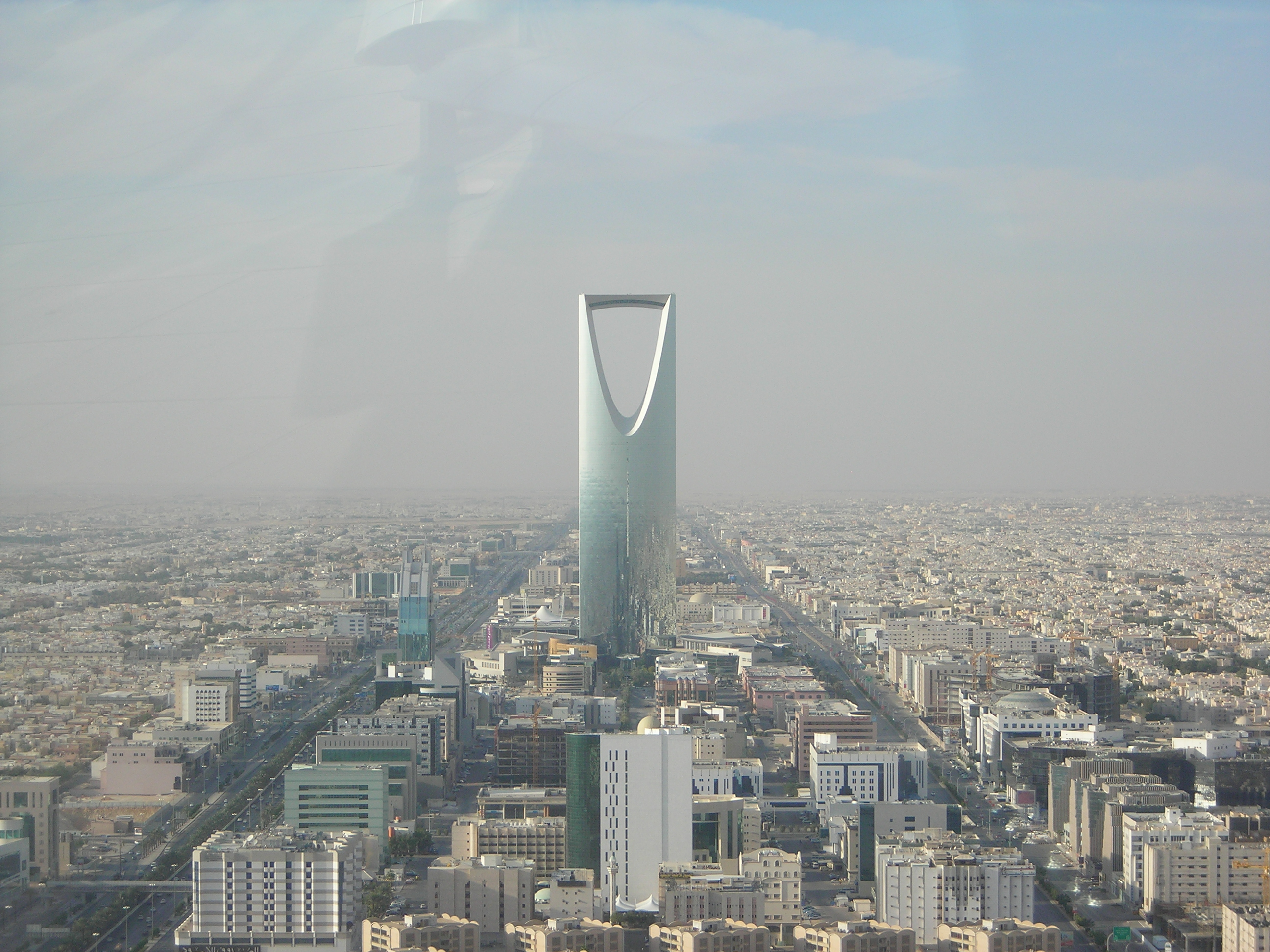
Daytime view of Kingdom Centre

The Kingdom Centre was designed by the US-based architecture firm Ellerbe Becket in a joint venture with the Riyadh-based architecture and engineering firm Omrania and Associates. The building is composed of a tower and a podium comprising two symmetrical wings. The tower's almond-shaped plan and curving forms gives the building a distinctive shape that helps keep it cool, with the narrow ends facing the east and west where heat gain is greatest. A high-performance curtain wall, made from silver, butt-jointed reflective glazing, also helps control heat gain while concealing the three main mechanical floors to create a seamless facade.

At the top of the tower, an inverted arch is spanned by a glass skybridge housing a public observation deck. The large opening allows the building to rise higher than the height limit—30 occupied floors—mandated by local laws. Its design was inspired by iconic structures from around the world, including the Gateway Arch in St. Louis, The Sydney Harbour Bridge, and the Eiffel Tower.

From base to top, the tower house 13 floors of offices, 10 stories of hotel, five stories of luxury apartments, and additional office space at the top. The east wing of the podium houses the Al-Mamlaka shopping mall, which features more than 150 stores divided across three levels - the first targeted to young people, the second to fashion and furnishings, and the third level is reserved for women. The west wing houses event and entertainment spaces.

The building is nicknamed the "bottle opener" due to the shape of the opening at the top.

=== Structure ===
The Kingdom Center is built on a four-meter-thick, 3,100-square-meter raft foundation. Its structure consists of two systems: reinforced concrete columns, beams, and core for the first 180 meters, and a tubular steel frame structure for the building's remaining height.

=== Mechanical systems ===
A multi-part mechanical system was created to accommodate the building's mixed-use program. The tower is cooled by a central chilled water plant, supported by a thermal energy storage system that provides 5,000 tons of cooling capacity. This storage system is used during the hottest hours of the day, allowing the building to shift cool-air production to off-peak hours when electrical demand is lowest.

The podium structures are served by separate mechanical systems designed to accommodate the needs of the building's unique programs. Systems used to cool these spaces include variable air volume, constant volume, and fan coils.

== See also ==
- List of tourist attractions in Riyadh

=== Similar towers ===
- Shanghai World Financial Center, building in China

=== Other towers ===
- Al Faisaliyah Center
- List of tallest buildings in Saudi Arabia
- Jeddah Tower

Records
Preceded by Al Faisaliyah Center	Tallest building in Saudi Arabia; 2002–2012; 302.3 metres (992 ft)	Succeeded by The Clock Towers (Makkah Clock Tower)
