= Roshn =

Saudi Arabian real estate development group

Roshn Group
- Native name: مجموعة روشن
- Type: Private
- Industry: Real Estate Developer
- Founded: 19 August 2020; 6 years ago
- Founder: Public Investment Fund
- Headquarters: Riyadh, Saudi Arabia
- Key people: Mohammed Bin Salman (Chairman); Yasir Al-Rumayyan (Vice Chairman); Sabah Barakat (Acting CEO)
- Owner: Public Investment Fund
- Website: roshn.sa

Roshn (stylized as ROSHN) is a Saudi Arabian real estate development group established in August 2020 by the Public Investment Fund (PIF) as one of its giga-projects. It aims to develop residential communities and support the goals of Saudi Vision 2030 by increasing homeownership among Saudi citizens across the Kingdom.

== History ==
Roshn was officially launched by the Saudi Public Investment Fund on 19 August 2020 as one of its 5 megaprojects, which are: Neom, Red Sea Project, Qiddiya City, and Diriyah Company.

On 24 August 2022, Roshn secured naming rights to the Saudi Pro League in a five-year deal worth $127 million.

Following Karim Benzema's signing with Ittihad football club in June 2023, Roshn signed a three-year deal with the club to become its platinum sponsor.

In September 2023, Roshn signed a 45-month deal worth $2.06 billion with China Harbour Engineering Company to develop Riyadh's Sedra and Warefa communities.

== Projects ==
=== Communities ===
The following list contains all of the residential communities currently being developed by Roshn:

Name	Location	Total Area (km^{2})	Announced	Website
Sedra	Northern Riyadh	20	4 August 2021	www.roshn.sa/communities/sedra
Warefa	Eastern Riyadh	1.4	7 March 2022	www.roshn.sa/communities/warefa
Al-Arous	Northern Jeddah	4	24 May 2022	www.roshn.sa/communities/alarous
Marafy	Northern Jeddah	6.6	29 August 2023	www.roshn.sa/marafy
Al-Fulwa	Southern Hofuf	10.8	14 March 2024	www.roshn.sa/communities/alfulwa
Al-Manar	Western Mecca	21	31 March 2024	www.roshn.sa/communities/almanar
Al-Danah	Dhahran	1.7	24 April 2024	www.roshn.sa/communities/aldanah

=== Roshn Stadium ===
In July 2024, Roshn announced “Roshn Stadium”, a stadium with a capacity of 45,000 in Southwest Riyadh. The stadium spans over an area of more than 450,000 square meters. Roshn Stadium is set to host 2034 FIFA World Cup matches.

== Awards ==
- Saudi Arabia's Best Place to work for the years 2021, 2022, and 2023 presented by bestplacestoworkfor.org

== See also ==
- Roshn Front
- Public Investment Fund
- List of Saudi Vision 2030 projects
