= Four Points by Sheraton Riyadh Khaldia =

Mixed-use skyscraper in Riyadh, Saudi Arabia

- Four Points by Sheraton Riyadh Khaldia, 2024
- Former names: Mena Grand Khaldia Hotel; Khaldia Towers

General information
- Type: Hotel
- Location: Riyadh, Saudi Arabia
- Coordinates: 24.63788°N 46.71227°E
- Named for: Khalid bin Abdulaziz
- Construction started: 1976
- Completed: 1983
- Opened: 29 February 1984; 42 years ago

Technical details
- Floor count: 33

Design and construction
- Architect: Dr. Nasser bin Ibrahim al-Rasheed

Four Points by Sheraton Riyadh Khaldia, formerly Mena Grand Khaldia Hotel (Arabic: فندق مينا جراند الخالدية) and Khaldia Towers (Arabic: أبراج الخالدية المستديرة), is a 33-floor mixed-use skyscraper in the ad-Dirah neighborhood of Riyadh, Saudi Arabia. Built in 1984, it is named after King Khalid bin Abdulaziz. It was later bought by Starwood Hotels and Resorts in 2013, which itself got acquired by Marriott International in 2016. It is one of the most popular landmarks in Riyadh and is situated in the al-Batʼha commercial area.

== Overview ==
Khaldia Towers was built between 1976 and 1983 and was named after King Khalid bin Abdulaziz, whose sons had donated the land of his ruined palace situated in Hotat Khalid for the construction of the mixed-use development. It was designed by Dr. Nasser bin Ibrahim al-Rasheed through his engineering consultant firm, who was a former professor at the King Fahd University for Petroleum and Minerals.

It is owned by Khaldia Towers Company, a partnership between Al-Jedaie Group and Al-Hokair Group. It has 376 rooms in total and 138 suites.

In 2007, the King Khalid Charitable Foundation put the Khaldia Towers on sale and began inviting investors to acquire the property.

In 2013, it was bought by Starwood Hotels and Resorts from Mena Hotels & Resorts and was rebranded as Four Points by Sheraton Riyadh Khaldia. It was inaugurated by Prince Khalid bin Bandar, the-then governor of Riyadh Province.

=== 2014 fire accident ===
In September 2014, an unexpected fire broke out in the building of the hotel, resulting in three dead, including an Egyptian national and seven injured. The Saudi Red Crescent Authority dispatched 10 paramedic teams and 4 advance response teams towards the site, after which the injured were sent to the King Saud Medical City and al-Iman Hospital following their rescue.

== See also ==
- Crowne Plaza Riyadh Palace
