= Al Ma'dhar Sub-Municipality =

Baladiyah al-Ma'dher بلدية المعذر
- Baladiyah
- Country: Saudi Arabia
- City: Riyadh

Government
  - Body: Riyadh Municipality

Baladiyah al-Maʼdhar (Arabic: بلدية المعذر), in English as al-Maʼdhar Sub-Municipality, is a baladiyah and one of the 16 sub-municipalities of Riyadh, Saudi Arabia. It consists of 9 neighborhoods and districts, partially including al-Olaya and is responsible for their overall planning, development and maintenance.

== Neighborhoods and districts ==
- Al-Nakhil
- Al-Nakhil al-Gharbi
- Al-Muhammadiyah
- Al-Rahmaniyah
- Al-Ra'id
- Umm al-Hammam al-Gharbi
- Umm al-Hammam al-Sharqi
- Al-Ma'dher al-Shimali
- Al Olaya (partially)
