= Al Dakheel Mosque =

Sunni mosque in Riyadh, Saudi Arabia

Al-Dakheel Mosque
- Arabic: جامع الدخيل
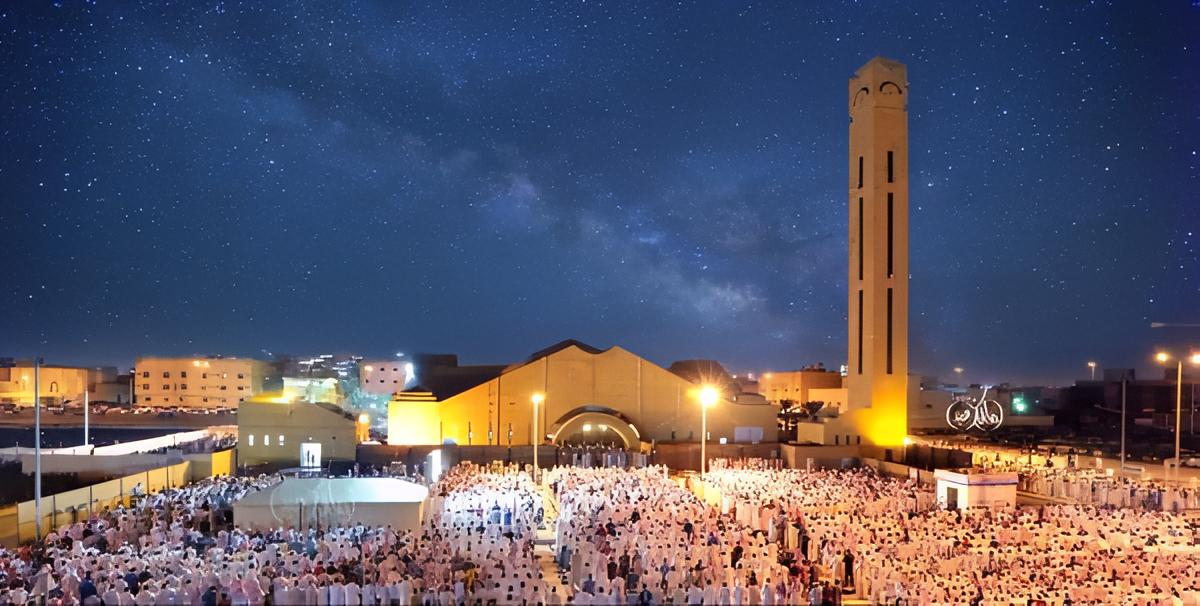
- Al Dakheel Mosque

- Location of the mosque in Saudi Arabia

Religion
- Affiliation: Sunni Islam
- Ecclesiastical or organisational status: Mosque
- Status: Active

Location
- Location: Riyadh
- Country: Saudi Arabia
- Coordinates: 24°47′41″N 46°44′16″E

Architecture
- Type: Mosque architecture
- Style: Modern Najdi
- Groundbreaking: 2000
- Completed: 2004

Specifications
- Capacity: 3,000 worshippers
- Dome: 1
- Dome height (outer): 18 m (59 ft)
- Dome dia. (outer): 10 m (33 ft)
- Minaret: 1
- Minaret height: 50 m (160 ft)
- Site area: 7,000 m^{2} (75,000 sq ft)

The Sheikh Fahd bin Abdul Rahman bin Fahd al-Dakheel Mosque (Arabic: جامع الشيخ فهد بن عبد الرحمن بن فهد الدخيل), simply known as al-Dakheel Mosque (Arabic: جامع الدخيل), is a Sunni Islam Friday mosque, located in the ash-Shuhada neighborhood of Riyadh, Saudi Arabia.

The mosque was opened in 2004.

== Overview ==
Construction of the mosque began in 2000 and completed in 2004 and was built in the ash-Shuhada neighborhood of Riyadh. The mosque has a minaret that is 50 m (160 ft) high and a dome that is 18 m (59 ft) high. The mosque can accommodate approximately 1,800 worshippers during off-season and 3,000 worshippers at its maximum. The numbers reach 7,000 in the month of Ramadan when the space surrounding the mosque gets in use.

Yasir al-Dawsari served as the imam of the mosque from its opening until he was appointed as one of the imams of Masjid al-Haram in Mecca.

== See also ==
- Islam in Saudi Arabia
- List of mosques in Saudi Arabia
