= Souq al-Hilla =

Traditional souq in Riyadh, Saudi Arabia

- Native name: سوق الحلة
- Namesake: Hillat al-Ahrar
- Location: Riyadh, Saudi Arabia
- Coordinates: 24.63079°N 46.71891°E

Souq al-Hilla (Arabic: سوق الحلة, lit. 'the quarter market'), also known as Souq al-Mūsīqi (Arabic: سوق الموسيقى, lit. 'the music market') is a traditional marketplace (souq) and a popular tourist attraction in the al-Owd neighborhood of Riyadh, Saudi Arabia, located in the al-Bat'ha commercial area. It emerged in 1955 in the present-day ad-Dirah neighborhood, and was later relocated to Hillat al-Ahrar during the expansion of the metropolis. The souq includes more than 50 shops that specialize in the sale of musical instruments, such as Oud and Rebab. The souq gets flocked by locals during the month of Ramadan to purchase household items for decoration and is also known to be a major wet market.

The souq thrived between the 1960s and 1980s, a time considered to be the golden era for music and singing in Saudi Arabia, but was severely impacted from the 1980s onward when religious clerics were given more authority over public life in the country. The souq has been visited by artists like Talal Maddah, Naseer Shamma, Taher al-Ahsa'i, Saad Abdullah al-Houti and Mazal bin Farhan.
