= Salam Mosque =

Mosque in Riyadh, Saudi Arabia

- Arabic: مسجد سلام
- Salam Mosque, 2026

- Location within Saudi Arabia

Religion
- Affiliation: Sunni Islam
- Ecclesiastical or organizational status: Mosque
- Status: Active

Location
- Location: Salam Park, Riyadh
- Country: Saudi Arabia
- Interactive map of Salam Mosque
- Coordinates: 24°37′16″N 46°42′32″E

Architecture
- Type: Mosque architecture
- Founder: Prince Abdullah bin Abdul Rahman
- Completed: 1941 (original); 2003 (restored)

Specifications
- Minaret: 1
- Materials: Reinforced concrete

Salam Mosque (Arabic: مسجد سلام), formerly Prince Abdullah bin Abdul Rahman Al Faisal Mosque (Arabic: مسجد الأمير عبد الله بن عبد الرحمن الفيصل), is a historic mosque in Riyadh, Saudi Arabia, located within the precincts of Salam Park. Built in 1941 by Prince Abdullah bin Abdul Rahman, it is one of the first mosques in the city constructed using reinforced concrete. It was renovated in 2003 by the Royal Commission for Riyadh City during the development of the Salam Park project.

== History ==
The mosque was constructed in 1941 by Prince Abdullah bin Abdul Rahman using reinforced concrete at his private orchard, which was called Salam. It is one of the first mosques in Riyadh that was built using reinforced concrete. Sheikh Abdullah bin Abdul Rahman bin Ali Al Hamdan was appointed as the first imam of the mosque following its construction.

The mosque was renovated in 2003 by the Royal Commission for Riyadh City when the orchard underwent renovation as part of the Salam Park project.

== See also ==
- Islam in Saudi Arabia
- List of mosques in Saudi Arabia
