= Crowne Plaza Riyadh Palace =

Hotel in Riyadh, Saudi Arabia

- كراون بلازا قصر الرياض
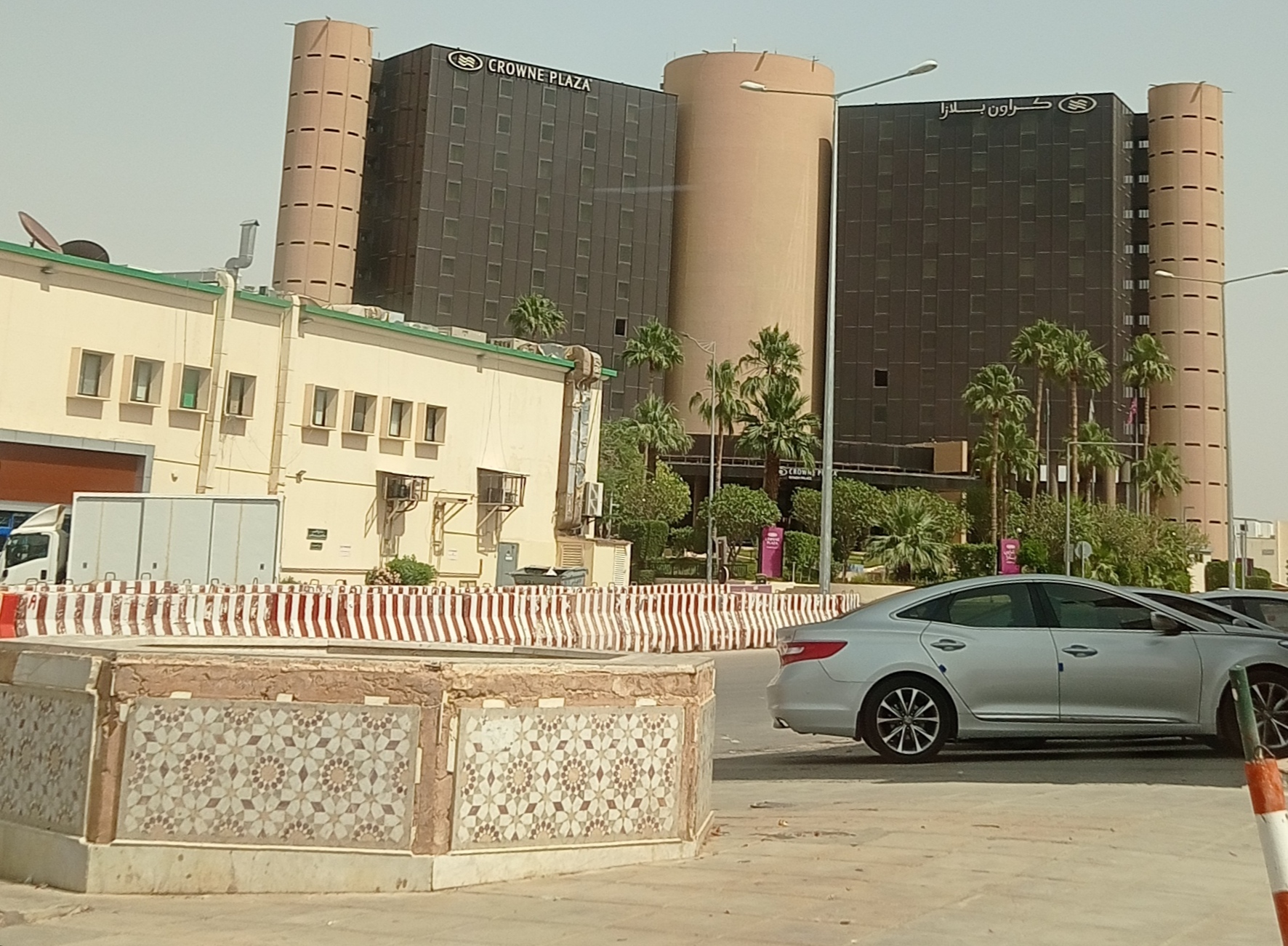
- Crowne Plaza Riyadh Palace, 2023
- Interactive map of the Crowne Plaza Riyadh Palace area
- Former names: Riyadh Palace Hotel (1979–2018)
- Hotel chain: Crowne Plaza

General information
- Architectural style: French
- Location: Riyadh, Saudi Arabia, Prince Abdul Rahman Bin Abdul Aziz St., Al-Murabba, Riyadh 11461
- Coordinates: 24°39′52″N 46°42′41″E
- Opened: October 1979; 46 years ago
- Landlord: DUR Hospitality

Other information
- Number of rooms: 304
- Number of restaurants: 2

Crowne Plaza Riyadh Palace (Arabic: كراون بلازا قصر الرياض), formerly Riyadh Palace Hotel (Arabic: فندق قصر الرياض), is a five-star 11-floor hotel in the al-Murabba neighborhood of Riyadh, Saudi Arabia, located in close proximity to several government ministries. Opened in 1979, it incorporates some elements of modern architecture and assumed its current name when it was bought by InterContinental Hotels Group in 2018.

== Overview ==
Riyadh Palace Hotel was opened in October 1979 by Saudi Hotel Services Company during the reign of King Khalid bin Abdulaziz.

The hotel has 304 rooms in total, over 1400 square meters of meetings space, a business center, fitness center along with five meeting rooms, an outdoor pool, Club Lounge, and a spa.

The hotel has been a popular destination for hosting important functions and events attended or organized by community-based organizations, celebrities, government ministers and diplomatic missions, such as the 2018 celebration of the 91st anniversary of the founding of People's Liberation Army by the Chinese diplomatic mission in Saudi Arabia and the 2021 agreement signed by the Saudi Tourism Authority at the Arabian Travel Market.

In 2014, the InterContinental Hotels Group and Dur Hospitality signed a master franchise agreement for four hotels in Saudi Arabia. Dur Hospitality subsequently signed an agreement with the Arab Investment Company in 2015 to purchase all the 1400 shares owned by the latter in the Saudi Hotel Services Company, thereby increasing the Dur Hospitality's ownership in the Saudi Hotel Services Company from 50% to 70%. In 2016, Dur Hospitality signed a contract with the Saudi Hotel Services Company to operate the hotel for 20 years.

in February 2018, the InterContinental Hotels Group signed a deal with Dur Hospitality to take over Riyadh Palace Hotel. In June 2018, the hotel was bought by InterContinental Hotels Group and was rebranded as Crowne Plaza Riyadh Palace.

== See also ==
- Khaldia Towers
