= Salam Park =

Urban park in Riyadh

- منتزة سلام
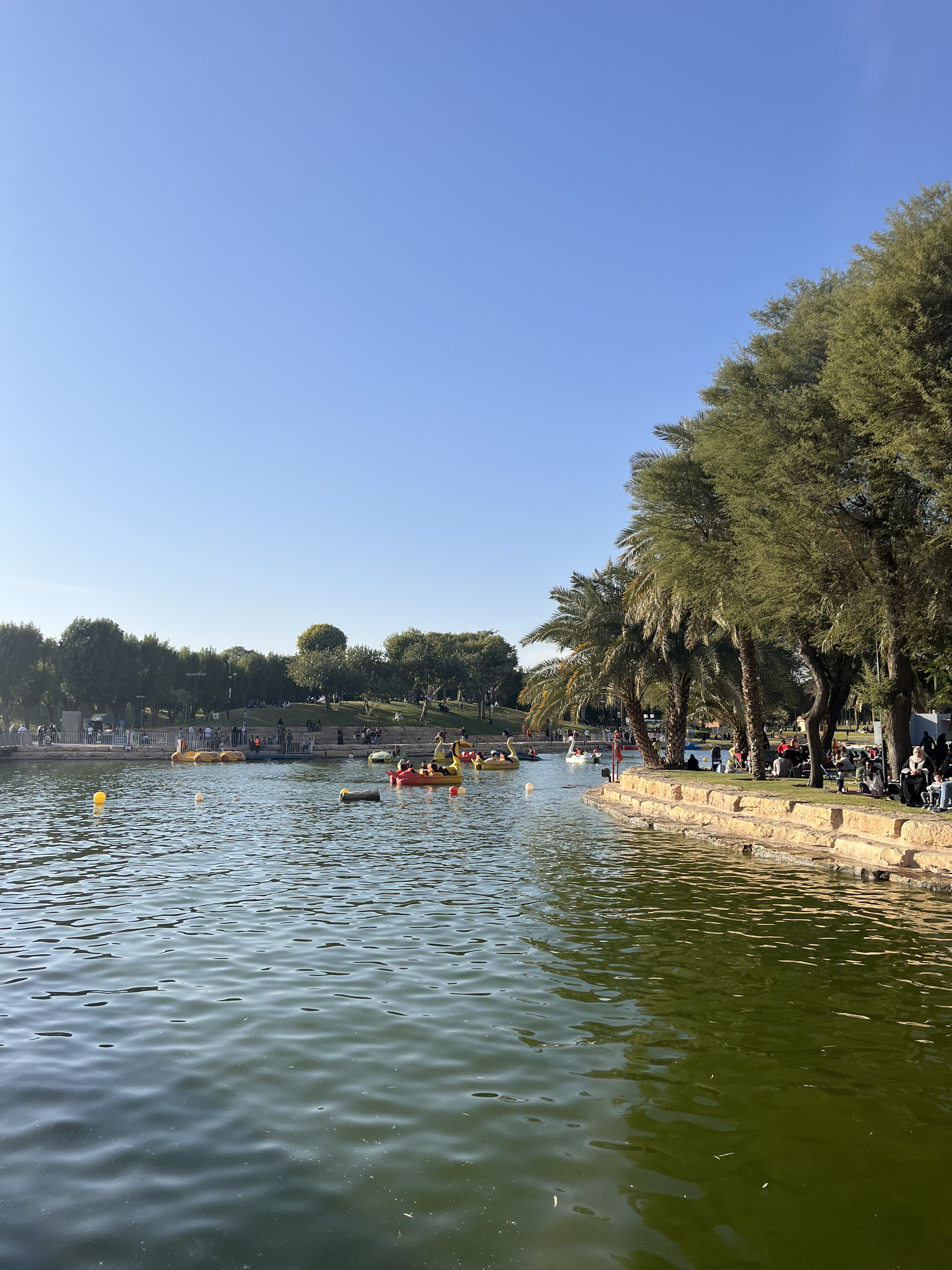
- Salam Park, 2026
- Interactive map of Salam Park
- Type: Urban
- Location: As-Salam, Riyadh, Saudi Arabia
- Coordinates: 24°37′15″N 46°42′30″E
- Area: 24.8 hectares (61 acres)
- Founder: Prince Salman bin Abdulaziz
- Designer: Omrania and Associates; Aukett Fitzroy Robinson
- Manager: Royal Commission for Riyadh City

Salam Park (Arabic: منتزة سلام, romanized: muntazah Salām, lit. 'peace park') is a 61-acre historic urban park in the al-Salam district of Riyadh, Saudi Arabia, located southwest of Qasr al-Hukm District. Opened in 2004, it was built on the site of an eponymous date palm orchard that belonged to Prince Abdullah bin Abdul Rahman. The park is popular for its 3.3 hectares large artificial lake and 1-kilometer long pedestrian track. It was jointly designed by Omrania and Associates and Aukett Fitzroy Robinson. The Salam Mosque, one of the oldest and earliest reinforced concrete mosques of Riyadh, is situated at the center of the park.

== Overview ==
In the 1990s, the Royal Commission for Riyadh City acquired the date palm orchard, known as Salam, that belonged to Prince Abdullah bin Abdul Rahman. The park was inaugurated in 2004 by Prince Salman bin Abdulaziz, who supervised the project and is today considered among the most popular places for recreation in the country's capital.

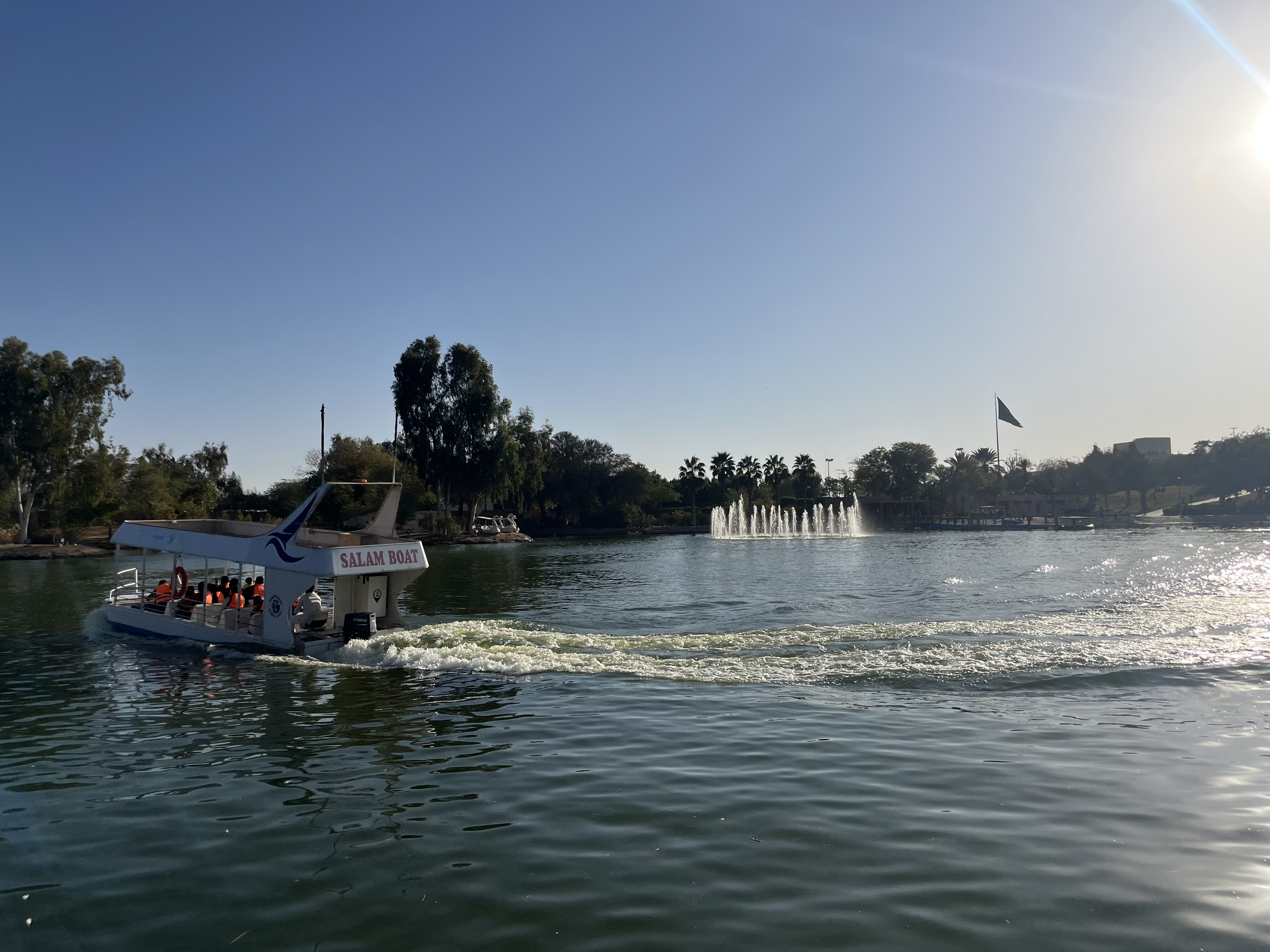
Shuttle boat in Salam Park in Riyadh, 2026

The park is divided into four sections, the Palm Grove, the Lake, the Hillside Zone and the Ecological Zone with the areas being accessible through the park's three main entrances; al-Marsa Gate, al-Bahirah Gate and al-Sahah Gate.
