= Ein Heet Cave =

Ein Heet Cave كهف عين هيت
- Location within Saudi Arabia
- Coordinates: 24.4861°N 46.9972°E
- Country: Saudi Arabia
- Time zone: UTC+3

Ein Heet Cave is a natural cave which is located 30 kilometers southeast of Riyadh city, near Alkharj, Saudi Arabia.

== Description ==
Ein Heet is a solutional cave that is famous for its limestone formations, and natural water reservoir. It is located in Al-Jubail Mountain, about 40 kilometers from Riyadh in the Kingdom of Saudi Arabia. It is a known tourist site, and one of Saudi Arabia's caves with easy access. Inside the cave, there is an underground lake in internal circled holes of more than 30 meters deep and 150 meters long. In the past, the water level was high, and the convoys were supplying water from it. However, the water level has declined in recent times.

The cave consists of numerous sinkholes (land subsidence). These sinkholes serve as an entrance to a large groundwater reservoir that is situated under the surface at great depth. It is the site of a star pin dating back thousands of years. The cave is distinguished by the coldness of water and atmosphere due to its limestone nature.

Ein Heet is a known sources of minerals such as anhydrite. In 1938, geologists discovered the first anhydrite rocks in the kingdom when King Abdulaziz Al-Saud invited them to survey the cave.

In recent years, several experienced cave explorers visited Ein Heet cave with their heavy equipment. They reached the edge of a lake which is situated at a distance of 120 meters under the surface. By using scubas, they discovered waterways of this ravine or cave. According to their points of views, this cave has pure water and it is the most pure water in the world.

== Ein Heet ==
It is an underground spring, about 390 meters deep. Its natural water runs throughout the year. Moreover, the Swedish brothers Lars and Erik Bjurstrom began to study the site by diving into the spring depths, and tracking waterholes.
