= Al Olaya (Riyadh) =

Commercial district in Riyadh, Saudi Arabia

Al-Olaya العليا حي
- Central Business District/Financial District and Neighbourhood
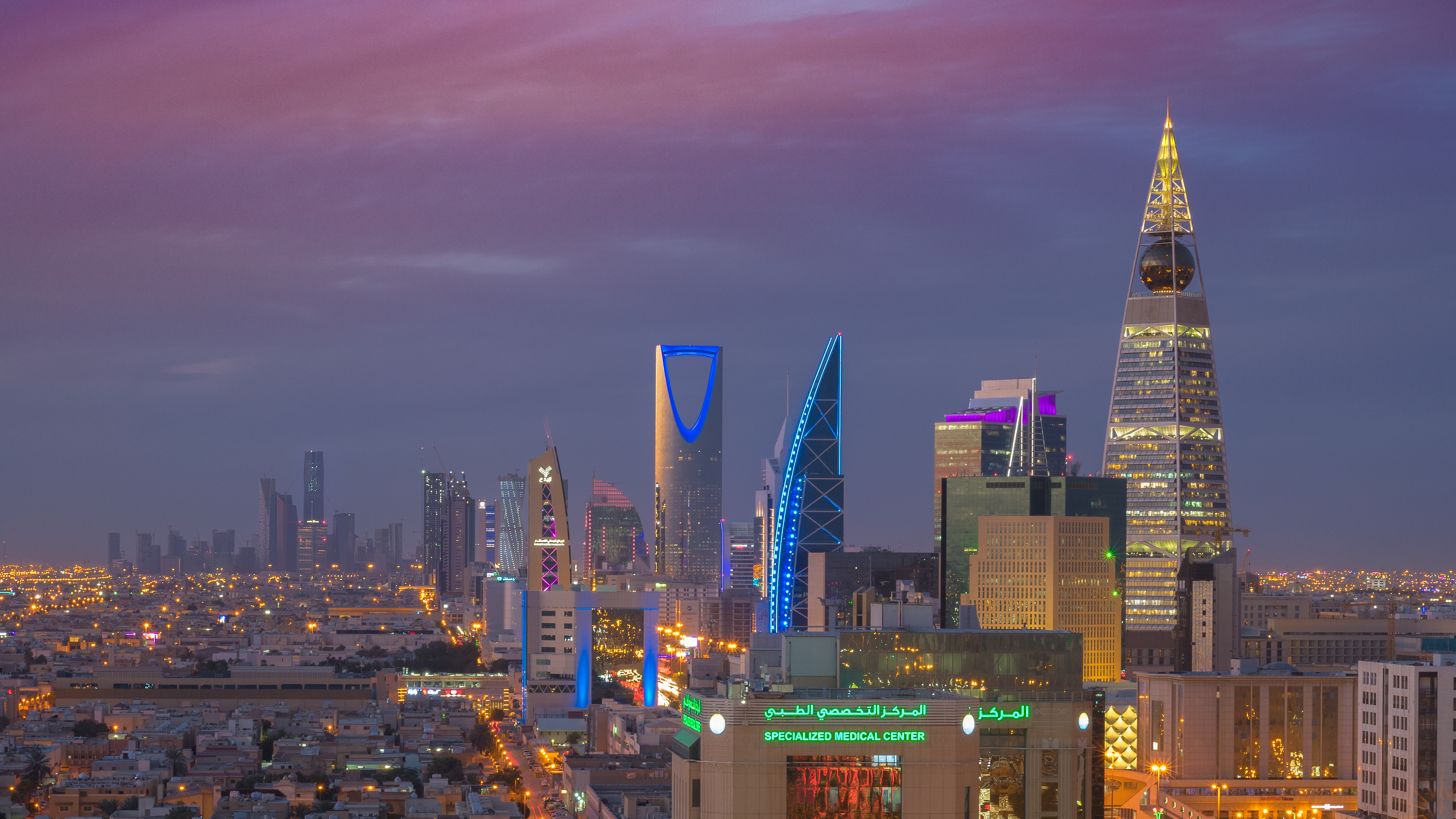

- Location within Saudi Arabia
- Coordinates: 24.69567°N 46.68112°E
- Country: Saudi Arabia
- City: Riyadh

Government
  - Body: Baladiyah al-Ulaya Baladiyah al-Ma'dher Baladiyah al-Malaz

Language
  - Official: Arabic

Al-Olaya (Arabic: العليا, romanized: al-ʿulāyā), alternatively transliterated as al-Ulaya, is the central business district of Riyadh, Saudi Arabia, located mostly in the sub-municipality of its namesake, al-Ulaya, and partially in al-Malaz and al-Ma'dher. Situated on the north side of the city, it hosts sites and local landmarks, such as the Kingdom Centre, which houses the Four Seasons luxury hotel.

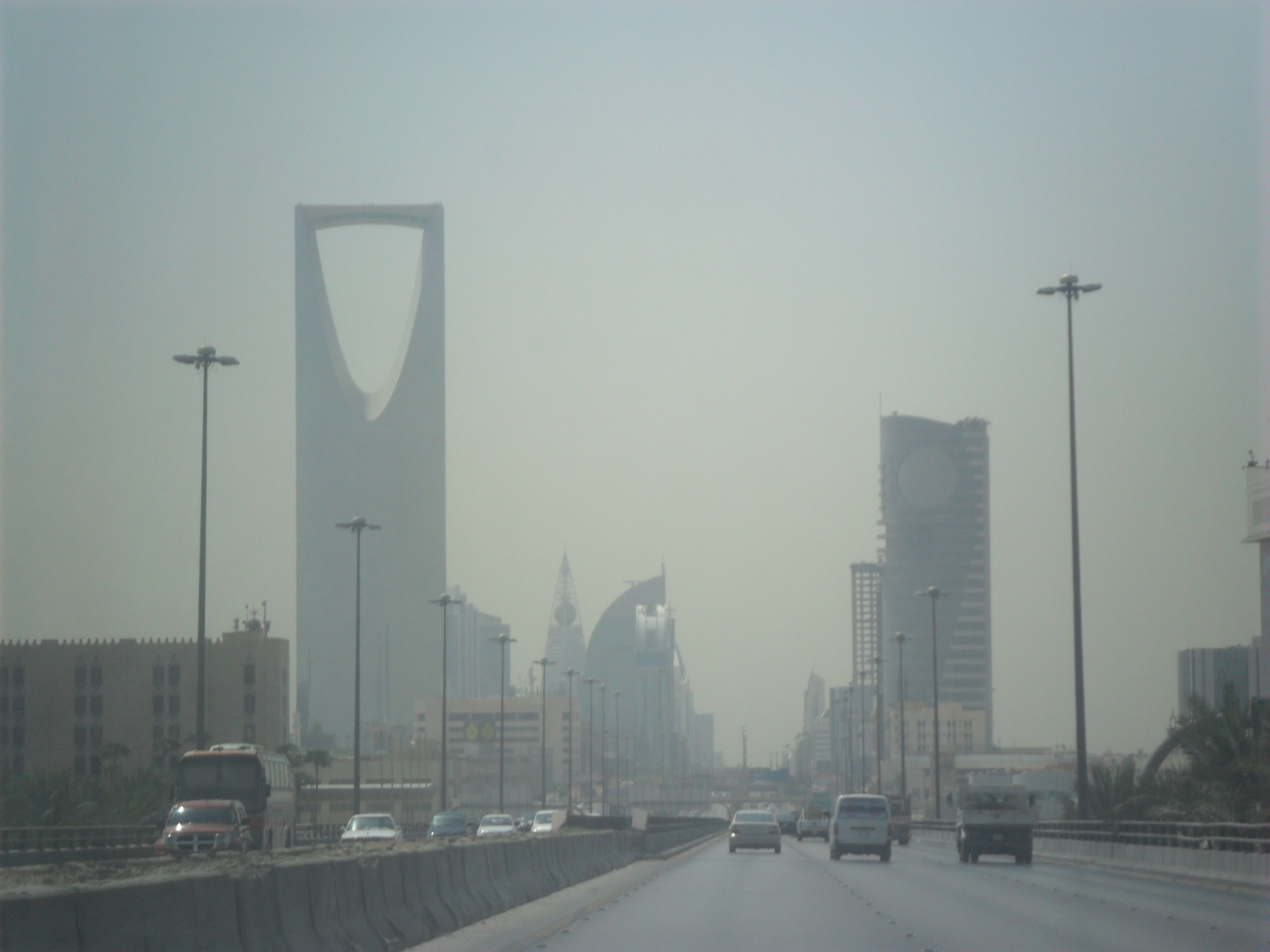
King Fahd Road, Olaya District

== In popular culture ==
The neighborhood was featured in the 2022 Saudi Arabian action thriller film Route 10.
