= Laysen Valley =

Mixed-use development in Riyadh, Saudi Arabia

- Laysen Valley, 2025
- Native name: ليسن فالي
- Industry: Office space provider Business park
- Founded: 2021
- Headquarters: Riyadh, Saudi Arabia
- Website: laysenvalley.sa

Laysen Valley (Arabic: ليسن فالي) is a mixed-use development in the Umm al-Hammam al-Gharbi neighborhood of Riyadh, Saudi Arabia. It was developed by Tatweer Holdings and became mostly operational by 2022. Covering an area of 74000 square meters, it is named after Wadi Laysan and contains several outlets of multinational chains of restaurants and cafeterias besides hosting offices of more than 50 multinational firms in five commercial buildings, including Servcorp, Roche, Credit Suisse, BlackRock and Nokia.

== Overview ==
Offices of Servcorp and BlackRock, 2024

Laysen Valley became mostly operational by 2022 and was developed by Tatweer Holdings. It was built on the six core principles of Salmani style, a distinct type of urban Najdi architectural method developed in Riyadh Province during the reign of Prince Salman bin Abdulaziz as the region's governor between 1963 and 2011. It hosts offices of more than 50 multinational firms. It is named after Wadi Laysan.

The construction of Laysen Valley began around 2020. In March 2021, Jadwa REIT Al Haramain and Jadwa REIT Saudi disclosed the details of investment following its acquisition of seven towers of Laysen Valley. In December 2021, Hilton announced setting up a hotel, in partnership with Mashareq. In January 2022, Swiss pharmaceutical company Norvatis announced that it would have its regional head office in Laysen Valley. Riyadh Municipality signed a benefit exchange agreement with Laysen Valley in March 2022.
