= Nasiriyah Gate =

- بوابة الناصرية
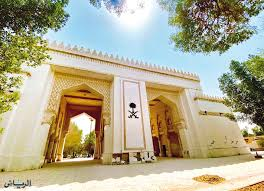

General information
- Architectural style: Islamic, modern
- Location: Riyadh, Saudi Arabia
- Coordinates: 24.64748°N 46.69052°E
- Completed: 1950s
- Grounds: 20.7 acres

Nasiriyah Gate (Arabic: بوابة الناصرية) is a historic arch-monument in the al-Nassiriyah neighborhood of Riyadh, Saudi Arabia. Built in the 1950s, the gate served as the eastern entrance to the al-Nassiriyah Palace complex. It covers an area of 20.7 acres and incorporates some elements of Islamic and modernist architecture.

The monument was built in the 1950s as part of the construction of al-Nassiriyah Palace complex during the reign of King Saud bin Abdulaziz. With much of the original palace structure being demolished by 1967, the gateway survived and was later restored in the 1970s by the Riyadh Municipality.

The monument is today situated nearby the King Saud Square, opposite to the headquarters of Ministry of Foreign Affairs at the intersection of Prince Talal bin Abdulaziz Street and al-Nasiriyah Street.

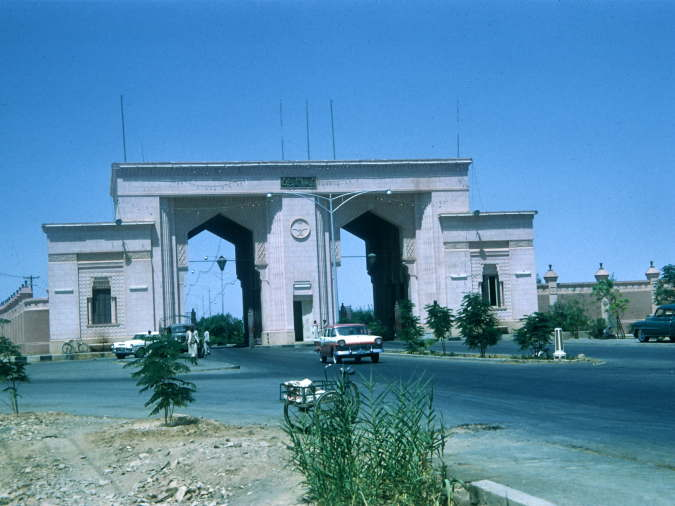
Nasiriyah Gate, 1960
