= List of tallest buildings in Saudi Arabia =

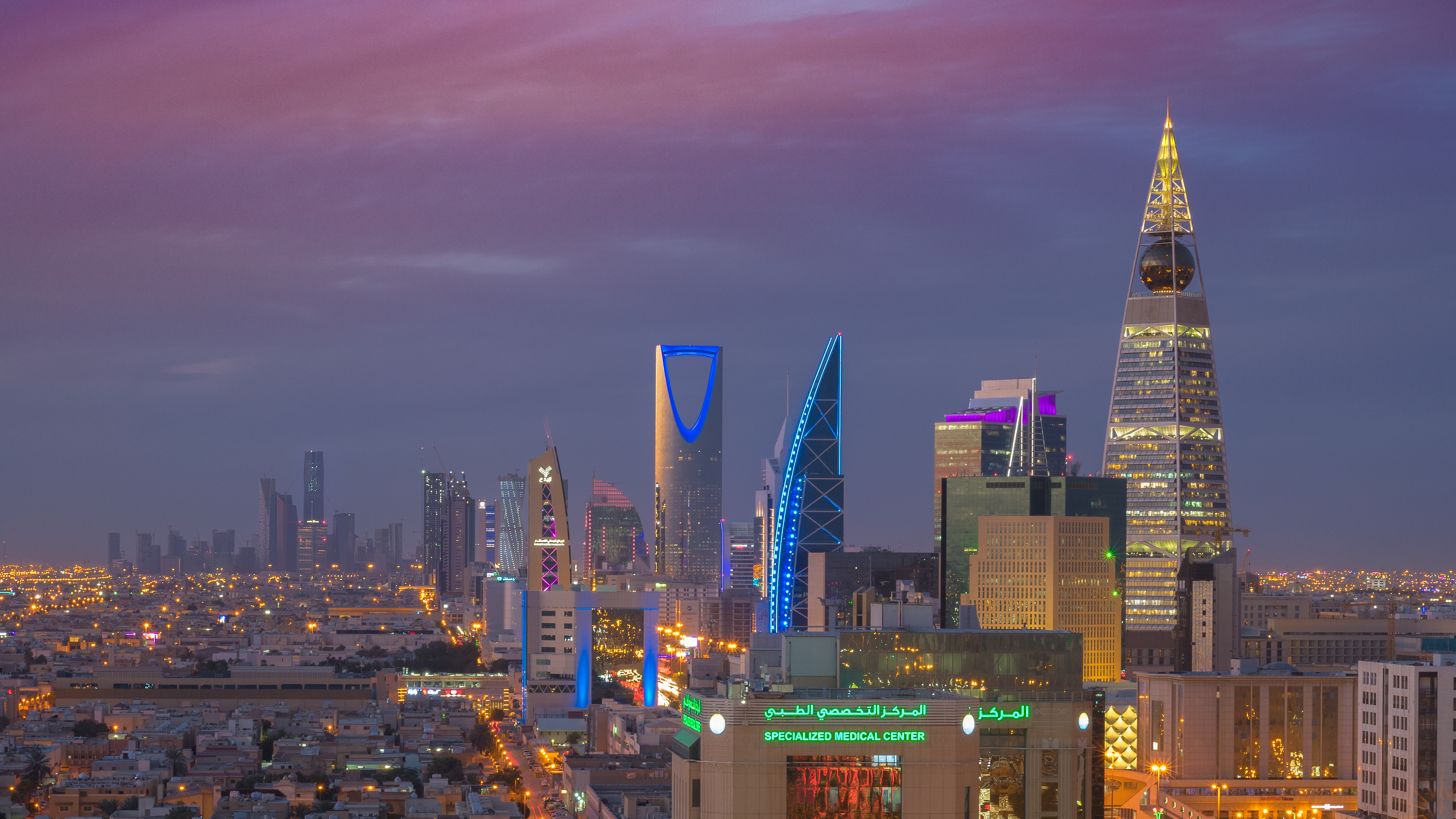
Riyadh skyline in February 2018

This list of tallest buildings in Saudi Arabia ranks the tallest buildings in Saudi Arabia by height.

The tallest building in the Kingdom of Saudi Arabia is the Makkah Royal Clock Tower in Mecca, which stands at a height of 601 m (1,972 ft). Completed in 2012, it is the fourth-tallest building in the world and serves as the centerpiece of The Clock Towers complex, also known as Abraj Al Bait. Over the past two decades, a high-rise construction boom has significantly reshaped the national skyline. The Public Investment Fund Tower, completed in 2021 with a height of 385 m (1,263 ft), is currently the tallest building in Riyadh. Consequently, Riyadh ranks as the fourth city in the Middle East to have a significant number of skyscrapers, following Dubai, Doha, and Abu Dhabi. Since 2014, a total of 100 skyscrapers have been constructed within the city.

== Tallest buildings ==
Was the tallest building in Saudi Arabia upon completion
Indicates buildings that have been topped out but not yet completed
Indicates non-habitable or partially habitable structures, such as freestanding towers or smokestacks, as well as buildings with masts or towers

This section lists completed and topped-out buildings in Saudi Arabia that reach a minimum height of 100 m (328 ft). Rankings are based on standard architectural height measurements, which include spires and architectural details but exclude antenna masts. An equal sign (=) following a rank indicates an identical height for two or more buildings. The "Year" column indicates the year in which a building was completed. Estimated heights are shown in italics.

| Rank | Name | Image | Location | Height m (ft) | Floors | Year | Notes |
|---|---|---|---|---|---|---|---|
| 1 | Makkah Royal Clock Tower | | Mecca; 21°25′08″N 39°49′35″E | 601 m (1,972 ft) | 120 | 2012 | 4th-tallest building in the world and tallest in Saudi Arabia; Tallest clock tower in the world. The centerpiece of The Clock Towers complex. |
| 2 | Public Investment Fund Tower | | Riyadh; 24.7628°N 46.6403°E | 385 m (1,263 ft) | 80 | 2021 | Tallest building in Riyadh and the headquarters of the Public Investment Fund.; Tallest office building in Saudi Arabia. |
| 3 | Sumou Tower 1 | | Jeddah; 21.5942°N 39.1069°E | 310 m (1,017 ft) | 72 | 2026 | Tallest building in Jeddah.; Formerly known as Lamar Tower 1. |
| 4 | Burj Rafal | | Riyadh; 24°47′32″N 46°37′56″E | 307.9 m (1,010 ft) | 68 | 2014 | Designed by P&T Group. |
| 5 | KAFD World Trade Center | | Riyadh; 24.7630°N 46.6406°E | 304 m (997 ft) | 67 | 2022 | Also known as PPA 30 Parcel 1.15. |
| 6 | Kingdom Centre | | Riyadh; 24.7113°N 46.6744°E | 302.3 m (992 ft) | 99 | 2002 | Tallest building in Saudi Arabia from 2002 to 2012. Formerly known as Kingdom Tower. |
| 7 | Sumou Tower 2 | | Jeddah; 21.5942°N 39.1069°E | 290 m (951 ft) | 63 | 2026 | Formerly known as Lamar Tower 2. |
| 8 | Abraj Al Bait ZamZam Tower | | Mecca | 279 m (915 ft) | 58 | 2012 | Tallest hotel in Saudi Arabia. Part of The Clock Towers complex. |
| 9 | Abraj Al Bait Hajar Tower | | Mecca; 21°25′08″N 39°49′35″E | 276 m (906 ft) | 54 | 2012 | Part of The Clock Towers complex. |
| 10 | Al Faisaliah Tower | | Riyadh; 24°41′25″N 46°41′07″E | 266.9 m (876 ft) | 30 | 2000 | Tallest building in Saudi Arabia from 2000 to 2002. Designed by Foster + Partners. |
| 11 | Burj Assila/ Shangri-La Hotel & Residences Jeddah | | Jeddah; 21.62259°N 39.10803°E | 264.7 m (868 ft) | 65 | 2021 | Also known as Sail Tower. Designed by Perkins&Will. |
| 12 | Riyad Bank Tower | | Riyadh | 264 m (866 ft) | 53 | 2023 | Formerly known as GCC Bank Headquarters and Gulf Cooperation Council Bank. |
| 13 | Tamkeen Tower | | Riyadh; 24.8215°N 46.6198°E | 258.2 m (847 ft) | 58 | 2012 | Formerly known as ARIJ Tower. |
| 14 | Raffles Residences Jeddah | | Jeddah; 21.57556°N 39.11049°E | 251 m (823 ft) | 59 | 2025 | Tallest residential building in Saudi Arabia. Formerly known as Aqua Tower. |
| – | Jeddah TV Tower | | Jeddah; 21.4729°N 39.1996°E | 250 m (820 ft) | N/A | 2006 | Tallest television tower in Saudi Arabia. |
| 15 | Al Majdoul Tower | | Riyadh; 24.7391°N 46.6593°E | 244 m (801 ft) | 54 | 2019 | Tallest twisted building in Saudi Arabia and the 16th-tallest twisted building in the world. |
| 16 | The Headquarters Business Park Tower | | Jeddah; 21.6023°N 39.1093°E | 235.9 m (774 ft) | 55 | 2015 | Tallest office building in Jeddah. Designed by Batley Partners. |
| 17= | Abraj Al Bait Maqam Tower | | Mecca; 21°25′08″N 39°49′35″E | 232.4 m (762 ft) | 61 | 2012 | Tallest residential building in Mecca, sharing the same height as Abraj Al Bait Qibla Tower. Part of The Clock Towers complex. |
| 17= | Abraj Al Bait Qibla Tower | | Mecca; 21°25′08″N 39°49′35″E | 232.4 m (762 ft) | 61 | 2012 | Tallest residential building in Mecca, sharing the same height as Abraj Al Bait Maqam Tower. Part of The Clock Towers complex. |
| 18= | Abraj Al Bait Marwah Tower | | Mecca; 21°25′08″N 39°49′35″E | 232 m (761 ft) | 46 | 2008 | Part of The Clock Towers complex. |
| 18= | Abraj Al Bait Safa Tower | | Mecca; 21°25′08″N 39°49′35″E | 232 m (761 ft) | 46 | 2007 | Part of The Clock Towers complex. |
| 19 | SNB Head Office | | Riyadh | 231.2 m (759 ft) | 40 | 2020 | The headquarters of the Saudi National Bank. Also known as Samba Bank HQ Tower. |
| 20 | Sky Gardens by Rafal | | Riyadh | 213 m (699 ft) | 62 | 2022 | Also known as Rafal Living Tower. |
| 21= | Golden Tower | | Jeddah; 21.4729°N 39.1996°E | 205 m (673 ft) | 49 | 2018 | Designed by Nabil Gholam Architects. |
| 21= | Al Rajhi Bank Tower | | Riyadh; 24.75018°N 46.65369°E | 205 m (673 ft) | 36 | 2017 | Also known as Al Rajhi Bank Headquarters. Designed by SOM and RSP Architects Planners & Engineers. |
| 22 | Olaya Tower 1 | | Riyadh; 24.69687°N 46.68284°E | 203.4 m (667 ft) | 36 | 2013 | |
| 23= | Dhahran Tower | | Khobar; 26.33755°N 50.20041°E | 200 m (656 ft) | 46 | 2012 | Tallest building in Khobar. Also known as Suwaiket Tower. |
| 23= | Tadawul Tower | | Riyadh | 200 m (656 ft) | 43 | 2022 | Formerly known as Saudi Stock Exchange Headquarters. |
| 23= | Burj DAMAC | | Riyadh | 200 m (656 ft) | 36 | 2016 | Formerly known as Exclusiva One. |
| 23= | Al-Obeikan Hilton Tower Hotel | | Riyadh | 200 m (656 ft) | 35 | 2017 | Also known as Hilton Riyadh Olaya. |
| 23= | Al Nakheel Tower | | Riyadh | 200 m (656 ft) | 26 | 2011 | |
| 24 | Al Jawhara Tower | | Jeddah; 21.5778°N 39.1079°E | 187 m (614 ft) | 48 | 2014 | |
| 25 | Square Towers 1 | | Riyadh | 184 m (604 ft) | 48 | 2025 | Also known as Al Murraba Tower 1. |
| 26 | PPA 30 Parcel 4.09 | | Riyadh | 182 m (597 ft) | 46 | 2015 | |
| 27= | Jumeirah Jabal Omar Makkah; North Tower | | Mecca | 179 m (587 ft) | 40 | 2023 | |
| 27= | Jumeirah Jabal Omar Makkah; South Tower | | Mecca | 179 m (587 ft) | 40 | 2023 | |
| 28 | Beach Tower | | Jeddah; 21.64490°N 39.10349°E | 177 m (581 ft) | 36 | 2014 | |
| 29 | Square Towers 2 | | Riyadh | 176 m (577 ft) | 40 | 2025 | Also known as Al Murraba Tower 2. |
| 30 | Riyadh TV Tower | | Riyadh; 24.64331°N 46.69580°E | 175 m (574 ft) | 8 | 1982 | Tallest building in Saudi Arabia between 1982 and 2000. |
| 30 | King's Road Tower | | Jeddah; 21.55902°N 39.12485°E | 170 m (558 ft) | 37 | 2011 | |
| 31 | The Venue Jeddah Corniche | | Jeddah; 21.60183°N 39.10794°E | 169.6 m (556 ft) | 23 | 2000 | |
| 32 | Olaya Tower 2 | | Riyadh; 24.69687°N 46.68284°E | 166.3 m (546 ft) | 34 | 2013 | |
| 33 | ETLAL Residence | | Riyadh | 165 m (541 ft) | 40 | 2022 | Formerly known as Zamil Tower. |
| 34 | Al Waseel Tower | | Riyadh | 163.2 m (535 ft) | 21 | 2011 | |
| 35 | Hamad Tower | | Riyadh; 24.69191°N 46.68265°E | 163 m (535 ft) | 39 | 2016 | Designed by Abdulelah Al Mohanna Engineering Consultants. Widely misreported as 200 m (656 ft). |
| 36 | Aramco Tower | | Riyadh; 24.76799°N 46.64169°E | 160 m (525 ft) | 32 | 2016 | Also known as Villas in the Sky. |
| 37 | Muqarnas Tower | | Riyadh | 158 m (518 ft) | 36 | 2016 | |
| 38= | Boudl Tower | | Riyadh; 24.69564°N 46.68359°E | 155 m (509 ft) | 26 | 2017 | Also known as Boudl-Narcissus Classic Tower. |
| 38= | Burj Al Anoud 1 | | Riyadh; 24.70684°N 46.67550°E | 155 m (509 ft) | 20 | 2005 | |
| 38= | Burj Al Anoud 2 | | Riyadh | 155 m (509 ft) | 20 | 2012 | |
| 39= | Bayat Plaza Tower 1 | | Jeddah | 151 m (495 ft) | 34 | 2018 | |
| 39= | Al Swailem Tower | | Riyadh | 151 m (495 ft) | 28 | 2017 | Also known as Hyatt Regency Hotel Riyadh. |
| 40= | Fairmont Ramla Serviced Residences | | Riyadh | 150 m (492 ft) | 37 | 2023 | Also known as Burj Ramla. |
| 40= | AKH Tower | | Dammam | 150 m (492 ft) | 37 | 2018 | Tallest building in Dammam. Also known as AbdulKarim Tower. |
| 40= | Jabal Omar Residential Tower 1 | | Mecca | 150 m (492 ft) | 35 | 2014 | |
| 40= | Jabal Omar Residential Tower 2 | | Mecca | 150 m (492 ft) | 35 | 2014 | |
| 40= | Jabal Omar Residential Tower 3 | | Mecca | 150 m (492 ft) | 35 | 2014 | |
| 40= | Jabal Omar Residential Tower 4 | | Mecca | 150 m (492 ft) | 35 | 2014 | |
| 40= | Jabal Omar Residential Tower 5 | | Mecca | 150 m (492 ft) | 35 | 2014 | |
| 40= | Jabal Omar Residential Tower 6 | | Mecca | 150 m (492 ft) | 35 | 2014 | |
| 40= | DAMAC Esclusiva Luxury Serviced Apartments | | Riyadh | 150 m (492 ft) | 30 | 2016 | |
| 40= | Taif Heart Tower | | Taif | 150 m (492 ft) | 30 | 2008 | Tallest building in Taif. |
| 41 | PPA 30 Parcel 5.05 Residential Tower | | Riyadh | 149 m (489 ft) | 38 | 2023 | |
| 42 | PP 10 Parcel 3.04 Office Tower | | Riyadh | 144.6 m (474 ft) | 34 | 2014 | |
| 43 | Masarat Tower | | Jeddah | 144 m (472 ft) | 42 | 2013 | |
| 44 | Al Hugayet Tower | | Khobar; 26.30851°N 50.20999°E | 140 m (459 ft) | 26 | 2011 | |
| 45= | PPA 30 Parcel 3.09 | | Riyadh | 138 m (453 ft) | 33 | 2017 | |
| 45= | Waterfall Tower | | Riyadh | 138 m (453 ft) | 30 | 2024 | Also known as PPA 30 Parcel 3.10. |
| 46 | Four Points by Sheraton Riyadh Khaldia | | Riyadh | 137 m (449 ft) | 33 | 1983 | |
| 47= | Al Khobar Gate Tower | | Khobar; 26.30798°N 50.21144°E | 135 m (443 ft) | 35 | 2012 | |
| 47= | Saudi British Bank Tower | | Riyadh | 135 m (443 ft) | 30 | 2021 | |
| 47= | Crystal Tower 1 | | Riyadh | 135 m (443 ft) | 26 | 2022 | Also known as PPA 30 Parcel 1.10. |
| 48= | Jeddah Light Tower | | Jeddah | 133 m (436 ft) | 7 | 1990 | |
| 48= | Moon Tower | | Riyadh | 133 m (436 ft) | 27 | 2013 | |
| 49 | Elegance Medical Tower | | Riyadh | 130 m (427 ft) | 27 | 2016 | Tallest hospital in Saudi Arabia. |
| 50= | PP 10 Parcel 4.08 | | Riyadh | 126 m (413 ft) | 32 | 2020 | |
| 50= | National Commercial Bank | | Jeddah | 126 m (413 ft) | 27 | 1983 | Designed by SOM. |
| 51 | PPA 30 Parcel 5.05 Office Tower | | Riyadh | 125 m (410 ft) | 23 | 2023 | |
| 52= | Farsi Seven Tower 1 | | Jeddah | 123 m (404 ft) | 36 | 2017 | |
| 52= | Farsi Seven Tower 2 | | Jeddah | 123 m (404 ft) | 36 | 2017 | |
| 52= | Ajdan Rise | | Khobar | 123 m (404 ft) | 36 | 2021 | |
| 53 | Al Nakhlah Tower | | Riyadh | 122 m (400 ft) | 27 | 2016 | Formerly known as MIG Tower. |
| 54= | Al Munajem Tower | | Riyadh | 110 m (361 ft) | 26 | 2011 | |
| 54= | King Abdulaziz Center for World Culture | | Dhahran; 26.33541°N 50.12095°E | 110 m (361 ft) | 18 | 2018 | Tallest building in Dhahran. |
| 55= | Raffles Jeddah | | Jeddah | 107 m (351 ft) | 28 | 2025 | |
| 55= | Islamic Development Bank Headquarters | | Jeddah | 107 m (351 ft) | 22 | 1993 | |
| 56 | The Oval | | Riyadh | 105.3 m (345 ft) | 26 | 2024 | |
| 58= | Al-Malika Commercial Complex | | Jeddah | 105 m (344 ft) | 27 | 1973 | |
| 58= | PPA 30 Parcel 5.03 Tower 1 | | Riyadh | 105 m (344 ft) | 26 | 2021 | |
| 59 | PP 10 Parcel 2.14 | | Riyadh | 104.9 m (344 ft) | 19 | 2021 | |
| 60 | Corniche Dreams | | Jeddah | 103 m (338 ft) | 30 | 2017 | |
| 61 | PP 10 Parcel 1.12 | | Riyadh | 102.1 m (335 ft) | 21 | 2023 | |
| 62 | Spimaco Addwaeih Tower | | Riyadh | 101 m (331 ft) | 23 | 2023 | |
| 63= | NCCI Towers North | | Riyadh | 100.6 m (330 ft) | 21 | 1999 | |
| 63= | NCCI Towers South | | Riyadh | 100.6 m (330 ft) | 21 | 1999 | |
| 64 | HDB Financial Hotel Riyadh | | Riyadh | 100 m (328 ft) | 26 | 2022 | |

== Under construction ==
Building currently under construction
Building stopped construction

This section lists buildings under construction in Saudi Arabia that are planned to reach a minimum height of 100 m (328 ft).

| Rank | Name | City | Height m (ft) | Floors | Planned Completion | Notes |
|---|---|---|---|---|---|---|
| 1 | Jeddah Tower | Jeddah | 1,000+ m (3,281+ ft) | 167 | 2028 | Set to become the world's tallest building and structure upon its completion. Construction began in 2013 but was halted in early 2018 due to financial and labor challenges involving the Saudi Binladen Group following the 2017–2019 Saudi Arabian purge. Official construction formally resumed in early 2025, with a projected completion date in 2028. |
| 2 | The Line | Neom | 500 m (1,640 ft) | – | 2045 | Originally conceived as a 170-kilometer linear city, the project was later scaled back to a 2.4-kilometer initial phase. The design comprises two parallel mirrored skyscrapers standing 500 meters (1,640 ft) tall, intended to accommodate 9 million residents without the use of cars, streets, or carbon emissions. Construction was officially placed on hold in late 2025. |
| 3 | Burj Almasa | Jeddah | 432 m (1,417 ft) | 93 | – | Formerly known as Diamond Tower. Deeply on hold since September 2023. |
| 4 | Mukaab | Riyadh | 400 m (1,312 ft) | 70 | 2040 | Upon completion, the structure is projected to become the world's largest building by floor area, with a total capacity equivalent to twenty Empire State Buildings. Construction was officially suspended in early 2026 to facilitate a comprehensive re-evaluation of the project's financial feasibility and overall scale. |
| 5 | Tuwaiq Heritage Tower | Riyadh | 305 m (1,001 ft) | 51 | 2027 | Will become the world's tallest heritage building upon completion. Also known as Tuwaiq Traditional Tower and MAZZI Tower. |
| 6 | U-View Tower | Jeddah | 263 m (863 ft) | 52 | 2030 | Designed by KEO International Consultants. Planned to feature luxury residential units, serviced apartments, and a 5-star luxury hotel. |
| 7 | Abraj Kudai | Mecca | 230 m (755 ft) | 45 | – | If completed, it would become the world's largest hotel, featuring 10,000 rooms and 70 restaurants. Originally projected to open in 2017, construction was suspended in 2015 due to financial constraints and regional economic shifts. As of 2026, the project remains on hold, and its future completion remains uncertain. |
| 8 | Alinma Bank Tower | Riyadh | 213 m (699 ft) | 42 | 2027 | Will serve as the new permanent headquarters of Alinma Bank. |
| 9 | Trump Tower Jeddah | Jeddah | 189 m (620 ft) | 47 | 2029 | Developed by Dar Global and The Trump Organization. |
| 10 | The Avenues T3 | Riyadh | 180 m (591 ft) | 38 | 2026 | Also known as The Avenues Branded Residence + Boutique Hotel Tower. Will become the part of The Avenues complex. |
| 11 | The Avenues Conrad Hotel | Riyadh | 178 m (584 ft) | 34 | 2026 | Also known as The Avenues T5. Will become the part of The Avenues complex. |
| 12 | The Avenues T1 | Riyadh | 175 m (574 ft) | 35 | 2026 | Will become the part of The Avenues complex. |
| 13 | The Avenues Waldorf Astoria Hotel | Riyadh | 173 m (568 ft) | 31 | 2026 | Also known as The Avenues T2. Will become the part of The Avenues complex. |
| 14 | Canopy Tower | Riyadh | 160 m (525 ft) | 31 | 2026 | Also known as The Avenues T4. Will become the part of The Avenues complex. |
| 15 | The Curves Residence | Riyadh | 109 m (358 ft) | 27 | 2026 | |

== Proposed ==
This section lists proposed buildings in Saudi Arabia that are planned to reach a minimum height of 100 m (328 ft).

| Name | City | Height m (ft) | Floors | Notes |
|---|---|---|---|---|
| Rise Tower | Riyadh | 2,000 m (6,562 ft) | 678 | Designed by Foster + Partners as the centerpiece of the North Pole development. If built, it would become the world's tallest building, doubling the height of the Burj Khalifa and surpassing the Jeddah Tower. As of March 2026, the project remains in the competition and bidding phase, and no formal groundbreaking date has been announced. |
| Neom Wind Tower | Neom | 1,000 m (3,281 ft) | – | |
| The Blade | Riyadh | 610 m (2,001 ft) | 128 | Considered a stale proposal. |
| King Salman Gate | Mecca | 600+ m (1,969+ ft) | 100+ | Planned to become the tallest building within the King Salman Gate project. |
| Jewel of Saudia | Riyadh | 600 m (1,969 ft) | 99 | |
| Icon Tower | Jeddah | 535 m (1,755 ft) | 90 | Considered a stale proposal. |
| Tower A | Riyadh | 500 m (1,640 ft) | 90 | |
| Dubai Towers 1 | Jeddah | 448 m (1,470 ft) | 87 | Considered a stale proposal. |
| Mecca Secretariat Tower | Mecca | 400+ m (1,312+ ft) | 100 | |
| Riyadh Tower | Riyadh | 389 m (1,276 ft) | 97 | Considered a stale proposal. |
| Ajyad Residences Tower | Mecca | 365 m (1,198 ft) | 84 | |
| Fawaz Alhokair Tower | Riyadh | 354 m (1,161 ft) | 81 | |
| Balcony Tower 1 | Riyadh | 350 m (1,150 ft) | 67 | |
| Discovery Tower | Neom | 330 m (1,083 ft) | – | Designed by Zaha Hadid Architects for the Trojena ski resort. This skyscraper is planned for a mountain site overlooking a central artificial lake. The structure is intended to feature observation decks, restaurants, high-end retail, and tech-driven artistic experiences. |
| Dubai Towers 2 | Jeddah | 308 m (1,010 ft) | 60 | Considered a stale proposal. |
| Rawabi Abraj Al Bait | Mecca | 300 m (984 ft) | 66 | |
| Epicon Tower 1 | Neom | 275 m (902 ft) | – | |
| Masic Corniche Tower | Jeddah | 245 m (804 ft) | 55 | Currently on hold. |
| Riyadh Tower (Spectrum Proposal) | Riyadh | 235 m (771 ft) | 59 | |
| Balcony Tower 2 | Riyadh | 230 m (755 ft) | 50 | |
| Epicon Tower 2 | Neom | 225 m (738 ft) | – | |
| Riyadh Commercial Tower | Riyadh | 220 m (722 ft) | 42 | |
| Jeddah Chamber of Commerce and Industry Expansion | Jeddah | 190 m (623 ft) | 38 | |
| Balcony Tower 3 | Riyadh | 184 m (604 ft) | 40 | |
| Modern Investment Company Tower | Jeddah | 171 m (561 ft) | 27 | |
| Organization of the Islamic World Tower | Jeddah | 162 m (531 ft) | 29 | |

== Unbuilt ==
This section lists buildings in Saudi Arabia that were cancelled, scrapped, or rejected after having been planned to reach a minimum height of 100 m (328 ft).

| Name | City | Height m (ft) | Floors | Notes |
|---|---|---|---|---|
| Mile High Tower | Jeddah | 1,600 m (5,249 ft) | 330 | Replaced by Jeddah Tower. |
| Al Mada Tower 1 | Jeddah | 358 m (1,175 ft) | 86 | Cancelled |
| Al Mada Tower 2 | Jeddah | 358 m (1,175 ft) | 86 | Cancelled |
| Al Rajhi Tower | Riyadh | 352 m (1,155 ft) | 50 | Now built as Al Rajhi Bank Tower. |
| Riyadh Tower (Nikken Sekkei's Proposal) | Riyadh | 338 m (1,109 ft) | 73 | Initially approved, but the project was eventually cancelled. |
| Al Oula Tower | Khobar | 300 m (984 ft) | 60 | Cancelled |
| Grand Hyatt Jeddah | Jeddah | 234 m (768 ft) | 48 | Initially approved, but the project was eventually cancelled. |
| Bayat Plaza Tower 3 | Jeddah | 215 m (705 ft) | 48 | Cancelled |
| Commendatore Tower | Jeddah | 190 m (623 ft) | 48 | Replaced by Trump Tower Jeddah. |
| Samba Bank Tower | Riyadh | 165 m (541 ft) | 37 | Now built as SNB Head Office. |

== Horizontal skyscraper ==
Saudi Arabia crown prince Mohammed bin Salman announced that the state will be building a long horizontal skyscraper. Being officially presented under the name of The Line, the complex will be a linear smart city placed in Neom, Tabuk Province, which is designed to have no cars, streets or carbon emissions.

== See also ==
- List of tallest hotels
- List of tallest buildings
- List of tallest buildings in Asia
- List of tallest residential buildings
- List of tallest structures by country
- List of tallest structures in the Middle East
