= Dhahran Tower =

Residential skyscraper in Khobar, Saudi Arabia

- برج الظهران
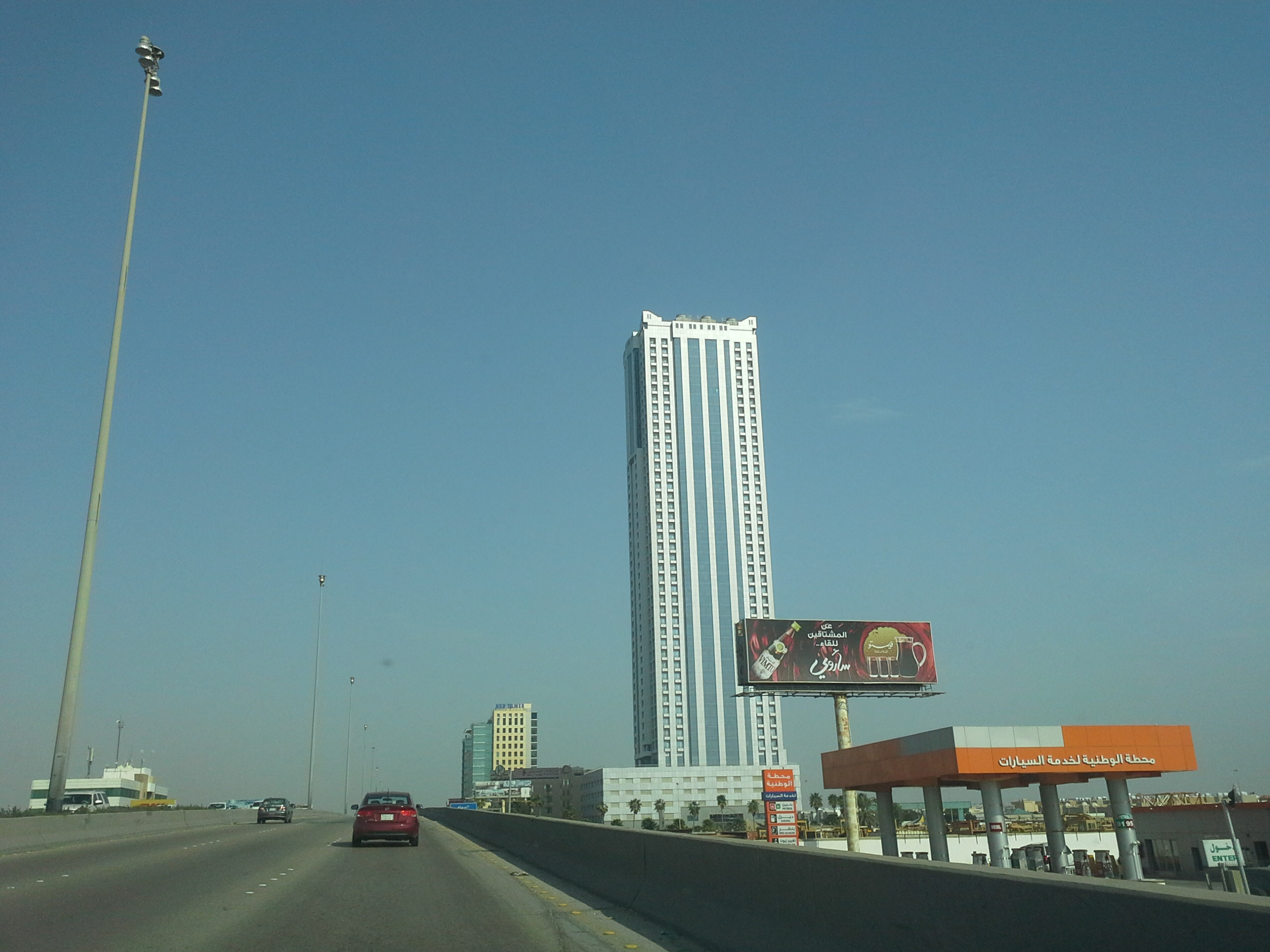
- Dhahran Tower in February 2014

General information
- Status: Completed
- Type: Residential
- Location: King Fahd Road & Prince Sultan Road, Khobar, Saudi Arabia
- Coordinates: 26°20′15.3″N 50°12′01.5″E
- Construction started: 2007
- Completed: 2012
- Cost: SAR 350,000,000
- Owner: Mubarak Al Suwaiket

Height
- Roof: 200 m (656 ft)

Technical details
- Floor count: 46
- Lifts/elevators: 5

Design and construction
- Developer: Al Suwaiket Group

Website
- https://dhtower.com/

The Dhahran Tower, also known as the Suwaiket Tower, is a 46-story residential skyscraper in Khobar, Saudi Arabia. Standing at a height of 200 m (656 ft), it is the tallest building in Khobar, the tallest building in the Eastern Province, and the tallest building in Saudi Arabia outside of Riyadh, Jeddah, and Mecca. The building offers furnished apartments and a variety of amenities, including a swimming pool, a gym, and a recreational room.

The skyscraper is owned by Saudi Arabian businessman Mubarak Al Suwaiket and officially opened on June 7, 2012, following a construction cost of 350 million Saudi riyals.

== Apartments ==
The skyscraper offers 291 apartments consisting of the following options:

- A 158-square-meter furnished two-bedroom apartment
- A 192-square-meter furnished two-bedroom apartment
- A 231-square-meter furnished three-bedroom apartment
- A 255-square-meter furnished three-bedroom apartment

== See also ==
- List of tallest buildings in Saudi Arabia
- List of the tallest structures in Saudi Arabia
