= Jeddah TV Tower =

Telecommunications tower in Jeddah, Saudi Arabia

- برج تلفزيون جدة

General information
- Status: Completed
- Type: Television Tower
- Location: Jeddah, Saudi Arabia
- Coordinates: 21°28′23″N 39°11′59″E
- Completed: 2006
- Owner: Saudi Broadcasting Authority

Height
- Height: 250 m (820 ft)

The Jeddah TV Tower (Arabic: برج تلفزيون جدة) is a 250-metre-high (820 ft) television tower located in Jeddah, Saudi Arabia. Completed in 2006, the tower serves broadcasting purposes and includes an observation deck.

== See also ==
- Radio masts and towers
- Saudi Broadcasting Authority
- List of tallest buildings in Saudi Arabia
- List of the tallest structures in Saudi Arabia
