= KAFD World Trade Center =

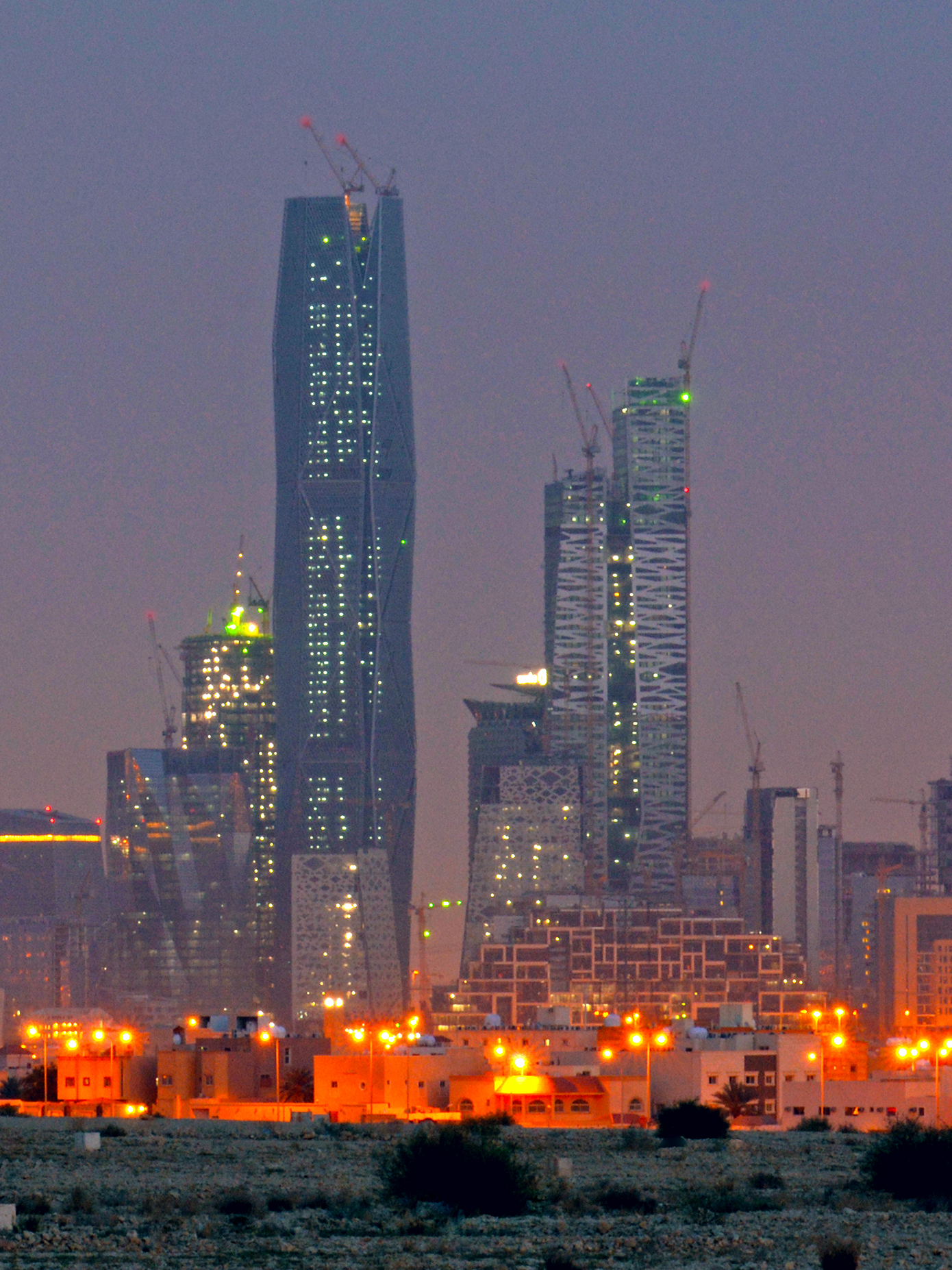
- KAFD World Trade Center Tower (right)

General information
- Status: Completed
- Location: Financial Blvd. Al Aqiq, Riyadh, Saudi Arabia
- Coordinates: 24°45′47″N 46°38′26″E
- Construction started: 2010
- Opened: 2022

Height
- Roof: 304 m (997.4 ft)

Technical details
- Floor count: 67
- Floor area: 137,483 m^{2} (1,479,855 sq ft)

Design and construction
- Architect: Gensler

KAFD World Trade Center is a skyscraper in the King Abdullah Financial District of Riyadh, Saudi Arabia. It was completed in 2022 and is the fourth tallest building in the country at 304 metres (997 ft), with 67 floors and nearly 1,500,000 square feet (140,000 m^{2}) of floor space. The Abraj Al Bait, Capital Market Authority Headquarters, and Burj Rafal are taller, while KAFD is slightly taller than the older and well-known Kingdom Centre. The tower was designed by Gensler.

== See also ==
- List of tallest buildings in Saudi Arabia
