= Riyadh TV Tower =

Telecommunications tower in Riyadh, Saudi Arabia

- برج تلفزيون الرياض
- The Tower in 2026

Record height
- Tallest in Saudi Arabia from 1982 to 2000^{[I]}
- Surpassed by: Al-Faisaliah Tower

General information
- Status: Completed
- Type: Television Tower
- Location: Riyadh, Saudi Arabia
- Coordinates: 24°38′35″N 46°41′45″E
- Construction started: 1975
- Completed: 1982
- Owner: Saudi Broadcasting Authority

Height
- Height: 170 m (558 ft)

Design and construction
- Architects: Maurice Novarina and Patrici Novarina-Adete

The Riyadh TV Tower (Arabic: برج تلفزيون الرياض) is a 170-metre-high (560 ft) television tower in the Al-Wisham neighborhood of Riyadh, Saudi Arabia. Construction began in 1975 and was completed in 1982. It was the tallest structure in Saudi Arabia from 1982 until 2000, when it was surpassed by Al-Faisaliah Tower.

== See also ==
- Radio masts and towers
- Saudi Broadcasting Authority
- List of tallest buildings in Saudi Arabia
- List of the tallest structures in Saudi Arabia
