= The Headquarters Business Park Tower =

Coordinates: 21.6023°N 39.1093188°E

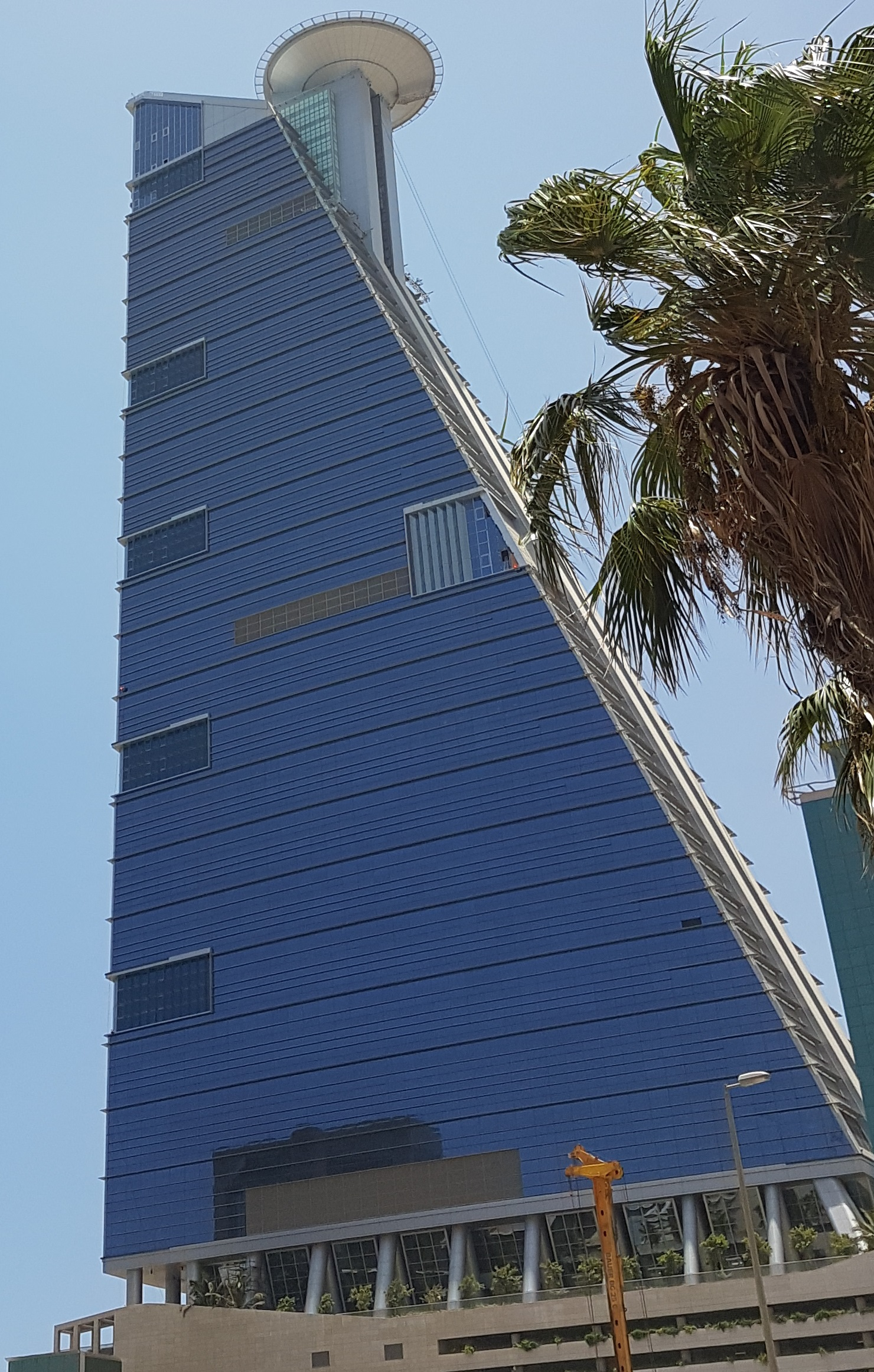
- The Headquarters Business Park Tower in 2016

General information
- Status: Completed
- Location: Jeddah, Saudi Arabia
- Construction started: 2008
- Estimated completion: mid 2011
- Opening: 2012
- Owner: Adeem Al Watania

Height
- Height: West Tower: 236 m (774 ft); East Tower: 69 m (226 ft)

Technical details
- Floor count: West Tower: 55; East Tower: 15

Design and construction
- Architect: Batley Partners
- Main contractor: Freyssinet

The Headquarters Business Park Tower is a 55-story office skyscraper located on the coast site of Jeddah, Saudi Arabia. When completed in 2012, it became the tallest building in Jeddah, overtaking the nearby King's Road Tower.

The building contains offices, clinics, and restaurants. It is served by a large 11-story parking garage and a unique heliport on the top.

== Owners ==
Adeem Al Watania, A Saudi Arabian real estate company.

== Gallery ==
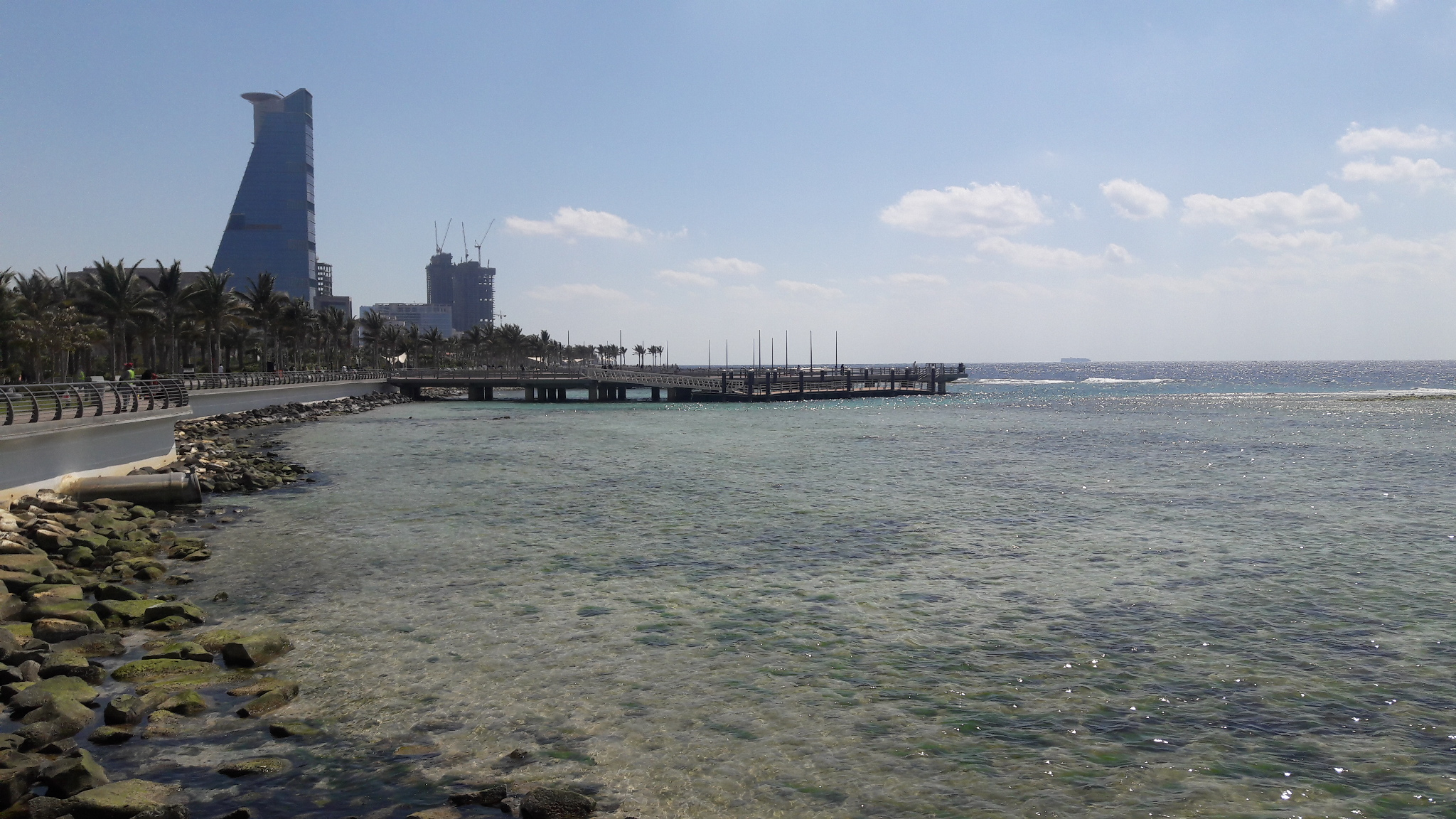
View of The Headquarters Business Park Tower along the Red Sea

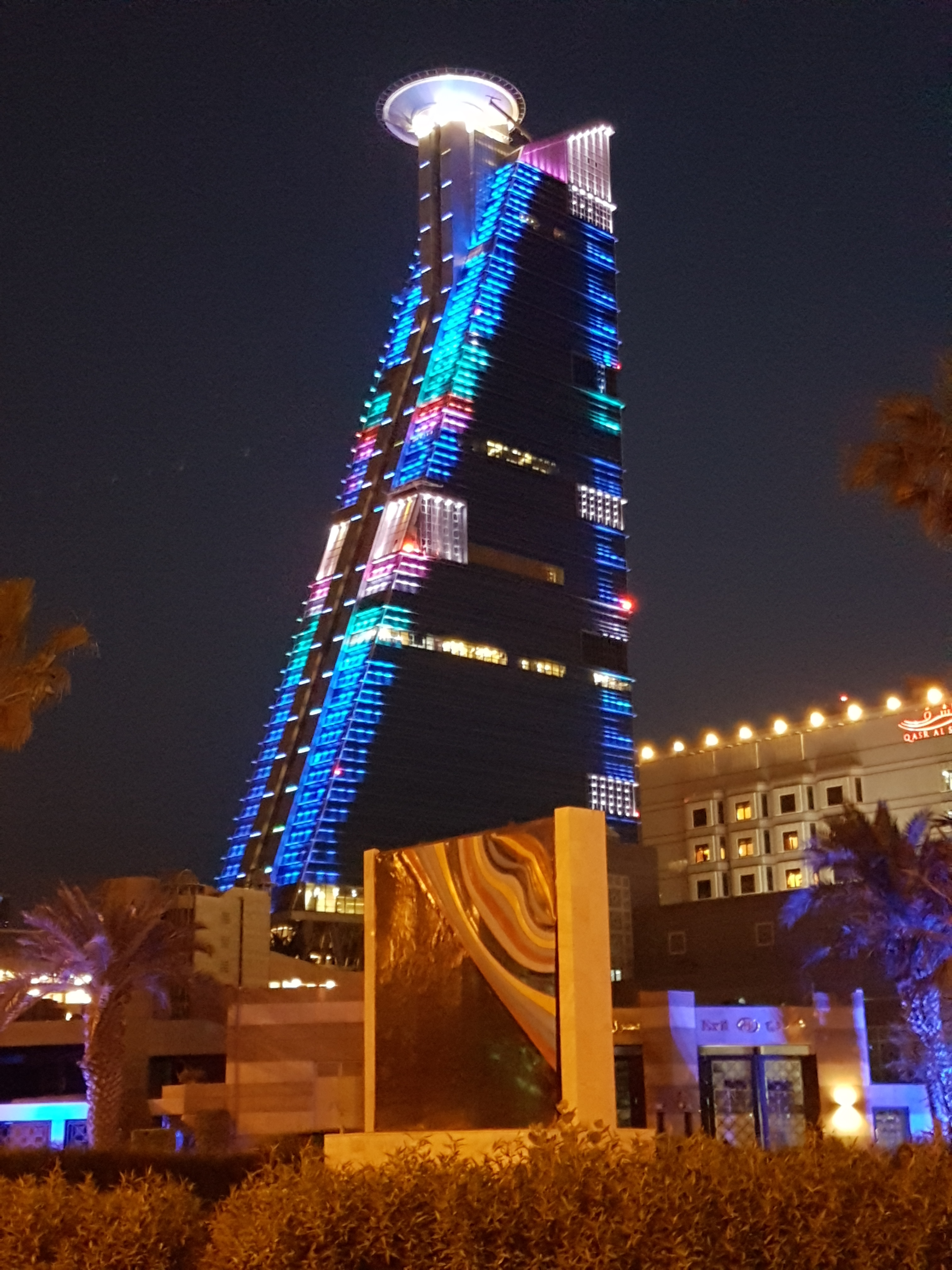
Night view of tower

== See also ==
- List of tallest buildings in Saudi Arabia
