= Narcissus Hotel and Spa Riyadh =

Hotel in Riyadh, Saudi Arabia

- Narcissus Hotel and Spa Riyadh with Al Faisaliah Tower in the background, 2024
- Alternative names: Boudl Tower
- Hotel chain: Narcissus Hotels & Resorts

General information
- Architectural style: Beaux-Arts; Neoclassical
- Location: Riyadh, Saudi Arabia
- Coordinates: 24.69593°N 46.68352°E
- Opened: 11 December 2013; 12 years ago
- Landlord: Boudl Hotels and Resorts Group

Height
- Height: 155 m (509 ft)

Technical details
- Floor count: 26

Design and construction
- Architecture firm: Abdulelah Al Mohanna Engineering Consultants (AAMEC)

Other information
- Number of rooms: 280
- Number of restaurants: 4

Website
- www.narcissusriyadh.com

Narcissus Hotel and Spa Riyadh is a five-star skyscraper hotel in the al-Olaya district of Riyadh, Saudi Arabia. Partially opened in 2013, it became fully operational by 2015. In 2017, the Boudl Tower was completed as an annex to the hotel, which stands at a height of 155 meters and, as of 2024, is the 23rd tallest building in Riyadh. It was constructed in Beaux-Arts and Neoclassical style of architecture.

== Overview ==
The hotel was partially opened in December 2013 and became fully operational by early 2015. It was the first property of the Saudi-based Boudl Hotel and Resorts. The hotel was constructed in European architectural style, incorporating elements of Beaux-Arts and Neoclassical styles. The hotel contains 280 rooms in total.

In 2013, construction began for the 155 meters tall Boudl Tower, which was completed in 2017. As of 2024, it is the 37th tallest building in Saudi Arabia and 23rd tallest in Riyadh.
