= Sumou Towers =

Pair of skyscrapers in Jeddah, Saudi Arabia

Coordinates: 21.5942°N 39.1069°E

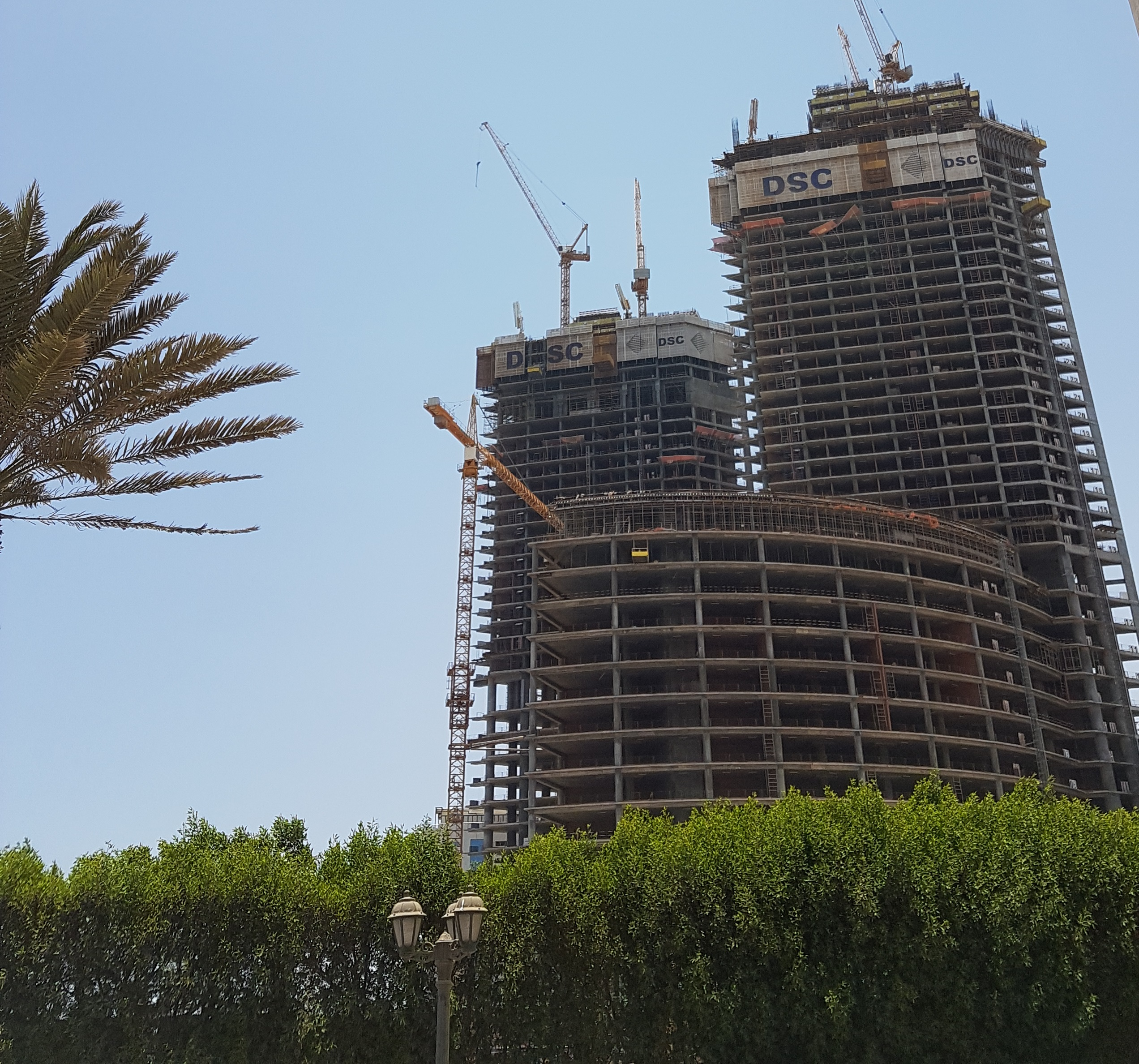
- The towers under construction in 2016
- Former names: Lamar Towers (2008–2021)

General information
- Status: Structurally Topped Out
- Type: Mixed-use
- Architectural style: Neo-futurism
- Location: Jeddah, Saudi Arabia
- Construction started: August 2008; 18 years ago
- Owner: Asmo Company

Height
- Height: South Tower: 322 m (1,056 ft); North Tower: 290 m (951 ft)

Technical details
- Floor count: 72; 63

Design and construction
- Architects: Arrand Engineering Consultants; EHAF Consulting Engineers
- Developer: Sumou Holding Company
- Main contractor: Central Construction Company

Sumou Towers (Arabic: أبراج سمو) are a pair of skyscrapers in Jeddah, Saudi Arabia. Located on the Jeddah Corniche, the development consists of two structurally topped-out towers: a 72-storey southern tower and a 63-storey northern tower.

== Overview ==
The project also includes a number of commercial offices, and at the same time, it includes a commercial shopping center (mall) that includes luxurious shops and international restaurants, in addition to a sports center, spa, and multiple areas for luxury.

The proposal for the project was submitted by Cayan in 2008 and was approved in the same year. Construction began in 2008 and, when completed in 2026, Tower 1 will be the tallest building in Jeddah, surpassing the Burj Assila / Shangri-La Hotel & Residences Jeddah. The development is expected to cost about $600 million. The tower was designed by Saudi Diyar Consultants. The Construction Management Service is by MIDRAR. The Lamar company is the main developer of the project, and Drake & Scull Construction is the main contractor for this landmark development.

The holding company has declared bankruptcy, and construction on the building has stopped. There are many civil suits against the company for property sold in these buildings.

Lamar is Arabic for liquid gold, which describes the reflection of the golden glass in the waters of the Red Sea.

Asmo Company (100% owned by Sumou Holding Company) has acquired Sumo Towers (formerly Lamar), one of the leading projects in the Kingdom of Saudi Arabia, with its prime location on the northern Corniche of Jeddah, overlooking the Red Sea. The project has been partially constructed, and Asmo aims to complete the construction and development of the project.

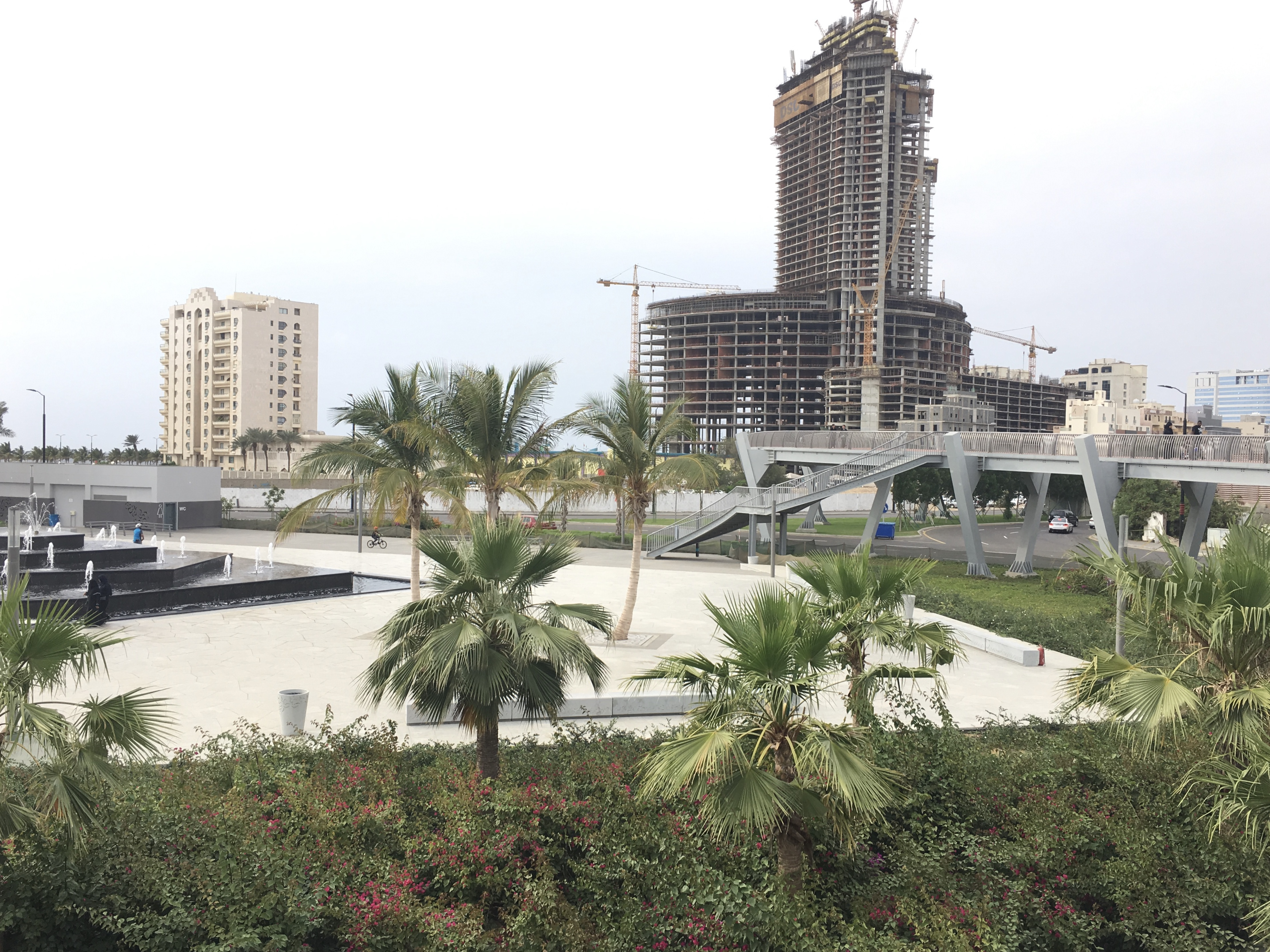
Skyline with Lamar Towers with constructed parks.

Drake & Scull International is carrying out the MEP works, with KASKTAS Arabia responsible for the piling, shoring, grouting, soil improvement, and dewatering works. The architectural and engineering concept and schematic design for Lamar Towers was undertaken by RMJM Dubai.

The main contract was originally awarded to Arabian Construction Company in October 2008, but it was reportedly subsequently reawarded to Arabtec in May 2009 by developer Cayan Investment & Development, according to Arab News. The structure part of the project was then awarded on 12 October 2010 to the Saudi-Lebanese Tarouk Contracting Company Ltd, who constructed a substantial part of the project and two towers (up to level 26 for both towers) before being terminated by the owner on 31 December 2012. The remaining part of the structure and the Project were transferred in July 2013 to the UAE-based general contractor Drake & Scull Construction, part of the Drake & Scull International PJSC group.

Asmo Company (100% owned by Sumou Holding Company) has acquired Sumo Towers (formerly Lamar), one of the leading projects in the Kingdom of Saudi Arabia, with its prime location on the northern Corniche of Jeddah, overlooking the Red Sea. The project has been partially constructed, and Asmo aims to complete the construction and development of the project.

== See also ==
- List of tallest buildings in Saudi Arabia
