= Mandarin Oriental Al Faisaliah, Riyadh =

Five star hotel in Riyadh, Saudi Arabia

- فندق الفيصلية
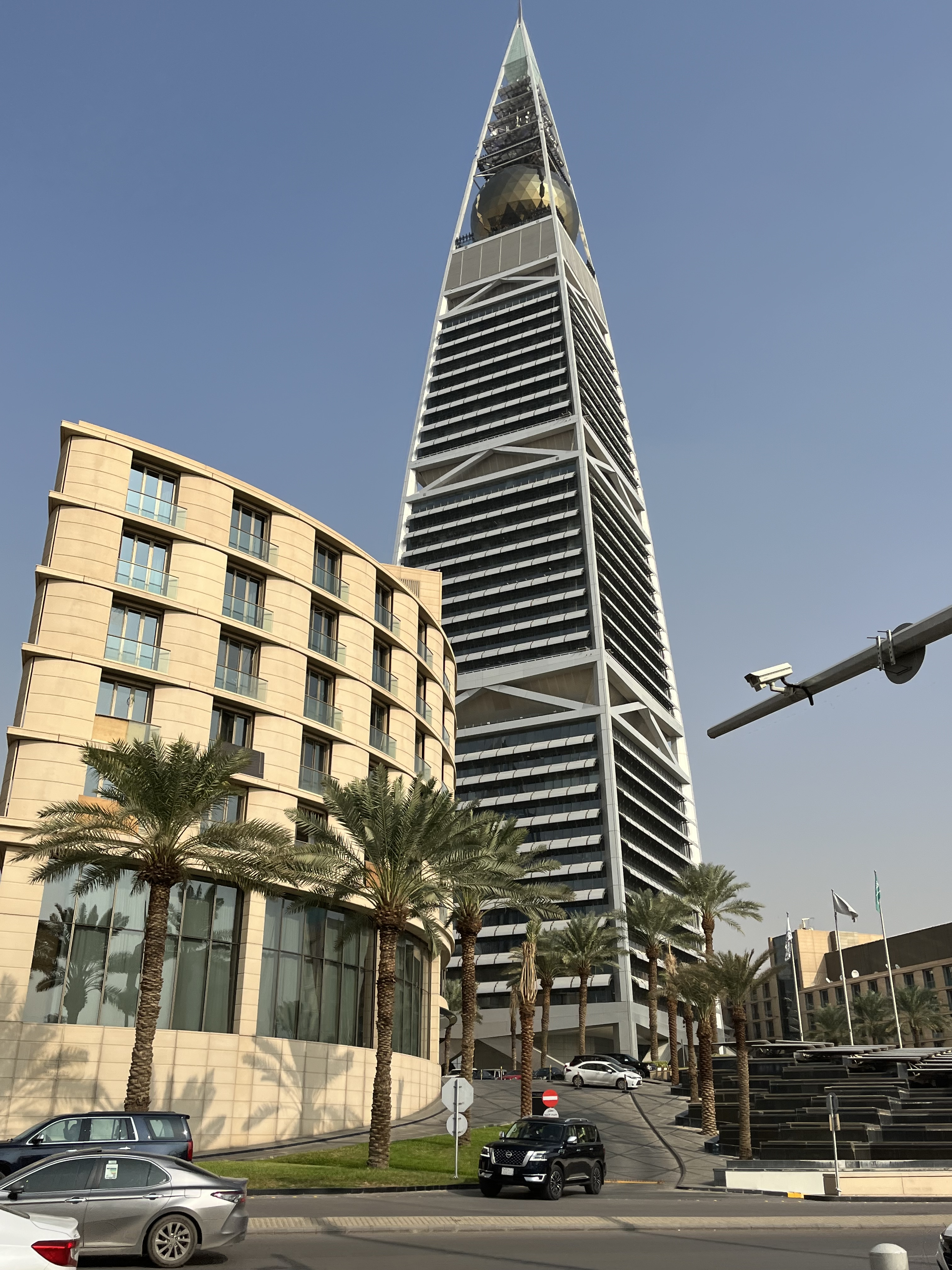
- Mandarin Oriental Al Faisaliah Hotel (left) with the Al Faisaliah Tower in the background, 2023
- Interactive map of the Mandarin Oriental Al Faisaliah, Riyadh area
- Former names: Al Faisaliah Hotel (2000–2024)

General information
- Location: Riyadh, Saudi Arabia, King Fahd Rd, Al-Olaya, Riyadh 11491
- Coordinates: 24°41′25″N 46°41′2″E
- Named for: Faisal bin Abdulaziz
- Opened: May 2000; 25 years ago
- Owner: Mandarin Oriental Hotel Group

Technical details
- Floor count: 7

Other information
- Number of rooms: 325

Website
- www.mandarinoriental.com/en/riyadh/olaya

Mandarin Oriental Al Faisaliah, Riyadh, formerly Al Faisaliah Hotel (Arabic: فندق الفيصلية), is a five-star hotel in the al-Olaya district of Riyadh, Saudi Arabia, located adjacent to the al-Faisaliah Tower. Opened in 2000, it has been managed by the Mandarin Oriental Hotel Group since 2021 and assumed its current name in 2024. The hotel is frequented mostly by businessmen and is known for hosting weddings for members of the Saudi royal family as well as other elites.

== History ==
The hotel opened in May 2000, alongside the Al-Faisaliah Tower. It was initially managed by Rosewood Hotels & Resorts as Al-Faisaliah Hotel, A Rosewood Hotel, with 189 rooms and 35 suites. In April 2015, the Al-Khozama Management Company acquired the hotel's management services and brought an end to the 20 year old partnership with Rosewood Hotels. The hotel had 224 rooms and 106 suites at the time.

In November 2020, Hong Kong-based Mandarin Oriental Hotel Group signed an agreement with Al-Khozama Management Company and took over the hotel in March 2021. Following the takeover, the hotel underwent extensive renovations. When they were completed, the hotel was officially rebranded as Mandarin Oriental Al Faisaliah, Riyadh on January 17, 2024.

== Restaurants and lounges ==
The Globe is the signature restaurant of the hotel, whereas other restaurants include the Asir Lounge, La Brasserie, La Brasserie Cafe, LPM Restaurant & Café, Mamo Michelangelo, Meraki, Yauatcha and The Mandarin Lounge.
