= Al Jawhara Tower =

Residential high-rise building in Jeddah, Saudi Arabia

- برج الجوهرة
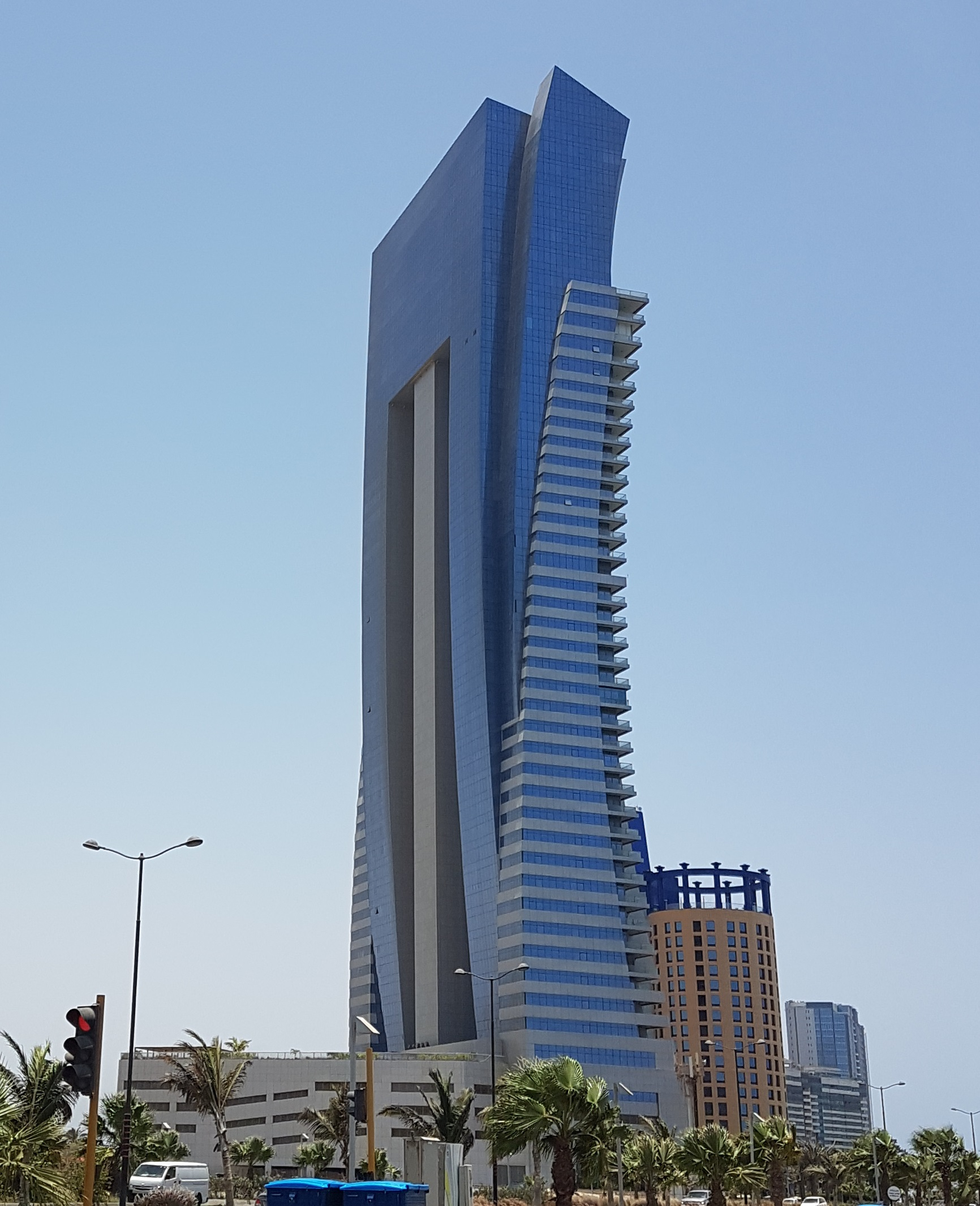
- Al Jawhara Tower in May 2016

General information
- Status: Completed
- Type: Residential
- Architectural style: Futurism
- Location: Al Kurnaysh Road, Jeddah, Saudi Arabia
- Coordinates: 21°34′40.2″N 39°06′36.6″E
- Construction started: 8 November 2009
- Completed: 26 January 2014
- Client: Zuhair Fayez Partnership
- Owner: DAMAC Properties

Height
- Roof: 187 m (614 ft)

Technical details
- Floor count: 48
- Lifts/elevators: 19

Design and construction
- Architecture firm: WBTL Architects
- Structural engineer: Salama Structural Engineers
- Main contractor: GTCC & ICC Joint Venture

Al Jawhara Tower is a 48-story residential high-rise building in Jeddah, Saudi Arabia. Standing at a height of 187 m (614 ft), it is one of the tallest buildings in the city. Construction of the building started in November 2009 and was completed in January 2014. Upon its completion, it became the tallest residential building in Jeddah until 2018, when it was surpassed by the Golden Tower. The building is owned by DAMAC Properties.

== Gallery ==
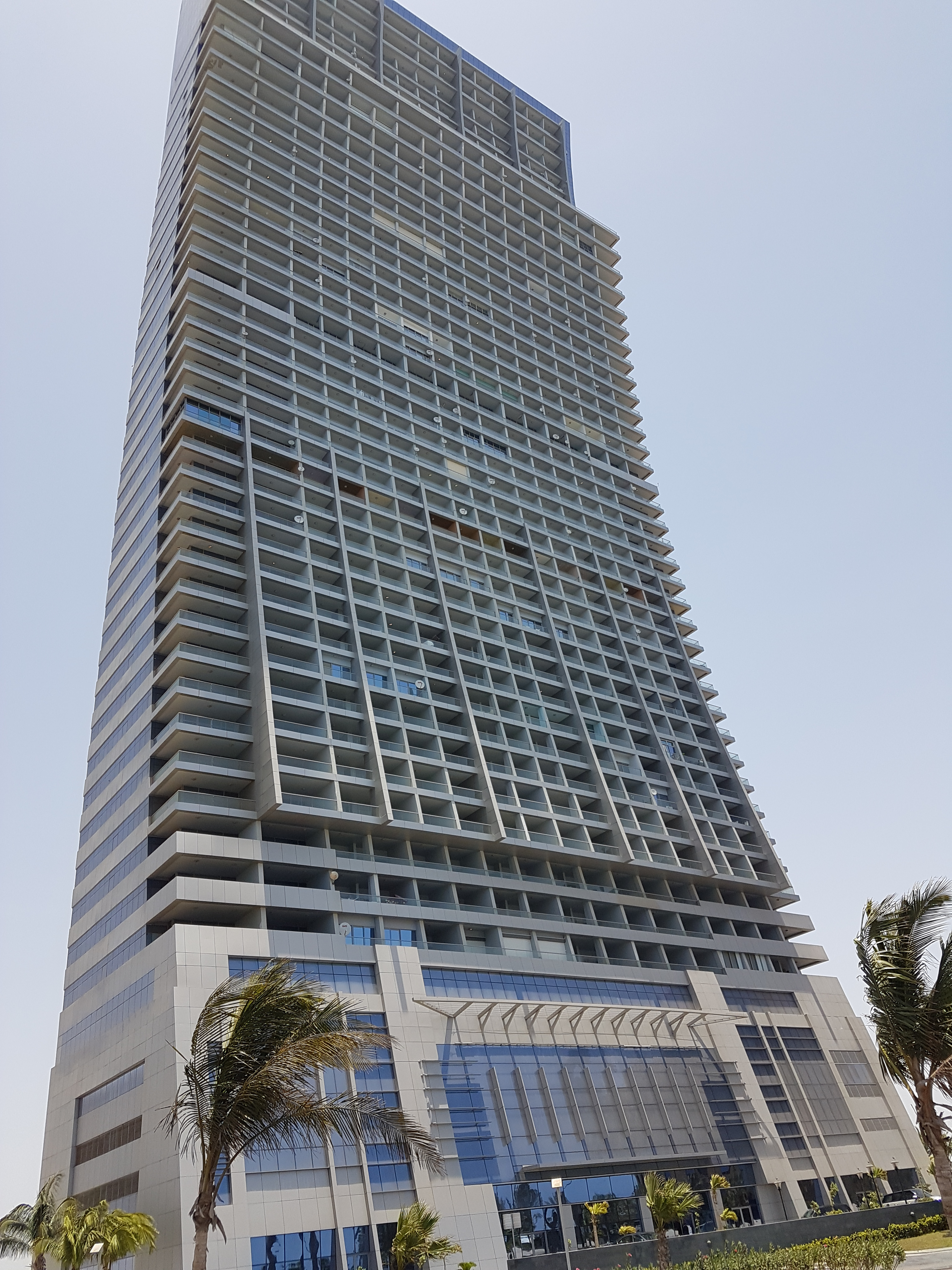
A view of the concave facade of the Al Jawhara Tower

== See also ==
- List of tallest buildings in Saudi Arabia
