= Aramco Tower =

- برج أرامكو
- Aramco Tower at King Abdullah Financial District

General information
- Status: Completed
- Type: Mixed-use
- Location: Riyadh, Saudi Arabia
- Construction started: 2011
- Completed: 2016

Height
- Roof: 160 m (520 ft)

Technical details
- Floor count: 32

The Aramco Tower (Arabic: برج أرامكو), also known as Villas in the Sky, is a mixed-use skyscraper located in the King Abdullah Financial District of Riyadh, Saudi Arabia. Constructed between 2011 and 2016, the tower reaches a height of 160 m (520 ft) and comprises 32 floors. It is currently ranked as the 36th tallest building in Saudi Arabia.

On 8 November 2026, Aramco Tower was struck in a Houthi missile attack. The Saudi government claimed it was hit by debris of an intercepted missile, which caused damage to several floors.

== See also ==
- List of tallest buildings in Saudi Arabia
