= Burj Assila =

Skyscraper in Jeddah, Saudi Arabia

- برج أصيلة

General information
- Status: Completed
- Type: Hotel, Residential
- Architectural style: Modernism
- Location: Al Kurnaysh Road, Jeddah, Saudi Arabia
- Coordinates: 21.6225°N 39.1080°E
- Construction started: 2012
- Completed: 2021
- Owner: Shangri-La Hotels and Resorts

Height
- Roof: 264.7 m (868 ft)

Technical details
- Floor count: 65

Design and construction
- Architects: Perkins & Will; Mohamad Harasani Architects
- Structural engineer: Boll & Partner
- Main contractor: Al Saad General Contracting

Burj Assila (Arabic: برج أصيلة, romanized: Burj 'asila) also known as Shangri-La Hotel & Residences Jeddah is a skyscraper hotel in the Jeddah Corniche district of Jeddah, Saudi Arabia. Built between 2012 and 2021, the tower stands at 264.7 m (868 ft) tall with 65 floors and is the current third tallest building in Jeddah, and the 10th overall in Saudi Arabia.

== History ==
Burj Assila was designed by the American global architectural firm Perkins & Will, the same design practice of other supertall skyscrapers such as the Chase Tower in Chicago, the Burj Khalifa in Dubai, and the Antilia in Mumbai.

The building is located on the shores of the Red Sea, and was initially planned to house a total of 104 serviced apartments and a parking lot for 600 cars upon completion. It houses the only Shangri-La Hotel in the city and was officially opened on February 22, 2022, during the Kingdom's inaugural Founding Day with a total of 220 accommodations occupying 60,000 m^{2} (646,000 sq ft) with leisures such as restaurants and wellness clubs. It is the tallest hotel in Jeddah.

The building's main hotel function features serviced apartments and condominiums with a gradual deepening of exterior spaces. Every level features recessed outdoor balconies framed by clear glass balustrades. The concept bases on open latticework reinterpreting historic Jeddah mashrabiya screens. It was the recipient of the 2009 MIPIM AR Future Projects Award.

== See also ==
- List of tallest buildings in Saudi Arabia
- List of tallest structures in the Middle East
