= List of the tallest structures in Saudi Arabia =

This is a list of the tallest structures in Saudi Arabia. The list contains all types of structures taller than 200 metres in Saudi Arabia. Please correct where necessary and expand.

Place	Structure	Structural type	Year of built	Pinnacle height	Pinnacle height	Geographical coordinates	Remarks
Mecca	Abraj Al Bait	Skyscraper	2012	1972 ft	601 m	21°25′5.23″N 39°49′32.51″E	
Jeddah	Jeddah Tower	Skyscraper	2026	1555 ft	474 m	21.734103°N 39.082980°E	Under Construction
Riyadh	Burj Rafal	Skyscraper	2014	1010 ft	308 m	24°47′32.85″N 46°37′56.34″E	
Riyadh	Kingdom Centre	Skyscraper	2002	992 ft	302.3 m	24°42′41.14″N 46°40′27.88″E	
Riyadh	Al Faisaliyah Center	Skyscraper	2000	876 ft	267 m	24°41′24.91″N 46°41′6.3″E	
Mecca	ZamZam Tower	Skyscraper	2012	869 ft	265 m		
Mecca	Hajar Tower	Skyscraper	2012	869 ft	265 m		
Riyadh	Tamkeen Tower	Skyscraper	2012	869 ft	265 m		
Yanbu	Yanbu TV Mast	Guyed mast	?	858 ft	261.5 m	23°59′27.67″N 38°17′40.27″E	
Jeddah	Jeddah TV Tower	Tower	2006	820 ft	250 m	21°28′22.62″N 39°11′58.55″E	
Jeddah	National Commercial Bank Building	Skyscraper	?	771 ft	235 m		
Mecca	Safa Tower	Skyscraper	2007	738 ft	225 m		
Mecca	Marwah Tower	Skyscraper	2008	738 ft	225 m		
Al Muwassam	Al Muwassam LORAN-C transmitter	Guyed mast	?	731 ft	222.8 m	16°25′55.65″N 42°48′5.2″E	insulated against ground
Afif	Afif LORAN-C transmitter	Guyed mast	?	727 ft	221.6 m	23°48′37.24″N 42°51′18.56″E	insulated against ground
Salwa	Salwa LORAN-C transmitter	Guyed mast	?	725 ft	221 m	24°50′1.55″N 50°34′12.71″E	insulated against ground
Ash Shayk	Ash Shayk LORAN-C transmitter	Guyed mast	?	722 ft	220 m	28°09′16.02″N 34°45′40.83″E	insulated against ground
Al Lith	Rahman transmitter	Guyed mast	?	722 ft	220 m	20°13′59.74″N 40°12′32.88″E	insulated against ground
Jeddah	Jeddah Municipality	Skyscraper	?	722 ft	220 m		
Jeddah	Islamic Development Bank Building	Skyscraper	?	689 ft	210 m		
Shaqra	Shaqra TV Mast	Guyed mast	?	674 ft	205.4 m	25°14′11.68″N 45°15′49.32″E	
Ras Al Khair	Ras Al Zawr Large Mediumwave Radio Mast	Guyed mast	?	674 ft	205.4 m	27°27′34.08″N 49°18′15.47″E	insulated against ground
Al Khafji	Al Khafji TV Mast	Guyed mast	?	666 ft	203 m	28°29′59.95″N 48°26′31.74″E	
Al Khobar	Dhahran Tower	Skyscraper	2012	656 ft	200 m		
Riyadh	Al Nakheel Tower	Skyscraper	2011	656 ft	200 m		
Dariyah	Dariyah TV Mast	Guyed mast	?	644 ft	196.3 m	24°22′12.16″N 42°44′58″E	
Dammam	Ad Danah Radio Mast	Guyed mast	?	601 ft	183.2 m	26°27′42.44″N 50°2′30.25″E	insulated against ground
Sharorah	Sharorah TV Mast	Guyed mast	?	600 ft	182.9 m	17°29′18.43″N 47°6′11.42″E	
