= Rise Tower =

Proposed 2 km tall megatall skyscraper in Saudi Arabia

- برج رايز

General information
- Status: Proposed
- Location: Riyadh, Saudi Arabia
- Coordinates: 24.838844°N 46.618058°E
- Cost: US$5 billion

Height
- Height: 2,008 m (6,588 ft)

Technical details
- Floor count: 678

Design and construction
- Architecture firm: Foster and Partners, HKS Architects
- Developer: Public Investment Fund

Rise Tower (Arabic: برج رايز) is a proposed megatall skyscraper in Riyadh, Saudi Arabia. Planned to be the first two-kilometre-tall building, it would surpass both Burj Khalifa at 829 m (2,720 ft) and Jeddah Tower at 1,000 m (3,300 ft) to become the world’s tallest building or structure.

== Location and site ==
Rise Tower is sited in North Riyadh within a broader mixed-use masterplan widely reported as the "North Pole" district, with proximity to King Khalid International Airport (KKIA). and the capital’s northern growth corridor. Popular-press explainers describe the district as a large “city of the future” concept anchored by a central business hub.

== Overview ==
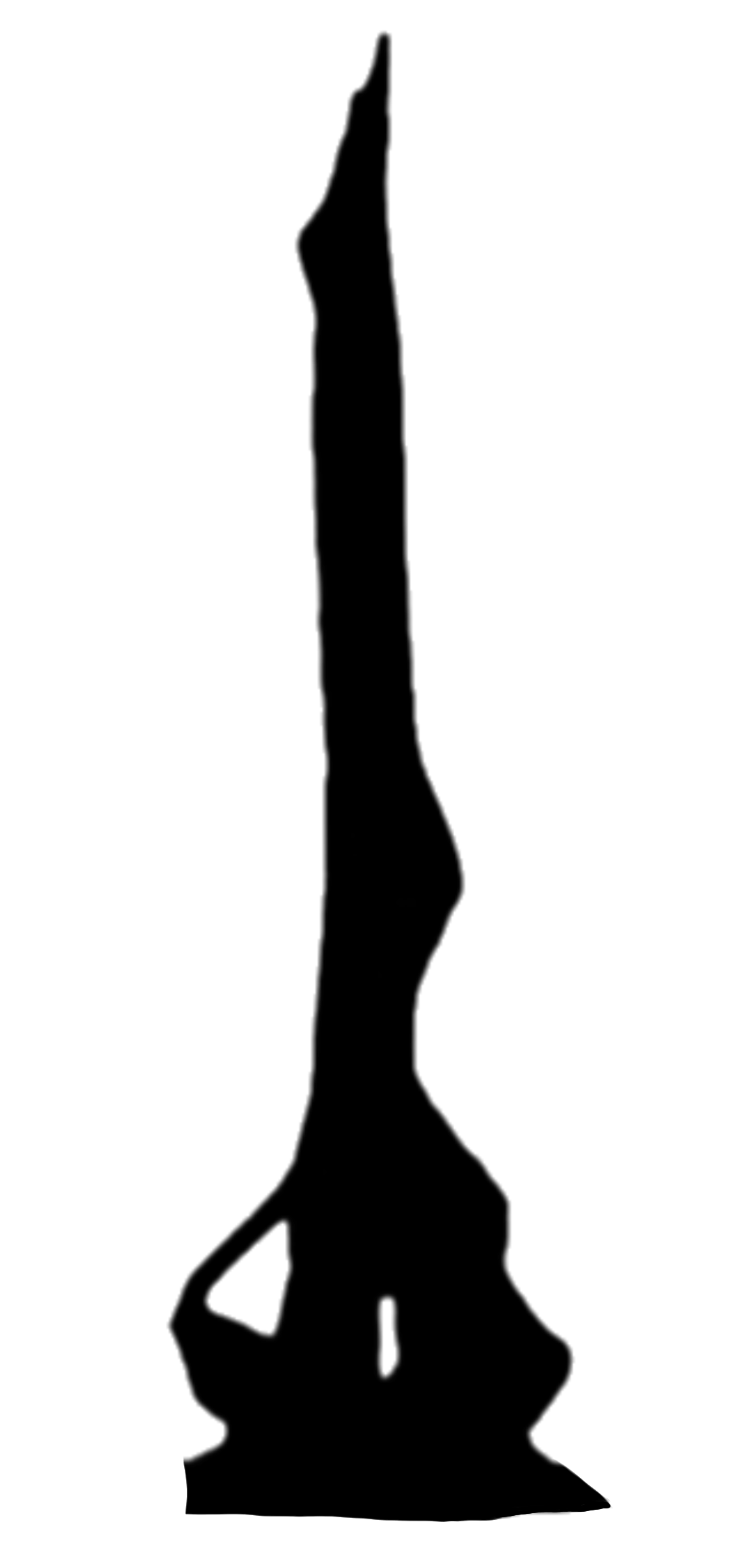
Concept design of Rise Tower

In December 2022, industry publications like MEED reported that the Public Investment Fund (PIF) was considering a plan to build a record-breaking tower as part of an approximately 18 km^{2} (6.9 sq mi) development in North Riyadh, with preliminary cost estimates around US$5 billion. In August 2023, almost six months after the announcement of New Murabba project, the designs of Rise Tower were unveiled by Mohammed al-Qahtani, the CEO of Saudi Arabia Holding Company. In 2025, coverage shifted to procurement: reporting mentioned tendering for the North Pole district and a ~2 km tower concept attributed to Foster + Partners.

== Design ==
Competition reporting and early renders attribute the concept design to Foster + Partners. A 2-kilometre target height and a 678-storey programme have been reported by the trade press; official detailed specifications have not yet been published by the proponent. The tower is positioned as a centrepiece for a new business district intended to complement major Riyadh initiatives in the lead-up to Expo 2030.

== Status ==
As of October 2026, no formal groundbreaking date, contract awards, or definitive specifications have been announced by the developer or PIF beyond reported tender activity. PIF’s public list of giga-projects does not presently include North Pole or Rise Tower, indicating the scheme remains at proposal/competition stage.

== Images ==
- Concept rendering (Day aerial): https://pbs.twimg.com/media/Gx_vAWcWMAEbtLM?format=jpg&name=4096x4096
- Concept rendering (daytime ground view): https://pbs.twimg.com/media/Gx_u6-4WwAAc_Bj?format=jpg&name=4096x4096
- Concept rendering (night view): https://thesaudiboom.com/wp-content/uploads/2025/08/1-Rise-Tower-Riyadh-to-Become-the-Worlds-Tallest-Building-Surpassing-Burj-Khalifa-and-Jeddah-Tower.png Size: 1999×1125 pixels

== See also ==
- List of tallest buildings in Saudi Arabia
- List of visionary tall buildings and structures
