= Olaya Towers =

Skyscrapers

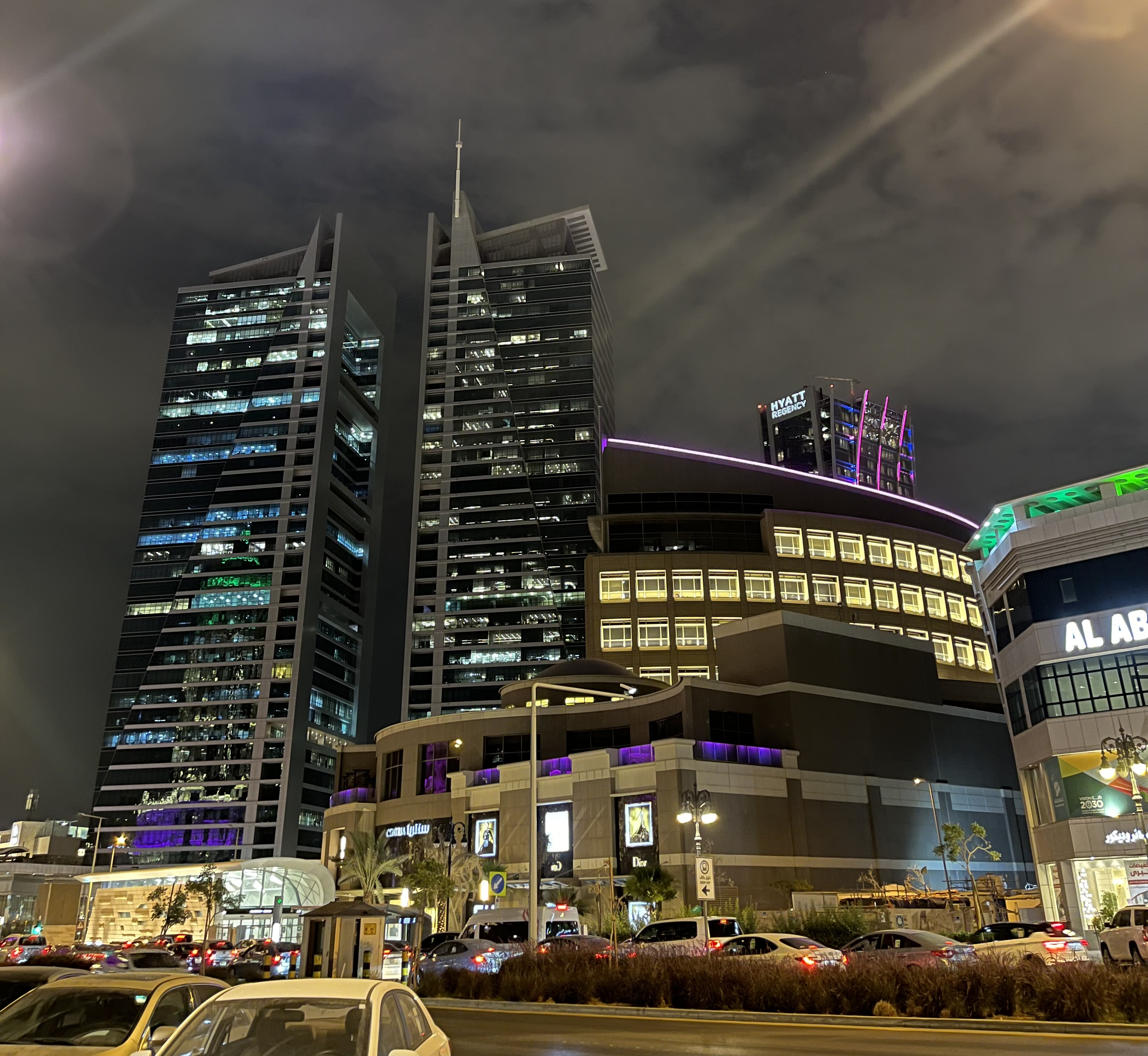
- Olaya Towers, 2024

General information
- Status: Completed
- Location: Riyadh, Saudi Arabia
- Construction started: 2011
- Completed: 2013
- Opening: 2014
- Owner: Jawda Integrated Real Estate

Height
- Height: Tower 1: 203.4 m (667 ft); Tower 2: 166.3 m (546 ft)

Technical details
- Floor count: Tower 1: 38; Tower 2: 34

Design and construction
- Main contractor: Nesma & Partners Contracting Co. Ltd.

Olaya Towers (Arabic: أبراج العليا) are a pair of commercial skyscrapers in Riyadh, Saudi Arabia. It was built between 2011 and 2013. The height of Tower 1 is measured at 166.3 meters (546 ft), making it the 31st tallest building in Saudi Arabia and 17th tallest in Riyadh, whereas Tower 2 stands at 203.4 meters (667 ft), making the latter 21st tallest in Saudi Arabia and 11th tallest in Riyadh.

== Gallery ==
Olaya towers under construction in April 2013

== See also ==
- List of tallest buildings in Saudi Arabia
