= Tamkeen Tower =

Skyscraper in Riyadh, Saudi Arabia

- برج تمكين
- Tamkeen Tower under construction in May 2011

General information
- Status: Completed
- Type: Office
- Architectural style: Modernism
- Location: Riyadh, Saudi Arabia
- Coordinates: 24.8215°N 46.6198°E
- Construction started: 2009
- Completed: 2012
- Owner: Alrajhi Bank

Height
- Roof: 258.2 m (847 ft)

Technical details
- Floor count: 58 (+4 underground)
- Floor area: 115,820 m^{2} (1,246,676 sq ft)

Design and construction
- Architect: Khatib and Alami
- Developer: Al Rajhi Holding
- Main contractor: Al Rajhi Projects

The Tamkeen Tower (Arabic: برج تمكين, romanized: Burj tamkin) formerly known as the ARIJ Tower is an office skyscraper in Riyadh, Saudi Arabia. Built between 2009 and 2012, the tower stands at 258.2 m (847 ft) tall with 58 floors and is the current 7th tallest building in Riyadh and the 13th overall in the country.

== History ==
The tower was designed by the international firm of Khatib and Alami with the main functionality of office suites, housing a total of 115,820 m^{2} (1,246,676 sq ft) of floor area and a leasable area of 48,710 m^{2} (524,310 sq ft). It is situated in the Al Olaya district of the city, in the proximity of the King Fahd Road.

At the moment of its inauguration, the tower was mainly surrounded by undeveloped land. This was part of an economic strategy followed by various developers who were waiting for land prices to grow as much as possible before creating projects as Riyadh sprawled heavily into its northern outskirts in the 2010s. However, Al Rajhi Holding Group, through Tamkeen Real Estate Development Company, established the tower as a response for the real estate market data.

The Tamkeen Tower is an office skyscraper located in Riyadh, Saudi Arabia. It has 58 floors and 258 meters high including the needles (213 meters without them). It was built between 2009 and 2012, and holds the positions of the third tallest building in Riyadh, fourth tallest in Saudi Arabia and the 169th tallest in the world. At the top levels, the building features a raised passageway and two symmetrical antenna needles. During night time, the facades of the building are partially illuminated in various colors, depicting a curve similar to a parabola. The structure is mainly sustained by a central concrete core and perimetral columns, elements which provide stability and support to the tower. The tower has four underground parking levels that can accommodate more than 1,200 cars, a ground floor and a mezzanine. The upper floors consist of offices and shops.

== See also ==
- List of tallest buildings in Saudi Arabia
- List of tallest structures in the Middle East
