= Hamad Tower =

Commercial skyscraper in Riyadh, Saudi Arabia

- برج حمد

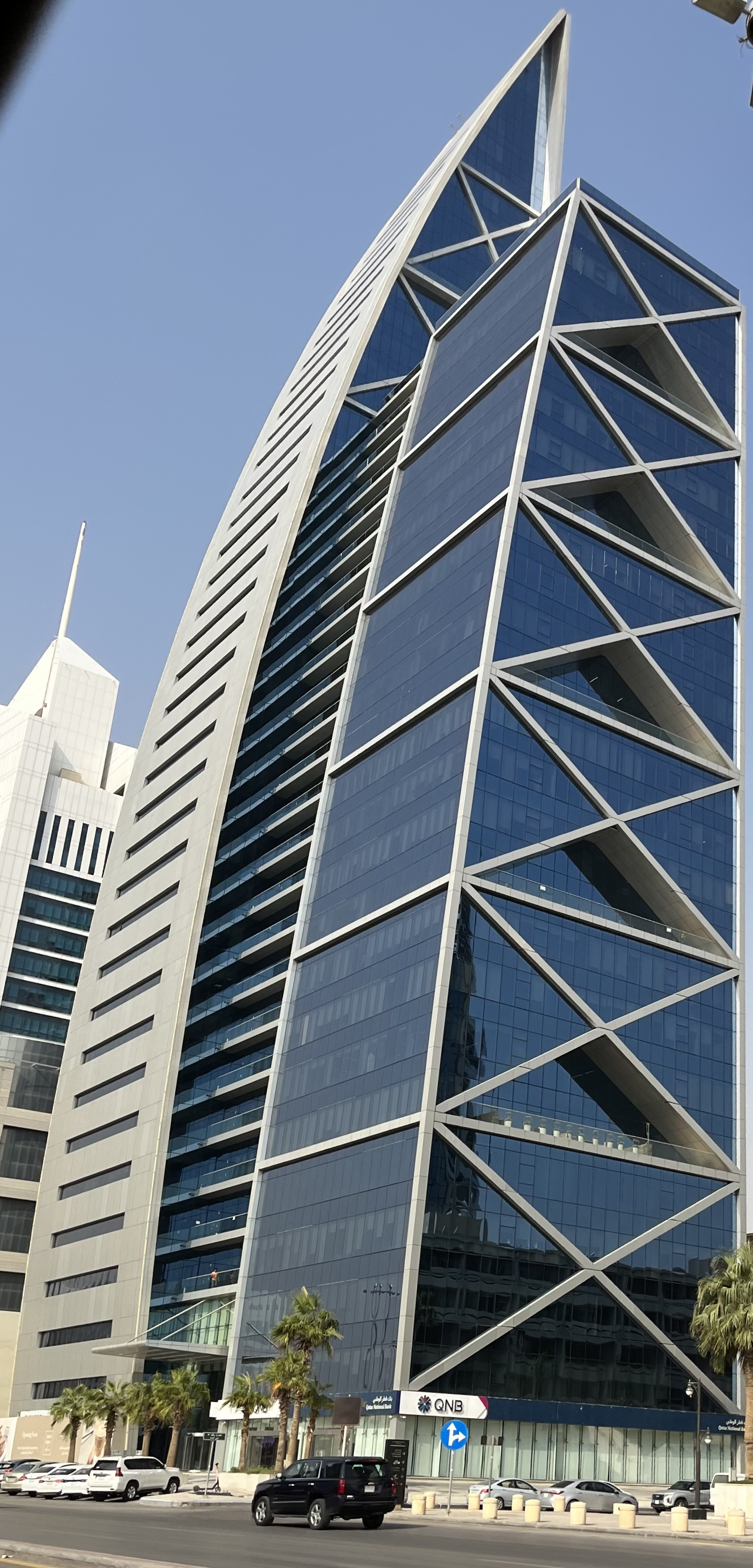
- Hamad Tower, 2023

General information
- Status: Completed
- Type: Office
- Architectural style: Modern Najdi
- Location: Riyadh, Saudi Arabia
- Coordinates: 24°41′31″N 46°40′58″E
- Named for: Sheikh Hamad bin Saleh al-Hamoudi
- Construction started: 2010
- Completed: 2016
- Owner: Etihad Al Khaledia Company

Height
- Height: 163 m (535 ft)

Technical details
- Floor count: 39
- Grounds: 38,000 m^{2} (409,000 sq ft)

Design and construction
- Architecture firm: Abdulelah Al Mohanna Engineering Consultants (AAMEC)
- Main contractor: Al Tameer Development & Construction

Website
- hamadtower.com

Hamad Tower (Arabic: برج حمد) is a commercial skyscraper in the Al-Olaya district of Riyadh, Saudi Arabia, located next to the Al-Faisaliah Tower. With a height of 163 meters (535 ft), it is the 20th tallest building in Riyadh and 34th tallest in Saudi Arabia. It was built between 2010 and 2016 and is one of the prominent landmarks of the city. The tower is named after Sheikh Hamad bin Saleh al-Hamoudi and hosts the offices of multiple multinational firms, including Atkins, Holman Fenwick Willan, Systra, Samsung and Lenovo.

== Anchor tenants ==
- Atkins
- Qatar National Bank Group
- Holman Fenwick Willan
- Systra
- Egis Group
- TIME Entertainment
- United Modern Technologies
- Turner and Townsend
- Kone
- Xceltra
- Unifonic
- Samsung
- Lenovo
- SimCorp
- Saudi Icon Company
- Driver Trett Group
