= Abraj Kudai =

Hotel in Saudi Arabia

Coordinates: 21.4018°N 39.8288°E

General information
- Status: On-hold
- Type: Hotel
- Location: Mecca, Saudi Arabia
- Construction started: 2015
- Cost: US$3.5 billion

Height
- Architectural: 230 metres (750 ft)

Technical details
- Floor count: 45

Design and construction
- Architect: Dar Al-Handasah

Other information
- Number of rooms: 10,000
- Number of restaurants: 70

Website
- www.dar.com/work/project/abraj-kudai

Abraj Kudai is a partially built hotel in Mecca, Saudi Arabia. Originally projected to open in 2017, construction was halted in 2015 due to financial difficulties. As of 2023, the hotel has yet to be opened to the public. If completed, it would be the largest hotel in the world, consisting of a ring of 12 towers 45 stories high, with 10,000 bedrooms, 70 restaurants, and four rooftop helipads. There will also be five floors for the sole use of the Saudi royal family. According to Arabian Business, 10 of the towers will provide four-star accommodations, while the other two towers will be reserved for special clientele offering five-star amenities.

The estimated project cost is US$3.5 billion, and will cover approximately 1.4 million square metres. The London-based firm Areen Hospitality has been contracted to design the hotel and the rooms' interiors.

== Controversy ==
As the owner of the Abraj Kudai project, the Kingdom of Saudi Arabia's Ministry of Finance is also a prime customer of The Saudi Binladin Group (SBL), one of the country's largest construction companies. The actions of the government directly affect SBL and so when low oil prices began propelling the government "to cancel or suspend projects and delay payments", SBL suffers too. Further exacerbating the situation, as reported by Gulf Business, was when one of SBL's cranes fell into the Grand Mosque in Mecca, resulting in 107 deaths and the company being banned "from receiving new state contracts altogether." In response to its potential financial collapse, the conglomerate laid off thousands of employees and stopped work on several important projects including Abraj Kudai.

== See also ==
- List of largest hotels
