= Al-Nakheel Tower =

Coordinates: 24.748836°N 46.652761°E

Al Nakheel Tower
- برج النخيل

General information
- Location: Riyadh, Saudi Arabia
- Construction started: 2008
- Completed: 2011

Technical details
- Floor count: 26

Design and construction
- Architecture firm: Saudi Architects

Al Nakheel Tower (Arabic: برج النخيل) is a 26-floor commercial skyscraper in Riyadh, Saudi Arabia. It was built from 2008 to 2011. When it opened, with a height of 200 meters (656 ft), it was the 22nd tallest building in Saudi Arabia and 12th tallest in Riyadh. The estimated building cost was 400 million Riyals. The tower was developed by Saudi company RAYEK (owned by AlAjlan Allied Group) and designed by British company Atkins. Originally, the tower was supposed to have 50 floors.

== See also ==
- List of tallest buildings in Saudi Arabia
