= Al-Anoud Tower =

Skyscraper in Riyadh, Saudi Arabia

Anoud Tower
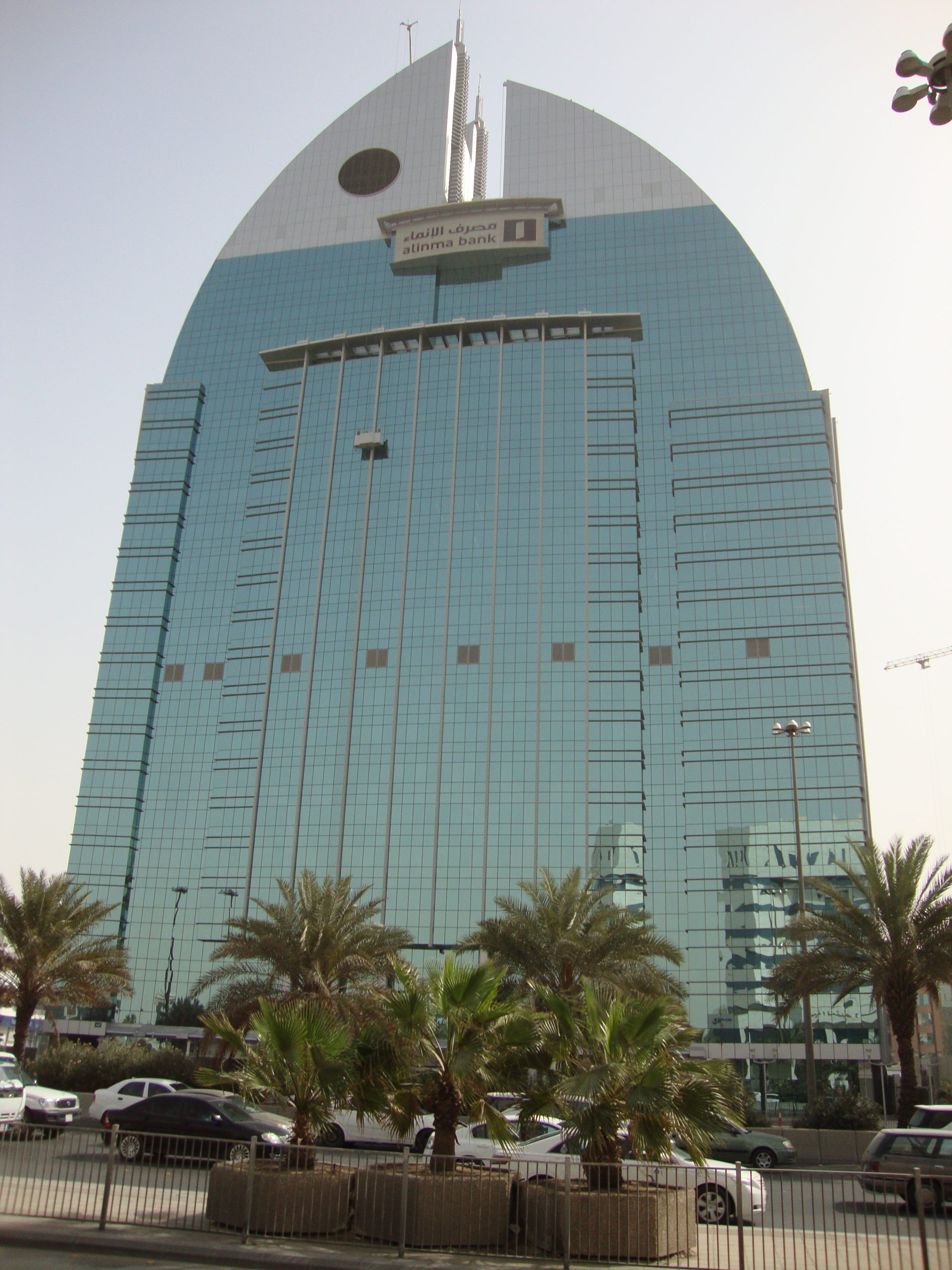

General information
- Type: Mixed-use
- Location: Riyadh, Saudi Arabia
- Completed: 2005
- Owner: Princess Al-Anoud Foundation

Height
- Antenna spire: 155 m (509 ft)

Technical details
- Floor count: 23

Anoud Tower (Arabic: برج العنود) is a skyscraper in the al-Olaya district of Riyadh, Saudi Arabia. It was completed in 2005. At 155 m high, it is a major commercial building on King Fahd road. It contains 20 floors with 3 basement levels. A twin tower is being completed alongside it. The tower is named after Princess Al Anoud bint Abdul Aziz bin Mousaed al-Saud, the wife of King Fahd bin Abdulaziz and is moderated by several Saudi Arabian companies including Alinma Bank Head Office & Novotel Hotels. The building design is based on a swordfish.

The tower includes exhibition spaces covering 1,200 square meters (13,000 square feet), office spaces totaling 15,000 square meters (160,000 square feet), 300 parking spaces, and sixteen elevators.

== Novotel Hotel ==
In 2015, the France-based hospitality group Accor opened its fifth hotel in Riyadh, housed within Al Anoud Tower, under the Novotel brand. The four-star hotel features 135 rooms and 32 suites, a health club covering over 1,000 square meters (11,000 square feet), a main ballroom of the same size that can accommodate more than 400 guests, and a variety of meeting rooms.
