= Al Rajhi Bank Tower =

- برج الراجحي

General information
- Status: Completed
- Type: Office
- Location: Riyadh, Saudi Arabia, King Fahd Road
- Coordinates: 24.750086°N 46.653576°E
- Construction started: 2013
- Completed: 2017
- Opened: April 23, 2019

Height
- Height: 205 metres (673 ft)

Technical details
- Floor count: 37

Design and construction
- Architects: Skidmore, Owings and Merrill (concept); RSP Architects Planners & Engineers (design)
- Developer: Al Rajhi Bank

Alrajhi Bank Tower (Arabic: برج الراجحي), also known as Alrajhi Bank Headquarters, is a 205-meter (673 ft) tall commercial skyscraper located in the al-Muruj neighborhood of Riyadh, Saudi Arabia. The tower serves as the headquarters for Alrajhi Bank.

== History ==
In May 2006, it was announced that a tower will be built to accommodate Alrajhi Bank. In November 2012, a contract was awarded to a joint venture of South Korea's Samsung C&T and the local Contracting & Construction Enterprises (CCE) to construct the new building. At that time, the project was scheduled to be completed by the end of 2015. Construction of the building was then started in 2013. In the early hours of June 3, 2015, a limited fire broke out at the tower during its construction. The fire was extinguished. According to the Saudi Civil Defense, the fire did not result in any injuries or damage. The building was later completed in 2017. It was inaugurated by Riyadh Governor Faisal bin Bandar bin Abdulaziz Al Saud on April 23, 2019.

== Design ==
The building was designed by Skidmore, Owings and Merrill architectural firm, known for their work on the Burj Khalifa, and RSP Architects Planners & Engineers, a Singapore based architectural firm. When its plan was unveiled to the public in 2006, the building was originally designed by architects from Atkins as a 50-floor, 352-metre (1,155 ft) tall skyscraper, featuring a pyramid shape and a helipad.
