= Rafal Tower =

Hotel in Riyadh, Saudi Arabia

Burj Rafal
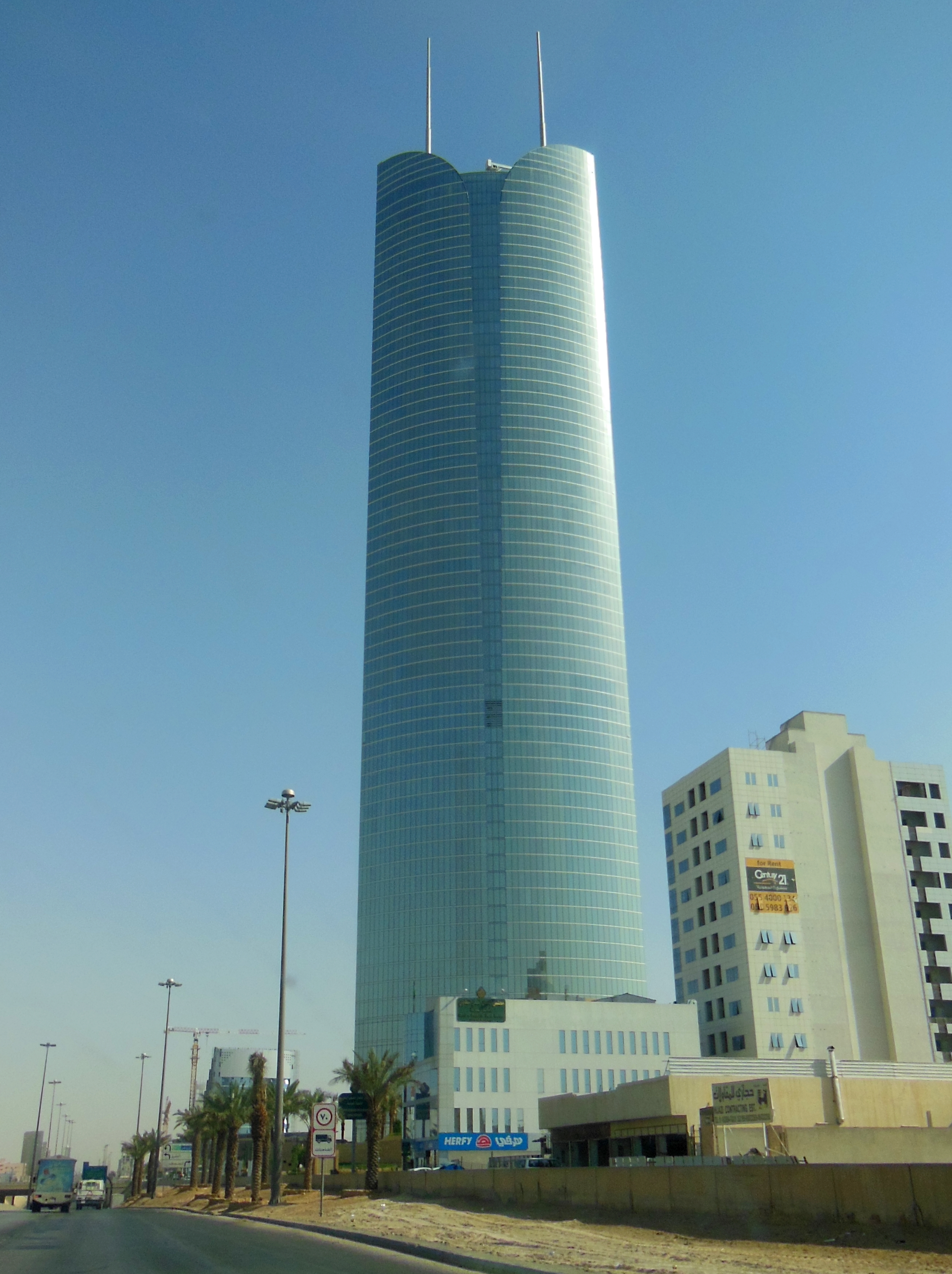

General information
- Type: Mixed use; Residential, Commercial Office, Hotel, Serviced Apartments
- Architectural style: Modernism
- Location: Riyadh, Saudi Arabia
- Coordinates: 24°47′32″N 46°37′56″E
- Construction started: May 2011
- Completed: 2014
- Opening: June 2013
- Operator: Stefan Kaminski

Height
- Roof: 308 m (1,010 ft)

Technical details
- Structural system: Concrete and Steel, Glass façade
- Floor count: 70 total floors with 68 above ground and 2 below ground and about 17 floors with hotel rooms

Design and construction
- Architect: P&T Group

Rafal Tower or Burj Rafal (Arabic: برج رافال) is a skyscraper hotel in Riyadh, Saudi Arabia. It opened in January 2014, its 70 floors constructed on an exclusive 20,000 sqm plot.

== About ==
The skyscraper has about 350 rooms and is the tallest residential building in Riyadh. It is also one of the tallest hotels in the world. The building had a total cost of about $320 million.

== Design ==
Burj Rafal's design incorporates a glass façade complemented by local stone cladding on the podium, reflecting a contemporary interpretation of local architectural traditions. The tower's structural system utilizes concrete and steel, ensuring stability and resilience. Sustainability features include energy-efficient systems, occupancy-based lighting controls, and the reuse of condensate water from air conditioning systems for irrigation.

== See also ==
- List of tallest buildings in Saudi Arabia
