= King Road Tower =

Coordinates: 21.5591°N 39.1249°E

- برج طريق الملك
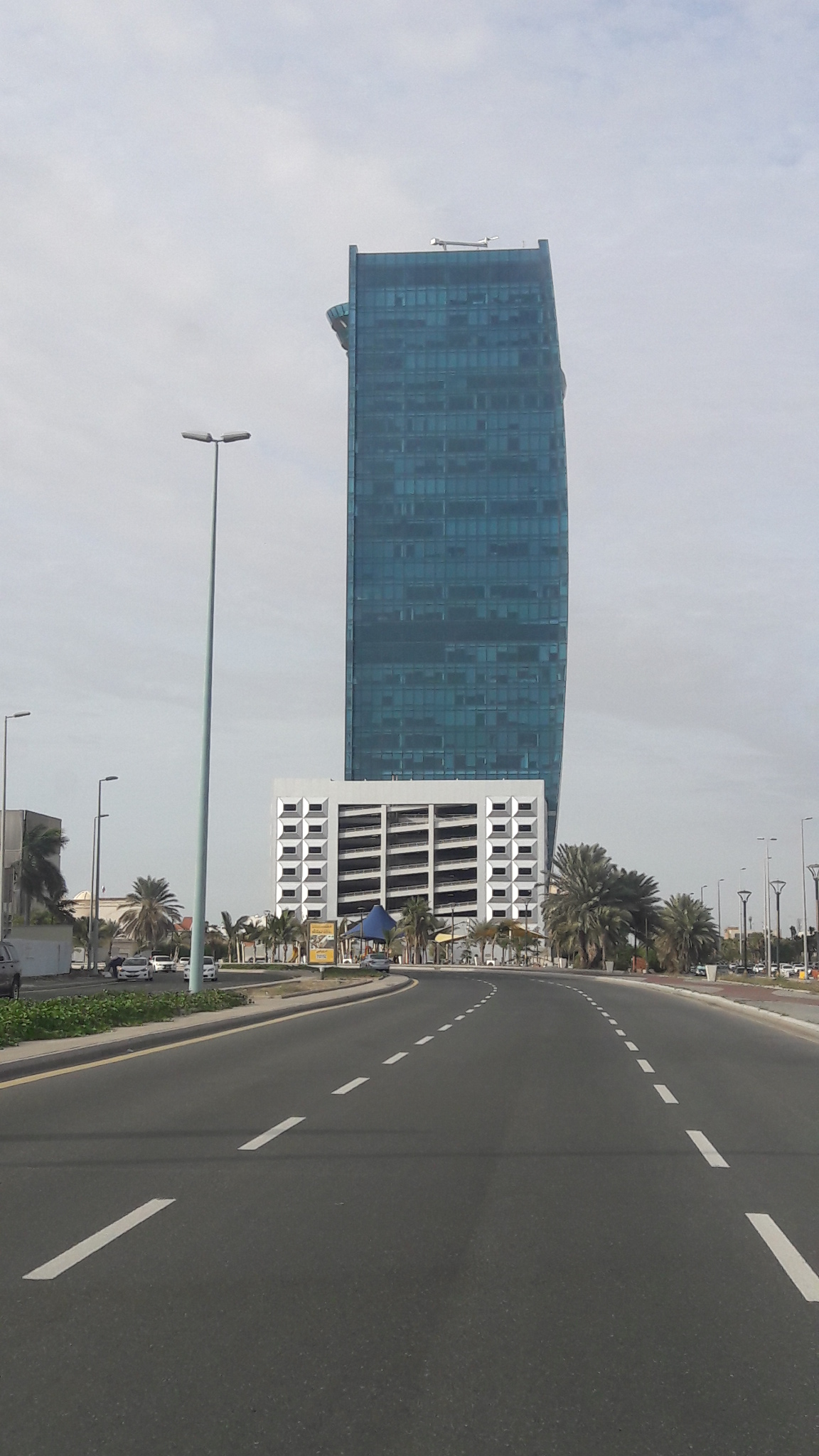

General information
- Status: Completed
- Type: offices
- Architectural style: skyscraper
- Location: Jeddah, Saudi Arabia
- Estimated completion: 2011
- Opening: 2011

Technical details
- Structural system: Reinforced concrete and steel, all glass façade
- Floor count: 37 total
- Lifts/elevators: 14

King Road Tower is a 34-story office tower that is located in Jeddah, Saudi Arabia. The tower contains the world largest advertisement LED screen, making it a valued landmark for the city. The screen measures almost 10,000 sq m and was designed, built and installed by French company Citiled, a world leader in tailor-made "Media Façade" projects for integration into architecture.

Citiled was the company chosen by the project initiators in view of their expertise and their prestigious past achievements (e.g. the Agbar Tower designed by architect Jean Nouvel in Barcelona, the Hermes Building in Singapore, the Cocor luxury shopping centre in Bucharest, etc.).

21 floors on the north and south façades and 16 floors on the west façade have been equipped with LED screens developed by Citiled, i.e. a total of 9,850 sq m and more than 5 million LEDs, making this structure the largest Media Façade in the world installed on an inhabited building.

It took more than 6 months to produce the 10,000 sq metres of this media façade, occupying a team of around twenty engineers and craftsmen for three months during the project design phase and then 6 months for installation and testing.

Citiled uses patented technological innovations and was able to develop and implement systems that are almost transparent when mounted on the façades, guaranteeing daylight for the building's occupants and preserving visibility.

The project's main contractor was FADEN and MEP sub-contractor TECHNO - Technical Electromechanical Works Co. Ltd.

.

== Gallery ==
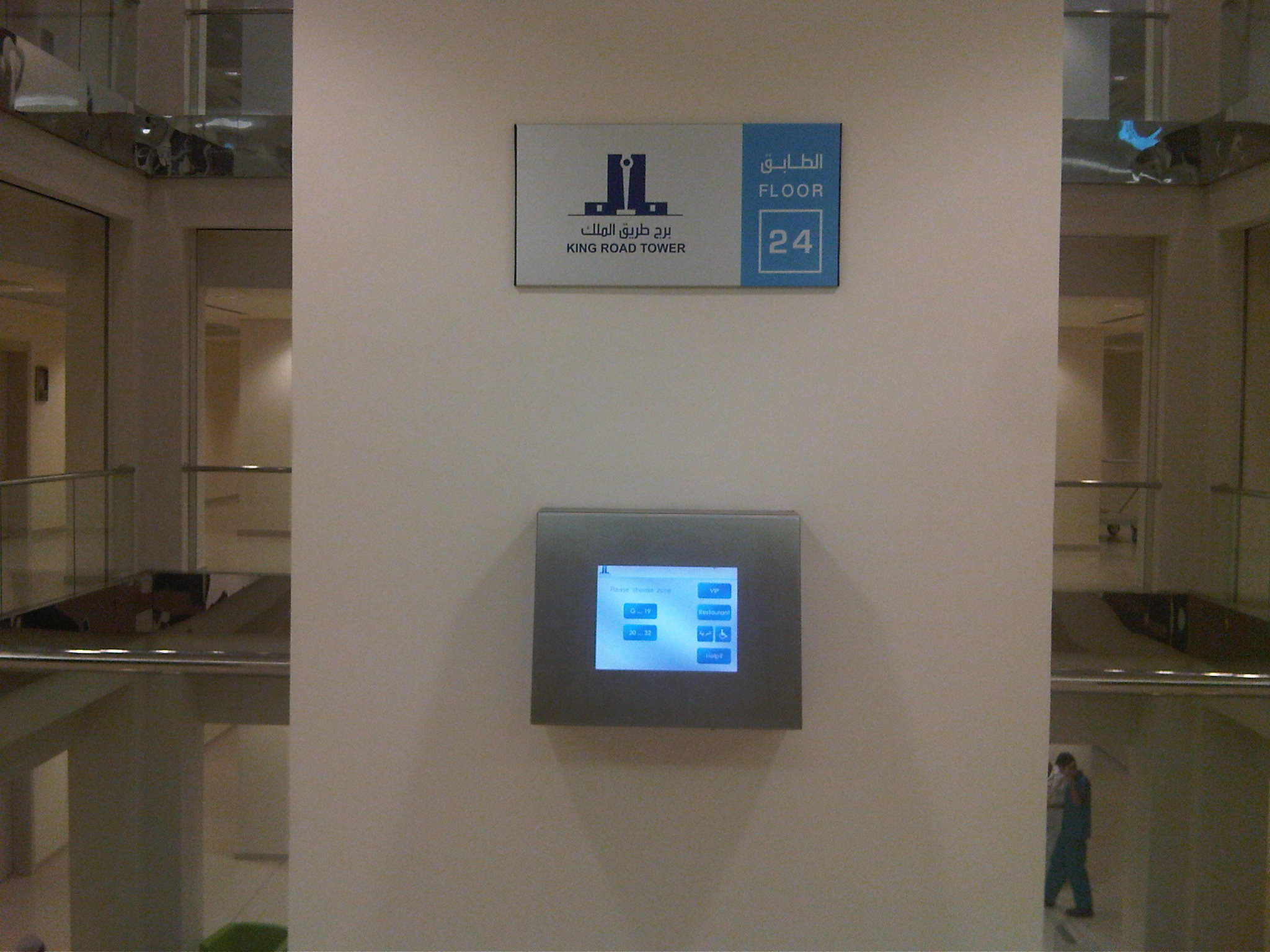
The smart elevator system uses a touch screen to call the elevators.

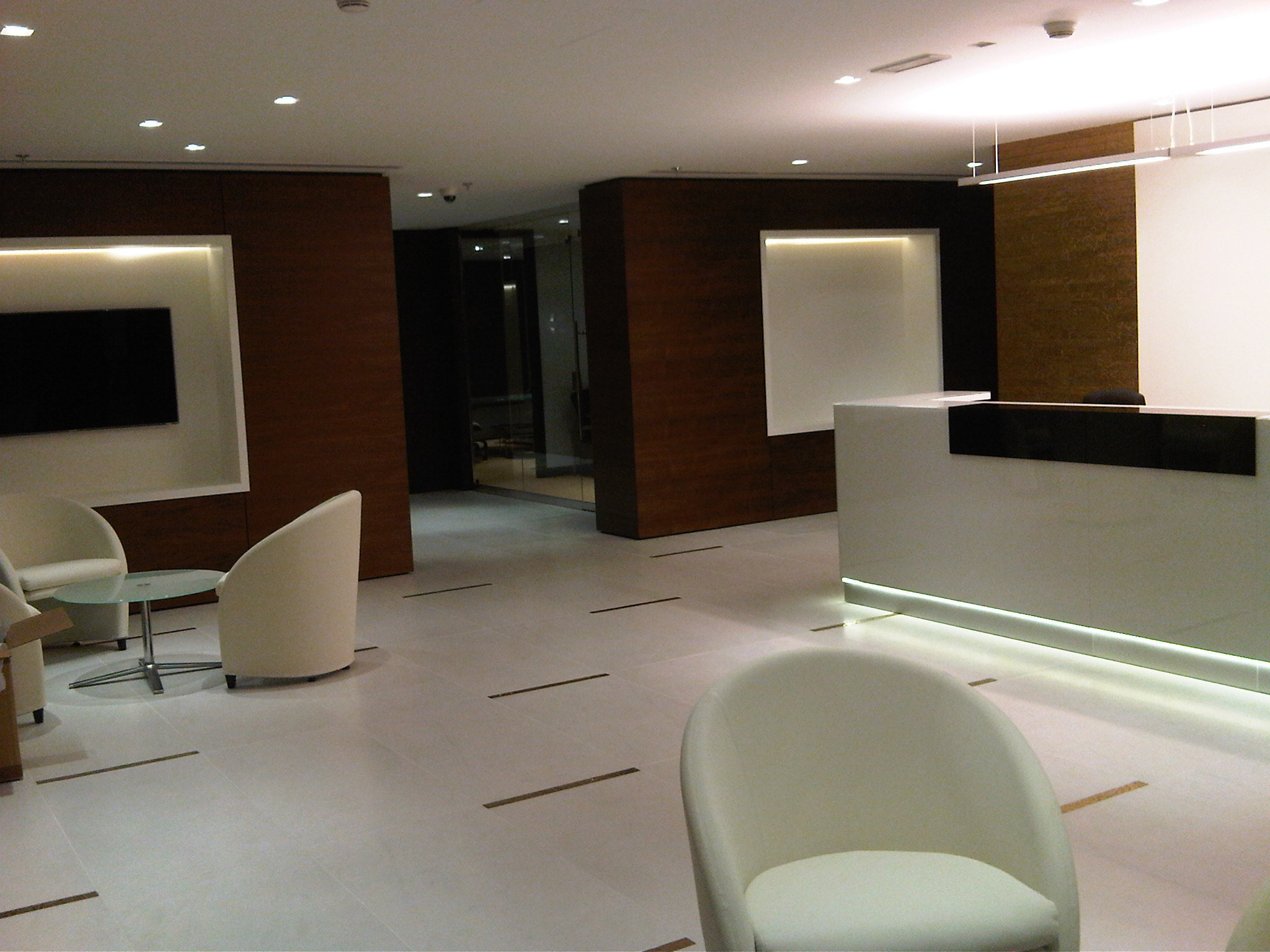
An office reception inside the tower.

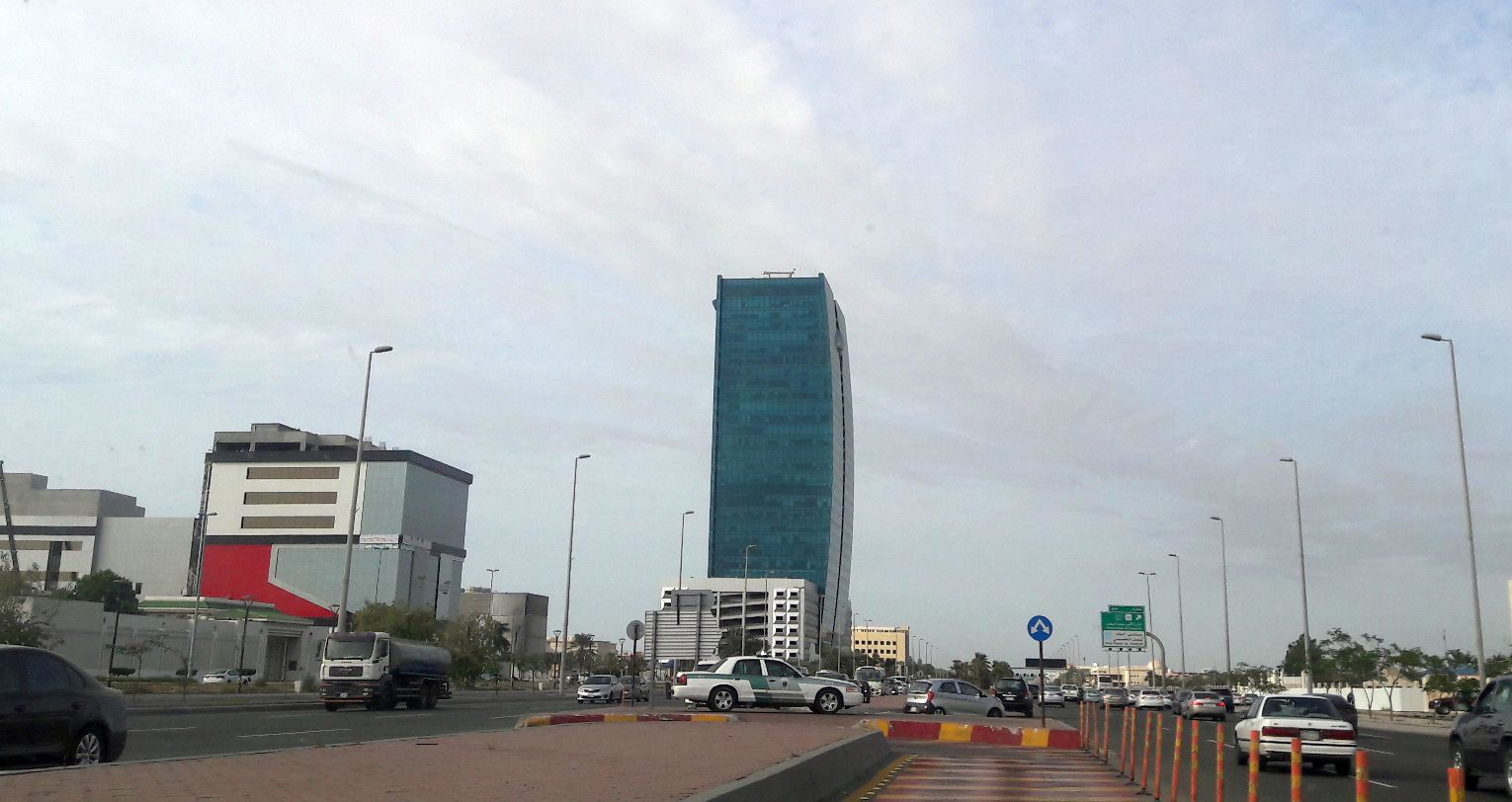
