= Al Faisaliah Tower =

Skyscraper in Riyadh, Saudi Arabia

Al-Faisaliah Tower
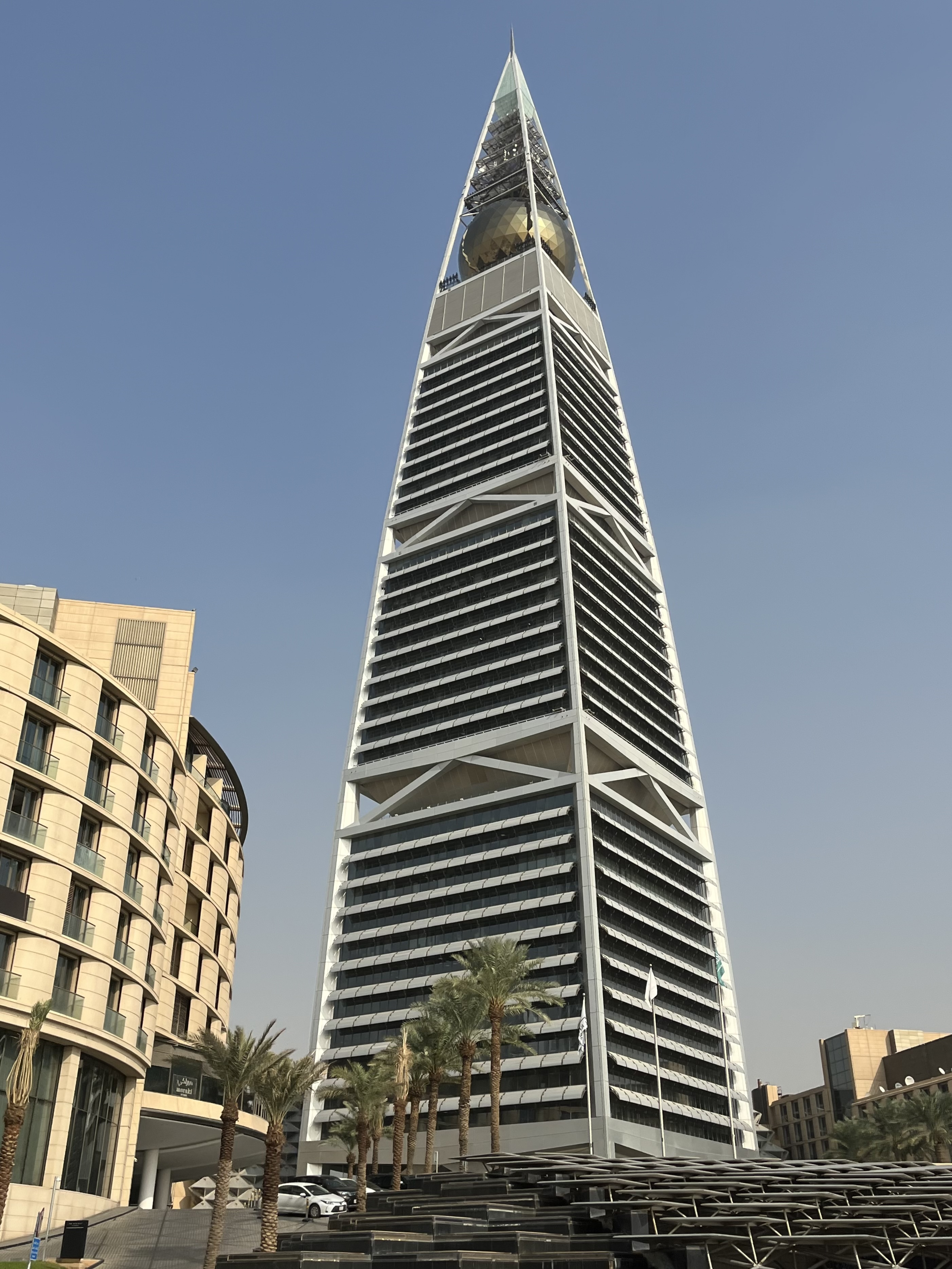
- Al-Faisaliah Tower and Mandarin Oriental (left), 2023

Record height
- Tallest in Saudi Arabia from 2000 to 2002^{[I]}
- Preceded by: Riyadh TV Tower
- Surpassed by: Kingdom Centre

General information
- Status: Completed
- Type: Mixed-use
- Architectural style: Neo-futurism
- Location: Riyadh, Saudi Arabia
- Coordinates: 24°41′25″N 46°41′07″E
- Named for: King Faisal
- Construction started: 4 March 1997; 29 years ago
- Completed: 14 May 2000; 26 years ago
- Owner: King Faisal Foundation

Height
- Roof: 267 m (876 ft)
- Top floor: 195 m (640 ft)

Technical details
- Floor count: 44

Design and construction
- Architect: Foster + Partners
- Main contractor: Saudi Binladin Group

Al-Faisaliah Tower (Arabic: برج الفيصلية) is a 267-metre-high commercial skyscraper and mixed-use complex located in the Al-Olaya district of Riyadh, Saudi Arabia. Designed by Foster + Partners, the tower is the centerpiece of the Al-Faisaliah Center development. The building's design was inspired by the form of the Umar ibn al-Khattab Mosque in Al-Jouf Province, and its lobby contains a stained-glass installation created by architectural artist Brian Clarke in collaboration with Norman Foster.

Completed in 2000, Al-Faisaliah Tower was the first skyscraper built in Saudi Arabia. It was the tallest building in the country between 2000 and 2002. The tower is named after King Faisal bin Abdulaziz. At one point, it was ranked as the world's 325th tallest building.

== History and structure ==
First appointed to the architectural practice Foster + Partners in 1994, the complex was commissioned by Abdullah Al-Faisal, with construction begun in 1997. The complex is made up of the central office tower, a five-star hotel, a three-storey retail mall, and a banqueting and conference hall. The skyscraper comprises 30 floors of office space, above which, at 200 metres above ground level, an observation deck provides a panoramic view of Riyadh. The 240,000-square-metre Centre was completed in May 2000, with the skyscraper opened to the public in the same month. The skyscraper, also called the Star Dome, contains one of Saudi Arabia's premier restaurants, "The Globe", located in the sphere above the observation deck, possessing 360-degree views of the city.

=== Stained glass ===
In 1999, the artist Brian Clarke, who had formerly collaborated with Norman Foster on architectural art proposals for London Stansted and Hong Kong airports, was commissioned to design a 22,000 sq. ft. wall of glass for the modular atrial space connecting the complex's hotel, north of the tower's base, and the tower's residential and retail developments. Clarke's initial designs for the project, produced in 1994 and incorporating traditionally-leaded stained glass and an interrelated glass mosaic floor for what was then known as 'The Link Building', developed in tandem with the architect's resolution of the complex, and were resolved as an integral, five-storey-high glass art 'skin', considered a landmark development in the history of stained glass.

== Gallery ==
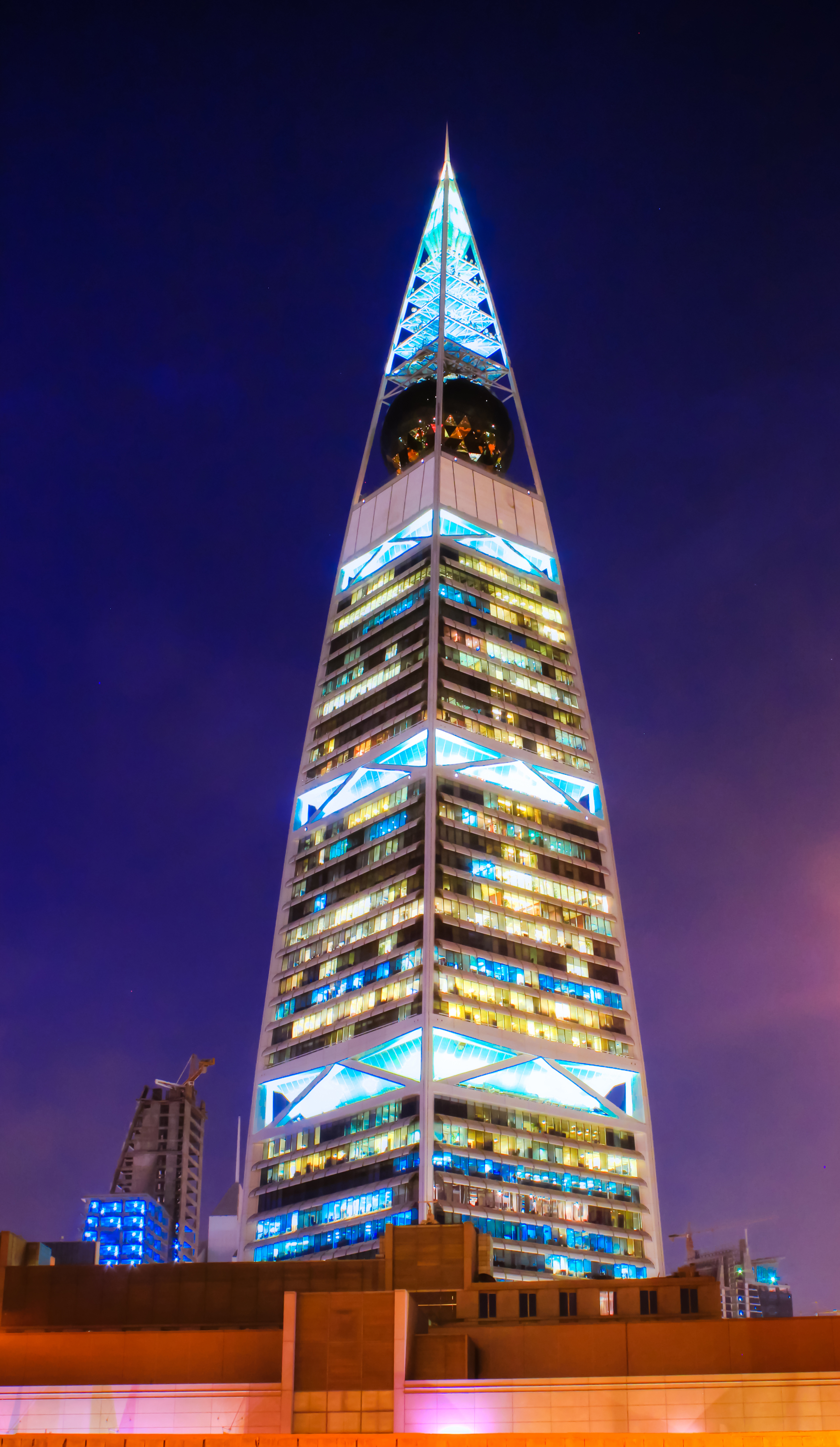
Al Faisaliah Tower at night

== See also ==
- List of tallest buildings
- List of tallest buildings in Asia
- List of tallest buildings in Saudi Arabia
- List of tallest structures in the Middle East

Records
Preceded by Riyadh TV Tower	Tallest building in Saudi Arabia; 2000–2002; 267 metres (876 ft)	Succeeded by Kingdom Centre
