= Riyadh Water Tower =

- برج مياه الرياض
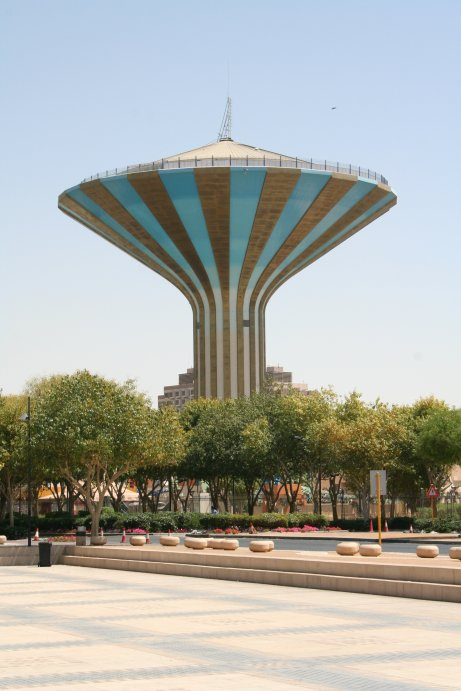
- Riyadh Water Tower viewed from the Murabba Square, 2007
- Interactive map of the Riyadh Water Tower area
- Alternative names: Burj al-Khazzaan; Khazzaan Murabba

Record height
- Tallest in Saudi Arabia from 1971 to 1982^{[I]}
- Surpassed by: Riyadh TV Tower

General information
- Type: Water tower
- Location: King Faisal Road, King Abdul Aziz Historical Centre, al-Fouta, Riyadh, Saudi Arabia
- Coordinates: 24°38′42″N 46°42′44″E
- Construction started: 1969
- Completed: 1971

Height
- Height: 61 meters

Technical details
- Structural system: standard reinforced concrete, prestressed concrete

Design and construction
- Architect: Sune Lindström
- Main contractor: AB Vattenbyggnadsbyrån

Riyadh Water Tower (Arabic: برج مياه الرياض), locally known as Burj al-Khazzaan (Arabic: برج الخزان, lit. 'the reservoir tower') or simply al-Khazzaan (Arabic: الخزان, lit. 'the reservoir'), is a 61-meters tall conical-shaped cylindrical water tower and a prominent cultural landmark in the al-Futah neighborhood of Riyadh, Saudi Arabia. Designed by Swedish architect Sune Lindström and modeled after the Svampen water tower in Örebro, Sweden, it was the tallest structure in the country at the time of its inauguration in 1971 and is today located within the precincts of al-Watan Park in the King Abdulaziz Historical Center. The famous Khazan Street in the city is named after the water tower.

== Overview and background ==
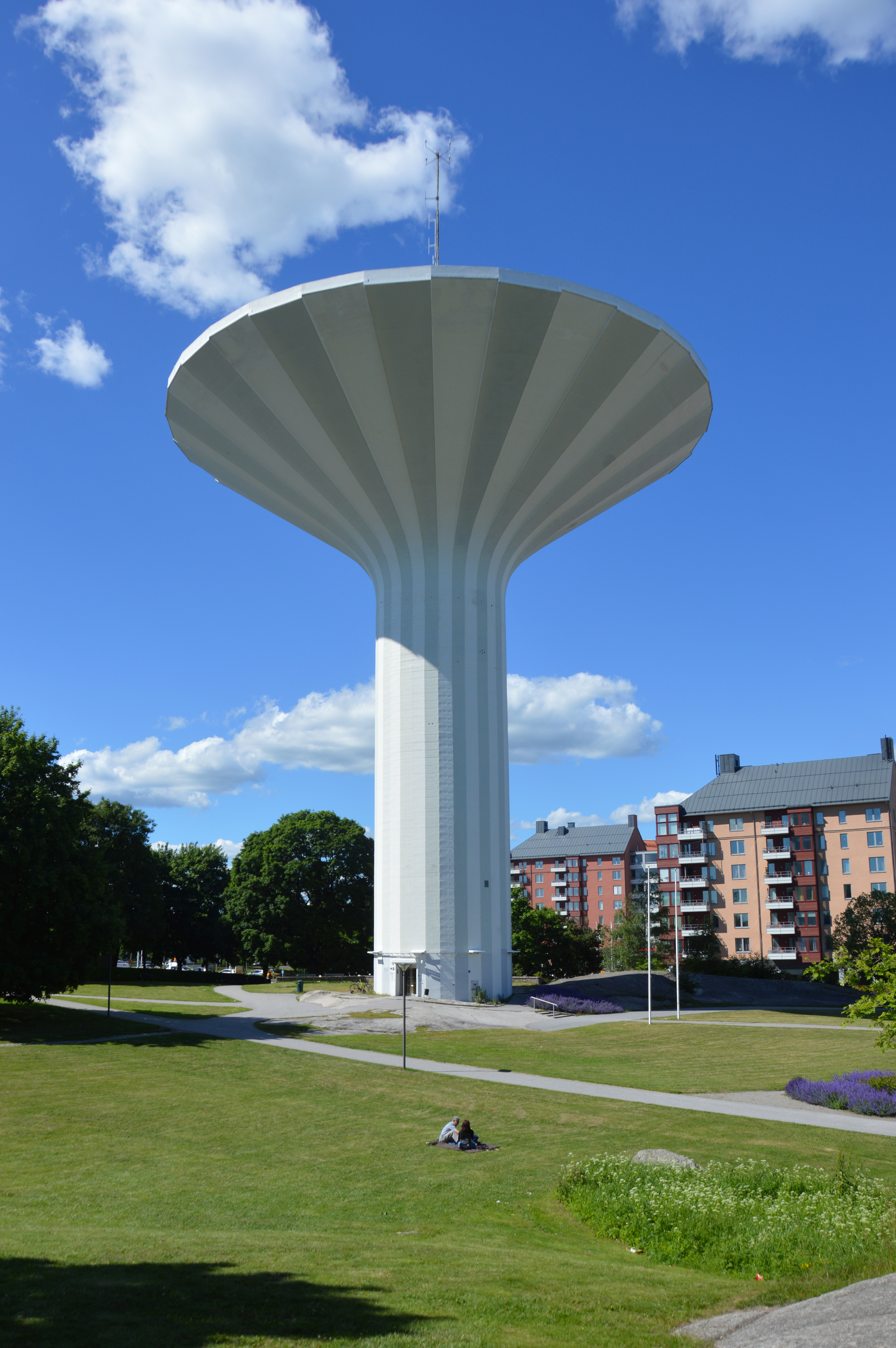
Svampen water tower in Örebro, Sweden, which the Riyadh Water Tower was modeled after

As Riyadh underwent unprecedented expansion and modernization during the 1960s and 1970s, the city lacked a water-supply network to fulfil the needs of its residents. The then Saudi government led by King Faisal tasked the agriculture ministry to come up with a solution by constructing a water tower. The ministry later gave the project to a Swedish architect Sune Lindström in 1969 who worked for the now defunct Stockholm-based Vattenbyggnadsbyrån (VBB) engineering company (later acquired by Sweco in 1997) to develop and implement a plan for a modern water-supply system for Riyadh. Lindström and VBB had simultaneously been employed by the Kuwaiti government as well for the design and construction of the Kuwait Water Towers.

The ministry chose the site upon the ruins of a demolished casino located in close proximity of the Murabba Palace compound for the construction of the water tower to cater the needs of neighborhoods in the vicinity like al-Malazz, Manfuhah and Shumaisi.

The tower contains two tanks, the first one has a filling capacity of 12,000 cubic meters, with the highest water level reaching 51 meters above the ground. The second one has a filling capacity of 350 cubic meters for emergency use during extreme shortages.

It was repainted in 1997 during the reign of King Fahd to observe the upcoming hundredth anniversary of the 1902 Battle of Riyadh.
