= King Abdulaziz Mosque (Riyadh) =

Mosque in al-Murabba, Riyadh, Saudi Arabia

- جامع الملك عبدالعزيز
- The mosque lit in green prior to the Saudi National Day celebrations, 2024

Religion
- Affiliation: Sunni Islam

Location
- Location: Riyadh, Saudi Arabia
- Interactive map of King Abdulaziz Mosque
- Coordinates: 24°38′44″N 46°42′33″E

Architecture
- Founder: King Abdulaziz ibn Saud
- Completed: 1940s (original); 1998 (restored)

Specifications
- Capacity: 4200
- Minaret: 1
- Site area: 5,540 square metres (1.37 acres)

King Abdulaziz Mosque (Arabic: جامع الملك عبدالعزيز), is a historic Friday mosque in the al-Murabba neighborhood of Riyadh, Saudi Arabia, located next to the Murabba Palace compound and the National Museum Park in the King Abdulaziz Historical Center. Covering an area of 5540 square meters, it was first built around the 1940s, corresponding with the construction of Murabba Palace. The mosque held the funerary prayers for King Faisal bin Abdulaziz following his assassination in 1975 and was later rebuilt by the Royal Commission for Riyadh City in 1998.

== Overview ==
The mosque was built in the 1940s during the reign of King Abdulaziz ibn Saud as part of the construction of the Murabba Palace and served as his place of worship until his death in 1953. In 1975, the mosque held the funerary prayers of King Faisal bin Abdulaziz following his assassination. The funeral was attended by several head of states such as Sheikh Zayed bin Sultan, Yasser Arafat, Hafez al-Assad, Idi Amin, Houari Boumediene, Ahmed Hassan al‐Bakr, Gaafar Nimeiry, Juan Carlos, Anwar Sadat, Mohammad Daoud Khan and Zulfiqar Ali Bhutto.

The mosque was rebuilt in 1998 by the Royal Commission for Riyadh City as part of the King Abdulaziz Historical Center project and covers an area of 5540 square meters. Prominent imams of the mosque have been Sheikh Abdullah bin Qoud, Sheikh Saad bin Faleh and Sheikh Fahd bin Abdul Rahman Al Fahd.

== See also ==
- Islam in Saudi Arabia
- List of mosques in Saudi Arabia
