= King Abdulaziz Foundation for Research and Archives =

Cultural institution in Saudi Arabia

King Abdulaziz Foundation for Research and Archives دارة الملك عبد العزيز
- Location: Al Murabba, King Abdulaziz Historical Center, Riyadh 12631, Saudi Arabia
- Established: 12 September 1972; 53 years ago

Other information
- Website: www.darah.org.sa

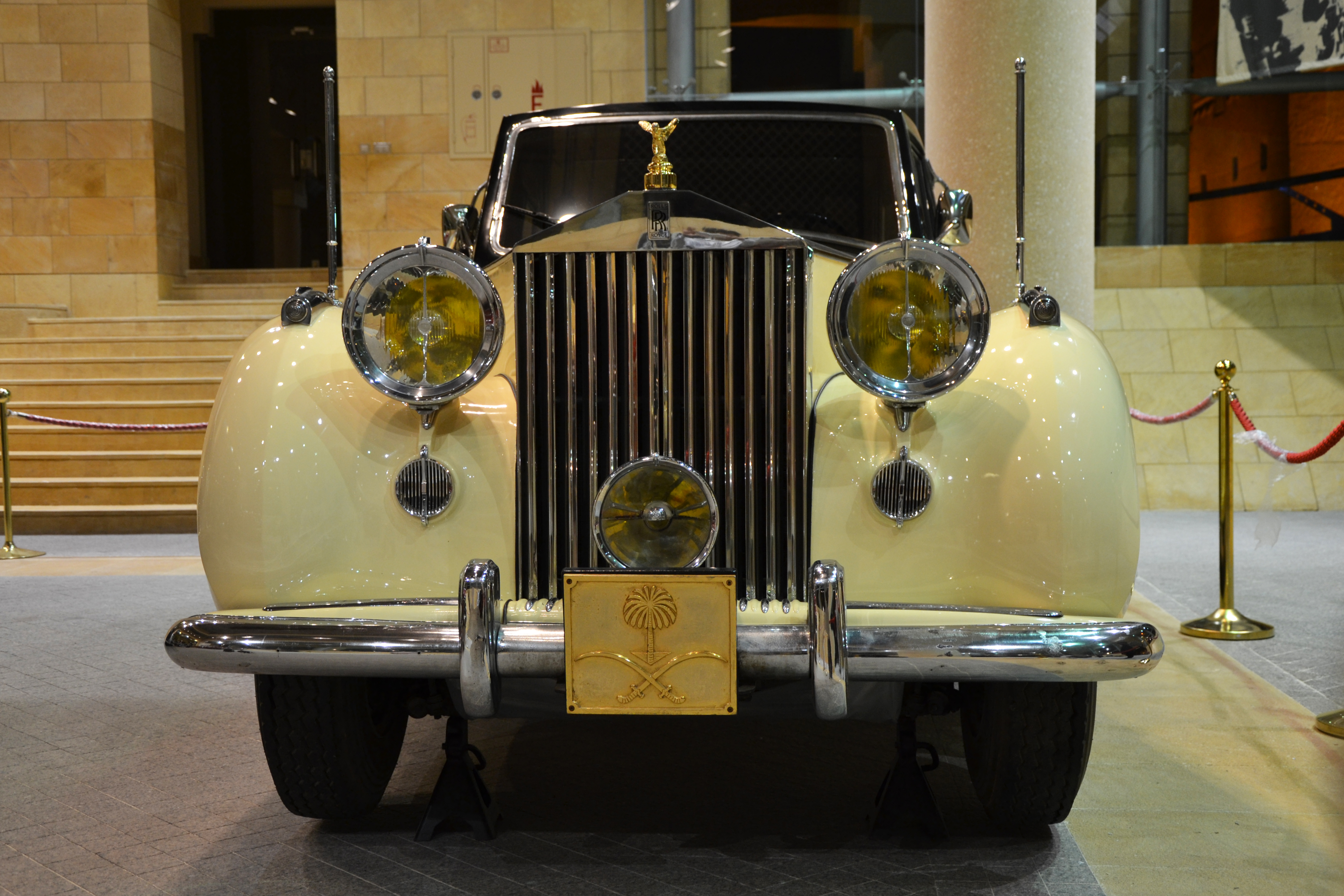
One of King Abdulaziz's vehicles on display at the King Abdulaziz Memorial Hall, 2012

The King Abdulaziz Foundation for Research and Archives (KAFRA) (Arabic: دارة الملك عبد العزيز), commonly known as the Darah, is a cultural institution in the Al Murabba neighborhood of Riyadh, Saudi Arabia. It stands between the Murabba Palace compound and the National Museum and includes the King Abdulaziz Memorial Hall and the King Abdulaziz Private Library. The foundation was established in September 1972 through a royal decree by King Faisal, was later incorporated into the King Abdulaziz Historical Center in 1999.

Its primary role is the collections management and preservation of documents and archives pertaining to King Abdulaziz, the first monarch of Saudi Arabia, his successors and the national history in general.

The chairman of the foundation is Faisal bin Salman Al Saud who was appointed to the post on 12 December 2023.
