= Wahat al-Nakheel =

Municipal garden in al-Fouta, Riyadh, Saudi Arabia

Palm Oasis
- The One Hundred Palm Trees Park
- واحة النخيل
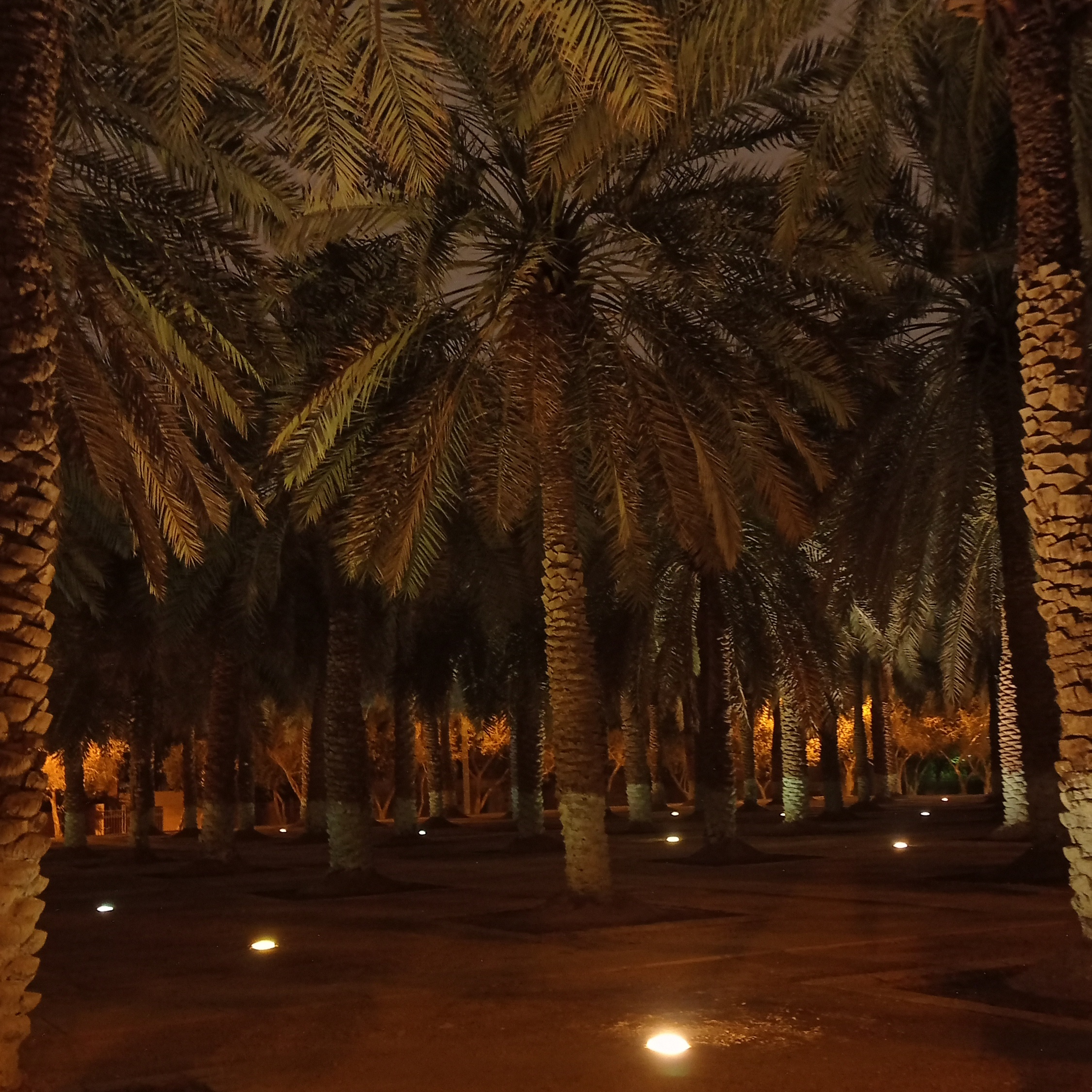
- The Palm Oasis, 2022
- Interactive map of Palm Oasis
- Location: King Saud Road, King Abdulaziz Historical Center, Al Fouta, Riyadh 12631, Saudi Arabia
- Coordinates: 24°38′41″N 46°42′36″E
- Opened: 23 January 1999
- Administrator: Riyadh Municipality

Wahat al-Nakheel (Arabic: واحة النخيل, romanized: al-wāḥat al-naẖīl, lit. 'the Palm Oasis') or One Hundred Palm Trees Park (Arabic: الواحة مائة نخلة, romanized: al-wāḥat miāʾiah naẖlat), is an unfenced municipal garden located between al-Watan Park and al-Yamamah Park in the al-Fouta neighborhood of Riyadh, Saudi Arabia. Inaugurated in 1999, the park is characterized with 100 date palm trees that were planted to commemorate the centenary year of the Battle of Riyadh in 1902 and the subsequent establishment of the Emirate of Riyadh by Ibn Saud. It is one of the eight municipal parks and gardens of the King Abdulaziz Historical Center and is located at the south-center of the compound, overlooking the King Saud Road and the Murabba Square in the National Museum Park.

== Overview ==
The garden is bordered to the al-Watan Park from the east and the al-Yamamah Park from the west. It is situated at King Saud Road and overlooks the Murabba Square in the National Museum Park. The work on the garden began in early May 1997 by the Riyadh Development Authority under the directives of then Riyadh governor Prince Salman ibn Abdulaziz. The Palm Oasis garden was inaugurated in 1999 following the establishment of the King Abdulaziz Historical Center during the reign of King Fahd. The garden was planted with 100 date palms to mark the 100th anniversary of the founding of the Emirate of Riyadh, the first iteration of modern-day Saudi Arabia, following Ibn Saud's victory over the Ottoman-backed Emirate of Ha'il. Ibn Saud's victory in the Battle of Riyadh in 1902 set a prelude to the unification of Saudi Arabia almost thirty years later in 1932.
