= National Museum Park =

Conglomeration of four municipal parks in al-Murabba, Riyadh, Saudi Arabia

- حديقة المتحف الوطني
- Murabba Square with National Museum in the background, 2022
- Interactive map of National Museum Park
- Location: King Saud Road, Al Murabba, Riyadh 12631, Saudi Arabia
- Coordinates: 24°38′41″N 46°42′36″E
- Area: 5 acres
- Established: 1999; 27 years ago
- Administrator: Riyadh Municipality

The National Museum Park (Arabic: حديقة المتحف الوطني) is an umbrella term used for the agglomeration of 5 out of 8 municipal parks and gardens in the al-Murabba neighborhood of Riyadh, Saudi Arabia, namely al-Haras, al-Soor, al-Wadi, al-Jisr and al-Madi that adjoin the Murabba Palace compound and the premises of National Museum as well as the King Abdulaziz Foundation for Research and Archives in northern section of the King Abdulaziz Historical Center.

They are a popular tourist attraction among locals as an outdoor recreational spot and gets flocked mostly by families during weekends. It was inaugurated in 1999 following the unveiling of the King Abdulaziz Historical Center by King Fahd to commemorate the centenary of the Battle of Riyadh in 1902 and the subsequent establishment of the Emirate of Riyadh by Abdulaziz ibn Saud that set the prelude to the unification of Saudi Arabia almost thirty years later in 1932.

== Overview ==
The National Museum Park encompasses almost five municipal parks and gardens, that include al-Haras Park, al-Soor Park, al-Wadi Park, al-Jisr Park and al-Madi Park.

=== Al-Haras Park and al-Soor Park ===
Al-Haras Park and al-Soor Park altogether constitute the northwestern strip of the King Abdulaziz Historical Center, located in the backyard of the Murabba Palace compound and the King Abdulaziz Foundation for Research and Archives as well as the King Abdulaziz Mosque. The park mostly gets crowded by families and is characterized by its rock formations, plants and paved pathways.

==== Al-Haras ====
Al-Haras Park (Arabic: حديقة الحرس, lit. 'the guard garden') is located adjacent to the King Abdulaziz Mosque in the western side of the King Abdulaziz Historical Center. Bordered by King Saud Road from south and Prince Abdullah bin Jalawi bin Turki Street from the west, the park was named al-Haras (Arabic: الحرس, lit. 'the guard') because of the site previously hosting the headquarters of the Saudi Arabian National Guard (SANG) (Arabic: الحرس الوطني, romanized: al-Ḥaras al-Waṭanī). It overlooks the al-Yamamah Park from the north.

==== Al-Soor Park ====
Al-Soor Park (Arabic: حديقة السور, lit. 'the enclosure garden') is located north of al-Haras Park in northwestern section of the King Abdulaziz Historical Center. It is located adjacent to the building of King Abdulaziz Foundation for Research and Archives and overlooks the Prince Abdullah bin Jalawi bin Turki Street from the west and al-Wadi Park from the east.

=== Al-Wadi Park ===
Al-Wadi Park (Arabic: حديقة الوادي, lit. 'the wadi garden') is situated in the northeastern section of the King Abdulaziz Historical Center, adjacent to the building of National Museum. It overlooks the al-Soor Park from the west.

=== Al-Jisr and al-Madi Park ===
Al-Jisr and al-Madi parks altogether form the northeastern strip of the King Abdulaziz Historical Center. They were inaugurated by the then Riyadh governor Prince Salman ibn Abdulaziz in October 2004. The total area of the two parks are almost 30,000 square meters and it overlooks King Faisal Road from the west.

==== Al-Jisr Park ====
Al-Jisr Park (Arabic: حديقة الجسر, lit. 'the bridge garden') is located next to al-Madi Park and has an area of 15,076 square-meters. The park has three gates and derives its name al-Jisr (Arabic: الجسر, lit. 'the bridge') from a 21-meters long and 2.4 meters wide suspension bridge. The park is further characterized by 31,500 shrubs, 228 trees and a green patch of natural grass covering an area of 13,727 square-meters.

==== Al-Madi Park ====
Al-Madi Park (Arabic: حديقة المدي) is located next to the al-Jisr Park. The park is situated on the site that dates back to the 1940s during the reign of King Abdulaziz and was used by the monarch for watering livestock from the wells of the Murabba Palace compound to his subjects. As Riyadh's water-supply system underwent modernization, the site declined in importance and subsequently saw a mosque being built on the site. After the inauguration of the King Abdulaziz Historical Center in 1999, the Riyadh Development Authority began working on the site and rehabilitated it as a municipal park. The park covers an area of 14,790 square meters and is characterized by its wide green area of natural grass that include 567 date palm trees.

== Riyadh Season ==
Owing to its close proximity to the Murabba Palace compound and the National Museum, the park's precincts were chosen as the destination for the al-Murabaa zone by the General Entertainment Authority for the annual Riyadh Season entertainment festival in October 2019 during its inaugural edition and again in the season's 2021 edition. The zone features several seasonal restaurants and cafes with international cuisines that offer culinary traditions from countries like America, Italy, Greece, Japan, Argentina and France.
