= Al Madi Mosque =

Mosque in al-Murabba, Riyadh, Saudi Arabia

Coordinates: 24.6475°N 46.7123°E

- مسجد المدي
- Madi Mosque, 2025

Religion
- Affiliation: Sunni Islam

Location
- Location: Riyadh, Saudi Arabia
- Interactive map of Al Madi Mosque

Architecture
- Completed: 1943 (original); 2004 (restored)
- Demolished: 1998

Specifications
- Capacity: 500
- Dome: 4
- Minaret: 1
- Minaret height: 18 m

Al Madi Mosque (Arabic: مسجد المدي), or Al Medy Mosque, is a historic mosque in the al-Murabba neighborhood of Riyadh, Saudi Arabia, located in the King Abdulaziz Historical Center. Originally built in 1943, it was demolished in 1998 and later rebuilt in 2004 by the Royal Commission for Riyadh City using compressed earth blocks. It covers an area of 457 square meters and was constructed on the site of al-Madi, a large seven column basin used by tribal nomads to water their livestock during the reign of King Abdulaziz ibn Saud.

== Overview ==
The mosque was built in 1943 during the reign of King Abdulaziz ibn Saud and was situated on the site of al-Madi, a large seven column basin used by tribal nomads to water their livestock. In 1998, the mosque was demolished during the King Abdulaziz Historical Center project and later rebuilt in 2004 using compressed earth blocks.

The mosque was inaugurated by Prince Salman bin Abdulaziz in 2004. Covering an area of 457 square meters, it can accommodate 500 worshippers and includes 4 domes. The mosque also includes a minaret, whose height is 18 meters. The mosque is a recipient of the Organization of Islamic Capitals and Cities award.

== See also ==
- Islam in Saudi Arabia
- List of mosques in Saudi Arabia
