= Södra vattentornet =

Water tower in Orebro, Sweden

Coordinates: 59.2620°N 15.1960°E

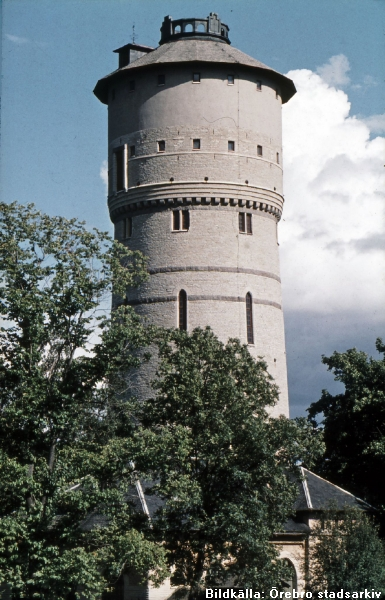
Södra vattentornet in 1957

Södra vattentornet is a water tower in Örebro that was built in 1886 and ended in 1958 along with Norra Vattentornet. It was replaced by Svampen.
