= Laila Alfaddagh =

Saudi Arabian museum curator

- ليلى الفداغ
- Citizenship: Saudi Arabia
- Education: University of Science and Arts of Oklahoma
- Occupation: Museum director
- Employer: National Museum of Saudi Arabia

Laila Alfaddagh (Arabic: ليلى الفداغ) is a Saudi Arabian museum curator, who is Director of the National Museum of Saudi Arabia.

== Biography ==
Alfaddagh graduated with a degree from the University of Science and Arts of Oklahoma in 2006. In 2009 she graduated with an MA in Global Studies from the same institution. In 2010 she began work as a curator at King AbdulAziz Center for World Culture. In May 2017 she was promoted to the role of Head of Museum and Exhibits there. She supported the development of Saudi Arabia's first children's museum, as well as co-founding the Ithra Art Prize. The prize is a partnership with Saudi Aramco. In 2018 she worked on the display of a 250 year old room which had been removed from a house in Damascus in 1978. It had been held in storage, until being shown at the museum for the first time.

In January 2021, Alfaddagh was appointed director of the National Museum of Saudi Arabia. She is expected to lead improvements in visitor experience during her tenure.
