= Al Masmak Palace =

Fort in Riyadh, Saudi Arabia

Coordinates: 24°37′52″N 46°42′48″E

- قصر المصمك
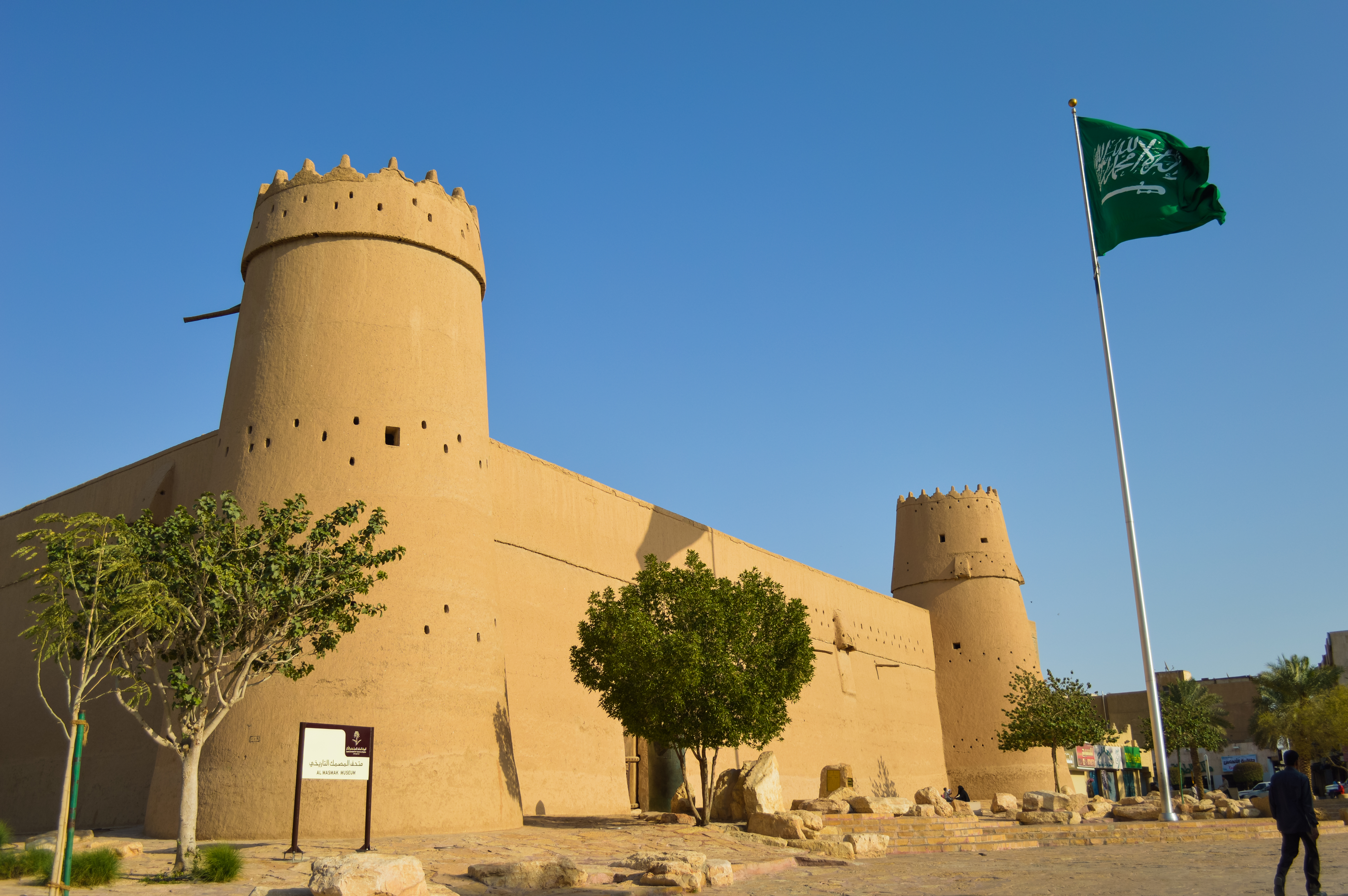
- Entrance to the fortress
- Interactive map of the Al Masmak Palace area
- Alternative names: Masmak Fortress; Masmak Palace

General information
- Architectural style: Najdi architecture
- Location: Qasr al-Masmak, Al Imam Turki ibn Abdullah ibn Muhammad, Dirah, Riyadh 12652, Riyadh, Saudi Arabia
- Construction started: 1865
- Completed: 1895

Al Masmak Palace (Arabic: قصر المصمك, romanized: Qaṣr al-Maṣmak), also called the Masmak Fortress or Masmak Fort, is a historic clay and mudbrick fort in the ad-Dirah neighborhood of Riyadh, Saudi Arabia, located in close proximity to the al-Hukm Palace in the Qasr al-Hukm District. Commissioned in 1865 by Abdullah bin Faisal Al Saud, it was completed in 1895 following the takeover of the town by the Rashidi dynasty. The fortress was the main theatre for the Battle of Riyadh in 1902, which marked the prelude to the unification of Saudi Arabia. It was opened to the general public in 1995 after its conversion into a museum.

== History ==
The construction of the fort was started by Abdullah bin Faisal, Emir of Najd, in 1865. It was completed in 1895 by Emir of Riyadh, 'Abdurrahman ibn Sulaiman under the reign of Muhammad bin Abdullah Al Rashid, the ruler of the Emirate of Jabal Shammar and head of the House of Rasheed, who had wrested control of the city from the local House of Saud, who later went into exile. It was built with four watchtowers and thick walls, with a foundation of stone blocks, lying in the center of Riyadh, in the old city, part of the modern Deira district. It is one of the only historic buildings that has survived in the kingdom. The building was situated in the commercial center of historic Riyadh.

In January 1902, Emir 'Abdulaziz ibn Saud Al Saud, who was at the time living in exile in Kuwait, returned to Riyadh and led an ambush against the Masmak fortress, regaining it from the House of Rasheed in the Battle of Riyadh. The event, which restored Saudi control over Riyadh, is considered one of the most important in the completion of the Unification of Saudi Arabia. It was used as a munitions warehouse from 1902 to 1938 by King Abdulaziz before he moved his court to then newly built Murabba Palace.

In 1979, the Municipality of Riyadh prepared a study for the restoration of the Masmak, following which a renovation of the fortress began. Their vision was realized in 1995 when the Ministry of Education and the Supreme Commission for the Development of Riyadh converted the building into a museum, making it an integral part of Saudi heritage. It was later incorporated into the King Abdulaziz Historical Centre, a series of restored buildings in Riyadh. Centennial celebrations were held in 1999.

=== Al Masmak Palace Museum ===
The Palace Museum displays live photos and information panels of the history of the kingdom, historic maps of Riyadh, antique guns, costumes and agricultural artifacts.

== Architecture ==
The Masmak can be divided into six distinct parts: the gate, the mosque, the majlis, the well, the towers and the courtyard.

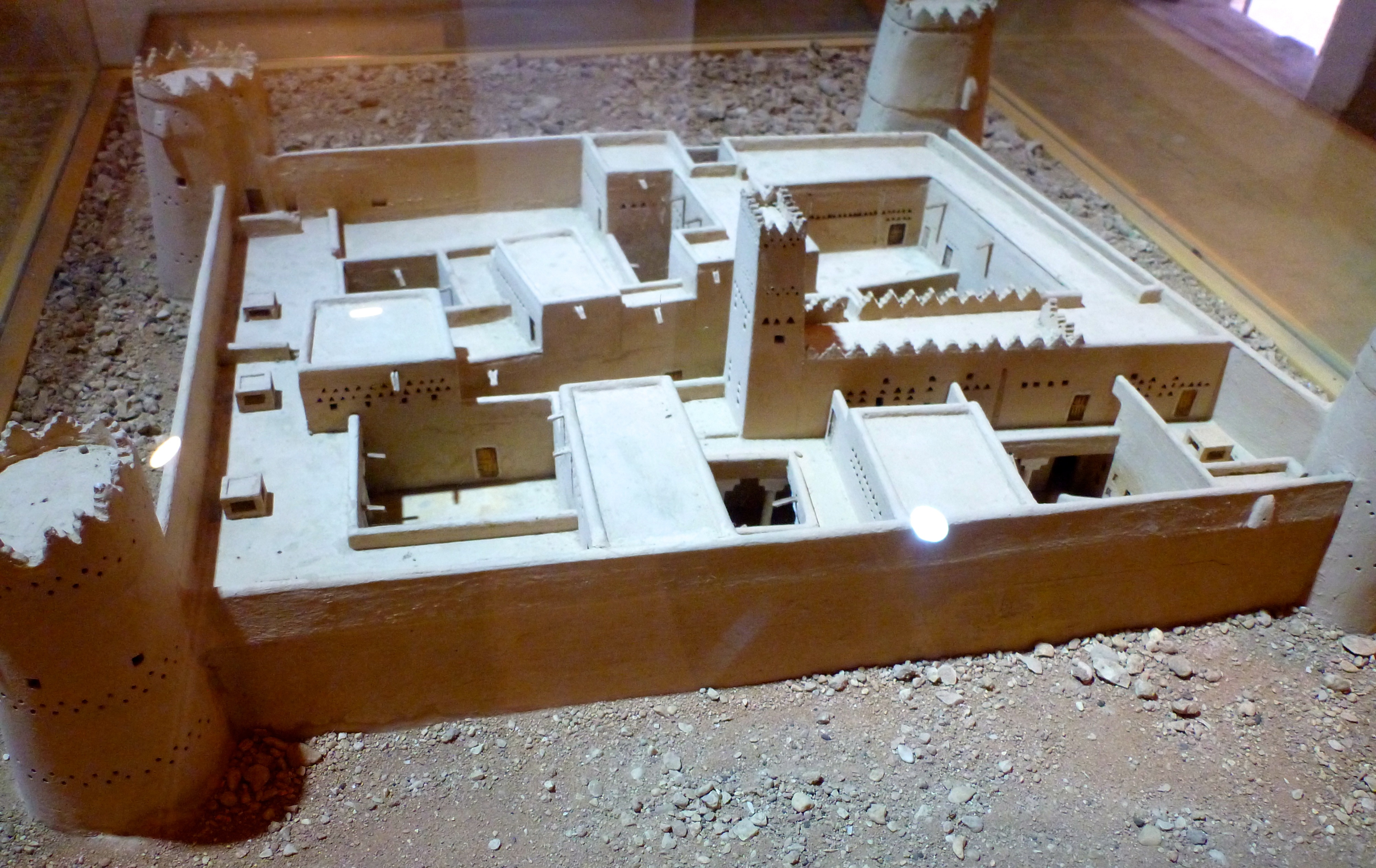
Model of Masmak Citadel

=== Gate ===
The main gate of the palace is located in the western wall, measuring 3.6 m (12 ft) high and 2.65 m (8 ft 8 in) wide. It is 10 cm (3.9 in) thick and is made of palmwood. There is an opening on the center of the door, called al-Khokha, which is just big enough for one person to pass at a time, and is a defensive feature designed to allow people in and out without opening the door.

=== Mosque ===
The mosque is located to the left of the entrance. It is a large room supported by several columns with shelves in the walls for placing mus'hafs of the Quran. A mihrab can be found in the mosque, and there are holes in the walls to provide ventilation.

=== Majlis ===
It is located directly ahead of the entrance and is a room in the shape of a rectangle. On the wall facing the entrance and the southern wall, there are holes in the walls for ventilation and lighting, similar to those found in the mosque.

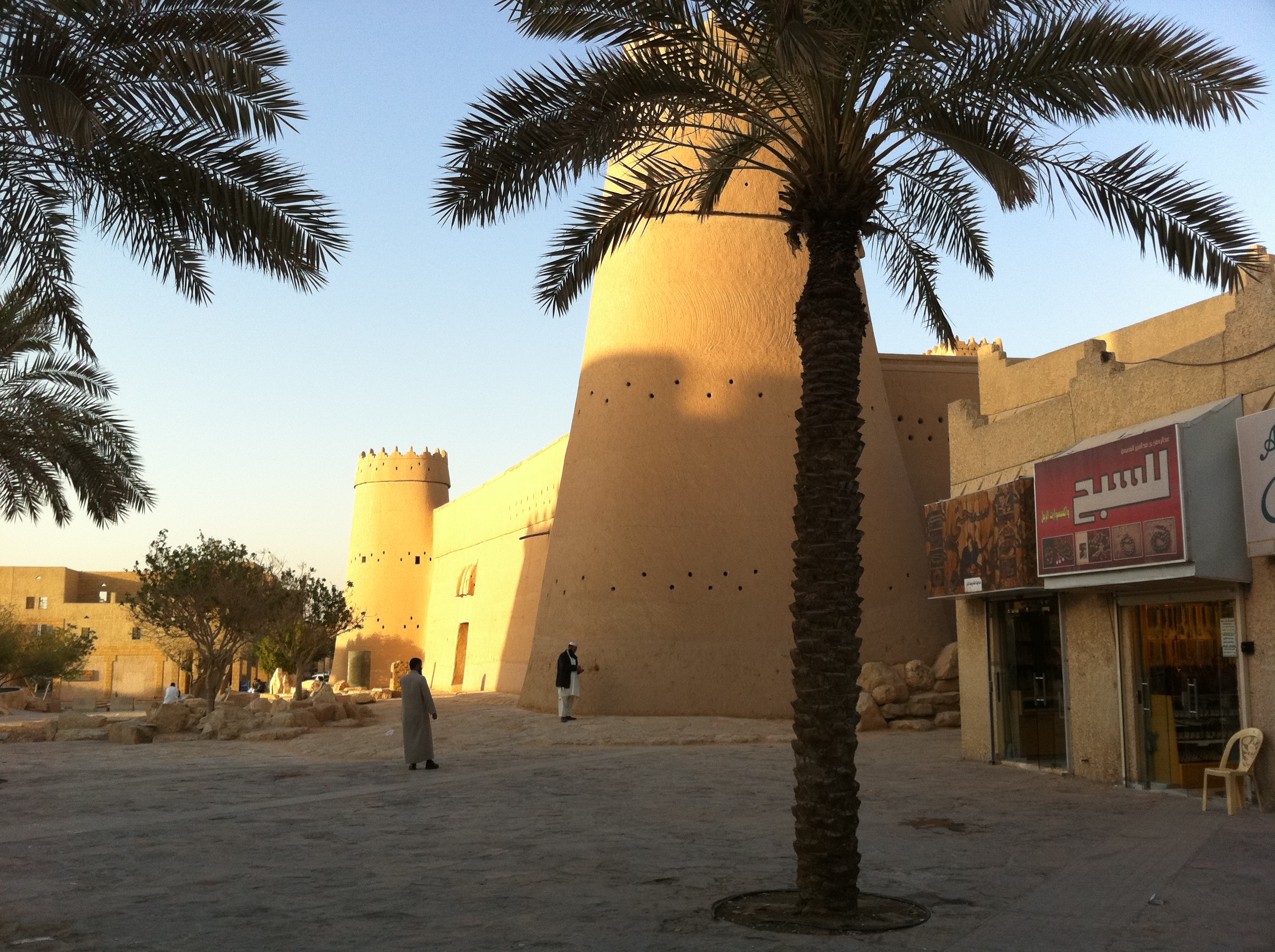
Southwestern tower of the fortress

=== Well ===
The well is located in the northeastern corner of the fortress.

=== Watchtowers ===
In each of the corners of the palace's exterior wall are conical towers, each approximately 18 m (59 ft) high. The towers are accessed through staircases located inside them. The walls of the towers are especially thick, with a thickness of 1.25 m (4 ft 1 in).

=== Courtyard ===
The courtyard is surrounded by rooms with columns connected to each other internally, and it has stairs on the eastern side leading to the first floor and roofs, and there are three residential units, the first served as the residence of the ruler, the second used as a bayt al-mal, and the third was allocated for the accommodation of guests.

== See also ==
- List of museums in Saudi Arabia
- Majlis
