= National Museum of Saudi Arabia =

National History Museum in Riyadh, Saudi Arabia

- المتحف الوطني السعودي

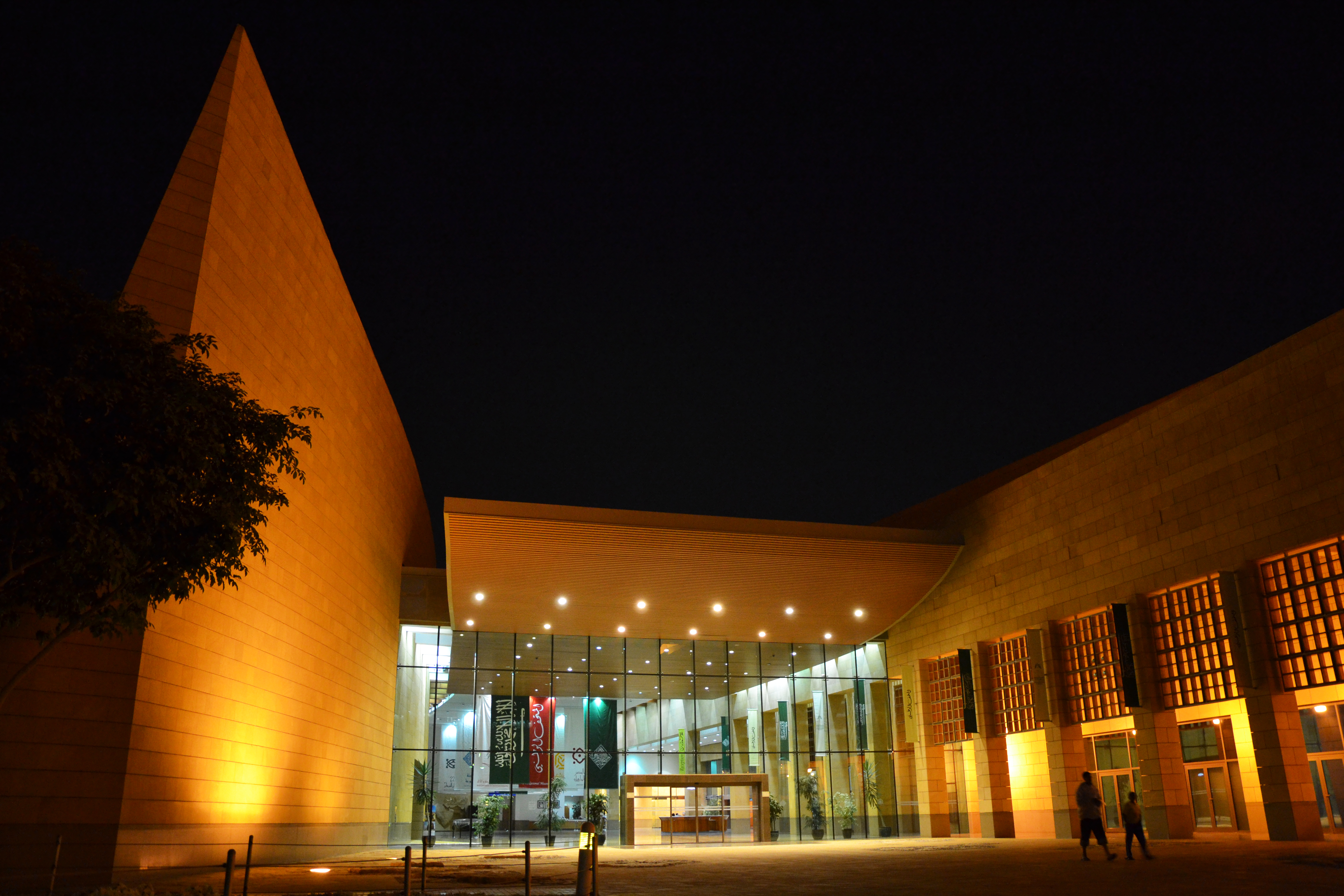
- The National Museum, 2012
- Established: 23 January 1999; 27 years ago
- Location: King Faisal Road, King Abdul Aziz Historical Centre, Riyadh 12631, Saudi Arabia
- Coordinates: 24°38′50″N 46°42′39″E
- Type: National History Museum
- Accreditation: Saudi Commission for Tourism and National Heritage
- Director: Laila Alfaddagh
- Architect: Raymond Moriyama
- Website: engage.moc.gov.sa/national_museum/

The National Museum of Saudi Arabia (Arabic: المتحف الوطني السعودي) is a national museum located in the al-Murabba neighborhood of Riyadh, Saudi Arabia. Established in 1999, it is part of the King Abdulaziz Historical Centre and is surrounded by al-Wadi Park to the north and al-Madi Park to the east, who altogether constitute eastern side of the National Museum Park.

== The building ==
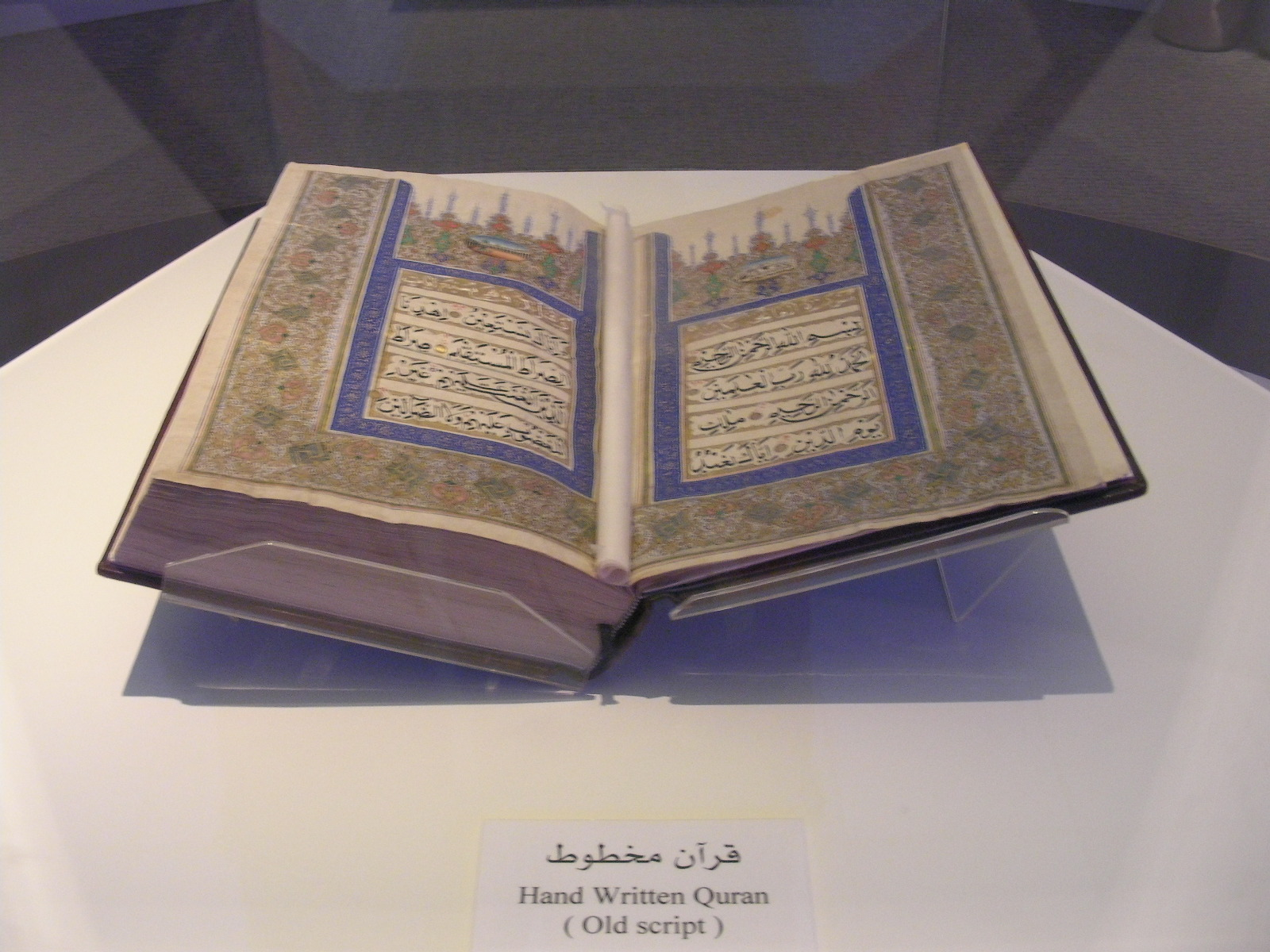
Hand written Quran on display

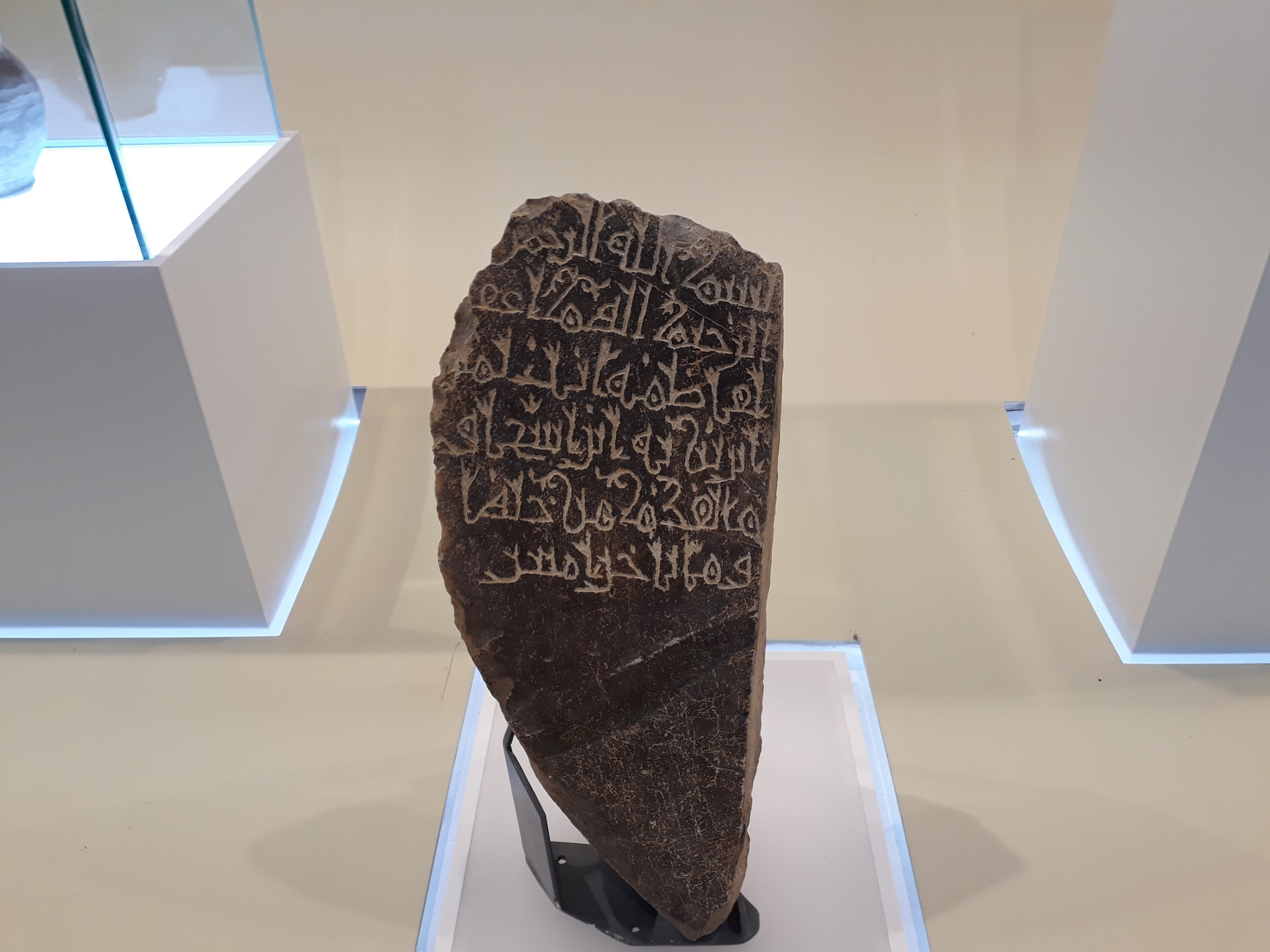
Kufic inscription incised on a rock, 2018

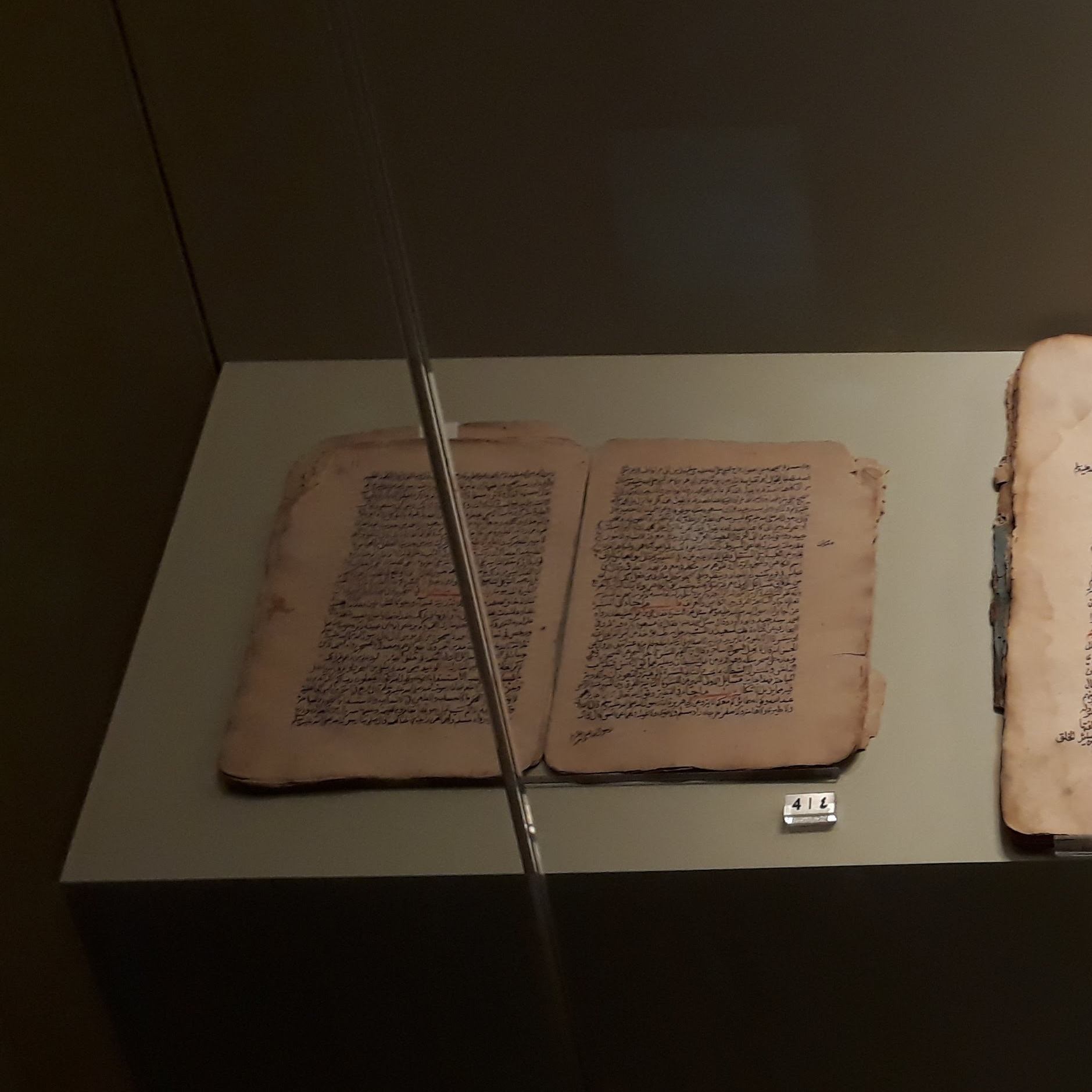
Original corpus of Kitab al-Tawhid (The Book of Monotheism) written by Muhammad Ibn 'Abd al-Wahhab on display, 2018

Original corpus of Kashf al-Shubuhat (Removal of Doubts) written by Muhammad Ibn 'Abd al-Wahhab on display, 2018

The National Museum was part of the "Murabba' Development Plan" to refurbish the area of and around the old Murabba' Palace district for the Centennial Celebrations in Saudi Arabia. Thus the deadline was set to early 1999, leaving only 26 months for the planning and building of the museum from scratch, although ideas for such a museum had been discussed since the eighties. For the design the lead architect Raymond Moriyama was inspired by the form and colors of the sand dunes of the "Red Sands" just outside Riyadh. The west facade along Murabba' Square resembles the soft contour of a sandune with its layout forming a crescent pointing towards Mecca. The west facade opens into an Islamic history of the Arabian Peninsula. For the final galleries the visitor enters the "Unification Drum" which has displays about the current Saudi State. The last gallery illustrates the two holy mosques and the hajj. Additionally there are two further galleries for special exhibitions.

The concept for the didactic design of the exhibitions is somewhat different from the traditional approach of the classic museums. There is less emphasis on individual exhibits displayed out of their cultural context as objects of great value. There are a great many replicas and life size dioramic displays, illustrating and educating about certain points and issues. As such it is sometimes difficult to identify certain specific pieces and even tell replicas from originals. The idea behind this is not to focus on individual pieces in their own right but rather use them as examples to highlight the general ideas or concepts they represent.

=== Halls ===
There are eight halls in the museum:

Hall	Brief overview	Section(s)	Floor
Hall of Man and the Universe	It depicts the life during the very early days of human life and geological changes in the Earth's surfaces which impacted the way of their lives.: It displays a large fragment of a meteorite found at the Wabar craters in the desert of Rub'al Khali; Interactive displays explain the Solar System, plate tectonics, the geology, geography, and development of the flora and fauna in the Arabian Peninsula.; It also exhibits a large skeleton of a Platybelodon and an Ichthyosaur.	1	Ground Floor
Hall of the Arab Kingdoms	The hall shows 14 pre-Islamic Arabian kingdoms existed in the Arabian Peninsula from 5 BC till 700 AD. These are as follows: Obaid (5300 BC - 3600 BC); Dilmun (2400 BC - 1700 BC); ʿĀd (4000 BC - 3500 BC); Thamud (3500 BC - 3000 BC); Midian (1700 BC - 1050 BC); Qedar (10th Century BC); Edom (10th Century BC); Dedom (6th Century BC); Lihyan (5th Century BC); Mai'in (4 BC - 1 BC); Nabatean Kingdom of Kinda (3000 BC); Second Kingdom of Kinda (4 AD); Manadhera (400 AD - 700 AD); Ghassanid (400 AD - 700 AD)	1	Ground Floor
Hall of Pre-Islamic Era	Also known as the Jahilliya Era Hall, it illustrates the lifestyle of the Arabs before the arrival of the Islamic prophet, Muhammad, i.e., before the advent of Islam in the Arabian Peninsula.	1	Ground Floor
Hall of the Prophet's Mission	The hall gives information about Muhammad's family, lineage, birth and migration from Mecca to Medina.	1	First Floor
Hall of Islam and the Arabian Peninsula	The hall portraits the timeline of Arabian Peninsula from the beginning of Islam after the arrival of Muhammad in Medina and till the First World War where the Ottoman Empire was dissolved.	6	First Floor
Hall of the First Saudi State and Second Saudi State	The hall covers the history of establishments of the First Saudi State in 1744 and the Second Saudi State in 1824.	2	First Floor
Unification of the Kingdom Hall	The hall shows the establishment of the Third Saudi State, i.e., modern Kingdom of Saudi Arabia by King Abdul Aziz Al-Saud, a journey which began in 1902 after he captured Riyadh	1	First Floor
Hall of Hajj and Two Holy Mosques	The hall shows the importance of Hajj and Al-Masjid Al-Haram (in Mecca) and Al-Masjid an-Nabwi (in Medina) as well as the role of King Abdul Aziz Al-Saud in the development of those two holy sites.: The hall has three models, one of Makkah Province, Al-Masjid Al-Haram and Al-Masjid an-Nabwi	5	First Floor

== Future expansion projects ==
In June 2018, President of the Saudi Commission for Tourism and National Heritage Prince Sultan bin Salman Al Saud announced the expansion of the museum in the next two months. New services in the museum for the visitors shall be installed, including:

- a 3767 m² exhibition hall
- a 2285 m² theatre
- a 13000 m² 4-star hotel with Saudi Arabian cultural essence
- training rooms
- a 6476 m² restaurant
- a glass roof
- three underground floors

In January 2021, a new museum director, Laila Alfaddagh, was appointed, who is expected to lead the museum into a new phase of engagement with audiences.

== Exhibitions ==
The exhibits are organized in eight "Exhibition Halls" or "Galleries".

- Man and the Universe

The first exhibit encountered in the museum is a large fragment of a meteorite found at the Wabar craters in the desert of the Rub' al Khali. Further exhibits and interactive displays explain the solar system, plate tectonics, the geology and geography of the Arabian Peninsula and the development of the fauna and flora of Arabia. Large exhibits include the skeleton of a Platybelodon and Ichthyosaur. The gallery concludes with stone age man.

- Arabian Kingdoms

This gallery illustrates the early kingdoms, focusing on Dilmon, Madian, Gariah and Tima'a. The exhibition continues with the intermediary Arab kingdoms by showcasing the cities of Al-Hamra, Dawmat Al-Jandal, Tima'a and Tarout. The late Arab kingdoms are represented by the civilizations that thrived in Al-Aflaaj, Najran and Ain Zubaida.

- The Pre-Islamic Era (Jahiliyyah)

This gallery is dedicated to the time from about 400 BCE until the dawn of Islam. Cities of this time portrayed are Makkah, Jarash, Yathrib, Khaibar, Najran, Khadrama, and Dawmat Aljandal, as well as the markets at Okaz, the al-Majaz, Najran and Habasha. The evolution of script and calligraphy is displayed and explained with many examples.

- The Prophet's Mission

Here the life and mission of Mohammad is illustrated. On one wall there is a large family tree explaining Muhammad's family and relations in great detail. From this gallery the visitor has to use a bridge which connects to the next gallery performing a symbolic cross-over from the time of ignorance to the time after the revelation of Islam to Muhammad.

- Islam and the Arabian Peninsula

The time covered in this gallery include the Islamic beginnings in Medinah and the history of the rise and fall of the Caliphate. It also illustrates the time of the Mamluks and the Ottomans up to the First Saudi State.

- First and Second Saudi States

Shown here is the culture and history of the two early Saudi states. A large model of Diriyah is shown under a glass floor, so that it can be examined in great detail.

- The Unification

This gallery is dedicated to King Abdul Aziz and how he regained Riyadh and established his kingdom.

- The Hajj and the Two Holy Mosques

A major exhibit in this gallery is a large model of Makkah and its surroundings.

== See also ==
- List of museums in Saudi Arabia
- Museums in Riyadh
