= King Abdulaziz Historical Center =

Historical compound in Riyadh, Saudi Arabia

- مركز الملك عبدالعزيز التاريخي
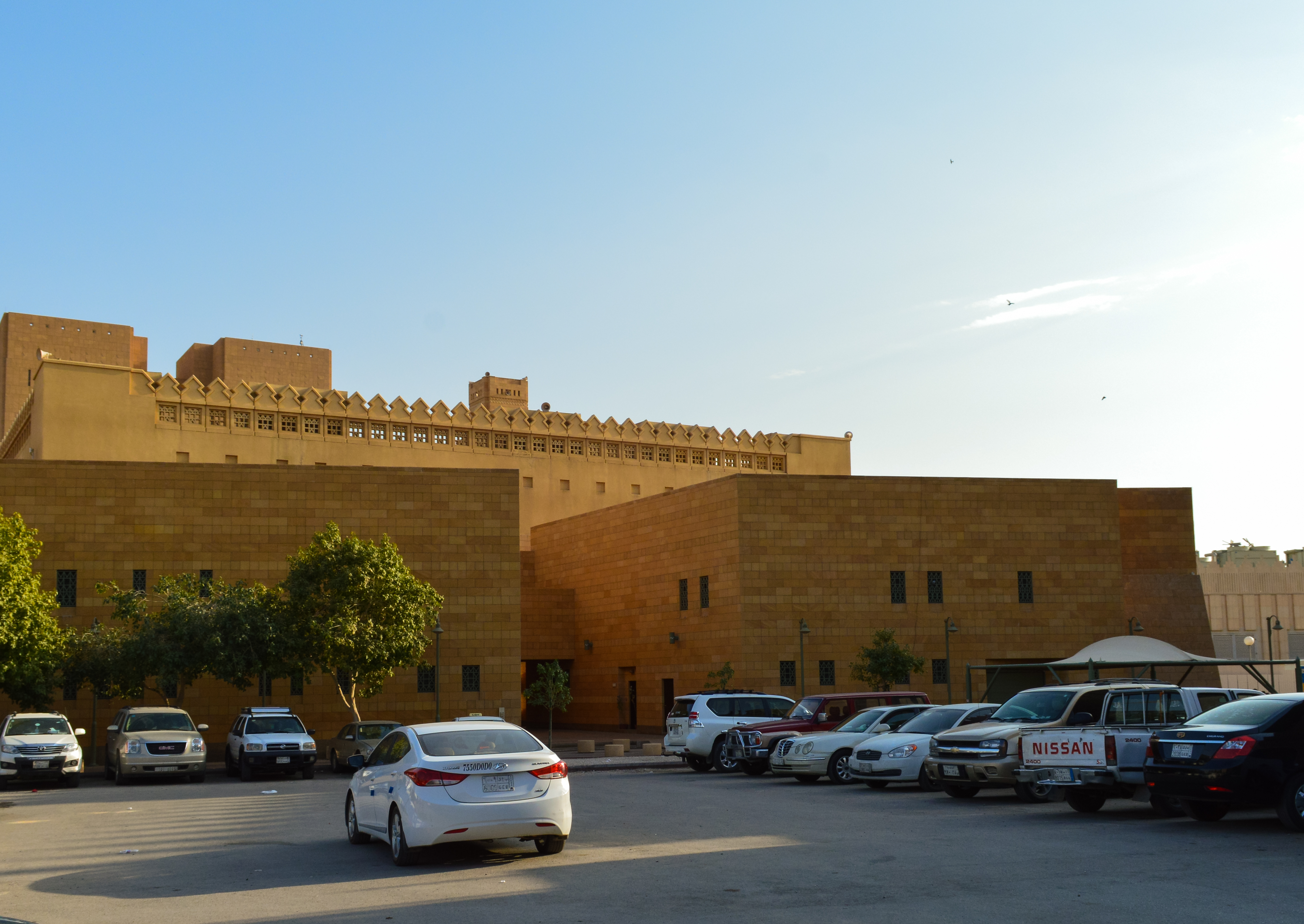
- Established: 23 January 1999; 27 years ago
- Location: Riyadh, Saudi Arabia
- Coordinates: 24°39′N 46°43′E
- Website: www.rcrc.gov.sa/en/projects/kahc
- Location of King Abdulaziz Historical Center

King Abdulaziz Historical Center (KAHC) (Arabic: مركز الملك عبدالعزيز التاريخي) is a cross-district heritage complex in Riyadh, Saudi Arabia, covering south of al-Murabba and north of al-Futah. Inaugurated in 1999, it includes several historic buildings and open green spaces that surround the Murabba Palace compound, which was the main residence and workplace of King Abdulaziz ibn Saud between 1938 and 1953.

It contains the National Museum, King Abdulaziz Foundation, King Abdulaziz Public Library, King Abdulaziz Mosque, King Abdulaziz Auditorium, Al Madi Mosque, Red Palace and Riyadh Water Tower besides six municipal parks and gardens, namely the National Museum Park, al-Watan Park, the Palm Oasis and al-Yamamah Park. It was inaugurated in January 1999 by King Fahd bin Abdulaziz to mark the centenary year of Ibn Saud's takeover of Riyadh in 1902, that paved the way for the establishment of the Emirate of Riyadh, the first iteration of modern Saudi Arabia.

It is not the "historic centre" of the city as this lies to the south around Masmak fort and the main Friday Mosque in the Dira district, known as the Qasr al-Hukm District. The origin of the King Abdul Aziz Historical Centre is the former compound of the Murabba' Palace, which was built in 1936/37 by King Abdul Aziz about 1.5 km to the north of the old city and well outside the then still existing city walls.

After 1953, the palace compound ceased to be used as the main royal residence and slowly fell into disuse. The "Murabba' Development Project" was later started to make use of the area for projects involved with the Centennial Celebrations in 1999. As such the area was chosen to be the site of several cultural institutions focusing on the national history in general and the history of the current Saudi State and its founder in detail. Consequently, what had remained of the old palace compound buildings was restored or remodelled on plans similar to the original buildings. The surrounding area was made into a landscape of parks and plazas and new buildings were built such as the National Museum of Saudi Arabia.

The design of the King Abdulaziz Historical Center reflects the heritage, cultural, and historical identity of Riyadh. Its facilities harmonize with the architectural and urban fabric of the surrounding area. This project is one of the development programs of the High Commission for the Development of Riyadh in the city center, which the Commission began with the multi-phase development of the Qasr al-Hukm area.The center is equipped with all modern facilities and multi-purpose elements that make it a cultural oasis in the heart of the capital of Saudi Arabia.

The units on the west side of the area are from south to north: A remodelled mosque, the old original Murabba' Palace with main Diwan renovated as a "living museum", the "Memorial Hall" on the outlines of an old courtyard house, a modern exhibition hall for the car collection, on the footprints of the old majlis and assembly hall the new Al-Dara main lobby and multipurpose hall, a documentation centre with a separated men's and women's library each, an art gallery and a large internal garden. On the east side the new National Museum of Saudi Arabia was built together with the King Abdul Aziz Foundation for Research and Archives. To the south, the area around the old water tower has been remodelled and now includes a small theme park. The whole project is said to have cost some 680 million Saudi riyals (about 181.33 million U.S. dollars at the time) and covers an area of some 360,000 square meters (3,000,000 sq ft).
