= Svampen =

Water tower in Örebro, Sweden

Coordinates: 59°17′17″N 15°13′31″E

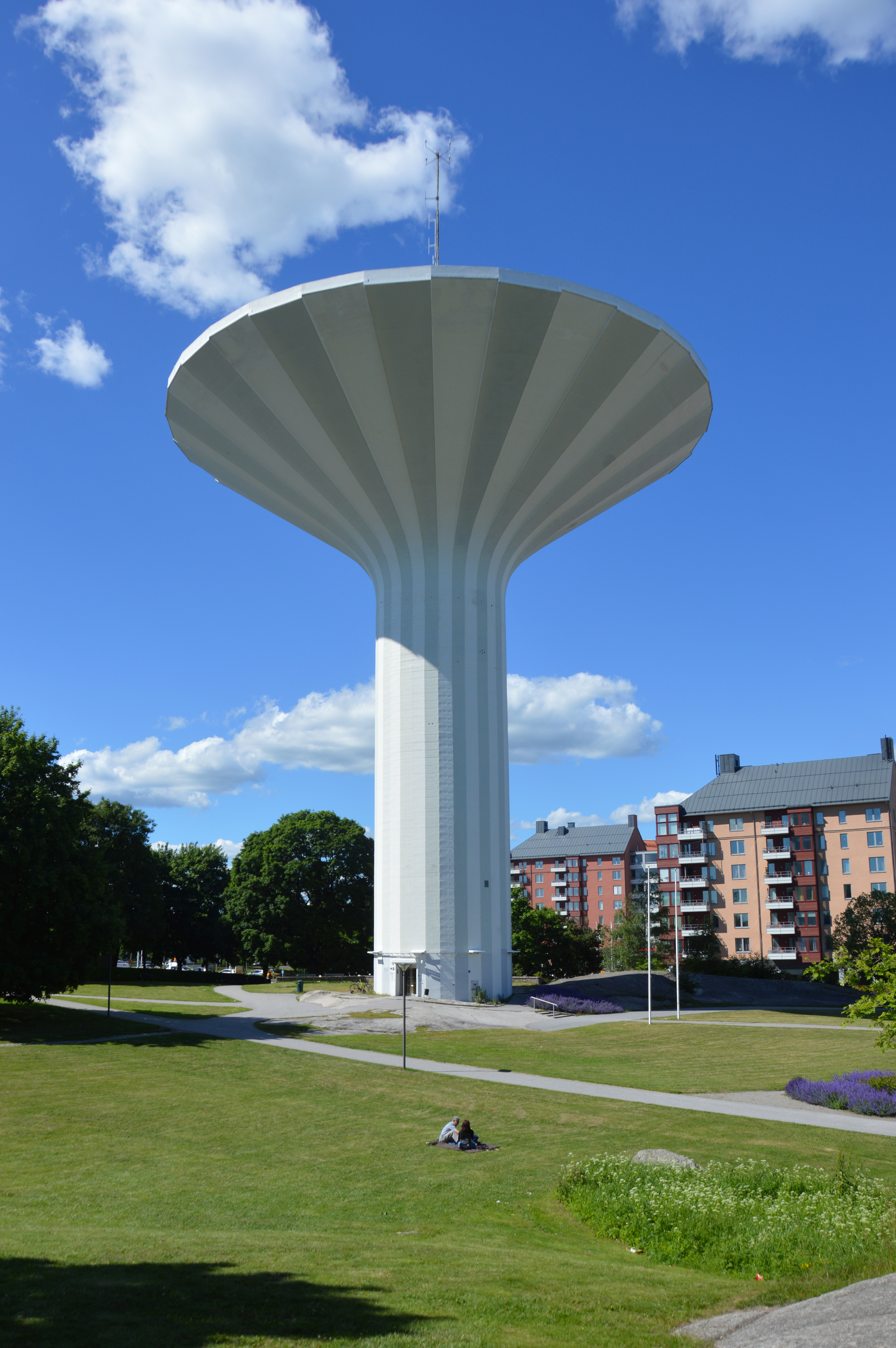
Svampen water tower

Svampen (lit. 'The mushroom') is a water tower in Örebro. It replaced the Norra Vattentornet and Södra vattentornet in 1958. It was created by architect Sune Lindström. It is 58 meters high.

The top is accessible by the public via an elevator, and hosts a small events and exhibition space with a cafe on the structure's terrace. To prevent suicide attempts in 2012 Örebro Municipality decided to build a net cage around the edges of Svampen.

In 2025, Svampen was replaced by the new water tower Lyra, located on the outskirts of the city. The new tower holds 15 million litres of water, compared with the old tower's 9 million litres.

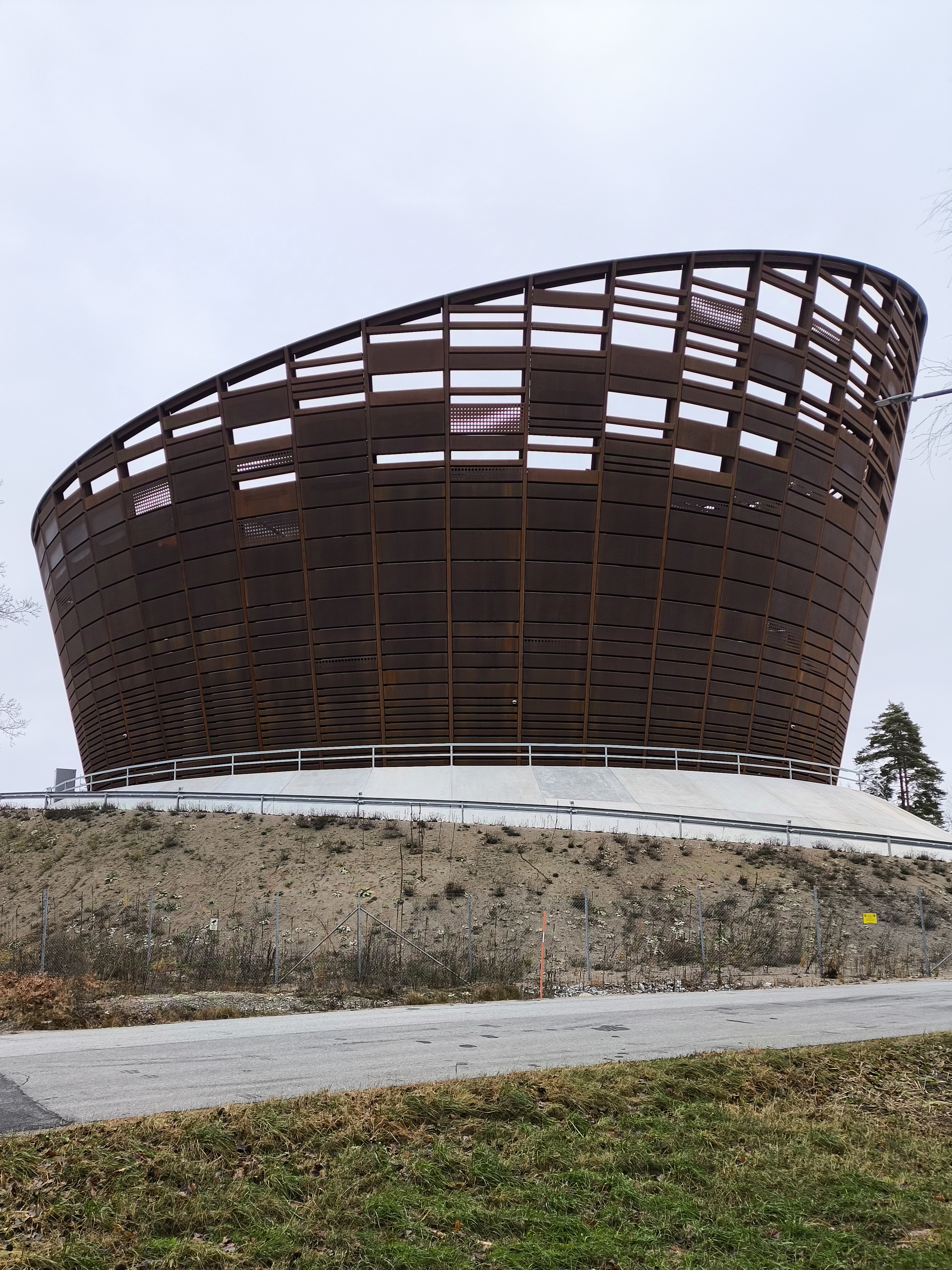
Svampen's replacement, Lyra
