= Al-Watan Park =

Park in Riyadh, Saudi Arabia

- حديقة الوطن
- Interactive map of Al-Watan Park
- Location: King Faisal Road, Al Fouta, Riyadh, Saudi Arabia
- Coordinates: 24°38′42″N 46°42′43″E
- Area: 2.9 ha (7.2 acres)
- Opened: 27 December 2005; 20 years ago
- Part of: King Abdul Aziz Historical Centre

Al-Watan Park (Arabic: حديقة الوطن), also known as the Water Tower Park, is a 2.9 hectares municipal park that encircles the Riyadh Water Tower and is one of the eight municipal parks and gardens that constitute the King Abdulaziz Historical Centre in al-Fouta neighborhood of Riyadh, Saudi Arabia. Inaugurated in December 2005 by then Riyadh governor Prince Salman bin Abdulaziz, it is also popular for its large iconic model resembling the map of the Arabian Peninsula besides canals and waterfalls that surround the water tower.
