= Norra Vattentornet =

Swedish water tower

Coordinates: 59.2849°N 15.2240°E

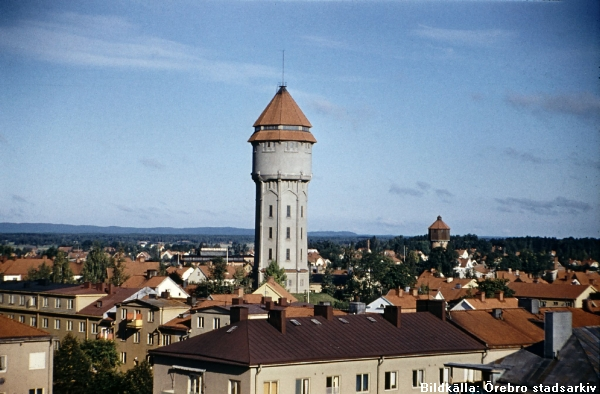
Norra vattentornet Örebro in 1956

Norra Vattentornet is a water tower in Örebro, Sweden that opened in 1915, and was closed in 1958. In 1958, the Svampen water tower was opened instead.
