= Al Murabba =

Al-Murabba المربع
- Neighbourhood
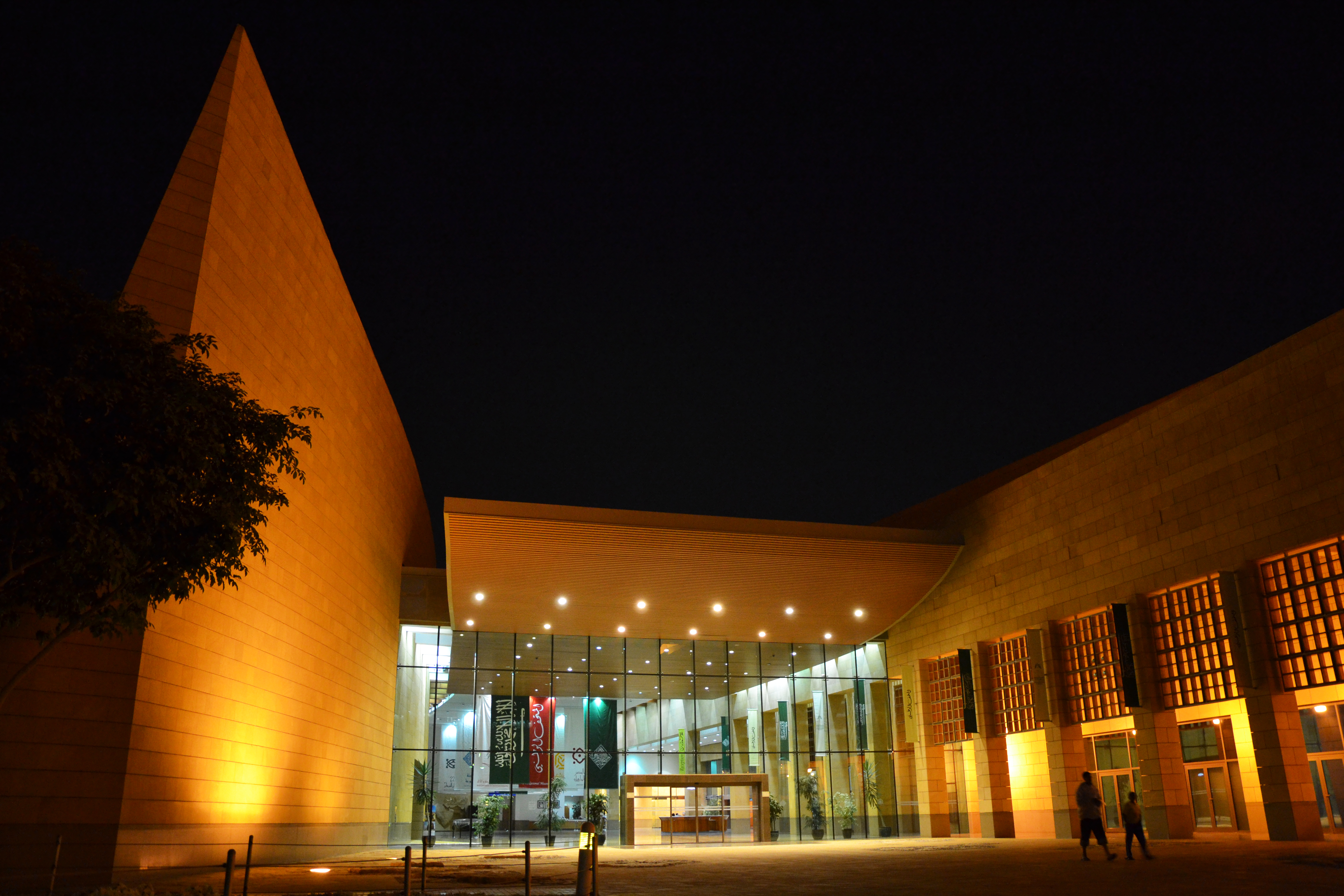
- The National Museum of Saudi Arabia, 2012
- Interactive map of Al-Murabba
- Coordinates: 24°38′46″N 46°42′36″E
- Country: Saudi Arabia
- City: Riyadh

Government
  - Body: Al Malaz Sub-Municipality

Area
  - Total: 4.88 km^{2} (1.88 sq mi)

Language
  - Official: Arabic

Al-Murabba (Arabic: المربع, romanized: al-murabbaʿ, lit. 'the square'), historically known as Beneyah, is a neighborhood in central Riyadh, Saudi Arabia, located west of al-Wazarat and north of al-Futah in the sub-municipality of al-Malaz. Its name reportedly comes from a broken square-shaped dry well around which the Murabba Palace was built in the 1940s and from where latter's name gets derived as well. It was built on the site of Beneyah, one of the towns that emerged in the aftermath of the disintegration of Hajr al-Yamamah in 16th century and is today situated in close proximity to the al-Batʼha commercial area and the Qasr al-Hukm District.

Al-Murabba has lent its name to the New Murabba project, a planned downtown and real estate development in northwestern Riyadh. The neighborhood hosts a large presence of overseas Egyptian community.

== History ==
The area was historically known as Beneyah, one of the towns that emerged from the 16th century disintegration of Hajr al-Yamamah. In the 18th century, regular skirmishes used to take place between the First Saudi State and forces loyal to Riyadh’s ruler Dahham ibn Dawwas between 1746 and 1773.

After the unification of Saudi Arabia, King Abdulaziz ordered building of palaces outside the former city walls of Old Riyadh, marking one of the preludes for the subsequent expansions of Riyadh. One of the places he chose was in the Murabba neighborhood in 1937 to build the Murabba Palace. According to Saudi historian Mansour al-Assaf, there was a square-shaped dry well in the neighborhood, from which the area derives its name 'al-Murabba' (lit. the square). In 1969, the Riyadh Water Tower was inaugurated in the neighborhood. In 1999, the King Abdulaziz Historical Center which contained the Abdulaziz's former Murabba Palace and the National Museum was inaugurated by King Fahd to commemorate the 100th anniversary (in terms of Hijri calendar) of Abdulaziz's capturing of Riyadh in 1902.

== Legacy ==
In February 2023, crown prince Mohammed bin Salman announced a new downtown project in northwest of Riyadh, known as the New Murabba, named after the neighborhood. He also unveiled the project of Mukaab, a 400-meter (1,300 ft) cuboidal skyscraper located in the New Murabba and is modeled after the cuboidal layout of the Murabba Palace.

== Gallery ==
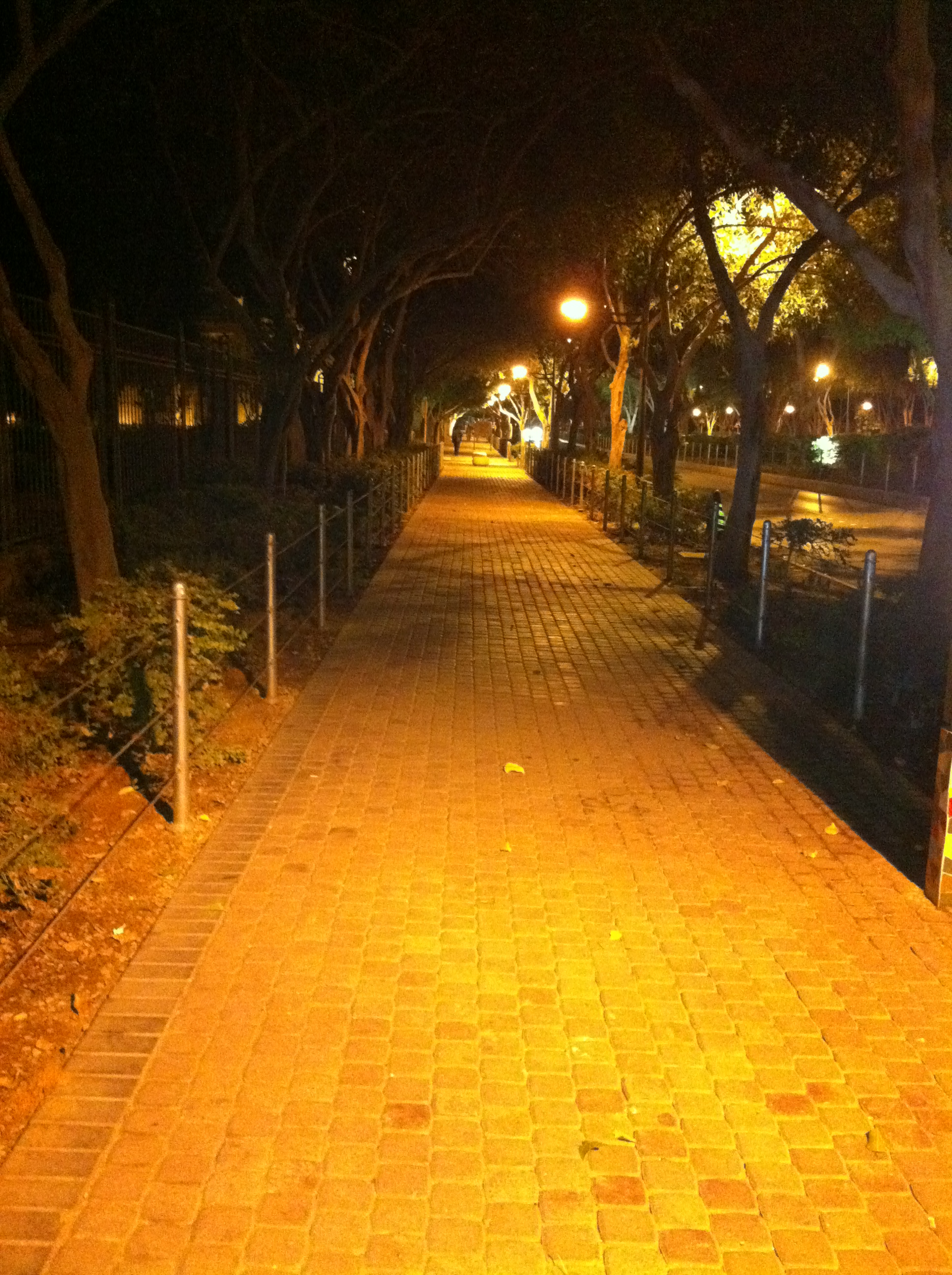
A walkway along the road crossing the historical center

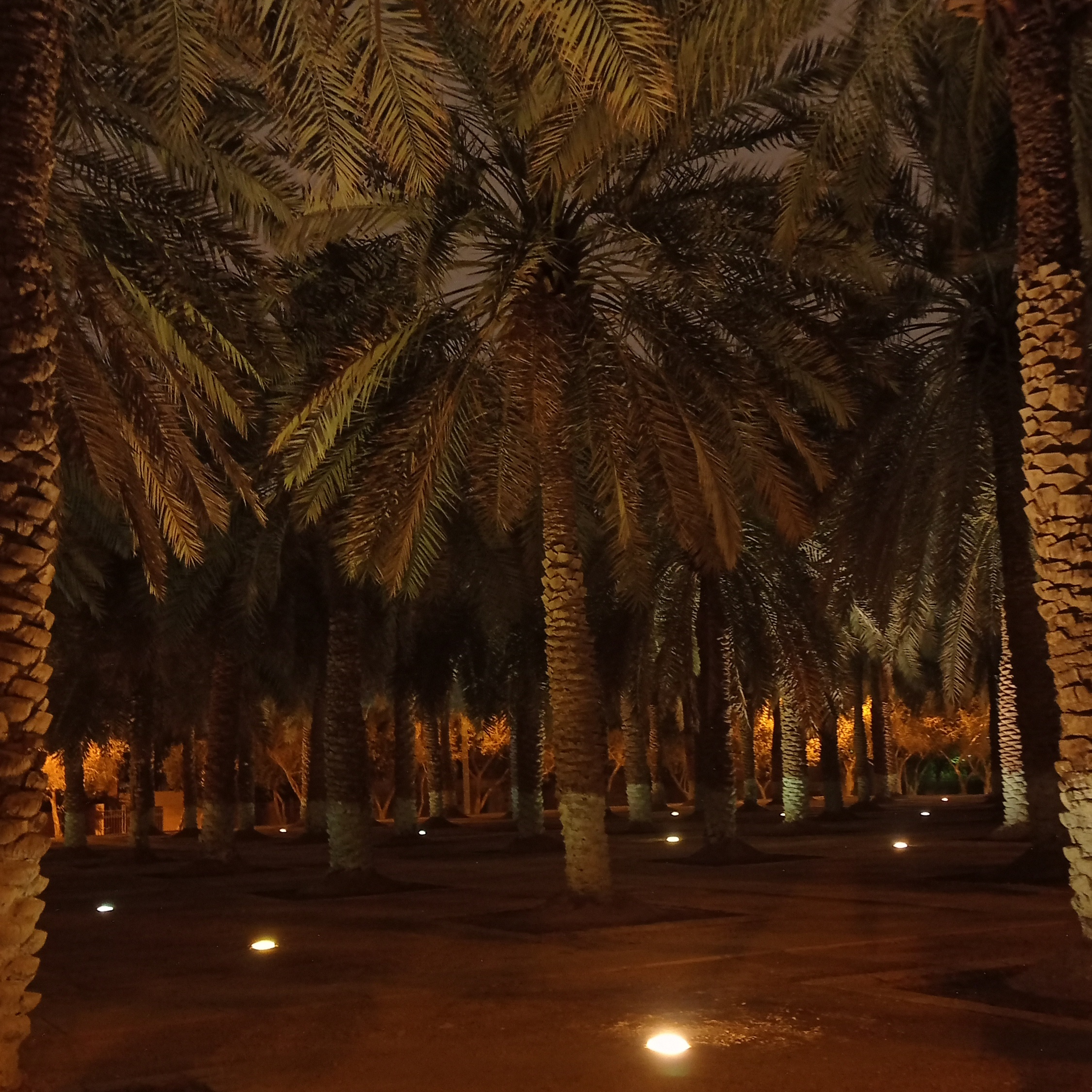
The One Hundred Palm Trees Park in Al Murabba

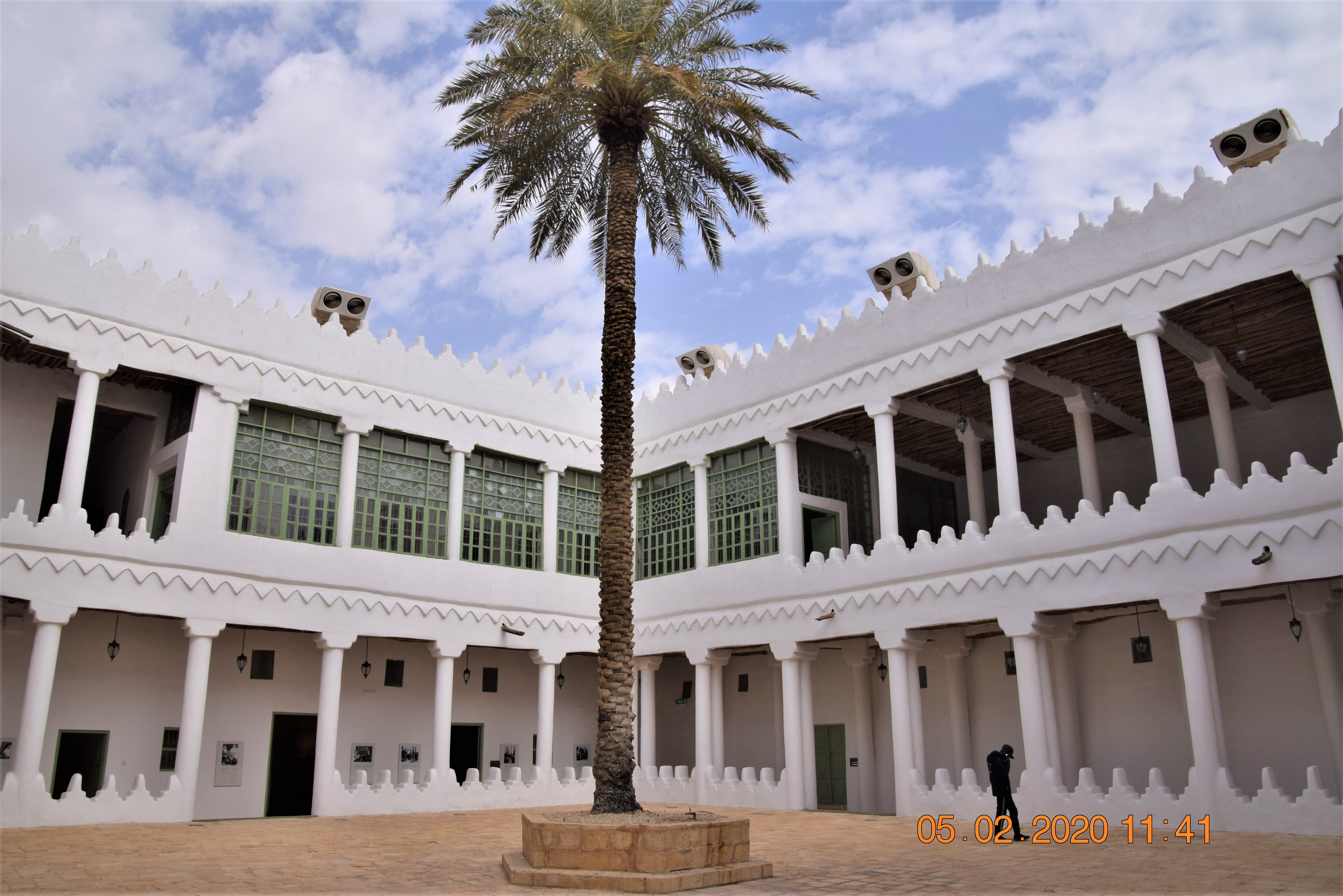
Inside Al Murabba Fort

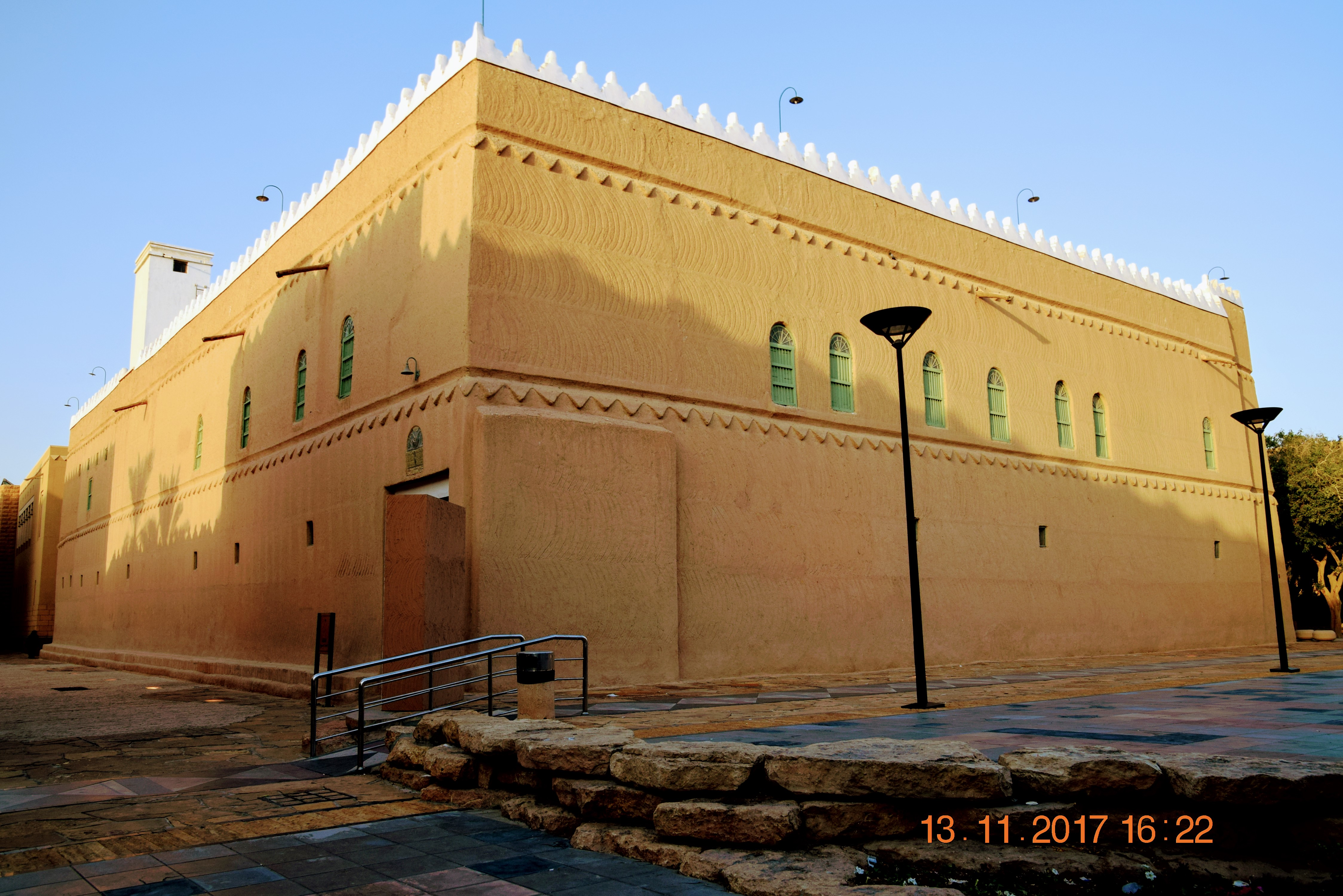
The Murabba Fort building

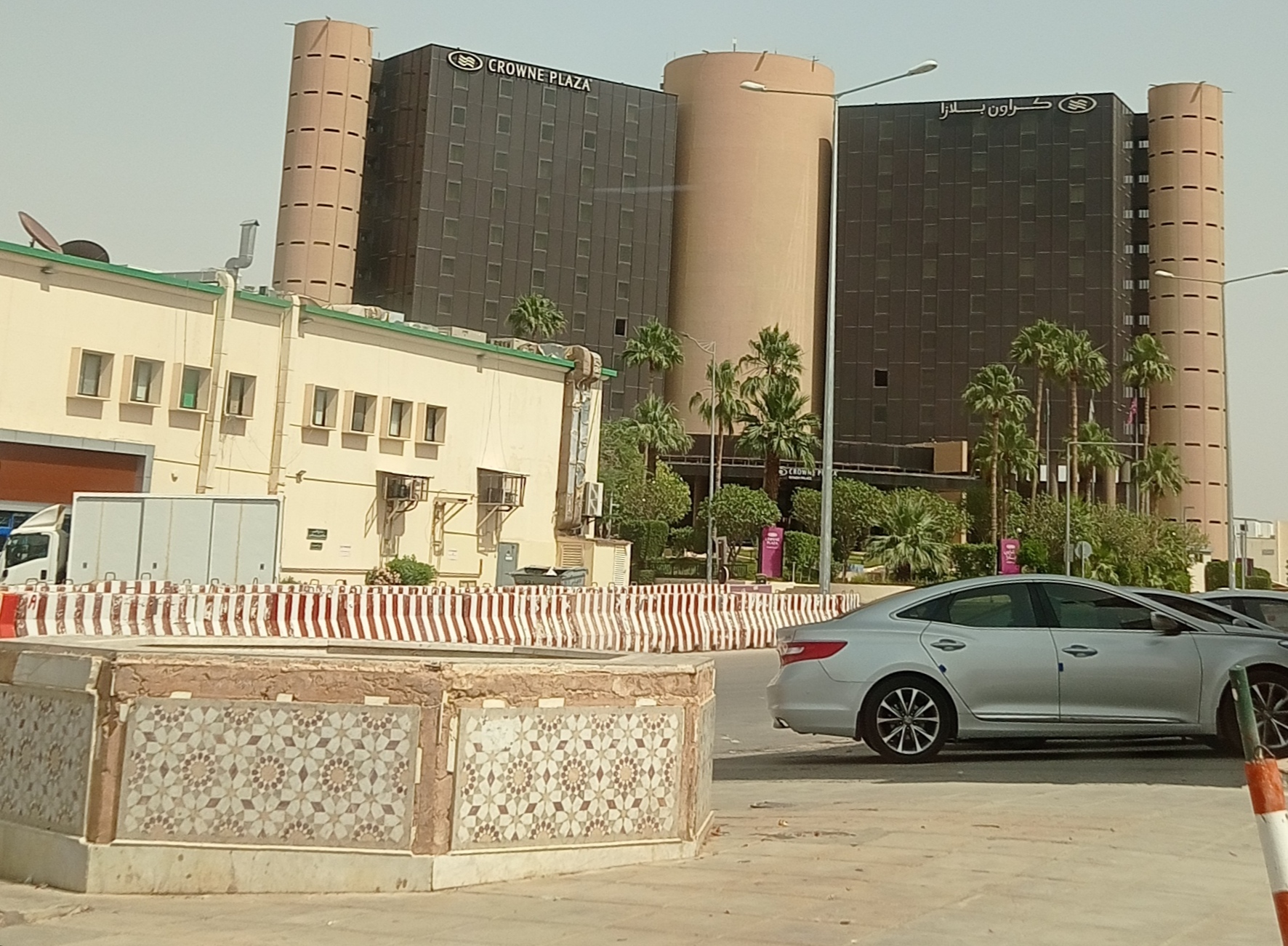
Crowne Plaza Riyadh Palace, 2023

== See also ==
- Al-Batʼha
- Al Malazz (Riyadh)
- King Abdulaziz Historical Center
