= Sune Lindström =

Swedish architect

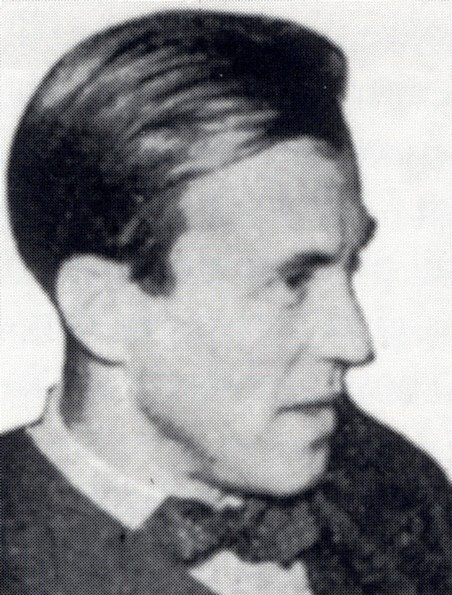

Sune Lindström (2 November 1906 – 31 October 1989) was a Swedish architect.

He was born in Malmö, Sweden, the son of Gustaf Lindström and Astrid Dahlén. He studied at the Royal Institute of Technology between 1926 and 1931. He followed with training at the Bauhaus in Dessau. Lindström was a professor at Chalmers University of Technology in Gothenburg from 1959 to 1969.

He was married to Danish architect Malene Bjørn (1914–2016), with whom he designed the Kuwait Towers in Kuwait City
