= Battle of Riyadh =

First battle in the unification of Saudi Arabia

- Part of the Unification of Saudi Arabia
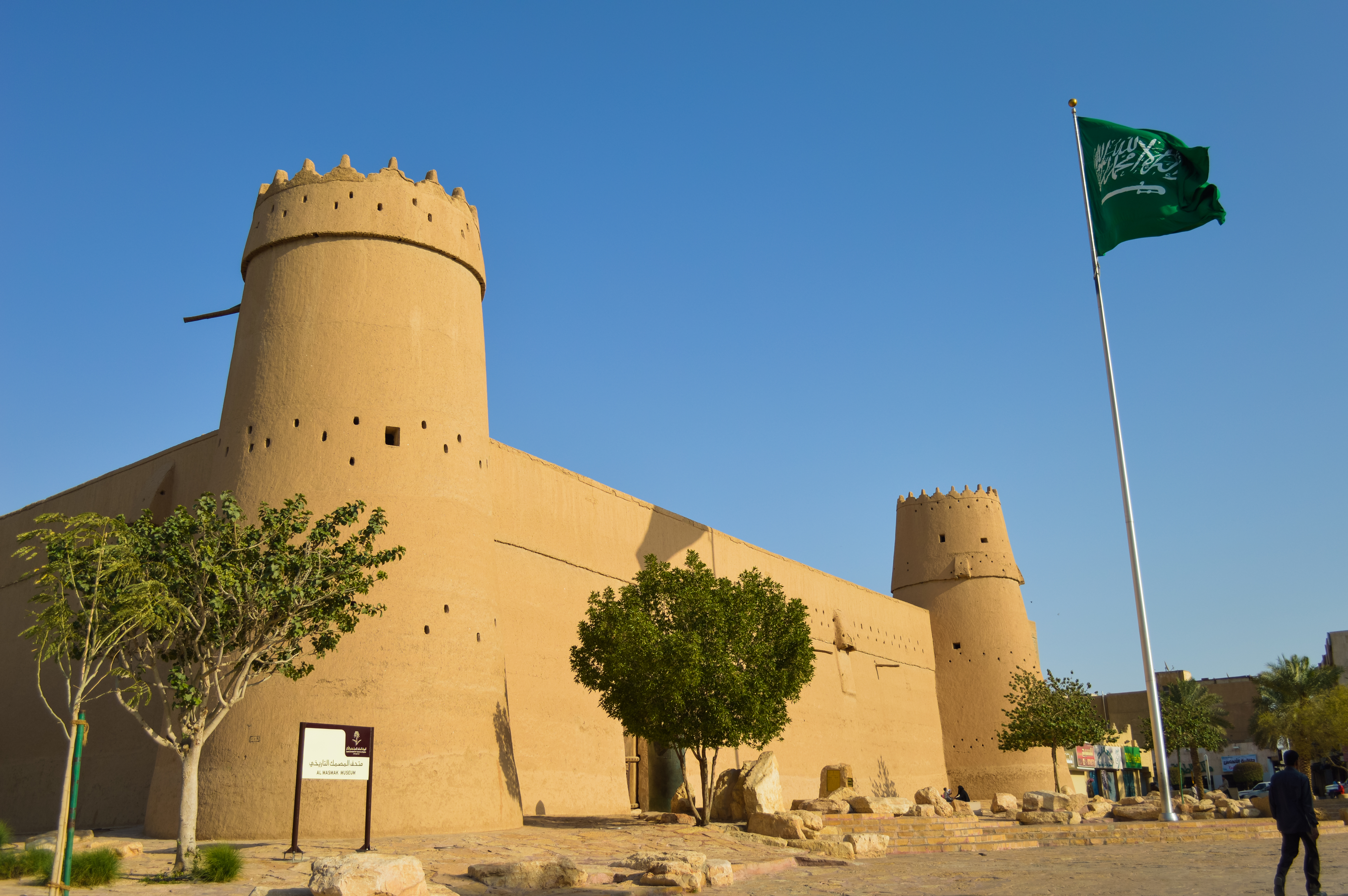
- Masmak Palace, where the battle occurred
| Date | 15 January 1902 |
| Location | Walled Riyadh, Emirate of Jabal Shammar (present-day Riyadh, Saudi Arabia) |
| Result | Saudi victory |
| Territorial changes | Annexation of Riyadh and establishment of the Emirate of Riyadh in the Third Saudi State |

Belligerents
| Jabal Shammar; Supported by: Ottoman Empire | House of Saud; Supported by: Emirate of Kuwait |

Commanders and leaders
| Ajlan bin Mohammed † | Ibn Saud |

Strength
| 80 | 40 |

Casualties and losses
| 30 dead | 7 dead |
- 37 dead

The Battle of Riyadh or the Reconquest of Riyadh, was fought on 15 January 1902 in Riyadh, then part of the Emirate of Jabal Shammar. It was a conflict between the Rashidi dynasty and the House of Saud, and ended with Ibn Saud successfully capturing the walled city.

The battle marked the beginning of Saudi Arabia’s unification, a process that lasted more than three decades, leading to the proclamation of the Kingdom of Saudi Arabia on 23 September 1932.

== Background ==
Ibn Saud, a member of the House of Saud, was the son of Abdulrahman bin Faisal, the last ruler of the Second Saudi State (Emirate of Najd). The state was defeated at the Battle of Mulayda on 21 January 1891 by the Emirate of Jabal Shammar, which had previously been a vassal state of the Second Saudi State. Following the collapse of the state, Ibn Saud and his family went into exile in Kuwait, where he spent much of his early life. From exile, he later began efforts to restore Saudi rule in central Arabia, which ultimately led to the establishment of the Third Saudi State.

== Legacy ==
In 1999, King Fahd inaugurated the King Abdulaziz Historical Center in Riyadh to commemorate the centenary of the battle. At the same time, the Palm Oasis Park was also opened to the public, featuring one hundred date palms symbolizing the 100th anniversary of the battle according to the Hijri calendar.

In 2013, the Heroes’ Gate monument was inaugurated on Highway 40 in southwestern Riyadh. The monument pays tribute to King Abdulaziz and his companions for their role in the capture of the walled town of Riyadh.

== See also ==
- History of Saudi Arabia
- Unification of Saudi Arabia
- List of wars involving Saudi Arabia
- List of modern conflicts in the Middle East
