= Murabba Palace =

Historic building in Riyadh

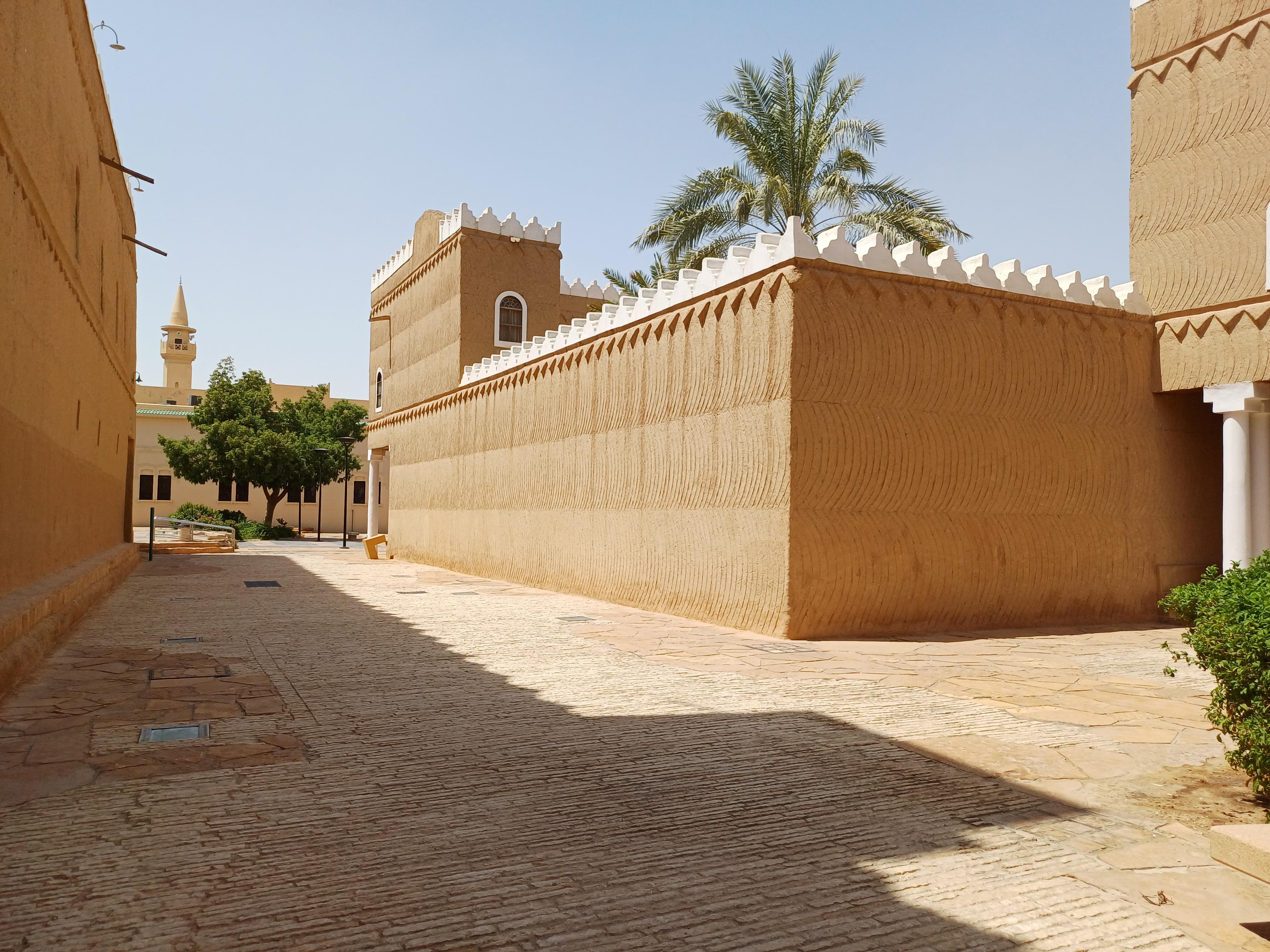
- Interactive map of the Murabba Palace area

General information
- Architectural style: Najdi architecture
- Location: Riyadh, Saudi Arabia
- Coordinates: 24°38′47″N 46°42′33″E
- Construction started: 1936
- Completed: 1938
- Client: King Abdulaziz

Technical details
- Size: 9,844.64 m^{2}

Design and construction
- Engineer: Ibn Qabba

Murabba Palace (Arabic: قصر المربّع Qaṣr al Murabbaʿ; literally the 'Square Palace') is a historic palace in the al-Murabba neighborhood of Riyadh, Saudi Arabia, located in the King Abdulaziz Historical Center. One of the first buildings erected outside the walls of the old city, it served as the official workplace and main residence of King Abdulaziz ibn Saud from 1938 until his death in 1953. It is named after its square with the form of 400 by 400 metres (1,300 by 1,300 ft). The palace was transformed into a museum and opened to the general public in 1999.

== History ==
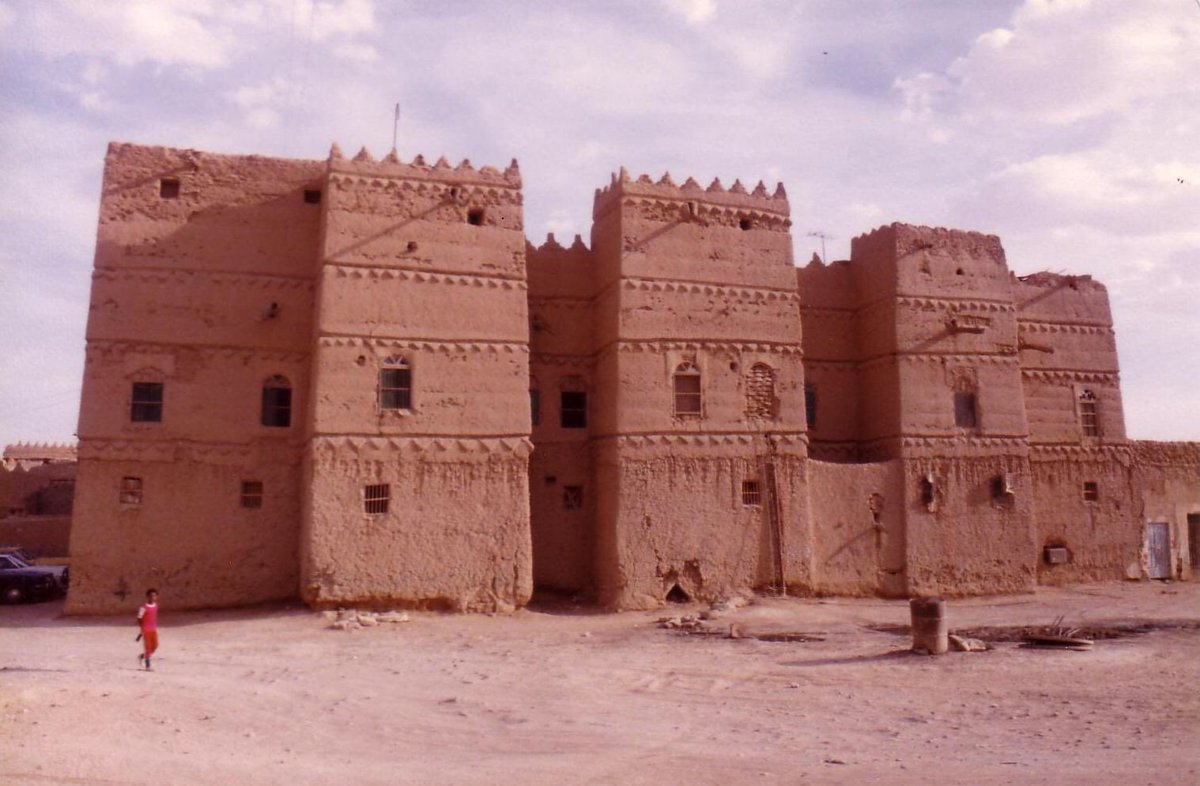
Murabba Palace, 1980

The palace was built by King Abdulaziz outside the walled town of Riyadh, being the first major expansion of the city in the twentieth century. Construction was started in 1936 and partly finalized in 1938. It was fully completed in 1945. The construction was supervised by builder Ibn Qabba, but the King also personally involved in the construction process. The palace was intended to be a family residence and court for the king. With the construction of the palace three novel technologies were introduced to the Saudi society: the use of the automobiles as means of transportation, electricity by means of generators and water closets with drainage systems. In order to connect the palace with the city center a concrete road was constructed which was also new in the city. In 1939 electricity, lighting, fans, limited air-conditioning, a central water supply and lavatories were added by the Aramco technicians to the palace.

The king left his former court in Masmak fort when the construction was finished, and used the palace as his residence and court from 1938 until his death in 1953. One of his wives, Hussa bint Ahmed Al Sudairi, also moved with him to the palace in 1938. Another palace, Addeera, was also used as a royal residence.

During the reign of King Abdulaziz Murabba Palace witnessed many official visits and sign of various agreements. A lift was installed into the Murabba Palace in the late 1940s when the king had difficulty in climbing the stairs due to advanced arthritis. It was the first lift in Saudi Arabia. The king appointed one of his sons, Prince Mansour, as emir of the palace.

King Abdulaziz's successor, King Saud, also used the palace for official activities. For instance, he inaugurated the council of ministers with a ceremony in the Murabba Palace on 7 March 1954.

== Location ==
The Murabba palace is situated two kilometers north of the old city of Riyadh, and its total area was over 16 hectares. The area of the palace was later expanded to 30 hectares. In a study dated 2021 the size of the palace is cited as 9,844.64 m^{2}.

The palace is located about half a mile from Masmak fort. The area of the palace was called Murabba Al Sufyan. In the south of the palace there are gardens, and the Batha valley is situated in the east. Wadi Abu Rafie is in the west, and small hills lie on the north of the palace.

Murabba Palace is very close to Al Shamsia mansion which was the residence of Saud Al Kabeer and his wife Noura bint Abdul Rahman, elder sister of King Abdulaziz. In the 1950s the Murabba Palace was connected to Al Nasriyah Farm which is in fact a rural palace in the west of old Riyadh through a stone road.

== Layout and style ==
The building is a complex of palaces used for different purposes, housing two stories with 32 rooms. Overall shape of the building is cubic. It is made up of residential buildings, service facilities and the diwan of the king. These buildings are surrounded by a courtyard. A huge brick wall also surrounds the palace, and there are nine gates. The main gate was originally on the west side, but, later the gate on the southern side was used as main entrance which allowed a short link to the nearby mosque.

The upper floor of the building used for court of the king included audience hall, offices of administrative affairs, communications and guest chambers. The ground floor housed the offices for palace utilities, security and administration.

The building has a plain style and reflects the general features of the traditional Najdi architecture. It also reflects the general characteristics of Najd's urban pattern, namely solid masses, covered streets, and the integration of courtyards. The palace was built mainly by bricks, indigenous stones, tamarisk trunk and palm-leaf stalks. The walls of the building were made by straw reinforced adobe, and have engraved ornaments on coating. Local acacia with palm frond matts was used for the ceiling of the palace. The wood beams supporting the ceiling have decorations with yellow, red, and black geometric patterns.

== Gallery ==
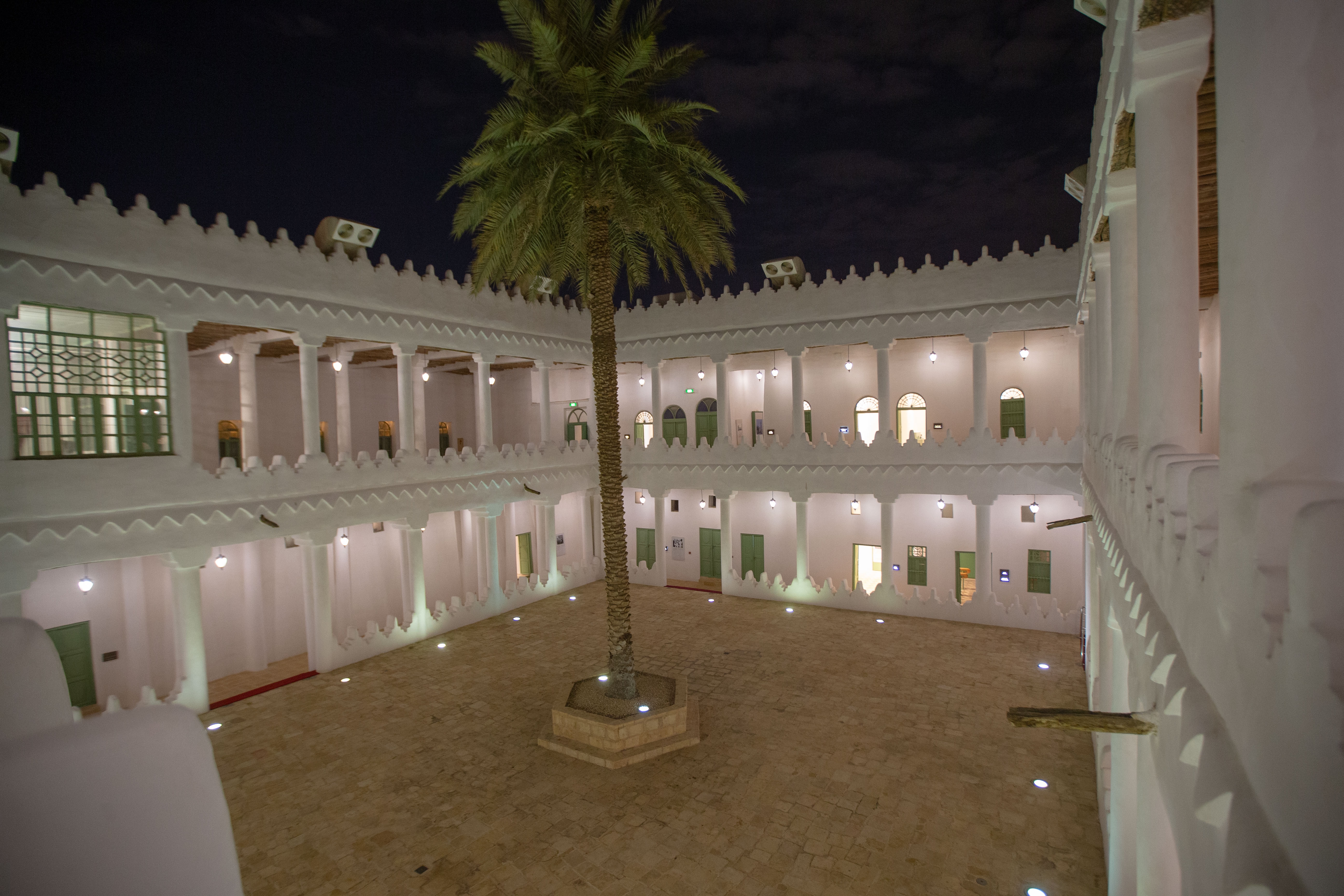
Interior courtyard of Murabba Palace

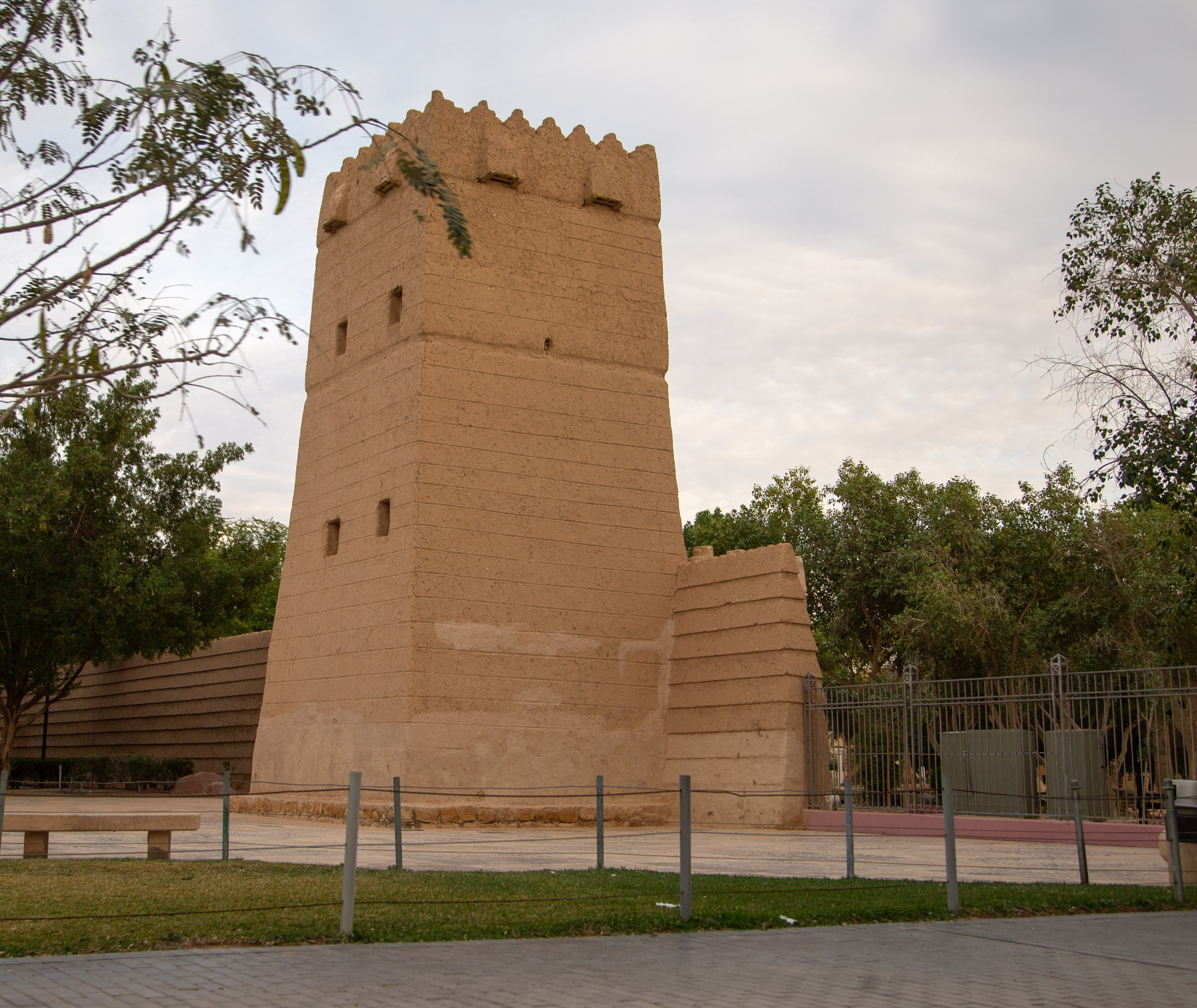
Exterior view of Murabba Palace

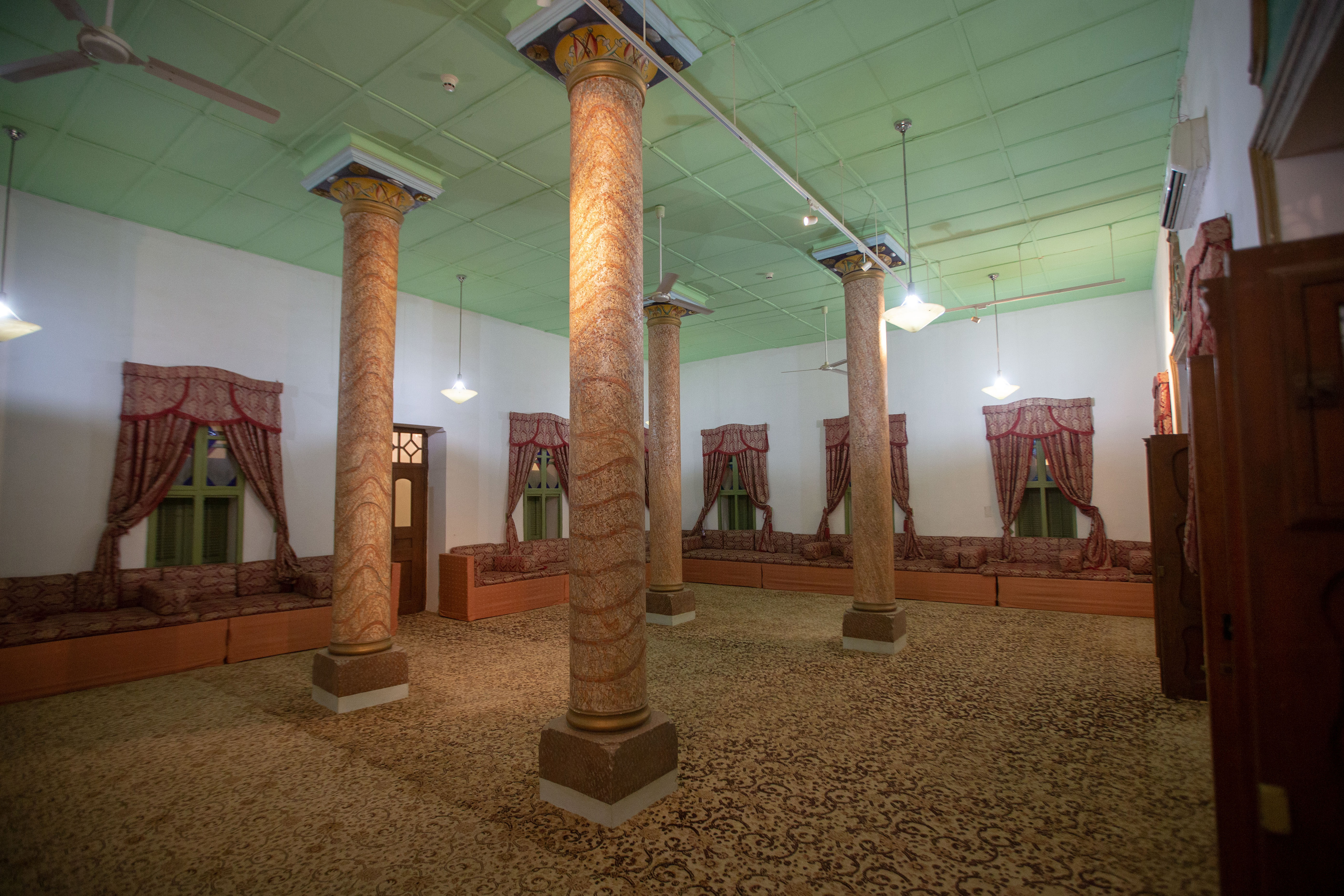
Interior exhibition space in Murabba Palace

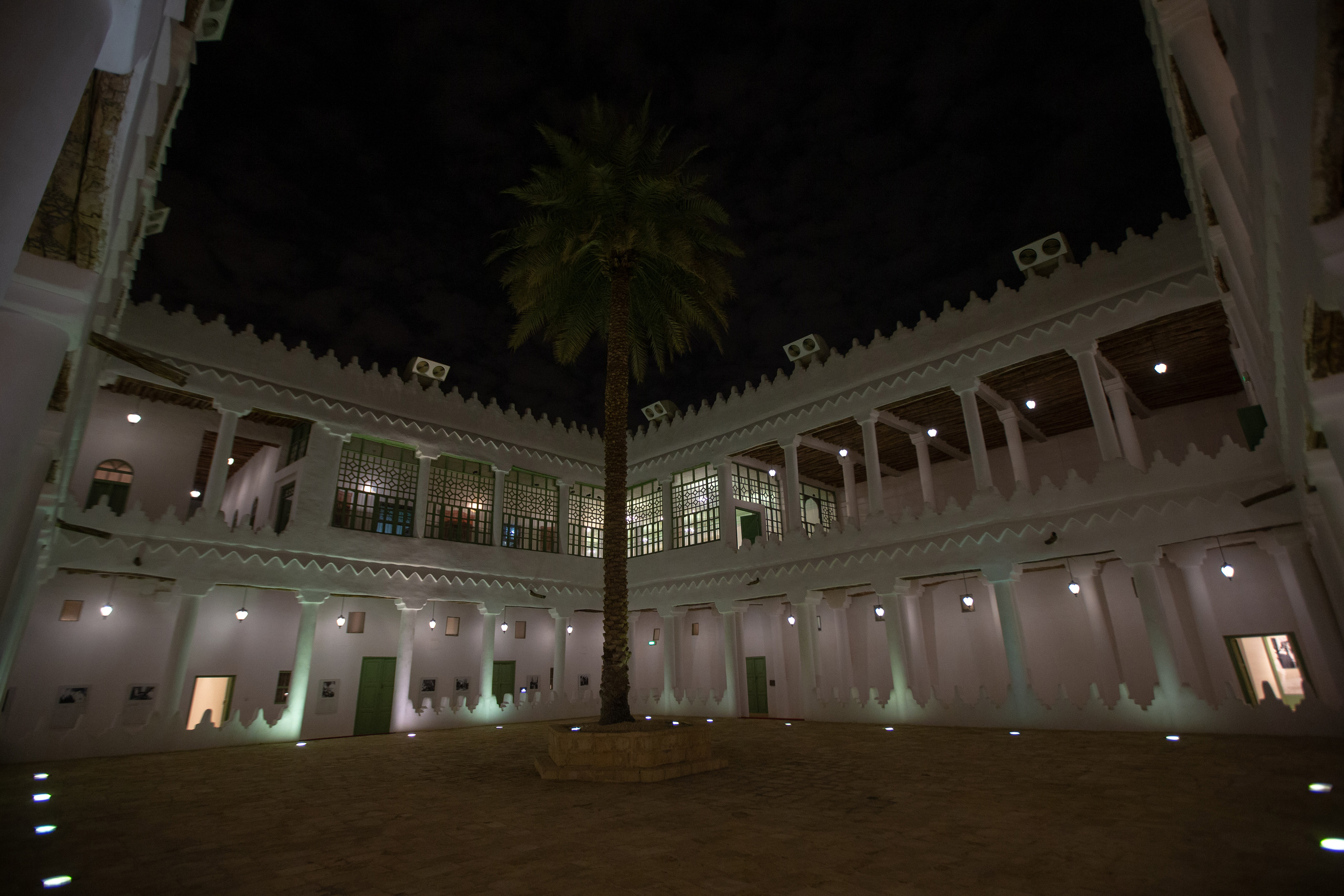
Interior view of Murabba Palace

== Current usage ==
A development project was initiated by the Saudi Commission for Tourism & Antiquities in 1999 to renovate the Murabba palace. It was converted into a museum and became open to public visits. As part of the King Abdulaziz Historical Center project, Murabba Palace was restored and furnished to reflect the period associated with the later years of King Abdulaziz. It was called "living museum" after renovation. It is part of the King Abdulaziz Darat or King Abdulaziz Historical Center.

In the current usage, the ground floor includes the guards' room and stores for food, coffee, wood and other materials needed for cooking. The upper floor is made up of salons and waiting rooms for visitors. There several historic garments and crafts are exhibited. There are also the King Abdulaziz memorial hall and a written and photographic archive centre in the building.

One of the dignitaries welcomed at the Murabba Palace was General Secretary of the Chinese Communist Party Xi Jinping who visited Saudi Arabia in January 2016. On 20 May 2017 the US President Donald Trump and his wife Melania Trump attended a dinner which was organized by King Salman bin Abdulaziz Al Saud at the Murabba Palace.

== See also ==
- New Murabba
