= Mahmoud Bodo Rasch =

German architect (born 1943)

Mahmoud Bodo Rasch (born 12 May 1943) is a German architect who specializes in the construction of large convertible umbrellas and lightweight structures. He is founder and owner of SL Rasch GmbH Special and Lightweight Structures with branches in Leinfelden-Echterdingen, Jeddah, Mecca and Medina.

== Life ==
Mahmud Bodo Rasch’s father, Bodo Rasch (1903–1995), and uncle Heinz Rasch were figures within the international architectural avant-garde during the 1920s. His mother, Lilo Rasch-Naegele (1914-1978), was a painter and graphic designer, and his sister Aiga (1941-2009) was an illustrator and graphic designer. Following in his family’s artistic tradition, Mahmud Bodo Rasch in 1964 began studying for a degree in architecture at the University of Stuttgart, from which he was graduated in 1972. In 1967 and during the course of his studies, Mahmoud Bodo Rasch worked with Frei Otto at the Institut für leichte Flächentragwerke (Institute for Lightweight Structures) at the University of Stuttgart and, in 1969, at the Design and Development Bureau Atelier Frei Otto Warmbronn. Rasch led construction of the new institute building (the tensile structure had originally been developed for the German Pavilion at Expo 67 in Montreal) and assumed the role of project leader for the convertible umbrellas, which Frei Otto had designed and built for the 1971 Bundesgartenschau in Cologne. Several joint projects and a close friendship resulted from this partnership, and to this day Frei Otto remains an advisor to Mahmud Bodo Rasch’s team.

In 1973, Bodo Rasch was guest lecturer at the School of Architecture in the University of Texas at Austin, in the United States. In 1974 came the opportunity to take part in an urban development competition aimed at providing pilgrim accommodation for the Tent City in Tal Mina, Mecca. In the same year Bodo Rasch converted to Islam. In 1975 Mahmoud Bodo Rasch and Sami Angawi founded the Hajj Research Center at the King Abdulaziz University in Jeddah, Saudi Arabia. In 1980 his dissertation about the Tent Cities of Hajj was published in a series titled “Information of the Institute for Lightweight Structures (IL) University of Stuttgart, IL 29 The Tent Cities of the Hajj”.

In 1980, Mahmoud Bodo Rasch founded the architecture firm Rasch and Associates and then, in 1991, the special and lightweight construction firm SL GmbH, which since 1998 has operated under the title of SL Rasch GmbH Special and Lightweight Structures. In 1998 Rasch’s long-standing chief architect Jürgen Bradatsch became a partner in the architecture firm Rasch and Bradatsch.

Together with his team, Mahmoud Bodo Rasch pursues Frei Otto’s principles of lightweight construction on the basis of scientific research. His newly established team for Islamic design brings the minimalistic forms of lightweight construction together in harmony with the ornamentation of sacred buildings.

Rasch’s many years of work in the Middle East and his realization of adaptable lightweight structures led to a series of large scale projects for the Holy Cities of Islam. In cooperation with many highly specialized businesses, Rasch and his team have developed a number of unusual projects such as the Makkah Clock Tower – the largest clock tower in the world. Other projects of this kind include the 250 convertible umbrellas that shade the piazza of the Prophet’s Mosque in Medina and protect pilgrims from sun and rain.
