= Lilo Rasch-Naegele =

German painter

Lilo Rasch-Naegele (born 12 December 1914, Stuttgart – died 3 June 1978, Oberaichen) was a German painter, graphic artist, fashion designer and book illustrator. Her extensive work left a distinct mark on the artistic landscape of Stuttgart.

== Life ==
Liselotte Margarete Naegele was the daughter of Karl Alfons Naegele, a painter from Stuttgart who worked in a studio on Marienstrasse. By the time her father died in 1927, twelve-year-old Liselotte was drawing advertisements for the display windows of neighbouring shops.

From 1922 to 1930 Naegele attended the Catholic High School for Girls in Stuttgart. After this she took drawing lessons at the State Vocational School in Hoppenlau after winning a drawing scholarship from the advertisement firm Carl Markiewicz at the Württemberg State Art School in Stuttgart. From 1931 to 1933 she was a full-time student in the Graphics Department. During this time, she was greatly influenced by her teacher, Professor Ernst Schneidler, founder of the Stuttgart School of Graphic Design (Stuttgarter Schule im Bereich grafischer Gestaltung).

After graduation, Naegele had her own drawing studio on Stuttgart’s Reinsburgstrasse. She became a much sought after graphic designer, stylist and book illustrator for well-known textile firms like Gröber-Neufra and the publisher Deutsche Verlagsgesellschaft Stuttgart.

In 1934, Lilo Naegele won a contract to design the display window of star hairdresser Hugo Benner’s salon in the Stuttgart Wilhelmsbau. This made her well known to the city’s artistic circle of intellectuals and to Bodo Rasch, the architect who furnished the salon. Other patrons of the time were the Hölzel students Willi Baumeister, who designed Benner’s letter paper; Lily Hildebrandt, née Uhlmann, and her husband, the art historian Professor Hans Hildebrandt. From 1938 to 1939, Naegele worked in Berlin for the magazines "Die Dame" and "Die neue Linie", as well as for the film company Tobis.

In 1940 she married Bodo Rasch, becoming Lili Rash-Naegele. Their marriage bore two children: a daughter, Aiga and a son, Bodo, now a prominent tensile architect. Shortly after the end of the war, Rasch-Naegele continued her artistic success of the pre-war years from her studio on Reinsburgstrasse. She worked for several well-known names such as Aral, Schiesser and Elbeo; for the advertising arm of the newspaper Stern; and also for various publishers.

Lilo Rasch-Naegele was part of a group of artists who met at "Bubenbad" with Professor Willi Baumeister. This Stuttgart gentlemen’s club served as a meeting point for art historians Herbert Herrmann and Hans Hildebrandt; the art critic Kurt Leonhard; philosopher Max Bense; the publishers Albrecht Knaus and Gerd Hatje; painters Alfred Eichhorn, Cuno Fischer and Peter Jakob Schober; the photographer Adolf Lazi; the product designers Wilhelm Wagenfeld and Hans Warnecke; and the psychiatrist and art collector Ottomar Domnick.

From 1950, Lilo Rasch-Naegele was based in a modern villa to the west of Stuttgart in Wispelwald, Oberaichen. The villa was designed by Bodo Rasch for his family. Here, Lilo Rasch-Naegele devoted her initial creative energy to free, non-commercial painting, producing a remarkable number of oil paintings and a great mixture of experimental graphic work up until her sudden death in 1978. As of 2012, her work is undergoing an academic reappraisal as part of the administration of her estate.

== Collections ==
Much of Rasch-Naegele's work can be found in businesses including Bally, Hoechst and Schiesser, in public collections such as the Kunstmuseum Stuttgart and in the town of Leinfelden. Pieces can also be found in a variety of regional and international private collections.

== Exhibitions ==
From 1949 onwards, a number of individual and group exhibitions dedicated to Lilo Rasch-Naegele were featured in both the Stuttgart area and outside. They displayed her work in places such as Paris (1960), Vevey (1965), Athens (1967) and Manosque in southern France (1973, 1977).

== Catalogue ==
(Selected)

- Lilo Rasch-Naegele, Exh.cat. Galerie Lutz & Meyer, Stuttgart, 1957
- Lilo Rasch-Naegele, Introduction by Werner P. Heyd, Stuttgart 1976 (Besler Verlag) ISBN 3763016511
- Lilo Rasch-Naegele. Ölbilder und Grafik (Oil Paintings and Graphics) 1936-1978, Exh. cat. Städtische Galerie Filderhalle, Leinfelden-Echterdingen, 1988
- Lilo Rasch-Naegele. Frauen, Exh. cat., n. place, 1994
