= Mecca Time =

Proposed time standard

Mecca Time was a proposed time standard that uses the line of longitude that goes through Mecca, Saudi Arabia (39°49′34″ E of the Greenwich Meridian) as its Prime Meridian. A clock based on this meridian would be at approximately UTC+02:39:18.3.

40th meridian east (interactive map)

The proposal was made by Sheikh Yusuf al-Qaradawi and other Muslim clerics meeting in Doha, Qatar on April 21, 2008 for a conference titled "Mecca: the Center of the Earth, Theory and Practice".

== Qatar conference ==
The "Mecca: the Center of the Earth, Theory and Practice" conference was organized and attended by Muslim theologians and other religious officials from across the world. The Qatar meeting was the culmination of efforts to seek answers for scientific questions from the Qur'an and other Islamic scriptures – a trend called "Ijaz al-Qur'an" (Miraculous nature of the Qur'an). The conference promoted the belief that Islamic scripture also revealed scientific details, with Islamic scholars seeking to unearth and publicize the textual evidence.

The conference revived a decades-old controversial issue, contending that the Greenwich Meridian was imposed by the United Kingdom and Western civilization during the colonial period and that Islam, unlike other religions, does not contradict science. One of the contentions was that unlike other longitudes, Mecca was in perfect alignment with the magnetic north. Muslim clerics hail this as evidence of the greatness of the qibla—the direction determined to be towards Mecca that Muslims across the world must turn towards while reciting prayers.

== Mecca clock ==
On 11 August 2010, (1 Ramadan, AH 1431), the large clock at Abraj Al Bait started to operate. Some Muslims hoped that this would establish "Mecca Time" as the world's defining time zone. While officials had originally expressed the conviction that the clock might help to establish Mecca as a prime meridian, it was instead set to Arabia Standard Time (UTC+3).

== Criticism ==
It is not clear what the speakers at the conference meant by "perfect alignment with the North Magnetic Pole". As the geomagnetic field of the earth continuously changes the deviation of the compass needle from true north (known as the magnetic declination) also slowly changes. In the past, there were periods when the compass needle at Mecca pointed true north (and there will be future periods when this is true again) but at the moment the line of no compass deviation is located somewhat to the southeast of Mecca. In 2023 the (predicted) magnetic declination of Mecca is 3.6° East and will continue to increase at about +0.04° per year.

During the 1884 International Meridian Conference, when Greenwich was established as the initial meridian, the Ottoman Empire, at that time controlling Mecca, voted with the majority for Greenwich.
