= SL Rasch GmbH Special and Lightweight Structures =

Architecture firm in Germany

Practice information
- Key architects: Mustafa Rasch, Chairman; Jürgen Bradatsch, Chief Architect
- Founded: 1980

Significant works and honors
- Buildings: Convertible Umbrellas and Sliding Domes for the Extension of the Prophet’s Mosque in Medina clock and tower-top of the Makkah Clock Tower
- Awards: Best Innovation, "International Association for Automation and Robotics in Construction", Houston, Texas

The SL Rasch GmbH Special and Lightweight Structures, based in Stuttgart, Germany, specializes in special and lightweight structures integrating architecture and engineering. The company was founded by Mahmoud Bodo Rasch. The company has branches in Leinfelden-Echterdingen, Jeddah, Mecca and Medina. Among the most famous projects are the large retractable umbrellas in front of the Mosque of the Prophet in Medina and the Makkah Clock Tower, the tallest clock tower in the world.

== History ==
In 1980 Mahmoud Bodo Rasch founded the architecture firm Rasch and Associates and then, in 1991, the special and lightweight construction firm SL GmbH. In 1998 Rasch's long-standing chief architect Jürgen Bradatsch became a partner in the architectural office Rasch und Bradatsch. Since 1998 the company has been trading as SL Rasch GmbH Special and Lightweight Structures.

== Profile ==
The founder Mahmoud Bodo Rasch studied with Frei Otto, worked in the Frei Otto Warmbronn studio and at the Institute for Lightweight Structures at the University of Stuttgart. An interdisciplinary team of professionals composed of architects, structural and mechanical engineers, computer specialists and designers works together under one roof.

SL Rasch pursues Frei Otto's principles of lightweight construction on the basis of scientific research and brings the minimalistic forms together in harmony with the ornamentation of sacred buildings. SL Rasch is specialised in the development and construction of special and lightweight structures such as large umbrellas and convertible roofs. The foundation of the work is research and the development of specific software.

The firm works with a High Performance Computing Cluster and employs about 30 people.
