= Aiga Rasch =

German illustrator, graphic artist and painter

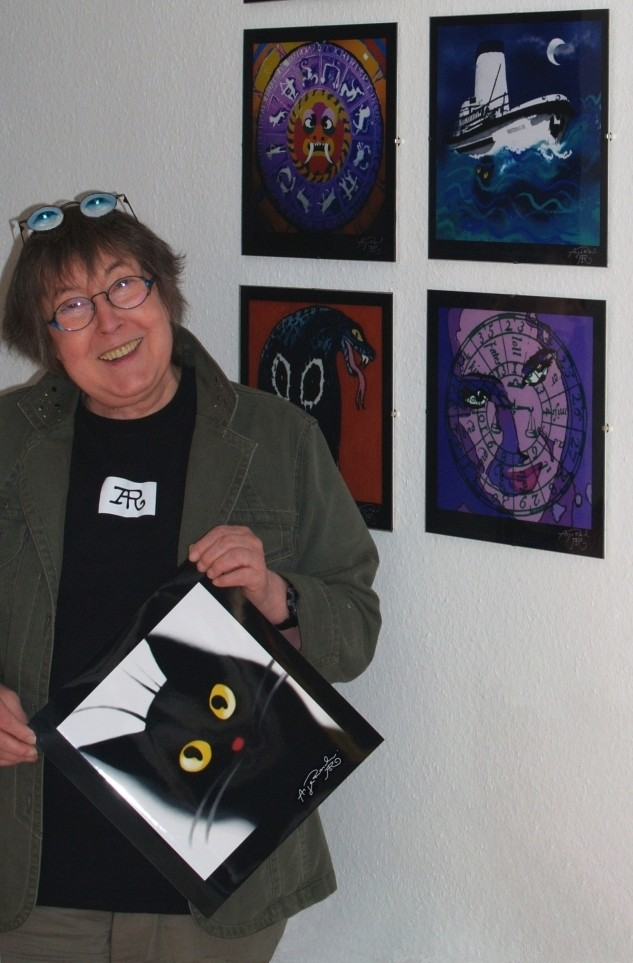
- Rasch in 2008
- Born: 9 July 1941; Stuttgart, Germany
- Died: 24 December 2009 (aged 68); Kirchheim unter Teck, Germany
- Occupations: Illustrator; graphic artist; painter
- Parents: Bodo Rasch (father); Lilo Rasch-Naegele (mother)
- Relatives: Mahmoud Bodo Rasch (brother)

Aiga Rasch (9 July 1941 – 24 December 2009) was a German illustrator, graphic artist, and painter.

== Life ==
=== Family provenance and childhood ===
Aiga Rasch was born in Stuttgart during the early years of the Second World War. Her father, Bodo Rasch (1903–1995), and her younger brother, Mahmoud Bodo Rasch, were avant-garde architects. Her mother, Lilo Rasch-Naegele (1914–1978), was a fashion photographer and illustrator, and a member of the artists' group around Willi Baumeister.

She turned to painting as a small child since, during the years of austerity that followed the end of the War, there were no toys available: instead, her mother gave her a brush and palette even when the tubes of paint were too hard for the child's fingers to control with any precision. She grew up living in the family house her parents built after 1945 on the edge of the Schönbuch parkland to the south-west of Stuttgart, initially planning to become a writer. She enjoyed her education at the "Friedensschule" (literally: "Peace School") in Stuttgart, where school meals came from the kitchens of the American army, Stuttgart having ended up under US military control at the end of the war. She later recalled that the resulting school food was "healthier than it tasted" ("gesünder als sie schmeckt"). Shortly before taking her school leaving exams (Abitur) she entered a novel writing competition organised by Kosmos Verlag. Her submission included her own illustrations. This gave her the opportunity to submit an embryonic "portfolio" to the publishing house, for which her mother already worked as a free-lance illustrator. For Aigo Rasch that novel writing competition marked the start of what later became a long and successful collaborative relationship with Kosmos.

=== Career choices ===
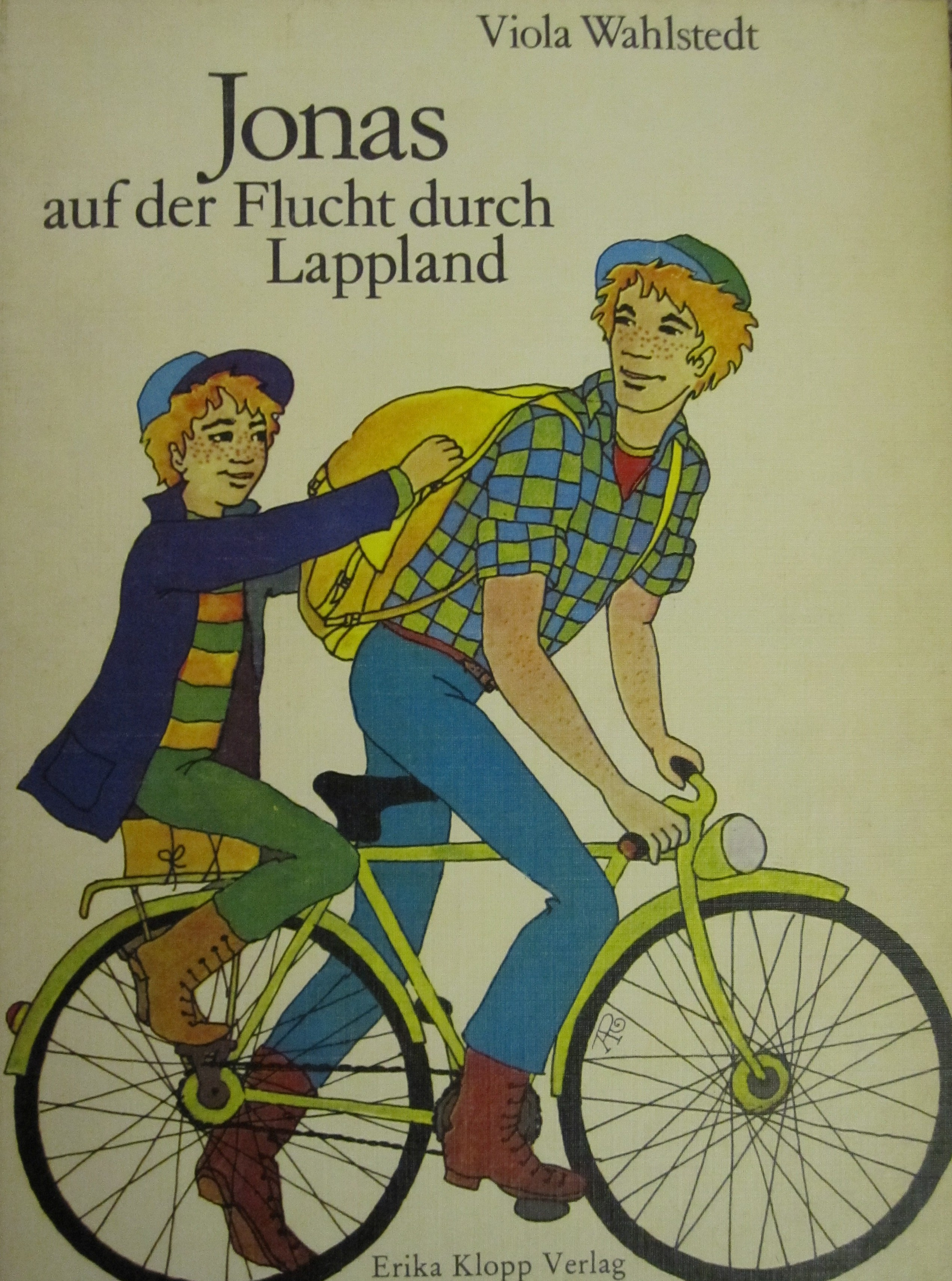
"Jonas auf der Flucht durch Lappland", book cover by Aiga Rasch, 1972

After successfully negotiating her school leaving exams she transferred to the University of Tübingen where her studies covered German studies, Philosophy and Psychology. She was keen to avoid competing professionally with her mother, and there was talk of a possible career as a journalist. During the summer vacation she volunteered for work with the works newspaper of the Ilseder Hütte (steelworks) where her talent as an illustrator was (re)discovered. In 1961 she abandoned her studies and embarked on the first of her two marriages.

In 1962 she attended a preparatory course intended to lead to her acceptance as a student at the State Academy of Fine Arts in Stuttgart, but she very soon abandoned the idea. A teacher criticised her work because it was too similar to that produced by her mother: he recommended that she would progress better as a "self-taught" artist and she now followed this advice, with positive results. She herself later observed that, at least when starting out, being the daughter of Lilo Rasch-Naegele was both a help and a hindrance.

=== Career ===
In 1963 Rasch launched herself as a freelance graphic artist. Although she had no trouble passing the exams needed to gain membership of the State Academy of Fine Arts in Stuttgart, she had received no formal artistic training, a more striking paradox in Germany than in those countries where non-vocational degrees are relatively "normal". Instead of artistic training, she had her family tradition. Her grandfather had specialised in producing paintings of flowers, and she had learned enough from her mother's professional career to be able to get a job. She joined the magazine "DM" and learned the business from the head of page layout. Between 1969 and 1980 she was a member of the West German Association of Professional Communication Designers ("Berufsverband der Deutschen Kommunikationsdesigner"/ BDG): during her last four years with the BDG she served as a member of its executive. On returning from a year abroad, in 1982 she became a member of the Württembergischer Kunstverein Stuttgart and in 1986 she returned to the BDG, that year being elected chair of its Baden-Württemberg regional group. On the national level, between 1988 and 1990 she was an honorary BDG vice-president.

Rasch spent 1980 in Colorado learning Zen meditation with Gia-Fu Feng, Tai chi and a little Kung fu, all of which greatly changed her life and her way of working: she switched to watercolor painting and reduced the extent of her focus on designing book-covers. After 1992 the computer became her principal work tool.

== The "three questions marks" logo ==
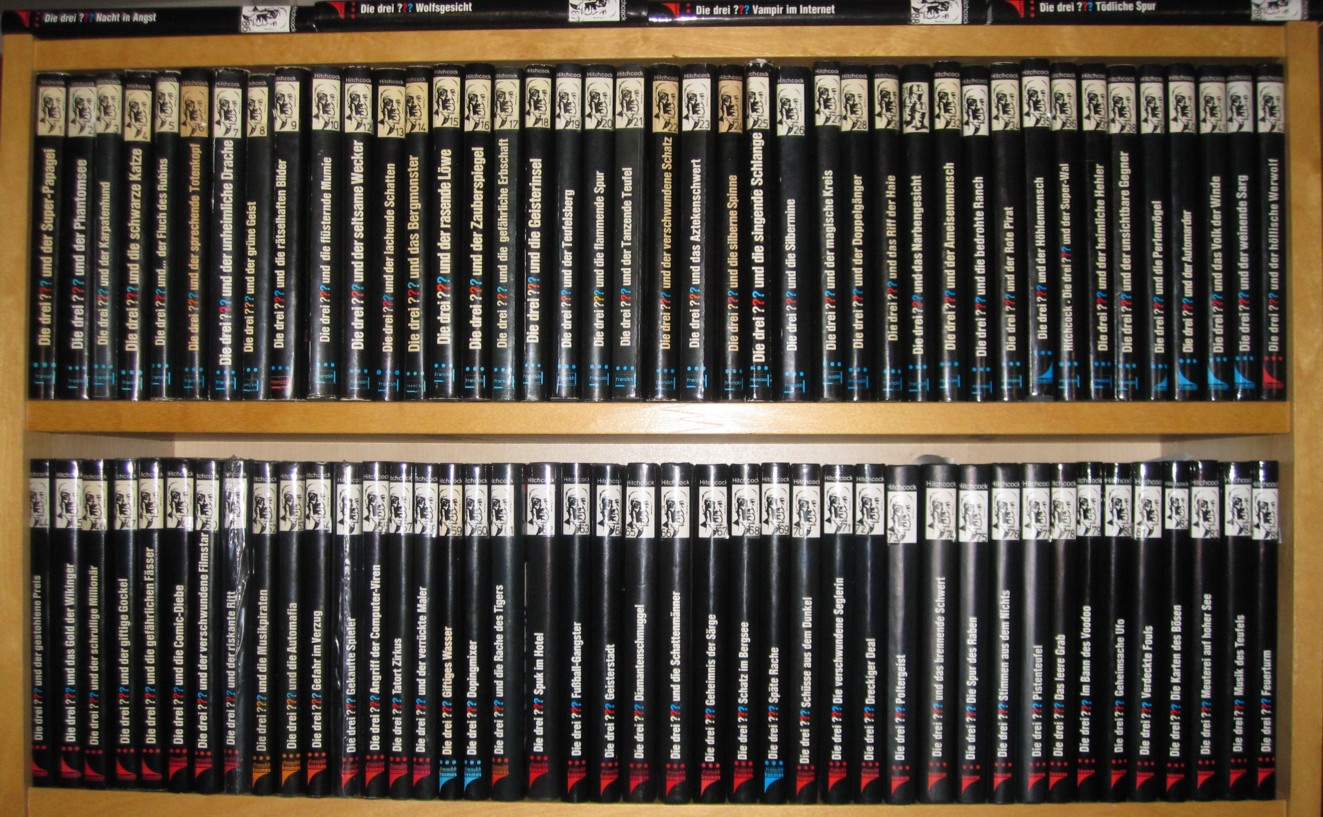
89 volumes in the "Three question marks" series, all with covers designed by Aiga Rasch between 1970 and 1999

Aiga Rasch became well known, above all, because of the title pages of the children's book series "Die drei ???" ("The three question marks": known for English-language readers as the "Three Investigators" series ). The first volumes were translated into German from American-English, and later achieved the cult status which in Germany they retain today partly because of the cover-pages. The designs are distinctive and unmistakable.

Rasch had worked for Kosmos Verlag as a freelance contributor since 1962, providing illustrations for children's and young people's books. In 1969 she came across the first two volumes in the new series, "Das Gespensterschloss" ("The Secret of Terror Castle") and "Die flüsternde Mumie" ("The whispering Mummy") – based on Alfred Hitchcock films – with dust jackets by Jochen Bartsch, and she questioned their impact. She did not think they stood out particularly. She submitted alternative cover designs of her own, but these were met with initial suspicion. She then suggested to the publishers that if they used her proposal, and it failed to gain traction in the shops, she would forego her fee for the design. The initial response remained negative, but eventually they were persuaded to let her provide a design for the cover page of the third volume in the series.

In 1970 she presented her cover page proposal for the third volume, "Fluch des Rubins", as a collage using just red, white and black. She later switched to a full-colour design, eventually switching to using the then new felt pens. The protagonists in the stories never featured in the title images, which was explained as an artistic device that would permit readers to develop their own mental images.

Although the American series on which the German one was originally based originally ran to only 43 books, in Germany the "Die drei ???" series achieved a momentum which enabled Kosmos to produce 89 of the between 1970 and 1999, and they all came with covers designed by Aiga Rasch. Her contribution included 16 redesigned cover for new editions of previously published books. After she retired, Rasch worked again for Kosmos from 2006, producing more book cover designs, some now reworked digitally.

Rasch's cover designs were not restricted to books. After 1979 her "Three question marks" cover designs were also used for "Talking Books" issued under the Europa label. Including re-issues and talking books, publications featuring Aiga Rasch's cover designs have appeared on more than 30 million published copies in Germany alone. Her "Three question marks" cover-logo was also incorporated in designs used in China, Greece and Russia.
