= The Clock Towers =

Building complex in Makkah, Saudi Arabia Mecca region

Coordinates: 21°25′08″N 39°49′35″E

- أبراج الساعة

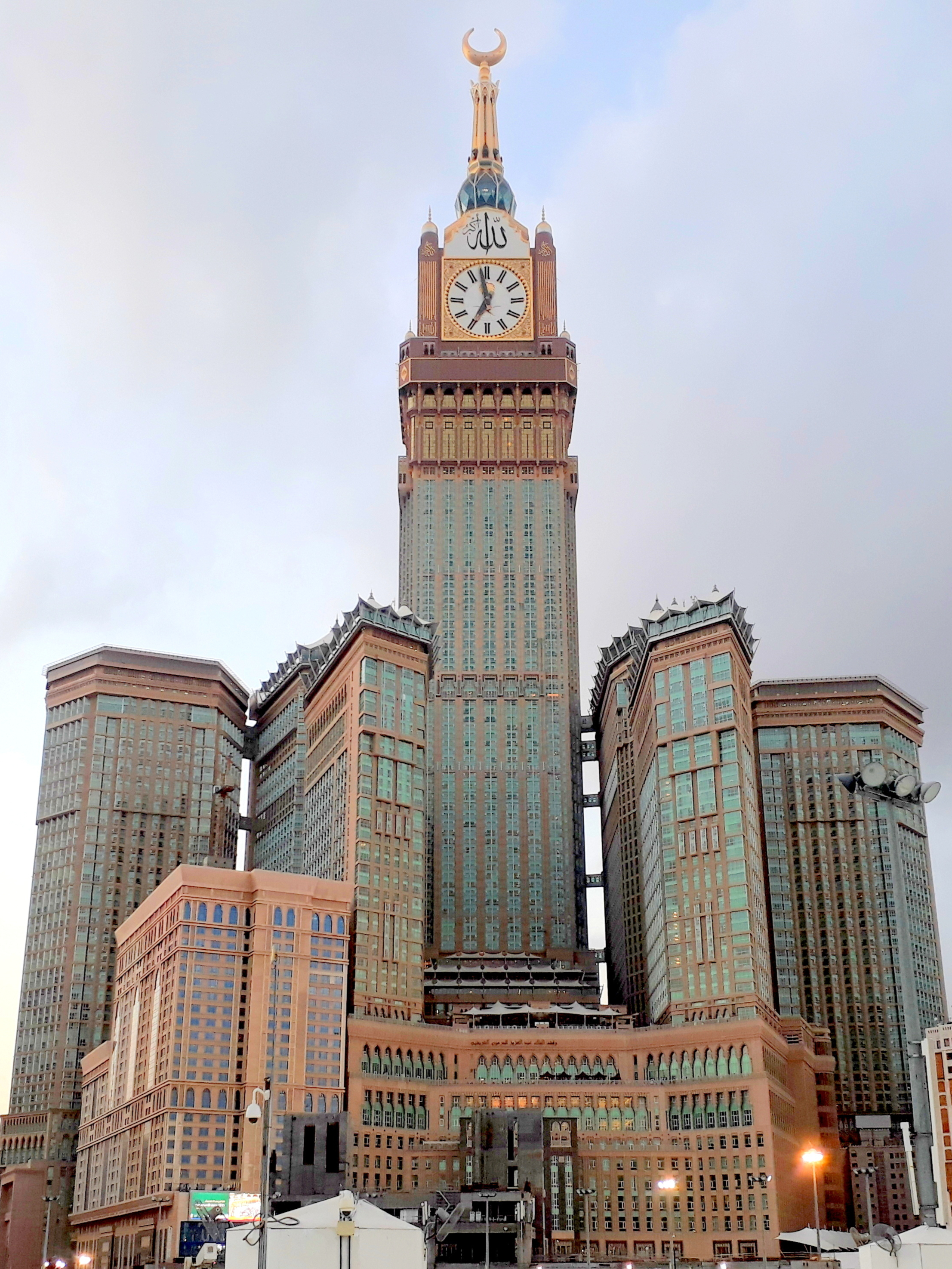
- The Clock Towers in 2026

Record height
- Tallest in Saudi Arabia since 2012^{[I]}
- Preceded by: Kingdom Centre

General information
- Type: Mixed use: Hotel, Residential
- Architectural style: Postmodern; New Classical
- Location: Mecca, Saudi Arabia
- Construction started: 2002; 24 years ago
- Completed: 2011; 15 years ago
- Opening: 2012; 14 years ago
- Cost: US$15 billion

Height
- Architectural: 601 m (1,972 ft)
- Tip: 601 m (1,972 ft)
- Antenna spire: 93 metres (305 feet)
- Roof: 508 m (1,667 ft)
- Top floor: 494 m (1,621 ft)
- Observatory: 484.4 m (1,589 ft)

Technical details
- Material: Main structural system: reinforced concrete (lower part), steel/concrete composite construction, steel construction (upper part); cladding: glass, marble, natural stone, carbon-/glass-fibre-reinforced plastic
- Floor count: 120 (Mecca Royal Clock Tower)
- Floor area: Tower: 310,638 m^{2} (3,343,680 sq ft); Development: 1,575,815 m^{2} (16,961,930 sq ft) (389.4 acres)
- Lifts/elevators: 96 (Mecca Royal Clock Tower with mall included)

Design and construction
- Architects: SL Rasch GmbH and Dar Al-Handasah Architects
- Structural engineer: SL Rasch GmbH and Dar Al-Handasah
- Main contractor: Saudi Binladin Group

Website
- theclocktowers.com

The Clock Towers (Arabic: أبراج الساعة, romanized: ʾAbrāj as-Sāʿaẗ, lit. 'Towers of the Clock'), formerly known as Abraj al-Bait (Arabic: أبراج البيت, romanized: ʾAbrāj al-Bayt, lit. 'Towers of the House'), is a government-owned hotel complex with seven skyscraper hotels in Mecca, Saudi Arabia. These towers are part of the King Abdulaziz Endowment Project that aims to modernize the city in catering to its pilgrims. The central hotel tower, which is the Mecca Royal Clock Tower (Arabic: برج ساعة مكة الملكي, romanized: Burj Sāʿat Makkaẗ al-Malikī), is the fourth-tallest building and sixth-tallest freestanding structure in the world. According to Guinness World Records, the Mecca Royal Clock Tower is the tallest clock tower in the world, and the complex of seven buildings comprise the world's second most expensive building. The clock faces are the largest in the world, and the top four floors of the clock tower house the Clock Tower Museum.

The building complex is 300 metres (980 ft) away from the world's largest mosque and Islam's most sacred site, the Great Mosque of Mecca. The developer and contractor of the complex is the Saudi Binladin Group, the Kingdom's largest construction company. The total cost of construction totaled US$15 billion. The complex was built after the demolition of the Ajyad Fortress, the 18th-century Ottoman citadel on top of a hill overlooking the Grand Mosque.

== Description ==
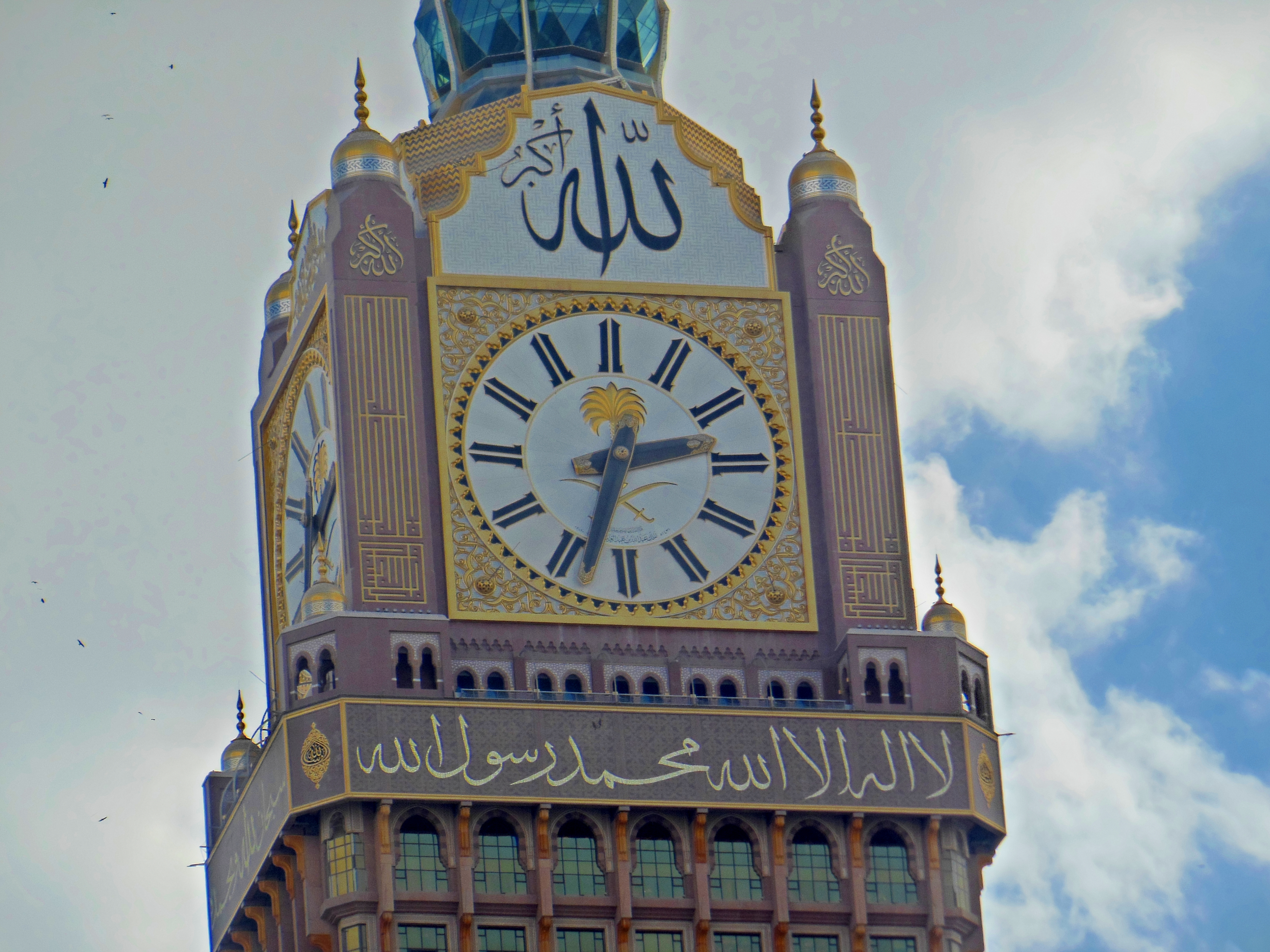
The Mecca Royal Clock Tower's clocks, the largest in the world

The tallest tower in the complex is the tallest building in Saudi Arabia, at 601 m (1,972 ft) and a total surface area of 32,000 square meters. It is the sixth-tallest freestanding structure in the world, surpassing the Ping An Finance Centre in Shenzhen, China but shorter than the Burj Khalifa in Dubai, UAE; the Tokyo Skytree in Tokyo, Japan; the Shanghai Tower in Shanghai, China; and the Canton Tower in Guangzhou, China.

The site of the complex is across the piazza to the south from the main entrance (King Abdul-Aziz Gate) to the Masjid al Haram mosque, which houses the Kaaba. It accommodates worshippers visiting the Kaaba. The tallest tower in the complex also contains a five-star hotel, operated by Fairmont Hotels and Resorts, to help provide lodging for the millions of pilgrims that travel to Mecca annually to participate in the Hajj.

In addition, The Clock Towers has a five-story shopping mall (The Clock Towers Shopping Center) and a parking garage capable of holding over a thousand vehicles.

The building was planned to be 734 m (2,408 ft) tall in 2006. In 2009, it was published that the final height would be 601 m (1,972 ft). The complex was built by the Saudi Binladin Group, Saudi Arabia's largest construction company. The façade was constructed by Premiere Composite Technologies, and the clock by German tower clock manufacturer PERROT GmbH & Co. KG Turmuhren und Läuteanlagen. Because of its location in Mecca, non-Muslim members of the construction team were not allowed to visit the site, and some specialists from Poland and Germany converted to Islam to be able to do so. According to the Saudi Ministry of Religious Endowments, the overall project cost US$15 billion.

=== Clock ===
There are clock faces on all four sides of the main hotel tower. The total height of the clock is 57 m (187 ft), situated above the media displays under the clock faces. At 43 m × 43 m (141 ft × 141 ft), these are the largest in the world. The roof of the clock is 450 m (1,480 ft) above the ground, making it the world's most elevated architectural clock. A spire has been added on top of the clock giving it a total height of 601 m (1,972 ft). Behind the clock faces, there is an astronomy exhibition. In the spire base and the iron-covered floors (The Jewel) there is a scientific center that is used to sight the moon at the beginning of the Islamic months, and to operate an atomic clock that controls the tower clock faces.

=== List of Towers in Mecca Clock Tower Complex ===
| Tower | Name meaning | Height | Floors | Completion | Tenants |
|---|---|---|---|---|---|
| Mecca Royal Clock Tower | —N/a | 607 m (1,991 ft) | 120 | 2012 | Fairmont Makkah Clock Royal Tower Hotel |
| Hajar Tower | Hagar, mother of Ishmael | 279 m (915 ft) | 58 | 2012 | Mövenpick Hotel & Residences Hajar Tower Makkah |
| Zamzam Tower | Zamzam Well, a holy well in Mecca | 279 m (915 ft) | 58 | 2012 | Pullman ZamZam Makkah Hotel |
| Al Maqam Tower | Station of Ibrahim, a rock claimed to contain the footprints of Abraham (Ibrahim) | 232 m (761 ft) | 61 | 2012 | Swissôtel al Maqam Makkah |
| Qibla Tower | Qibla, direction of prayer, towards the Kaaba | 232 m (761 ft) | 61 | 2012 | Swissôtel Makkah |
| Al Safa Tower | Safa and Marwa, hills in Mecca | 220 m (720 ft) | 46 | 2007 | Raffles Makkah Palace Hotel |
| Marwah Tower | Safa and Marwa, hills in Mecca | 220 m (720 ft) | 46 | 2008 | Al Marwa Rayhaan by Rotana - Makkah Hotel |
| The Clock Tower Mall | near the Kaaba entrance | 220 m (720 ft) | 7 | 2012 | Shopping Mall with more than 600 stores |

== Features ==
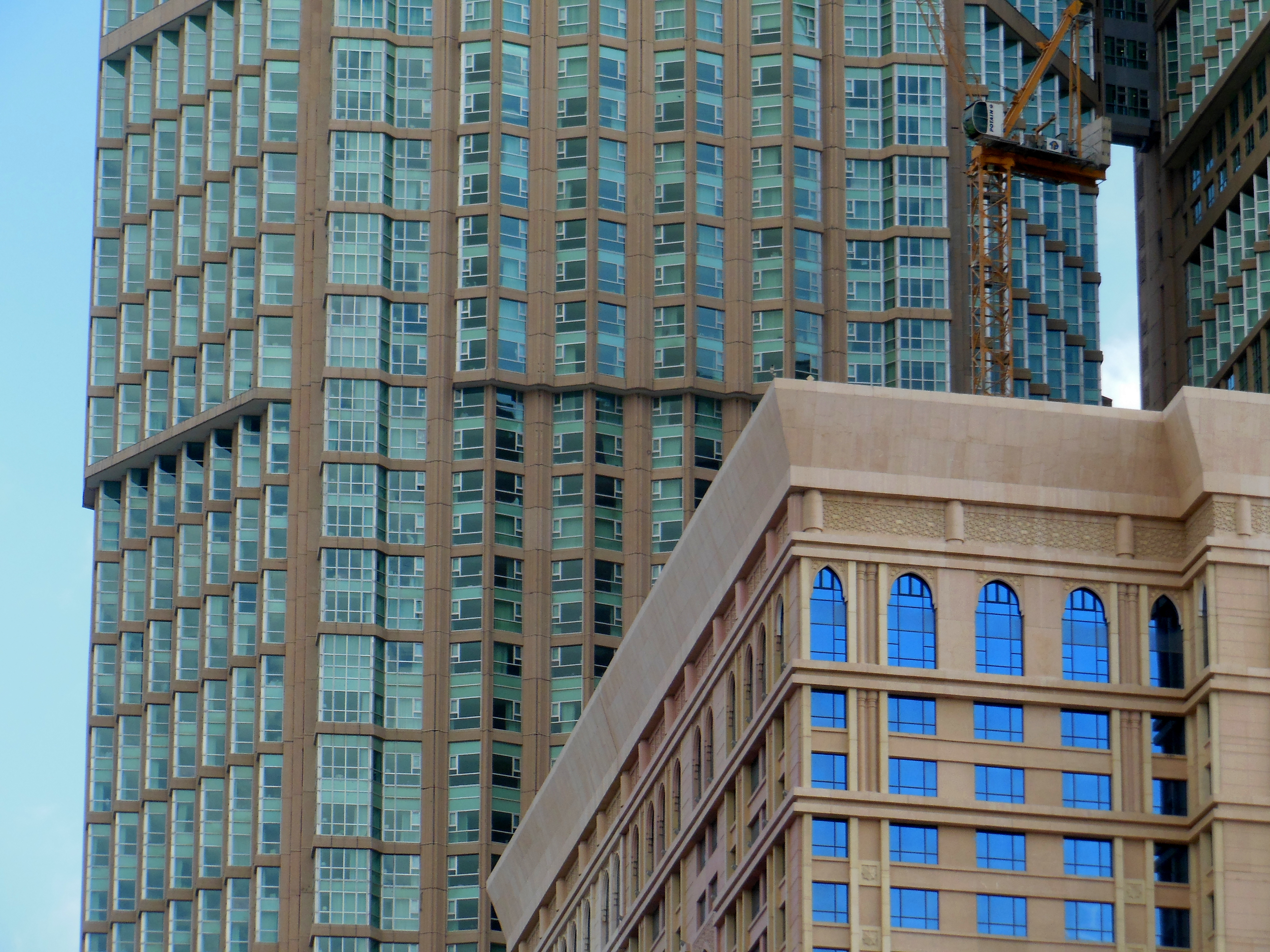
The Clock Towers' architecture has fine detail

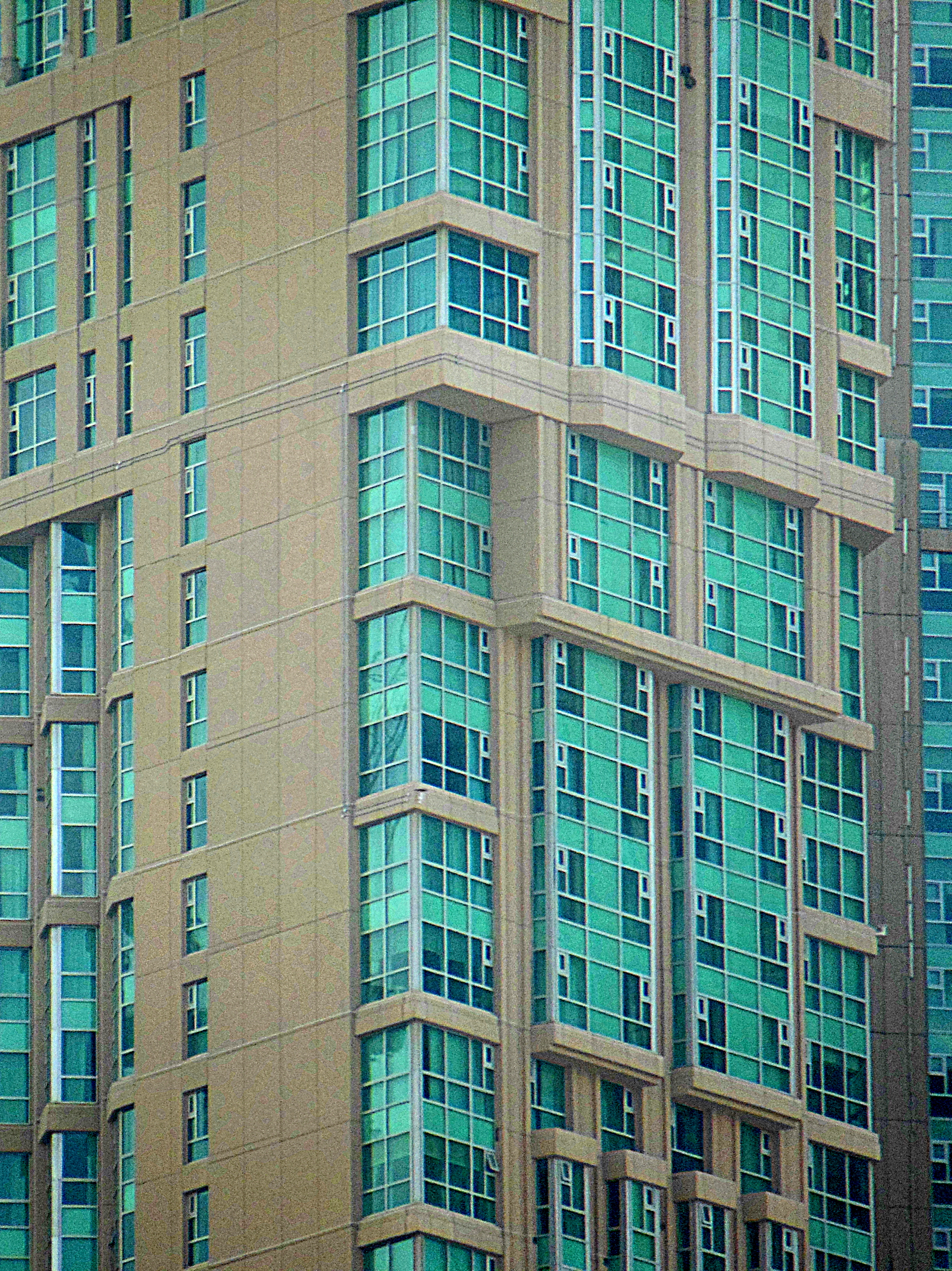
The Clock Towers' cladding

The building is topped by a four-faced clock, visible from 25 kilometres (16 miles) away. The clock is the highest in the world at over 400 m (1,300 ft) above the ground, surpassing the Allen-Bradley clock tower in Milwaukee. The clock faces are the largest in the world, surpassing the Cevahir Mall clock in Istanbul.

Each of the clock's four faces measures 43 m (141 ft) in diameter and are illuminated by 2 million LED lights, with four oriented edges, just above the clock alongside huge Arabic script reading: "God is [the] greatest" on the north and south faces and on the west and east "There is no god but Allah. Muhammad is the messenger of God." Four golden domes on pillars on all the corners are also present. The same as the Saudi flag, fitted at the top of the clock, flash to signal Islam's five-time daily prayers. On special occasions such as new year, 21,000 green and white xenon bulbs and LED lamps during the call to the five prayers times of the day. On special occasions, 40 beacon lights create lighting effects. In addition, strong lasers throw their rays 30 kilometers into the sky. The clock's four faces are covered with 98 million pieces of glass mosaics. The Saudi coat of arms is displayed at the center of each clock behind the dials. The minute hand is 23 m (75 ft) long, while the hour hand is 18 m (59 ft) long.

There were reports that the clock would be set to Mecca Time, in an attempt to replace the IERS Reference Meridian as the prime meridian for global time keeping, but the clock is set to Arabia Standard Time (UTC+03:00).

=== Spire ===
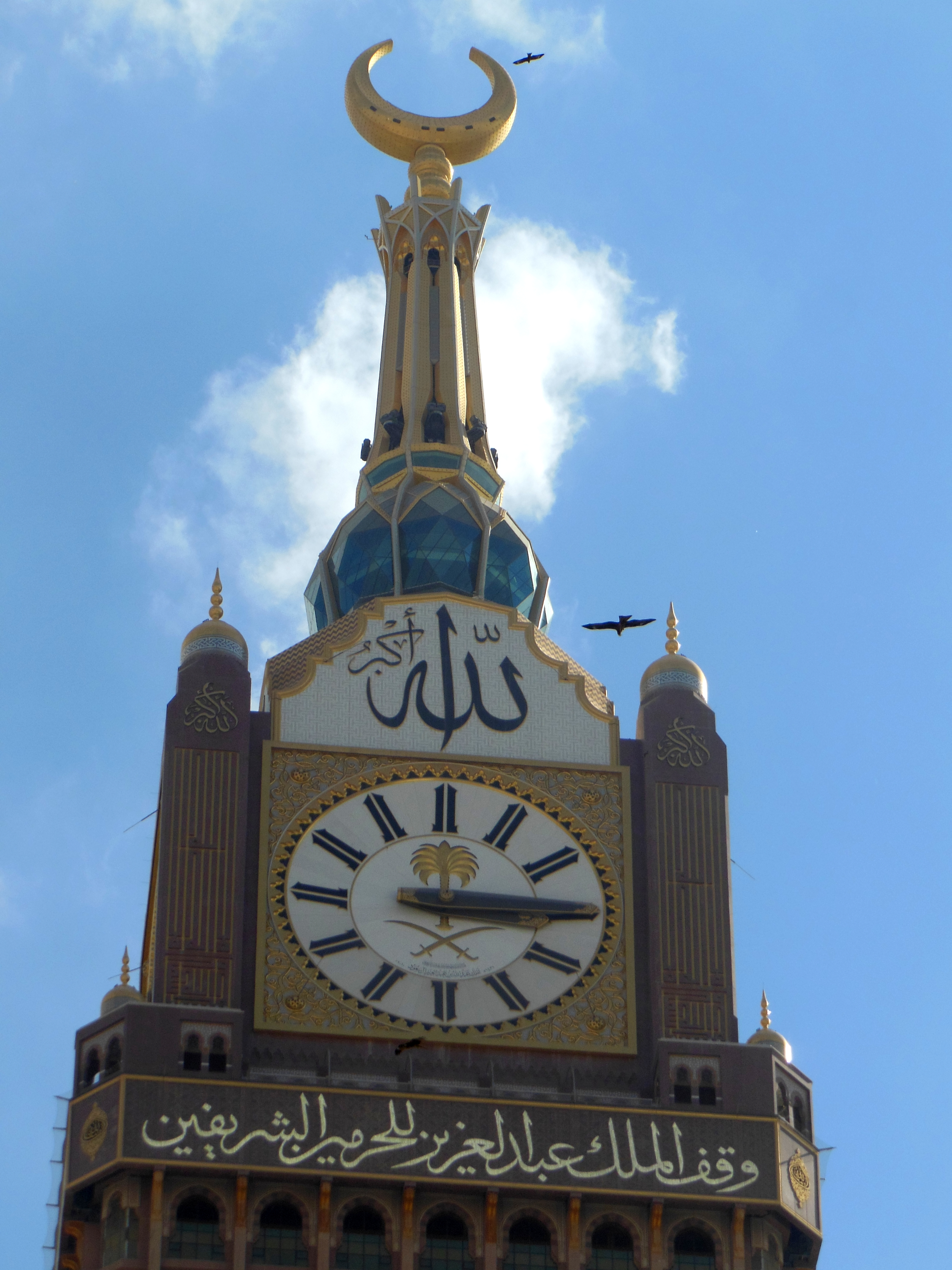
The Clock Towers' clock and spire

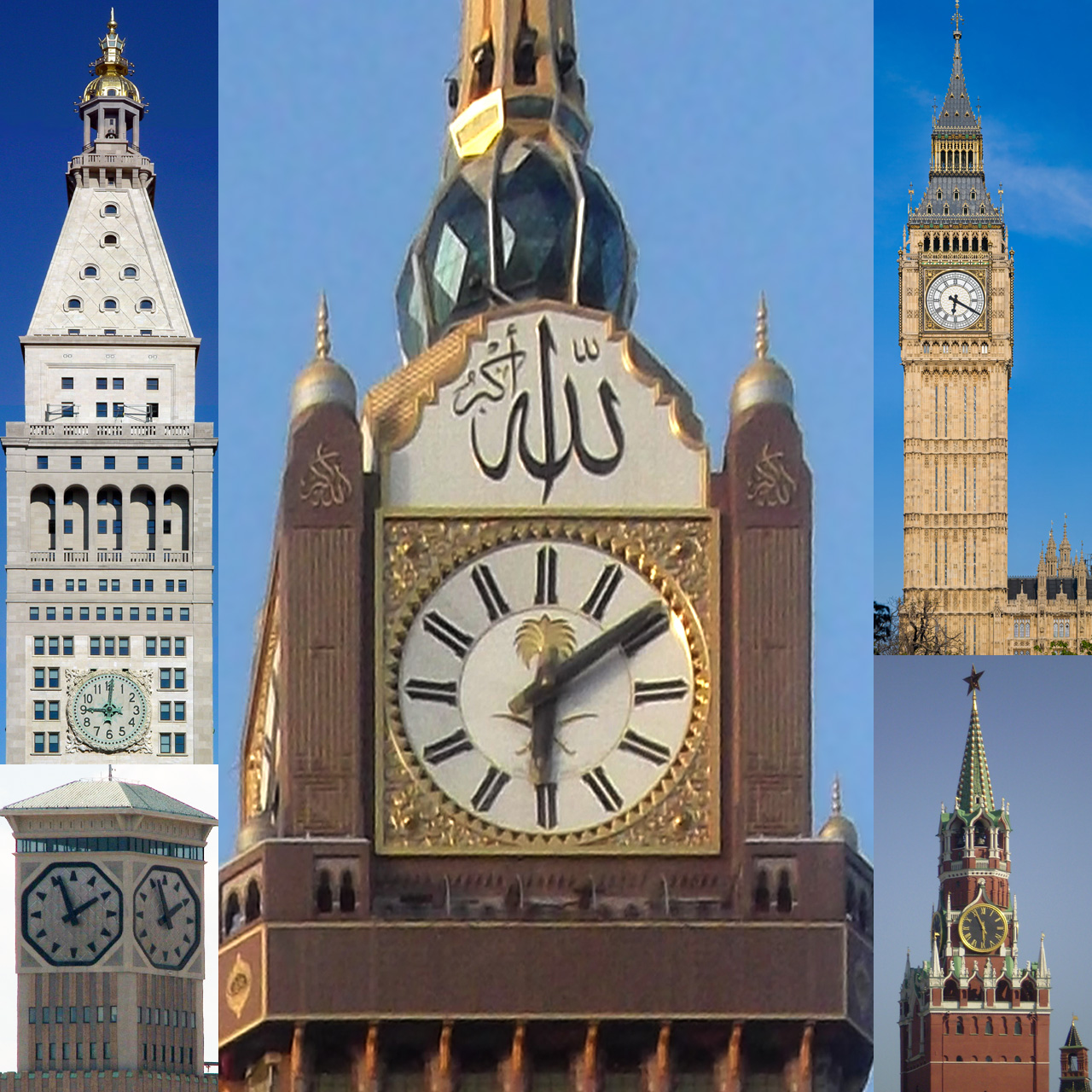
Comparison of some notable four-face clocks at the same scale.: Top-left: / Metropolitan Life Insurance Company Tower; Bottom-left: / Allen-Bradley Clock Tower (previous largest); Middle: / Abraj Al Bait; Top-right: / Elizabeth Tower ("Big Ben"); Bottom-right: / Kremlin Clock

The spire has an eight-story glass-covered base (The Jewel) which belongs to a scientific center having its own small exhibition, another observation deck at 484 m (1,588 ft). The highest floor in The Jewel is the Control Tower Floor, which was planned to be used for controlling air traffic in the sky above Mecca (mainly helicopters, as airplanes are not allowed near Mecca). However, this was skipped for technical reasons and the future usage is not clear yet. Above from The Jewel, the spire has only technical installations for sound, light, and other infrastructure and eventually the last viewing deck and the crescent above it. The crescent is 21 m (69 ft) in diameter, has two regular floors with living areas, a prayer room in the center of the crescent and a few service floors and rooms.

The crescent was constructed in Dubai in April 2011. It is made of fiberglass-backed mosaic gold, and it weighs up to 35 tonnes. It cost 90 million United Arab Emirates dirhams and took three months to build.

The minaret and its base have loudspeakers which broadcast prayer calls to a distance of 7 km (4.3 mi) away and across an area of approximately 160 km^{2} (62 sq mi).

== Incidents ==
=== Construction fires ===
The Clock Towers complex had two fire incidents during construction. The first fire accident was at Hajar Tower on 28 October 2008. It took 400 firefighters to put out the fire, which burned for 10 hours, consuming nine floors of the tower. According to eyewitness reports, the blaze erupted shortly after midnight, and spread rapidly because of wood used for construction stored in the premises. Soon, the entire building was engulfed in smoke. Hospitals were put on high alert, but no injuries were reported. A civil defence spokesman claimed the fire started on the 32nd floor of the Hajar Tower.

The second fire struck the Safa Tower on 1 May 2009. No deaths or injuries were reported in the blaze which was quickly contained by Civil Defence. Eyewitnesses said the fire broke out soon after Asr prayer while some workers in the building were welding iron rods on wooden scaffoldings. The fire damaged a large part of the under-construction tower. According to Major General Adel Zamzami, director general of Civil Defence in the Mecca province, the fire broke out at the 14th floor and reached up to the 20th floor.

=== Controversy ===
The destruction of the historically significant site in 2002 by the Saudi government sparked an outcry and a strong reaction from Turkey. The location chosen for the towers was the historic 18th-century Ottoman-era Ajyad Fortress. The fortress was demolished to make way for the complex. The development has been criticized by The Guardian for having "transformed a type of architecture that evolved from a dense urban grain of low-rise courtyards and narrow streets into ... an endlessly repeatable pattern for the decoration of standardized [concrete] slab(s)".

== Gallery ==
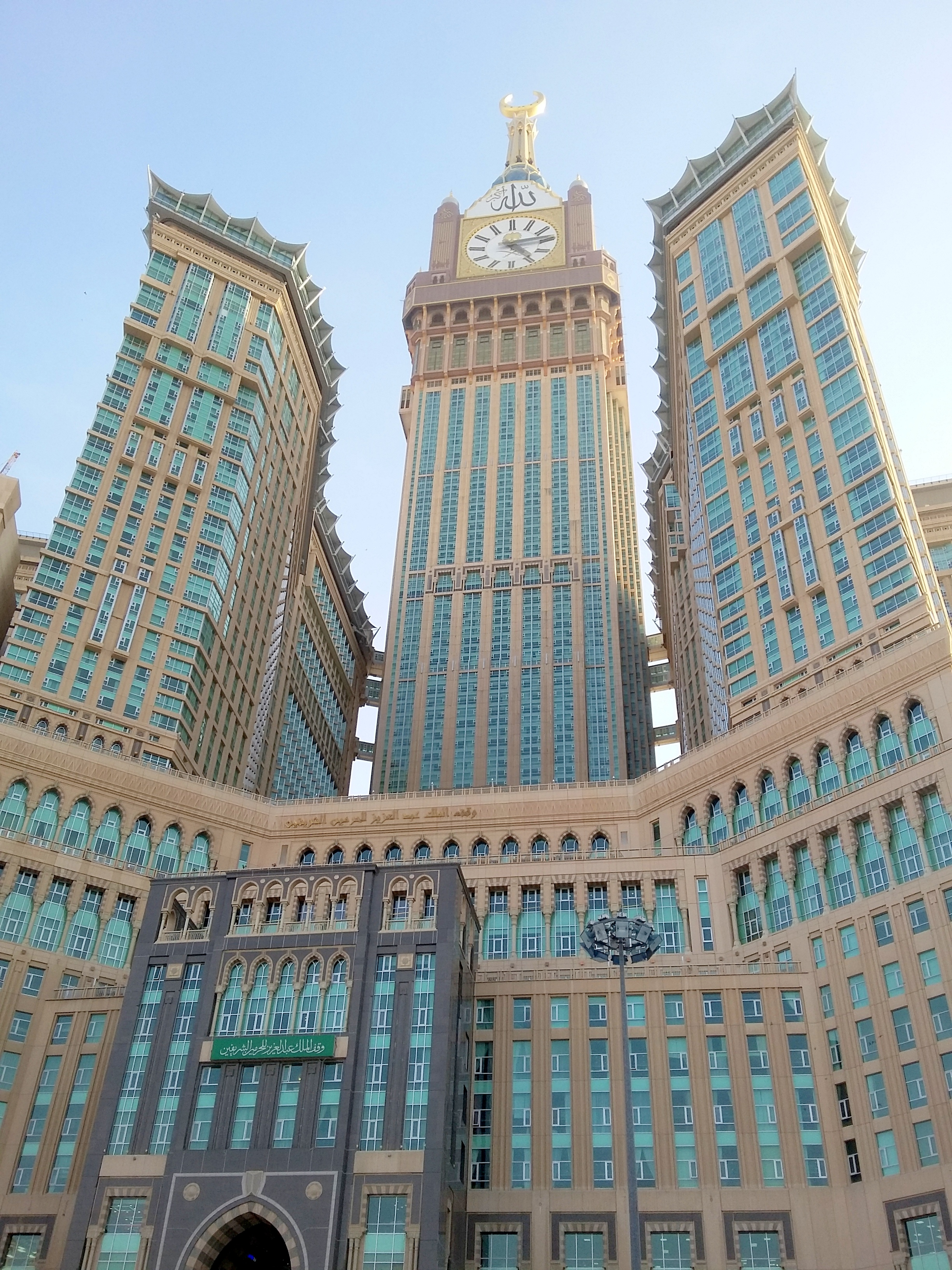
Abraj al Bait Tower from Haram Piaza

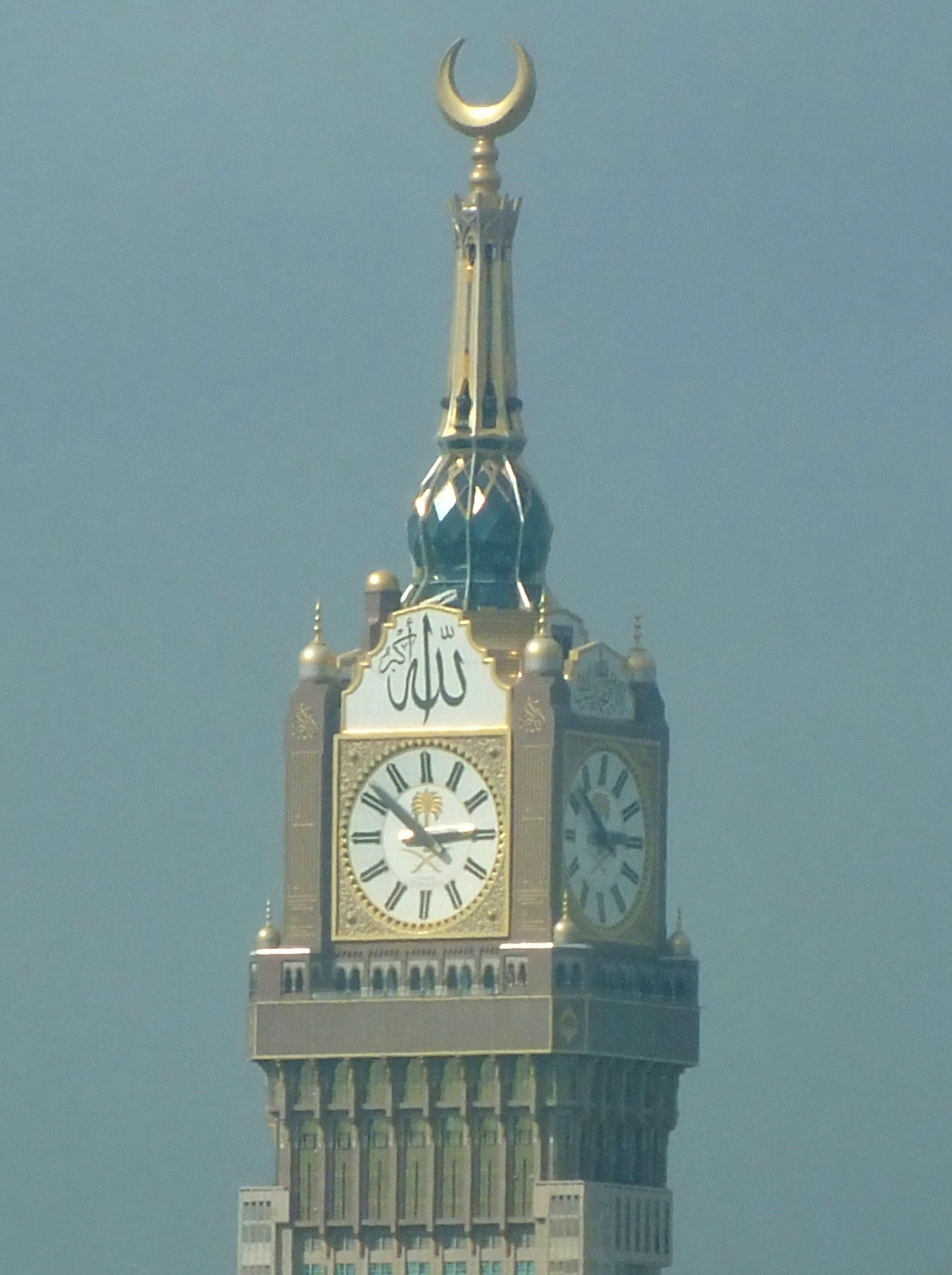
Clock Face on a sunny day

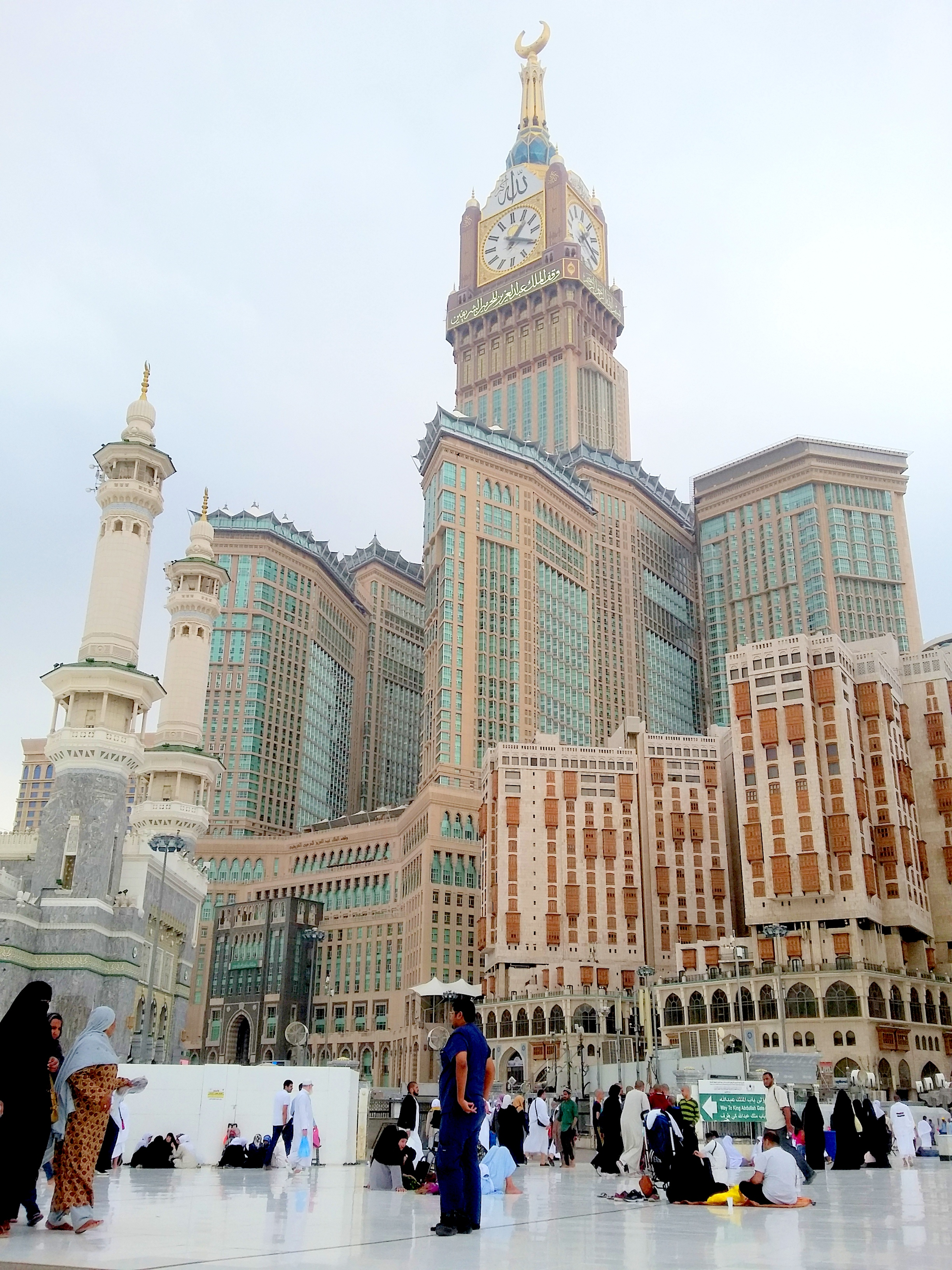
Abraj al Bait Tower from Haram Courtyard

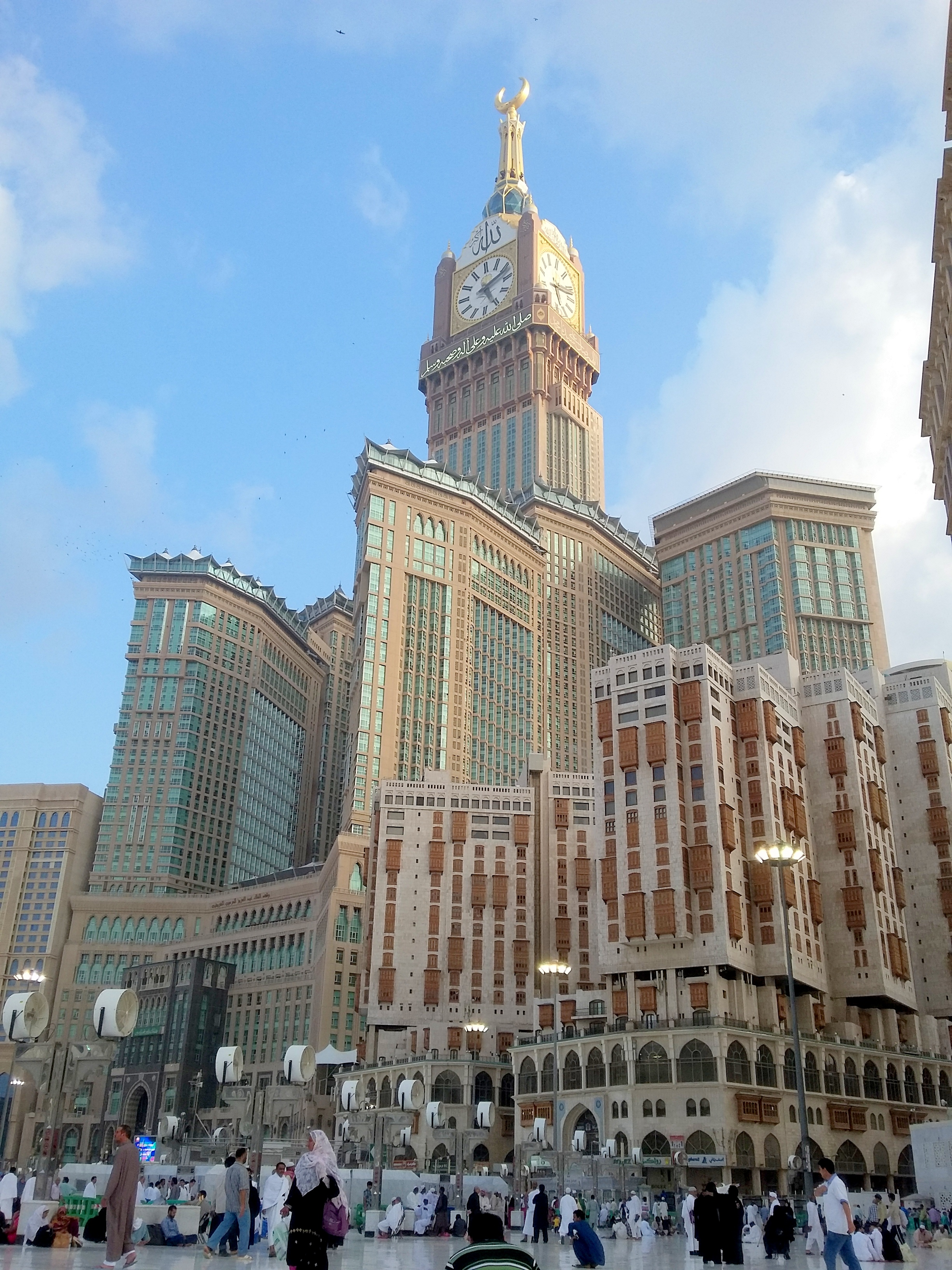
Clock Tower in early morning

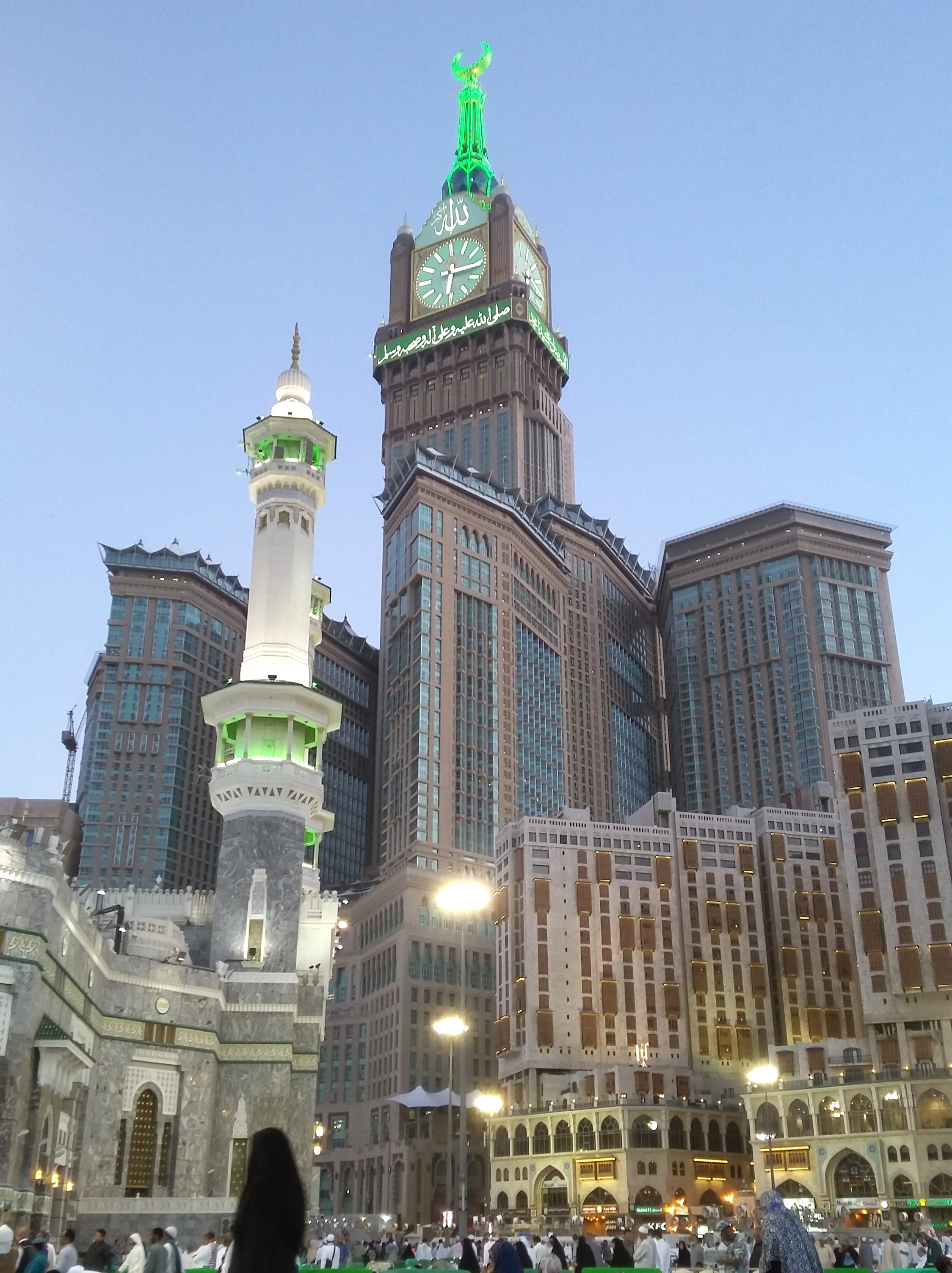
Clock Tower in the evening

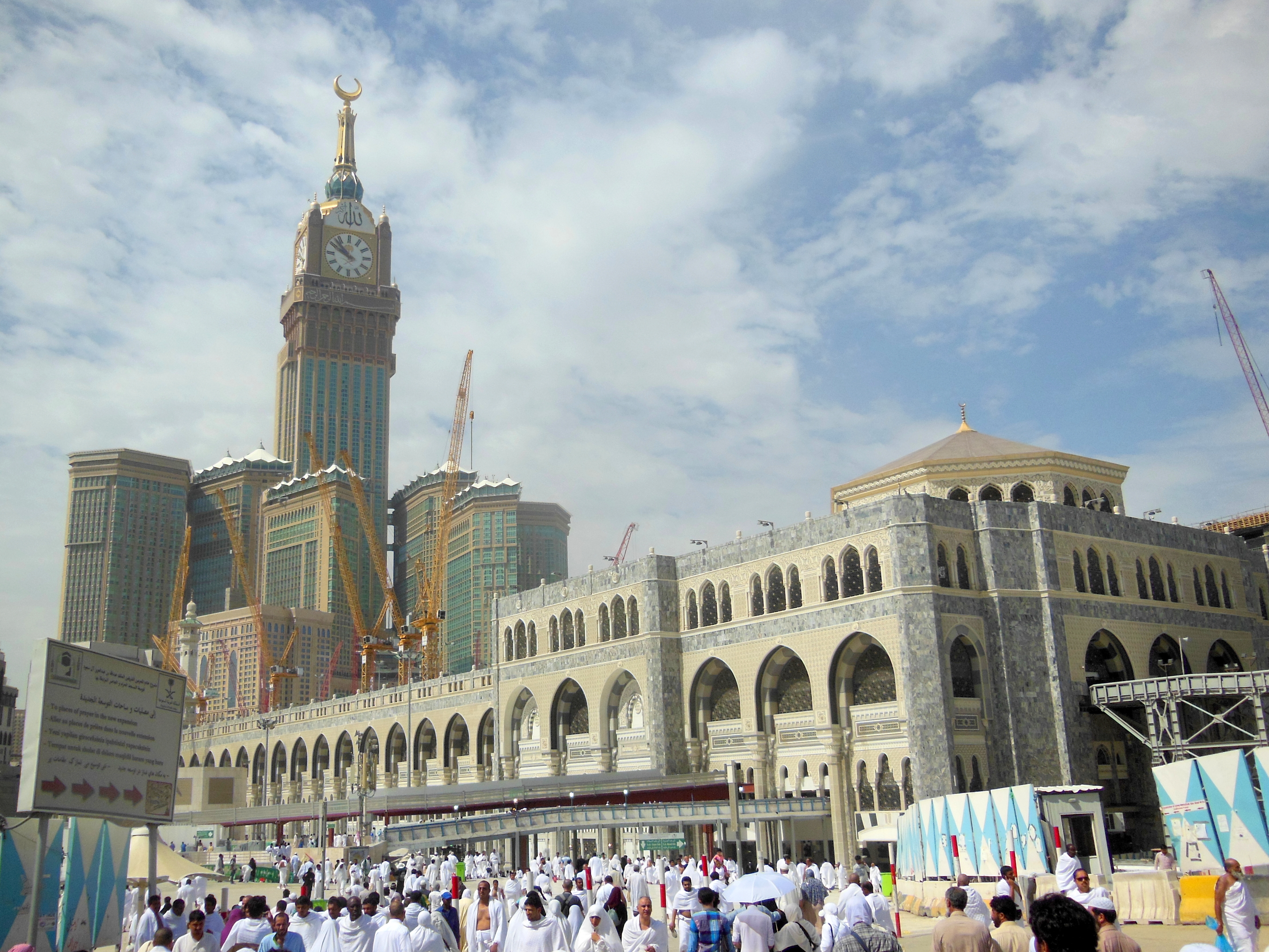
Clock Tower as seen from Mount Marwa

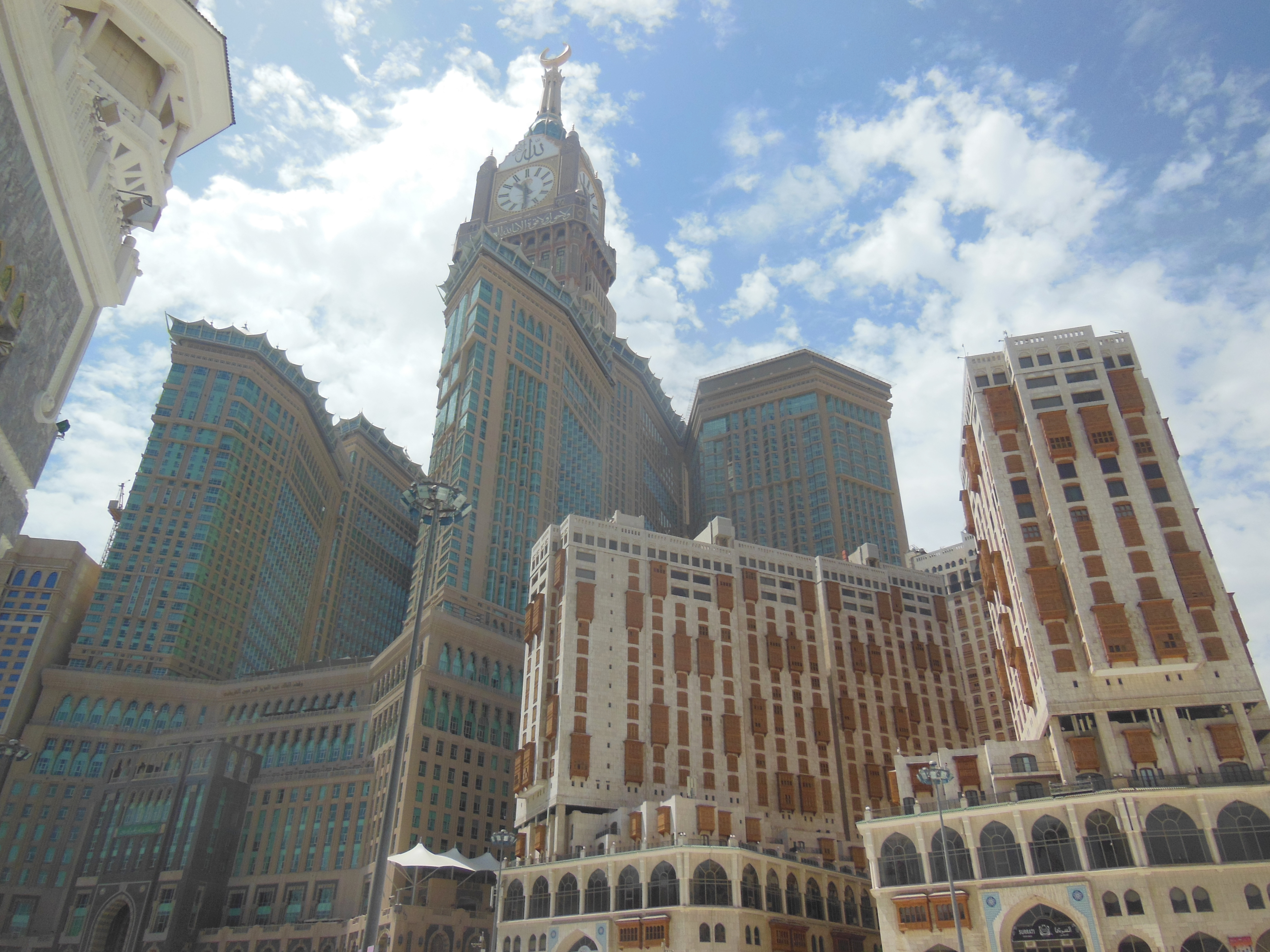
Abraj al Bait from another angle

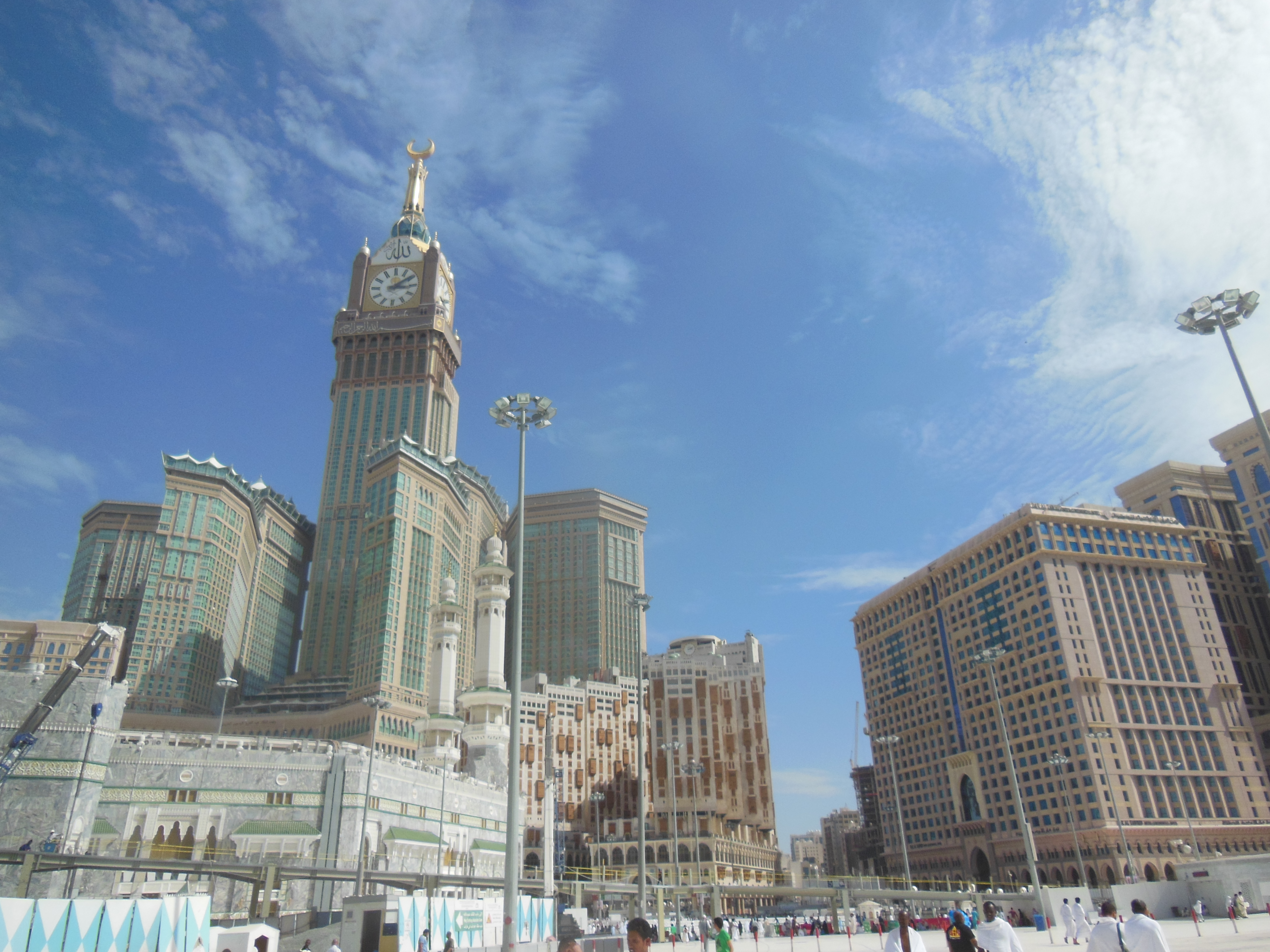
Clock Tower as seen from Haram King Abdullah Expansion

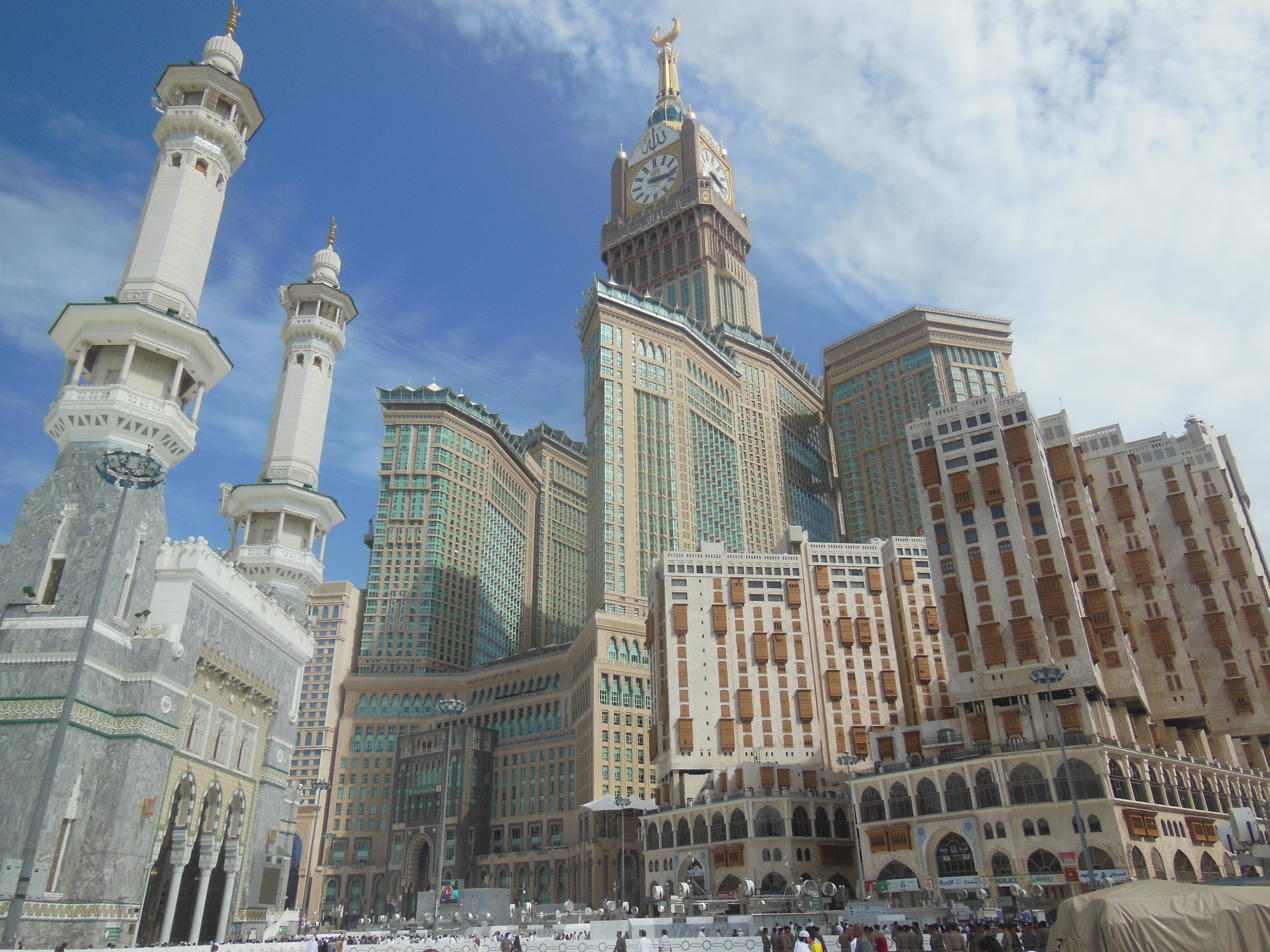
Clock Tower looking tall.

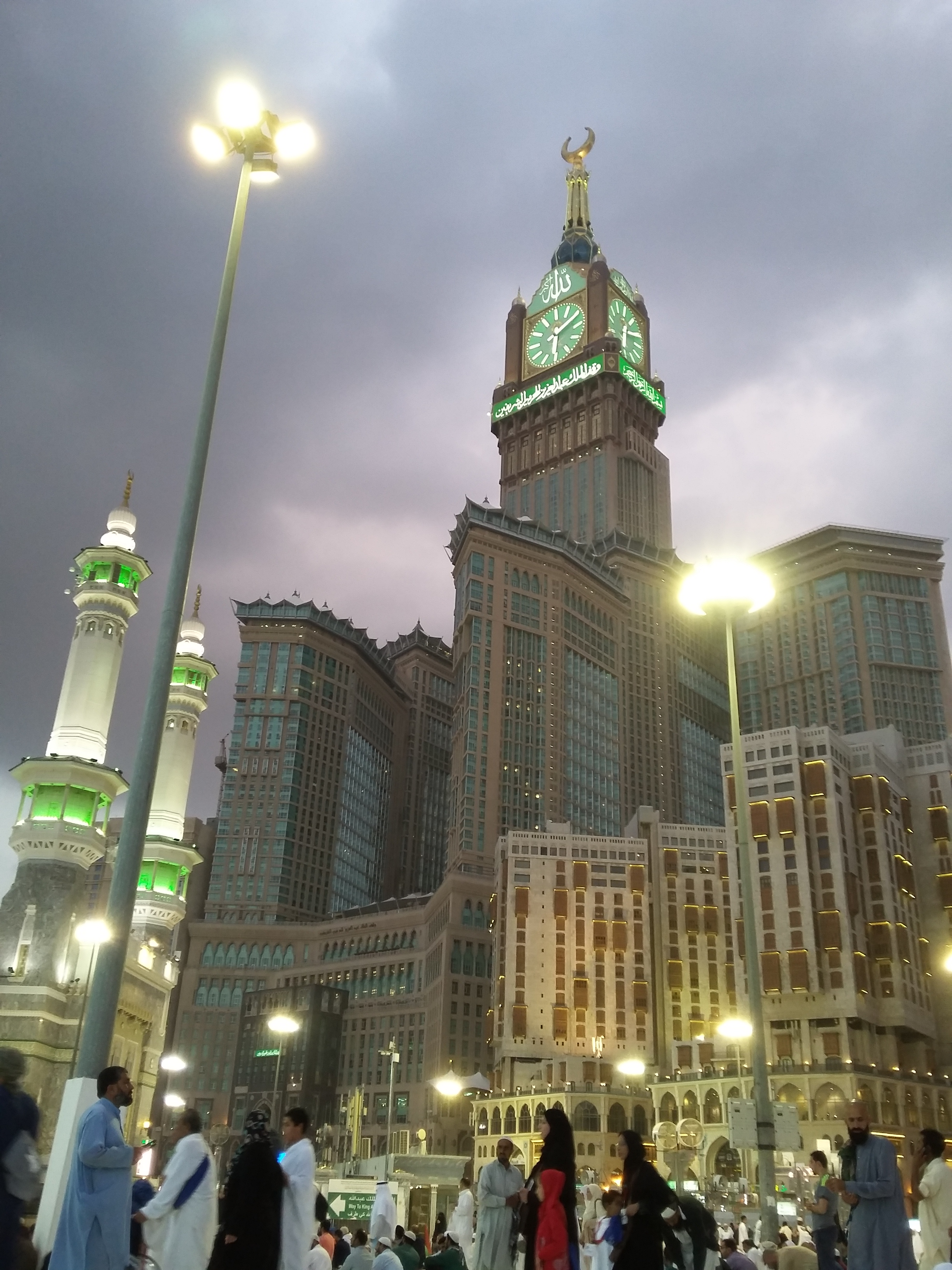
Clock Tower at dawn

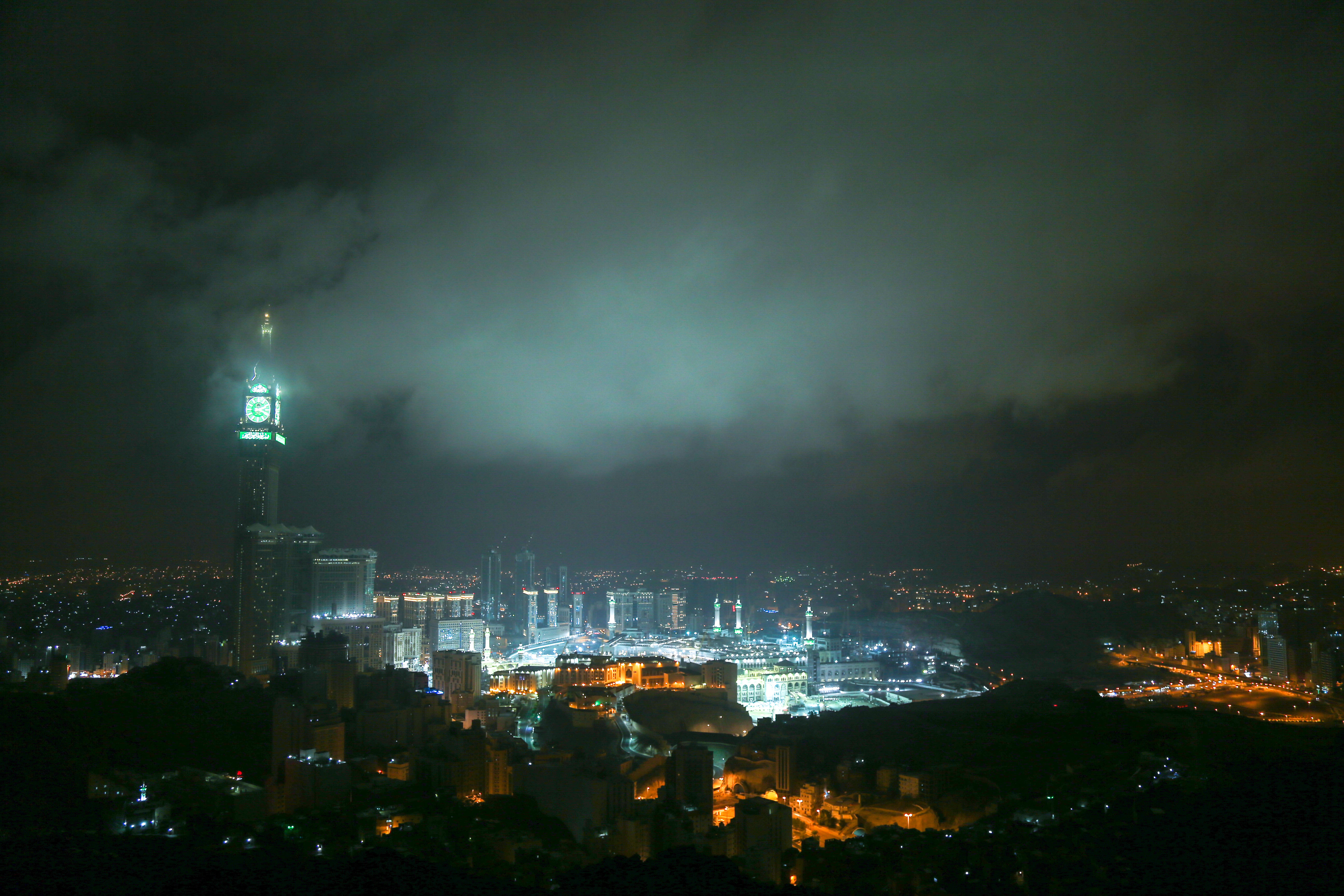
Clock Tower at night

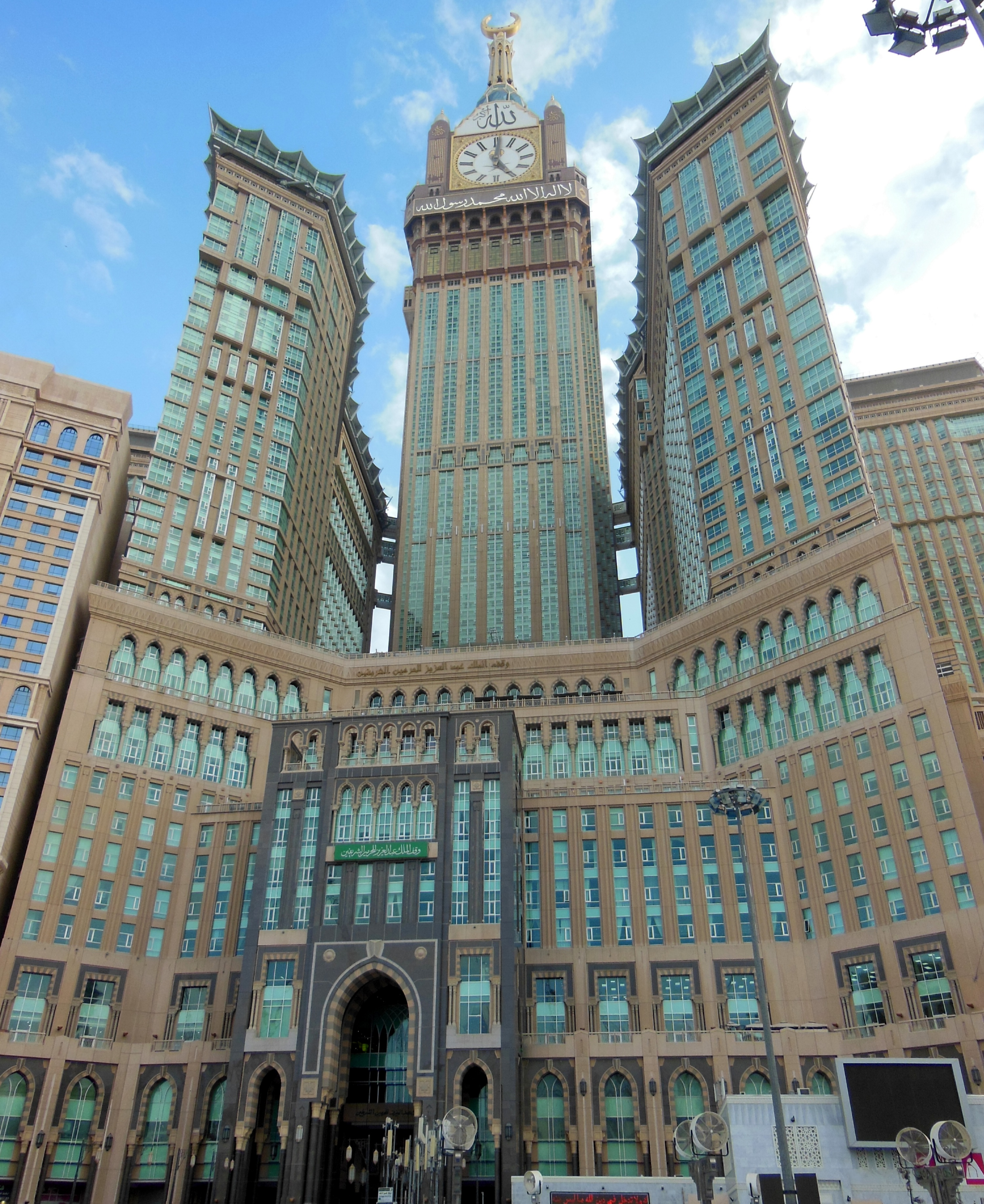
Ground level view of Clock Tower

== See also ==
- List of buildings with 100 floors or more
- List of tallest buildings in Saudi Arabia
- List of tallest buildings
- List of largest buildings
- List of largest hotels
- List of tallest hotels
- List of largest clock faces

Records
| Preceded by Kingdom Centre | Tallest building in Saudi Arabia (Makkah Clock Tower); 2012–present 601 metres (1,972 ft) | Incumbent |
