= Schiesser =

German underwear and lingerie brand

Schiesser AG
- Type: Aktiengesellschaft
- Industry: Clothing
- Founded: 1875
- Founder: Jacques Schiesser
- Headquarters: Radolfzell, Baden-Württemberg, Germany
- Key people: Rudolf Bündgen, CEO
- Products: Lingerie; Undergarment
- Revenue: €132 million (2010)
- Number of employees: 1,770 (2010)
- Parent: Delta Galil Industries Ltd.
- Website: schiesser.com

Schiesser AG is a German underwear and lingerie brand which is headquartered in Radolfzell, Germany. It was founded in 1875 by Jacques Schiesser.

== History ==
It was founded in 1875 and by 1880 had grown to 280 employees. When the founder Jacques Schiesser died from heart failure in 1913, the company already employed 1200 people, and it has since worked itself into a global brand. Since 2011, Schiesser has been owned by the Israeli corporation Delta Galil.
